= List of children's animated television series of the 1960s =

This is a list of children's animated television series; that is, animated programs originally targeted towards audiences aged 12 and under in mind.

This list does not include Japanese, Chinese, or Korean series, as children's animation is much more common in these regions.

== 1960s ==
=== United States ===
Title	Genre	Seasons/episodes	Show creator(s)	Original release	Network	Studio	Age rating	Technique
The Flintstones	Sitcom	6 seasons, 166 episodes	• William Hanna • Joseph Barbera	September 30, 1960 – April 1, 1966	ABC	Hanna-Barbera Productions	TV-G	Traditional
King Leonardo and His Short Subjects	Animation	3 seasons, 203 episodes		October 15, 1960 – September 28, 1963	NBC	• Total Television • Leonardo Television Productions • Format Films, Halas and Batchelor (1960-1961, season 1) • Gerald Ray Studios, TV Spots, Inc. (1960-1962, seasons 1-2) • Creston Studios (1961-1962, season 2) • Gamma Productions (1961-1963, seasons 2-3) • Jack Kinney Productions, Rembrandt Films, Hal Seeger Productions (1962-1963, season 3)	—N/a	Traditional
Top Cat	Animated sitcom	1 season, 30 episodes	• William Hanna • Joseph Barbera	September 27, 1961 – April 18, 1962	ABC	Hanna-Barbera Productions	TV-G	Traditional
The Bugs Bunny Show	Anthology	52 episodes	• Chuck Jones • Friz Freleng	October 11, 1960 – September 2, 2000	CBS (1968–1973, 1975–1985), ABC (1960–1968, 1973–1975, 1985–2000)	Warner Bros. Cartoons	TV-G	Traditional
Calvin and the Colonel	Comedy	1 season, 26 episodes	• Freeman F. Gosden • Charles J. Correll	October 3, 1961 – June 9, 1962	ABC	Kayro Productions	—N/a	Traditional
The Alvin Show	Comedy	1 season, 26 episodes	Ross Bagdasarian, Sr.	October 4, 1961 – September 12, 1962	CBS	CBS Television Studios	TV-G	Traditional
Beany and Cecil	Animation	1 season, 26 episodes	Bob Clampett	January 6, 1962 – June 30, 1962	ABC		—N/a	Traditional
The Jetsons	• Animated sitcom • Comic science fiction	3 seasons, 75 episodes	• William Hanna • Joseph Barbera	• Original series: September 23, 1962 – March 17, 1963 • Revival series: September 16, 1985 – November 12, 1987	• ABC (Season 1) • Syndication (Seasons 2-3)	Hanna-Barbera Productions	TV-G	Traditional
Tennessee Tuxedo and His Tales	• Animation • Comedy	4 seasons, 77 episodes		September 28, 1963 – January 29, 1966	CBS	• Total Television • Leonardo Television	—N/a	Traditional
The New Casper Cartoon Show		6 seasons		October 5, 1963 – January 30, 1970	ABC	• Paramount Cartoon Studios • Famous Studios	—N/a	Traditional
Jonny Quest	Science fiction	1 season, 26 episodes	Doug Wildey	September 18, 1964 – March 11, 1965	ABC	Hanna-Barbera Productions	TV-Y7	Traditional
The Porky Pig Show	Comedy	1 seasons, 26 episodes		September 20, 1964 – September 2, 1967	ABC	• Warner Bros. Television • Warner Bros. Cartoons	TV-Y	Traditional
Hoppity Hooper	Children's program	3 seasons, 104 episodes	• Bill Scott • Chris Hayward	September 26, 1964 – September 2, 1967	ABC (1964–1967)	• Jay Ward Productions • Producers Associates of Television, Inc.	—N/a	Traditional
Linus the Lionhearted	Animated television series	2 seasons, 39 episodes	Ed Graham Jr.	September 26, 1964 – September 7, 1969	• CBS (1964-1966) • ABC (1966-1969)	• Ed Graham Productions in association with General Foods • CBS Television Distribution (Syndication rights)	TV-Y	Traditional
Underdog	• Action • Adventure • Comedy • Comic science fiction • Superhero	62 episodes	• W. Watts Biggers • Joe Harris	October 3, 1964–1973	• NBC • CBS	• Total Television • Leonardo Television • Gamma Productions	TV-G	Traditional
The Atom Ant/Secret Squirrel Show	• Comedy • Adventure	2 seasons, 52 episodes		September 9, 1965 – September 7, 1967	NBC	Hanna-Barbera Productions	TV-G	Traditional
Milton the Monster		1 seasons, 29 episodes	Hal Seeger	October 9, 1965 – September 8, 1968	ABC	Hal Seeger Productions, in association with the ABC Television Network	TV-G	Traditional
The Super 6		20 episodes		1966–1969	NBC	• DePatie–Freleng Enterprises • Mirisch-Rich Television Productions	—N/a	Traditional
The Beagles	Animation	36 episodes		September 10, 1966 – September 2, 1967	• ABC • CBS	Total Television Productions	—N/a	Traditional
Cool McCool		20 episodes	• Bob Kane • Al Brodax	September 10, 1966 – January 21, 1967	NBC	• King Features Entertainment • Artransa Park Film Studios	TV-Y7	Traditional
Frankenstein Jr. and The Impossibles		2 seasons, 18 episodes	• William Hanna • Joseph Barbera	September 10, 1966 – January 17, 1967	CBS	Hanna-Barbera Productions	—N/a	Traditional
The Lone Ranger	Western	26 episodes	• George W. Trendle • Fran Striker	September 10, 1966 – September 6, 1969	CBS	• Format Films • Halas and Batchelor	—N/a	Traditional
The Road Runner Show	Comedy	4 seasons		September 10, 1966 – September 2, 1972	• CBS (1966-1968) • ABC (1971-1973)	Warner Bros. Television	—N/a	Traditional
Space Ghost		1 season, 20 episodes	Alex Toth	September 10, 1966 – September 16, 1967	CBS	Hanna-Barbera Productions	TV-Y7	Traditional
The New Adventures of Superman	Superhero	4 seasons, 68 episodes		September 10, 1966 – September 5, 1970	CBS	• Filmation • DC Comics	TV-Y7	Traditional
The Mighty Heroes	• Animation • Comedy	1 season, 20 episodes		October 29, 1966 – March 11, 1967	CBS	• CBS • Terrytoons	TV-Y7	Traditional
Birdman and the Galaxy Trio	Superhero	1 season, 20 episodes	Alex Toth	September 9, 1967 – January 20, 1968	NBC	Hanna-Barbera Productions	TV-G	Traditional
Fantastic Four	• Superhero • Action • Adventure	1 season, 20 episodes	• Stan Lee • Jack Kirby	September 9, 1967 – September 21, 1968	ABC	• Hanna-Barbera Productions • Marvel Comics Group	TV-Y7	Traditional
George of the Jungle		17 episodes	• Jay Ward • Bill Scott	September 9, 1967 – December 30, 1967	ABC	Jay Ward Productions	TV-G	Traditional
The Herculoids	Science fiction	18 episodes	Alex Toth	September 9, 1967 – January 6, 1968	CBS	Hanna-Barbera Productions	TV-Y7	Traditional
Journey to the Center of the Earth	Animation	1 season, 17 episodes		September 9, 1967 – September 6, 1969	ABC	• Filmation • 20th Television	—N/a	Traditional
Moby Dick and Mighty Mightor	Science fiction	1 season, 18 episodes		September 9, 1967 – January 6, 1968	CBS	Hanna-Barbera Productions	—N/a	Traditional
Samson & Goliath	Superhero	13 episodes	• William Hanna • Joseph Barbera	September 9, 1967 – August 31, 1968	NBC	Hanna-Barbera Productions	—N/a	Traditional
Shazzan	• Action • Adventure	1 season, 18 episodes	Alex Toth	September 9, 1967 – January 20, 1968	CBS	• Hanna-Barbera Productions • Toei Animation	—N/a	Traditional
The Superman/Aquaman Hour of Adventure	Superhero	36 episodes		September 9, 1967–1968	CBS	• Filmation • Ducovny Productions • National Periodical Publications	—N/a	Traditional
Super President		1 season, 30 episodes		September 16, 1967 – December 28, 1968	NBC	• DePatie–Freleng Enterprises • Mirisch-Rich Television Productions	—N/a	Traditional
The Banana Splits	• Psychedelia • Comedy • Adventure	2 seasons, 31 episodes		September 7, 1968 – September 5, 1970	NBC	Hanna-Barbera	TV-G	Traditional/Live-action
The Adventures of Batman	• Superhero • Action • Adventure	1 season, 17 episodes		September 14, 1968 – January 1, 1969	CBS	• Filmation • Ducovny Productions • National Periodical Publications	—N/a	Traditional
The Adventures of Gulliver	• Adventure • Comedy • Action	17 episodes		September 14, 1968 – January 4, 1969	ABC	Hanna-Barbera Productions	—N/a	Traditional
The Archie Show	• Sitcom • Musical	17 episodes	• John L. Goldwater (comic) • Bob Montana (character designs)	September 14, 1968 – January 4, 1969	CBS	Filmation	TV-Y7	Traditional
The Batman/Superman Hour	• Superhero • Action • Adventure	34 episodes		September 14, 1968 – January 4, 1969	CBS	• Filmation • National Periodical Publications	—N/a	Traditional
Fantastic Voyage	Superhero	1 season, 17 episodes		September 14, 1968 – January 4, 1969	ABC	• Filmation Associates • 20th Television	—N/a	Traditional
Go Go Gophers	Animated series			September 14, 1968 – September 6, 1969	CBS		TV-Y7	Traditional
Wacky Races		1 season, 17 episodes	• William Hanna • Joseph Barbera	September 14, 1968 – January 4, 1969	CBS	• Hanna-Barbera Productions • Heatter-Quigley Productions	TV-G	Traditional
The Hardy Boys	Cartoon series	1 season, 17 episodes	Based on the juvenile book series created by Edward Stretemeyer	September 6, 1969 – December 27, 1969	ABC	Filmation Associates	—N/a	Traditional
Here Comes the Grump	• Animated • Comedy • Fantasy	1 season, 17 episodes		September 6, 1969 – April 25, 1970	NBC	• DePatie–Freleng Enterprises • The Mirisch Company	TV-G	Traditional
Hot Wheels	Animated series	2 seasons, 17 episodes	• Fred Crippen • Eddie Smardan • Ken Snyder	September 6, 1969 – September 4, 1971	ABC	Ken Snyder Properties, in association with Pantomime Pictures		Traditional
The Pink Panther Show		11 seasons	• David H. DePatie • Friz Freleng	September 6, 1969 – August 30, 1980	• NBC (1969–1978) • ABC (1978–1980)	• Mirisch Films • DePatie–Freleng Enterprises	TV-Y	Traditional
Skyhawks		17 episodes		September 6, 1969 – September 4, 1971	ABC	Pantomime Pictures	—N/a	Traditional
Cattanooga Cats	Comedy	17 episodes	• Neal Barbera • Larz Bourne	September 13, 1969 – September 5, 1971	ABC	Hanna-Barbera Productions	TV-G	Traditional
Dastardly and Muttley in Their Flying Machines	Comedy	17 episodes	• William Hanna • Joseph Barbera	September 13, 1969 – January 3, 1970	CBS	Hanna-Barbera Productions	TV-G	Traditional
The Perils of Penelope Pitstop	Comedy drama	1 season, 17 episodes	• William Hanna • Joseph Barbera	September 13, 1969 – January 17, 1970	CBS	Hanna-Barbera Productions	TV-G	Traditional
Scooby-Doo, Where Are You!	• Comedy horror • Mystery • Adventure	3 seasons, 41 episodes	• Joe Ruby • Ken Spears	September 13, 1969 – December 23, 1978	• CBS (1969–70) • ABC (1978)	Hanna-Barbera Productions	TV-G	Traditional
Sesame Street	Children's television series Educational	56 seasons, 4736 episodes	• Joan Ganz Cooney • Lloyd Morrisett	November 10, 1969 – present	• NET (1969–1970) • PBS (1970–present) • HBO (2016–2020) • HBO Max (2020–2023) • Max (2023–2025) • HBO Max (2025) • Netflix (2025–present)	Sesame Workshop	TV-Y	Traditional/Flash/CGI/Stop-motion/Live-action

=== Co-productions ===
Title	Genre	Seasons/episodes	Show creator(s)	Original release	Network	Studio	Status
The Beatles	• Comedy • Children's • Rock music	3 seasons, 39 episodes	• Al Brodax • Sylban Buck	25 September 1965 – 21 October 1967	• ABC (United States) • ABC (Australia) • ITV (United Kingdom)	• Artransa Studios	Ended
Spider-Man	• Superhero • Action • Adventure	3 seasons, 52 episodes	• Stan Lee	September 9, 1967 – June 14, 1970	ABC	• Grantray-Lawrence Animation (1967–1968) • Krantz Films (1968–1970) • Marvel Comics Group	Ended

== See also ==
- List of children's animated films
