= Gamma Productions =

Mexican animation studio (1957–1967)

- Gamma logo, Used from 1960 to 1967
- Native name: Producciones Animadas Gamma SA
- Formerly: Val-Mar Productions (1957-1959)
- Industry: Animation studio and production enterprise
- Founded: 1957; 69 years ago
- Founders: Gustavo Valdez; Jesus Martinez Gracia
- Defunct: 1967
- Fate: Closed
- Headquarters: Mexico City, Mexico

Gamma Productions, or officially Producciones Animadas Gamma SA, was a Mexican animation studio founded in 1957 as Val-Mar Productions by Gustavo Valdez and Jesus Martinez Gracia. It is notable as being one of the first animation studios in Mexico to accept work from American production companies.

== Output ==
The studio would not begin production work until March 1959, when it entered into a contract with Producers Associates of TV (also known as PAT). As a part of this contract, Gamma Productions would begin work on Rocky and His Friends, as well as many other Jay Ward Productions titles. This was also when the studio changed its name from Val-Mar Productions to Gamma Productions.

While Ward and his associates complained regularly about the quality of work produced by Gamma Productions, the studio continued to produce animated series from not only Jay Ward Productions, but also Total Television. This work would continue until the studio's unexpected closure in 1967.

== Animated programs ==
Gamma Productions worked on many notable series for both Jay Ward Productions and Total Television; their portfolio includes:

- The Adventures of Rocky and Bullwinkle and Friends (1959–1964)
- King Leonardo and His Short Subjects
  - The King & Odie (1962–64)
  - The Hunter (1962–1964)
  - Tooter Turtle (1962-63)
- Tennessee Tuxedo and His Tales (1963–1966)
- Go Go Gophers (1964–1966)
- Underdog (1964–1967)
- Hoppity Hooper (1964–1967)
- The Beagles (1966–1967)
- Klondike Kat (1966–1967)
