= The Program Exchange =

American television program syndicator

- Formerly: DFS Program Exchange (1979–1986); DFS-Dorland Program Exchange (1986–1987)
- Type: Subsidiary
- Industry: Television syndication
- Founded: 1979
- Founder: Hill Blackett and John Glen Sample
- Defunct: 2016
- Fate: Dissolution
- Headquarters: New York, United States
- Parent: Dancer Fitzgerald Sample (1979–1987); Saatchi & Saatchi (1987–2008); Zenith ROI Agency (2008–2016)
- Website: The Program Exchange

The Program Exchange, Inc. was a syndicator of television programs. It was founded as DFS Program Exchange, Inc. in 1979, which became elongated to the DFS-Dorland Program Exchange, Inc. from 1986 to 1987. From 1986 to 2008, it was a division of Saatchi & Saatchi, an advertising agency (which acquired Dancer Fitzgerald Sample, the original owners), while merging with Dorland Advertising in 1986, and would later be acquired by Publicis in 2000. In January 2008, Publicis transferred The Program Exchange from the Saatchi & Saatchi subsidiary to its ZenithOptimedia subsidiary, the logo was then changed to reflect this move. In 2016, the programexchange.com web domain was discontinued; the shutdown coincided with NBCUniversal's purchase of one of its most prominent clients, DreamWorks Classics. The distribution rights to Jay Ward Productions content were assumed by Canada-based WildBrain in 2022.

The Program Exchange was a "barter syndicator," distributing programming on behalf of the shows' producers, many of them having their own cash distribution services. Instead of paying a cash fee, television stations who ran those programs agreed to a barter exchange (hence the syndicator name), wherein the station agreed to air a certain number of commercials for several General Mills products per program. This arrangement allowed for the programs to air on stations that may not have large budgets to acquire them. The Program Exchange typically distributed older programming that was no longer widely distributed in syndication, as well as programming designed to meet federal educational/information mandates. The Program Exchange continued to hold distribution rights to the Jay Ward Productions and Total TeleVision productions archives throughout the exchange's existence; both of those companies' programs were produced at the DFS-owned Gamma Productions studio in Mexico until that studio shut down in 1968.

The Program Exchange handled distribution for all titles listed below. The dates listed are the dates that they were distributed, not the dates they originally aired.

== History ==
From the company's beginnings as DFS Program Exchange, which was originally headquartered in Dallas, TX, the company's initial goal was to syndicate several shows that were abandoned by other syndicators, such as the Hanna-Barbera (now part of Warner Bros. Discovery) and Gamma Productions archives; the former brought them Scooby-Doo and The Jetsons. The company grew with Olympic Champions, which starred Bruce Jenner; it was the first ever live-action show distributed by DFS themselves. In 1983, it purchased the exclusive syndication rights for Bewitched from Columbia Pictures Television (now Sony Pictures Television). It also acquired the exclusive syndication rights to two other Screen Gems shows, I Dream of Jeannie and The Partridge Family. These shows were re-popularized thanks in part to a boom in independent TV stations.

In 1985, DFS Program Exchange made its first bold move by syndicating their own straight barter strip, Dennis the Menace, as well as acquiring American syndicated rights to Woody Woodpecker and Friends, which The Program Exchange began to syndicate (taking over from MCA TV) in January 1988. In 1986, DFS was bought out by Saatchi & Saatchi, which was then merged with Dorland Advertising, another Saatchi & Saatchi subsidiary; to reflect this, the company was renamed as the DFS-Dorland Program Exchange. After less than a year, it was renamed again to simply The Program Exchange. In 1992, the company picked up the off-network syndicated rights to the hit CBS Saturday morning animated series Garfield and Friends, which began barter syndication runs in September 1993. In 1997, The Program Exchange secured the syndication rights to the first 65 episodes of the original English dub of Sailor Moon. A year later, it helped DIC broadcast the remaining 17 episodes on Cartoon Network's programming block Toonami.

== Programming ==
=== Animated/children's programs ===
- The All-New Dennis the Menace (1993–2016)
- Around the World in 80 Days (1979–1983)
- Beakman's World (2008–2013)
- The Berenstain Bears (1997–1999)
- The Biskitts (1989–1994)
- Buford and the Galloping Ghost (1989–1994)
- The Bullwinkle Show, The Rocky Show and Rocky and His Friends (1979–2016)
- Dennis the Menace (1986–2016)
- Devlin (1979–1988)
- Dino Babies (1996–1999)
- Dive Olly Dive (2008–2015)
- Dragon Ball Z (1999–2000) (Ocean Studios dub)
- Dudley Do-Right and Friends (1979–2016)
- The Flintstones (1981–1997)
- Garfield and Friends (1993–2008)
- Go Go Gophers (1979–2016)
- Goober and the Ghost Chasers (1989–1995)
- The Harveytoons Show (2003–2005)
- Hulk Hogan's Rock 'n' Wrestling
- Inch High, Private Eye (1979–1993)
- Inspector Gadget's Field Trip (2008–2011)
- Jana of the Jungle (1989–1994)
- Jakers! The Adventures of Piggley Winks (2008–2014)
- The Jetsons (1979–1985)
- Jonny Quest (1979–1984)
- King Leonardo and His Short Subjects (1979–2016)
- Knights of the Zodiac (2003–2009) (DIC dub)
- Korg: 70,000 B.C. (1979–1984)
- The Mr. Magoo Show (2004–2005)
- Magical DoReMi (4Kids dub)
- Picture Pages (1984–1987)
- The Real Adventures of Jonny Quest (1997–2001)
- The Roman Holidays (1979–1988)
- Sailor Moon (1997–2004) (DIC Entertainment dub)
- Sealab 2020 (1985–1986)
- Scooby-Doo (1979–1993)
- Space Kidettes and Young Samson (1979–2016)
- Sport Billy (1982–1985)
- The Super Mario Bros. Super Show! (1998–2000)
- Tennessee Tuxedo and His Tales (1979–2016)
- Uncle Waldo's Cartoon Show (1979–2016)
- The Underdog Show (1979–2016)
- Valley of the Dinosaurs (1982–1992)
- The Wacky World of Tex Avery (1997–2007)
- Wheelie and the Chopper Bunch (1979–1993)
- Where on Earth Is Carmen Sandiego? (2001–2016)
- Where's Huddles? (1989–1995)
- The Woody Woodpecker Show (1987–1998)
- Zoo Clues (2015–2016)

=== Family programs ===
- 227 (2005–2012)
- 3rd Rock from the Sun (2008–2016)
- The Addams Family (2004–2016)
- The Abbott and Costello Show (1987–2006)
- Alfred Hitchcock Presents (1997–2002)
- Amen (1995–2002)
- Benson (2005–2010)
- Bewitched (1983–1997, 2010–2014)
- Bosom Buddies
- The Brady Bunch (1990–1998)
- B. Smith: Simply Style (2008–2016)
- Charles in Charge (1998–2008)
- Coach (1995–2016)
- The Cosby Show (2012–2015)
- Dear John (1998–2004)
- A Different World (2015–2016)
- Funniest Pets & People (2008–2016)
- Gimme a Break! (2006–2016)
- The Greats of the Game (1985–1989)
- I Dream of Jeannie
- Fantasy Island (2003–2006)
- Ironside
- The Jeffersons (2015–2016)
- Just Shoot Me! (2007–2012)
- Kojak
- Laverne and Shirley (1990–1998)
- Leave It to Beaver (1998–2001)
- Mork & Mindy (1990–1992)
- The Munsters (2000–2016)
- NewsRadio (2006–2015)
- The Odd Couple (1990–2007)
- Olympic Champions (1979–1980)
- The Partridge Family
- Taxi (2001–2007)
- That Teen Show (1986–1987)
- Three's Company (1995–2004)
- Too Close for Comfort
- Webster (1999–2004)
- What's Happening!! (2005–2010)
- What's Happening Now!! (2005–2010)
- Who's the Boss? (2004–2007)

=== Short-form programs ===
- B. Smith Cooking Vignettes
- Dr. Bob Arnot: Eat Better America
- Healthy Break by Jake
- Medical Minute
- Nutrition Minute
