= The Beagles =

- Genre: Animation
- Voices of: Mort Marshall; Allen Swift
- Narrated by: Kenny Delmar
- Country of origin: United States
- Original language: English
- No. of series: 1
- No. of episodes: 18 (36 segments)

Production
- Producer: Joe Harris
- Running time: 30 minutes
- Production company: Total Television Productions

Original release
- Network: CBS
- Release: September 10, 1966 – January 7, 1967

The Beagles is a Saturday morning animated television series that aired on CBS from September 10, 1966, to January 7, 1967, with reruns continuing until September 2, 1967. The show was produced by Total TeleVision Productions, which created King Leonardo and His Short Subjects, Tennessee Tuxedo and His Tales, and Underdog. The show was cancelled by CBS after one season, despite finishing in the top 10 for Saturday mornings; it then went into reruns on ABC from September 9, 1967, to September 2, 1968, before it quickly disappeared. It was also the last animated series produced by Total TeleVision before it was dissolved in 1969.

A soundtrack album, Here Come the Beagles, was released on Columbia Records's Harmony offshoot in 1967. The single "Looking For The Beagles/I Want To Capture You" was released on Columbia, as Harmony did not release singles.

== Inspiration ==
It is widely assumed that the show drew inspiration from the rock band the Beatles, based on the similarity of the show's name. The two characters in the band, Stringer and Tubby, were spoofs of Dean Martin and Jerry Lewis. However, the music they played bore no resemblance to anything Martin & Lewis performed, and was clearly derived from the popular music coming out of Britain at the time, as was the show's title. In 1966, small children watching cartoons on TV were unlikely to remember Martin & Lewis, who broke up ten years earlier.

== Bio ==
The Beagles were different from The Beatles in that The Beagles were a duo rather than a quartet and both members were anthropomorphic dogs. Stringer (voiced by Allen Swift impersonating Dean Martin), the tall one, played guitar, while Tubby (voiced by Mort Marshall impersonating Jerry Lewis), short, fat and wearing spectacles, played stand-up bass. They often got into trouble as a result of publicity stunts planned by their manager, a Scottish Terrier named Scotty (also voiced by Swift).

== Episodes ==
All of the episodes of The Beagles with the plots.

No.	Title	Original release date
1	"Ghosts, Ghouls and Fools"	September 10, 1966
Stringer & Tubby go to a haunted house.
2	"Dizzy Dishwashers"	Parts 1 & 2: September 17, 1966; Parts 3 & 4: September 24, 1966
Stringer and Tubby work as dishwashers.
3	"Drip, Drip, Drips"	Parts 1 & 2: October 1, 1966; Parts 3 & 4: October 8, 1966
4	"Tubby Troubles"	Parts 1 & 2: October 15, 1966; Parts 3 & 4: October 22, 1966
Stringer and Tubby join a gang.
5	"I'm Gonna Capture You"	Parts 1 & 2: October 29, 1966; Parts 3 & 4: November 5, 1966
6	"Foreign Legion Flops"	Parts 1 & 2: November 12, 1966; Parts 3 & 4: November 19, 1966
Stringer and Tubby are tricked into joining the French Foreign Legion, and are eventually captured by a group of bandits.
7	"The Braves"	Parts 1 & 2: November 26, 1966; Parts 3 & 4: December 3, 1966
Stringer and Tubby go to an Indian reserve.
8	"Man in the Moon"	Parts 1 & 2: December 10, 1966; Parts 3 & 4: December 17, 1966
Stringer and Tubby accidentally get sent to another planet after Scotty bumps into a rocket's control panel.
9	"Captain of the Ship"	Parts 1 & 2: December 24, 1966; Parts 3 & 4: December 31, 1966
10	"I Feel Like Humpty Dumpty"	January 7, 1967
Scotty has Stringer dress in an egg costume to grab the attention of a movie producer.

== Preservation status ==
According to Joe Harris, the editor of The Beagles died on the job and his widow accidentally threw out all the editing materials for the show, which included the master negatives. The series was feared lost until the original negatives and tracks were found decades later in a warehouse owned by Golden Books; the films had apparently been shipped by mistake to Producers Associates of Television, General Mills' TV film subsidiary, which owned all of Total Television's other series, and were discovered only after Golden Books had bought P. A.T.'s interests.

The original masters of this series were said to be in the possession of TTV artist Joe Harris, according to an interview Harris did for the book Created and Produced by Total Television Productions by Mark Arnold. However, it is unknown what became of those masters, as Joe Harris died in 2017.
