= W. Watts Biggers =

American novelist

- Born: William Watts Biggers; June 2, 1927; Avondale Estates, Georgia, U.S.
- Died: February 10, 2013 (aged 85); Manomet, Massachusetts, U.S.
- Occupations: Novelist; television writer; composer

Signature
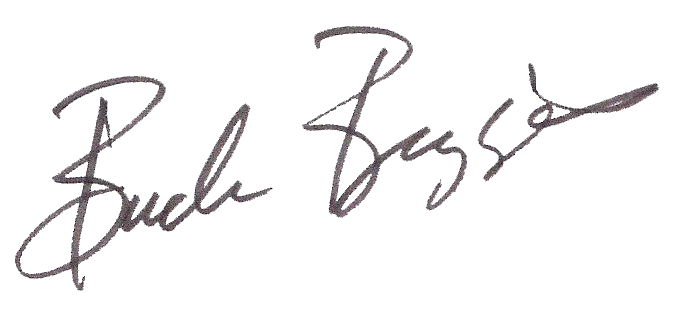

William Watts "Buck" Biggers (June 2, 1927 – February 10, 2013) was an American novelist and co-creator of the long-running animated television series Underdog.

== Early life ==
Born in Avondale Estates, Georgia, Biggers went to Avondale High where he was member of a debating team which won the state championship. Skipping his senior year of high school, he edited the school newspaper at North Georgia Military College and went on to Emory University Law School. At age 20, he headed for New York City where he struggled unsuccessfully as a pianist and vocalist, singing his own original songs. At the advertising agency Dancer Fitzgerald Sample, he began as a mailroom trainee and rose to the position of VP Account Supervisor on General Mills and Corn Products/Best Foods accounts, handling millions in billing.

== Animation ==
At Dancer Fitzgerald Sample in 1960, Biggers teamed with Chester Stover, Treadwell D. Covington and artist Joseph Harris to create TV animation in formats devised to sell General Mills breakfast cereals. Leaving Dancer Fitzgerald Sample, Biggers relocated to Cape Cod to form his company, Total Television (TTV), with animation produced at Gamma Studios in Mexico. TTV created and produced a variety of animated TV series, including The King and Odie (the studio's first program), The Hunter, Tooter Turtle, Tennessee Tuxedo, Go Go Gophers, The World of Commander McBragg, Klondike Kat and Underdog. For these series, Biggers co-wrote more than 500 scripts and composed all theme songs, words and music. The highly successful Underdog originally was telecast on NBC from 1964 to 1966, followed by a run on CBS (1966–68) and a return to NBC (1968–70 and 1972–73).

Total TeleVision folded when General Mills dropped out as the sponsor in 1969. Biggers moved back to New York as VP Promotion and Creative Services for NBC, heading a 90-person department for five years. He returned to Cape Cod for a 12-year career as a freelance writer, contributing to TV Guide, Family Circle and Reader's Digest. Biggers and Stover collaborated on the television news column, TV Tinderbox, which ran in 200 newspapers, syndicated by the Chicago Tribune-New York Daily News and later by Dallas' Tel-Aire Syndicate and King Features Syndicate.

In 1995, Biggers, Stover, Covington and Harris sold their creations to Lorne Michaels, who sold the rights to Little Golden Books, which published Underdog and the Disappearing Ice Cream. For BearManor Media, Biggers co-authored How Underdog Was Born (2005).

== Novels ==
In 1968, Ballantine Books published Biggers' The Man Inside as an original paperback. At the time, because of the author's name and the tale of a quest for higher consciousness, some readers believed the novel had been written under a pseudonym by Alan Watts. Along with a description of the characters, the story was only briefly described on the back cover as "Strange, hallucinatory, following its own inner logic down unexpected paths, The Man Inside is a novel of startling originality, a journey towards wisdom—like Hermann Hesse's Steppenwolf—that culminates in revelation." However, the opening page blurb elaborated:

The Man Inside is a novel of startling originality. It could be read as a parody of the Horatio Alger story—the orphan boy whose struggles lead him down and down until success comes at the bottom. Or a Kafkaesque pursuit of Purpose, the ceaseless quest for the meaning of life—always baffled by the cruel traps of mankind. Or a journey toward wisdom—in the manner of Hermann Hesse—that culminates oddly: satori achieved inside a robot. But such suggestions can give only a faint indication of the strange and haunting powers of The Man Inside. The rest the reader must discover for himself.

In 1999, it was reissued by Bamberger Books as a hardcover. It was optioned as a feature film by One Brick Films. His novel Hold Back the Tide concerns a lovelorn police chief who wants a hypnotist to eliminate his obsessions so he can continue solving crimes. It was published February, 2001, as a 1st Books Library ebook.

== Victory over Violence ==
Biggers was vice-president and co-founder of the Boston-based Victory over Violence "dedicated to creating a positive force in the media to offset the cynicism and negativity, which create a climate of violence," and has used Underdog to promote the organization.

Biggers created a new episode of Underdog in 1999 as a half-hour radio show, narrated by Tom Ellis. In it, Simon Bar Sinister develops a Switchpitch baseball to turn positive people negative. His attempt to become king of Boston is foiled by Underdog and Sweet Polly Purebred.

== Death ==
Biggers died of a heart attack at his home in Manomet, Massachusetts on February 10, 2013.
