= George S. Irving =

American actor (1922–2016)

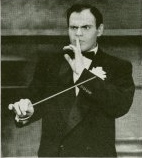
- Irving as Dario the conductor in Rodgers and Hammerstein's Me and Juliet in 1953
- Born: Irving Shelasky; November 1, 1922; Springfield, Massachusetts, U.S.
- Died: December 26, 2016 (aged 94); Manhattan, New York City, U.S.
- Occupation: Actor
- Years active: 1943–2016
- Spouse: Maria Karnilova (m. 1948; died 2001)
- Children: 2

George S. Irving (born Irving Shelasky; November 1, 1922 – December 26, 2016) was an American actor known primarily for his character roles on Broadway and as the voice of Heat Miser in the American Christmas television specials The Year Without a Santa Claus (1974) and A Miser Brothers' Christmas (2008).

== Early life ==
He was born Irving Shelasky in Springfield, Massachusetts, to Abraham and Rebecca Shelasky, as one of four siblings. His parents were Russian Jewish immigrants.

When Irving was 13 or 14, he sang in synagogues and churches as a boy soprano. By his final high school year in 1940, he heard about a dramatic school in Boston for those who were not quite draft age and who were tall and had deep voices, so he immediately received a scholarship. In 1942, he worked in the chorus of the St. Louis Muny Opera.

== Career ==
=== On stage ===
Irving made his debut in the original 1943 production of Oklahoma!, only to be drafted days later to serve in the United States Army in World War II. He received this role when one of the original actors lost his voice, and Irving went on as his replacement. He explains the following: "I wrote to The Theatre Guild when they were casting Oklahoma! and asked them to remind Oscar Hammerstein that he knew me a little, and I got an audition and was cast in the chorus".

Irving is best known to Broadway audiences for his performance with Debbie Reynolds and Jane Powell (successively) in Irene (1974), and his Tony nominated performance as Sir John in Me and My Girl (1987). At the 27th Tony Awards, he won the Tony for Best Performance by a Featured Actor in a Musical for "Irene".

In 2008, Irving recreated the three roles he originally played in the ill-fated 1976 Joseph Stein musical So Long, 174th Street, now reworked, revised, and with its original title Enter Laughing at Off-Broadway's York Theatre Company, and received rave reviews for his rendition of "The Butler's Song". Irving performed his one-man cabaret show to great acclaim at Feinstein's in New York City in November 2008. On December 8, 2008, aged 86, Irving received the 17th Oscar Hammerstein Award for Lifetime Achievement in Musical Theatre.

==== Productions ====
- Oklahoma! (1943)
- Call Me Mister (1946)
- Gentlemen Prefer Blondes (1949)
- Two's Company (1952)
- Can-Can (1953)
- Me and Juliet (1953)
- Bells Are Ringing (1956)
- Shinbone Alley (1957)
- Irma La Douce (1960)
- Bravo Giovanni (1962)
- Romulus (1962)
- Tovarich (1963)
- Anya (1965)

- The Happy Time (1968)
- Promenade (off-Broadway; 1969)
- An Evening with Richard Nixon and... (1972)
- Irene (1973 revival)
- So Long, 174th Street (1976)
- Once in a Lifetime (1978 revival)
- I Remember Mama (1979)
- The Pirates of Penzance (1981 revival)
- Copperfield (1981)
- On Your Toes (1983 revival)
- Me and My Girl (1986)
- Busker Alley (2005)
- A Wonderful Life (2005)

=== Voice acting career ===
One of his more prominent non-Broadway roles was a voice-over for The Year Without a Santa Claus, in which he played the embittered Heat Miser opposite Dick Shawn's Snow Miser. He did another voice-over for Rankin-Bass as Mister Geppetto in Pinocchio's Christmas and was the narrator of the animated cartoon series Underdog as well as the voice of Running Board on Go Go Gophers. He also voiced Captain Contagious in Raggedy Ann and Andy: A Musical Adventure. Irving also narrated the popular Scary Stories to Tell in the Dark audiobooks and a large collection of books written by Patrick F. McManus including A Fine and Pleasant Misery and Never Sniff a Gift Fish

Irving returned to television in 2008 after an absence of more than a decade to reprise his role as Heat Miser in A Miser Brothers' Christmas, a sequel to The Year Without a Santa Claus, which premiered on December 13, 2008, on cable's ABC Family (now Freeform). The show served as the network's first original animated special. The production was nominated for an Annie Award for Best Animated Television Production Produced for Children by the Los Angeles Chapter of the International Animated Film Society.

=== Television ===
Irving was familiar to television audiences of the 1970s as a result of his memorable guest-starring appearance on All in the Family as Russ DeKuyper, the loudmouthed husband of Edith Bunker's cousin Amelia. He was also a regular in the cast of the short-lived 1976 sitcom The Dumplings. Irving also did some work in commercials for White Owl Cigars in the early 1970s. He appeared as a memorable Baron Mirko Zeta in the New York City Opera production of Franz Lehar's The Merry Widow, broadcast live in 1996 from the New York State Theater at Lincoln Center for the Performing Arts; during the intermission he talked about the operetta's history and historical inspiration.

== Personal life ==
Irving was married to Maria Karnilova from 1948 until her death in 2001. They had a son, Alexander (of Oceanside, California); a daughter, Katherine Irving (of South Salem, New York), and three grandchildren.

== Death ==
Irving died in Manhattan of heart failure on December 26, 2016, at the age of 94. At this age, he had been the last surviving cast member of Underdog.

== Filmography ==
=== Film ===
- Up the Sandbox (1972) - Dr. Keglin
- The Year Without a Santa Claus (1974) - Heat Miser (voice)
- Fore Play (1975) - Reverend/Roberto
- Deadly Hero (1975) - Reilly
- Raggedy Ann & Andy: A Musical Adventure (1977) - The Captain (voice)
- Pinocchio's Christmas (1980) - Geppetto (voice)
- A Miser Brothers' Christmas (2008) - Heat Miser (voice)

=== Television ===
- King Leonardo and His Short Subjects
  - The King & Odie (1960-1964) - additional voices
  - Tooter Turtle (1960-1961) - additional voices
  - The Hunter (1960-1964) - additional voices
  - The Adventures of Twinkles (1960-1961) - Narrator
- Underdog - 124 episodes - (1964-1967) - Narrator / Tap Tap the Chizzler / several Characters (voice)
- Go Go Gophers - 48 episodes (1964-1966) - Running Board / Several Characters (voice)
- Klondike Kat - 26 episodes (1966-1967) - Major Minor / Several Characters (voice)
- All in the Family - episode - Amelia's Divorce (1975) - Russell DeKuyper
- Family - episode - From Russia With Love (1979) - Alexei Tomaszevski
- The Patty Duke Show (1963-1966) - 104 episodes- Season 1 episode 21- Let Them Eat Cake- Mr. Brown
