= Itchy Brother =

Itchy Brother may refer to:

- a cartoon character from King Leonardo and His Short Subjects
- a rock band whose members later founded The Kentucky Headhunters
