= The Man Inside (novel) =

1968 novel by W. Watts Biggers

- . Watts Biggers' hallucinatory, allegorical novel, The Man Inside, was published by Ballantine Books in 1968 as a paperback original.
- Author: W. Watts Biggers
- Language: English
- Publisher: Ballantine Books
- Publication date: 1968

The Man Inside is a dream-like allegorical novel by W. Watts Biggers, published in 1968 by Ballantine Books as a paperback original.

At the time, because of the author's name and the tale of a quest for higher consciousness, some readers believed the novel had been written under a pseudonym by Alan Watts. Along with a description of the characters, the story was only briefly described on the back cover as "Strange, hallucinatory, following its own inner logic down unexpected paths, The Man Inside is a novel of startling originality, a journey towards wisdom—like Hermann Hesse's Steppenwolf—that culminates in revelation." However, the opening page blurb elaborated;

The Man Inside is a novel of startling originality. It could be read as a parody of the Horatio Alger story—the orphan boy whose struggles lead him down and down until success comes at the bottom. Or a Kafkaesque pursuit of Purpose. the ceaseless quest for the meaning of life—always baffled by the cruel traps of mankind. Or a journey toward wisdom—in the manner of Hermann Hesse—that culminates oddly: satori achieved inside a robot. But such suggestions can give only a faint indication of the strange and haunting powers of The Man Inside. The rest the reader must discover for himself.

== Hardcover reprint ==
In 1999, The Man Inside was reissued by Bamberger Books as a hardcover. The hardback edition prompted an Epinions review by morganna53 who was familiar with the earlier paperback:

It concerns Caro, a young man who is dropped off, by a mysterious old man, at an exclusive boys' school. He has no memory of his past, although he is, upon physical examination, at least twelve years old, nor is he able to remember many things that are taught to him. With the help of the school nurse, who practices a controversial form of mental and physical therapy, he improves somewhat, but he feels the need to leave when he begins to have sexual feelings (which the therapy promotes) for her. From there, Caro is guided by only one thing: A search for purpose. Since knowledge is supposed to be found in books, he determines to read every book in the library; he moves to Staten Island because a resident of that place, whom he meets during his flight from the school, tells him, offhandedly, that there is the only place to live; he accepts, and stays with, the first job offered to him, even though he is exploited, ill-used, and underpaid; only when his wife leaves him, after giving birth to a stillborn child he later finds out wasn't his after all,(and which she had planned to sell to a disreputable adoption agency), does he think to look elsewhere. However, his ultimate goal hasn't changed; he's still after only one goal; purpose. He is tricked into virtual slavery by an old man (possibly the one who abandoned him at the school, he conjectures), and after being lured into murder by a devious, suicidal transsexual, becomes a virtual toy for the old man's grandson. Only after Caro abandons his search for purpose, by accepting this fate, does he find freedom.

So, is purpose an illusion, made by a cruel creator to give us false hope? Is the only purpose realizing that there is no purpose? Or is there only chance, and not a whole lot we can do about our fate anyway? Whatever the answer, it's the author's creativity and his ability to move quickly from situation to situation that keeps the reader interested, whether he's reading this to find the meaning of life, or because this book happens to be the one he's happened to pick up. Although this isn't always a happy book, and some of Caro's adventures are quite miserable, the book seldom lags and is never slow-moving.

== Film adaptation ==
It was optioned for a feature film by One Brick Films and featured March 27, 2006, on MySpace. This happened in a serendipitous fashion as director Kurt Burk, while waiting at a Los Angeles taco stand, wandered into a used book store and picked up the novel. Burk recalled, "It had these surreal but hopeful stories I had always wanted in my films. I felt like it had been written just for me." He contacted Biggers in 2003 and then filmed a short teaser to show how a feature adaptation could look.

One Brick's synopsis:

Caro, an adolescent amnesiac orphan, is mysteriously dropped off at a Rhode Island Boys' School in the fall of 1965. He becomes the obsession of Miss Wills, a devout former student of the famous psychologist Dr. Greeb. Miss Wills begins a controversial treatment, and, at the brink of curing him, Caro is devastated by a horrible dream and flees, penniless, to New York City. Embarking on a new journey, Caro finds a job, a place to live and an obsession: His Purpose. Before he knows it, he is married to sinister Faye, has a baby on the way and has an eminent catastrophe awaiting him. Broken and busted, Caro flees again in search of new meaning in his life. When he is repeatedly enslaved by a small time Mafioso in rural Kentucky, he gives up. Can Dr. Greeb help pull Caro back from his edge of madness?
