= Total Television =

American television production company

Total Television Productions
- Type: Private
- Industry: Animation
- Founded: 1959; 67 years ago
- Founder: Treadwell D. Covington; W. Watts Biggers; Chester "Chet" Stover; Joe Harris
- Defunct: 1969; 57 years ago
- Fate: Dissolved
- Headquarters: New York, New York, USA
- Products: Television shows Television commercials
- Owner: Dancer Fitzgerald Sample

Total Television Productions (stylized as Total TeleVision productions) was an American animation studio founded in 1959 by Buck Biggers, Chester "Chet" Stover, Joe Harris, and Treadwell D. Covington. They were executives in the advertising agency Dancer Fitzgerald Sample who had the account for the General Mills food corporation. Total was formed to create cartoon characters encouraging children to buy General Mills breakfast cereals and other products. The company mostly created cartoons for television networks such as NBC. Underdog, King Leonardo and His Short Subjects, and Tennessee Tuxedo and His Tales were among the most popular series made by the studio.

== Production and shows ==
Animation for Total Television was originally out sourced to TV Spots, but would switch to Gamma Productions as King Leonardo and His Short Subjects entered its third season (around 1961).

TV series

- King Leonardo and His Short Subjects
  - The King & Odie (1960–1964)
  - The Hunter (1960–1964)
  - Twinkles the Elephant (1960–1961)
  - Tooter Turtle (1960–1961)
- Tennessee Tuxedo and His Tales (1963–1966)
  - Commander McBragg (1964–1966)
- Underdog (1964–1967)
  - Go Go Gophers (1964–1966)
  - Klondike Kat (1966, first 14 episodes)
- The Beagles (1966–1967)
  - The Sing-A-Long Family (1960s)
  - Klondike Kat (1966–1967, last 12 episodes)

TV pilots and specials

- Gene Hattree (1964) (pilot)
- Cauliflower Cabby (1964)
- The Colossal Show (1968) (pilot, animated by Terrytoons)

Commercials

- Cocoa Puffs commercials (1960–1969)

Much of Total Television's library for post-network syndication was handled by The Program Exchange, until the company shut down in 2016. The rights are currently owned by DreamWorks Classics/DreamWorks Animation (via Universal Pictures and NBCUniversal).

== See also ==
- Animation in the United States in the television era
