= Sandy Becker =

American announcer, actor and comedian (1922–1996)

Sandy Becker with one of his many guests in 1957.

George Sanford "Sandy" Becker (February 19, 1922 – April 9, 1996) was an American television announcer, actor, and comedian who hosted several popular children's programs in New York City. The best known of these was The Sandy Becker Show, which ran from 1955 to 1968 on WABD-TV and WNEW-TV, channel 5.

== Radio actor and announcer ==
Sandy Becker was born and raised in New York City. He held local radio announcing jobs before first reaching public attention in 1947 on radio as the title character of the series Young Doctor Malone. Originally a pre-med student at New York University in the 1930s, Becker played the character on the radio for a decade, after having been the show's announcer. Becker was invited to take the role to television in 1958, but declined, in order to pursue his own television projects.

== Children's TV host ==
After Dr. Malone, Becker started working for WABD (later WNEW) TV channel 5 in New York City and began hosting a program featuring Bugs Bunny cartoons, The Looney Tunes Show, on weeknights from 1955 to 1958. A second Friday night program called Bugs Bunny Theater ran from 1956 to 1957. Becker also did also announcing, such as for Wildroot Cream-Oil ads in the television series The Adventures of Robin Hood. He also did radio spots for Crisco.

In the middle of those activities, Becker found his true calling, spun off in large part from his knack for entertaining his own three children, with his vocal and comic versatility and mimicry. This led him to his morning show, beginning in 1955. This also included cartoons, but with a novel addition: a live guest child would be “tuned in” on a large fake cardboard television, and then Sandy would bring them into the studio for a short chat. He soon added a noontime program, Sandy Becker's Funhouse, briefly in 1955. He also hosted the first year of the syndicated children's Sunday TV show Wonderama, from its six-hour premiere in September 1955, until 1956.

== The Sandy Becker Show ==
Becker would also host a weekday afternoon and evening children's wraparound program, The Sandy Becker Show, which had him playing comedic characters, performing puppet skits, engaging his viewers in informational segments and contests, and interviewing guest performers and personalities in-between the reruns of movie and TV cartoons. The show was seen weekday afternoons and evenings from Monday, March 30, 1961, to Friday, February 16, 1968. It also ran on Saturday evenings, from March 27, 1961, to September 4, 1965.

Becker's propensity for doing comic voices brought him much work in animation. His best-known work there was Mr. Wizard on King Leonardo and His Short Subjects — "Drizzle, drazzle, druzzle, drome / Time for this one to come home" — who was always indulging, then rescuing Tooter Turtle from his outlandish wishes. Becker also provided the voices for Sergeant Okie Homa and Ruffled Feathers on Go Go Gophers. The former character sounded similar to John Wayne, while the latter simply exploded into babbling gibberish whenever he explained his latest idea to stop the coyote adversaries.

On his morning and (later) afternoon children's programs, Becker created such characters as double-talking disc jockey Hambone, the addled, but brilliant Big Professor (who claimed to know the answer to every question in the world), rumpled Hispanic kid's show host K. Lastima, incompetent mad scientist Dr. Gesundheit, and — showing a flair for silent comedy — simple-minded Norton Nork, whose routines of earnest bumbling were joined only by musical accompaniment ("Playtime On Pluto" by Ron Goodwin) and a droll Becker narration that ended, invariably, with, "That's my boy, Norton Nork — you've done it again!" He also had a real bird in a cage called "Chipper".

Another aspect of Becker's humor was derived from his interaction with his (often ethnically stereotyped) hand puppets, which included; "Marvin Mouse", "Googie", the German-accented "Geeba Geeba", the English "Sir Clive Clyde", "Wowee the Indian", the space creature "Sputnik", the Latino "K. Lastima" (the name taken from the Spanish phrase "¡Qué lástima!" {"What a pity"}), and the Irish "Danny Moran".

Becker's show was so popular in the New York area, that when he began using a version of the "Hambone" song from an old 78 rpm record by Red Saunders, which was recorded in 1952, Okeh Records re-released the song on a 45 rpm record; it reached survey position #22 on local rock radio station WMCA in March 1963. For the morning show's own theme music, Sandy came to use Guy Warren's "That Happy Feeling" as recorded in 1962 by Bert Kaempfert. (The evening show used "Afrikaan Beat" also by Kaempfert.)

Becker also created the puppet "Henry Headline", who delivered lighter news to the children who watched. Becker was quoted in an early 1960s interview in 'Long Island Press", as saying it was better to introduce children to news listening on a lighter note; "the impact of a major news story might be lost to them, or it might even frighten them. They'll learn about wars and international crises soon enough. I try to keep the news as light as possible. Occasionally I'll use an item that has historical value."

In spite of this view — or perhaps because of it — Becker is warmly remembered for the manner in which he handled one of America's deepest tragedies on the air. On November 22, 1963, after the assassination of President John F. Kennedy, Becker went on the air and, quite movingly, attempted to explain to his young viewers what had happened.

== Later years and death ==
Most of Becker's programs were not preserved. Because they aired live and were not kinescoped or videotaped; they live on only in the memories of those who watched them. However, some clips have surfaced on the Internet.

After Metromedia cancelled the last of his TV shows in June 1968, Becker joined WNEW-AM as a DJ, hosting the 4:00pm to 8:00pm time slot. He spent much of his later years as a children's television consultant, helping other children's shows create puppets and characters. He became known as a mentor to new generations of children's hosts. He also did voice overs for cartoons.

"I never treated them as though they were in swaddling clothes," Becker said many years later of his young viewers. "Most kid shows regard young viewers as babies. I wanted to treat them as their parents might if they were on TV."

On April 9, 1996, Becker died following a heart attack at his home in the Long Island hamlet of Remsenburg.

== Personal life ==
In 1942, when he was 20 years old, Sandy Becker was working as an announcer at North Carolina AM radio station WBT in Charlotte. He met Charlotte native Ruth Venable when she visited the station and married her on July 20. The following year, Becker returned with his wife to New York where they became the parents of Joyce, Curtis, and Annelle. He was survived by his second wife, Cherie, whom he married in 1980, and his three children.
