= Commander McBragg =

American cartoon character

Commander McBragg is a cartoon character who appeared in short segments (usually 90 seconds) produced by Total Television Productions and animated by Gamma Productions. These segments first appeared around 1964 on the animated series Tennessee Tuxedo and His Tales, and has since appeared in syndicated prints of The Bullwinkle Show, Uncle Waldo's Cartoon Show, and The Underdog Show.

== Segment format ==
The segments opened with an image of a revolving globe and the title "The World of Commander McBragg". The Commander, a retired British officer, would buttonhole a hapless member of his gentleman's club, and relate some story filled with unlikelihoods, and outright impossibilities (as his name, Commander McBragg, would suggest), always concluding with a hairbreadth escape. For example, McBragg would point to a map on the wall (or globe) and say: "There! Zanzibar! Did I ever tell you about the time I ...?" His colleague would, despite his initial reluctance ("NO, Commander, but I-"), become engaged in the exciting tale ("Good Heavens, Commander! What did you do?"), and at the conclusion would compliment the Commander on his cleverness—usually incorporating a terrible pun—to which the Commander would usually respond, "Quite."

A few episodes ended with the suggestion that the Commander's tall tales may have been at least partially true. One episode, "The Great Bird," in which the Commander was abducted and raised by a giant condor, ended with the Commander offering his companion a ride home; then, when the offer was declined, the Commander was whisked away by a giant bird (though only the shadow of the bird is seen, with a giant feather floating from the sky in a few seconds later).

== Creation ==
The deep, gravelly voice of Commander McBragg was provided by veteran voice talent Kenny Delmar, best known for his stammering non-stop talking as "Senator Claghorn" (of which Foghorn Leghorn, the Looney Tunes character, is a parody) on The Fred Allen Show.

The character of McBragg is a classic example of the miles gloriosus, a stock character known for his military experience and dubious claims of grandeur; the tradition dates back to ancient Rome. English actor C. Aubrey Smith – from the 1939 motion pictures The Four Feathers ("War was war then") and Another Thin Man – often played roles in films similar to the exploits related by McBragg and has been cited as an influence. The stories, more often than not, were taken from or were imitations of the Baron Munchausen stories of Rudolf Erich Raspe. The Englishness of the commander, the reluctance of his audience to listen to his far-fetched stories, and the commander's insistence on telling them, suggest the influence of P.G. Wodehouse's "Oldest Member" golf stories as well. Arthur Conan Doyle also indulged the tradition with his stories of Brigadier Gerard. Other influences include the early animated character Colonel Heeza Liar, [He's a Liar] the subject of a number of animated shorts created by John R. Bray and directed by Walter Lantz, who was later known for the Woody Woodpecker franchise.

Another influence may have been Captain Geoffrey Spicer-Simson DSO, RN, a career Royal Navy officer noted for telling of his improbable exploits whose career as a surveyor took him to China, Borneo and Africa. Spicer-Simson's greatest claim to fame was winning the Battle of Lake Tanganyika during World War I with two armed motor launches named Mimi and Toutou.

A physical resemblance may have come from British character actor C. Aubrey Smith, who often appeared in British and American films as the dignified, aging, somewhat bumbling English officer and gentleman.

== Episodes ==
1. "Over the Falls"
2. "Fish Story"
3. "The Himalayas"
4. "The North Pole"
5. "Khyber Pass"
6. "Ace of Aces"
7. "Niagara Falls"
8. "Dodge City Dodge"
9. "Football By Hex"
10. "Rabelasla"
11. "Okefenokee Swamp"
12. "The Flying Machine"
13. "The Giant Elephant"
14. "The Great Bird"
15. "Chicago Mobster"
16. "The Monster Bear"
17. "The Kangaroo"
18. "The Giant Mosquito"
19. "The Black Knight"
20. "The Flying Pond"
21. "The Old Ninety-Two"
22. "Our Man in Manhattan"
23. "Oyster Island"
24. "The Steam Car"
25. "Swimming the Atlantic"
26. "Fort Apache"
27. "The Flying Trapeze"
28. "Around the World"
29. "Indianapolis Speedway"
30. "The Rhino Charge"
31. "Mystifying McBragg"
32. "Mamouth Cavern"
33. "The Astronaut"
34. "Dam Break"
35. "The Eclipse"
36. "Ship of the Desert"
37. "Egypt"
38. "The Singing Cowboy"
39. "The Lumberjack"
40. "The Bronco Buster"
41. "Echo Canyon"
42. "Tightrope"
43. "Lake Tortuga"
44. "Coney Island"
45. "Rainbow Island"
46. "The Insect Collector"
47. "Lost Valley"
48. "The Orient Express"

== Appearances in other media ==
Commander McBragg appeared in The Simpsons episode "The Seemingly Never-Ending Story" voiced by Maurice LaMarche. He was acting as the judge for a scavenger hunt between Montgomery Burns and the Rich Texan, both eccentric millionaires in the same gentleman's club, known in the episode as "The Excluder's Club" as it is known for being very exclusive.

== See also ==
- Joseph Jorkens
