= Joe Harris (illustrator) =

American illustrator and storyboard artist

Joseph Benjamin Harris III (January 5, 1928 – March 26, 2017) was an American illustrator, animator and storyboard artist. He is best known for creating the Trix Rabbit, the cartoon mascot for General Mills' Trix breakfast cereal, who debuted in 1959. He also penned the Trix rabbit's memorable commercial tagline, "Silly rabbit! Trix are for kids", which is still utilized in General Mills' advertising campaign, as of 2017. Additionally, in 1959 Harris, Chet Stover, and W. Watts Biggers co-founded Total Television, which produced Saturday morning cartoons. Harris created some of Total Television's best known characters and series, including King Leonardo and His Short Subjects (1960–1963), Klondike Kat (1963–1965), and Tennessee Tuxedo and His Tales (1963–1966). His best known character creation aside from the Trix Rabbit was Underdog, the canine star of the animated series, Underdog, from 1964 to 1967.

== Biography ==
Joe Harris was born on January 5, 1928, in Jersey City, New Jersey, to Gladys (née Golden) and Charlie Harris. He enlisted and served in both the United States Navy and the United States Marine Corps. He graduated from the Pratt Institute in Brooklyn, New York.

Harris joined the staff of the New York City-based ad agency Dancer Fitzgerald Sample as a copywriter shortly after graduating from Pratt. In 1954, one of Dancer Fitzgerald Sample's clients, General Mills, introduced Trix cereal as a sugar-coated version of its popular brand, Kix. The company experimented with a puppet rabbit for Trix commercials as early as 1955. However, Harris, then an illustrator and copywriter for Dancer Fitzgerald Sample, created the cereal's now iconic animated mascot, the Trix rabbit, who debuted in television commercials in 1959. Harris also conceived the Trix commercial's tagline, "Silly rabbit! Trix are for kids", utilized as the foil whenever children stop the rabbit from stealing Trix cereal. Harris' tagline, and his famous Trix rabbit, are still used in General Mills' Trix campaign fifty years after its first commercial.

Chet Stover, who managed the General Mills' Trix account for Dancer Fitzgerald Sample, fully credited Harris with creating the Trix rabbit in an internal memo to the company, writing, "In a business where the only thing we have to sell are ideas, it is of first importance the credit is given where credit belongs — and Joe gets all the credit for this one."

In 1959, Harris joined with several Dancer Fitzgerald Sample colleagues, including Stover and W. Watts Biggers, to co-found Total Television, which produced Saturday morning cartoons. Harris personally created several of Total Television's iconic cartoon characters, most famously Underdog, the dog superhero and star of the 1960s animated series, Underdog. Harris' also designed other notable creations, including King Leonardo, Klondike Kat and Tennessee Tuxedo. Additionally, Harris drew the storyboards for Total Television's animated shows, while Stover and Biggers, a Dancer Fitzgerald Sample account manager, wrote penned the scripts for the episodes.

Harris returned to the advertising industry after Total Television folded in 1969. He also penned and illustrated several children's books, including "The Belly Book."

Harris died at his home in Stamford, Connecticut, on March 26, 2017, at the age of 89. His first wife, Janet Opel, died in 1981, while his second wife, Vanessa Campbell, died in 2002. He was survived by three daughters, Merrie Harris, Joelle Malec, and Sophie Harris; three grandchildren, and his stepbrother, David.
