= Tennessee Tuxedo and His Tales =

American cartoon TV series

- Stanley Livingston, Tennessee Tuxedo, and Chumley.
- Genre: Comedy; Educational
- Written by: W. Watts Biggers; Chet Stover
- Voices of: Don Adams; Jackson Beck; Bradley Bolke; Kenny Delmar; Mort Marshall; Norman Rose; Delo States; Larry Storch; Allen Swift
- Narrated by: Kenny Delmar ("Tennessee Tuxedo" and "The Hunter" segments); Norman Rose/Allen Swift ("The King and Odie" segments)
- Theme music composer: Treadwell D. Covington; Joe Harris; W. Watts Biggers; Chet Stover
- Country of origin: United States
- Original language: English
- No. of seasons: 3
- No. of episodes: 70

Production
- Executive producer: Peter M. Piech
- Producers: Treadwell D. Covington; Joe Harris; W. Watts Biggers; Chet Stover
- Running time: 30 minutes
- Production companies: Total Television; Leonardo Television

Original release
- Network: CBS
- Release: September 28, 1963 – February 12, 1966

Tennessee Tuxedo and His Tales is an American animated television series that originally aired Saturday mornings on CBS from 1963 to 1966 as one of the earliest Saturday morning cartoons. It was produced by Total Television, the same company that produced the earlier King Leonardo and the later Underdog (Tennessee Tuxedo and His Tales debuted on CBS on the same day that King Leonardo last ran on NBC), and was primarily sponsored by General Mills; a co-sponsor was Pillsbury's Funny Face Drinks. The title is a play on the "tuxedo" dinner jacket worn as formal wear.

New short episodes were created for YouTube in 2014 by Chuck Gammage Animation in Toronto and Cartoon Lagoon Studios in New York. Sponsored by Trix cereal, they resided on sillychannel.com. They feature the voice talent of Chris Phillips, Robb Pruitt and Ashley Albert.

== Plot ==
The series centers on Tennessee Tuxedo, a penguin, and his dimwitted friend Chumley, a walrus. They live in the Megapolis Zoo along with friends Yakkety Yak and Baldy the Eagle. The Megapolis Zoo is run by the ill-tempered zoo director Stanley Livingston and his zookeeper assistant Flunky. In different episodes, Stanley has often threatened to skin Tennessee and Chumley alive. Four episodes featured Howler, a dog that Tennessee got from his Uncle Admiration. In addition, Tennessee competes against his rival Jerboa Jump and his later henchman Tiger Tornado.

Tennessee and Chumley regularly escape from the zoo only to find trouble outside. One recurring issue involves the gangster Rocky Maninoff who often orders Tennessee and Chumley to do his will at the point of a machine gun. Rocky is also served by a dimwitted minion named Pretzel. Whenever Tennessee proposes a hare-brained scheme, Chumley is skeptical. Typically, Tennessee assures the dim-witted Chumley that his superior intelligence will carry the day, often with his catchphrase, "Tennessee Tuxedo will not fail!" (though he more often than not does). Chumley then responds with his own phrase, "Duh, okay Tennessee!"

In the series, Tennessee and Chumley have to overcome a personal problem that children can relate to, such as operating a camera when they are hired to photograph the Mayor of Megapolis to Chumley's requiring treatment for a toothache but fearing the dentist. On some occasions, Tennessee and Chumley are assisted by their friends Yaketty Yak and Baldy the Eagle.

When faced with more trouble than they can bear, the pair turn to their friend Phineas J. Whoopee, the "Man with All the Answers". The latter knows about everything, and he often lectures the pair on diverse topics, from the physics behind the hot air balloon to how musicians become popular. His lectures are illustrated and animated on his Three-Dimensional Blackboard (sometimes referred to as the "3-D BB"), which he pulls from an avalanche of junk that falls out of his overstuffed hallway closet when he opens the door. At the end of a Mr. Whoopee lecture, Tennessee praises his mentor with the line, "Phineas J. Whoopee, you're the greatest!" Tennessee and Chumley occasionally must consult Mr. Whoopee again when they fail their first attempt to solve any problem as Mr. Whoopee snorts "But I've tried to warn you...". In a couple of episodes, Whoopee makes the pair promise him not to fool around with electricity and television, explaining the dangers involved in those fields.

Tennessee and Chumley attempt to use their newly gained knowledge to get out of the mischief they created, but they frequently end up in more trouble with Stanley Livingston (mostly due to either Chumley's screw-ups or Tennessee's lack of foresight). Episodes typically end with Stanley punishing them in different ways, from having the police arrest them to scrubbing pots and pans in the cafeteria for six months to chasing them around the zoo. There are some cases where the duo never cause trouble at all, such as performing in the music show, stopping Tiger Tornado from bullying the zoo animals, training for the Zoolympics without causing any damage or trouble (and winning), and successfully trimming a Christmas tree.

== Production ==
On a Boing podcast, Underdog creator Joe Harris explained that F.C.C. commissioner Newton Minow declared television a "vast wasteland" in terms of educational material. Efforts were subsequently made to include education in programming. He added that in this show, Tennessee and Chumley were portrayed as the ones who were being educated so that children would not feel that they were being lectured to, even though they actually were.

Occasional "back" segments included "Go Go Gophers", "The World of Commander McBragg", "Klondike Kat", "Tooter Turtle", "The Hunter", and "The King and Odie" (the first three were also commonly featured in The Underdog Show, while the last three were re-run from the earlier show King Leonardo and His Short Subjects).

Don Adams used his well-known "clippy" voice characterization for the voice of the "small penguin, who tries but can't succeed-o", which he said was an exaggeration of actor William Powell's voice. Bradley Bolke's characterization of Chumley seemed to be taken from Charlie Cantor's voice and personality of Clifton Finnegan on the Duffy's Tavern radio show of the 1940s; there, Finnegan played a somewhat similar dimwitted sidekick to the scheming but good-natured bartender Archie. Larry Storch based Professor Whoopee's voice on character actor Frank Morgan, best known as The Wizard of Oz.

Chumley would ask Tennessee a riddle before and in between the segments, in which Mr. Whoopee came up with the humorous answer on his Three-Dimensional Blackboard, usually ending with laughter. Sometimes, Tennessee would ask Whoopee a riddle and Whoopee would come up with the humorous answer.

== Voice cast ==
- Don Adams as Tennessee Tuxedo, Pretzel and the Mayor of Megapolis
- Jackson Beck as the narrator ("Gene Hattree"), Tortilla Fats
- Sandy Becker as Tiger Tornado, and the announcer
- Bradley Bolke as Chumley, Jerboa Jump, and Slippery Hood
- Kenny Delmar as Flunky, Yak, Sergeant Badge, and the narrator
- Mort Marshall as Stanley Livingston
- Norman Rose
- Delo States
- Larry Storch as Phineas J. Whoopee, and the Platypus
- Allen Swift

== Episodes ==
=== Series overview ===
Season	Episodes	Originally released		
Season	Episodes	First released	Last released	Network
1	26	September 28, 1963	March 21, 1964	CBS
2	24	September 12, 1964	February 20, 1965	CBS
3	20	October 2, 1965	February 12, 1966	CBS
Shorts	5	2014	August 18, 2014	YouTube

=== Season 1 (1963–64) ===
No. overall	No. in season	Title	Original release date
1	1	"Mixed-Up Mechanics"	September 28, 1963
After Stanley Livingston brings them to the Megapolis Zoo, Tennessee and Chumley find a job outside the zoo as mechanics. Their first customer is Rocky Maninoff who warns them to repair his car or else. Tennessee takes advice from a newspaper ad to see Phineas J. Whoopee to learn how cars work. This episode features Allan Melvin as Rocky Maninoff.
2	2	"Rainmakers"	October 5, 1963
Tennessee and Chumley get jobs as weathermen. A farmer demands they make rain for his cauliflower crops or he will use his shotgun on them. Tennessee and Chumley turn to Phineas J. Whoopee on how to make rain.
3	3	"The Lamplighters"	October 12, 1963
Tennessee and Chumley learn how lights work when the darkness prevents Tennessee from reading his book.
4	4	"Telephone Terrors or Dial 'M' for Mayhem"	October 19, 1963
Tennessee wants to have a telephone in each animal's quarters after carrying a message to the animals about Stanley's upcoming piano recital. Tennessee and Chumley turn to Phineas J. Whoopee to learn how a telephone works.
5	5	"Giant Clam"	October 26, 1963
When Stanley Livingston wants to obtain a giant clam for the Megapolis Zoo, Tennessee and Chumley sneak out of the zoo to obtain one for him. Tennessee and Chumley visit Phineas J. Whoopee to learn where they can find a giant clam and how diving equipment works.
6	6	"Tic Toc"	November 2, 1963
The Megapolis Zoo receives a clock tower. Chumley accidentally shoots an arrow at the clock and Stanley Livingston orders Tennessee and Chumley to remove the arrow. Tennessee and Chumley learn how clocks work from Phineas J. Whoopee.
7	7	"Scuttled Sculpture"	November 9, 1963
The Megapolis Zoo receives a statue of Stanley Livingston that will be dedicated to him tomorrow. When Chumley accidentally wrecks it, Tennessee and Chumley turn to Phineas J. Whoopee on how to make a statue.
8	8	"Snap That Picture"	November 16, 1963
Tennessee and Chumley get jobs as photographers. Their first job is to take the picture of the Mayor of Megapolis for his poster advertisement. How do cameras work? Tennessee and Chumley turn to Phineas J. Whoopee to teach them.
9	9	"Zoo's News"	November 23, 1963
When ordered by Stanley Livingston to spread the news to the other animals of an upcoming event, Tennessee and Chumley turn to Phineas J. Whoopee for ways to do so. Phineas tells them about newspapers.
10	10	"Aztec Antics"	November 30, 1963
When Jerboa Jump arrives at the zoo, Stanley Livingston arranges for some archaeologists to make a trip to Mexico to find some artifacts to go with Jerboa's exhibit. Tennessee and Chumley learn about the Aztecs from Phineas J. Whoopee.
11	11	"Coal Minors"	December 7, 1963
Tennessee and Chumley assemble a stovepipe oven to heat their quarters much to the annoyance of Stanley who states that their kind are supposed to enjoy the cold. They learn how coal is obtained from Phineas J. Whoopee.
12	12	"Hot Air Heroes"	December 14, 1963
When ordered by Stanley Livingston to spread the news of the town picnic at the Megapolis Zoo, Tennessee and Chumley turn to Phineas J. Whoopee for other ideas as they already tried telephone and newspapers. Phineas tells them about hot-air balloons.
13	13	"Irrigation Irritation"	December 21, 1963
During a drought, Tennessee tries to figure out how to get water to his watermelon crops. Phineas J. Whoopee tells them about different ways of irrigation. Meanwhile, Stanley Livingston is warned by the Chief of Police not to waste water during the drought on pain of arrest.
14	14	"TV Testers"	December 28, 1963
Tennessee and Chumley get jobs as TV repairmen. Their first customer is Rocky Maninoff who orders them to repair his television so that he can watch a baseball game after his job or else he'll "play a tune on his fiddle". Tennessee and Chumley turn to Phineas J. Whoopee on how a television works. Meanwhile, the Chief of Police gets word from Stanley Livingston that Tennessee and Chumley have escaped from the zoo.
15	15	"By the Plight of the Moon"	January 4, 1964
Hearing about Jerboa having been to the Moon, Tennessee and Chumley try to become astronauts to no avail. After getting knocked out, Tennessee dreams he is to be the first astronaut penguin to take a rocket to the Moon as Phineas J. Whoopee walks him through operating it.
16	16	"Lever Levity"	January 11, 1964
In a follow-up to "Coal Minors," the tunneling that Tennessee and Chumley did for their coal mine has caused the foundation of Stanley's office to settle to one side. While Stanley and Flunky go into town to find someone to build a new foundation, Tennessee tries to straighten the foundation. When nothing seems to work, Tennessee and Chumley go to Phineas J. Whoopee for help as he tells them about levers.
17	17	"The Bridge Builders"	January 18, 1964
Tennessee and Chumley get jobs as bridge builders. Rocky Maninoff wants them to build a bridge following his gang's bank robbery or else. Tennessee and Chumley go to Phineas J. Whoopee on how to build a bridge.
18	18	"Howl, Howl, the Gang's All Here"	January 25, 1964
Tennessee receives a dog named Howler from his uncle and tries to hide him from Stanley Livingston as he does not want dogs on the Megapolis Zoo's property. To make a new home for Howler, Tennessee and Chumley call on Phineas J. Whoopee who helps and advises them on building Howler a house near a lake in Megapolis Woods.
19	19	"Sail Ho!"	February 1, 1964
Tennessee and Chumley go up against Jerboa Jump in a yacht race to determine who will end up leading the Zoo's Yacht Club.
20	20	"Tell-Tale Telegraph"	February 8, 1964
Tennessee dreams that he, Chumley, Yakkety and Baldy are at a fort headed by Stanley Livingston that keeps suffering Indian attacks. Tennessee and his friends must find a way to warn the fort of approaching Indians. Phineas from the neighboring town tells Tennessee and Chumley about telegraphs.
21	21	"Rocket Ruckus"	February 15, 1964
Upon hearing Jerboa Jump brag that he has been in a rocket, Tennessee and Chumley visit Phineas J. Whoopee to learn how rockets work.
22	22	"All Steamed Up"	February 22, 1964
After Stanley Livingston has a steam locomotive put in the zoo to take children for rides, Tennessee tries to prove he can operate it as well....and proceeds to wreck it while Stanley is away. Phineas J. Whoopee explains how locomotives work.
23	23	"Tale of a Tiger"	February 29, 1964
A new animal named Tiger Tornado arrives at the Megapolis Zoo and appears to be a narcoleptic, but he becomes a fierce fighter at the sound of a boxing-ring bell. Jerboa Jump teams up with Tiger and the two make the other zoo animals kowtow to their wishes. Tennessee and Chumley consult Phineas J. Whoopee on how to defend themselves.
24	24	"Dog Daze"	March 7, 1964
In a follow-up to "Howl, Howl, the Gang's All Here," Stanley Livingston has problems with Howler the Dog when he mistakes the Mayor of Megapolis for an attacker when the Mayor of Megapolis is going to honor Stanley at an event. Stanley and the Mayor warn Tennessee to control Howler or the Mayor will have Howler detained. Tennessee and Chumley consult Phineas J. Whoopee about dog training.
25	25	"Brushing Off a Toothache"	March 14, 1964
Chumley has a toothache and Tennessee tries various ways to get rid of the tooth. When one of the attempts ends up breaking Stanley Livingston's motor scooter, Tennessee and Chumley escape from the zoo and see Phineas J. Whoopee about how to deal with a toothache.
26	26	"Funny Honey"	March 21, 1964
Tennessee and Chumley need honey for the bears of the Bearville section of the Megapolis Zoo or else they will get vicious on them. They try every attempt from the wild honeybees to no avail. Phineas J. Whoopee tells them all about beekeeping.

=== Season 2 (1964–65) ===
No. overall	No. in season	Title	Original release date
27	1	"The Treasure of Jack the Joker"	September 12, 1964
Tennessee and Chumley hear about the treasure of Jack the Joker hidden somewhere in the Megapolis Zoo, but Stanley Livingston does not allow digging on zoo grounds. They learn about compasses from Phineas J. Whoopee.
28	2	"A Wreck of a Record"	September 19, 1964
Tennessee, Chumley, and Baldy form their own folk band for Stanley Livingston's music show, but Stanley wants only singers with hit recordings for it. While Baldy goes to put up the advertisement for the music show, Tennessee and Chumley turn to Phineas J. Whoopee to learn how they can make a hit recording and become stars.
29	3	"Miner Forty-Niner"	September 26, 1964
Tennessee and Chumley find a map that leads to a gold mine and turn to Phineas J. Whoopee to learn how to get there. They learn about gold.
30	4	"Helicopter Hi-Jinx"	October 3, 1964
During a heat wave in Megapolis, Tennessee and Chumley's plans to leave the zoo to get fans for the animals are repeatedly thwarted by Stanley Livingston and Flunky. Tennessee and Chumley recall the time when they asked Phineas J. Whoopee about how helicopters work.
31	5	"Oil's Well"	October 10, 1964
Tennessee's friend Freddy Cat inherits an oil field that is supposedly haunted and Jerboa Jump tries to scare Freddy into selling him the land cheaply. Tennessee and Chumley learn about oil drilling from Phineas J. Whoopee.
32	6	"Parachuting Pickle"	October 17, 1964
When Rocky Maninoff pulls off a bank robbery and escapes by airplane, the money falls into the Lost Mountains. Tennessee and Chumley answer his ad and are forced to parachute down to recover the stolen money or else. They learn about parachuting from Phineas J. Whoopee.
33	7	"Telescope Detectives" "Private Eye Detectives"	October 31, 1964
Tennessee and Chumley become private detectives. Hotel manager Mr. Hothead hires them to deal with the robberies committed by Slippery Hood who has eluded every hotel detective. In order to get a better stake-out on Slippery Hood's hotel room, Tennessee and Chumley turn to Phineas J. Whoopee who tells them about telescopes.
34	8	"Wish Wash"	October 24, 1964
Tennessee and Chumley start a laundry service in the Megapolis Zoo for their fellow animals at the same time that Stanley Livingston and Flunky are assembling a tool shed. Phineas J. Whoopee tells Tennessee and Chumley about the different ways to wash clothes.
35	9	"The Eyes Have It"	November 7, 1964
Tennessee competes against Jerboa Jump in the finals of a bowling tournament hosted by Stanley Livingston. Jerboa tricks Tennessee into thinking that something is wrong with his eyes and gives him glasses made from the bottoms of glass bottles. Phineas J. Whoopee explains to Tennessee how the eyes work after exposing the ruse.
36	10	"Mad Movie Makers"	November 14, 1964
Tennessee and Chumley go into the movie-making business. They turn to Phineas J. Whoopee for advice on filmmaking.
37	11	"Snow Go"	November 21, 1964
Eager to cash in on the skiing craze, Tennessee and Chumley try various schemes to turn the hill at the zoo into a ski slope.
38	12	"The Big Question"	November 28, 1964
Tennessee is convinced a radio quiz show is going to call him for an upcoming cruise prize, so he goes about trying to steal Stanley's radio and eventually learns how to make his own radio from Phineas.
39	13	"Brain Strain"	December 5, 1964
Chumley looks like a local millionaire. Tennessee has Chumley impersonate the moneyed one when Chumley gets amnesia and starts to think that he is the millionaire. Tennessee turns to Phineas and he tells him about amnesia.
40	14	"Rocky Road to Diamonds"	December 12, 1964
Tennessee and Chumley get jobs at Stonecutter's Jewelry Store. Mr. Stonecutter tells them that they must protect the diamonds or they will go to jail. Rocky Maninoff robs the store and hides out on a ship. While being pursued by the ship's crew, Tennessee and Chumley run into Phineas J. Whoopee who tells them about diamonds.
41	15	"Hooray X-Ray" "X-Ray X-Perts"	December 19, 1964
When Tennessee and Chumley are ordered by Stanley Livingston to get back the rare coin with which they accidentally paid the paper boy, they trace the coin's path to a bakery and then to some cookies from that bakery that Chumley ate as the coin fell into one of the cookies. How shall they recover the coin? Tennessee and Chumley turn to Phineas J. Whoopee who tells them about x-rays.
42	16	"Food Feud"	December 26, 1964
A reporter from the Megapolis Tribune approaches Tennessee to ask him about his feuds with Jerboa Jump. Tennessee tells him about the feud between the Tennessees and the Jerboas, which Old Man Phineas was called in to resolve.
43	17	"How Does Your Garden Grow?"	January 2, 1965
Tennessee is tired of eating fish all the time and wants to grow a vegetable garden much to the objection of Stanley Livingston. Tennessee manages to get the Mayor's wife on his side and Tennessee and Chumley ask Phineas J. Whoopee for advice on growing a vegetable garden.
44	18	"Perils of Platypus"	January 9, 1965
Tennessee and Chumley get a platypus for a roommate and deny him access to the pool. When the platypus leaves the zoo and they are ordered by Stanley Livingston to get the platypus back, Tennessee and Chumley turn to Phineas J. Whoopee for help and learn that the platypus lives in Australia.
45	19	"Hail to the Chief"	January 16, 1965
Tennessee, Chumley, Yak, and Baldy get jobs as police officers. They learn about being police officers from Phineas.
46	20	"Physical Fatness"	January 23, 1965
Phineas J. Whoopee gives Tennessee and Chumley some advice on fitness when Jerboa Jump challenges Chumley to a boxing match against Tiger Tornado, so they learn about fitness from Phineas.
47	21	"Playing It Safe"	January 30, 1965
Tennessee and Chumley get involved with gangsters who pose as bankers, trying to get a stolen safe open, so they learn about locks from Phineas.
48	22	"House Painters"	February 6, 1965
Tennessee and Chumley try painting the Zoo, waste it all, learn about making paint, and do a beautiful job covering a building with clay. They learn about paint from Phineas.
49	23	"Admiral Tuxedo"	February 13, 1965
Upon escaping to the docks, Tennessee falls asleep and has a dream wherein he is the admiral of a ship ordered by the Queen to go after some pirates. They learn about navigation.
50	24	"Three Ring Circus"	February 20, 1965
Flunky informs Stanley Livingston that Tennessee and Chumley escape from the zoo in order to join the circus. At the circus, each occupation fails for Tennessee and Chumley. They learn how a calliope works.

=== Season 3 (1965–66) ===
No. overall	No. in season	Title	Original release date
51	1	"The Big Drip"	October 2, 1965
Tennessee and Chumley get jobs as plumbers. Their first customer is Rocky Maninoff who wants them to fix a leaky pipe in his hideout before he returns from his bank robbery or else. Tennessee and Chumley turn to Phineas J. Whoopee to learn about plumbing.
52	2	"Boning Up"	October 9, 1965
Stanley Livingston orders Tennessee and Chumley to guard the new dinosaur exhibit. Unfortunately, Howler gets in and dismantles the dinosaur skeletons. They learn about dinosaur bones from Phineas J. Whoopee so that they can put the bones back together.
53	3	"Smilin' Yak's Sky Service"	October 16, 1965
Tennessee, Chumley, and Yak start a flying service. Their first customer is Rocky Maninoff who wants them to fly him to safety after a bank job or else. They learn about flying a plane from Phineas J. Whoopee.
54	4	"Teddy Bear Trouble"	October 23, 1965
When Chumley's teddy bear goes missing, Tennessee turns private eye in order to find it. They learn about fingerprints (dark and light surfaces) from Phineas J. Whoopee so that they can find the culprit who took Chumley's teddy bear.
55	5	"Sword Play"	October 30, 1965
When ordered by Stanley Livingston to clean the medieval exhibit at the museum, Tennessee is knocked unconscious by a fallen suit of armor and dreams that he is a knight fighting a dragon. Tennessee learns about steel the dream version of Phineas J. Whoopee.
56	6	"Phunnie Munnie"	November 6, 1965
Tennessee, Chumley, and Baldy set up a printing press. Their first customer is Rocky Maninoff who wants them to print counterfeit money for him or else. They learn about printing from Phineas J. Whoopee.
57	7	"The Romance of Plymouth Rock"	November 13, 1965
Tennessee is putting on a play about the Pilgrims called The Romance of Plymouth Rock. Jerboa Jump and Tiger Tornado plan to join the play as Indians so that they can sabotage it. When Jerboa claims that the Indians were not friendly to the Pilgrims, Tennessee calls in Phineas J. Whoopee for help on the history of the Pilgrims. Note: Stanley Livingston and Flunky do not appear in this episode. This is also a rare instance of Tennessee being successful despite his enemies' interference.
58	8	"The Zoolympics"	November 20, 1965
The Zoolympics are being held at the Megapolis Zoo. Phineas J. Whoopee advises Tennessee and Chumley on how to be in shape for the Zoolympics.
59	9	"The Tree Trimmers"	November 27, 1965
On Christmas Eve, Stanley Livingston asks Tennessee and Chumley to guide the arriving tree trimmers to the Christmas tree. Tennessee and Chumley trim the tree with the help of Yak and Baldy until the ornaments are destroyed. Tennessee and Chumley ask Phineas J. Whoopee for help on making ornaments.
60	10	"Goblins Will Get You"	December 4, 1965
Following a trick-or-treating on Halloween, Tennessee eats too much candy and dreams that he is in a haunted forest with an evil witch and her goblin servants. They learn about maple syrup from a wizard version of Phineas J. Whoopee.
61	11	"The Cheap Skates"	December 11, 1965
Wanting ice skates, Tennessee Tuxedo, Chumley, Yak, and Baldy try producing an ice show for Yak's cousin Sewonya Button, but need to learn how to build a rink first.
62	12	"Going Up"	December 18, 1965
A Washington's Birthday celebration causes the friends to try putting a Liberty Bell decoration atop a zoo tower. They learn about elevators (cab, pulley, counterweight) from Phineas J. Whoopee.
63	13	"Monster from Another Planet"	December 25, 1965
Wanting a better life, Tiger Tornado pretends to be an extraterrestrial forcing Tennessee and Chumley into servitude. They learn about spacemen from Phineas from Phineas J. Whoopee.
64	14	"Signed and Sealed"	January 1, 1966
Tennessee's cousin Percy is coming to visit. Needing money to fix up their place, the friends rent to Big Bill Bailey with a crafty four-week lease. They learn from Phineas J. Whoopee about leases and contracts and ultimately learn that Percy can be a demanding guest.
65	15	"The Barbers"	January 8, 1966
Tennessee buys a barber shop and he and Chumley go to work as barbers. They get Rocky Maninoff as a customer who wants them to make him a new man following his bank job or else. Tennessee and Chumley turn to Phineas J. Whoopee for help in haircutting and applying specific make-up.
66	16	"Catch a Falling Hammock"	January 15, 1966
The guys learn about termites that are causing the trees holding their hammock to fall. They learn about termites from Phineas J. Whoopee.
67	17	"Peace and Quiet"	January 22, 1966
An employment agency promises jobs to Tennessee and Chumley, but they manage to fail at all of them.
68	18	"Robot Revenge"	January 29, 1966
Yak and Baldy build robots to do their work. Tennessee and Chumley turn to Phineas J. Whoopee who tells them about hearts.
69	19	"There Auto Be a Law"	February 5, 1966
Tennessee, Chumley, Yak, and Baldy build a car for an auto race and decide to make and sell copies of the car to pay the entrance fee. They learn from Phineas J. Whoopee about production line manufacturing.
70	20	"Samantha"	February 12, 1966
Chumley falls in love with a female walrus named Samantha and Whoopee tries teaching him about the finer points of etiquette and deportment.

=== Shorts (2014) ===
No. overall	No. in season	Title	Original release date
71	1	"Go South"	2014
72	2	"Be Like Baldy"	2014
73	3	"Dinner Party"	2014
74	4	"Catch the Cable Man"	2014
75	5	"Yakety Yak"	August 18, 2014

== Syndication ==
Later reruns of Tennessee Tuxedo and His Tales are quite different from the original network airings, like most cartoon series produced by Total Television. The first 34 Tennessee Tuxedo cartoons were incorporated into syndicated prints of The Underdog Show. That syndicated package actually was a revised version of another earlier (mid-1960s) syndicated series called Cartoon Cut-Ups which initially featured first season segments of Underdog, Tennessee Tuxedo, and Commander McBragg. In fact, the syndicated Underdog Show includes some artifacts such as the Cartoon Cut-Ups closing, combining portions of the original Tennessee Tuxedo and Underdog closings, effectively eliminating the punch line of the visual "Post No Bills" joke in the original Underdog closing. It also includes the final teaser at the end of the show in which announcer George S. Irving says, "Looks like this is the end...but don't miss our next Cartoon Cut-Ups show!" (the line was redubbed to say "Underdog" instead of "Cartoon Cut-Ups".)

In syndication, Tennessee Tuxedo and His Tales features different supporting cartoon segments compared to the show's original network run, including some cartoons from the Jay Ward studio. The first 39 syndicated episodes (#901–939) include "Tooter Turtle," "Bullwinkle's Corner" (followed by a vintage Rocky and His Friends commercial bumper), and "Aesop And Son." For syndicated episodes #940–945 and again from #956 through the end of the episode cycle, the supporting segments are all Jay Ward cartoons: "Peabody's Improbable History," "Mr. Know-It-All," and "Fractured Fairy Tales." Syndicated shows #946 through #955 repeat the "Tooter Turtle," "Bullwinkle's Corner", and "Aesop And Son" cartoons already shown in episodes #901–910. Each of the seventy Tennessee Tuxedo cartoons themselves appears twice over the 140 syndicated shows, in addition to the repeats of the first 34 segments as part of the syndicated Underdog Show (during a recent run on the Black Family Channel cable network, only shows #901–934 were aired).

In its first season during its original network run, Tennessee Tuxedo and His Tales featured segments of "The Hunter" and "The King And Odie". Both segments originated in the 1960 series King Leonardo And His Short Subjects, but Tennessee Tuxedo included 26 newly produced segments of both, which were not seen on the original King Leonardo program (and were not syndicated as part of that package either). The following season, "The Hunter" began appearing as a segment on The Underdog Show, and the "Hunter" spot in Tennessee Tuxedo and His Tales was filled by repeated segments of "Tooter Turtle" (a character also previously seen on King Leonardo And His Short Subjects). The "Tooter" cartoons shown on Tennessee Tuxedo were all repeated segments; no new segments were produced. Between 1968 and 1970, "Tooter Turtle" and "The Hunter" were seen as part of ABC-TV's The Dudley Do-Right Show. The 26 "Hunter" and "King & Odie" segments originally produced for Tennessee Tuxedo are seen in syndicated reruns as part of the Dudley Do-Right And Friends package (which also is different from the 1968–1970 Dudley Do-Right Show).

As both the Tennessee Tuxedo and "Bullwinkle"-related segments are now owned by different companies (the former by Universal Television and the latter by WildBrain/Ward Productions), the original syndicated format has been withdrawn from distribution.

== Home media ==
UAV Corporation released a VHS containing three episodes of the show called Tennessee Tuxedo - It's Fun to be Healthy in 1989, and later released another VHS containing the Halloween special and episodes from a few other Total Television cartoons; several more Total Television-related tapes would be released in the early 1990s.

A DVD titled The Best of Tennessee Tuxedo and His Tales was released by Sony Wonder and Classic Media in 2006. It contains 15 "sort of educational" episodes from the series. The series introduction and end credits do not seem to appear on the DVD if an episode is selected, but if "Play All" is selected, the series introduction will appear at the start of the episodes and the end credits will appear after the last episode.

One of the two "extras" on the DVD is a set of about ten audio-only outtakes from the recording of the redone version of the theme song. During the session, the engineer is heard speaking to the musicians and singers. The voice of the engineer was revealed on June 28, 2007, on The Howard Stern Show as the voice of Howard's father Ben Stern.

The other "extra" is a short collection of corny riddles (originally presented as show transitions) posed to Mr. Whoopee and his 3DBB by Chumley and Tennessee. Example: What has four legs and only one foot? A bed.

On March 6, 2012, Shout! Factory released Tennessee Tuxedo and His Tales: The Complete Collection on DVD in Region 1. On December 15, 2020, Tennessee Tuxedo and His Tales: The Complete Collection was re-released on DVD in Region 1 by Shout! Factory.

== Cultural references ==
Austin Russell, a prominent employee and cast member of the History Channel's Pawn Stars, is nicknamed Chumlee after the Tennessee Tuxedo character.

The zookeeper's name, Stanley Livingston, is a reference to the explorers Henry Morton Stanley and David Livingstone.

In British English, some words have pronunciations that are significantly abbreviated from how the word is spelled. Thus, Worcestershire is pronounced "Woostersheer". This phenomenon also occurs in some other languages, such as Russian. Chumley is how the name Cholmondeley is pronounced in Britain.
