= Underdog (TV series) =

Animated television program

- Underdog in the opening credits
- Genre: Action; Adventure; Comedy; Comic science fiction; Superhero; Satire
- Created by: W. Watts Biggers; Chet Stover; Joe Harris
- Starring: Wally Cox; Norma MacMillan; Allen Swift
- Narrated by: George S. Irving
- Theme music composer: W. Watts Biggers; Chet Stover; Joe Harris; Treadwell Covington
- Countries of origin: United States; Mexico
- No. of episodes: 62 (124 segments)

Production
- Producer: W. Watts Biggers
- Running time: 21 minutes (original series); 17–18 minutes (DVD copies); 24–25 minutes (1996 Golden Books episodes)
- Production companies: Total Television Productions; Leonardo Television; Gamma Productions

Original release
- Network: NBC; CBS
- Release: October 3, 1964 – March 4, 1967

Underdog, also known as The Underdog Show, is an American Saturday morning animated television series that ran from October 3, 1964, to March 4, 1967, starting on the NBC network until 1966, with the rest of the run on CBS, under the primary sponsorship of General Mills, for a run of 62 episodes. It is one of the early Saturday morning cartoons. The show went into syndication starting in 1969.

Underdog, Shoeshine Boy's heroic alter ego, appears whenever love interest Sweet Polly Purebred is being victimized by such villains as Simon Bar Sinister or Riff Raff. Underdog always speaks in rhyming couplets, as in "There's no need to fear, Underdog is here!" His voice was supplied by Wally Cox. When appearing as Shoeshine Boy, he described himself as "humble and lovable"; possibly a tongue-in-cheek reference to "mild-mannered reporter" Clark Kent from the opening narration of the Adventures of Superman television series.

== History ==
In 1959, handling the General Mills account as an account executive with the Dancer Fitzgerald Sample advertising agency in New York, W. Watts Biggers teamed with Chet Stover, Treadwell D. Covington, and artist Joe Harris in the creation of television cartoon shows to sell breakfast cereals for General Mills. The shows introduced such characters as King Leonardo, Tennessee Tuxedo, and Underdog. Biggers and Stover contributed both scripts and songs to the series. When Underdog became a success, Biggers and his partners left Dancer Fitzgerald Sample to form their own company, Total Television, with animation produced at Gamma Studios in Mexico. In 1969, Total Television went dormant when General Mills dropped out as the primary sponsor, though it retained the rights to the series until 1995.

=== Abroad and in syndication ===
The syndicated version of The Underdog Show consists of 62 half-hour episodes. The supporting segments differ from the show's original network run. The first 26 syndicated episodes feature Tennessee Tuxedo as a supporting segment (Tennessee Tuxedo originally aired as a separate show and also has its own syndicated adaptation). Thereafter, for most of the balance of the package, the middle segments include Go Go Gophers and Klondike Kat for three consecutive half-hours and Tennessee Tuxedo in the fourth. Commander McBragg is featured in the majority of episodes, replaced by three segments of The Sing-A-Long Family (in shows one-three, 28–30, and 55–57). The final two syndicated Underdog half-hours feature two one-shot cartoons that were originally part of an unsold pilot for a projected 1966 series, The Champion (Cauliflower Cabbie and Gene Hattree), with Commander McBragg appearing in show 61 and Go Go Gophers in show 62.

The syndicated series, as shown in the United States, is a potpourri of segments from previously aired versions of the show. Prior to a 1994 remaster, each episode included a "teaser" at the top of the show, asking viewers to stay tuned for a clip from "today's four-part story" (This originated from a 1969-1973 NBC Saturday morning rerun version of the show, though this bumper was also seen during CBS reruns in the preceding years.); however, outside of CBS-TV airings of the show, no more than two parts of the Underdog stories were ever shown in any half-hour program. There have also been different syndication packages bundled with both elements from Jay Ward's The Adventures of Rocky and Bullwinkle and Friends, and The Most Important Person short films. Prints of such would either be followed by a closing and credits or no credits at all. The closing (which showed the first portion of a variation of the Underdog theme showing a giant terrorizing the city with George S. Irving, the series narrator, saying, "Looks like this is the end! But don't miss our next Underdog Show!" in place of the theme music) followed by the end credits (re-edited from the cast credits for Underdog and Tennessee Tuxedo), originated from a 1969 repackaged syndicated series, Cartoon Cut-Ups, which originally featured Underdog, Tennessee Tuxedo, and Commander McBragg. As the Underdog, Rocky and Bullwinkle, and The Most Important Person segments are all now separately owned by different entities, the syndicated prints are no longer in distribution.

Most stories were split into 4 parts, but the first three were stand-alone stories:

- "Safe Waif", the pilot, featured a rescue from a bank vault, but no villain. Underdog is shown causing major destruction while trying to help people.
- "March of the Monsters", the first appearance of Sweet Polly Purebred, has giant robots running amok.
- "Simon Says" is the first appearance of Simon Bar Sinister. "Simon says HOLD IT!" is the maniacal refrain, as Bar Sinister uses a weird camera to turn his victims into full-sized, two-dimensional photographs.
- "Tricky Trap by Tap Tap" is the epilogue to the multi-part story "From Hopeless to Helpless" featuring Riff Raff; this episode was created due to story arcs not airing in their proper order (parts 2 & 3 of a story arc were shown in one half-hour show, then part 4 of the previous arc and part 1 of the next arc in another half-hour show).

Reruns of the show aired on Nickelodeon from 1992 to 1994, Cartoon Network from 1996 to 1999, Boomerang from 2002 to 2007, and on MeTV Toons since 2024. However, during its broadcasting on Cartoon Network and Boomerang, two notable episodes, "The Molemen" and "A New Villain", were not included on the channels' schedule due to depicted dangerous elements subjected within the segments.

In 1995, Biggers, Stover, Covington, and Harris (with General Mills) negotiated a sale of their creations to Saturday Night Live producer Lorne Michaels' Broadway Video, who later sold the rights to Golden Books Family Entertainment in 1996. Classic Media eventually inherited the rights through its acquisition of Golden Books' entertainment assets in August 2001, Eventually, in 2012, Classic Media was sold to DreamWorks Animation. TV Guide ranked Underdog as number 23 on its "50 Greatest Cartoon Characters of All Time" list, IGN ranked it as number 74 on its Best 100 Animated Series list.

== Episodes ==
All episodes featured are broadcast copies syndicated by The Program Exchange, and do not represent what was originally broadcast on both NBC and CBS. Initially, episodes of Underdog featured episodes of Go Go Gophers, The Hunter (a segment of King Leonardo and His Short Subjects), and Aesop & Son (a segment of Jay Ward's The Bullwinkle Show); Klondike Kat was not included until the show moved to CBS in 1966, and Commander McBragg segments were not featured until it aired in syndication starting in 1969.

Episode #01

- Underdog #1 (Episode 1: Safe Waif) (pilot cartoon; no on-screen title shown)
- Tennessee Tuxedo #2 (The Rain Makers) (902, 972)
- The Sing-A-Long Family #1 (Picnic) (Sing-A-Long Family cartoon titles are unofficial and do not appear on screen) (also appears in syndicated shows #328, 355)
- Underdog #2 (Episode 2: The March Of The Monsters)

Episode #02

- Underdog #3 (Episode 3: Simon Says)
- Tennessee Tuxedo #4 (Telephone Terrors or Dial M For Mayhem) (904, 974)
- The Sing-A-Long Family #2 (Skating) (also appears in syndicated shows #329, 356)
- Underdog #32 (Episode 4: Tricky Trap By Tap Tap) (Note: Tricky Trap By Tap Tap is the epilogue of the four-episode serial From Hopeless To Helpless, which is featured later in the series in shows #315 and #316.)

Episode #03

- Underdog #4 (Go Snow: Part 1)
- Tennessee Tuxedo #5 (Giant Clam) (not The Giant Clam Caper) (905, 975)
- The Sing-A-Long Family #3 (Fair) (also appears in syndicated shows #330, 357)
- Underdog #5 (Go Snow: Part 2)

Episode #04

- Underdog #6 (Go Snow: Part 3)
- Tennessee Tuxedo #6 (Tick Tock) (906, 976)
- Commander McBragg #4 (The North Pole)
- Underdog #7 (Go Snow: Part 4)

Episode #05

- Underdog #8 (Zot: Part 1)
- Tennessee Tuxedo #7 (Scuttled Sculptor) (907, 977)
- Commander McBragg #5 (Khyber Pass)
- Underdog #9 (Zot: Part 2)

Episode #06

- Underdog #10 (Zot: Part 3)
- Tennessee Tuxedo #8 (Snap That Picture!) (908, 978)
- Commander McBragg #6 (Ace Of Aces)
- Underdog #11 (Zot: Part 4)

Episode #07

- Underdog #12 (The Great Gold Robbery: Part 1)
- Tennessee Tuxedo #9 (Zoo's News) (909, 979)
- Commander McBragg #7 (Niagara Falls)
- Underdog #13 (The Great Gold Robbery: Part 2)

Episode #08

- Underdog #14 (The Great Gold Robbery: Part 3)
- Tennessee Tuxedo #10 (Aztec Antics) (910, 980)
- Commander McBragg #8 (Dodge City Dodge)
- Underdog #15 (The Great Gold Robbery: Part 4)

Episode #09

- Underdog #16 (Fearo: Part 1)
- Tennessee Tuxedo #11 (Coal Minors) (not Coat Minors) (911, 981)
- Commander McBragg #9 (Football By Tex Hex)
- Underdog #17 (Fearo: Part 2)

Episode #10

- Underdog #18 (Fearo: Part 3)
- Tennessee Tuxedo #12 (Hot Air Heroes) (912, 982)
- Commander McBragg #10 (Rabelasia)
- Underdog #19 (Fearo: Part 4)

Episode #11

- Underdog #20 (The Big Shrink: Part 1) (not Shrinking Water)
- Tennessee Tuxedo #13 (Irrigation Irritation) (913, 983)
- Commander McBragg #11 (Okefenokee Swamp)
- Underdog #21 (The Big Shrink: Part 2)

Episode #12

- Underdog #22 (The Big Shrink: Part 3)
- Tennessee Tuxedo #14 (TV Testers) (914, 984)
- Commander McBragg #12 (The Flying Machine)
- Underdog #23 (The Big Shrink: Part 4)

Episode #13

- Underdog #24 (The Bubbleheads: Part 1)
- Tennessee Tuxedo #15 (By The Plight Of The Moon) (915, 985)
- Commander McBragg #13 (The Giant Elephant)
- Underdog #25 (The Bubbleheads: Part 2)

Episode #14

- Underdog #26 (The Bubbleheads: Part 3)
- Tennessee Tuxedo #17 (Bridge Builders) (917, 987)
- Commander McBragg #14 (The Great Bird) (not The Giant Bird)
- Underdog #27 (The Bubbleheads: Part 4)

Episode #15

- Underdog #28 (From Hopeless To Helpless: Part 1)
- Tennessee Tuxedo #16 (Lever Levity) (916, 986)
- Commander McBragg #15 ("Chicago" Mobster)
- Underdog #29 (From Hopeless To Helpless: Part 2)

Episode #16

- Underdog #30 (From Hopeless To Helpless: Part 3)
- Tennessee Tuxedo #18 (Howl, Howl, The Gang's All Here) (918, 988)
- Commander McBragg #16 (The Monster Bear)
- Underdog #31 (From Hopeless To Helpless: Part 4)

Episode #17

- Underdog #33 (The Witch Of Pickyoon: Part 1) (not The Wicked Witch Of Pickyoon)
- Tennessee Tuxedo #19 (Sail Ho!) (not Sail On, Sail On) (919, 989)
- Commander McBragg #17 (The Kangaroo)
- Underdog #34 (The Witch Of Pickyoon: Part 2)

Episode #18

- Underdog #35 (The Witch Of Pickyoon: Part 3)
- Tennessee Tuxedo #20 (Tell-Tale Telegraph) (920, 990)
- Commander McBragg #18 (The Giant Mosquito)
- Underdog #36 (The Witch Of Pickyoon: Part 4)

Episode #19

- Underdog #37 (Weathering The Storm: Part 1)
- Tennessee Tuxedo #21 (Rocket Ruckus) (921, 991)
- Commander McBragg #19 (The Black Knight)
- Underdog #38 (Weathering The Storm: Part 2)

Episode #20

- Underdog #39 (Weathering The Storm: Part 3)
- Tennessee Tuxedo #22 (All Steamed Up) (not Getting Steamed Up) (922, 992)
- Commander McBragg #20 (The Flying Pond)
- Underdog #40 (Weathering The Storm: Part 4)

Episode #21

- Underdog #41 (The Gold Bricks: Part 1)
- Tennessee Tuxedo #23 (Tale Of A Tiger) (923, 993)
- Commander McBragg #21 (The Old Ninety-Two)
- Underdog #42 (The Gold Bricks: Part 2)

Episode #22

- Underdog #43 (The Gold Bricks: Part 3)
- Tennessee Tuxedo #24 (Dog Daze) (Sequel to Tennessee Tuxedo #18/Howl, Howl, The Gang's All Here) (924, 994)
- Commander McBragg #22 (Our Man In Manhattan) (not Secret Agent In New York)
- Underdog #44 (The Gold Bricks: Part 4)

Episode #23

- Underdog #45 (The Magnet Men: Part 1)
- Tennessee Tuxedo #25 (Brushing Off A Toothache) (925, 995)
- Commander McBragg #23 (Oyster Island)
- Underdog #46 (The Magnet Men: Part 2)

Episode #24

- Underdog #47 (The Magnet Men: Part 3)
- Tennessee Tuxedo #26 (Funny Honey) (926, 996)
- Commander McBragg #24 (The Steam Car)
- Underdog #48 (The Magnet Men: Part 4)

Episode #25

- Underdog #49 (The Phoney Booths: Part 1)
- Tennessee Tuxedo #1 (Mixed-Up Mechanics) (901, 971)
- Commander McBragg #25 (Swimming The Atlantic)
- Underdog #50 (The Phoney Booths: Part 2)

Episode #26

- Underdog #51 (The Phoney Booths: Part 3)
- Tennessee Tuxedo #3 (The Lamplighters) (903, 973)
- Commander McBragg #26 (Fort Apache)
- Underdog #52 (The Phoney Booths: Part 4)

Episode #27

- Underdog #53 (Pain Strikes Underdog: Part 1)
- Go Go Gophers #1 (Moon Zoom)
- Klondike Kat #1 (Honor At Steak)
- Commander McBragg #27 (The Flying Trapeze)
- Underdog #54 (Pain Strikes Underdog: Part 2)

Episode #28

- Underdog #55 (Pain Strikes Underdog: Part 3)
- Go Go Gophers #2 (Trojan Totem)
- Klondike Kat #2 (Secret Weapon)
- The Sing-A-Long Family #1 (Picnic) (also appears in syndicated shows #301, 355)
- Underdog #56 (Pain Strikes Underdog: Part 4)

Episode #29

- Underdog #57 (The Molemen: Part 1)
- Go Go Gophers #3 (Introducing General Nuisance)
- Klondike Kat #3 (The Big Fromage)
- The Sing-A-Long Family #2 (Skating) (also appears in syndicated shows #302, 356)
- Underdog #58 (The Molemen: Part 2)

Episode #30

- Underdog #59 (The Molemen: Part 3)
- Tennessee Tuxedo #27 (The Treasure Of Jack The Joker) (not The Treasure Of Jack And The Joker) (927, 997)
- The Sing-A-Long Family #3 (Fair) (also appears in syndicated shows #303, 357)
- Underdog #60 (The Molemen: Part 4)

Episode #31

- Underdog #61 (The Flying Sorcerers: Part 1) (not The Flying Sorceress)
- Go Go Gophers #4 (Gatling Gophers)
- Klondike Kat #4 (Hard To Guard)
- Commander Mc Bragg #31 (Mystifying McBragg)
- Underdog #62 (The Flying Sorcerers: Part 2)

Episode #32

- Underdog #63 (The Flying Sorcerers: Part 3)
- Go Go Gophers #5 (The Cleveland Indians)
- Klondike Kat #5 (The Candy Mine)
- Commander Mc Bragg #32 (Mammouth Cavern)
- Underdog #64 (The Flying Sorcerers: Part 4)

Episode #33

- Underdog #65 (The Forget-Me-Net: Part 1)
- Go Go Gophers #6 (Medicine Men)
- Klondike Kat #6 (Rotten To The Core)
- Commander Mc Bragg #33 (The Astronaut) (also appears in syndicated show #358)
- Underdog #66 (The Forget-Me-Net: Part 2)

Episode #34

- Underdog #67 (The Forget-Me-Net: Part 3)
- Tennessee Tuxedo #28 (Wreck Of A Record) (928, 998)
- Commander Mc Bragg #34 (Dam Break) (also appears in syndicated show #359)
- Underdog #68 (The Forget-Me-Net: Part 4)

Episode #35

- Underdog #69 (Whistler's Father: Part 1) (not Guerilla Warfare)
- Go Go Gophers #7 (Mesa Mess)
- Klondike Kat #7 (The Trap Baiting) (not Baiting The Trap)
- Commander Mc Bragg #35 (The Eclipse) (also appears in syndicated show #360)
- Underdog #70 (Whistler's Father: Part 2)

Episode #36

- Underdog #71 (Whistler's Father: Part 3)
- Go Go Gophers #8 (Termite Terror) (not Termite Trainers)
- Klondike Kat #8 (Gravy Train)
- Commander Mc Bragg #36 (Ship Of The Desert) (also appears in syndicated show #361)
- Underdog #72 (Whistler's Father: Part 4)

Episode #37

- Underdog #73 (Simon Says "No Thanksgiving": Part 1)
- Go Go Gophers #9 (Who's A Dummy)
- Klondike Kat #9 (Cream Puff Buff)
- Commander Mc Bragg #37 (Egypt)
- Underdog #74 (Simon Says "No Thanksgiving": Part 2)

Episode #38

- Underdog #75 (Simon Says "No Thanksgiving": Part 3)
- Tennessee Tuxedo #29 (Miner Forty-Niner) (929, 999)
- Commander Mc Bragg #38 (The Singing Cowboy)
- Underdog #76 (Simon Says "No Thanksgiving": Part 4)

Episode #39

- Underdog #77 (The Silver Thieves: Part 1)
- Go Go Gophers #10 (Tapping The Telegraph)
- Klondike Kat #10 (Plane Food)
- Commander Mc Bragg #39 (The Lumberjack)
- Underdog #78 (The Silver Thieves: Part 2)

Episode #40

- Underdog #79 (The Silver Thieves: Part 3)
- Go Go Gophers #11 (Bold As Gold)
- Klondike Kat #11 (Banana Skinned)
- Commander Mc Bragg #40 (The Bronco Buster)
- Underdog #80 (The Silver Thieves: Part 4)

Episode #41

- Underdog #81 (Riffraffville: Part 1)
- Go Go Gophers #12 (Up In The Air)
- Klondike Kat #12 (Up A Tree)
- Commander Mc Bragg #41 (Echo Canyon)
- Underdog #82 (Riffraffville: Part 2)

Episode #42

- Underdog #83 (Riffraffville: Part 3)
- Tennessee Tuxedo #30 (Helicopter Hi-Jinks) (930, 1000)
- Commander Mc Bragg #42 (Tightrope)
- Underdog #84 (Riffraffville: Part 4)

Episode #43

- Underdog #85 (The Tickle Feather Machine: Part 1)
- Go Go Gophers #13 (The Big Banger)
- Klondike Kat #13 (Pie Fly)
- Commander Mc Bragg #43 (Lake Tortuga)
- Underdog #86 (The Tickle Feather Machine: Part 2)

Episode #44

- Underdog #87 (The Tickle Feather Machine: Part 3)
- Go Go Gophers #14 (He's For The Berries)
- Klondike Kat #14 (Jail Break)
- Commander Mc Bragg #44 (Coney Island)
- Underdog #88 (The Tickle Feather Machine: Part 4)

Episode #45

- Underdog #89 (Underdog Vs. Overcat: Part 1) (not Underdog Vs. Overcoat)
- Go Go Gophers #15 (Swamped)
- Klondike Kat #15 (Fort Frazzle Frolics)
- Commander Mc Bragg #45 (Rainbow Island)
- Underdog #90 (Underdog Vs. Overcat: Part 2)

Episode #46

- Underdog #91 (Underdog Vs. Overcat: Part 3)
- Tennessee Tuxedo #31 (Oil's Well) (931, 1001)
- Commander Mc Bragg #46 (The Insect Collector)
- Underdog #92 (Underdog Vs. Overcat: Part 4)

Episode #47

- Underdog #93 (The Big Dipper: Part 1)
- Go Go Gophers #16 (Tanks To The Gophers)
- Klondike Kat #16 (Sticky Stuff)
- Commander Mc Bragg #47 (Lost Valley)
- Tooter Turtle #1 (Nusuiance/Subscribe)
- Underdog #94 (The Big Dipper: Part 2)

Episode #48

- Underdog #95 (The Big Dipper: Part 3)
- Go Go Gophers #17 (Indian Treasure)
- Klondike Kat #17 (Who's A Pill)
- Commander Mc Bragg #48 (The Orient Express)
- Underdog #96 (The Big Dipper: Part 4)

Episode #49

- Underdog #97 (Just In Case: Part 1)
- Go Go Gophers #18 (The Carriage Trade) (not The Horseless Carriage Trade)
- Klondike Kat #18 (Getting The Air)
- Commander Mc Bragg #1 (Over The Falls)
- Underdog #98 (Just In Case: Part 2)

Episode #50

- Underdog #99 (Just In Case: Part 3)
- Tennessee Tuxedo #32 (Parachuting Pickle) (932, 1002)
- Commander Mc Bragg #2 (Fish Story)
- Underdog #100 (Just In Case: Part 4)

Episode #51

- Underdog #101 (The Marble Heads: Part 1)
- Go Go Gophers #19 (Honey Fun)
- Klondike Kat #19 (If I'd-A Known You Was Comin')
- Commander Mc Bragg #3 (The Himalayas)
- Underdog #102 (The Marble Heads: Part 2)

Episode #52

- Underdog #103 (The Marble Heads: Part 3)
- Go Go Gophers #20 (The Colonel Cleans Up)
- Klondike Kat #20 (The Big Race)
- Commander Mc Bragg #28 (Around The World)
- Underdog #104 (The Marble Heads: Part 4)

Episode #53

- Underdog #105 (Simon Says "Be My Valentine": Part 1)
- Go Go Gophers #21 (The Raw Recruits)
- Klondike Kat #21 (Date On The Desert)
- Commander Mc Bragg #29 (Indianapolis Speedway)
- Underdog #106 (Simon Says "Be My Valentine": Part 2)

Episode #54

- Underdog #107 (Simon Says "Be My Valentine": Part 3)
- Tennessee Tuxedo #33 (Wish Wash) (933, 1003)
- Commander Mc Bragg #30 (The Rhino Charge)
- Underdog #108 (Simon Says "Be My Valentine": Part 4)

Episode #55

- Underdog #109 (Round And Round: Part 1)
- Go Go Gophers #22 (Tenshun!)
- Klondike Kat #22 (Klondike Goes To Town)
- The Sing-A-Long Family #1 (Picnic) (also appears in syndicated shows #301, 328)
- Underdog #110 (Round And Round: Part 2)

Episode #56

- Underdog #111 (Round And Round: Part 3)
- Go Go Gophers #23 (Cuckoo Combat)
- Klondike Kat #23 (Motorcycle Mountie)
- The Sing-A-Long Family #2 (Skating) (also appears in syndicated shows #302, 329)
- Underdog #112 (Round And Round: Part 4)

Episode #57

- Underdog #113 (A New Villain: Part 1)
- Go Go Gophers #24 (Kitchen Capers)
- Klondike Kat #24 (Island In The Sky)
- The Sing-A-Long Family #3 (Fair) (also appears in syndicated shows #303, 330)
- Underdog #114 (A New Villain: Part 2)

Episode #58

- Underdog #115 (A New Villain: Part 3)
- Tennessee Tuxedo #34 (Telescope Detectives) (934, 1004)
- Commander McBragg #33 (The Astronaut) (also appears in syndicated show #333)
- Underdog #116 (A New Villain: Part 4)

Episode #59

- Underdog #117 (Batty-Man: Part 1)
- Go Go Gophers #25 (The Great White Stallion)
- Klondike Kat #25 (The Island Hideout)
- Commander McBragg #34 (Dam Break) (also appears in syndicated show #334)
- Underdog #118 (Batty-Man: Part 2)

Episode #60

- Underdog #119 (Batty-Man: Part 3)
- Go Go Gophers #26 (Blankety-Blank Blanket)
- Klondike Kat #26 (The Kat Napper)
- Commander McBragg #35 (The Eclipse) (also appears in syndicated show #335)
- Underdog #120 (Batty-Man: Part 4)

Episode #61

- Underdog #121 (The Vacuum Gun: Part 1)
- Cauliflower Cabbie (Introducing The Champion!)
- Commander McBragg #36 (Ship Of The Desert) (also appears in syndicated show #336)
- Underdog #122 (The Vacuum Gun: Part 2)

Episode #62

- Underdog #123 (The Vacuum Gun: Part 3)
- Gene Hattree (The Trap)
- Go Go Gophers #27 (The Ironclad) (not The Unsinkable Iron Clad)
- Underdog #124 (The Vacuum Gun: Part 4)

== Superpowers ==
When he is not Underdog, he is incognito as Shoeshine Boy. Like Superman, when trouble calls, he hurriedly runs into a telephone booth (which would inexplicably explode upon his transmutation). On occasion, to replenish his powers, he would take an "Underdog Super Energy Pill". This pill was first introduced in episode 9. He keeps one of these pills inside a special ring he wears at all times. (Before taking one, he would often utter the words: "The secret compartment of my ring I fill / With an Underdog Super Energy Pill.") Several episodes, starting with RiffRaffville, show Underdog without his ring and being powerless, since he must take another pill as his super powers begin to fail ("Without my Energy Vitamin Pill / I grow weaker and weaker and weaker still.") and, as a result, he can die; but of course, this being a children's cartoon show, no one actually kills him, even when he is at their mercy. He tells everyone who will listen this secret of his super powers. When the series was syndicated in the 1980s and 1990s, the scenes of him taking his energy pill were edited out. In the recent release Underdog: The Ultimate Collection, the word "Energy" was replaced with "Vitamin".

Underdog is shown to have incredible superhuman powers. However, the number and scope of his superpowers are inconsistent from episode to episode, being subject not only to the conventions of superhero comics, but also to the conventions of humorous cartoons. In one episode, he easily moved planets, safely butting against them with his rear end. In another episode, his Super Energy Pill, diluted billions of times when added to a city's water system, was capable of giving normal humans who drank the water enough strength to easily bend thick steel bars. Among his many powers shown on the show are: super strength, super speed, supersonic flight, physical invulnerability, X-ray vision, super breath, cosmic vision, atomic breath, atomizing eyes, heat vision, ultrasonic hearing, a supersonic high-pitch hi-fi voice and a great calculating brain.

== Other media ==
=== Books and comics ===
- Underdog has also appeared in one Little Golden Book, Underdog and the Disappearing Ice Cream in 1975.
- Charlton Comics produced a comic book that ran 10 issues from July 1970 to January 1972, mainly adapting stories from the cartoon.
- Gold Key Comics produced a comic book that ran 23 issues from March 1975 to February 1979. Unlike the Charlton run, these featured original stories.
- Spotlight Comics did three issues in 1987.
- Harvey Comics did a one-shot in 1993, and a five-issue series from November 1993 to July 1994. These issues reprinted comics from the Charlton Comics run.
- American Mythology Comics produced a comic book that ran four issues from September 2017 to September 2018. It was followed by a Halloween ComicFest one-shot in 2019 and Underdog in Space which ran for one issue in 2020. Underdog: 1975 reprinted comics from the Gold Key Comics run.

=== Theme song ===
The show is also remembered for its title song, "Underdog", which was arranged and produced by Robert Weitz, with lyrics by Chester Stover, W. Watts Biggers, Treadwell Covington, and Joseph Harris. Several notable covers of the theme song have been made. The original song was sung by Robert Ragaini. He explained, "As a struggling singer in New York, I'd gotten a job singing a theme song for a newly proposed TV cartoon series named 'Underdog'. I went to the studio, I think 'O.D.O.' on West 54th Street, sang as part of the backup group (ah-ooo, ah-ooo), then quickly sang the theme song over the track and left. I remember how pleased I was that I'd taken that mouthful of words and made them understandable. Oh yes, they paid me 50 dollars. No contract – I wasn't yet a member of SAG – and I was thrilled to get it. Until I heard it again, year after year. By then I'd become a successful jingle singer and I knew what I should have been making. When it came out as the music track of a Reebok commercial I filed a claim with the Screen Actors Guild, but of course I had no documentation. A friend did give me an Underdog T-shirt. I wore it once, but when a man I passed on West 14th Street started singing the song, I retired it."

- The Butthole Surfers released a version included on the 1995 tribute album Saturday Morning: Cartoons' Greatest Hits, produced by Ralph Sall for MCA Records.
- Ted Kooshian's Standard Orbit Quartet included the song on their 2009 CD Underdog, And Other Stories...
- An extended a cappella version was done by The Blanks on the TV program Scrubs during the episode titled "My Hero". They later recorded it on their 2004 album Riding the Wave.
- The hip hop producer and Wu-Tang Clan member RZA sampled the show's theme song in the group's song "Wu-Tang Clan Ain't Nuttin To F' Wit" (1993), released on their debut album Enter the Wu-Tang (36 Chambers) (1993). It was later sampled as a guitar riff in Santana's "Maria Maria" (1999), also later sampled in DJ Khaled's "Wild Thoughts" (2017) featuring Rihanna and Bryson Tiller.
- The Underdog theme also was used in a commercial for the Reebok ZQuick shoes in 2014.

=== VHS releases ===
In the early 1990s, UAV Corp. released various VHS tapes of Underdog, which went out-of-print in 1995.

From 2000 to 2001, Sony Wonder released various VHS tapes and DVDs of Underdog. Each release, especially the DVD versions, included a coupon for the Underdog lithograph by the series' creator, Joe Harris.

=== DVD releases ===
Sony Wonder released Underdog Collector's Edition DVD on September 12, 2000, and again on August 6, 2002. These releases were discontinued in the mid-2000s. On July 24, 2007, Classic Media released Underdog on DVD in region 1 in a three-volume collection, following a previous three-volume set released in the late 1990s. Each volume features six digitally remastered and uncut, original broadcast episodes, each featuring two Underdog segments alongside additional cartoons from the Total TV library.

On February 21, 2012, Shout! Factory (under license from Classic Media) released a 9-disc Complete Series set containing new bonus material, including commentaries. According to Shout! Factory, "they're rebuilding the shows to their original television airing as best as they can".

=== Film adaptation ===
In 2005, Variety reported that a live-action Underdog motion picture was in development. As announced, the story introduces "a diminutive hound named Shoeshine [who] gets superpowers after a lab accident. When he's adopted by a 15-year-old boy, the two form a bond around the shared knowledge that Shoeshine is really Underdog." Actor Peter Dinklage was cast to play Simon Bar Sinister, while Alex Neuberger was cast to play Underdog's human companion, Jack Unger. The movie started filming in Providence, Rhode Island, in March 2006 and was released on August 3, 2007. The film was distributed by Buena Vista Pictures Distribution. Shoeshine/Underdog, voiced by Jason Lee, was played by a golden beagle named Leo sporting a red sweater and a blue cape. The film got mostly negative reviews, but grossed $65.3 million worldwide.

=== Radio ===
In 1999, Biggers created a new episode of Underdog as a half-hour radio show narrated by veteran Boston newsman Tom Ellis with new original music composed by Biggers. Radio stations were asked to participate in Biggers' Victory Over Violence organization by airing the adventure in which the evil Simon Bar Sinister develops a Switchpitch baseball to turn positive people negative. His attempt to become king of Boston is foiled by Underdog (played by Biggers) and Sweet Polly Purebred (portrayed by Nancy Purbeck).

=== Revival ===
Instagram artists Elena and Olivia Ceballos revealed they pitched for an Underdog revival titled Underdog Unleashed back in 2015 to DreamWorks Animation Television, since the parent company owns the Classic Media library, and eventually became part of NBCUniversal since 2016. The show would have most likely premiered as a Netflix Original series due to DreamWorks' deal with them at the time. The pitch included characters who were in the original show, along with some new ones. According to the artists, nothing went forward after the pitch.

In July 2024, the Superprod Group announced a CGI-animated revival (separate and entirely different from the Ceballos twins' pitch) of Underdog to be co-produced by Superprod Animation and Red Monk Studio, under license from Classic Media (who Superprod previously co-produced Lassie for them). M6, Gulli and RAI were announced as broadcast partners, and that the series would air in a 2025 delivery window. In June 2025, it was announced that the series would be called Underdog and the Canine Defenders and premiere in the fall of 2025, with Spanish entertainment company DeAPlaneta Entertainment joining as co-producer. Distribution rights are shared between the companies, with DeAPlaneta holding distribution for Spain, Portugal, and Central and Eastern Europe while Superights, the in-house distribution arm of Superprod Group, would handle the rest of the world. DeAPlaneta would also handle worldwide merchandising and brand rights for the revival, excluding the US and French/Italian-speaking territories. The series premiered on Gulli on November 29, 2025. This revival creates changes over the 1960s series due to modern sensibilities, including the omission of Underdog's infamous energy pill and Riff Raff being replaced by a similar villainess, Tiffy Raff.

== International broadcast ==
The series was broadcast in a handful of foreign markets. In Italy, the series aired on Italia 1 in 2001. A separate theme song by Cristina D'Avena was used in the dub. In the last few years of Pahlavi-era Iran, it was broadcast by National Iranian Radio and Television. In Japan, the first Japanese dub aired on Fuji TV from January 1968 to 1969 as Ultra Wan-chan, a second dub aired on Cartoon Network from 2000 to December 2002. The series first aired in Brazil on TVS Rio in 1979; then it was picked up for a national airing on the nascent SBT network a few years later. Redubs aired on Fox Kids and later Cartoon Network. In Ukraine, the series aired on commercial channel TET in 2010, as Песик-захисник. The series aired on the Yorkiddin' block in the early 2000s in the Netherlands.

== See also ==
- List of Underdog characters
- Suzanne Muldowney
