= Go Go Gophers =

American animated television series

- "Moon Zoom" (1961)
- Genre: Animation
- Voices of: George S. Irving; Sandy Becker; Kenny Delmar; Mort Marshall; Delo States; David Huddleston
- Narrated by: Kenny Delmar
- Country of origin: United States
- Original language: English

Production
- Producers: Joe Harris; Treadwell Covington; W. Watts Biggers; Chet Stover
- Running time: 5 minutes (as a part of Underdog); 30 minutes (as The Go Go Gophers Show)
- Production companies: Total TeleVision Productions; Leonardo Television Productions

Original release
- Network: NBC; CBS
- Release: October 13, 1964 – December 10, 1966
- Network: CBS
- Release: September 14, 1968 – September 6, 1969

Go Go Gophers is an American animated series set in the Old West that appears as a 4–5-minute-long segment within 48 episodes of the Underdog TV series and Tennessee Tuxedo and His Tales. All of the cartoon's segments were produced sometime between 1962 and 1963 but aired as part of Tennessee Tuxedo and Underdog in October 1964. It was then spun off as a separate series on CBS that aired from September 14, 1968, to September 6, 1969; however, the episodes were just repeats of the 48 segments that aired on the Underdog series. The segments also aired alongside The Space Kidettes on Saturday morning television in 1967. The show was produced by Total TeleVision Productions.

The show was unusual for Old West-themed series, in that the Native American characters always beat the cowboys.

== Plot ==
The series is set in the late 19th century, as well as the early 20th century, in the American West. There the coyote leaders of a local United States Army fort, one Colonel Kit Coyote (voiced by Kenny Delmar impersonating Theodore Roosevelt) whose name is an obvious parody of Kit Carson, and his right-hand man Sergeant Okey Homa (voiced by Sandy Becker impersonating John Wayne) who is rarely called by his name, which is a send-up of the State of Oklahoma. They make attempts to secure the town of Gopher Gulch by wiping out the last two surviving Gopher Indians (depicted as anthropomorphic gophers): Running Board (voiced by George S. Irving) and Ruffled Feather (also voiced by Sandy Becker). However, the Gophers prove to be very clever and always manage to foil the plans of Colonel Coyote and Sergeant Oakey Homa.

Whenever they came up with an idea to stop their adversaries, Ruffled Feather would break into gibberish (ostensibly the Gopher Indian native tongue) as he explained it and Running Board would understand, ask about some detail of the plan, then laugh and say "Oopie doopie! We have fun!" and/or "You-um genius!" They are also aided by Colonel Coyote's own incompetence and ineptitude and also by his constantly ignoring the advice of Sergeant Homa, who is much more perceptive. In one episode, "Introducing General Nuisance," they actually mention that they need Colonel Coyote to stay in charge so that they can continue living in Gopher Gulch, worrying that any other replacement will prove to be impossible to deal with and might succeed in his mission to remove them. Another catchphrase is when the Sergeant says, "Begging the Colonel's pardon," and a recurring gag is the Colonel ignoring the Sergeant and citing his book of army regulations (and paying the price for it). Most episodes end with the Sergeant telling the audience at home "don't miss our next adventure," suggesting that their plight will be solved by then.

Some episodes feature General Nuisance (voiced by George S. Irving) who is the commanding officer of the Colonel and Sergeant. General Nuisance would have the Colonel and Sergeant use the plans provided by Washington D.C. to deal with the Gopher Indians. These plans would often be thwarted by the Gopher Indians and these episodes often end with General Nuisance having the Colonel and the Sergeant thrown in the guard house. Some episodes also featured Corporal Crimp (voiced by Sandy Becker) who would sometimes try to strike a deal with the gophers for his own personal gain, such as buying root beer from the gophers (which the gophers spiked with Indian Hiccup Drops) for water.

Some episodes would be multi-part stories. For example, in the episode "The Raw Recruits," the Colonel enlists Ruffled Feather and Running Board into the army. But despite his best efforts, the gophers turn out to be impossible to train. This story continues through the episodes "Tenshun," "Cuckoo Combat" and wraps up in the episode "Kitchen Capers," in which the Colonel, finally tired of their antics, discharges the gophers from the army.

== Episodes ==
1. He's for the Berries – Colonel Kit Coyote falls asleep and dreams that he has eaten some berries that made him large.
2. Swamped – Colonel Kit Coyote and Sergeant Okey Homa try to rid themselves of the Gopher Indians, but their army gets stuck in a swamp.
3. Tanks to the Gophers – Colonel Kit Coyote gets a new tank to deal with the Gopher Indians.
4. Up in the Air – Colonel Kit Coyote and Sergeant Okey Homa take to the air with a rickety airplane to drop bombs on the Gopher Indians.
5. The Big Banger – General Nuisance orders Colonel Kit Coyote and Sergeant Okey Homa to haul a big cannon on top of the mountain to use on the Gopher Indians.
6. Bold as Gold – Due to the discovery of gold, homesteaders have started to move out West. The Gopher Indians do everything they can to keep them away before they take up the Gopher Indians' land.
7. Who's a Dummy – Using their skill of carving totem poles, the Gopher Indians paint exact replicas of themselves to fool Colonel Kit Coyote and Sergeant Okey Homa.
8. Tapping the Telegraph – The Gopher Indians tap the telegraph to send false messages to the Colonel and Sergeant upon intercepting the messages sent by General Nuisance.
9. Termite Terror – The Gopher Indians use a termite to turn the fort into sawdust.
10. Medicine Man – Colonel Kit Coyote and Sergeant Okey Homa guard the fort and the bologna from the Gopher Indians.
11. Mesa Mess – Colonel Kit Coyote and Sergeant Okey Homa go to Lonesome Mesa trying to capture the Gopher Indians.
12. Cleveland Indians – Colonel Kit Coyote takes the Gopher Indians to Cleveland so that they can meet the Cleveland Indians in the hopes that they will stay there. The Gopher Indians also get familiar with city life, where their antics end up annoying some of its citizens.
13. Gatling Gophers – The Colonel acquires a Gatling gun to use against the Gophers.
14. Introducing General Nuisance – General Nuisance visits the Colonel to see why the Gopher Indians haven't been dealt with yet as the Colonel claims that they aren't to be underestimated.
15. Trojan Totem – The Gophers give the Colonel the gift of a totem pole. Ruffled Feather and Running Board, concealed inside the hollow totem, come out at night to conduct raids.
16. Moon Zoom – Running Board and Ruffled Feather build a Moon rocket in order to send Colonel Kit Coyote to the Moon.
17. Indian Treasure – An ancient treasure map (that Ruffled Feather just finished painting) sends the Colonel and the Sergeant on a wild goose chase laden with traps.
18. The Horseless Carriage Trade – It's a race between the Colonel and the Sergeant in their horse and carriage, and Ruffled Feather and Running Board in their horseless carriage.
19. Honey Fun – Colonel Kit Coyote and Sergeant Okey Homa try to take back the honey that the Gopher Indians keep stealing.
20. The Colonel Cleans Up – Using a big vacuum cleaner, Colonel Kit Coyote plans to clean up Gopher Gulch of the Gopher Indians.
21. The Raw Recruits – The Colonel drafts Ruffled Feather and Running Board into the U.S. Army.
22. Tenshun – When the Gopher recruits wash out as infantrymen, the Colonel tries to train them to be artillerymen.
23. Cuckoo Combat – The Colonel tries to teach the Gopher recruits unarmed self-defense according to the Army manual.
24. The Unsinkable Ironclad – Borrowing the Navy's latest warship, Colonel Kit Coyote tries to clean up Gopher Gulch.
25. Amusement Park – The Gopher Indians take over an amusement park.
26. Crash Diet – Again interfering with the telegraph service, the Gopher Indians create a fake telegram to make Colonel Kit Coyote lose weight by the time General Nuisance shows up.
27. Wild Wild Flowers – Aunt Flora comes to the fort and plants flowers on the Army's weapons. Sergeant Okey Homa is absent in the first two episodes.
28. Look Out! Here Comes Aunt Flora – The Colonel is determined to see to it that his meddlesome Aunt Flora does not come to the fort. Ruffled Feather and Running Board are just as determined to see to it that she does.
29. Root Beer Riot – Colonial Kit Coyote and Sergeant Okey Homa prevent the Gopher Indians from getting water. The Gopher Indians do everything to get water back.
30. Tricky Teepee Trap – Colonel Kit Coyote and Sergeant Okey Homa build a teepee to trap the Gopher Indians.
31. Three Ring Circus – When the Gophers are denied the opportunity to perform in the Army circus, Ruffled Feather and Running Board crash the rehearsals.
32. Don't Fence Me In – Colonel Kit Coyote and Sergeant Okey Homa build a fence around Gopher Gulch, but they become the ones who are locked out.
33. Locked Out – Colonel Kit Coyote orders Corporal Crimp to get the key, but the Gopher Indians play a trick on Corporal Crimp.
34. Hotel Headaches – Colonel Kit Coyote brings the Gopher Indians to a hotel, where the Gopher Indians damage the hotel's property.
35. Choo Choo Chase – Having finally captured the Gophers, the Colonel and the Sergeant are transporting them to the reservation by rail. But Ruffled Feather and Running Board escape custody, and a wild train ride ensues.
36. Rocket Ruckus – The Colonel acquires a number of Army rockets to launch against the Gophers.
37. Go Go Gamblers – The Colonel and the Sergeant disguise themselves as riverboat casino operators, hoping to entice the Gophers into putting their land at wager on games of chance. But the games are rigged!
38. Radio Raid – The Colonel communicates with the Sergeant by 2-way radio to direct cannon fire at the Gophers.
39. Steam Roller – The Colonel acquires a steam roller with the intention of using it to flatten the Gophers' teepee.
40. Mutiny a Go-Go – The Colonel invites the Gophers on an ocean cruise to an exotic island – where he plans to maroon them.
41. Marooned on Cannibal Island – The Colonel's plan to maroon the Gophers on an exotic island backfires. He and the Sergeant end up marooned instead – and the island is inhabited by cannibals!
42. The Indian Giver – The Colonel acquires an electronic device called an Indian Giver, which detects Indians and Gives their location.
43. The Big Pow-Wow – Running Board calls for a pow-wow of all area tribes, figuring that a full-scale attack on Fort Gopher can succeed, despite the Colonel's Indian Giver detection device. During the attack, the Gophers steal the Indian Giver.
44. Back to the Indians – The Gophers alter the stolen Indian Giver detection device so that it detects everything EXCEPT Indians. Then they make sure that the Colonel finds it.
45. California Here We Come – Colonel Kit Coyote and Sergeant Okey Homa race the Gopher Indians to California for a contest.
46. Blankety-Blank Blanket – The Gopher Indians get a new blanket by robbing a stagecoach.
47. The Great White Stallion – The Colonel wants to capture a wild horse known as the Great White Stallion.
48. Kitchen Capers – Colonel Coyote gives the Gopher recruits one last chance to make it as Army men – he puts them to work in the Fort Gopher kitchen. Unfortunately for Colonel Coyote, the Gophers make a super-spicy soup and gunpowder biscuits; a furious Colonel Coyote is last seen chasing the two laughing Gophers while throwing "exploding" biscuits at them!
