= Klondike Kat =

American television cartoon series

Klondike Kat is a cartoon produced by Total Television and originally aired as part of Underdog, Tooter Turtle, and The Beagles on CBS-TV in 1966.

== Synopsis ==
Klondike Kat (voiced by Mort Marshall) is an anthropomorphic wild cat member of the Klondike Kops, a parody of the Royal Canadian Mounted Police. His commanding officer was Major Minor, and he was stationed at Fort Frazzle in the Yukon.

Klondike was always pursuing a mouse with a French accent named Savoir Fare (how his name is spelled on show's wanted posters), who had an appreciation of gourmet food. The mouse had a loyal Malamutt who pulled Savoir Fare in a dog sled. Klondike Kat's catchphrase was "I'll make mincemeat out of that mouse!"

Clumsy and incompetent, Klondike Kat appeared to be no match for Savoir Fare, but he never gave up, and so won in the end.

== Episodes ==
No.	Title	Directed by	Written by	Original release date
1	"Honor at Steak"	TBD	TBD	1966
Major Minor assigns Klondike Kat to stop Savoir Fare from stealing food, only to have the mouse steal the steaks the two Klondike Kops were about to eat. (4:20 long)
2	"Secret Weapon"	TBD	TBD	1966
Klondike is putting up Wanted posters, but Savoir Fare immediately pulls them down, so Klondike invents a secret weapon to stop him. (5:03 long)
3	"The Big Fromage"	TBD	TBD	1966
Major Minor leaves Klondike in charge of guarding his newly arrived cheese. Savoir Fare steals it, but Klondike is able to rescue the cheese.(4:52 long)
4	"Hard to Guard"	TBD	TBD	1966
Klondike is put in charge of guarding the fort's food supply. Malamute and Savoir Fare try many ways to steal the food but Klondike wins in the end. (4:52 long)
5	"The Candy Mine"	TBD	TBD	1966
Someone is stealing from the Candy Mine. Klondike discovers Savoir Fare is behind the crime. (4:49 long)
6	"Rotten to the Core"	Unknown	Unknown	October 20, 1964
Fort Frazzel's new crate of apples is nothing but apple cores. Klondike discovers Savoir Fare is at the top of a sheer mountain, so he must find a way to the top. (5:02 long)
7	"The Trap Baiting"	TBD	TBD	1966
Savoir Fare eats Major Minor's roast turkey. Klondike sets a trap for him using food as bait, but catches a bear by mistake.(5:01 long)
8	"Gravy Train"	TBD	TBD	1966
Klondike is put in charge of delivering roast beef to Fort Frazzle by railroad. Savoir Fare tricks Klondike out of the railroad car, but Klondike is still able arrest the mouse. (4:49 long)
9	"Cream Puff Buff"	TBD	TBD	1966
Klondike is told to buy cream puffs for the governor's visit, but Savoir Fare and Malamute fasten Klondike's snow shoes to the floor. Klondike is still able to stop the theft. (4:51 long)
10	"Plane Food"	TBD	TBD	1966
Savoir Fare steals all of the fort's food supply so Klondike is sent out with an airplane to bring back more supplies. The mouse comes onboard the food-laden vehicle, the plane goes into a tail spin, but fortunately it crashes into the fort's mess hall. (4:51 long)
11	"Banana Skinned"	TBD	TBD	1966
Klondike is put in charge of guarding bananas, Savoir Fare tries to steal them, but Klondike fools him with dynamite painted yellow. (4:50 long)
12	"Up a Tree"	TBD	TBD	1966
Savoir Fare steals Major Minor's food, and takes it to the top of a tree. Klondike keeps trying to climb up ladders to arrest the mouse, and finally succeeds. (5:03 long)
13	"Pie Fly"	TBD	TBD	1966
Klondike uses a pie as bait to catch Savoir Fare, but the mouse eats the pie without falling into the trap. In the end Klondike gets his mouse. (4:51 long)
14	"Jail Break"	TBD	TBD	1966
Klondike uses cheese as bait to catch Savoir Fare. The mouse is put in jail, but Savoir Fare says Klondike will be out of a job without him to catch. (4:51 long)
15	"Fort Frazzle Frolics"	TBD	TBD	1966
First prize in the Fort Frazzle Frolics is a chocolate cake. Savoir Fare, dressed as a Klondike Kop, wins all the contests. (4:26 long)
16	"Sticky Stuff"	TBD	TBD	1966
Klondike uses super glue to trap Savoir Fare, but Klondike and Major Minor are the ones who gets stuck. (4:21 long)
17	"Who's a Pill"	TBD	TBD	1966
A psychiatrist gives Klondike a pill that will make Savoir Fare do whatever he’s commanded, but Klondike is the one who takes the pill.(4:22 long)
18	"Getting the Air"	TBD	TBD	1966
Klondike is in New York City getting rare cheese. The city police gives him a hot air ballon to get home, but Savoir Fare sneaks on board. (4:22 long)
19	"If I'd Known You Was Coming"	TBD	TBD	1966
Major Minor is baking a cake, but Savoir Fare finds out about it. Can Klondike stop the mouse? (4:25 long)
20	"The Big Race"	TBD	TBD	1966
Klondike builds a motorized sled to keep Savoir Fare from winning the annual sled race. (4:22 long)
21	"Date on the Desert"	TBD	TBD	1966
Klondike Kat is in the Klondobi Desert to get dates (fruit) for Fort Frazzle, but Savoir Fare tries to rob him. (5:05 long)
22	"Klondike Goes to Town"	TBD	TBD	1966
Klondike is sent to the roughest place in town in search of Savoir Fare, but the mouse keeps tricking him. (4:23 long)
23	"Motorcycle Mountie"	TBD	TBD	1966
Savoir Fare steals the Klondike Kops' dinner, but Klondike Kat goes after him on a motorcycle. (4:32 long)
24	"Island in the Sky"	TBD	TBD	1966
Savoir Fare is staying on a tiny island, but Klondike goes after him in a boat. When that fails Klondike is shot out of a cannon. (5:04 long)
25	"Island Hideout"	TBD	TBD	1966
Savoir Fare is on another island, and Klondike tries many ways to capture him. (4:27 long)
26	"The Kat Napper"	TBD	TBD	1966
Savoir Fare and Malamute steal all of the fort's food. Klondike goes after them, but the mouse has placed a device in Klondike's hat that makes him take naps. (4:25 long)

== Characters' name legacy ==
- NHL hockey player Denis Savard was nicknamed "Savoir Faire" after the mouse "Savoir Fare" on Klondike Kat
- Rapper Andre Parish uses the stage name of Klondike Kat.
