= Tooter Turtle =

American animated television series

- Voices of: Allen Swift; Sandy Becker (most episodes); Frank Milano (2 episodes)
- Country of origin: United States
- Original language: English
- No. of seasons: 3
- No. of episodes: 39

Production
- Executive producer: Peter M. Piech
- Running time: 5 minutes
- Production companies: Total Television; Leonardo Television Productions; TV Spots, Inc. / Creston Studios (seasons 1–2) Gamma Productions (seasons 3)

Original release
- Network: NBC
- Release: October 22, 1960 – March 30, 1963

Tooter Turtle is an American animated television series about a turtle which first appeared on TV in 1960, as a segment of the King Leonardo and His Short Subjects program. Tooter Turtle debuted on NBC, on Saturday, October 22, 1960, and ran for 39 original episodes through the conclusion of the original Short Subjects series in early 1963. These episodes were later rerun as backups on other cartoon shows, but no more original episodes were made.

The main premise is that Mr. Wizard will use his magic to send Tooter Turtle into time traveling adventures.

At the end of each episode after Tooter is saved, Mr. Wizard repeats the moral, "Be just what you is, not what you is not!"

== Plot ==
The plots followed the same general format. Tooter (voiced by Allen Swift) calls on his friend Mr. Wizard the Lizard (voiced by Sandy Becker, or Frank Milano in 2 episodes) an anthropomorphic lizard wearing a wizard cone hat, a robe, and pince-nez eyeglasses. Mr. Wizard lived in a tiny cardboard box at the base of a tall tree. The introductory segment has Tooter knocking on the cardboard box, with "another favor to ask." From inside the box, Mr. Wizard shrinks Tooter small enough to enter through the box's front door and invites him in.

Mr. Wizard has the magic to change Tooter's life to some other destiny, usually sending him time traveling into the past or teleporting him to various locales. As Tooter is fulfilling his destiny, Mr. Wizard narrates the story. When Tooter's trip finally becomes a catastrophe, Tooter requests help with a cry of "Help me, Mr. Wizard, I don't want to be X any more!" where X is whatever destiny Tooter has entered. Mr. Wizard then rescues Tooter with the incantation, "Drizzle, Drazzle, Druzzle, Drome, time for this one to come home." At the end of some episodes, Mr. Wizard always gives Tooter the same advice: "Be just what you is, not what you is not. Folks what do this has the happiest lot."

== List of episodes ==
(ran as part of King Leonardo & His Short Subjects from October 22, 1960 to March 30, 1963)

- Highway Petrolman (Road Block-Head)
- Two Gun Turtle
- Tailspin Tooter (Plane Failure)
- Knight of the Square Table (The Joust and the Unjoust)
- Sea Haunt
- Mish-Mash-Mush (Panting for Gold)
- The Unteachables (The Lawless Years)
- Kink of Swat (Babe Rube)
- One Trillion B.C. (Dinosaur Dope)
- Olimping Champion (Weak-Greek)
- Stuper Man (Muscle-Bounder)
- Buffaloed Bill (Custard's Last Stand)
- Moon Goon (Space Head)
- Robin Hoodwink (Thimple Thief)
- Steamboat Stupe (Captains Outrageous)
- Souse Painter (Brush-Boob)
- Railroad Engineer (Stupefied Jones)
- Quarterback Hack (Pigskinned)
- Drafthead (Overwhere?)
- Lumber-Quack (Topped)
- Jerky Jockey (Kenducky Derby)
- Fired Fireman (Hook And Batter)
- Tuesday Turtle (Private Pie)
- Snafu Safari (Trackdown Tooter)
- Anti-Arctic (North Pole Nuisance)
- Sky Diver (Jump, Jerk, Jump!)
- The Master Builder (Rivet Riot)
- Taxi Turtle (My Flag Is Down)
- Canned Camera (Peek-a-Boob)
- Muddled Mountie (One, Two, Buckle My Snowshoe)
- Duck Haunter (Decoy Drip)
- Bull Fright (Olay Down)
- News Nuisance (Sub Scribe)
- The Sheep of Araby (Beau Geste Goes West)
- Waggin' Train (California Bust)
- Anchors Awry (Nautical Nut)
- Vaudevillain (Song and Dunce Man)
- Rod and Reeling (Field and Scream)
- The Man in The Blue Denim Suit (Hay! Hay!)

== Critical reception and impact ==
Mr. Wizard's phrase "Drizzle, Drazzle, Drozzle, Drome; Time for this one to come home" is echoed in the phrase "Twizzle, Twazzle, Twozzle, Tome, Time for This One to Come on Home" that was used later by the band The Replacements as a lyric in "Hold My Life" from the album Tim.

Created and aired during the Vietnam War, although before the Gulf of Tonkin Incident, the episode featuring Tooter traveling back to World War I as a fighter pilot ("Tailspin Tooter") includes what one historian has called some of "the most gruesome pro-war imagery" in cartoons of the period.

The 1984 novel Bright Lights, Big City includes childhood recollections of the cartoon series by a narrator while in a similar predicament.

In the 1999 film The Matrix, Neo (Keanu Reeves) calls his operator Tank for an exit from the Matrix, saying, "Mr. Wizard, get me the hell out of here!".
