= King Leonardo and His Short Subjects =

American animated television series

- Genre: Animation
- Voices of: Jackson Beck; Delo States; Sandy Becker; George S. Irving; Kenny Delmar; Ben Stone; Allen Swift
- Narrated by: Allen Swift ("The King and Odie" segments); Kenny Delmar ("The Hunter" segments); Sandy Becker ("Tooter Turtle" segments); George S. Irving ("Twinkles the Elephant" segments)
- Country of origin: United States
- Original language: English
- No. of episodes: The King and Odie: 104; The Hunter: 65; Tooter Turtle: 39; (list of episodes)

Production
- Executive producer: Peter M. Piech
- Producers: Joe Harris; Treadwell Covington; W. Watts Biggers; Chet Stover
- Running time: 30 minutes
- Production companies: Total Television; Leonardo Television Productions; TV Spots, Inc. / Creston Studios (seasons 1–2) Gamma Productions (seasons 3-4)

Original release
- Network: NBC
- Release: October 15, 1960 – March 30, 1963
- Network: CBS
- Release: September 28, 1963 – March 21, 1964

King Leonardo and His Short Subjects (also known as The King and Odie Show) is an American Saturday-morning animated television series that aired on NBC from October 15, 1960 to March 30, 1963; the original Short Subjects package last aired on the network on September 28, 1963, when new segments of The King & Odie and The Hunter aired as part of Tennessee Tuxedo and His Tales. The show was initially sponsored by General Mills. It was produced by Total Television Productions and Leonardo Productions, named after the main character, and has been referred to as the second original color Saturday-morning cartoon program after The Ruff and Reddy Show. Leonardo Productions was actually Producers Associates for Television, aka P.A.T.

== Plot ==
The show focuses on Leonardo Lion (voiced by Jackson Beck), the well-meaning but often inept king of the fictional African nation of Bongo Congo which is known for its bongo products. King Leonardo is assisted in all things by a calm, competent skunk named Odie Cologne (a play on Eau de Cologne, but mispronounced as co-low-knee) or "Odie O. Cologne" (voiced by Allen Swift impersonating Ronald Colman). Odie, the one who really keeps the kingdom on an even keel, has been by the king's side since they were children.

King Leonardo's main archenemy is the gangster-type character Biggy Rat (voiced by Jackson Beck impersonating Edward G. Robinson), who routinely attempts to overthrow Leonardo and take over Bongo Congo for himself with Leonardo's dimwitted sibling Itchy Brother (voiced by Allen Swift, as a beatnik) being his puppet king. On occasion, Biggy and Itchy are assisted by an evil German inventor named Professor Messer (voiced by Jackson Beck). Biggy and Itchy's schemes always end up with them either landing in the dungeon or escaping.

Episodes of The King and Odie that were exclusive to Tennessee Tuxedo and His Tales feature Biggy Rat and Itchy Brother employed by Mr. Mad (voiced by Norman Rose), a mad scientist with a domineering personality. Mr. Mad has his own plans for Bongo Congo and indulges in his diabolical studies of behavior where he collected different types of people whilst lacking a King for his studies. Mr. Mad also threatened to throw Biggy and Itchy in "The Room" which contains unseen stuff that frightens both of them should they fail him. When his schemes fail, Mr. Mad disappears "as if by magic" before he can be apprehended.

== Other segments ==
Each half-hour episode of King Leonardo consisted of five animated segments. Each half-hour included a two-part King and Odie episode, with other characters featured in between:

- Tooter Turtle: The adventures of a turtle (voiced by Allen Swift) who has Mr. Wizard the Lizard (voiced by Sandy Becker) transport him to various settings only to realize he was better off at home after all. When Tooter was trapped in a situation he couldn't get out of, he would call to the wizard who sent him home with this incantation: "Drizzle drazzle druzzle drome, time for this one to come home."
- The Hunter: A Southern-accented, crime-fighting bloodhound detective (voiced by Kenny Delmar, reprising his Senator Claghorn voice from The Fred Allen Show) chases after a criminal fox named The Fox (voiced by Ben Stone). The Fox would often commit a scheme which always ends with him being apprehended by The Hunter in the end as The Hunter would be praised by Officer Flim Flanigan (voiced by Ben Stone).

Another segment of the original King Leonardo show was Twinkles, an orange elephant who served as the mascot of Twinkles Cereal, a product of the show's chief sponsor, General Mills. The 90-second Twinkles segments continued to air in syndication during the 1960s, and were presented in a 15-minute format under the title The King and Odie with George S. Irving narrating each segment. It later phased out after a firefighter character replaced the elephant as the cereal's mascot. The segments also appeared during some NBC network rebroadcasts of Underdog. The Twinkles segments were not included when King Leonardo And His Short Subjects was shown in overseas markets lacking that product, or later syndicated in a half-hour format during the 1980s.

For the entirety of the show's run on NBC, selected Columbia Pictures theatrical cartoons were telecast during the program, some featuring The Fox and the Crow and Li'l Abner. The Columbia cartoons were also featured during NBC showings of Hanna-Barbera's The Ruff and Reddy Show, but not included in subsequent syndicated versions of the series.

The animation for the show's early segments was produced by TV Spots, with later episodes by Gamma Productions, the same Mexican studio that did much of the work for Jay Ward Productions. For this reason, and due to shared sponsorship by General Mills, Gamma has often been associated with both Total Television and Jay Ward Productions. TV Spots was primarily a producer of animated commercials, but also was contracted for some segments of Rocky and His Friends for Jay Ward Productions.

== Later appearances ==
After King Leonardo and his Short Subjects ended, one season of new segments of "The King and Odie" and "The Hunter" continued to be produced and aired on Total TV's Tennessee Tuxedo and His Tales from September 1963 to March 1964. The following year, Total TV launched its most popular series, Underdog. When Underdog premiered in 1964, it featured repeats of The Hunter, while The Hunter's former spot on the Tennessee Tuxedo program was filled by repeats of Tooter Turtle.

In reruns, Total Television shorts often have been packaged alongside Jay Ward cartoons. Despite similar limited-animation styles, they were two separate studios. The animation for both studios was done by a small startup company called Gamma Productions; hence, the similar "look."

King Leonardo, despite having its earlier episodes repackaged for syndication as The King and Odie during the mid-1960s, never attained the popularity of Total Television's other series and is rarely seen on television today. Beginning in 2006, the Black Family Channel aired this show on its BFC Kids TV programming block until the channel's demise a year later. The characters of this show were also featured in an eight-issue comic book produced by Dell Comics and Gold Key. Currently, select episodes of The King & Odie, The Hunter, and Tooter Turtle are showcased as part of a 1996 Underdog syndication package distributed by Golden Books, which currently airs on MeTV Toons.

== Cast ==
- Jackson Beck – King Leonardo, Biggy Rat, Professor Messer
- Allen Swift – Odie Cologne, Itchy Brother, Duke, Earl, Tooter Turtle, Narrator ("The King and Odie")
- Sandy Becker – Mr. Wizard
- Kenny Delmar – The Hunter, Narrator ("The Hunter")
- Ben Stone – The Fox, Officer Flim Flanigan, Horace
- Norman Rose – Mr. Mad, Narrator (several 1963-64 episodes of "The King and Odie")
- Delo States – various female and children's voices
- George S. Irving – Narrator ("Twinkles"), various voices
- Mort Marshall
