= Bullwinkle and Rocky Role-Playing Party Game =

1988 cartoon role-playing game

The Bullwinkle and Rocky Role-Playing Party Game is a role-playing game published by TSR in 1988. It is based on characters and settings from The Rocky and Bullwinkle Show.

== Description ==
The Bullwinkle and Rocky Role-Playing Party Game is a humor system based on the cartoon show, featuring Bullwinkle, Rocky, Boris Badenov, Natasha, Dudley Do-Right, Mr. Peabody and Sherman, etc. "How to Play the Game" (16 pages) starts with simple group storytelling, using story cards and predesigned plots, and gradually adds role-playing and character abilities. Action resolution is decided by spinners rather than dice. "Stories (16 pages) provides a number of plots based on the cartoons", while "The Guide to Frostbite Falls and Beyond" (32 pages) describes the world of Rocky and Bullwinkle, the use of the story cards, and characters' special powers. The game includes 10 character hand puppets.

The game can be played three different ways: "The Narration Game", "The Everybody Can Do Something Game", and "The Graduate Game".

== Publication history ==
The Bullwinkle and Rocky Role-Playing Party Game was designed by David Cook and Warren Spector, and published by TSR in 1988 as a boxed set with a 32-page book, two 16-page books, 108 cards (two decks), 20 cardboard stand-ups (19 characters & 1 blank), six spinners, two cardstock sheets, and 10 hand puppets.

== Reception ==
Scott Marley, writing for Games, chose Bullwinkle and Rocky as one of the Best Games of 1988, saying "Hokey Smokes, this is one roleplaying game you've got to have! ... It comes complete with funny rules, useless hand puppets, diplomas from Wassamotta U., and a handy guide to Frostbite Falls."

In Issue 10 of Gateways, Serge Clermont commented, "Because the game revolves around humor, any idea used can be as corny and wacky as the players want them to be, as long as they're funny or extremely bad (as in the case of puns)." Clermont concluded, "for those of you who are diehard Bullwinkle fans, get your batteries charged up to buy and enjoy this great new addition to the role-playing game selection in the market today. You don't have to be experienced as a role-player to have fun with it — and the rules are easy to learn, taking no more than 15 minutes to set up and master."

Matthew Costello, writing for Isaac Asimov's Science Fiction Magazine, noted, "This is a well-designed game, and with the right group could be lots of fun." After an in-depth examination of the game mechanics, Costello concluded, "Well, jeepers, as Rocket J. Squirrel might say, it's one dam peachy game. I could imagine getting a bright group of Bullwinkle fans together, and punning and bad joking the night away . . . with the lucky survivors getting diplomas from Bullwinkle's alma mater Wossa Motta U."

In his 1990 book The Complete Guide to Role-Playing Games, game critic Rick Swan pointed out that "Over the years, game designers have made numerous attempts at child-friendly RPGs, but none have matched the success of Dave Cook's remarkable Bullwinkle and Rocky, a game that's as enjoyable for grade-schoolers as it is for adults." Swan concluded by giving the game a rating of 3 out of 4, saying, "It may be too trivial for serious-minded players, and its lack of formal structure may intimidate those used to games with rigid rules. However, as a painless introduction to role-playing, it's without peer — cleverly designed, beautifully produced and irresistibly fun."

In his 1991 book Heroic Worlds, Lawrence Schick thought that "The introductory-level rules are so loose, the game barely qualifies as an RPG." He commented that the hand puppets "have no bearing on play, but are nice to have".

In his 2023 book Monsters, Aliens, and Holes in the Ground, RPG historian Stu Horvath questioned who TSR designed this game for, noting "Surely, it isn't for children, who in 1988 were being treated to shows like Pee-wee's Playhouse (1986–1990) [and] Teenage Mutant Ninja Turtles (1987–1996) ... Were people who played D&D supposed to turn to this when not everyone in the group could make it?" Despite this, Horvath points out that this game was a groundbreaker: "Collaborative storytelling, falling forward, rotating GMs, and keywords as attributes are now staples of indie and storytelling games that began to emerge in the '90s and came into their own after the turn of the millennium. And that's what's exciting about Bullwinkle and Rocky: It was years ahead of its time, but no one noticed because it was wrapped in the dusty trappings of an old cartoon." "

== Awards ==
The game was a Gamers' Choice award-winner.
