= Moosylvania =

Fictional island

Moosylvania is a fictional island located in the Lake of the Woods along the Canada–United States border that served as a plot device in The Rocky and Bullwinkle Show.

The island has no permanent population, and conditions are said to be harsh and unpleasant. The show's narrator indicates the island has "Zero people, zero growth, zero production, zero space development, zero everything! But, on the other hand, no taxes, no laws, no traffic, no extradition treaties and no late-late shows that feature Johnny Downs and Richard Dix as two men lost over a pacific island".

The island is in a state of terra nullius, since neither Canada nor the United States wants to claim the land and each country says it belongs to the other. (See Bir Tawil for a similar real-life example of this phenomenon.) Bullwinkle J. Moose serves as Moosylvania's presumed namesake and its governor (in addition to 'superintendent, owner and clean-up janitor') but only stays two weeks at a time, since (according to Bullwinkle) "after two weeks here, anyplace else in the world feels like Heaven!"

In the series finale "Moosylvania Saved," Fearless Leader, the head of state of the Eastern European state of Pottsylvania, attempts to destroy Moosylvania. The plot is foiled when Bullwinkle, who was going to go down with his sinking country, asked Rocky for a stick of gum, which inspired Rocky the Flying Squirrel to raise up Moosylvania with helium-filled bubble gum balloons. The plan worked and Moosylvania was saved, giving the series a happy ending.

In the fall of 1962, Jay Ward, producer of the Rocky and Bullwinkle show, decided to campaign for statehood for Moosylvania. Ward sent Skip Craig to Minnesota to buy an island in Lake of the Woods. Craig wasn't able to find one for sale on the U.S. side of the lake (most of the islands in that lake belong to Canada), but managed to lease one for three years. Ward and publicist Howard Brandy conducted a cross-country tour in a decorated van, gathering signatures on a petition for statehood for Moosylvania. While in Washington, D.C., they sought an audience with President John F. Kennedy. However, they arrived at the White House on the very day the Cuban Missile Crisis broke, and were ordered to leave.

A national anthem for Moosylvania was included on the mini-album A Salute to Moosylvania!! Recorded Live at the Moosylvania Jazz Festival, self-released by Jay Ward in 1962.
