= The Adventures of Rocky and Bullwinkle =

The Adventures of Rocky and Bullwinkle may refer to:

== Television and film ==
- The Adventures of Rocky and Bullwinkle and Friends, an American animated television series 1959–1964
- The Adventures of Rocky and Bullwinkle (film), a 2000 American film based on the TV series
- The Adventures of Rocky and Bullwinkle (TV series), a 2018 American animated web television series, a reboot of the original

== Other uses ==
- The Adventures of Rocky and Bullwinkle and Friends (video game), 1992
- The Adventures of Rocky and Bullwinkle Show, a former Universal Studios Florida attraction
- The Adventures of Rocky and Bullwinkle and Friends (pinball), a 1993 pinball game released by Data East USA, Inc.

== See also ==
- Bullwinkle and Rocky Role-Playing Party Game, 1988
- Rocky & Bullwinkle (2014 film), American animated direct-to-video short film
