= Boris and Natasha: The Movie =

1992 film by Charles Martin Smith

- DVD cover
- Genre: Comedy
- Based on: Characters by Jay Ward
- Screenplay by: Charles Fradin; Linda Favila; Anson Downes
- Story by: Charles Fradin; Brad Hall
- Directed by: Charles Martin Smith
- Starring: Dave Thomas; Sally Kellerman; Andrea Martin; Paxton Whitehead; John Travolta
- Narrated by: Corey Burton
- Music by: David Kitay
- Country of origin: United States
- Original language: English

Production
- Executive producer: Sally Kellerman
- Producer: Jonathan D. Krane
- Cinematography: Daryn Okada
- Editors: Maysie Hoy; Patrick Kennedy
- Running time: 88 minutes
- Production companies: Management Company Entertainment Group; Sterling Entertainment Group
- Budget: $1 million or $3-10 million

Original release
- Network: Showtime
- Release: April 17, 1992

Boris and Natasha: The Movie is a 1992 American comedy television film that was loosely based on the characters from the animated television series The Rocky and Bullwinkle Show. Rocky and Bullwinkle are reimagined as two minor human characters with the codenames "Agent Moose" and "Agent Squirrel". This was due to the production company's inability to secure the rights to the animated characters' likenesses for this film. Originally intended for a theatrical release, this film was produced by Management Company Entertainment Group for Showtime Networks, and aired on Showtime on April 17, 1992.

== Plot ==
The movie opens in the tiny country of Pottsylvania, where Fearless Leader concocts a plan to obtain a time-reversal microchip, invented by Professor Anton Paulovitch. He asks his top agent, Agent X, to find the professor, but Agent X suggests they send some patsies instead. Boris Badenov and Natasha Fatale accept the assignment and are told to defect to America. After a number of failed attempts, they arrive in America. The head of the CIA, Sheldon Kaufman, decides to have tests run on them to see if they are truly defecting. After the test, it is obvious to everyone that they should be deported, but a worker, Willie, points out they had not had any defections in a while, and thinks they should play along and spy on them in the meantime to see what they are after.

Boris and Natasha are given an apartment and money, while being secretly watched by Agent X, who himself is being followed by a mysterious figure. The duo have to meet with a secret assassin named Kalishak, who supposedly knows who they should seek, but first have to deal with their next-door neighbors, Toots and Harve, who are very interested in knowing about them. Toots assumes Boris and Natasha are a couple, and when Natasha denies it, Toots figures she is wrong. Natasha, who has become fascinated with America, also learns from Toots that American couples usually help each other, something Boris and Natasha do not.

They find Kalishak, who denies that he knows anything about the professor. After accepting a bribe, Kalishak acts as a shoe-shine boy and tells Boris "Search your sole," which Boris does not understand. After they leave, one of Kalishak's potatoes is replaced with a bomb, killing him. Natasha later sees information written on the sole of Boris' shoe, telling them to find "Minelli". Disguised as rug cleaners, they go to the location on the shoe, where they learn that the "Minelli" they are looking for is Sal Minelli, a photographer. Natasha then gets an offer for a photo shoot and a party, which Boris figures will be a good opportunity to meet Minelli. To pass the time before the party they go shopping at a mall, but the next day Natasha returns, going shopping with Toots, behind Boris' back. She learns that Toots does not need Harve's permission to do things, and learns more about their married life. Boris says a code phrase to many photographers, to no avail, before not being allowed in, but Natasha soon hits celebrity status.

Boris gets annoyed at Natasha for acting like such a celebrity, especially since Fearless Leader had ordered them to keep a low profile. But Natasha remembers what Toots had told her, and points out that she has been responsible for Boris' success before leaving for the party. Boris starts to feel bad about their argument, while at the party Natasha keeps seeing Boris. She leaves the party, and finds Boris sleeping outside.

Minelli calls their home and arranges a photo session with Natasha. It turns out Minelli is a spy, and they are being spied on by Kaufman, Agent X, and the man who had been following Agent X. He informs her that Fearless Leader had sent them as patsies and that they will be killed when they find the professor. Just when he is about to tell her the name of Agent X, Agent X kills Minelli. Boris, disguised as a cop, finds out that Agent X is actually Willie. Boris and Natasha leave their apartment right as an assassination attempt on them occurs. Disguised as overweight Irishmen, they stay at a hotel, where they find Willie dead, and also find that he had an 11:30 train schedule. They leave with Willie, intent on hiding his body, but they encounter Harve and Toots attending a party at the hotel, and convince them Willie has had too many drinks. Boris and Natasha eventually send Willie's body down a laundry chute, only to remember that they had left the train schedule at the hotel room. When they get back, they see Paulovitch, who is revealed to be the one who had been following Agent X. He asks that they discuss the chip, which Boris and Natasha still know nothing about, but Toots and Harve suddenly arrive with Willie's body, which they decided to return him to them. When questioned about being at a hotel when they have an apartment, they claim that they are there for relationship counseling. Once Toots and Harve are gone, they find Paulovitch missing, along with the train schedule.

They chase after Paulovitch, eventually catching a taxi, where they see Paulovitch and question him, who claims he does not know what they are talking about. Boris then discovers lit dynamite in the taxi, and that the driver is actually a dummy. The car explodes, but the explosion reverses. After a few explosions and reverses, they jump out of the taxi. Paulovitch tells them about the time-reversing chip and reveals that that was his first life-and-death experiment with it. He explains that his evil twin brother Kreeger is also after the chip. Boris and Natasha decide to help make sure it does not fall into the wrong hands. However, Paulovitch gets kidnapped, but Boris and Natasha find a penny, which they instantly see as a clue. They go to Mount Rushmore, where they notice a ladder going into Lincoln's nose.

There, they find Paulovitch's secret laboratory. They discover millions of time-reverse microchips, and find Anton tied up. He tells them he was kidnapped by Kreeger, but then they learn that he is in fact Kreeger, while Anton is tied up. They learn that once Anton realized the microchip could be disastrous in the wrong hands, he tried to destroy it, only for its effect to protect it from destruction, so he had them mass-produced with the intention of sending them to every country with the goal of ending wars. Kaufman enters and reveals that he is not actually working for the government, but the auto industry and insurance companies, and knows that the chip could put an end to his business. Harve and Toots then show up with guns, and reveal themselves to be Agents Moose and Squirrel. Fearless Leader shows up and takes over, taking the pile of microchips. After Natasha manages to temporarily disable the power, a fight ensues. Boris takes out a stick of dynamite, which he was "saving for a rainy day", and throws it at the pile of microchips, which sends them back to the very beginning of the movie. Knowing what will happen, Boris realizes that Fearless Leader must know what will happen as well, so Boris decides they will go to Tahiti (a place Natasha had earlier expressed desire to visit) instead. When Paulovitch realizes that he had not been properly introduced to them, Boris introduces Natasha as his girlfriend.

The narrator wonders aloud if they really are safe from the danger they had avoided by going to Tahiti, asking all kinds of questions, before Boris tells him to shut up. The narrator then tells viewers to tune in to their next episode, "'Goodbye Mr. Chip', or 'The Megabytes Back!'"

== Cast ==
- Dave Thomas as Boris Badenov
- Sally Kellerman as Natasha Fatale
- John Calvin as Harve / Agent Moose
- Andrea Martin as Toots / Agent Squirrel
- Paxton Whitehead as Anton / Kreeger Paulovitch
- Christopher Neame as Fearless Leader
- Alex Rocco as Sheldon Kaufman
- John Candy as Kalishak
- José Eber as himself
- Sid Haig as Col. Gorda
- Anthony Newley as Sal Minelli
- Larry Cedar as Agent X / Willie
- John Travolta as Himself
- Amy Brandis as Olga Badenov
- Steve Como as Gerald Fatale
- Rance Howard as Polygraph Man
- Charles Martin Smith as Hotel Clerk
- Corey Burton as Narrator

June Foray, the original voice of Natasha and Rocky from the Rocky and Bullwinkle Show, makes a cameo appearance as a woman who wants Natasha's autograph.

== Production ==
Writer and associate producer Charles Fradin came up with the initial pitch for a Boris and Natasha movie as he was a fan of Jay Ward's work on The Adventures of Rocky and Bullwinkle. After developing the story with Brad Hall, Fradin felt Sally Kellerman had the perfect voice for the role, describing her as a mixture of Marlene Dietrich and Greta Garbo, and took the pitch to producer Jonathan D. Krane who was both Kellerman's husband and Fradin's manager. Kellerman was unfamiliar with Boris and Natasha having only the vaguest of recollections of seeing one or two episodes of the show decades earlier, but as Krane loved the idea Kellerman agreed and the film was formally greenlit. After negotiating with creator Jay Ward for the rights to the characters (who had not creative involvement in the project), the screenplay went through 20 revisions. While Ward allowed the usage of Boris and Natasha, he did not authorize the usage of Rocky and Bullwinkle meaning the writers employed workarounds for the "Moose and Squirrel" Boris and Natasha chase with the characters of Harve and Toots created as replacements. Kellerman was unfazed by the removal of the characters as the intention from the beginning had always been to expand on and humanize Boris and Natasha as characters as the primary focus.

At Kellerman's suggestion, Dave Thomas was cast as Natasha's counterpart Boris. In an interview with Comics Scene magazine, Natasha's original voice actress, June Foray, felt Thomas was not proper casting for Boris and voiced her desire to see Bob Hoskins in the role noting her experience working with him on Who Framed Roger Rabbit and feeling his short stature and gruff demeanor made him perfect for the role. Charles Martin Smith was given the position of director with Thomas' help, and Smith was enthused about the project as his father was an animator and he grew up with fond memories of the Jay Ward produced cartoons. Using his connections as a talent agent, Krane was able to secure John Travolta (for whom Krane had produced starring vehicles Chains of Gold and Look Who's Talking series) and John Candy for cameos in the film. For Kellerman's research into how to play Natasha, she listened to what she described as "Polish mood music", watched a "long-winded" Russian movie where the lead actress only spoke three lines, and viewed approximately 100 episodes of Rocky and his Friends provided by the Museum of Broadcasting in New York City. Kellerman noted how little screen time Boris and Natasha had in the series only appearing long enough to comment on their chase of "Moose and Squirrel". In order to dive deeper into Natasha's character, Kellerman met with Natasha's original voice actress June Foray (who appeared in a bit part in the film) in order to better understand the character. Foray made an audiotape for Kellerman of her speaking in Natasha's voice. When Kellerman asked Foray what Boris and Natasha cared about, Foray responded 1) Getting Moose and Squirrel and 2) Her love of Boris and her feelings that he was the greatest thing on Earth. A mock biography of Natasha Fatale sold at the Dudley Do-Right Emporium in Hollywood was used as a further resource for the character.

The film began shooting in September 1988. Following a test screening where audience reaction to the film was negative with particular confusion at the humor and pacing of the film, the filmmakers spent 18 months trying to re-edit the film to make it work. According to Thomas, a number of scenes were never shot, which made it impossible to properly edit the film. Krane has stated the film was produced on a budget of approximately $1 million while a report in the Chicago Tribune pegged the budget within the range of $3-10 million.

== Release ==
Following the Bankruptcy of production company Management Company Entertainment Group (M.C.E.G.) the film premiered on Showtime four years after the film had been completed. Showtime had a deal with M.C.E.G. to air their films following their theatrical runs. After M.C.E.G. reorganized following their bankruptcy, Boris and Natasha: The Movie along with other M.C.E.G. productions Fatal Charm and Chains of Gold aired directly on Showtime and skipping a theatrical release altogether. In July 1989, Boris and Natasha: The Movie was planned for a release in the Fall of that year to celebrate the 30th anniversary of Rocky and his Friends (later The Bullwinkle Show, later known in reruns as The Rocky and Bullwinkle Show or The Adventures of Rocky and Bullwinkle, with Walt Disney Home Video having secured to the original series episodes for release on VHS. This original planned release date was abandoned due to financial difficulties within M.C.E.G. A March 1990 release also went unmet.

Boris and Natasha: The Movie premiered on Showtime on April 17, 1992. A home video release followed on December 2, 1992.

=== Home media ===
The film was released on VHS in December 1992 by Academy Entertainment and on DVD from Platinum Disc in 1999. The DVD contained no bonus material. MGM later re-released it on DVD on June 26, 2012, as part of their "Limited Edition Collection".
