= Chew Chew Baby (disambiguation) =

Chew Chew Baby is a 1958 Noveltoon. "Chew Chew Baby" may also refer to

- Chew-Chew Baby, a 1945 Woody Woodpecker cartoon
- "Chew Chew Baby or Stick to Your Gums", a segment of an episode of The Rocky and Bullwinkle Show
