= Natasha Fatale =

Antagonist of The Rocky and Bullwinkle Show

- Rocky and Bullwinkle character
- Created by: Jay Ward, Alex Anderson and Bill Scott
- Portrayed by: Sally Kellerman (1992 film); Rene Russo (2000 film)
- Voiced by: June Foray (1959–2008); Lauri Fraser (2014); Rachel Butera (2018–2019)

In-universe information
- Gender: Female
- Occupation: Spy; Criminal
- Affiliation: Boris Badenov; Mr. Big; Fearless Leader
- Significant other: Boris Badenov

Natasha Fatale is an antagonist in the 1959–1964 animated cartoons Rocky and His Friends and The Bullwinkle Show, collectively referred to as The Rocky and Bullwinkle Show. She was voiced by June Foray (impersonating Zsa Zsa Gabor) who also voiced Rocky.

== Role in the series ==
Natasha is a spy for the fictional country of Pottsylvania, and takes orders from Fearless Leader. Natasha usually serves as an accomplice to fellow spy Boris Badenov. Like Boris, she is also a master of disguise.

== Fictional biography ==
According to the Rialto Theater's Moosebill for "Downhill: The Musical" (a special table of contents insert created for the DVD box set Rocky and Bullwinkle & Friends, The Third Season), Natasha is supposedly the only child of Axis Sally and Count Dracula. A former Miss Transylvania, she was expelled from college for subversive activities at a local cemetery. She traveled from Transylvania to the United States at the age of 19, landing in New York, where she spent two years posing for cartoonist Charles Addams, and as the party girl who pops out of the big cake at embalmers' stag parties. (Much as Boris was loosely based on Gomez Addams, Natasha's appearance was based on that of Morticia Addams, who had not yet been named at the time Rocky and His Friends was airing.)

She met Boris Badenov when they were arrested for throwing rocks at Girl Scouts. He became smitten with her charms and they became partners in crime. Usually, Natasha's and Boris's misdeeds are thwarted by Rocky the Flying Squirrel and Bullwinkle the Moose. She refers to them collectively as "moose and squirrel". She is almost always shown in a purple dress, but in the last season it is often red.

== Status as a femme fatale ==
Natasha's last name is a pun on the phrase femme fatale, with emphasis on the "fatal" part; in keeping with that, Natasha was drawn as a shapely, attractive-looking woman. However, in nearly all episodes, the character is identified only as Natasha, with no surname. She is apocryphally known as "Natasha Nogoodnik". However, she is identified in the series premiere by her proper name by the show's narrator, making "Fatale" her canonical and correct surname (in Jet Fuel Formula her last name is pronounced "Fuh-TAH-lee", although in the second story arc it is pronounced "Fuh-TAHL"). However, either or both may be a nom de guerre.

== Appearances in live-action films ==
In the 1992, Showtimes Network film Boris and Natasha: The Movie, the live-action Natasha was portrayed by Sally Kellerman. In the 2000 theatrical film The Adventures of Rocky and Bullwinkle, the live-action Natasha was portrayed by Rene Russo. In the 2014, 3D DreamWorks Animation short film Rocky & Bullwinkle, Lauri Fraser provided the voice for Natasha. Natasha's original voice actor, June Foray, reprised her role as Rocky but not as Natasha. In the 2018 Amazon Video series The Adventures of Rocky and Bullwinkle, she is voiced by Rachel Butera.
