= Boris Badenov =

Antagonist of The Rocky and Bullwinkle Show

- Rocky and Bullwinkle character
- Created by: Jay Ward; Bill Scott
- Portrayed by: Dave Thomas (1992 film); Jason Alexander (2000 film)
- Voiced by: Paul Frees (1959–1986); Frank Welker (Bullwinkle's Restaurant); Joe Alaskey (1987–1993); Keith Scott (1993–2008); Fred Frees (Cartoon Network commercial); Dan Milano/Mark Hamill (Robot Chicken); Robert Cait (2014 short); Benjamin Diskin (2018–2019)

In-universe information
- Species: Human
- Gender: Male
- Occupation: Spy; Criminal
- Significant other: Natasha Fatale
- Nationality: Pottsylvanian

Boris Badenov is an antagonist character in the 1959–1964 animated series Rocky and His Friends and The Bullwinkle Show, so often appearing with his devious accomplice, Natasha Fatale, that the two are usually grouped together, as Boris and Natasha, a reference to Boris Drubetskoy and Natasha Rostova in Tolstoy’s War and Peace. He was originally voiced by Paul Frees. The character was created by Jay Ward and Bill Scott, who based his appearance on that of Gomez Addams.

Badenov's name is a pun on that of 16th-century Russian tsar Boris Godunov (i.e., "good enough" vs. "bad enough"). His accent and explosive temper are a homage to Hollywood actor Akim Tamiroff, especially his role in The Great McGinty.

== Character background ==
Boris is a spy from the fictional nation of Pottsylvania, and takes orders from the strongman known as Fearless Leader (and occasionally the rarely seen Mr. Big). Boris's missions range from trying to steal a secret rocket fuel formula to eliminating all television from the United States as part of Pottsylvania's various attempts to seize power. Boris, who is thoroughly dedicated to (and takes delight in) all manners of nefarious deeds, also sometimes engages in his own schemes, such as starting his own organized crime gang and hiring himself out as a professional executioner, and frequently conspires schemes simply to get rich (such as by posing as a Hollywood director to bilk Bullwinkle out of his life savings in "The Last Angry Moose" or usurping Santa Claus by taking advantage of a freak polar drift in "Topsy Turvy World"). Separately from the television series, a commercial for the Rocky and Bullwinkle Show featuring Boris established that he was an active member of Local 12 of the Villains, Thieves, and Scoundrels Union. During this commercial, Boris also claims to be "the world's greatest nogoodnik". Boris is also quite proud that the nicest thing Fearless Leader ever did for him was sending a picture of himself to Boris inscribed "Drop Dead — Fearless Leader". He is a master of disguise and aliases.

According to the Rialto Theater's "Moosebill" for "Downhill: The Musical" (a special table of contents insert created for the DVD box set Rocky and Bullwinkle & Friends, The Third Season), Boris was educated in the Pottsylvania public schools before taking a scoundrelship to U.S.C. (the University of Safe Cracking), from which he graduated magna cum louse. He has a strong stomach and because of it was one of only three survivors of the ruling clique of Pottsylvania, the other two being his superiors Fearless Leader and Mister Big. Boris enjoys light reading; his favorite book is an anthology of fiendish plans called the Fireside Crook Book. He is also a charter member of the Van Gogh Society, a Pottsylvanian club whose members collect human ears.

Early in the series, Boris begins as much more of a traditional villain, even a menacing presence; in the earliest episodes he was taller, had red eyes and a more demonic appearance. After the first episodes, he changed to his normal short stature, but still retained the red eyes until a few episodes afterwards; by the fourth episode, he has developed into a more comic character and dons his first disguise—a swami intent on hypnotizing Bullwinkle. Humorously, they changed from red to white after he had woken up from a long slumber, as if the redness was caused by sleep deprivation.

Boris is nearly always accompanied by his fellow spy, Natasha Fatale, an iconic femme fatale with an icy smile who wears a slit dress. The first time he appeared without her was in the story arc "Buried Treasure". The first story arc in which neither appeared was "The Three Moosketeers".

Usually, Boris' misdeeds are thwarted by Rocky the Flying Squirrel and Bullwinkle the Moose. Boris's attempts at killing "moose and squirrel" (as he refers to them) also always end in failure, usually by his own scheme backfiring on him. "Of course, I've got plan!" he says. "I've always got plan! They don't ever work, but I've always got one!" As Boris expresses his plight in one promo: "I send in lady spy with package which is really bomb. Door gets locked, she can't get out, who gets blown up? Me!"

Boris appeared in all but three Rocky and Bullwinkle storylines: The Three Moosketeers, The Ruby Yacht, and Mucho Loma. Boris often appeared in segments of Bullwinkle's Corner, Mr. Know-It-All, and The Rocky and Bullwinkle Fan Club.

== Catchphrases ==
Boris's main catch phrase (spoken when frustrated) is "Raskolnikov!" (a reference to the novel Crime and Punishment by Dostoevsky), spoken in his Pottsylvanian accent (a mock-Russian accent).

Boris would also say, "Sharrup you mouth!" to Natasha when his schemes failed. However, in the final segment of "Greenpernt Oogle", when he and Natasha were stuck in their own mine field, he says to her, "Natasha, next time I get fiendish plan, do me big favor? Sharrup my mouth!" She does indeed do this in one episode, saying those very words to Boris as the car they were in dropped over a cliff to the ground in the 8-segment story arc "The Treasure of Monte Zoom". Also, whenever his superior gives him an order, he utters the line "You sair it!"

Boris would usually greet a new acquaintance by saying, "Allow me to introducing myself. I am Boris Badenov, world's greatest no-goodnik".

== In other media ==
- In the 1992 Showtime Network film Boris and Natasha: The Movie, the live-action Boris was played by Dave Thomas.
- In the 2000 theatrical film The Adventures of Rocky and Bullwinkle, the live-action Boris was played by Jason Alexander.
- Boris reappears in the 2014 3D DreamWorks Animation short film Rocky & Bullwinkle, voiced by Robert Cait.
- Boris appears in the 2018 Amazon Video series The Adventures of Rocky and Bullwinkle, where he is voiced by Benjamin Diskin. This incarnation, while still mean and selfish, is also ditzy, easily distracted and somewhat childlike, almost an evil version of Bullwinkle. Instead of usurping Santa, he shows great admiration for him. ("I talk about Santa all I want. He's very magical man.") He's also a surprisingly gifted keytar player, although it appears his mother didn't approve of the instrument. He was sent to spy school because his mother had hoped for him to be Pottsylvania's next top model, but as time went on she realized that wasn't possible.
- Boris has appeared in two Robot Chicken sketches.
