= Rocky the Flying Squirrel =

American animated character

- Rocky and His Friends character
- First appearance: Rocky and His Friends (1959)
- Created by: Alex Anderson; Jay Ward
- Voiced by: June Foray (1959–2014); Lauri Fraser (2014; GEICO commercial); Tara Strong (2018–2019)
- Portrayed by: Andrea Martin (1992 film)

In-universe information
- Species: Flying squirrel
- Gender: Male
- Nationality: American

Rocket "Rocky" J. Squirrel, also known as Rocky the Flying Squirrel, is one of the two protagonists of the 1959–1964 animated series Rocky and His Friends and The Bullwinkle Show (both shows often referred to collectively as The Rocky and Bullwinkle Show), produced by Jay Ward. Rocky is the best friend and ally of the western moose, Bullwinkle. Both Rocky and Bullwinkle were given the middle initial "J" as a reference to Ward.

== Creation ==
Jay Ward and partner Alex Anderson originally created Rocky as part of The Frostbite Falls Review, a proposed pilot that was not developed. The character was later used as the star of the series Rocky and His Friends. However, when the show changed networks from ABC to NBC, its name was changed to The Bullwinkle Show, with Bullwinkle replacing Rocky as the lead role due to the moose having larger popularity than Rocky.

== Biography ==
Rocky shared a house with Bullwinkle, in the fictional small town of Frostbite Falls, Minnesota, a parody of the real-life American town of International Falls, Minnesota. Rocky and Bullwinkle would often have various adventures that usually saw them thwart the various schemes of the series' villains, Boris Badenov and Natasha Fatale (and also occasionally Boris and Natasha's superior, Fearless Leader).

Rocky's most frequently used catchphrase was "Hokey smoke!"

== Personality ==
Rocky's personality was meant to be that of an upstanding and subdued, if often slightly naive, all-American youth; a "plucky squirrel" far more intelligent than his partner. As the brains and straight man of the "moose and squirrel" duo, Rocky often was shown as coming up with creative solutions to the various situations the duo found themselves in on their adventures. However, he is no less gullible toward Boris Badenov's and Natasha Fatale's disguises than Bullwinkle. The best he can do is to occasionally remark, "Those two look familiar!" or "That voice, where have I heard it before?"

== Powers and abilities ==
Rocky often made extensive use of his ability to fly, which was presented with, appropriate to his full name, a jet engine sound effect. The original opening title of Rocky and His Friends introduces Rocky as "that Jet Age aerial ace", complete with Rocky performing a solo air show for a crowd of spectators. His airborne abilities have been depicted inconsistently; some episodes, such as the first season's "Jet Fuel Formula" storyline, presented this ability as limited to gliding (similar to the abilities of a real flying squirrel). Other episodes presented Rocky's flight abilities as similar to those of Superman (hovering in mid-air, ascending in altitude, carrying objects, etc.); one example is Rocky flying from Minnesota to Washington, D.C. under his own power in the second season's "Greenpernt Oogle" storyline.

Occasionally, Rocky would rely on Bullwinkle's strength (via an acrobatic maneuver) to provide him with an extra boost in flight speed, as shown in his attempt to reach the hovering Mount Flatten in the second season's "Upsidaisium" storyline.

According to the series, Rocky learned his aerial skills at the Cedar Yorpantz Flying School (a play on the idiomatic expression "seat of your pants").

== Voice ==
Voice actress June Foray was the voice of Rocky, as well as the voice of Natasha Fatale, Nell Fenwick and other female characters. Foray continued to voice the character in modern media depictions of Rocky and Bullwinkle including the 2000 film until her retirement in 2014. In the 1992 film Boris and Natasha: The Movie, Andrea Martin portrays Rocky as the human woman "Agent Squirrel".

Rocky returns in the 2018 Amazon Video series The Adventures of Rocky and Bullwinkle, where Tara Strong took over as the voice of Rocky.

== Other appearances ==
The Rocky character made an appearance in Gary Larson's The Far Side comic strip, causing Larson to comment, "I've discovered an interesting phenomenon. Once you've drawn Rocky the Flying Squirrel, you can never draw him again. In the final version, I must have drawn and erased that miserable little rodent fifty times, and he ultimately ended up looking like Rocky the Flying Hamster."

In 2014, Rocky and Bullwinkle appeared in a GEICO television commercial where the GEICO Gecko is looking at the Rocky Mountains with them, and trying to explain what they were named after.

During a broadcast of an Atlanta Braves baseball game in the late 1990s, a real squirrel scampered onto the field and caused a delay in play. During the delay, the squirrel was featured on camera with a superimposed graphic identifying him as "Rocket J. Squirrel". His position was listed as "Shortstop".

=== Comics ===
- Rocky and his Friends (1960) (Dell)
- Bullwinkle (1962) (Gold Key)
- Rocky and His Fiendish Friends (1962) (Gold Key)
- Bullwinkle Mother Moose Nursery Pomes (1962) (Dell)
- Bullwinkle and Rocky (1970) (Charlton)
- Bullwinkle and Rocky (1987) (Star Comics)
- Bullwinkle and Rocky Marvel Moosterworks (1992) (Marvel)
- Rocky and Bullwinkle (2014) (IDW)

=== Video games ===
- The Adventures of Rocky and Bullwinkle and Friends (1992)
- Rocky and Bullwinkle (2008)
