= The Adventures of Rocky and Bullwinkle (TV series) =

2018 animated television series

- Promotional poster
- Genre: Comedy; Slapstick; Action-adventure; Animated sitcom
- Based on: The Adventures of Rocky and Bullwinkle and Friends by Jay Ward
- Developed by: Marco Schnabel; David P. Smith
- Showrunner: Scott Fellows
- Voices of: Tara Strong; Brad Norman; Ben Diskin; Rachel Butera; Piotr Michael
- Narrated by: Daran Norris
- Theme music composer: The Outfit (The Stink of Fear); Jeremy Warmsley (Dark Side of the Moose); Guy Moon
- Composer: Guy Moon
- Country of origin: United States
- Original language: English
- No. of seasons: 1 (2 parts)
- No. of episodes: 26

Production
- Executive producers: Scott Fellows; Tiffany Ward
- Running time: 23 minutes
- Production companies: Jay Ward Productions; DreamWorks Animation Television

Original release
- Network: Amazon Prime Video
- Release: May 11, 2018 – January 11, 2019

Related
- The Mr. Peabody & Sherman Show

The Adventures of Rocky and Bullwinkle is an American animated sitcom produced by DreamWorks Animation Television which is a reboot of the 1959–64 animated television series of the same name. It debuted on May 11, 2018, on Amazon Prime Video, being DreamWorks Animation Television's first series to air on a streaming service other than Netflix. Like its preceding spin-off The Mr. Peabody & Sherman Show, animation was outsourced by DHX Media's 2D animation studio in Vancouver, British Columbia, Canada. The second and final "part" of the series was released on January 11, 2019.

== Premise ==
The series sees Rocky and Bullwinkle "thrust into harrowing situations but end up saving the day time and again". As Rocky and Bullwinkle's innocent and silly ambitions to become rock stars or find lost treasure end up dovetailing with Fearless Leader's sinister plans to take over the world, our heroes are set on a collision course with his notorious superspies Boris Badenov and Natasha Fatale.

== Cast and characters ==
=== Main ===
- Tara Strong as Rocket "Rocky" J. Squirrel
- Brad Norman as Bullwinkle J. Moose
- Ben Diskin as Boris Badenov
- Rachel Butera as Natasha Fatale, Cloyd
- Piotr Michael as Fearless Leader
- Daran Norris as Narrator, Evil Chicken

=== Recurring ===
- Fuschia! as Director Peachfuzz
- Ant Simpson as Butler
- Kari Wahlgren as Grandwinkle
- Rhomeyn Johnson as Rafi Tusk
- Tom Kenny as Colonel Boudreaux
- Kevin Michael Richardson as President Leader
- Grey Griffin as Dr. Lesso
- Faruq Tauheed as Mayor Grundstrom
- Ben Giroux as Francis / Newsie
- Eric Bauza as Premier Leader

=== Guest ===
- Lil Rel Howery as Chuckles ("If You Can't Beat 'em, Totem!" or "It's Raining Gems!")
- Cristina Milizia as Thalia ("If You Can't Beat 'em, Totem!" or "It's Raining Gems!")
- Roger Craig Smith as Agent Chad ("See You Laser, Alligaser" or "Goop! There it is")

=== Playing themselves ===
- Gordon Ramsay
- Mario Lopez
- "Weird Al" Yankovic
- Mark Hamill

== Episodes ==
Series overview
| Part | Episodes | Originally released |
|---|---|---|
| 1 | 13 | May 11, 2018 |
| 2 | 13 | January 11, 2019 |

=== Part 1 (2018) ===
| No. overall | No. in season | Title | Directed by | Written by | Storyboarded by | Original release date |
|---|---|---|---|---|---|---|
Part 1
| 1 | 1 | "Stink of Fear" | Howie Perry | Story by : Marco Schnabel; Teleplay by : Mike Leffingwell | Chad Coyle, Dennis Messner, Howie Perry, and David P. Smith | May 11, 2018 |
Bullwinkle enters the annual Frostbite Falls Pie Contest using his Grandwinkle's secret stinky pie recipe and wins the chance to compete at "Le Grand Yum Yum", a prestigious cooking competition in Paris. When they arrive, Rocky and Bullwinkle run afoul of Boris and Natasha, a pair of spies from Pottsylvania who have been sent by their boss Fearless Leader to steal the secret recipe so he can use it to create a biological weapon to take over the world. Rocky and Bullwinkle's antics also grab the attention of Director Peachfuzz who orders her secret agents to keep an eye on the duo.
| 2 | 2 | "The Pie's the Limit!" "Our Moose is Cooked" | Greg Miller | Story by : Marco Schnabel; Teleplay by : John T. Reynolds | Jon Magram and Mike Stern | May 11, 2018 |
On the first day of the competition, Bullwinkle tries to help Rocky overcome his crippling stage fright and Boris and Natasha successfully obtain the secret recipe using an x-ray camera. After narrowly making it into the finals, Bullwinkle realizes he forgot to pack the pie's secret ingredient and arranges to meet his Grandwinkle in Norway to retrieve some.
| 3 | 3 | "I Did It Norway" "Live and Let Pie" | Chuck Sheetz | Story by : Marco Schnabel; Teleplay by : Benjamin Siemon | Zeus Cervas, Chad Coyle, and Luc Latulippe | May 11, 2018 |
In Norway, Rocky, Bullwinkle and Grandwinkle take to the seas to retrieve the secret ingredient they need, lutefisk. However, once on the waters it becomes apparent that Grandwinkle has ulterior motives when she starts hunting a giant lutefisk known as the Whalefisk.
| 4 | 4 | "Pour Some Lutefisk on Me" "The Pie-nal Countdown" | Chuck Sheetz | Story by : Marco Schnabel; Teleplay by : Christopher Godfrey | Chad Coyle and Gregory Leysens | May 11, 2018 |
After learning from Director Peachfuzz that his family's pie is going to be used for evil, Bullwinkle and Rocky head to Fearless Leader's lair in Pottsylvania to put an end to his plans. Meanwhile, tired of their incompetence, Fearless Leader fires Boris and Natasha and replaces them with a homemade robot.
| 5 | 5 | "Prague Day Afternoon" "Hypno-Pie-zed" | Greg Miller | Story by : Marco Schnabel; Teleplay by : John T. Reynolds and Benjamin Siemon | Jon Magram and Mike Stern | May 11, 2018 |
Director Peachfuzz and her new faithful sidekick Rocky race to the Le Grand Yum Yum Finale in Prague to stop a brainwashed Bullwinkle from using his pie to stinkify the World Leaders.
| 6 | 6 | "The Dark Side of the Moose" | Howie Perry | Story by : Marco Schnabel; Teleplay by : Nathan Knetchel and Keith Wagner | Melody Iza and Dennis Messner | May 11, 2018 |
Looking for an exciting story to tell at the big Wossamotta U reunion, Rocky and Bullwinkle decide to attend eccentric billionaire Rafi Tusk's space camp. Fearless Leader sends Boris and Natasha to the same camp where they are tasked with stealing Tusk's state of the art super satellite. At camp, Rocky and Bullwinkle accidentally take off in a real rocket and land in the middle of Nevada where they encounter an alien with strange powers.
| 7 | 7 | "Mooseton, We Have a Problem" "In Space, No One Can Hear You Squirrel!" | Chuck Sheetz | Story by : Marco Schnabel; Teleplay by : Mike Leffingwell and Benjamin Siemon | Chad Coyle and Gregory Leysens | May 11, 2018 |
Rocky and Bullwinkle decide to help the little alien, whom they dub "Cloyd", reunite with his missing parents unaware that they are being tracked by eccentric billionaire Colonel Boudreaux who wants Cloyd as an attraction for his alien zoo. Boris and Natasha learn of Cloyd's alien powers and decide to capture him for Fearless Leader. In the end, Cloyd is kidnapped by Boris and Natasha but not before he transfers his powers to Rocky.
| 8 | 8 | "U.F.-Oh No!" "Squirrel, Interrupted" | Greg Miller | Scott Fellows | Jon Magram and Mike Stern | May 11, 2018 |
Rocky tries to master his fantastic new abilities as he and Bullwinkle search for a way to get to Pottsylvania to save Cloyd. Boris and Natasha try to show off Cloyd's now vanished alien powers to Fearless Leader.
| 9 | 9 | "Squirreled Domination" "Bullwinkle's Space Station Vacation" | Howie Perry | Nathan Knetchel and Keith Wagner | Melody Iza and Dennis Messner | May 11, 2018 |
With a little help from Cloyd's parents, Bullwinkle and Cloyd head into space to stop Fearless Leader from using Rocky's powers to take over the world.
| 10 | 10 | "Moosebumps!" | Chuck Sheetz | Mike Leffingwell and Benjamin Siemon | Monica Davila and Gregory Leysens | May 11, 2018 |
Inspired by their favorite internet celebrities, the Monster Bros, Rocky and Bullwinkle buy an old spooky house in England with the intent to hunt monsters. Boris and Natasha try to scare the duo out of the house so that they can buy it for Fearless Leader to use as a summer home.
| 11 | 11 | "The Moose on Haunted Hill" "The Creature from Frostbite Falls" | Greg Miller | Nathan Knetchel and Keith Wagner | Jon Magram and Mike Stern | May 11, 2018 |
After drinking a mysterious potion, Bullwinkle turns into a monster. Rocky tries to convince the people of London that Bullwinkle means them no harm so that they can safely return home but they are instead hunted by the Monster Bros as well as Boris and Natasha after Fearless Leader decides to take over the world with a monster army.
| 12 | 12 | "A Pain in the Butler" "The Island of Dr. Moose-reau" | Howie Perry | Mike Leffingwell and Benjamin Siemon | Melody Iza and Dennis Messner | May 11, 2018 |
Rocky decides to take Bullwinkle to Weird Monster Island so he can find someone that can cure the moose of his condition. There they meet mad scientist Dr. Lesso who cures Bullwinkle in exchange for helping her pacify her largest, most aggressive creation, Humongalon. Fearless Leader sends Boris and Natasha to the island as well to collect a monster army but instead they end up seizing control of Humongalon.
| 13 | 13 | "Back in the Monster Saddle Again" "Attack of the 50ft. Moose!" | Chuck Sheetz | Scott Fellows | Monica Davila and Gregory Leysens | May 11, 2018 |
Fearless Leader uses Humongalon to lay siege to London, ordering the World Leaders to relinquish control of their countries to him to stop the rampage. Rocky and Bullwinkle are forced to become fifty foot tall beasts themselves to combat Fearless Leader and save the world.

=== Part 2 (2019) ===
| No. overall | No. in season | Title | Directed by | Written by | Storyboarded by | Original release date |
|---|---|---|---|---|---|---|
Part 2
| 14 | 1 | "Almost Famoose" | Greg Miller | Nathan Knetchel and Keith Wagner | Jon Magram and Mike Stern | January 11, 2019 |
When Rocky and Bullwinkle damage the largest birdbath in the world, they set out on a musical adventure. Meanwhile, Fearless Leader attempts to become a musical superstar so he can amass a legion of devoted superfans who will obey his every command.
| 15 | 2 | "Rocky & Bullwinkle's Magical Moostery Tour" "Bird Bath & Beyond" | Howie Perry | Mike Leffingwell and Benjamin Siemon | Melody Iza and Dennis Messner | January 11, 2019 |
After a video of Rocky and Bullwinkle playing a song goes viral and they're rocketed to musical superstardom, they decide to use their newfound celebrity fame to launch a "save the birdbath" concert tour to restore the giant birdbath they destroyed. Unbeknownst to them, Fearless Leader has Boris and Natasha infiltrate Rocky and Bullwinkle's band and trick them into using song lyrics written by Fearless Leader to make their fans do whatever he say for him.
| 16 | 3 | "Dirty Birdy is the Wordy" "Diary of a Blimpy Kid" | Chuck Sheetz | Nathan Knetchel and Keith Wagner | Monica Davila and Gregory Leysens | January 11, 2019 |
Rocky, Bullwinkle, Boris and Natasha are kidnapped by a superfan named Francis, the 8-year-old heir to the Puffy Platypus Pizza franchise, to play a private concert for his birthday. Meanwhile, after discovering that dirty birds are deceptible to becoming evil, Fearless Leader decides to head to Frostbite Falls to make a Dirty Bird Army to take over the world.
| 17 | 4 | "Bird World Leader" "Bwak Bwak Tweet Bwak 3: The Squawk-ening" | Greg Miller | Scott Fellows | Megan Ruiz G. and Mike Stern | January 11, 2019 |
Rocky and Bullwinkle return to Frostbite Falls to discover that because they failed to rebuild the giant birdbath, their beloved town is now completely overrun with dirty, zombielike birds led by Fearless Leader and Evil Chicken.
| 18 | 5 | "The Legends of the Power Gems" | Howie Perry | Mike Leffingwell and Benjamin Siemon | Robert Iza and Dennis Messner | January 11, 2019 |
While celebrating their "friendiversary" at their favorite restaurant, Long Tom Lobster's, Rocky and Bullwinkle solve a seemingly impossible maze on the kids' menu which lands them into a quest to find a mystical blue Power Gem for the CEO of Long Tom Lobster’s; Mr. Suitman, with the promise of free Shrimp for life. Meanwhile, Fearless Leader decides to enter the restaurant business in a plot to take over the world legally and has Boris and Natasha infiltrate Long Tom Lobster HQ to steal their fast food secrets.
| 19 | 6 | "Put Another Shrimp on the Rocky" "M is for Mistery, Argh is for Pirate" | Chuck Sheetz | Nathan Knetchel and Keith Wagner | Monica Davila and Gregory Leysens | January 11, 2019 |
On a quest to find the Power Gem of fire by the ghost of Long Tom Lobster, Rocky and Bullwinkle travel to Hawaii and enter a surf contest to get the gem back.
| 20 | 7 | "If You Can't Beat 'Em, Totem!" "It's Raining Gems!" | Greg Miller | Mike Leffingwell and Benjamin Siemon | Megan Ruiz G. and Mike Stern | January 11, 2019 |
Rocky and Bullwinkle battle one more guardian to get the final Power Gem -- the wind gem. But once acquired, they take a detour to Squirrel-Dorado where Rocky has been prophesied to be its Champion Savior.
| 21 | 8 | "Gem-me Shelter" "You Are the Wind Guardian Beneath My Gems" | Howie Perry | Scott Fellows | Melody Iza and Dennis Messner | January 11, 2019 |
With all three elemental Power Gems in hand, Fearless Leader sets out to take over the world, but Rocky and Bullwinkle set out to save the world.
| 22 | 9 | "Amazamoose and Squirrel Wonder" | Chuck Sheetz | Nathan Knetchel and Keith Wagner | Monica Davila and Gregory Leysens | January 11, 2019 |
Rocky and Bullwinkle create superhero alter egos Amazamoose and Squirrel Wonder, and they set out on an adventure to save Frostbite Frannie -- and summer vacation.
| 23 | 10 | "See You Laser, Alligaser" "Goop! There It Is" | Greg Miller | Mike Leffinwell and Benjamin Siemon | Megan Ruiz G. and Mike Stern | January 11, 2019 |
When a mysterious goop gives Fearless Leader real-life superpowers, Rocky and Bullwinkle must reprise their masked hero personas to take on superpowered "Fearless Laser" and stop him from lasering his face on the moon.
| 24 | 11 | "Goops!... I Did It Again" "Full Court Stress" | Howie Perry | Scott Fellows | Melody Iza and Dennis Messner | January 11, 2019 |
The mystery goop strikes again when Rocky's stress ball falls into a vat of goop, making it sentient and gigantic, and he and Bullwinkle use the goop to give superpowers to themselves to try and stop the ball.
| 25 | 12 | "Villains Be Illin'" "Waiter, There's a Fly in my Goop." | Chuck Sheetz | Mike Leffinwell and Benjamin Siemon | Monica Davila and Gregory Leysens | January 11, 2019 |
In an attempt to reverse Fearless Leader's goop-induced evil powers, Rocky and Bullwinkle travel to an alternate reality to get an "anti-goop."
| 26 | 13 | "I Want a New Hug" "Goop! There It Is 2: Electric Goopaloo" | Greg Miller | Nathan Knetchel and Keith Wagner | Megan Ruiz Q. and Mike Stern | January 11, 2019 |
Rocky and Bullwinkle set out to take away Fearless Leader's superpowers and save the world.

== Production ==
=== Development ===
On December 10, 2017, it was reported that DreamWorks Animation Television was developing a revival of Jay Ward's The Adventures of Rocky and Bullwinkle and Friends. Animation was expected to be handled by DHX Studios Vancouver with writing and early production duties taking place in Los Angeles.

On April 12, 2018, it was announced that Amazon Prime Video had given a series order to the production and that the show would premiere on May 11, 2018. Executive producers were reported to include Scott Fellows and Tiffany Ward, daughter of the original series producer Jay Ward. On December 15, 2018, it was reported that the series would return with the second half of season one in January 2019. On January 3, 2019, it was announced that these episodes would be released on January 11, 2019.

=== Casting ===
Alongside the series' announcement, it was confirmed that the voice cast would include Tara Strong, Brad Norman, Ben Diskin, Rachel Butera, Piotr Michael, and Daran Norris. Strong takes over the role of Rocky from the late June Foray; this series is the first instance where Rocky is voiced by somebody other than Foray (besides GEICO commercial, where he is voiced by Lauri Fraser) due to her death in 2017.

== Release ==
Alongside the series' announcement, the first official trailer was released. On April 27, 2018, four clips from the series were released.

== Awards and nominations ==
| Year | Award | Category | Nominee(s) | Result | Ref. |
|---|---|---|---|---|---|
| 2019 | Annie Awards | Character Design in an Animated Television / Broadcast Production | Chris Mitchell (for "The Stink of Fear: Chapter One" – Characters: Rocky, Bullwinkle, Fearless Leader, Boris, Natasha, Director Peachfuzz) | Nominated | |
| 2019 | Annie Awards | Character Design in an Animated Television / Broadcast Production | Keiko Murayama (for "The Stink of Fear: Chapter One" – Characters: Baby Natasha, Baby Boris, Grandwinkle, Mayor Grundstrom, Boris’ Gang, Gang) | Nominated | |
| 2019 | Annie Awards | Production Design in an Animated Television / Broadcast Production | Chris Mitchell, Chris Turnham, Tor Anut, DanBob Thompson, and Aaron Spurgeon (for "The Stink of Fear: Chapter One") | Nominated | |
| 2019 | Kidscreen Awards | Kids Programming – Best New Series | The Adventures of Rocky and Bullwinkle | Won | |
| 2019 | Daytime Emmy Awards | Outstanding Directing for an Animated Program | Greg Miller, Howie Perry, Kristi Reed and Chuck Sheetz | Nominated | |
| 2019 | Daytime Emmy Awards | Outstanding Main Title and Graphic Design for an Animated Program | | Nominated | |
| 2020 | Annie Awards | Character Design in an Animated Television / Broadcast Production | Chris Mitchell (for "Amazamoose and Squirrel Wonder: Chapter Five" – Characters: Rocky, Bullwinkle, Fearless Leader, Boris, Natasha, Director Peachfuzz) | Nominated | |
| 2020 | Annie Awards | Production Design in an Animated Television / Broadcast Production | Chris Mitchell, Chris Turnham, Tor Anut, DanBob Thompson, and Aaron Spurgeon (for "The Legend of the Power Gems: Chapter One") | Nominated | |
| 2020 | Daytime Emmy Awards | Outstanding Directing for an Animated Program | Greg Miller, Howie Perry and Chuck Sheetz | Nominated | |
