= The Adventures of Rocky and Bullwinkle and Friends =

American animated television series

- The show's modern title card, used on home video releases in the 1990s and the mid-2000s
- Also known as: Rocky and His Friends (ABC); The Bullwinkle Show (NBC); The Rocky Show (Syndication); The Rocky and Bullwinkle Show (Syndication/Cartoon Network); The Adventures of Rocky and Bullwinkle (Syndication); The Adventures of Bullwinkle and Rocky (Syndication); Bullwinkle's Moose-O-Rama (Nickelodeon)
- Genre: Surreal comedy; Satire; Variety
- Created by: Jay Ward; Alex Anderson; Bill Scott
- Voices of: June Foray; Bill Scott; Paul Frees; Daws Butler; Edward Everett Horton; Walter Tetley; Charlie Ruggles; Hans Conried
- Narrated by: William Conrad; Paul Frees; Edward Everett Horton
- Theme music composer: Frank Comstock (seasons 1–2); Fred Steiner (seasons 3–5)
- Country of origin: United States
- Original language: English
- No. of seasons: 5
- No. of episodes: 163 (685 segments) (list of episodes)

Production
- Executive producers: Ponsonby Britt; O.B.E.
- Producers: Jay Ward; Bill Scott
- Running time: 23 minutes
- Production companies: Jay Ward Productions; Producers Associates for Television; Gerald Ray Studios (seasons 1–2); Format Films Inc. (seasons 2–3)

Original release
- Network: ABC
- Release: November 19, 1959 – July 10, 1961
- Network: NBC
- Release: September 24, 1961 – June 27, 1964

The Adventures of Rocky and Bullwinkle and Friends (commonly referred to as simply Rocky and Bullwinkle) is an American animated television series that originally aired from November 19, 1959, to June 27, 1964, on the ABC and NBC television networks. Produced by Jay Ward Productions, the series is structured as a variety show, with the main feature being the serialized adventures of the two title characters, the anthropomorphic flying squirrel Rocket J. ("Rocky") Squirrel and moose Bullwinkle J. Moose. The main antagonists in most of their adventures are the two Russian-like spies Boris Badenov and Natasha Fatale, both working for the Nazi-like dictator Fearless Leader. Supporting segments include "Dudley Do-Right" (a parody of old-time melodrama), "Peabody's Improbable History" (a dog named Mr. Peabody and his boy Sherman traveling through time), and "Fractured Fairy Tales" (classic fairy tales retold in comic fashion), among others.

The current blanket title was imposed for home video releases more than 40 years after the series originally aired and was never used when the show was televised; television airings of the show were broadcast under the titles of Rocky and His Friends from 1959 to 1961 on Tuesday and Thursday afternoons on ABC (and again in Canada in 1963), The Bullwinkle Show from 1961 to 1964 on Sunday evening and then late Sunday afternoon on NBC, and The Rocky and Bullwinkle Show (or The Adventures of Rocky and Bullwinkle) as repeats from 1964 to 1973 on Sunday mornings on ABC and in syndication following this.

Rocky and Bullwinkle is known for quality writing and wry humor. Mixing puns, cultural and topical satire, and self-referential humor, it appealed to adults as well as children. It was also one of the first cartoons whose animation was outsourced; storyboards were shipped to Gamma Productions, a Mexican studio also employed by Total Television. The art has a choppy, unpolished look and the animation is extremely limited even by television animation standards at the time, yet the series has long been held in high esteem; some critics described the series as a well-written radio program with pictures.

The show was shuffled around several times during its run, airing in afternoon, prime time, and Saturday-morning cartoon timeslots, and was influential to other animated series from The Simpsons to Rocko's Modern Life. Segments from the series were later recycled in the Hoppity Hooper show. There have been numerous feature film adaptations of the series' various segments, such as the 2000 film The Adventures of Rocky and Bullwinkle, which blended live action and computer animation; and the 1999 live-action film Dudley Do-Right. Both films received poor reviews and were financially unsuccessful. By contrast, an animated feature film adaptation of the "Peabody's Improbable History" segment, Mr. Peabody & Sherman, was released to positive reviews in 2014, but was also financially unsuccessful. A rebooted animated series also based on "Peabody's Improbable History", The Mr. Peabody & Sherman Show, debuted on Netflix in October 2015 and ran to April 2017.

Another reboot animated series based on the main and final segments, The Adventures of Rocky and Bullwinkle premiered on Amazon Prime Video on May 11, 2018. In 2013, Rocky and His Friends and The Bullwinkle Show were ranked the sixth-greatest television cartoon of all time by TV Guide.

== Background ==
The idea for the series came from Jay Ward and Alex Anderson, who previously collaborated on Crusader Rabbit, based upon the original property The Frostbite Falls Revue. This original show never got beyond the proposal stage. It featured a group of forest animals running a television station. The group included Rocket J. Squirrel (Rocky), Oski Bear, Canadian Moose (Bullwinkle), Sylvester Fox, Blackstone Crow, and Floral Fauna. The show in this form was created by Alex Anderson. (The bear and fox characters would later be retooled for Ward's next series, Hoppity Hooper.) Bullwinkle's name came from the name of a car dealership in Berkeley, California, called Bullwinkel Motors. Anderson changed the order of the last two letters of the name and gave the name to his moose.

Ward wanted to produce the show in Los Angeles, but Anderson lived in the San Francisco Bay Area and did not want to relocate. As a result, Ward hired Bill Scott as head writer and co-producer at Jay Ward Productions, and he wrote the Rocky and Bullwinkle features. Ward was joined by writers Chris Hayward and Allan Burns; they eventually became known for creating The Munsters with Burns going to co-create The Mary Tyler Moore Show. In a 1982 interview, Scott said, "I got a call from Jay asking if I'd be interested in writing another series, an adventure script with a moose and a squirrel. I said, 'Sure.' I didn't know if I could write an adventure with a moose and a squirrel, but I never turned down a job."

=== Production ===
The series began with the pilot Rocky the Flying Squirrel. Production began in February 1958 with the hiring of voice actors June Foray, Paul Frees, Bill Scott, and William Conrad. Eight months later, General Mills signed a deal to sponsor the cartoon program, under the condition that the show be run in a late-afternoon time slot, when it could be targeted toward children. Subsequently, Ward hired the rest of the production staff, including writers and designers. However, no animators were hired. Ad executives at Dancer, Fitzgerald and Sample, the advertising agency for General Mills, set up an animation studio in Mexico called Gamma Productions S.A. de C.V., originally known as Val-Mar Animation. This outsourcing of the animation for the series was considered financially attractive by primary sponsor General Mills, but caused endless production problems. In a 1982 interview by animation historian Jim Korkis, Bill Scott described some of the problems that arose during production of the series:

We found out very quickly that we could not depend on Mexican studios to produce anything of quality. They were turning out the work very quickly and there were all kinds of mistakes and flaws and boo-boos ... They would never check ... Mustaches popped on and off Boris, Bullwinkle's antlers would change, colors would change, costumes would disappear ... By the time we finally saw it, it was on the air.

Ponsonby Britt was the credited—but fictional—executive producer of The Rocky and Bullwinkle Show, as well as Fractured Flickers, Hoppity Hooper, and George of the Jungle. In 1959, TV-network executives insisted that its producers under contract must submit official biographies citing their past awards and accomplishments. Ward and Scott, feeling that their own biographies were unimpressive, invented the name "Ponsonby Britt, Limited" as their executive producer. The billing was updated in 1967 to "Ponsonby Britt OBE" (Officer of the Order of the British Empire). Britt's "official" biography was used in press releases.

=== Network television: 1959–1973 ===
The show was titled Rocky and His Friends while airing on ABC...

...and was later re-titled The Bullwinkle Show after its move to NBC

The show was broadcast for the first time on November 19, 1959, on the ABC television network, under the title Rocky and His Friends, twice a week, on Tuesday and Thursday afternoons, following American Bandstand at 4:30 p.m. ET, where it was the highest-rated daytime network program. The show moved to the NBC network starting September 24, 1961, broadcast in color, and first appeared on Sundays at 7:00 p.m., just before Walt Disney's Wonderful World of Color. Bullwinkle's ratings suffered as a result of airing opposite perennial favorite Lassie. A potential move to CBS caused NBC to reschedule the show to late Sunday afternoons (5:30 p.m.) and early Saturday afternoons in its final season. NBC canceled the show in the summer of 1964. It was shopped to ABC, but they were not interested. However, reruns of episodes were aired on ABC's Sunday morning schedule at 11:00 a.m. until 1973, at which time the series went into syndication.

An abbreviated 15-minute version of the series ran in syndication in the 1960s under the title The Rocky Show. This version was sometimes shown in conjunction with The King and Odie, a 15-minute version of Total Television's King Leonardo and His Short Subjects. The King and Odie was similar to Rocky and Bullwinkle in that it was sponsored by General Mills and animated by Gamma Productions.

The Bullwinkle Show returned to network television during the 1981-1982 season, when NBC aired it at 12:30 p.m. ET Saturday afternoons. These were rebroadcasts of the original 35mm network prints as Jay Ward produced them, without the Total Television fillers added to the 16mm syndication prints.

=== Syndication ===
Title card from the syndicated run under the title The Adventures of Bullwinkle and Rocky

Reruns of the show aired on ABC from 1964 to 1973 and from 1981 to 1982 on NBC. On cable, the series had extended runs on Nickelodeon (1992–1996), Cartoon Network (1996–2003) and Boomerang (mid 2000s). Since the late 2000s, The Program Exchange has typically only licensed the series for short-term runs; nationally, the series has seen limited airings on WGN America (2009), VH1 Classic (2012), and Boomerang (2013). Since The Program Exchange's demise, the series has resurfaced over-the-air on MeTV Toons as of 2024, airing under the title "The Adventures of Rocky and Bullwinkle and Friends" for the first time on American television, however the series' broadcast on the station has been paused since January 2025 per request of WildBrain, after the rights reverted from them over to the Jay Ward Estate.

The Rocky and Bullwinkle Show remained in syndicated reruns and was still available for local television stations through The Program Exchange as late as 2016; WBBZ-TV, for instance, aired the show in a strip to counterprogram 10 PM newscasts in the Buffalo, New York, market during the summer 2013 season. The underlying rights were then owned by WildBrain, who acquired the licensing, production, and distribution rights to Ward's library in 2022. They expired, however, in 2025, with them currently being reverted to the Jay Ward Estate. These rights were previously held by Universal Pictures, which acquired the library of predecessor companies DreamWorks Animation and Classic Media in 2016 (coinciding with The Program Exchange's shutdown), and who in turn with copyright holder Ward Productions formed the joint venture Bullwinkle Studios, which managed the Rocky and Bullwinkle properties. Despite the move, Universal still owns the rights to the co-productions Ward produced with DreamWorks.

Sponsor General Mills retained all United States television rights to the series. Two packages, each containing different episodes, are available. The syndicated version of The Bullwinkle Show contains 98 half-hour shows (#801–898). The first 78 comprise the Rocky and Bullwinkle story lines from the first two seasons of the original series (these segments originally aired under the Rocky and His Friends title). Other elements in the half-hour shows (Fractured Fairy Tales, Peabody's Improbable History, Dudley Do-Right of the Mounties, Aesop and Son, and short cartoons including Bullwinkle's Corner and Mr. Know-It-All) sometimes appear out of the original broadcast sequence. The final 20 syndicated Bullwinkle Show episodes feature later Rocky and Bullwinkle story lines (from "Bumbling Bros. Circus" through the end of the series, minus "Moosylvania") along with Fractured Fairy Tales, Bullwinkle's Corner, and Mr. Know-It-All segments repeated from earlier in the syndicated episode cycle. Originally, many syndicated shows included segments of Total Television's The World of Commander McBragg, but these cartoons were replaced with other segments when the shows were remastered in the early 1990s. A package, promoted under the Rocky and His Friends name but utilizing The Rocky Show titles, features story lines not included in the syndicated Bullwinkle Show series.

The most recently syndicated Rocky and His Friends package retains the 15-minute format, consisting of 156 individual episodes, but like The Bullwinkle Show, the content differs from the versions syndicated in the 1960s. The various supporting segments, including Fractured Fairy Tales (91), Peabody's Improbable History (91), and Aesop and Son (39) segments are syndicated as part of Tennessee Tuxedo and His Tales, and 38 of the 39 Dudley Do-Right cartoons are syndicated as part of Dudley Do Right (sic) and Friends. Syndicated versions of the shows distributed outside of the United States and Canada combine the various segments under the package title The Adventures of Rocky and Bullwinkle and Friends; it is this version of the show that is represented on official DVD releases through DreamWorks Classics and the official online version sold at websites such as Amazon Video.

== Characters ==
From left to right: Rocky, Bullwinkle, and Captain Peter "Wrongway" Peachfuzz

The lead characters and heroes of the series are Rocket "Rocky" J. Squirrel, a flying squirrel (who anchors the perspective of the show's younger audience), and his best friend Bullwinkle J. Moose, a dimwitted but good-natured moose (who carries the bulk of the adult humor with his spontaneous puns). Both characters live in the fictional town of Frostbite Falls, Minnesota, which is purportedly based on the real city of International Falls, Minnesota. The scheming villains in most episodes are the fiendish spies Boris Badenov (a pun on Boris Godunov) and Natasha Fatale (a pun on femme fatale), forever attempting to "catch Moose and Squirrel". Other characters include Fearless Leader, the dictator of the fictitious nation of Pottsylvania and Boris and Natasha's superior; Gidney and Cloyd, little green men from the Moon who are armed with "scrooch guns"; Captain Peter "Wrongway" Peachfuzz, the incompetent Ed Wynn-esque captain of the S. S. Andalusia; various U.S. government bureaucrats and politicians (such as Senator Fussmussen from the "Jet Fuel Formula" story, who opposed admitting Alaska and Hawaii to the Union on the grounds of his own xenophobia); and perennial onlookers Edgar and Chauncy.

== Structure ==
When first shown on NBC, the cartoons were introduced by a Bullwinkle puppet, voiced by Bill Scott, who would often lampoon celebrities, current events, and especially Walt Disney, whose program Wonderful World of Color was next on the schedule. Compared with the dim-witted and lovable moose that most fans of the series would grow up with, in this short-lived version Bullwinkle was portrayed as a sarcastic smart-aleck. On one occasion, "Bullwinkle" encouraged children to pull the tuning knobs off their television sets ("It's loads of fun, and that way, you'll be sure to be with us next week!"). The network received complaints from parents of an estimated 20,000 child viewers who actually did so. Bullwinkle told the children the following week to put the knobs back on with glue "and make it stick!" The puppet sequence was dropped altogether. Scott later re-used the puppet for a segment called "Dear Bullwinkle," where letters written for the show were read and answered humorously. Four episodes of "Dear Bullwinkle" are on the Season 1 DVD.

Each episode is composed of two Rocky and Bullwinkle cliffhanger shorts that stylistically emulated early radio and film serials. The plots of these shorts would combine into story arcs spanning numerous episodes. The first and longest story arc was Jet Fuel Formula consisting of 40 shorts (20 episodes). Stories ranged from seeking the missing ingredient for a rocket fuel formula, to tracking the monstrous whale Maybe Dick, to an attempt to prevent mechanical metal-munching moon mice from devouring the nation's television antennas. Rocky and Bullwinkle frequently encounter the two Pottsylvanian nogoodniks, Boris Badenov and Natasha Fatale. In each adventure, the title characters stumble into an absurd situation, which leads to a sequence of further absurd situations.

At the end of most episodes, the narrator, William Conrad, would announce two humorous titles for the next episode that typically were puns of each other (and usually related more to the current predicament than to the plot of the next episode). For example, during an adventure taking place in a mountain range, the narrator would state, "Be with us next time for 'Avalanche Is Better Than None,' or 'Snow's Your Old Man.'" Such a 'This' or 'That' title announcement was borrowed from The Adventures of Sam Spade radio shows produced in 1946–1950. The narrator frequently spoke with the characters, thus breaking the fourth wall.

Episodes were introduced with one of four opening sequences:

- Rocky flies about snow-covered mountains. Below him, hiking on a snowy trail, Bullwinkle is distracted by a billboard featuring his name, and walks off a ledge. He becomes a large snowball as he rolls downhill. Rocky flies to him and pushes against the snowball, slowing it to a halt at the edge of another cliff. Bullwinkle pops out of the snowball to catch the teetering squirrel at the cliff edge.
- In a circus, Rocky is preparing to jump from a high diving board into a tub of water tended by Bullwinkle. However, when Rocky jumps, he ends up flying around the circus tent, while Bullwinkle chases after him carrying the tub. As Rocky lands safely, Bullwinkle tumbles into the tub. This was the same intro used for the Buena Vista VHS series in the early 1990s.
- Rocky is flying acrobatically about a city landscape. Bullwinkle is high atop a flagpole painting, and is knocked from his perch as the squirrel flies by. Rocky attempts to catch the plummeting moose with a butterfly net, but the moose falls through. Rocky then flies lower to find his friend suspended from a clothesline, having fallen into a pair of long johns.
- Similar to the previous opening, Rocky is again flying about the city. Bullwinkle is suspended from a safety harness posting a sign on a large billboard. He loses his balance as the squirrel zooms past him and tumbles off the platform. The moose lands on a banner pole mounted on the side of a building, and the recoil springs him back into the air. He lands on a store awning, slides down, and drops a few feet to a bench on which Rocky is seated. The impact launches the squirrel off the bench, and Bullwinkle nonchalantly catches him in his left hand to end the sequence.

Episodes ended with a bumper sequence in which a violent lightning storm destroys the landscape, appearing to engulf Rocky and Bullwinkle in the destruction and accompanied by dramatic piano music. The music would become more lighthearted, and the ground would scroll upward while the outlines of the heroes gradually appeared. We then see a smiling sun overlooking a barren field which rapidly fills with sunflowers until Rocky and Bullwinkle finally sprout from the ground.

== Supporting features ==
The Rocky and Bullwinkle shorts serve as "bookends" for popular supporting features, including:

- "Dudley Do-Right of the Mounties", a parody of early-20th-century melodrama and silent film serials of the Northern genre. Dudley Do-Right is a Canadian Mountie in constant pursuit of his nemesis, Snidely Whiplash, who sports the standard "villain" attire of black top hat, cape, and large handlebar moustache. This is one of the few Jay Ward cartoons to feature a background music track (by Dennis Farnon). As is standard in Ward's cartoons, jokes often have more than one meaning. A standard gag is to introduce characters in an irised close-up with the name of fictional actors displayed in a caption below, a convention seen in some early silent films. The names are usually silly names or subtle puns, e.g., Abraham Wilkes Booth as Dudley Do-Right, Sweetness N. Light as Nell Fenwick, and Claud Hopper as Snidely Whiplash. On one occasion, Whiplash's role is credited to the then-incarcerated bank robber Willie Sutton. Occasionally, even the scenery is introduced in this manner, as when "Dead Man's Gulch" is identified as being portrayed by "Gorgeous Gorge," a reference to professional wrestler Gorgeous George.

Sherman (left) and Mr. Peabody (right) enter the Wayback machine ca. 1960 to witness another time and place in history.

- "Peabody's Improbable History" features a genius talking dog named Mr. Peabody who has a pet human boy named Sherman. Mr. Peabody is named after a dog belonging to Scott's son John; Sherman is named after UPA director Sherman Glas. Peabody and Sherman use Peabody's "WABAC machine" (pronounced "way-back", spelled WAYBAC in season 1, episode 4 ("Wyatt Earp"), and partially a play on words of the names of early computers such as UNIVAC and ENIAC) to go back in time to discover the real story behind historical events, and in many cases, intervene with uncooperative historical figures to ensure that events transpire as history has recorded. The term "Wayback Machine" is used to this day in Internet applications such as Wikipedia and the Internet Archive to refer to the ability to see or revert to older content. These segments are famous for including a terrible pun at the end. Perhaps the worst one appears in the "Mata Hari" episode, where Peabody explains that the entire population of Scotland was evacuated in a zeppelin: "one nation in dirigible."
- "Fractured Fairy Tales" presented familiar fairy tales and children's stories, but with altered, modernized storylines for humorous, satirical effect. This segment was narrated by Edward Everett Horton; June Foray, Bill Scott, Paul Frees, and Daws Butler supplied the voices. A typical example was their spin on "Sleeping Beauty." In this version, the prince (a caricature of Walt Disney) doesn't wake up Sleeping Beauty; instead, he builds a theme-park around her ("Sleeping Beautyland"), and gets headlines in Variety magazine ("Doze Doll Duz Wiz Biz" and "Doze Doll Dull").
- "Aesop and Son" is similar to "Fractured Fairy Tales", complete with the same theme music, except it deals with fables instead of fairy tales. The typical structure consists of Aesop attempting to teach a lesson to his son using a fable. After hearing the story, the son subverts the fable's moral with a pun. This structure was also suggested by the feature's opening titles, which showed Aesop painstakingly carving his name in marble using a mallet and chisel and then his son, with a jackhammer and raising a cloud of dust, appending "And Son." Aesop was voiced (uncredited) by actor Charlie Ruggles and the son, Junior, was voiced by Daws Butler.
- "Bullwinkle's Corner" features the dimwitted moose attempting to introduce culture into the proceedings by reciting (and acting out) poems and nursery rhymes, inadvertently and humorously butchering them. Poems subjected to this treatment include several by Robert Louis Stevenson ("My Shadow", "The Swing", and "Where Go the Boats"); William Wordsworth's "Daffodils"; "Little Miss Muffet", "Little Jack Horner", and "Wee Willie Winkie"; J. G. Whittier's "Barbara Frietchie"; and "The Queen of Hearts" by Charles Lamb. Simple Simon is performed with Boris as the pie man, but as a variation of the famous Abbott and Costello routine "Who's on First?".
- "Mr. Know-It-All" again features Bullwinkle posing as an authority on any topic. Disaster inevitably ensues. Boris Badenov plays a variety of roles as Bullwinkle's antagonist in most of the segments.
- "The Bullwinkle and Rocky Fan Club", a series of abortive attempts by Rocky and Bullwinkle to conduct club business. The fan club consists only of Rocky, Bullwinkle, Boris, Natasha, and Captain Peter "Wrongway" Peachfuzz. These shorts portray the characters as somewhat out of character, with even more fourth-wall breaks than in the story arcs.

Some later syndication prints of The Bullwinkle Show include short segments of The World of Commander McBragg: a tale-spinning windbag regaling a skeptical friend with exaggerated feats of heroism. These short features were never part of the Bullwinkle canon. They were actually prepared for Tennessee Tuxedo and His Tales (and later shown on The Underdog Show). Although the shorts were animated by the same company, Gamma Productions of Mexico, they were produced for Total Television, rather than Ward Productions. These segments were packaged with pre-1990 syndicated versions of The Bullwinkle Show and appear in syndicated episodes of The Underdog Show, Dudley Do-Right and Friends, and Uncle Waldo's Cartoon Show. Since 1990, this feature has been deleted from the Bullwinkle library and has never been included in Bullwinkle home videos.

== Voice cast ==
Actor	Character(s) voiced
Bill Scott	Bullwinkle, Dudley Do-Right, Fearless Leader, Mr. Peabody, Gidney, Mr. Big, various others
June Foray	Rocky, Natasha Fatale, Nell Fenwick, various witches and princesses in Fractured Fairy Tales, and nearly every other female character in the show
Paul Frees	Boris Badenov, Captain Peter "Wrongway" Peachfuzz, Cloyd, Inspector Fenwick, narrator for Dudley Do-Right (shared), various historical figures in Peabody's Improbable History
Walter Tetley	Sherman
Daws Butler	Aesop Junior, various characters in Fractured Fairy Tales and Aesop and Son
Charlie Ruggles	Aesop
Hans Conried	Snidely Whiplash
William Conrad	narrator for Rocky and Bullwinkle, narrator for Dudley Do-Right (shared)
Edward Everett Horton	narrator for Fractured Fairy Tales

== Cultural impact ==
- In 1962, as a publicity stunt, Ward leased a small island on a lake between Minnesota and Canada, which he named after "Moosylvania", a small island shown in the later Rocky and Bullwinkle cartoons. In a campaign to make the island into the 51st state, he and Scott drove a van across the country to about 50–60 cities collecting petition signatures. Arriving in Washington, D.C., they pulled up to the White House gate to see President Kennedy, and were brusquely turned away. They had arrived during the height of the Cuban Missile Crisis.
- In 2002, Rocky and His Friends ranked #47 on TV Guide's 50 Greatest TV Shows of All Time.
- In 2002, TV Guide named Rocky and Bullwinkle as the joint third-greatest cartoon character of all time.
- In January 2009, IGN named Rocky and Bullwinkle as the 11th-best animated television series.

== Revival attempts ==
There were a few attempts to revive Rocky & Bullwinkle throughout the 1970s. A revival in 1981 parodied the Super Bowl. A script was written, storyboards were produced, the NBC network gave it a green light, but the project was canceled because of objections from the NFL (actual team owners were parodied, the Super Bowl championship was lampooned as the "Stupor Bowl", and Boris was fixing the game).

Another revival attempt took place at Disney in the mid-1980s, back when the company was distributing the show on VHS. Developed by Tad Stones and Michael Peraza Jr., the revival was named The Secret Adventures of Bullwinkle and would have been a modern take on the old Bullwinkle show, with the return of characters like Mr. Peabody and Sherman and Dudley Do-Right and would have featured new segments like "Fractured Scary Tales", a parody of horror films, and a new "Mr. Know It All" skit that, among other things, had Bullwinkle programming a VCR. Before the two presented their pitch, they discovered Disney did not own the Rocky and Bullwinkle franchise, and the concept was abandoned.

== Home media ==
The program debuted on home video with two compilation CED Videodiscs released by RCA during the format's rise in the early 1980s, featuring complete, uncut story arcs and accompanying alternating segments and bumpers. Volume 1 contained the complete story for Wossamotta U, while volume 2 contained Goof Gas Attack and The Three Mooseketeers.

Buena Vista Home Video released the show on VHS, Betamax and LaserDisc in the early 1990s, under the title The Adventures of Rocky and Bullwinkle. These are presented differently from when broadcast. Two "Rocky and Bullwinkle" chapters were sometimes edited together into one (removing the "titles" for the next chapters as well as part of the recap at the beginning of the next), usually showing the storyline in four or five chapters per video. For example, the 12-episode Wossamotta U adventure is reduced to five episodes, and runs about seven minutes shorter. The "Bullwinkle Show" closing was used on these.

The first eight videos were released under the "Classic Stuff" banner, with covers and titles being parodies of famous paintings or painters. Four more videos were released under the "Funny Stuff" banner but, unlike the first eight, these were not numbered, the video titles matched the title of the featured "Rocky and Bullwinkle" storyline, and the covers represented scenes from shows (such as Bullwinkle pulling a rhino out of a hat as the cover for "Painting Theft" (the change in the banner might have been due to a video magazine publishing a letter criticizing the editing).

Volume # (LD #)	VHS/Betamax name	Episodes	Additional segments
1. (1)	"Mona Moose"	"The Treasure of Monte Zoom"	Fractured Fairy Tales: Riding Hoods Anonymous, Bullwinkle's Corner: How to Be Happy (Though Miserable), Peabody's Improbable History: Robinson Crusoe, Mr. Know-it-All: How to Get into the Movies Without Buying a Ticket, Dudley Do-Right: The Disloyal Canadians
2. (1)	"Birth of Bullwinkle"	"The Ruby Yacht"	Bullwinkle's Corner: Little Miss Muffet, Fractured Fairy Tales: Sleeping Beauty, Mr. Know-it-All: How to Catch a Bee and Make Your Honey Happy, Peabody's Improbable History: Robin Hood, Dudley Do-Right: Flicker Rock
3. (2)	"Vincent van Moose"	"Goof Gas Attack"	Mr. Know-it-All: How to Be an Archaeologist and Dig Ancient History, Fractured Fairy Tales: Rapunzel, Dudley Do-Right: Finding Gold, Aesop and Son: The Dog and His Shadow
4. (2)	"Blue Moose"	"Rue Britannia"	Peabody's Improbable History: Cleopatra, Bullwinkle's Corner: The Queen of Hearts, Dudley Do-Right: Mountie Without a Horse, Fractured Fairy Tales: The Ugly Almond Duckling
5. (3)	"La Grande Moose"	"Box Top Robbery"	Dudley Do-Right: Saw Mill, Fractured Fairy Tales: The Frog Prince, Aesop and Son: The Jackrabbits and the Mule
6. (3)	"Canadian Gothic"	Four "Dudley Do-Right" segments, instead of a "Rocky and Bullwinkle" storyline ("Marigolds", "Lure of the Footlights", "Trading Places", and "Snidely Arrested")	Aesop and Son: The Hound and the Wolf, Bullwinkle's Corner: Simple Simon, Fractured Fairy Tales: The Frog Prince, Peabody's Improbable History: The Royal Mounted Police, Mr. Know-it-All: How to Do Stunts in the Movies Without Having the Usher Throw You Out
7. (4)	"Whistler's Moose"	"Moosylvania" and "Moosylvania Saved"	Aesop and Son: The Mice in Council, Mr. Know-it-All: How to Direct Temperamental Movie Stars, Bullwinkle's Corner: Tom Tom the Piper's Son, Peabody's Improbable History: Whistler's Mother, Dudley Do-Right: Railroad Tracks, Fractured Fairy Tales: Little Red Riding Hood
8. (4)	"Norman Moosewell"	"Wossamotta U"	Bullwinkle's Fan Club: Enlarging the Membership, Peabody's Improbable History: William Shakespeare, Fractured Fairy Tales: Son of Rumpelstiltskin, Dudley Do-Right: Mother Love
9. (5)	"Pottsylvania Creeper"	"Pottsylvania Creeper"	Dudley Do-Right: Recruiting Campaign, Bullwinkle's Corner: Mary Had a Little Lamb, Peabody's Improbable History: Lawrence of Arabia, Fractured Fairy Tales: Red White, Mr. Know-It-All: How to Sell Vacuum Cleaners and Clean Up, Aesop and Son: The Centipede and the Snail
10. (5)	"Painting Theft"	"Painting Theft"	Fractured Fairy Tales: Prince Hyacinth and the Dear Little Princess, Mr. Know-it-All: How to Be a Cowpuncher Without Getting Hit Back, Peabody's Improbable History: Mata Hari, Bullwinkle's Corner: Hickory Dickory Dock, Dudley Do-Right: Coming-Out Party
11. (6)	"The Weather Lady"	"The Weather Lady"	Peabody's Improbable History: William Tell, Bullwinkle's Corner: Wee Willie Winkie, Dudley Do-Right: Mortgagin' the Mountie Post, Mr. Know-it-All: How to Escape from Devil's Island and Get Away From it All, Fractured Fairy Tales: Hansel and Gretel
12. (6)	"Banana Formula"	"Banana Formula"	Peabody's Improbable History: Bonnie Prince Charlie, Mr. Know-It-All: How to Win Friends and Be Influential with People, Aesop and Son: The King of the Jungle, Bullwinkle's Corner: The Daffodils, Dudley Do-Right: Trap Bait, Fractured Fairy Tales: The Golden Goose

In 2002, Jay Ward Productions established a partnership with Classic Media called Bullwinkle Studios. From 2003 to 2005, the partnership produced DVDs of the first three seasons of the series, which were renamed (for legal reasons) Rocky & Bullwinkle & Friends. Releases then stalled until 2010, when season 4 was released, in part to commemorate the 50th anniversary of the series. The complete series was released on January 4, 2011, marking the debut of season 5 on DVD. A standalone release of season 5 was released on March 29, 2011. The DVDs for the first three seasons were distributed by Sony Wonder, while seasons 4, 5, and Complete Series sets are currently distributed by Vivendi Entertainment. The complete series was re-released on DVD again on March 12, 2019, by Universal Pictures Home Entertainment, to celebrate the show's 60th anniversary.

The DVD releases use the 1997 remasters of the episodes from international broadcasts, which differ somewhat from the originals. The original opening bumpers as seen on the network run were restored, but the title of the show was replaced with the name "The Adventures of Rocky and Bullwinkle and Friends" (never used during the show's original run, and only on said international broadcasts from 1997) and a modern logo with styling inconsistent with the rest of the animation (pictured) somewhat clumsily inserted into the original bumpers. Because of William Conrad’s absence, Keith Scott was brought in to record the new altered dialogue in the openings, which some viewers found jarring. In addition, a semi-transparent "R&B" logo appears for five seconds at the beginning of each segment in the lower right-hand corner. Some segments were moved from their position in the original episodes. Also, the season 5 shows on DVD recycle supporting features found on the DVDs for the first four seasons. Mathematically, this makes sense, since the total number of supporting features (assuming two used per show) exactly equals the number of shows created during the first four seasons. The first set, most of the second set, and the fifth season set use the opening and closing used for the second season of Rocky and His Friends in 1960-1961, while the last two story arcs in the second set, as well as the third- and fourth-season sets, use the opening and closing from the first season Rocky and His Friends broadcast in 1959-1960. Frank Comstock's musical themes are replaced on the sets with Fred Steiner's music produced for The Bullwinkle Show due to copyright issues regarding the former's music cues. These remasters are the first time a few of these music cues from Fred Steiner have been heard in the series. In addition, the first four season sets include optional Spanish-language audio tracks.

In 2005, Classic Media released a series of "best of" DVD compilations of popular segments of the series: two volumes of The Best of Rocky and Bullwinkle, plus the single-volume The Best of Boris and Natasha, The Best of Mr. Peabody and Sherman, The Best of Fractured Fairy Tales, and The Best of Dudley Do-Right. These compilations contain episodes from the entire run of the show.

On October 30, 2012, Classic Media released a DVD called The Complete Fractured Fairy Tales, which includes all 91 Fractured Fairy Tales segments.

On May 14, 2019, Universal Pictures Home Entertainment released a 2-disc DVD called Mr. Peabody & Sherman: The Complete Collection, which includes all 91 Peabody's Improbable History segments.

During the time the show was available on Hulu (it was offered as a free series before it went to a subscription-only model), the DVD versions of the episodes were used instead of the syndication prints.

DVD name	Ep #	Release date (Region 1)	Discs	Extras
Complete First Season	26	August 12, 2003	4	Network promos; "Savings Stamp Club" episode; "Dear Bullwinkle" bumpers; "The Many Faces of Boris Badenov" (a montage of Boris scenes); two segments from Season Two's "Metal Munching Mice"
Complete Second Season	52	August 31, 2004	4 (double sided)	Interview with June Foray; Three Cheerios commercials (storyboard and final versions); "Moosecalls: The Best of Bullwinkle Sings" (a parody of television ads for compilation records); a segment from Season Three's "Missouri Mish Mash"
Complete Third Season	33	September 6, 2005	4	Bullwinkle puppet openings; "The Best of Bullwinkle Follies" (a vaudeville-themed montage of clips); the first segment of Season Four's "Painting Theft"
Complete Fourth Season	19	August 17, 2010	2	None
Complete Fifth Season	33	March 29, 2011	4	Audio outtake from "Goof Gas Attack"
Complete Series	163	January 4, 2011; March 12, 2019 (re-release)	18	In addition to previous extras, a 70-page "Frostbite Falls Field Guide" detailing the history of the show; "Exceptional Adequacy" award ribbon

=== Gray market releases ===
Years after the Buena Vista VHS releases ended, another series of "Rocky and Bullwinkle" VHS tapes were released, both separately and as a boxed set. These videos included Upsidaisium, The Last Angry Moose, Metal-Munching Mice, Much Mud, and Rue Britannia. However, these were released through GoodTimes Home Video and were not authorized by Ward Productions. The copies used were from 16 mm Bullwinkle Show prints. Some other companies also released unauthorized editions of Rocky and Bullwinkle, including Nostalgia Family Video, which also released all 98 of The Bullwinkle Show package shows via 16 mm Bullwinkle Show prints, and Bridgestone Multimedia, which released eight episodes as Rocky and his Friends using an old broadcast 16 mm print. Digiview Entertainment also released some episodes of it on DVD, under its Toon Factory brand.

The copyright status of these 98 episodes (along with some episodes of Hoppity Hooper) is disputed. As of 2017, the copyright is generally recognized as valid, and attempts to post the gray-market releases on video sites have historically been greeted with DMCA take down notices.

== Reboots ==
On April 12, 2018, it was announced that a reboot of the series from DreamWorks Animation would premiere on Amazon Prime Video on May 11, 2018. The series is executive produced by Scott Fellows and Tiffany Ward (the daughter of Jay). The cast includes Tara Strong as Rocky, Brad Norman as Bullwinkle, Ben Diskin as Boris, Rachel Butera as Natasha, Piotr Michael as Fearless Leader, and Daran Norris as the Narrator.

== In other media ==
=== Advertising ===
- In 1966, the duo appeared between show segments in ads for General Mills' Frosty O's cereal and Kendall "Curad Comic Strips" plastic bandages
- In the mid-1960s, the show promoted the "Rocky and Bullwinkle Saving Stamp Club" (at the time, the U.S. Post Office was directly under control of the federal government). Stamp albums of unused stamps could be exchanged for U.S. savings bonds, which paid interest. To date, Rocky and Bullwinkle have not appeared on any U.S. postage stamps.
- Rocky and Bullwinkle were in a 1986 television commercial for Hershey's Kisses snack pack (this was Bill Scott's final appearance as Bullwinkle before his death).
- In the 1990s, Rocky and Bullwinkle appeared in some ads for Taco Bell, wherein they ate real tacos by stopping Boris and Natasha from selling burgers.
- PDI/DreamWorks CGI versions of Rocky and Bullwinkle appeared in a 2014 advertisement for GEICO, appearing with the GEICO Gecko in the Rocky Mountains. Lauri Fraser voiced Rocky for the commercial, while Tom Kenny voiced Bullwinkle.
- In 2012, Mr. Peabody and Sherman from the "Peabody's Improbable History" segment appeared in MetLife's "Everyone" commercial during the 2012 Super Bowl.

=== Comics ===
- A syndicated daily newspaper comic strip titled Bullwinkle began on July 23, 1962, with original stories drawn by Al Kilgore. It was syndicated by the Bell Syndicate and ended in 1965.
- Rocky and Bullwinkle comic books were published by Dell Comics, Gold Key Comics, Charlton Comics and Star Comics (an imprint of Marvel Comics). All were called Bullwinkle and Rocky. The comics, although for children, did contain numerous references spoofing issues such as celebrity worship or the politics of the 1980s. In one Star Comics issue, Bullwinkle owns a small company, which makes him eligible to compete in a fun run in Washington, D.C., for presidents of small companies. When Bullwinkle says he is there for the race, it is mistaken that he is campaigning for President. The comic also spoofed U.S. President Ronald Reagan, and he personally thanks Bullwinkle for stopping Boris and Natasha by rewarding him with monogrammed jelly beans. Another comic broke the fourth wall when the narrator is outraged at a plot of Boris', to which Boris claims he has control of everyone "by capturing the Marvel Comics building and tying up the editor". When the narrator comments on how this is morally wrong, Boris quiets him by saying, "You will agree or you will not find paycheck in mail this month!" The same issue made reference to the 1988 Olympics, which Boris had engineering in Fort Knox, Kentucky, in an attempt to steal its gold by carving all the bars into gold medals, as well as furnishing false information to every country so Pottsylvania would win all the gold medals (and thus take all true gold) by virtue of default. After Boris is foiled, the narrator comments that the games will go on as planned in real time in Seoul, South Korea.
- From 2013 to 2014, IDW Publishing with DreamWorks Classics and Bullwinkle Studios released comics of Rocky and Bullwinkle, Dudley Do-Right and Peabody and Sherman.
- From 2017 to 2020, American Mythology Productions released comics of Rocky and Bullwinkle and it was written by Todd Livingston.

=== Films ===
- Boris and Natasha: The Movie (1992), is a live-action feature film starring the two villainous spies. Neither Rocky nor Bullwinkle appears in this film; however, the characters of Toots and Harve are identified as "Moose" and "Squirrel" at one point in the film. The film was originally intended for theatrical release, but was premiered on Showtime.
- Dudley Do-Right (1999) is a theatrical live-action film loosely based on the character of the same name, starring Brendan Fraser, Sarah Jessica Parker, and Alfred Molina.
- The Adventures of Rocky and Bullwinkle (2000) is a theatrical film starring Rocky and Bullwinkle. It was a mix of live-action with Rocky and Bullwinkle appearing as computer-animated cartoon characters created by Industrial Light & Magic. June Foray returned to voice Rocky, while Bullwinkle was voiced by Keith Scott. Robert De Niro, Jason Alexander and Rene Russo played the live-action versions of Fearless Leader, Boris and Natasha, respectively. This film takes place 35 years after the show's cancellation.
- Mr. Peabody & Sherman is a 2014 animated film produced by DreamWorks Animation based on the two characters of the same name from the original cartoon.
- Rocky and Bullwinkle is a short animated film produced by DreamWorks Animation, and directed by Gary Trousdale. It was originally planned to theatrically accompany the DreamWorks' feature film, Mr. Peabody & Sherman, but was instead released on the Blu-ray 3D release of the film. The short features Foray reprising Rocky and Tom Kenny as Bullwinkle.

=== Music ===
- In 1962, British Invasion band Herman's Hermits got its name because bandmates thought lead singer Peter Noone looked like Sherman of "Mr. Peabody" fame, and the name "Herman" was close enough to "Sherman" for them.
- In 1997, The Los Angeles Opera toured a children's production, named Les Moose: The Operatic Adventures of Rocky and Bullwinkle, around various L.A. County elementary schools. The story followed Boris and Natasha as they tried to steal the formula for Mooseberry Rocket Fuel from Bullwinkle J. Moose.
- Golden Records released a phonograph album of songs, Rocky the Flying Squirrel & His Friends (1961), using voice actors from the series. Boris and Natasha, for example, sing: "We will double, single and triple cross our very closest friends!"
- A 78 rpm single (Golden 659) was released on yellow vinyl. This had Rocky singing "I Was Born To Be Airborne" on one side, backed with Bullwinkle singing "I'm Rocky's Pal". The single sold in grocery stores. Paul Parnes (who later wrote songs for Sesame Street) is credited as composer. "Some nutty characters get together here for the benefit of the very young. Lots of laughs for the juvenile sense of humor."
- The pseudonymously named Boris Badenough released a record called "Hey Rocky!" on Trax Records in 1986. The record featured a house-music beat underneath clips from the series.
- In 2007, Blackstone Audio released the audio tracks of 15 of the Fractured Fairy Tales on CD.

=== Toys ===
- In 1999, Mattel released a numbered collector series under its Hot Wheels toy line, the "Car-Toon Friends" series. It contained four cars; the now-retired model "XT-3" for Rocky, "Double Vision" for Bullwinkle, "Saltflat Racer" for Natasha and "Lakestar" for Boris. They are no longer produced with these paint jobs and, as of December 2012, are hard to find.

=== Games ===
- TSR, Inc. released Bullwinkle and Rocky Role-Playing Party Game in 1988, a roleplaying game based on the world of Rocky and Bullwinkle. The game consisted of rules, mylar hand puppets, cards, and spinners.
- THQ released The Adventures of Rocky and Bullwinkle and Friends for the Nintendo Entertainment System, Game Boy, and Super NES in 1992. Absolute Entertainment also released a version for the Sega Genesis, in 1993.
- A trivia game, titled Rocky & Bullwinkle's Know-It-All Quiz Game, was released for Windows 95/98 and Mac (for PC), in 1998.
- Zen Studios released an Xbox Live Arcade video game titled Rocky and Bullwinkle for download on April 16, 2008.
- Data East released a pinball machine in 1993. Brazilian video game magazine Ação Games gave the pinball a fun rating 4 out of 4.

== See also ==
- Bullwinkle's Restaurant
- Dudley Do-Right Emporium
