= Pottsylvania =

Imaginary Country In Rocky And his Friends and the Bullwinkle show

- 'The Rocky and Bullwinkle Show' location
- Location of Pottsylvania in Eastern Europe
- Created by: Jay Ward
- Genre: Satirical cartoon series

In-universe information
- Other name: Pottsylvania
- Type: Military Dictatorship
- Population: unknown
- Anthem: Hail Pottsylvania

Pottsylvania is a fictional country that appeared in the television series Rocky and His Friends and The Bullwinkle Show, collectively referred to as Rocky and Bullwinkle. Its name is a parody of the US State of Pennsylvania.

Pottsylvania is a parody of a Cold War-era eastern European country (possibly intended as a satire on East Germany: Pottsylvanian characters often use German words, and the Iron Cross can be seen on military aircraft). It was noted for being a nation dedicated to all matters related to espionage and deceitfulness; children were taught in schools how to commit crimes, for instance, while casual conversations would have double meanings.

Populated entirely by government agents and saboteurs, Pottsylvania is the one nation where the cold war never thawed. Its highest honor was the Double Cross, and its newspaper, The Pottsylvania Eavesdropper, was printed in invisible ink. While many considered Pottsylvania to be a spoof, it was considered offensive by the government of the Soviet Union, which banned Rocky & Bullwinkle as anti-Soviet propaganda.

Pottsylvania's industries, besides espionage, included production of a vehicle called the "Assassin-8". Millions were built despite Pottsylvania having only 12 miles of road. The nation's economy was almost non-existent, with no raw materials, consumer goods or cultural works to provide to the global economy, requiring the nation to use force and trickery to stay afloat. As described in "Goof Gas Attack," Pottsylvania's only actual product is "mean." Thus, Fearless Leader reasons, "We have more mean per square inch than other countries have in a square mile! We must 'export mean' to every other country!" (i.e., declare war). Unfortunately, they can't even get that right. "But anybody could beat us!" his military commanders plead. "Besides being mean, we're all cowards!"

Natural landmarks included "Whynchatakea Peak", a large mountain. The geography of Pottsylvania varies widely from episode to episode, and even scene to scene. Sometimes it appears to be a peninsula, while in others it appears to be either a coastal nation (with seaports) or completely landlocked. Nevertheless, it is accessible by submarine, which appears to be the main form of entry.

Flora and fauna in Pottsylvania included the man-eating Venus flytrap-like plant known as the "Pottsylvania Creeper," and one of the world's few supplies of mooseberry bushes—mooseberries being an ingredient used (in Rocky and Bullwinkle's world) for the production of rocket fuel.

The government of Pottsylvania had been headed by a uniformed dictator known as Fearless Leader and a clique of sycophantic advisers. (In some episodes, another important government figure is Mr. Big.) Boris Badenov and Natasha Fatale seemed to be Fearless Leader's most frequently used secret agents, often sent to execute the country's schemes for gaining global power. This is mainly because, as Fearless Leader once remarked to Boris: "You work cheap."

== National anthem ==
"Hail Pottsylvania" is the national anthem of Pottsylvania, which appears in the serial Missouri Mish Mash of The Adventures of Rocky and Bullwinkle.

Lyrics:

Hail, Pottsylvania
Hail to the black and the blue!
Hail, Pottsylvania
Sneaky and crooked through and through,
Down with the good guys, up with the boss
Under the sign of the triple cross, hey!
Hail, Pottsylvania,
Hail, hail, hail!
