= Fearless Leader =

American animated television character

- Rocky and Bullwinkle character
- First appearance: Jet Fuel Formula (1959)
- Created by: Jay Ward; Alex Anderson; Bill Scott
- Portrayed by: Christopher Neame (1992 film); Robert De Niro (2000 film)
- Voiced by: Bill Scott (1959–1964); Keith Scott (1998–2000); Thomas Lennon (2014); Piotr Michael (2018–2019)

In-universe information
- Nickname: F.L.

Fearless Leader is the main antagonist in the 1959–1964 animated television series Rocky and His Friends and The Bullwinkle Show, both shows often collectively referred to as The Rocky and Bullwinkle Show. He is the employer of fellow primary villains Boris Badenov and Natasha Fatale, serving as an antagonist in some episodes of the series. He was originally voiced by Bill Scott.

== Character overview ==
Fearless Leader is a dictator from the fictional country Pottsylvania, and the employer of the inept spies Boris Badenov and Natasha Fatale. He could always be found in his underground hideout, "Central Control." However, it seems evident that he did answer to one man himself: the diminutive Mr. Big. Mr. Big appears in two storylines of the series, "Upsidaisium" and "Metal Munching Moon Mice."

Fearless Leader has a notable face scar (possibly a dueling scar), much like the Nazi Otto Skorzeny, who may have been the inspiration for the character. As expected from his given position and name, Fearless Leader is a strict, ruthless character, and often harshly criticizes the incompetence of his main minion Gerald. He is usually shown with a long scar on his cheek and a monocle, both associated with German military officers in the first half of the 20th century, and he is sometimes shown to possess sharp carnivorous teeth. He is distrustful of his own employees, and is known to carry the Pottsylvania treasury with him wherever he goes. Although Pottsylvania's chief spies are given ersatz Russian accents, Fearless Leader's accent seems more in keeping with the Prussian militarist German stereotype. His monocle and sharply angled features closely resemble Erich von Stroheim and characters from a 1942 anti-Nazi propaganda poster circulated during World War II. He uses some German such as "Achtung" and "schweinhund," typical of German stereotypes in film and TV.

== In other media ==
- Fearless Leader appears in live-action in two films: he is portrayed by Christopher Neame in Boris and Natasha: The Movie (1992) and by Robert De Niro in The Adventures of Rocky and Bullwinkle (2000).
- Fearless Leader was also the background picture seen hanging on the wall in the old newspaper cartoon, "Grin and Bear It" by Lichty, whenever the Kremlin or politburo was being lampooned.
- Fearless Leader appears in the short film Rocky & Bullwinkle, which was released with Mr. Peabody & Sherman on Blu-ray 3D on October 14, 2014, in which he was voiced by Thomas Lennon who also wrote the short along with Robert Ben Garant.
- In the Amazon Video series The Adventures of Rocky and Bullwinkle, Fearless Leader is voiced by Piotr Michael. In the series, he has more participation than in the original, as he usually decides to carry on his plans by himself after Boris and Natasha are outsmarted by Rocky and Bullwinkle. He is given a more comical and accident-prone personality.
