= Bullwinkle J. Moose =

Fictional cartoon character

- The Bullwinkle Show character
- First appearance: Rocky and His Friends (1959)
- Created by: Alex Anderson; Jay Ward
- Voiced by: Bill Scott (1959–1985); Chuck McCann (Wish commercial); Scott Wilson (Bullwinkle's Call of the Wild Show, WYME TV animated skits for Bullwinkle's Restaurant); Bill Broughton (singing voice in Bullwinkle's Restaurant); Frank Welker (TV ads, including Taco Bell commercials); Keith Scott (1992–2000; 2012); Tom Kenny (2014; 2024); Brad Norman (2018–2019)

In-universe information
- Species: Western moose
- Gender: Male
- Relatives: Grandwinkle (grandmother, reboot)
- Nationality: American

Bullwinkle J. Moose is a fictional character and one of the two main protagonists of the 1959–1964 animated television series Rocky and His Friends and The Bullwinkle Show, often collectively referred to as Rocky and Bullwinkle, produced by Jay Ward and Bill Scott. When the show changed networks in 1961, the series moved to NBC and was retitled The Bullwinkle Show, where it stayed until 1964. It then returned to ABC, where it was in repeats for nine more years. It has been in syndication ever since.

In 1996, Bullwinkle was ranked #32 on TV Guide's 50 Greatest TV Stars of All Time.

== Creation ==
Jay Ward and his business partner Alex Anderson created Bullwinkle for The Frostbite Falls Review, a storyboard idea which was never developed into a series. They gave him the name "Bullwinkle Jay Moose" after Clarence Bullwinkel, who owned a Ford dealership at College and Claremont, in Oakland, California, because they thought it was a funny name. Both Bullwinkle and Rocky were given the middle initial "J" in reference to Jay Ward.

From his debut along with Rocky, Bullwinkle's gloves were blue. Later in the second story arc and for the rest of the series, they become white. Also, in contemporary promotion art, Bullwinkle's antlers are a yellow in contrast to the rest of his body; originally they were brown.

== Biography ==
Bullwinkle shared a house with his best friend Rocket "Rocky" J. Squirrel in the fictional small town of Frostbite Falls, Minnesota, a spoof of the real-life American town of International Falls, Minnesota. Bullwinkle attended college at "Wossamotta U" (a play on "What's the matter with you") on a football scholarship. He is a long-time supporter of the Bull Moose Party, and at one time was the part-owner, part-governor of the island of Moosylvania. Bullwinkle is shown at numerous times to be quite wealthy. In seasons 1 and 2, he makes reference to having an Uncle Dewlap, who bequeathed Bullwinkle vast amounts of wealth (in the form of a cereal boxtop collection and an Upsidaisium mine); he also has a large petty cash stockpile hidden in his mattress that he accumulated delivering newspapers (as revealed in "The Last Angry Moose"). In the half-cartoon, half-live-action movie The Adventures of Rocky and Bullwinkle, Bullwinkle receives an Honorary Mooster's Degree from Wossamotta U, due to the nefarious plans of Boris Badenov.

== Personality ==
Bullwinkle was noted for being well-intentioned, but also quite foolish, which made for a source of jokes and plot devices during the show's run. Despite this, the so-called "moronic moose" often aided the brains of the "moose-and-squirrel" duo, Rocky, during their various adventures. Although on opposite ends of the I.Q. scale, he and the "plucky squirrel" had a shared sense of optimism, persistence and traditional ethics and moral standards. Although not as brainy as Rocky, Bullwinkle often made references breaking the fourth wall, so he was not always as clueless and goofy as he appeared. His apparent lack of brilliance also had positive side effects, making him immune to mind-numbing chemicals in "Goof Gas Attack" and being the only person able to properly handle the Kirwood Derby hat in "Missouri Mish Mash". His voice is nasally, with a slight lisp added.

Bullwinkle also hosted other segments of the program, including: "Mr. Know-It-All", where he tried to demonstrate his supposed (albeit nonexistent) expertise on a variety of subjects, such as disarming bombs, curing hiccups or escaping from Devil's Island; "Bullwinkle's Corner", where the moose would attempt to read poetry, notably "I Wandered Lonely as a Cloud" (The Daffodils) of William Wordsworth; and various interstitial drop-ins. In one running gag, Bullwinkle would attempt to pull a rabbit out of a top hat (to Rocky's dismissal: "Again?" or "But that trick never works.", and Bullwinkle's canonical rejoinder, "Nothing up my sleeve...Presto." or "This time, for sure. Presto."), only to pull out something unexpected instead such as a lion, tiger, bear, rhinoceros and occasionally even Rocky himself. After each failed attempt, Rocky segued to a commercial by saying, "Now, here's something we hope you'll really like."

== Voice ==
Bill Scott, Ward's partner and head writer of the series, was the original voice of Bullwinkle. According to Scott, Ward simply assumed that Scott would play the role. Scott would voice the character for many years, even after production of the original series ended in 1964. One post-series project involving Scott would be an animatronic stage show for Bullwinkle's Family Food N' Fun Restaurant (often shortened to Bullwinkle's Restaurant). The show's soundtracks would mark one of Scott's final roles as Bullwinkle and Dudley Do-Right, as he died of a heart attack in 1985. At the time of his death, Scott had finished voicing another Moose character, Moosel, for the first season of The Wuzzles.

Following Scott's death in 1985, Bullwinkle would then be voiced by Australian voice actor Keith Scott (no relation to Bill) throughout the 1980s and 1990s. Keith's most famous portrayal of the character was in the 2000 Universal Pictures film The Adventures of Rocky and Bullwinkle.

Scott Wilson (best known for his Chuck E. Cheese's voice work) voiced the Bullwinkle character for a 1980 live tour production, Bullwinkle's Call of the Wild Show. He would later reprise the role in the form of WYME TV animated skits Wilson personally produced for Bullwinkle's Restaurants around 1996.

Bullwinkle was voiced by Tom Kenny for the short film Rocky and Bullwinkle, which was to be premiered with Mr. Peabody & Sherman, but the short was replaced with an alien-themed short called Almost Home, based on the then-upcoming film from DreamWorks, Home. However, the short is available in both 2D and 3D on the Blu-ray 3D disc of Mr. Peabody & Sherman. Kenny also voiced Bullwinkle in a GEICO commercial the same year to promote the short. In the 2018 Amazon Video series The Adventures of Rocky and Bullwinkle, Bullwinkle was voiced by Brad Norman.
