= List of Rocky and Bullwinkle episodes =

The following is a list of Rocky and Bullwinkle segments of the American animated television feature The Adventures of Rocky and Bullwinkle and Friends (1959–1964). In the original broadcasts and later subsequent DVD releases, two Rocky and Bullwinkle "serial" segments were aired as part of each 23 minute program, which consisted of several supporting features (including "Dudley Do-Right of the Mounties", "Aesop and Son", "Fractured Fairy Tales", "Peabody's Improbable History", "Bullwinkle's Corner", and "Mr. Know-it All") as well as bumpers.

== Overview ==
There is a difference of opinion regarding the titles famously used as teasers at the end of most Rocky and Bullwinkle segments to promote the next episode (e.g. "Don't miss tomorrow's exciting episode: Bullwinkle's Ride or Goodbye, Dollink"). Some sources, such as IMDb, use them as actual titles for the individual episodes. Others, however, regard them simply as each segment's final gag (most involve cultural references—sometimes rather obscure puns) rather than as actual titles. While these titles are mentioned at the end of most episodes they never appear in or on the episodes to which they supposedly refer (NOTE: The episode titles used below are the titles used on title cards in syndicated versions. Indeed, while these titles invariably refer to the characters' predicament at the end of the segment, they often do not apply to anything that actually appears in the subsequent episode. The Rocky and Bullwinkle DVDs do not use these titles, referring to the individual segments simply by number. However, Keith Scott's The Moose That Roared, prepared in cooperation with Jay Ward's family and production company, does use them.).

The first two seasons appeared on ABC as Rocky and His Friends. The last three seasons aired on NBC as The Bullwinkle Show. Today they are known collectively as The Rocky and Bullwinkle Show or simply Rocky and Bullwinkle. For legal reasons, current DVD editions title the reassembled programs The Adventures of Rocky and Bullwinkle and Friends.

Rocky and Bullwinkle story arcs generally end with the title characters riding off into the sunset. Rather than promoting a specific upcoming episode or story line the narrator simply exhorts viewers to "tune in next time" for the heroes' further adventures. Thus, the initial segment of each story arc is not named in the preceding episode; these episodes take their names from the story arc that they begin.

== Season 1 (1959–60) ==
The first season contained 26 half-hour shows, each of which included 5 segments (making 130 segments in total). Production of the first season was intentionally halted after twenty-six shows, as twenty-six weekly programs would fill exactly half a year and simplify any rerun schedule.

=== Jet Fuel Formula ===
The first story in the series is also the longest (Jet Fuel Formula covers forty episodes while the average story arc includes approximately sixteen). It is also noteworthy in that it established most of the characters, themes, running gags, and other elements that would be employed in later stories and that would become so closely identified with the Rocky and Bullwinkle programs in the years since.

Bullwinkle and Rocky are introduced when their cake recipe proves to be an excellent rocket propellant, but it draws the attention of two notorious spies (Boris and Natasha) as well as two alien beings from the Moon itself. The character designs -- especially the design of Boris -- are slightly but noticeably different in the very first installment of the serial, quickly developing into their more familiar forms over subsequent installments. As well, William Conrad's later-flamboyant narration is much more subdued early on.

In spite of the title, the story actually concerns the pursuit of a formula for rocket fuel.

Chapter	Title
1	"Jet Fuel Formula"
At the Slick Observatory, "Eggheads" and "Doubledomes" look through the telescope and see Rocky and Bullwinkle in space, mistaking them for moon creatures. After landing back on Earth, they tell the story of how Bullwinkle was trying to bake his grandmother‘s fudge cake recipe, but accidentally discovered a "great new rocket fuel“. They are assigned to the "Guided Moose—le" department of the U.S Government, but in the explosion, the recipe got torn in half ("I know how much, but not what of"!). As if that weren‘t enough, two spies, Boris and Natasha, want to steal the formula for their home land, Pottsylvania. Natasha gives Bullwinkle a bomb wrapped as a present.
2	"Bullwinkle's Ride" "Goodbye Dollink"
Natasha gives Bullwinkle the bomb, but the door got locked, so, trying to get out of the explosion, Natasha throws the present out the window, exploding Boris. Meanwhile, the whole country tries to make Bullwinkle‘s cake recipe, even science in college teaches fudge—making. Back at the lab, Rocky and Bullwinkle were continuing to make the rocket fuel, when a scaly green hand pointed a gun at them.
3	"Bullseye Bullwinkle" "Destination Moose"
The green hand reveals to be real moon men, Gidney and Cloyd, who don‘t want Rocky and Bullwinkle to find the formula, because they don‘t want tourists invading the moon. But Rocky and Bullwinkle don‘t have the formula, and so they have to leave until they do. Rocky and Bullwinkle, still astounded by this, are on their way home, when Boris and Natasha, following orders, drop a safe on them.
4	"Squeeze Play" "Invitation to the Trance"
It turns out the orders actually said, "Do not keel moose". Boris, realizing his mistake, rushes down and gets crushed by the safe. Rocky and Bullwinkle continue cooking cakes, none of them explode, however, so in order for them to remember, Boris poses as a hypnotist, and sends Bullwinkle to sleep. Boris orders Bullwinkle to say everything he knows, so Bullwinkle does just that (early days, days at school, experiences in the army, etc..). When Bullwinkle finally gets to his cake recipe, the only people who heard it were Gidney and Cloyd, who schrooch him.
5	"The Scrooched Moose"
The Moon Men take Bullwinkle to their ship. Boris wakes up and notices Gidney and Cloyd taking the moose, so he tells them that they should take Rocky too, but when they leave, Boris takes the moose with him. After Gidney and Cloyd take Rocky, he tells them that they shouldn‘t miss "the big party", but they need their "entertainment chairmen" (Bullwinkle), but by the time they go get him, he‘s gone. 8 hours later, Bullwinkle gets un—scrooched, and Boris poses as his new lab assistant. Bullwinkle tells the recipe to Boris‘s earpiece, connected to a secret lab in Pottsylvania.
6	"Monitored Moose" "The Carbon Copy Cats"
Bullwinkle tells Boris the recipe, but after he realizes Boris might not be who he says he is, he instead puts chemistry materials in it, leading to an explosion in the Pottsylvanian lab, and chocolate pan dowdy in Bullwinkle‘s, which catches the nose of Rocky, who follows signs to Boris‘s house, but gets into a trap.
7	"Rocky's Dilemma" "Squirrel in a Stew"
The trap leads to a hot air balloon, flying all the way to the ocean. Meanwhile, Bullwinkle experiments with chemicals, leading to an explosion. Rocky and Bullwinkle‘s disappearance catches the eye of the local news, hunters, and most importantly, the Moon Men, who go door to door for information, before ending up at Boris‘s house, where a party is being held, but the "noisemakers" make a hole through the second floor. Boris makes punch for the Moon Men, with poison inside. Meanwhile, the balloon is still flying, when a bolt of lightning makes it explode, making Rocky fall towards the ocean.
8	"The Submarine Squirrel" "20,000 Leagues Beneath the Sea"
Luckily, Rocky managed to escape the falling balloon basket, and glided back to shore. Unfortunately, his flight gets picked up by an air force radar, making the army shoot at him, before he makes a pattern in the smoke, telling them he's a US taxpayer. Rocky continues flying, this time escorted by jet plane. The "noisemakers" make a hole through the second floor, causing Bullwinkle to fall. Rocky makes it to the house, where they drink the poisonous punch, causing Boris and Natasha to fall asleep, but not Bullwinkle or the Moon Men. Rocky finally makes it, so they go back to the lab, but not before they all get arrested.
9	"Bars and Stripes Forever"
Rocky, Bullwinkle, and the Moon Men are stopped by the government who ask if the Moon Men are spies. Cloyd scrooches one of the agents for 50 years, before Rocky and Bullwinkle deny the claim. A ceremony is held to commemorate the first government agent to be scrooched in the line of duty. A statue is built in his honor, but unbeknownst to the public, the statue is actually composed of the scrooched agent painted white on top of a pedestal. Following the ceremony, the Moon Men are beloved by general public and 'Moon Men mania" takes over the world. The Moon Men eventually become fed up with the constant attention and plan to return to the Moon with Rocky and Bullwinkle to prevent them from discovering the rocket fuel formula.
10	"Hello Out There!" "There's No Place Like Space"
As the Moon Men take flight with Rocky and Bullwinkle, they realize that they're out of rocket fuel. They immediately fall towards the ground in a forest. Rocky urges Bullwinkle that this is their chance to escape, but Cloyd threatens to scrooch them. Rocky explains that if Cloyd scrooches them, none of them will be able to reach the Moon. Rocky proposes that the Moon Men give them the recipe so that they can create some rocket fuel, which the Moon Men agree to. After reading the recipe, Rocky concludes that gathering the ingredients won't be too hard, save for Mooseberry Juice, which Gidney explains is found in Frostbite Falls. Rocky, Bullwinkle, and Gidney begin to search for Frostbite Falls in a book with a map of the U.S., which Gidney suggests using a microscope to find. Meanwhile, Boris and Natasha have stolen the rocket fuel from the Moon Men's ship to deliver it to an unknown location via a scheduled submarine.
11	"A Creep in the Deep" "Will Success Spoil Boris Badenov?"
As Boris and Natasha travel in their submarine towards their destination, Boris feels he is forgetting something. Natasha tells him to cheer up and sends a radiogram to central control with Boris' message telling them that they have acquired the fuel. However, central control reminds them that they still need to "Keel... moose" in their response, which is what Boris forgot. Boris sets the submarine on auto-pilot and they bail in order to kill Bullwinkle. Meanwhile, Rocky and Bullwinkle are struggling to find transportation straight to Frostbite Falls, until Rocky gains the bright idea to rent a private jet. Upon meeting the owner of the jet, Rocky and Bullwinkle realize that they don't have enough money for a flight. Suddenly, a disguised Boris offers an 85-cent private flight, which is how much Rocky has. Natasha, acting as a flight attendant, informs the duo to buckle their one-way seatbelts as the plane takes flight.
12	"Ace Is Wild" "The Flying Casket"
A disguised Natasha offers Rocky and Bullwinkle a poisoned drink, but the plane hits an air pocket, causing the drink to splatter on the floor and eat through the hull of the plane. With no other ways to kill Rocky and Bullwinkle, Boris and Natasha destroy the plane's instruments and toss out all helpful supplies. Natasha parachutes out, as Rocky and Bullwinkle realize they've been sabotaged and the plane is falling. Meanwhile, a couple of mysterious fellas are monitoring the self-travelling submarine, but miscalculate where the submarine would hit the shore; the submarine hits shore in the wrong area and explodes.
13	"The Back Seat Divers" "Mashed Landing"
As Boris is about to jump out of the plane, he receives a radio message from Fearless Leader, ordering him not to kill Moose but instead keep him alive. Boris unlocks Rocky and Bullwinkle's seatbelts and gives Bullwinkle his parachute so Bullwinkle can land safely. With Rocky and Bullwinkle out of the plane, Boris crashes into the top of a big tree, which Natasha is sitting in. Once they've landed, Rocky and Bullwinkle help the still disguised Boris and Natasha from the tree and resume their search for Mooseberries, unaware that Boris and Natasha are now following them. Rocky and Bullwinkle reach the island that is home to Mooseberries, which is blocked off for the Mooseberries have the Mooseberry Blight. Bullwinkle creates a plan involving him swimming to the island to retrieve the Mooseberries, but upon diving into the water, he remembers that he cannot swim, which causes him to fall off a waterfall nearby, which he also forgot about.
14	"Bullwinkle's Water Follies" "Antlers Aweigh"
While falling down the waterfall, Bullwinkle is snagged on a Mooseberry branch. Rocky ties a rope to a tree at the top of the falls and swings from the end of it to grab Bullwinkle. In attempting to do so, Bullwinkle swings him and Rocky to land, causing the Mooseberry branch to become unattached to the falls and attached to him. Meanwhile, Boris and Natasha are unsure whether to help Bullwinkle, so they contact Central Control, who tell them that since the port where the rocket fuel was supposed to be blew up, they need to retrieve the rocket fuel formula. Rocky and Bullwinkle begin returning to Washington so that they can create the formula and prevent the Mooseberries from catching the Blight. Upon Rocky mentioning that the Mooseberries are the secret ingredient for the formula, Boris poses as a FPI (Federal Plant Inspector) and sprays the Mooseberries for the Blight. However, he purposefully sprays an egregious amount that allows him to take the branch and escape without being seen.
15	"The Inspector-Detector" "A Kick in the Plants"
When the smoke clears, Rocky and Bullwinkle realize the plant is gone but they still plan to return to Washington, D.C. by using the body of the crash-landed plane in the tree as a boat to row down the river. Meanwhile, Boris and Natasha are disguised as Indians in a canoe with the Mooseberries when they see Rocky and Bullwinkle rowing down the river by using the hull of the plane as a boat and the fins of the plane as paddles. Boris attempts to halt them from catching up to him and Natasha by chopping down a tree over the river from a high cliff, but the tree is too long, which causes it to hit the top of the adjacent cliff on the opposite side of the river and break into two. The end of the tree with leaves lands in the middle of Rocky and Bullwinkle's boat, which makes it serve as a mast, helping them progress down the river at a faster rate with the downside of it also causing their boat to start to sink. Boris and Natasha scramble back to their canoe and paddle insanely fast to beat Rocky and Bullwinkle to Washington. Note: "The Inspector-Detector" is incorrectly pronounced as "The Inspector-Detectors".
16	"Canoes Who?" "Look Before You Leak"
Rocky and Bullwinkle continue using a bucket to propel themselves down the river as Boris encourages Natasha to row in their canoe quickly. As the two boats fly down the river, they both end up in the Great Lakes and walk their boats once they reach land. Rocky asks a traffic guard in Chicago which way to walk to Fort Wayne, to which the guard points in a direction. The two boats make way through the Gold Boat Power Race, St. Lawrence Seaway, creeks, irrigation ditches, water troughs, (which people watch them in) city parks, a Tunnel of Love, and streets before finally reaching Washington. Upon reaching Washington, the sky is foggy, which prevents the two duos to see that they are a few yards from each other, until they hear each other. Boris deduces that Rocky and Bullwinkle are behind them and changes a sign directing boats to avoid turning left towards a sawmill to instead turn left. After turning left, Rocky and Bullwinkle notice that the sawmill is right in front of them now that the fog has cleared up. Note: On screen, text only displaying "Canoes Who" is seen.
17	"Two for the Ripsaw..." "Goodbye, Mr. Chips"
As Rocky and Bullwinkle's makeshift boat is split in two, Rocky and Bullwinkle are unscathed since they each are on the left and right of the boat, narrowly avoiding the saw. A pair of claws then pick up the duo and dump them into soap crates, which are part of a soapbox assembly line that is delivering soap crates to a Congressmen himself, who is relieved for the Rocket Fuel scientists to have returned. Rocky and Bullwinkle return to their laboratory, but are greeted with the tossing of objects through their laboratory's window from townsfolk below that are mad that they failed to retrieve the Mooseberries. Meanwhile, Natasha eventually collapses after rowing most of the entire journey from Frostbite Falls to Washington D.C. Boris and Natasha switch roles, with Boris now rowing and Natasha encouraging him, but after rowing once, they reach Washington, much to Natasha's anger since she rowed a considerably more amount than Boris. Upon reaching land, they run into Captain Plopof at a dock, who informs them that the submarine is "kaput," and that Central Control wishes for somebody to swim from Washington back to Pottsylvania. The trio play a rigged (by Boris) game of drawing straws, which results in the Captain swimming back. Following the game, Natasha and Boris steal tickets and hop onto a ship from New York to Pottsylvania.
18	"Farewell, My Ugly" "Knots to You"
Rocky and Bullwinkle decide to track down the Moon Men to find another Mooseberry Bush. They race to the Moon Men's apartment in New York, but discover that the Moon Men are actually performing in Vegas after confusing headlines from a newspaper are translated using a machine. Rocky calls the Moon Men asking if there is another area where they can find a Mooseberry Bush, to which Gidney answers that the one other area where they can find a Mooseberry Bush is in Pottsylvania. Gidney also explains that he would like to help them, but can't as him and Cloyd are booked for the next three years. Thus, Rocky and Bullwinkle book a cruise across the ocean to Pottsylvania, which happens to be the same cruise Boris and Natasha are sailing on.
19	"Cheerful Little Pierful" "Bomb Voyage"
As Boris and Natasha are about to board the ship, they are stopped by security for they cannot bring plants on-board due to a Mooseberry Bush having gone missing. Boris and Natasha return, posing the Mooseberry Bush on Natasha's head as a hat. Despite being suspicious of the hat, they are still let on board. Boris sends a carrier pigeon with a message to Central Control asking what to do since Rocky and Bullwinkle are right behind them and Natasha packed the radio in the suitcase they brought. However, the pigeon cannot fly back to Boris since it has lost its feathers due to the carrier pigeon being propelled over the ocean by a miniature jet made with carbon dioxide, so Central Control sends the message via radio. Captain Peachfuzz asks Boris if everything is alright since Boris is trying to shush the radio to no avail. Boris assures him he is. Meanwhile, Rocky and Bullwinkle begin walking across the gangplank onto the ship while being booed by an audience from the shore. As they're walking across it though, one of the chains holding it up is broken since Boris snipped a chain after receiving confirmation from Central Control to kill Bullwinkle. Rocky and Bullwinkle float in the water hopelessly between the ship and the pier as the ship floats closer and closer to the pier.
20	"Summer Squash" "He's Too Flat for Me"
21	"The Earl and the Squirrel" "The March of Crime"
22	"Adrift in the Mist" "Fog Groggy"
23	"The Deep Six" "The Old Moose and the Sea"
24	"The Slippery Helm" "Captain's Outrageous"
25	"Bullwinkle Makes a Hit" "I Get a Bang out of You"
26	"Three on an Island" "Tell It to the Maroons"
27	"Dancing on Air" "The Pottsylvania Polka"
28	"Axe Me Another" "Heads You Lose!"
29	"The Pen Pals" "Rock Hocky Rocky"
30	"The Fright-Seeing Trip" "Visit to a Small Panic"
31	"Boris Burgles Again" "Sinner Takes All"
32	"Danger Ahead" "Watch Out for Falling Rockys"
33	"Avalanche is Better Than None" "Snows Your Old Man"
34	"Below Zero Heroes" "I Only Have Ice for You"
35	"The Snowman Cometh" "An Icicle Built for Two"
36	"The Moonman Is Blue" "The Inside Story"
37	"Fuels Rush In" "Star Spangled Boner"
38	"The Pottsylvania Permanent" "I've Grown Accustomed to the Place"
39	"The Boundary Bounders" "Some Like It Shot"
40	"The Washington Whirl" "Rocky Off the Record"

=== Box Top Robbery ===
The world's economy becomes so dependent on box top refunds that Boris and Natasha are able to cause worldwide sabotage via counterfeiting.

Chapter	Title
1	"Box Top Robbery"
2	"A Fault in the Vault" "Banks a Million"
3	"Calaboose Moose" "The Crime of Your Life"
4	"When a Felon Needs a Friend" "Pantomime Quisling"
5	"Give ‘Em the Works" "Rocky Around the Clock"
Note: "Rocky Around the Clock" is narrated as "Rock Around the Clock".
6	"Crime on My Hand" "Hickory Dickory Drop"
7	"Down to Earth" "The Bullwinkle Bounce"
8	"Fall Story" "Adrift in the Lift"
9	"The Ground Floor" "That's Me All Over!"
10	"Fools Afloat" "All the Drips at Sea"
11	"Water on the Brain" "The Deep Six and 7/8"
12	"Bullwinkle Goes to Press" "All the Moose That's Fit to Print"

== Season 2 (1960–61) ==
The second season contained 52 episodes and 260 segments, the most out of any of the five seasons. During this period the program was broadcast semiweekly.

=== Upsidaisium ===
Bullwinkle inherits a mine on Mount Flatten. When he and Rocky go there, they find that Mount Flatten floats in the sky because it is the only source of upsidaisium, the anti-gravity metal. Its value is such that Boris and Natasha's overlord, Mister Big, becomes personally involved in attempts to steal first the mountain and then the government's storehouse of ore.

Chapter	Title
1	"Upsidaisium"
2	"Big Bomb at Frostbite Falls" "The Exploding Metropolis"
3	"The Road to Ruin" "Mine over Matter"
4	"Two Flying Ghosts" "High Spirits"
5	"Crash Drive" "Oedipus Wrecks"
6	"Fender Benders" "The Asphalt Bungle"
7	"Burning Sands" "The Big Hot Foot"
8	"Death in the Desert" "A Place in the Sun"
9	"The Boy Bounders" "Plane Punchy"
10	"A Peek at the Peak" "Your Climb is my Climb"
11	"You've Got a Secret" "Out of Sight, Out of Mine"
12	"Boris and the Blade" "Shiek Rattle and Roll"
13	"Sourdough Squirrel" "Hardrock Rocky"
14	"A Creep at the Switch" "Sudden Pacific"
15	"The Train on the Plane" "The Overland Express"
16	"Danger in the Desert" "Max Attacks"
17	"The Missing Mountain" "Peek-a-Boo Peak"
18	"Go Down Mooses (seen on screen as "Go Down Moses")" "The Fall Guy"
19	"Rocky and the Rock" "Braver and Boulder"
20	"Mountain Mover" "Boris Sneaks a Peak"
21	"Bullwinkle's Rise" "This Goon for Higher"
22	"Boris Bites Back" "Rebel Without a Pause"
23	"Bullwinkle at the Bottom" "A Mish-Mash Moose"
24	"Double Trouble" "The Moose Hangs High"
25	"Jet Jockey Rocky (seen on screen as "Jet Jocky Rocky")" "One Point Landing"
26	"Plots and Plans" "Too Many Crooks"
27	"The Cliff Hangar" "Taken for Granite"
28	"Supersonic Boom" "The Old Mount's A-Moverin'"
29	"The Big Blast" "A Many Splintered Thing"
30	"The Steal Hour" "A Snitch in Time"
31	"Verse Without Werse" "Crime Without Rhyme"
32	"Truckdrivers in the Sky" "Follow the Fleet"
33	"The Squirrel Next Door" "High Neighbor"
34	"The Spell Binders (verbalized by the announcer as "The Spell Bounders")" "Hex Marks the Spot"
35	"Battle of the Giants" "It Takes Two to Tangle"
36	"Bye-Bye, Boris" "Farewell, My Ugly"

=== Metal-Munching Mice ===
A legion of six-foot robot mice descend upon Earth and devour television reception antennas.

Chapter	Title
1	"Metal-Munching Mice"
2	"Bullwinkle Bites Back" "Nothing but the Tooth"
3	"Knock on Wood" "Bullwinkle Takes the Rap"
4	"A Knock for the Rock" "The Lamp Is Low"
5	"Window Pains" "The Moosetrap"
6	"Doorway to Danger" "Doom in the Room"
7	"Boris Makes His Move" "The Miceman Cometh"
8	"Big Cheese Boris" "I'd Rather Be Rat"
9	"The Space Rat" "Of Mice and Menace"
Note: Rocky and Bullwinkle announce the next episode title when the narrator was surprised and worried when seeing a space shuttle.
10	"The Shot Heard Round the World" "First National Bang"
11	"The Rat-Pack Attacks" "Sharrup You Mouse"
Note: Boris announces the next episode's title when the metal-munching moon mice are coming right at Rocky, Bullwinkle, Gidney, and Cloyd.
12	"Bucks for Boris" "Rocky Pays the Piper"
13	"Fright Flight" "A Rocky to the Moon"
14	"Bullwinkle Bellows Again" "Moonin' Low"
15	"Bongo Boris" "The Hep Rat"
Note: The Narrator says "The Hep Cat" before Boris corrects him and takes a balalaika and sings a short song at the end.
16	"The Spies of Life" "When a Fella Needs a Fiend"

=== Greenpernt Oogle ===
The Brooklyn-accented ruler of a South Pacific island kidnaps Bullwinkle after the island's dominant bird disappears.

Chapter	Title
1	"Greenpernt Oogle"
2	"The Mail Animal" "Bullwinkle Stamps His Foot"
3	"Burgled Bullwinkle" "The Moose Nappers"
4	"A Crown for Bullwinkle" "Monarch Moose"
5	"Squirrel in the Scope" "Ring Around the Rocky"
6	"Block Party" "The Happy Headsman"
7	"The Wizard Biz" "Bullwinkle Lays an Egg"
8	"Riptide Rocky" "Drips Adrift"
9	"Blood and Sand" "Three for the Show"
10	"Bullwinkle's Landing" "Moosle Beach"
11	"The Sand Blasters" "Big Bang on the Beach"
12	"The Brave and the Boulder" "To Each His Stone"

=== Rue Britannia ===
Boris is hired by three greedy brothers in London after their uncle bequeaths his mansion to Bullwinkle.

Chapter	Title
1	"Rue Britannia"
2	"Earl and Water Don't Mix" "Next Time, Take the Drain"
3	"Moose Gets the Juice" "Mourning Becomes Electra-cuted"
4	"Episode 120" "123"
5	"Explosive Situation" "Don't Make it Worse—It's Badenov"
6	"You've Got Me in Stitches" "Suture Self"
7	"Fifty Cents Lost" "Get That Halfback"
8	"The Scheme Misfires" "You Can Planet Better than That"

=== Buried Treasure ===
An eccentric rich man offers a prize in a treasure hunt for a pot full of Confederate money. Meanwhile, Boris masquerades as a John Dillinger-esque gangster and uses his new hirelings to rob Frostbite Falls' bank.

Chapter	Title
1	"Buried Treasure"
2	"A Tisket a Casket" "The Bury Box"
3	"The Bank Busters" "The Great Vaults"
Note: The camera zooms inside an angry Boris Badenov's mouth and the Narrator screams into it.
4	"Sweet Violence" "The Yegg and I"
5	"Many a Thousand Gone" "The Haul of Fame"
6	"Down to Earth" "Me and My Shatter"
7	"Hop Skip and Junk" "Bullwinkle's Big Tow"
8	"Bucks for Boris" "The Green Paper Caper"
9	"When Moose Meets Moose" "Two's a Crowd"
10	"The Midnight Chew-Chew" "This Gum for Hire"
11	"Boris Badenov and His Friends?"
12	"Bars of Steal" "The Hard Cell"
13	"Subway Finish" "An Underground Round"
14	"The Last Edition" "Five-Scar Final"

=== The Last Angry Moose ===
Bullwinkle, unimpressed by the acting talents of movie star March Marlow, is convinced he is a better actor and commissions a disguised Boris to make him a star—becoming an unintentional comic superstar.

Chapter	Title
1	"Last Angry Moose"
2	"A Punch in the Snoot" "The Nose Tattoo"
3	"Fun on the Freeway" "The Quick and the Dead"
4	"Bullwinkle Makes a Movie" "The Feature from Outer Space"

=== Wailing Whale ===
The maritime industry lives in terror of Maybe Dick, a giant ship-eating whale. Shipping magnate Pericles Parnassus hires Rocky, Bullwinkle, and Captain Peachfuzz to hunt for the whale, which is in fact a pirate ship built by Boris Badenov.

Chapter	Title
1	"Wailing Whale"
2	"Vagabond Voyage" "The Castoffs Cast Off"
3	"Fear on the Pier" "What's up Dock?"
4	"TNT for Two" "Fright Cargo"
5	"Underwater Eyeball" "The Deep Blue See"
6	"Underwater Moose" "The Aqua-lunk"
7	"Terror on the Seas" "We've Only Begun to Fright"
8	"Blank Night" "The Age of Nothing"
9	"Defective Story" "A Muffled Report"
10	"Leaky Lyrics" "Bullwinkle Plugs a Song"
11	"Follow the Swallow" "The Inside Story"
12	"Playtime for Rollo" "Rest in Pieces"
13	"A Whale of a Tale" "Thar She Blows Up"
14	"Fast and Moose" "Charley's Antlers"

== Season 3 (1961–62) ==
Season 3 contained 33 episodes and 165 segments.

=== The Three Moosketeers ===
Bullwinkle's skills with Shish kebob lead him and Rocky to be hired by Athos, the sole surviving Musketeer. Bullwinkle takes on the name Aramoose, Rocky becomes Porthole, and they go to liberate the neo-medievalist kingdom of Applesauce-Lorraine from the usurping tyrant François Villain.

Chapter	Title
1	"Three Moosketeers"
2	"Foiled Again" "Don't Fence Me In"
3	"Squeeze Play" "Glad We Could Get Together"
4	"Just Desserts" "Operator, We've Been Cut Off"
5	"Severed Relations" "How to Get a Head"
6	"That's the Way the Cookie Crumbles" "Me and My Chateau"
7	"A Raw Deal" "Two Aces and a Pair of Kings"
8	"Rocky Draws the Line" "Who Got My Ruler"

=== Lazy Jay Ranch ===
Rocky and Bullwinkle buy a suffering dude ranch that raises worms. Meanwhile, Boris and Natasha are trying to get rid of them so they can gain the mineral rights to the ranch.

Chapter	Title
1	"Lazy Jay Ranch"
2	"Fast and Moose" "The Quick and the Dead"
3	"Buzzard Bait" "The Carrion Call"
4	"Rocky Rides Again" "Small in the Saddle"
5	"The Last Angry Angus" "Hot Scotch"
6	"Our Town" "Home of the Grave"
7	"The Big Countdown" "Tally in Our Alley"
8	"Aches and Plains" "The Old Chisel ‘Em Trail"
9	"Bucket-Headed Bullwinkle" "Pail-Face Moose"
10	"Make-Believe Monster" "Once Upon a Crime"
11	"Chew Chew Baby" "Stick to Your Gums"
12	"Rain of Terror" "The Desperate Showers"
13	"The Lightning Bugs" "Nuts and Volts"
14	"The Bush Pusher" "Beri Beri Whose Got the Berry?"
15	"Underwater Trap" "No Air in the Snare"
16	"Boris Bounces Back" "The Rubber Heel"
17	"Boris Takes a Town" "The Night Mayor"
18	"Just Boris and Me" "The Yegg and I"

=== Missouri Mish Mash ===
Rocky & Bullwinkle, Boris, Natasha, and Fearless Leader, and the Moonmen all become involved in the hunt for the powerful Kirward Derby, a magical hat that bestows great wisdom.

Chapter	Title
1	"Missouri Mish Mash"
2	"Landslide on the Rails" "Bullwinkle Covers His Tracks"
3	"Rocky and the Rock" "Taken for Granite"
4	"Trouble Upstairs" "Bats in the Boris"
5	"Boris on a Broomstick" "The Flying Sorcerer"
6	"Boris Lends a Hand" "Count Your Fingers"
7	"Mud-Munching Moose" "Bullwinkle Bites the Dust"
8	"Devil Dan Thinks It Over" "Feud for Thought"
9	"Calling Fearless Leader" "Whistle for the Missile"
10	"Rocky Takes the High Road" "Missile in the Thistle"
11	"Dollars and Scents" "Putting on the Dog"
12	"One of Our Meese Is Missing" "Heads You Lose"
13	"Bullwinkle Makes His Bid" "Going! Going! Gun!"
14	"The Vanishing American" "No Moose Is Good Moose"
15	"Hello, Ma Booby" "Pleased to Beat Ya"
16	"Under Bullwinkle's Bowler" "The Wide, Open Spaces"
17	"Million Dollar Carton" "Jack in the Box"
18	"Two at One Blow" "The Double Beheader"
19	"Flower in the Hat" "The Rose Bowler"
20	"A Snitch in Time" "The Finking Man's Thilter"
21	"Boomerang Bowler" "Boris Makes a Comeback"
22	"All in Fever Say Aye" "The Emotion Is Carried"
23	"Too Much Too Moon" "What Makes Lunatick?"
24	"Flying Bullets" "A Cartridge in a Pear Tree"
25	"The Crepe Hangers" "Brighten the Coroner Where You Are"
26	"Double Trouble" "Two's a Crowd"

=== Topsy Turvy World ===
Boris causes the Earth to tilt so that the South Pole is switched to the Pacific.

Chapter	Title
1	"Topsy Turvy World"
2	"Funny Business in the Books" "The Library Card"
3	"Topsy Turvy Time" "Emit Yvrut Yspot"
4	"Bullwinkle Takes the Wheel" "The Bum Steer"
5	"The Ocean Waves" "Hi, Divers"
6	"Untitled Episode"
Note: The Narrator falls asleep before telling the name of the next episode.
7	"Six O'Clock Low" "Bullwinkle Gets the Point"
8	"Boris Goes for Broke" "A Fiend in Need Is a Fiend...Indeed,"
9	"The Fright Before Christmas" "A Visit from Saint Nicholouse"
10	"Soups On" "Rocky Goes to Pot"
11	"Snowbank Squirrel" "Bullwinkle Gets the Drift"
12	"Claus and Effect" "Yule...Be Sorry"
13	"Boom at the Top" "The Angry Young Moose"
14	"Fur, Fur Away" "Hair Today, Gone Tomorrow"

== Season 4 (1962–63) ==
Season 4 contained 19 episodes and 95 segments, the least out of all five seasons.

=== Painting Theft ===
Boris and Natasha rob a museum in Paris and hide their paintings on Bullwinkle's farm, until Bullwinkle splatters whitewash on the paintings and finds he can sell them to snooty art collectors.

Chapter	Title
1	"Painting Theft"
2	"Transatlantic Chicken" "Hens Across the Sea"
3	"Portrait of a Moose" "Bullwinkle Gets the Brush"
4	"Bullwinkle Busts a Brush" "The Cleft Palette"
5	"Boris Badenov Presents" "The 20-Inch Scream"
6	"Dollars to Doughnuts" "The Wonderful World of Cruller"

=== The Guns of Abalone ===
Boris and Natasha lay siege to the world via powerful cannon left behind on Abalone Island, 18 years after they were silenced in World War II.

Chapter	Title
1	"Guns of Abalone"
2	"Falling Stars" "Only a Plumber Should Plummet"
3	"I'm out of Bullets" "Pour Me Another Shot"
4	"Seasick Bullwinkle" "How Green Was My Moose"

=== The Treasure of Monte Zoom ===
Boris goes after a treasure hidden in a Minnesota lake.

Chapter	Title
1	"Treasure of Monte Zoom"
2	"Flood Waters" "Drown in the Valley"
3	"A Leak in the Lake" "The Drain Maker"
4	"Bullwinkle Cleans Up" "The Desperate Showers"
5	"Boris Bashes a Box" "The Flat Chest"
6	"One, Two, Three, Gone" "I've Got Plenty of Nothing"
7	"All That Glitters" "Baby, It's Gold Outside"
8	"Boris Wheels and Deals" "A Profit Without Honor"

=== Goof Gas Attack ===
Pottsylvania has developed a nerve gas that renders intelligent people helplessly foolish but doesn't affect Bullwinkle.

Chapter	Title
1	"Goof Gas Attack"
2	"The Brain Drainers" "Malice in Wonderland"
3	"The Deadheads" "Feeling Zero"
4	"Three to Go" "Crash on Delivery"
5	"McKeesport on the Prod" "The Pennsylvania Poker"
6	"Hare-Brained Boris" "The Dumb Bunny"
7	"Next Time-Gee!" "(Untitled Episode)"
Note: Boris zapped the Narrator with Goof Gas before he could tell the name of the next episode.
8	"5–4–3–2–1" "The Quick Launch Counter"

=== Banana Formula ===
Running out of ideas, Boris and Natasha stumble upon a new sound-suppressed explosive named "Hush-a-Boom", but lose the formula when they foolishly inscribe it on a banana that Bullwinkle promptly devours.

Chapter	Title
1	"Banana Formula"
2	"Boom Town" "Destination Schwartz"
3	"The Flat of the Land" "A Rolling Stone Gathers No Moose"
4	"Mack the Knife" "Operation: Moose"
5	"Two Days to Doom" "The Last Weekend"
6	"Two Moose Is Loose" "Which One Has the Phoney"
7	"The Moose and the Monster" "Nothing but the Pest"
8	"Testing 1, 2, 3" "Tape a Number"
9	"The Villain's Victory Dance" "The Jig Is Up"
Note: Fearless Leader announced the next episode's title, because the Feds bound and gagged the Narrator.
10	"The Missing Moustache" "Hair Today, Gone Tomorrow"
11	"Boom at the Top" "Bullwinkle Loses His Head"
12	"Boris Talks to Himself" "Mockingbird Heel"
Note: Boris announced the next episode's title by impersonating the Narrator.

== Season 5 (1963–64) ==
Season 5 contained 33 episodes and 165 segments, similar to season 3.

=== Bumbling Brothers Circus ===
The two join a travelling circus, with Bullwinkle as a lion tamer and Rocky as an elephant trainer. This sparks the ire of Boris (the previous lion tamer) who tries to ruin their acts.

Chapter	Title
1	"Bumbling Brothers Circus"
2	"Lion in the Bedroom" "The Cat's Pajamas"
3	"A Red Letter Day" "Drop Us a Lion"
4	"The Fire-Eaters" "Hot Lips"
5	"The Show Must Go On" "Give ‘Em the Acts"
6	"Looney Lightning" "Nuts and Volts"
7	"The Fire Chaser" "Bullwinkle Goes to Blazes"
8	"Flaming Arrows" "Bullwinkle Meets His Match"
Note: Rocky & Bullwinkle announced the next episode's title, as the Narrator was giggling at the word "arrowing".
9	"It's in the Bag" "Rocky Gets the Sack"
10	"A Short Weight for All Seats" "One of Our Trunks Is Missing"

=== Mucho Loma ===
The sleepy Spanish town of Mucho Loma is being terrorized by Zero, a loudmouth minstrel turned nighttime nuisance. After accidentally driving through a building, Rocky and Bullwinkle are tasked with capturing him.

Chapter	Title
1	"Mucho Loma"
2	"The Boys Bounce Back" "Springtime in the Rocky"
3	"Rock Meets Rock" "Thud and Blunder"
4	"A Watery Grave" "Drown Among the Sheltering Palms"
5	"The Unsatisfied Costumer" "Why Not Try Brand X"
6	"The Inferior Decorators" "The Walleyed Moose"

=== Pottsylvania Creeper ===
Fearless Leader enters a man-eating plant in a Frostbite Falls flower contest and the plant spreads vast amounts of seeds that grow into an army of man-eating plants.

Chapter	Title
1	"Pottsylvania Creeper"
2	"Four for the Show" "Two Pairs of Plants"
3	"Beaned by a Blossom" "The Petal Pushers"
4	"Vacation Daze" "Visit to a Small Panic"
Note: Fearless Leader says the next episode's title when he appears on the show.
5	"The Worryin' of the Green" "The Look of the Irish"
6	"It's Only a Flesh Wound" "Better Lead than Dead"

=== Moosylvania ===
Bullwinkle discovers the lost state of Moosylvania and goes to Washington DC to campaign for the land's inclusion in the US.

Chapter	Title
1	"Moosylvania"
2	"Blast-Off Spedia with Encyclopedia" "Off to Heaven with Volume Seven"
3	"Resign Your Fate to a 52nd State" "Moosylvania Mania!"
4	"Bad Day at Flat Rocky" "A Record in Bullwinkle's Blot"

=== The Ruby Yacht ===
An Indian ruler seeks a boat encrusted with valuable jewels that Bullwinkle finds in a lake.

Chapter	Title
1	"Ruby Yacht"
2	"Let's Drink to the Ruby" "Stoned Again"
3	"Rimski and Korsakoff Go to Palm Springs" "Song of Indio"
4	"The Malady Lingers On" "I Bought You Violence for Your Furs"
5	"The Deep Six" "It's Tough to Fathom"
6	"The New Delhi-catessen" "Judgment at Bloombergs"

=== Bullwinkle's Testimonial Dinner ===
Bullwinkle's attempt to get his expensive suit cleaned for a dinner in his honor becomes a chase to a Chinese laundrette that fronts for illegal activities by Boris and Natasha.

Chapter	Title
1	"Bullwinkle's Testimonial Dinner"
2	"Hello, Orient" "That's Some Dandy-Looking China You Have There"
3	"Let's Blow up New York" "We Bombed ‘Em at the Palace"
4	"Exploding Population" "Pull Yourself Together"
5	"Up the River" "Yangtze with the Laughing Face"
6	"The Bomb in the Cellar" "Bullwinkle Lowers The Boom"

=== The Weather Lady ===
A fortune telling machine in the form of a lady is used by Boris and Natasha for an illegal gambling boat.

Chapter	Title
1	"Weather Lady"
2	"The Rolling Stone" "Look Ma, No Moss"
3	"A Southern-Style Breakfast" "Hominy Grits Can You Eat?"
4	"Bartender, Turn Those Lights Off" "A Shot in the Dark"
5	"Duel Controls" "Put It in Second"
6	"They Didn't Pick up Our Option" "Show Down"

=== Louse on 92nd Street ===
Bullwinkle witnesses a known gangster commit a crime and now must be guarded lest Boris, a fanatical admirer of the gangster, eliminate him.

Chapter	Title
1	"Louse on 92nd Street"
2	"Bullwinkle Sneaks a Peek" "There's Room in the River"
3	"The Half Shot Moose" "Testify My Eye"
4	"Whatever Happened to Joel Kupperman?" "Get That Quiz Kid"
5	"Doing the Big Apple" "May I Have the Next Dunce?"
6	"The Act Is Over" "The Big Mink Is the Fink"

=== Wossamotta U ===
A forlorn college football team discovers Bullwinkle's unstoppable abilities as a passer and it quickly swells into undefeated success and superstardom, drawing out sports gamblers Boris and Natasha as well as a Southern Revanchist.

This episode is full of numerous editing errors and inconsistencies. Most notably, Wossamotta is spelled inconsistently on screen, and the scoreboard rarely shows the correct score during the final game against Mud City. As well, when the final touchdown is made and Rocky declares, "Wossamotta wins!", compiling the scoring that had already been accounted for, Bullwinkle's last-second touchdown actually wouldn't have scored enough points for Wossamotta to have won the game.

Chapter	Title
1	"Wossamotta U"
2	"A College for Two" "Rock Enrolls"
3	"The Hidden Ball Play" "Goal Is Where You Find It"
4	"Wager at Dawn" "Early to Bet"
5	"Standing Room Only" "Bullwinkle Sells Out"
6	"Bullwinkle Scores Again" "Fool's Goal"
7	"Rogue's Gallery" "Hold That Line-Up"
8	"Male Bags" "Homely Are the Brave"
9	"Mine Eyes Have Seen the Gory" "Moose's in the Col' Col' Ground"
10	"Bullwinkle's Battle Plan" "Civil Defense"
Note: the Southern revanchist spoils the Narrator's closing.
11	"Bullwinkle Buys a Fence" "Pickets Charge"
12	"A Rock for Rock" "To Each His Stone"

=== Moosylvania Saved ===
To draw needed resources for Pottsylvania, Fearless Leader tricks Bullwinkle and Rocky into getting foreign aid to Moosylvania he intends Boris and Natasha to steal.

Chapter	Title
1	"Moosylvania Saved"
2	"Untitled Episode"
Note: The Narrator wasn't able to announce the title in time because he asked too many questions, which made Advicafax say "Stop asking questions, loud mouth! The episode's over!"
3	"Untitled Episode"
Note: The Narrator said to tune in to the next episode when the audience will hear Rocky say "Hokey Smoke!", but Rocky sank before he could say it; however, he managed to use a sign to do it.
4	"Moosylvania Mish Mash" "A State of Confusion"

== Short film (2014) ==
A Rocky and Bullwinkle short titled Rocky and Bullwinkle also known as Another Fine Moose You've Gotten Me Into or The Man In The Iron Moose, made by DreamWorks Animation and directed by Gary Trousdale, was to be shown in theaters before Mr. Peabody & Sherman, which opened on March 7, 2014. This plan was dropped, but the short was later released with the film on Blu-ray 3D.

== Notes ==
There is conflict between several online sources regarding the division of the story arcs into seasons. The breakdown presented here is based on the following references:

- The Complete Season 1 DVD set begins with Jet Fuel Formula and concludes with Box Top Robbery.
- Season 2 begins with Upsidaisium. The Complete Season 2 DVD set contains 52 episodes (or 260 segments), which would run through Wailing Whale.
- Season 3 begins with The Three Moosketeers. This is confirmed in Keith Scott's The Moose that Roared. The Complete Season 3 DVD set contains four story arcs.
- Season 4 begins with Painting Theft.
- According to Keith Scott, Season 5 (as well as a new numbering system for the episodes) began with Bumbling Brothers Circus.

The DVD sets and Keith Scott's book have been assembled with the participation of Jay Ward's family and of the current incarnation of Jay Ward Productions and are believed to be authoritative.
