= Bullwinkle's Entertainment =

American family entertainment center chain

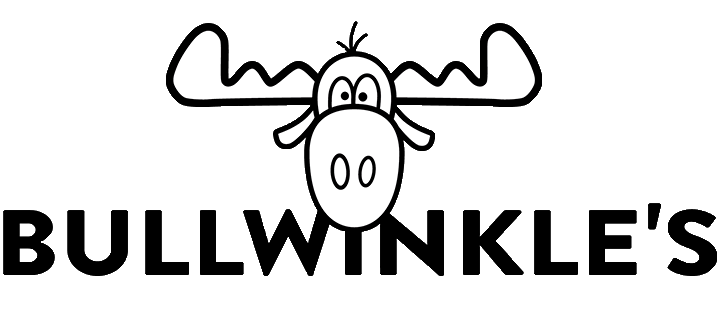
- Logo used since 2019
- Formerly: Family Fun Centers & Bullwinkle's Restaurant; Bullwinkle's Family Restaurant; Bullwinkle's International
- Industry: Pizzeria, Restaurant, Family entertainment center
- Predecessor: Bullwinkle's Family Food N' Fun Restaurant (1982-1991); Huish Family Fun Centers (1972-1999) Upland, Tukwila, Willsonville Bullwinkles current
- Founded: June 14, 1982; 44 years ago Santa Clara, California, United States
- Founder: David L. Brown
- Headquarters: Tukwila, Washington, U.S.
- Number of locations: 3 (2025)
- Area served: California, Oregon, Washington
- Key people: John & Jim Huish (Huish Family Fun Centers)
- Services: Arcade games Birthday parties Bowling; Kart racing Miniature golf Batting cages Bumper boats Laser tag Animatronic shows (formerly)
- Website: https://bullwinkles.com/

Bullwinkle's Entertainment, previously known as Family Fun Centers & Bullwinkle's Restaurant and formerly Bullwinkle's Family Food n' Fun is a chain of family entertainment centers. Locations feature a sit-down restaurant, complemented by arcade games, go-karts, bumper boats, mini golf, laser tag, and small rides for children. Games and activities are generally themed around the company's namesake, The Rocky and Bullwinkle Show.

== History ==
=== Bullwinkle's Family Food N' Fun ===
In 1979, David L. Brown obtained licensing rights to use intellectual properties from the Jay Ward Productions and Total Television catalog under the company "Real Characters Inc." Brown's first project involving IPs from these two studios came in the form of "The Bullwinkle Show" and "Bullwinkle's Call of the Wild Show". They were two live stage productions featuring the characters of Bullwinkle J. Moose, Rocky the Flying Squirrel, and Underdog (first and second shows), along with Snidley Whiplash and Moonbeam, an original character created for this production to serve as Bullwinkle's girlfriend (second show only). These live stage productions toured across several venues in North America, including the Lagoon Amusement Park and Playland Amusement Park, between 1980 and 1981. Following the success of these costumed live tours, Brown began conceptualizing another endeavor involving the iconic characters.

Bullwinkle's Family Food N' Fun Restaurant, meant to capitalize on the success of Chuck E. Cheese's Pizza Time Theatre and ShowBiz Pizza Place, opened its first location in Santa Clara, California on June 14, 1982. Similar to its competition, the restaurant offered a variety of electronic games and rides, food items, merchandise, and an animatronic show as its flagship attraction. The Fantasy Fountain Show, a series of water and lighting effects set to popular music, served as an alternative attraction in the main showroom during intermissions for the animatronics. During early development, Dave Brown discussed with Nolan Bushnell (founder of Pizza Time Theatre) the prospect of manufacturing animatronics for Bullwinkle's, as a cousin of Bushnell's was a co-owner of Real Characters Inc. However, this offer, as well as another involving Creative Engineering to manufacture Bullwinkle animatronics as revealed by founder Aaron Fechter himself (who created ShowBiz Pizza's Rock-afire Explosion band), both fell through.

The characters present in the Real Characters Inc. stage productions returned for the restaurant's "Moosetronic" experiences (except Moonbeam), in addition to Dudley Do-Right, Boris Badenov, Natasha Fatale, Tooter Turtle, Hoppity Hooper, Tennessee Tuxedo, and Chumley. A key detail from the aforementioned touring shows was that none of the original cartoon voice actors reprised their roles for their respective characters. In the case of the "Bullwinkle Show" production, Scott Wilson (who was best known for voicing the Chuck E. Cheese and Mr. Munch characters) voiced Bullwinkle, Rocky, and Underdog entirely. Fred Hope, owner of The Only Animated Display & Design Company, personally requested the return of the original voice actors from the cartoons. Of the voice talent involved, June Foray and Bill Scott reprised their roles as Rocky and Natasha, as well as Bullwinkle and Dudley Do-Right, respectively. Because Wally Cox died from a heart attack in 1973, Bill Scott also voiced Underdog. Corey Burton provided voice lines for Snidely Whiplash, as Hans Conried also died from a heart attack just five months before the opening of Bullwinkle's. Don Adams, Bradley Bolke, and Paul Frees did not reprise their roles as Tennessee Tuxedo, Chumley, and Boris respectively for unknown reasons. Instead, these roles were taken up by other actors, including Dave Stamey (Tennessee) and John Swanson (both Chumley and Boris). Joe Alaskey voiced Boris for "A-Show" segments produced after the initial batch used in the Santa Clara prototype, whilst Frank Welker allegedly took on the role solely for "B-Show" announcement skits promoting the Fantasy Fountain Shows.

The lyrics and music for the animatronic segments were produced by composer Bill Broughton. Broughton personally released several of the original songs he produced for these segments through the Happy Songs, Happy Kids! and Famoose Moose's Greatest Hits...and Misses! albums in his later years. Scott Hennessy initially wrote dialogue scripts for the earliest segments, and Fred Hope also wrote song lyrics. However, they were both succeeded by Broughton after their involvement with Bullwinkle's ended by 1983.

Following the opening of Santa Clara, some changes were made to streamline the restaurant experience going forward. AVG Technologies would succeed The Only Animated Display & Design Company as the manufacturer for Bullwinkle's animatronic shows from 1983 up through the early 1990s. To cut down on installation costs, several characters saw a slight decrease in mechanical movements, with Tennessee Tuxedo and Chumley being phased out from the show entirely. A majority of aspects present in Santa Clara's store design were adapted for future locations. The original animatronic prototypes at Santa Clara were immediately replaced by the standardized figures from AVG once the store model was streamlined.

=== 1991 Family Fun Centers & Bullwinkle's Restaurant merger ===
Beginning in 1983, the Huish Family Fun Centers gained a license for franchised Bullwinkle's locations, these being relegated to the restaurant portions of the fun centers instead of stand-alone locations. A condensed animatronic show featuring Rocky, Bullwinkle, Boris, and Natasha (with one location even including Tooter Turtle as well) was constructed for these smaller integrations by AVG. Fantasy Fountain Shows were also part of these smaller shows (but were removed in later years). By 1991, the Huish family purchased the entirety of Bullwinkle's to merge its operations with their Family Fun Centers. From 1992 to 1999, new Bullwinkle's locations (named Bullwinkle's Family Restaurants after the merger) opened within the Huish Family Fun Centers in California, Oregon, and Washington state.

Some time after 1993, the restaurants introduced the WYME TV broadcasting feed of television screens. These utilized all-new 2D animated skits (provided by DNA Productions) in conjunction with showings of original Rocky & Bullwinkle cartoons, screening alongside the animatronic and fountain shows. The project was spearheaded by Scott Wilson, who had been laid off by Showbiz Pizza Time, Inc. management in 1993. Wilson also took on the voice role for Bullwinkle once again, as well as Dudley Do-Right, for the animated skits. By the late 1990s, these feeds also incorporated contemporary music videos as intermissions for both Moosetronics and Fantasy Fountain segments.

=== Northwoods, Boomers! Parks, and reorganization ===
In 1998, a new store model known as the "Northwoods" design debuted at the now-defunct Bullwinkle's location in Myrtle Beach, South Carolina. Two more locations in Medford, New York, and Cary, North Carolina, opened in 1999 and 2000, respectively. Although there were a few permanent store closures throughout the early 1990s, Huish Family Fun Centers sold the Anaheim, El Cajon, Escondido, Fountain Valley, San Diego, and Upland Family Fun Centers (all of which also included Bullwinkle's Restaurants within them) plus the stand-alone Medford Bullwinkle's to Palace Entertainment, which is now owned by Herschend Family Entertainment. Huish Family Fun Centers moved to the Pacific Northwest and opened a park in Tukwila, Washington and Willsonville, Oregon with partners from ABC batting cages. Palace rebranded them each to the Boomers! Parks brand. With the exception of Medford, all of the former Family Fun Centers immediately removed their Bullwinkle's theming and animatronics, with only the structural remains intact (the former Vista location houses a Johnny Rockets dining space in place of the former Bullwinkle's section). More stores closed later on, including Myrtle Beach in 2007 and Cary by 2010.

Funtasia, a family entertainment center in Edmonds, Washington that had opened in 1991, closed in May 2010 and was swiftly acquired by the Huish family that same year. On February 18, 2011, the venue reopened as the Edmonds Family Fun Center. Unlike the previous locations, the Bullwinkle theming was reduced to decorative trees around the dining room, along with appearances by costumed versions of Rocky and Bullwinkle themselves (fabricated by Dreamation, the final manufacturer for the "Moosetronics"), with no animatronic show present. In 2013, John and Jim Huish were inducted into the IAAPA Hall of Fame for the Huish Family Fun Centers. Jim's induction was posthumous, as he passed away in 1984, while John Huish eventually passed away in 2021.

=== Bullwinkle's Entertainment ===
To modernize the look and feel of the Family Fun Centers, the Huish family rebranded as "Bullwinkle's Entertainment", a sleek and simplistic approach to the restaurant design (see "Store Environment"). Wilsonville was the first to undergo this transformation, removing their AVG "B-Show" in Spring 2019. Various pieces of the disassembled animatronics, including pneumatic cylinders and character cosmetics, were sold on eBay by Wilsonville's technician.

Upon the COVID-19 pandemic in 2020, the Huish family permanently shuttered the Edmonds location. After abandonment, the property became the subject of three fires in 2021, 2024, and 2025. Meanwhile, in 2020, Apex Parks (owners of several Boomers! locations) had declared bankruptcy and sought to reorganize. After the reorganization failed, members of the Huish family reacquired the San Diego and Upland locations for complete renovations. Dyke Huish (Jim's son) together with Shane and Scott Huish (John's sons), repurchased the properties.

San Diego was the first to reopen in September 2020, simply named the "San Diego Family Fun Center" despite the Bullwinkle's Entertainment design it employed. However, due to financial strains of the pandemic, San Diego closed permanently once again on January 4, 2022. Upland reopened next in December 2021, with a western golf course being the first MGX immersive miniature golf of its type in the world, and axe throwing being introduced to the attraction count.

Tukwila, Washington, by this point virtually unmodified from its opening in August 1999, had only a glimpse of the Bullwinkle's Entertainment overhaul with the introduction of "Bowlwinkle Lanes", the first bowling alley implemented in a Huish Family Fun Center in 2016. In 2026, it was announced that Tukwila will also undergo the same renovations as Wilsonville, San Diego, and Upland. This entailed removing the last-remaining legacy fixtures, including the "Moosetronic" stage show on September 17th that year.

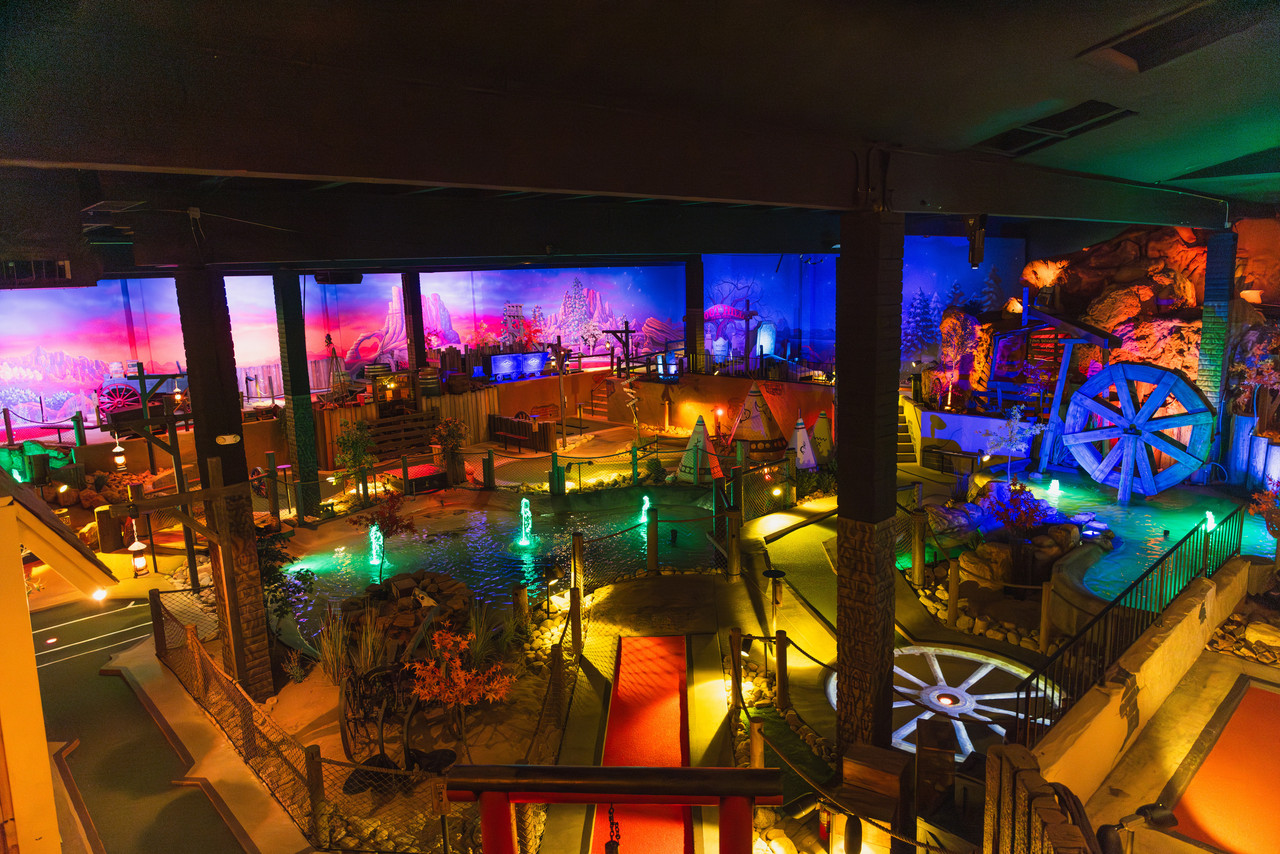
An MGX Western Immersive Miniature Golf Course at Bullwinkle's Upland.

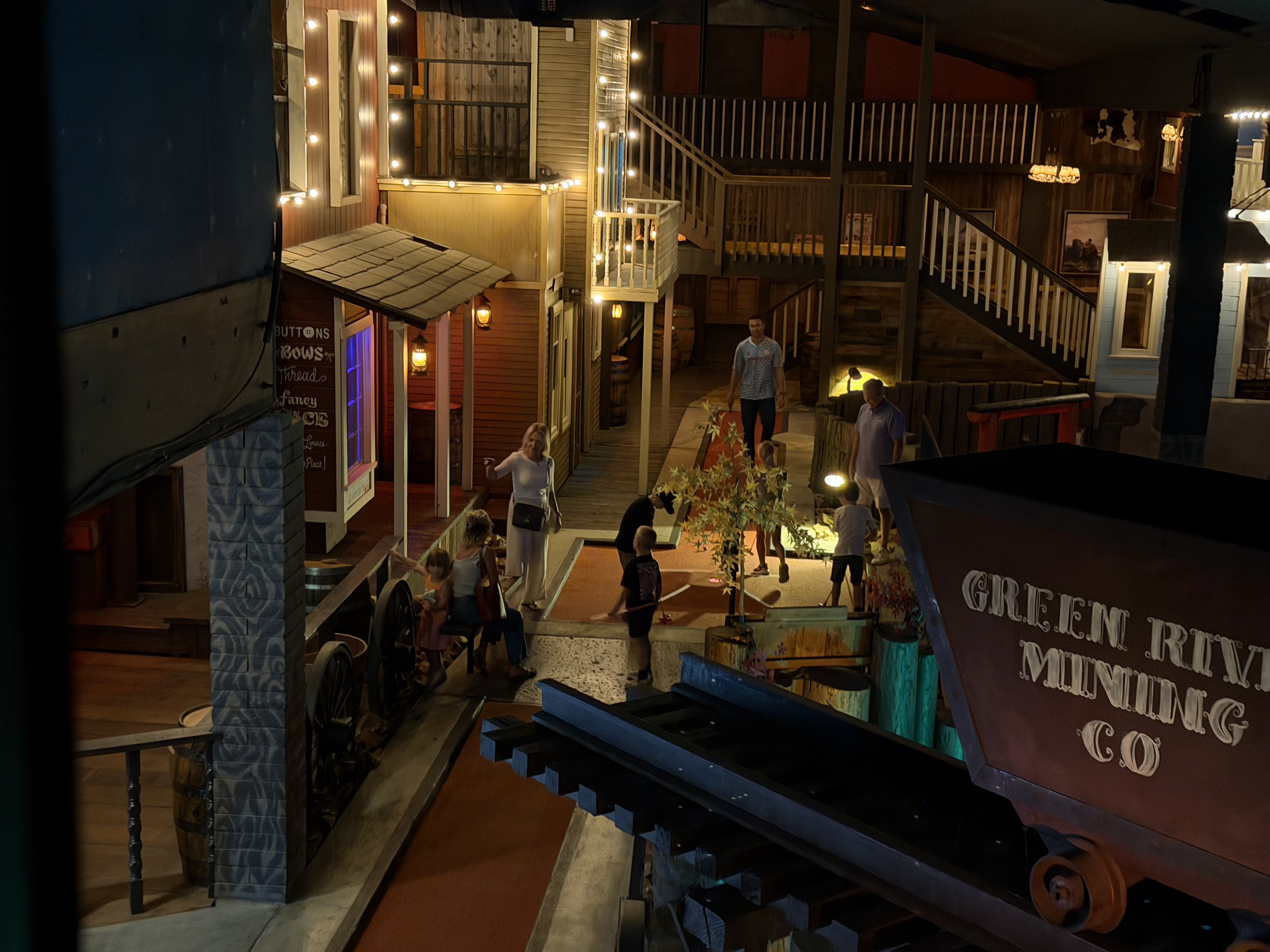
An MGX Western Immersive Miniature Golf Course at Bullwinkle's Upland.

== Entertainment ==
=== Video Arcade ===
"Underdog's Mighty Metropolis" was the former theming of Bullwinkle's arcades, set in a nighttime cityscape after the titular Underdog series of cartoons. Arcade video games and redemption games have always been a staple of Bullwinkle's past and present, with Skee-Ball being one of the most popular options. As with many family entertainment centers of its kind, Bullwinkle's tickets can be redeemed later for merchandise, like candy and toys. The Santa Clara pilot store also had a small arcade subsection named the "Upsidasium Mine," (after the third storyline in Rocky and Bullwinkle's original series) which contained an assortment of kiddie rides for younger guests. "The Improbable Picture Palace" was a photo booth spot featuring Mr. Hector Peabody from the Peabody's Improbable History segments of Rocky and Bullwinkle. After the 1991 merger with Huish Family Fun Centers, more attractions such as the Kidopolis indoor playground, Frog Hopper, Drop & Twist (Tukwila exclusive), laser tag, and XD Theater were gradually added to the roster. Starting in 2016 at Tukwila, bowling became the flagship attraction of the Bullwinkle's chain, and has been implemented in the three current locations by 2024. When the Huish family reacquired the Boomers! Upland location in 2021 and rebranded it to Bullwinkle's Entertainment, axe throwing was incorporated as an all-new attraction, exclusive to Upland.

=== Outdoor Attractions ===
As Bullwinkle's became part of Huish Family Fun Centers, locations are equipped with outdoor activities at individual upcharges. These commonly include go-kart tracks, miniature golf courses, bumper boats, and batting cages. The Wilsonville location exclusively has an 800 foot two-way zipline ride at a speed of 25 miles per hour, plus a "Sky Trail" ropes course.

=== Store Environment ===
The original exterior of stand-alone Bullwinkle's Family Food N' Fun restaurants are meant to emulate a Canadian Northwoods design, including character-themed totem poles. The theme of the main "Bullwinkle's Showroom" dining rooms revolved around a log cabin vibe inspired by the Dudley Do-Right cartoons, characterized by rustic lamps, "eye-catching" knick-knacks, and in-universe graffiti. Likewise, store employees were dressed as Canadian Mounties resembling that of Dudley. The Moosetronic animatronics and Fantasy Fountain Show were both located in this room with tiered "balcony" seating on the opposite wall. In the Santa Clara pilot store and likely some earlier stores, "Dudley's Den" offered a quieter dining experience compared to the main showroom. "Rocky's Trading Post" served as the restaurant's prize counter, selling merchandise of Jay Ward and Total Television characters, with some items exclusively made for the Bullwinkle's chain.

The 1998 "Northwoods" store design was constructed with more open spaces than the previous Bullwinkle's locations, furnished with 2D mountains and trees, wooden logs and planks, as well as an exterior with a "Frostbite Falls" water tower surrounded by a stone waterfall, supplied by Myrtle Beach-based Mozingo + Wallace Architects, LLC.

2019 saw a major renovation plan for the Huish Family Fun Centers, first implemented by Wilsonville, named "Bullwinkle's Entertainment." The new design philosophy, helmed by Embr. Creative, aimed for a minimalist 2010s style that combined motifs from Al Kilgore's 1962-1967 Bullwinkle comics. Very similarly to Chuck E. Cheese's 2017 remodel initiative at this time, the Bullwinkle's rebranding eliminated previous fixtures of the Family Fun Centers, including the animatronics.

=== Animatronics ===
Between 1983 and 2000, most "Moosetronic" stage shows consisted of Bullwinkle J. Moose (on banjo), Rocket "Rocky" J. Squirrel (on cello), Underdog (on saxophone), Dudley Do-Right (on the "Solar Symphonium" phonograph), as well as Boris and Natasha (typically depicted as wood-carvings on a totem pole above the center stage) in the main cast. Tooter Turtle (on drums) and Hoppity Hooper (on harmonica) were additional characters that mostly provided instrumentation during songs and rarely (in the case of Hoppity, not at all) spoke to the main cast. The original standardized arrangement with all of these characters was known as the "A-Show" on three stages, manufactured by AVG Technologies. Snidely Whiplash was a secondary animatronic located near the front of the restaurant instead of the main showroom within a themed jail cell named "Dudley Do-Right's Lock-up," programmed to short quips about lamenting his detainment situation and scheming revenge on Do-Right.

The final stage design with the "A-Show" cast was incorporated into the 1998 "Northwoods" store model, where all the characters (except for Tooter and Hoppity) were interspersed in a Mickey's Toontown-inspired atmosphere. Dudley Do-Right was appropriately placed inside a police station facade. Underdog was placed behind a set of doors meant to represent a billboard advertisement for Nell Fenwick's pies. Rocky and Bullwinkle were placed on a sliding platform that emerged behind large doors of a fire station, with Boris and Natasha above a projection screen marquee for the "moose club" (which played feeds of WYME TV skits, original Rocky and Bullwinkle cartoons, plus various contemporary music videos). This was also the final instance of the Fantasy Fountain Show's inclusion, as it would be phased out gradually along with (or before) the animatronic characters.

As more locations opened under the merged Family Fun Centers and Bullwinkle's Restaurants company, installations of this configuration decreased in favor of the "B-Show," which only included Rocky, Bullwinkle, Boris and Natasha (with Tooter Turtle appearing in the El Cajon installation of the "B-Show") on one stage. Three of these "B-Shows" consisted of pre-fabricated animatronics meant for the full "A-Show" configuration, leaving their corresponding Dudley Do-Rights and Underdogs left unused, even disassembled for spare parts. Initially, "B-Shows" did not perform any animatronic segments, and were only used to announce the Fantasy Fountain Shows or perform birthday songs. By the time WYME TV had been implemented, select songs from the "A-Show" that did not include or mention Dudley Do-Right, Underdog, Tooter Turtle, and Hoppity Hooper by name began to be used on the one-stage shows. The truncated setlist of songs for "B-Shows" continued to be used on the last operating Bullwinkle's animatronic stage in Tukwila, Washington (see below).

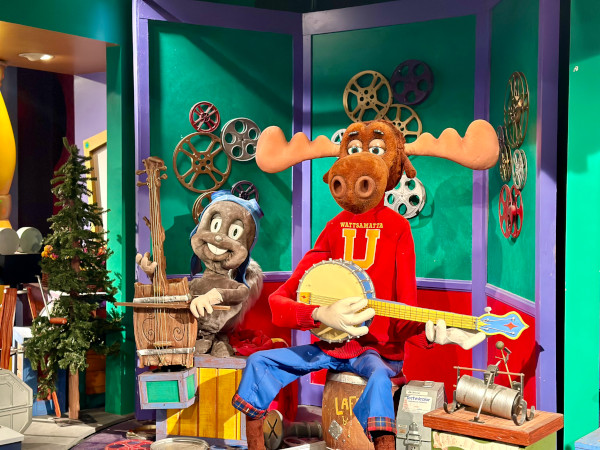
The last remaining Bullwinkle's "B-Show" (also known as a Turntable Stage) by Dreamation at the Tukwila, Washington location (2023)

The last new Bullwinkle's animatronic stage was created in 1999 for the Tukwila, Washington location. An updated take on the "B-Show" configuration, this stage is themed after a movie theater box office, decorated with authentic film reels and cases, and multicolored crates and barrels in the mix. Unlike the previous "B-Show" design, there is a revolving turntable that acts as a substitute for the stage curtains, rotating right 180 degrees to reveal Rocky and Bullwinkle behind the box office facade (which itself is adorned with posters advertising the two "stars" as the shuttered window reads "closed" in the center). Boris and Natasha, by this point, like the Northwoods configuration, were no longer wood-carvings stacked on top of each other and were instead presented side by side in their accurate colors from the cartoons. This was the only Moosetronic stage built without the Fantasy Fountain Show in mind. All the animatronics at Tukwila, along with the Rocky, Bullwinkle, Boris and Natasha animatronics used for the Northwoods installations, were provided by Dreamation of Yucca Valley, California (the Northwoods Dudley Do-Right and Underdog animatronics were AVG-built, recycled from defunct locations). Dreamation replicated the mechanical designs of AVG's Moosetronic incarnations but redesigned the cosmetics to be more fur and fiberglass-based. It was also at this time that Bullwinkle gained a Wossamotta U red sweater instead of an orange colored coat with tan cuffs. Since 2019, Tukwila's stage has become the only surviving animatronics left at a Bullwinkle's location, as Wilsonville, Oregon's stage (an AVG "B-Show" with a few added Dreamation cosmetics) was removed and disassembled to make way for the modern Bullwinkle's Entertainment remodel. In current times, Tukwila's animatronics appeared to only operate on a request basis instead of being automatically timed, a business decision that has similarly been made by Chuck E. Cheese's and their last remaining animatronic locations, likely as a means to reduce maintenance costs. Although it was originally believed that Tukwila would have kept their animatronics upon remodeling, the last public Bullwinkle's "Moosetronics" show was removed after September 17th, 2026, which by that point was already decommissioned and left as a temporary static display.

As of 2026, several animatronic characters from former Bullwinkle's locations have been preserved by fans in private collections. The prototype Hoppity Hooper from the Santa Clara, California store is in the possession of Kevin Grossman (known as "Pasq Animatronics" on YouTube and "pasqnotrook" on Instagram), albeit missing the harmonica and internal mechanisms. Kevin also owns a Dudley Do-Right animatronic from the defunct Federal Way, Washington store. The Dreamation Rocky and Bullwinkle animatronics from Medford, New York were rescued by SPC Animatronics. Dudley Do-Right and Underdog, as well as Boris and Natasha, all from the Medford location, are owned by Aidan (Animatronic Hub). Tommy (BedAndBreakfast), who uploaded previously lost Bullwinkle's animatronic segments between 2021 and 2024, has saved an AVG Snidely Whiplash animatronic, which replaced the original prototype in Santa Clara. A Bullwinkle animatronic from the Federal Way store is also in Tommy's possession. The Federal Way Hoppity Hooper, Tooter Turtle, and Underdog animatronics are currently owned by George Flanagan (Briar Patch Productions), with restoration work provided by RensterCEC and Caleb (Hounddog Productions). A Dreamation Bullwinkle animatronic from the Cary, North Carolina store is also owned by George, along with a spare Dudley Do-Right animatronic that was found in the storage room of Santa Clara, California's location left unused. When Tukwila's show was removed in September 2026, George rescued the complete animatronic characters and staging, with future plans to recreate the original Moosetronics "A-Show" arrangement featuring all the previously mentioned (by this point, retired) characters in his possession.

== Food ==
Menu items served at Bullwinkle's throughout the 1980s included "Bullwinkle's Famoose Pizza" (a deep-dish, double-crusted stuffed pizza), "Klondike Fried Chicken" (which had been a recurring item advertised in the Moosetronic segments, also inspiring Klondike Fried Chicken, a song performed by the animatronic characters), "Sweet Polly's Self-Serve Salad Sideboard" (a salad bar that additionally included salsa macaroni salad, fruit salad, and antipasto), "Dudley Do-Right's Done-Right Pizza" (traditional thin-crust pizza), and "Underdog's Heroic Sandwiches." There were also "Desserts with Character" offered, such as "Rocky's Road" and "Bullwinkle Mousse."

Modern-day Bullwinkle's locations have revamped menus with items that vary from location to location, with none of the pre-made items from the 1980s still available, aside from the "Motherlode" (which has been renamed to the Motherload) and the "Garden Cache" (which has been renamed to simply the Veggie) pizzas. The Upland, CA location received a new menu to tie in with their new renovations in 2025. Items exclusive to the Upland location include "The 'Bad Guy' Boris Burger", "Bullwinkle's Smokestack Burger", and "The Moose & Squirrel Classic".

== Locations ==
Operating Bullwinkle's Locations
Location	Address	Opening Date	Animatronics	Notes
Wilsonville, Oregon	29111 Town Center Loop W, Wilsonville, OR 97070	1994	AVG "B-Show" (1994-2019)	Renovated into Bullwinkle's Entertainment in 2019.
Tukwila, Washington	7300 Fun Center Way, Tukwila, WA 98188	August 1999	Dreamation "Box-Office B-Show" (1999-2026)	The last public Bullwinkle's "Moosetronics" show as of 2019 (the Wilsonville animatronics were removed and disassembled following that store's remodel). Although originally speculated to keep the "Moosetronics" following their remodel, Tukwila removed their show after September 17th, 2026.
Upland, California	1500 W 7th St, Upland, CA 91786	1972 (Huish Family Fun Center); 1983 (Bullwinkle's Family Food N' Fun); December 2021 (Bullwinkle's Entertainment)	AVG "A-Show" (1983-1997); AVG "B-Show" (1997-2001)	Originally opened in 1972 as one of the original Huish Family Fun Centers, with Bullwinkle's being added to the property in 1983. The Dudley Do-Right and Underdog animatronics were alleged to have been sent to the Myrtle Beach, South Carolina location in 1997, downgrading Upland's stage to a "B-Show" with only the center stage of characters present. Upland was one of many Huish Family Fun Centers sold to Palace Entertainment in 2001 and rebranded as a Boomers! Park. The Huish family bought back the Upland property, reopening it as Bullwinkle's Entertainment in December 2021. The venue was renovated with bowling lanes, laser tag, bumper cars, virtual reality, escape rooms, and more arcade games that officially debuted in 2025. The original interior was replaced in favor of a design that closely reflects the Wilsonville store. Despite this, the 1980s cabin exterior has mostly remained intact, but recolored to match the modern exterior design.

Defunct Bullwinkle's Locations
Location	Address	Opening Date	Closing Date	Animatronics	Notes
San Diego, California	6999 Clairemont Mesa Blvd, San Diego, CA 92111	1974 (Huish Family Fun Center); 1983 (Bullwinkle's Family Food N' Fun); 2001 (Boomers); September 2020 (San Diego Family Fun Center)	2001 (Huish Family Fun Center & Bullwinkle's Restaurant); June 8, 2020 (Boomers); January 4, 2022 (San Diego Family Fun Center)	AVG "B-Show" (1983-2001)	
Fountain Valley, California	16800 Magnolia St, Fountain Valley, CA 92708	1970s (Huish Family Fun Center); 1983 (Bullwinkle's Family Food N' Fun)	2001 (Huish Family Fun Center & Bullwinkle's Restaurant); June 8, 2020 (Boomers)	AVG "B-Show" (1983-2001)	
Santa Clara, California	777 Lawrence Expy, Santa Clara, CA 95051	June 14, 1982	1990s	"The Only Animated Display & Design Company" Prototype (1982-1983); AVG "A-Show" (1983-1990s)	The first Bullwinkle's Family Food N' Fun restaurant to open. As the pilot store, this housed the prototype "Moosetronics" show by The Only Animated Display & Design Company before it was updated with the finalized AVG Technologies "A-Show" shortly after. The location closed by the 1990s, with its space currently divided up between an Anjappar Chettinad Restaurant, AoPS Academy, and DaVita Dialysis.
Edmonton, Alberta, Canada	12910 Fort Rd NW, Edmonton, AB T5A 0W3, Canada	1983	August 1994	AVG "A-Show" (1983-1994)	One of the first to debut the standardized store model with an AVG Technologies "Moosetronics A-Show" and store elements adapted from the Santa Clara pilot. It was also the first franchised location in Canada. The location closed in August 1994 as a result of declining sales, with an auction held on October 1 that year. Since then, its space has been occupied by a PartSource auto parts store.
Richmond, Virginia	8006 W. Broad Street Road, Richmond, Virginia 23229	1983/1984	1990s	AVG "A-Show" (1983/84-1990s)	
Calgary, Alberta, Canada	9627 Macleod Trail, Calgary, AB T2J 0P6, Canada	May 19, 1984	1990	AVG "A-Show" (1984-1990)	The second franchise in Canada, following the same standardized store model as Edmonton, with an AVG Technologies "Moosetronics A-Show." The location closed by 1990 and was slightly renovated to become a Chuck E. Cheese's Pizza, which operated from 1991 to 1994. The building now houses a Schanks Sports Grill, which retains the original Bullwinkle's cabin exterior to this day.
Northridge, California	9400 Reseda Blvd, Northridge, CA 91324	1984	1990s	AVG "B-Show" (1984-1990s)	
Vista, California	1525 W Vista Way, Vista, CA 92083	June 1992 (Huish Family Fun Center & Bullwinkle's Restaurant); 2001 (Boomers)	2001 (Huish Family Fun Center & Bullwinkle's Restaurant)	AVG "B-Show" (1992-2001)	
El Cajon, California	1155 Graves Ave, El Cajon, CA 92021	November 1993 (Huish Family Fun Center & Bullwinkle's Restaurant); 2001 (Boomers)	2001 (Huish Family Fun Center & Bullwinkle's Restaurant); June 8, 2020 (Boomers)	AVG "B-Show" (1993-2001)	
Anaheim, California	1041 N. Shepard, Anaheim, CA 92806	1990s (Huish Family Fun Center & Bullwinkle's Restaurant); 2001 (Boomers)	2001 (Huish Family Fun Center & Bullwinkle's Restaurant); 2004 (Boomers)	AVG "B-Show" (1990s-2001)	
Escondido, California	830 Dan Way, Escondido, CA 92025	1990s (Huish Family Fun Center & Bullwinkle's Restaurant); 2001 (Boomers)	2001 (Huish Family Fun Center & Bullwinkle's Restaurant); 2004 (Boomers)	AVG "B-Show" (1990s-2001)	
Saudi Arabia	Al-Amir Mohammed Bin Abd Al-Aziz Street, Galleria Center, Jeddah	1990s	2000s	AVG "B-Show" (1990s-2000s)	
Myrtle Beach, South Carolina	1002 29th Ave N, Myrtle Beach, SC 29577	1998	2007	Dreamation "Northwoods A-Show" (1998-2007)	The first Bullwinkle's to adopt the "Northwoods" architecture by Mozingo + Wallace Architects, LLC. This show's Dudley Do-Right and Underdog were alleged to have originated from the Upland, California store. The location closed by 2007, with store signage and animatronics said to have been relocated to the Tukwila Family Fun Center shortly after. The building then housed Mykonos, a Greek restaurant named after the island, from 2010 to 2012. After abandonment for years, the building was finally converted into El Cerro Mexican Bar & Grill, which has continued to operate since 2018.
Medford, New York	655 Long Island Ave, Medford, NY 11763	May 1999 (Bullwinkle's Family Food N' Fun); 2001 (Boomers)	2001 (Bullwinkle's Family Food N' Fun); September 29, 2019 (Boomers)	Dreamation "Northwoods A-Show" (1999-2019)	This Bullwinkle's also adopted the "Northwoods" design, though it was a mirrored layout to Myrtle Beach's, contained a carousel inside the restaurant, and included an outdoor section with bumper boats, go-karts, a mini golf course, and other attractions. An incident where a mini swing ride tipped over, injuring 9 people, occurred in 2001, shortly before the location was sold to Palace Entertainment and rebranded as Boomers! Long Island. Despite the rebranding, the Bullwinkle's Northwoods theme remained, along with the "Moosetronics" show (speculated to have remained operational until the early 2010s). Boomers! Long Island closed for the season on September 29, 2019, and did not reopen the following year, due to the COVID-19 pandemic. The location's closure was silently made permanent, with several arcade games and amusement rides claimed to have been relocated elsewhere. The Bullwinkle's animatronic characters (and some "Northwoods" decor) were acquired in June 2021 by private collectors, with each restored to an operational status a year after the acquisitions.
Cary, North Carolina	1040 Buck Jones Rd, Raleigh, NC 27606	2000	2010	Dreamation "Northwoods A-Show" (2000-2010)	This Bullwinkle's location was the third and final location to adopt the Northwoods design. The location became Cypress Manor in Fall 2011 before later becoming abandoned. As of 2025, the building is being converted to serve as a gym for the nearby Thales Academy.
Edmonds, Washington	7212 220th St SW, Edmonds, WA 98026	1991 (Funtasia); February 18, 2011 (Huish Family Fun Center)	2020	N/A	Originally opened as Funtasia in 1991, before closing in May 2010 and reopened on February 18, 2011, as the Edmonds Family Fun Center. In 2020, the Huish family shuttered this location, and the property became the subject of three fires in 2021, 2024, and 2025 after abandonment.

== Gallery ==
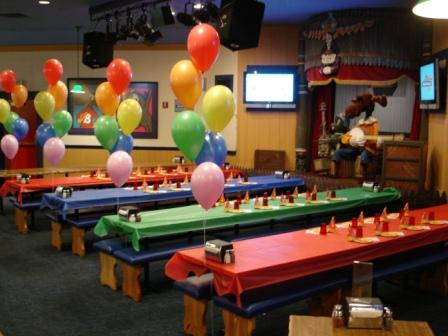
Bullwinkle's Showroom with an AVG "B-Show" formerly at the Wilsonville, Oregon location (2007)
