= Saint Ruth =

Saint Ruth or St Ruth's may refer to:

- St Ruth, Queensland, Australian locality
- St. Ruth Missionary Baptist Church, Dania Beach, Florida, U.S.A.
- Ruthenius, martyred companion of Saint Denis of Paris
- Ruth (biblical figure), a Moabite who marries an Israelite in the Hebrew Bible
- Charles Chalmot de Saint-Ruhe (c. 1650 – 12 July 1691), a French cavalry officer erroneously called "Saint-Ruth" in many English-language sources

== See also ==
- Struth, commune in Bas-Rhin, France
