= Parques Reunidos =

Spanish entertainment operator

- Type: Private
- Industry: Amusement parks
- Founded: 1967
- Headquarters: Madrid, Spain
- Area served: Worldwide
- Key people: Pascal Ferracci (CEO)
- Owners: EQT AB (51.0%); Elliott Management (12.8%)
- Website: parquesreunidos.com

Parques Reunidos (meaning "Reunited Parks") is an international entertainment operator based in Madrid, Spain. The group operates over 60 parks in nine countries. Parques Reunidos operates theme and amusement parks, zoos, water parks, family entertainment centers, and cable cars. These facilities are located in Spain, Belgium, Norway, the Netherlands, Denmark, the United Kingdom, Germany, France, and Italy. Annual visitors to the group's attractions exceed 22 million, with revenue exceeding $570 million (USD). In 2008, it had the fifth-highest attendance figures for worldwide chains with 24.9 million, ahead of United Parks & Resorts and Cedar Fair.

== Palace Entertainment ==
Palace Entertainment
- Type: Private
- Industry: Amusement parks
- Founded: 1998; 28 years ago
- Defunct: 2025; 1 year ago
- Fate: Assets acquired by Herschend
- Successor: Herschend
- Headquarters: Pittsburgh, Pennsylvania
- Area served: United States
- Owner: Parques Reunidos
- Website: www.palaceentertainment.com

Palace Entertainment was a subsidiary of Parques Reunidos, based in Pittsburgh, Pennsylvania, and primarily operated attractions in the United States.

Palace Entertainment was established in 1998, after the acquisition of four independently owned family entertainment companies. These four companies consisted of five brands: Camelot Parks, Palace Park, Boomers!, Grand Prix Race-O-Rama and Family Fun Center. In the early 2000s the company purchased various Water Parks and Family Entertainment Centers.

On February 27, 2006, it was announced that MidOcean Partners was to acquire Palace Entertainment. This transaction occurred in the second quarter of 2006.

On August 24, 2007, MidOcean Partners sold Palace Entertainment to Parques Reunidos for $330 Million. This transaction took place in the third quarter of 2007.

Fernando Eiroa joined Palace Entertainment in 2007, serving as president and chief executive officer.

On December 11, 2007 Kennywood Entertainment Company entered an agreement to sell their Five Properties (Kennywood, Idlewild and Soak Zone, Sandcastle Waterpark, Lake Compounce and Story Land) to Palace Entertainment's parent company Parques Reunidos. By 2009 Palace had taken over operations of all five parks.

On November 12, 2010, Palace Entertainment announced the acquisition of Dutch Wonderland Family Amusement Park in Lancaster County, Pennsylvania, from Hershey Entertainment and Resorts Company.

On March 2, 2012, Palace Entertainment announced the acquisition of Noah's Ark Water Park in Wisconsin Dells, Wisconsin.

In 2014, Palace Entertainment acquired Miami Seaquarium in Key Biscayne, Florida.

Later that year, Palace Entertainment sold 15 properties to the newly formed Apex Parks Group, including Big Kahuna's, 10 Boomers locations, as well as an additional Family 4 Entertainment Centers. This was in an effort to move away from Family Entertainment Center operations for Palace Entertainment.

In March 2020, it was announced that Palace Entertainment would open a new corporate facility near the Kennywood property. This new facility will house 25 executives as well as their East Coast team.

In December 2021, Palace Entertainment acquired Adventureland in Altoona, Iowa.

In March 2025, Herschend announced it had reached an agreement to acquire all of Palace Entertainment's United States parks.

== Amusement parks ==
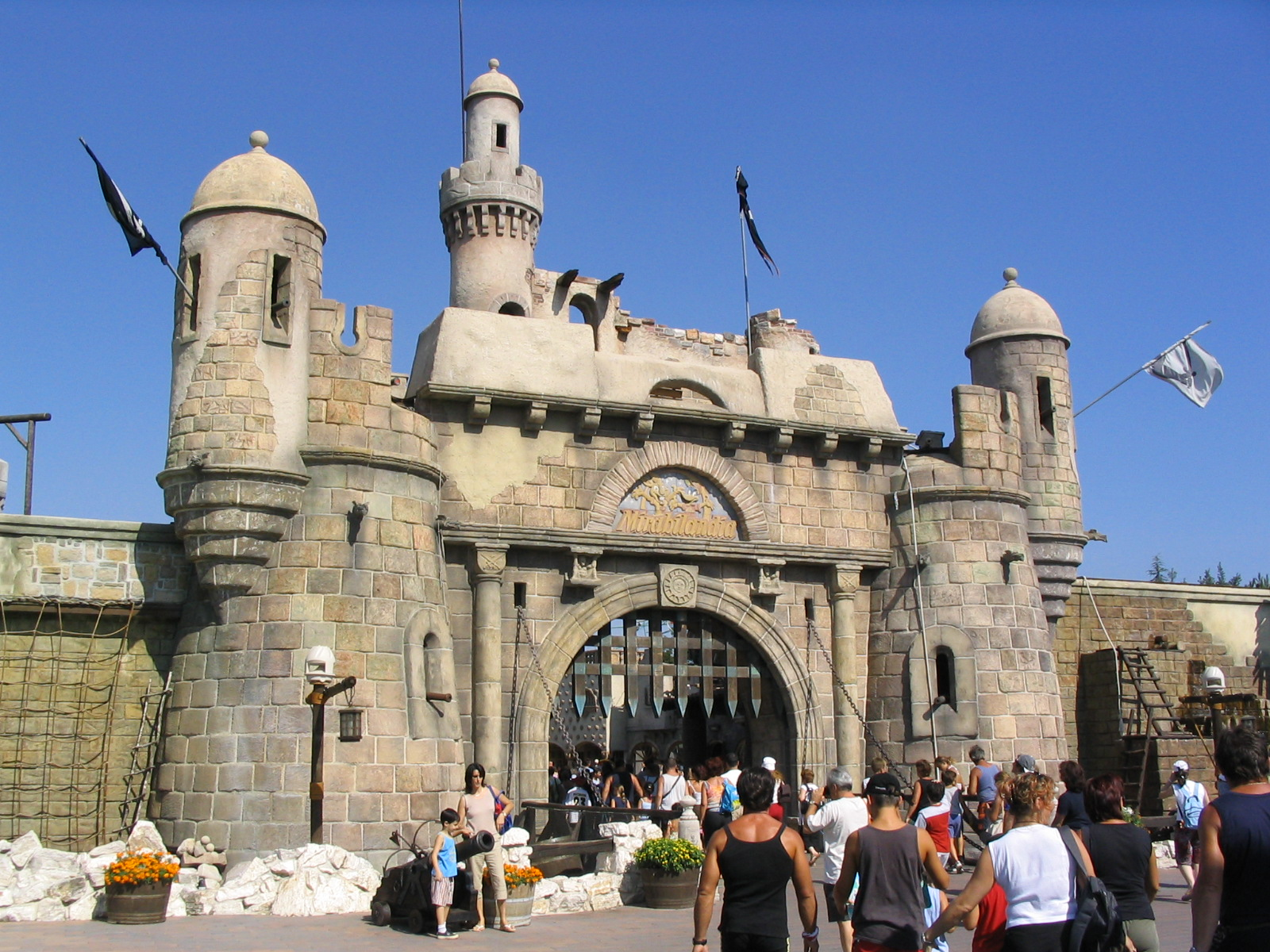
The entrance of Mirabilandia, Ravenna, Italy

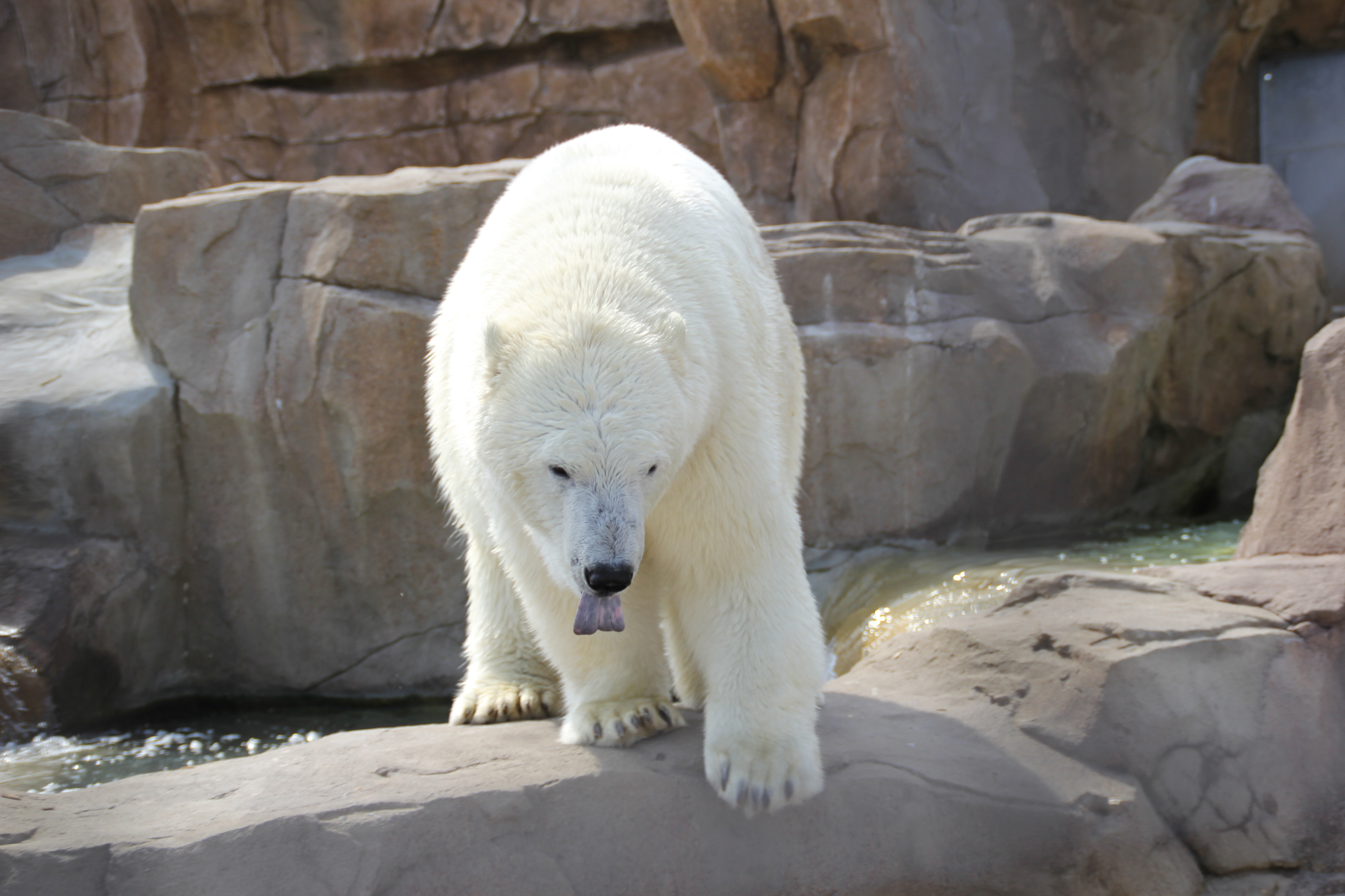
Polar bear at Marineland of Antibes, France

Parques Reunidos currently operates 8 amusement park properties across seven European countries.

Name	Location	Year opened	Year acquired	Notes
Europe
Bobbejaanland	Lichtaart, Belgium	1961	2004	
BonBon-Land	Næstved, Denmark	1992	2007	
Mirabilandia	Ravenna, Italy	1992	2006	
Movie Park Germany	Bottrop-Kirchhellen, Germany	1996	2010	
Parque de Atracciones de Madrid	Madrid, Spain	1969		
Parque Warner Madrid	Madrid, Spain	2002		
Attractiepark Slagharen	Hardenberg, Netherlands	1963		
Tusenfryd	Vinterbro, Norway	1988		

== Zoos, aquariums and nature parks ==
Parques Reunidos currently operates 10 zoos, aquariums and nature parks across three European countries.

Name	Location	Year opened	Year acquired	Notes
Europe
Atlantis Aquarium	Madrid, Spain			
Blackpool Zoo	Lancashire, England	1972		
Delfinario Costa Daurada	Costa Daurada, Spain			
Faunia	Madrid, Spain			
Lakes Aquarium	Lakeside, England	1997		
Oceanarium	Bournemouth, England			
Selwo Aventura	Estepona, Spain	1999		
Selwo Marina	Benalmádena, Spain	2002		
Weltvogelpark Walsrode	Walsrode, Germany	1962	2019	
Zoo Aquarium	Madrid, Spain	1770		

== Water parks ==
Parques Reunidos currently operates 10 water parks across five European countries.

Name	Location	Year opened	Year acquired	Notes
Europe
Aqua Mexicana	Hardenberg, Netherlands			Part of Attractiepark Slagharen
Aquopolis Cartaya	Cartaya, Spain			
Aquopolis Costa Daurada	Costa Daurada, Spain			
Aquopolis Cullera	Cullera, Spain			
Aquopolis Torrevieja	Torrevieja, Spain			
Aquopolis Villanueva de la Cañada	Villanueva de la Cañada, Spain			
Aqualud	Le Touquet, France			
Mirabeach	Ravenna, Italy	2003	2006	Part of Mirabilandia
Tropical Islands	Krausnick, Germany	2004	2018	
Warner Beach	Madrid, Spain	2014		Part of Parque Warner Madrid

== Family Entertainment Centers ==
Parques Reunidos currently operates 1 family entertainment center in the United Kingdom.

Name	Location	Year opened	Year acquired	Notes
Europe
Nickelodeon Adventure Lakeside	Thurrock, England	2020		

== Cable Cars ==
Parques Reunidos currently operates 1 cable car in Spain.

Name	Location	Year opened	Year acquired	Notes
Europe
Teleférico de Benalmádena	Benalmádena, Spain	1999		

== Former properties ==
Park	Location	Property Type	Year acquired/opened	Year sold/closed	Notes
Asia
Motiongate Dubai	Dubai, United Arab Emirates	Amusement Park	2016	Status Unknown	Owned by Dubai Parks and Resorts; Last appeared on the official Parques Reunidos website in 2022
Bollywood Parks Dubai	Dubai, United Arab Emirates	Amusement Park	2016	Status Unknown	Owned by Dubai Parks and Resorts; Last appeared on the official Parques Reunidos website in 2018. Now known as Real Madrid World.
Dragon Park	Hạ Long, Vietnam	Amusement Park	2017	Status Unknown	Owned by Sun Group; Last appeared on the official Parques Reunidos website in 2018
Typhoon Water Park	Hạ Long, Vietnam	Water Park	2017	Status Unknown	Owned by Sun Group; Last appeared on the official Parques Reunidos website in 2018
Europe
Aquopolis Seville	Seville, Spain	Water Park		2021	Rebranded back to Guadalpark; Now operated by Wibit
Aquaopolis San Fernando de Henares	Madrid, Spain	Water Park		2018	Did not reopen for 2019, Planned to become green space
Belantis	Leipzig, Germany	Amusement Park	2003	2025	Sold to Compagnie des Alpes
El Balcón de Rosales	Madrid, Spain	Night Club		2008	Closed after an 18-year-old was beaten to death.
L'Oceanogràfic	Valencia, Spain	Aquarium	2003	2015	Now operated by Vancouver Aquarium Marine Science Centre
Marineland of Antibes	Antibes, France	Aquarium, Water Park, Kid's Center	1970	2025	
Nickelodeon Adventure Madrid	Madrid, Spain	Family Entertainment Center	2018	2019	Closed September 8, 2019
Nickelodeon Adventure Murcia	Murcia, Spain	Family Entertainment Center	2017	2022	
Teleférico de Madrid	Madrid, Spain	Cable Car		2017	Operations were taken back over by the city of Madrid
Valwo	Matapozuelos, Spain	Zoo	1982	2007	Closed in 2007
South America
Aquarium de Mar del Plata	Mar del Plata, Argentina	Aquarium		2018	Sold to Dolphin Discovery
North America
Big Kahuna's	Destin, Florida	Water Park, Family Entertainment Center	1986	2014	Part of the Palace Entertainment subsidiary
Boomers! Parks	Various	Family Entertainment Center		2014	Part of the Palace Entertainment subsidiary
Boomers! Parks	Anaheim, California	Family Entertainment Center		2004	Part of the Palace Entertainment subsidiary
Boomers! Parks	Bakersfield, California	Family Entertainment Center		2004	Part of the Palace Entertainment subsidiary
Boomers! Parks	Dania, Florida	Family Entertainment Center		2015	Part of the Palace Entertainment subsidiary
Boomers! Parks	Escondido, California	Family Entertainment Center		2004	Part of the Palace Entertainment subsidiary
Boomers! Parks	Medford, New York	Family Entertainment Center	1999	2019	Part of the Palace Entertainment subsidiary
Jazzland	New Orleans, Louisiana	Amusement Park	2000	2002	Part of the Palace Entertainment subsidiary
Malibu Grand Prix	Redwood City, California	Family Entertainment Center	1979	2013	Part of the Palace Entertainment subsidiary
Malibu Grand Prix	San Antonio, Texas	Family Entertainment Center	1978	2014	Part of the Palace Entertainment subsidiary
Miami Seaquarium	Miami, Florida	Marine Animal Park	1955	2014	Part of the Palace Entertainment subsidiary
Mountain Creek Water Park	Vernon Township, New Jersey	Water Park	1978	2011	Part of the Palace Entertainment subsidiary
Mountasia	Houston, Texas	Family Entertainment Center		2014	Part of the Palace Entertainment subsidiary
Mountasia	Kingwood, Texas	Family Entertainment Center		2007	Part of the Palace Entertainment subsidiary
Raging Waters Sacramento	Cal Expo, Sacramento, California	Water Park	1986	2022	Part of the Palace Entertainment subsidiary
Raging Waters San Jose	East San Jose, San Jose, California	Water Park	1985	2023	Part of the Palace Entertainment subsidiary
Silver Springs	Silver Springs, Florida	Attraction	1878	2013	Part of the Palace Entertainment subsidiary
SpeedZone	Dallas, Texas	Family Entertainment Center	1997	2014	Part of the Palace Entertainment subsidiary
SpeedZone	Los Angeles, California	Family Entertainment Center	1997	2014	Part of the Palace Entertainment subsidiary
Waterworld California	Concord, California	Water Park	2011	2017	Part of the Palace Entertainment subsidiary
Wet N' Wild Las Vegas	Las Vegas, Nevada	Water Park	2002	2004	Part of the Palace Entertainment subsidiary
Wild Waters Water Park	Silver Springs, Florida	Water Park	1978	2013	Part of the Palace Entertainment subsidiary
Adventureland	Altoona, Iowa	Amusement Park	1974	2025	Sold to Herschend Family Entertainment
Castle Park	Riverside, California	Amusement Park	1976	2025	Sold to Herschend Family Entertainment
Dutch Wonderland	Lancaster, Pennsylvania	Amusement Park	1963	2025	Sold to Herschend Family Entertainment
Idlewild and Soak Zone	Ligonier, Pennsylvania	Amusement Park	1887	2025	Sold to Herschend Family Entertainment
Kennywood	West Mifflin, Pennsylvania	Amusement Park	1899	2025	Sold to Herschend Family Entertainment
Lake Compounce	Bristol, Connecticut	Amusement Park	1846	2025	Sold to Herschend Family Entertainment
Story Land	Glen, New Hampshire	Amusement Park	1954	2025	Sold to Herschend Family Entertainment
Living Shores Aquarium	Glen, New Hampshire	Aquarium	2019	2025	Sold to Herschend Family Entertainment
Sea Life Park Hawaii	Waimanalo Beach, Hawaii	Aquarium	1964	2025	Sold to Herschend Family Entertainment
Noah's Ark Water Park	Wisconsin Dells, Wisconsin	Water Park	1979	2025	Sold to Herschend Family Entertainment
Raging Waters Los Angeles	San Dimas, Los Angeles County, California	Water Park	1983	2025	Sold to Herschend Family Entertainment
Sandcastle Waterpark	West Homestead, Pennsylvania	Water Park	1989	2025	Sold to Herschend Family Entertainment
Splish Splash	Riverhead, New York	Water Park	1989	2025	Sold to Herschend Family Entertainment
Water Country	Portsmouth, New Hampshire	Water Park	1984	2025	Sold to Herschend Family Entertainment
Wet'n Wild Emerald Pointe	Greensboro, North Carolina	Water Park	1984	2025	Sold to Herschend Family Entertainment
Boomers! Palm Springs	Palm Springs, California	Family Entertainment Center	1998	2025	Sold to Herschend Family Entertainment
Boomers! Vista	Vista, California	Family Entertainment Center	1998	2025	Sold to Herschend Family Entertainment
Malibu Grand Prix	Norcross, Georgia	Family Entertainment Center	2002	2025	Sold to Herschend Family Entertainment
Mountasia	Marietta, Georgia	Family Entertainment Center	2002	2025	Sold to Herschend Family Entertainment
Oceania
Raging Waters Sydney	Prospect, New South Wales	Water Park	2013	2026	Sold to Jamberoo Action Park
