= Selwo Marina =

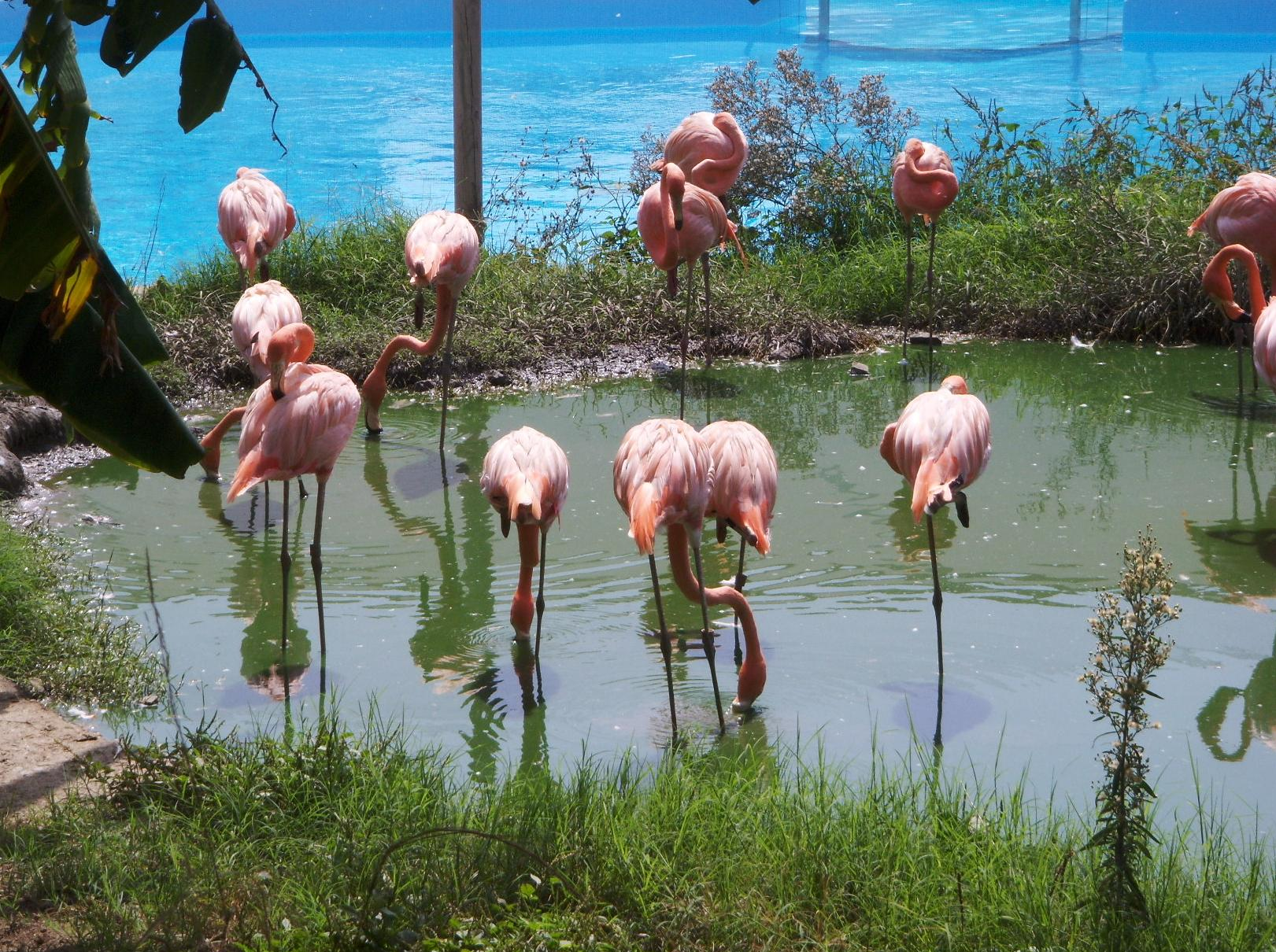
- Flamingos in Selwo Marina, 2009
- Interactive map of Selwo Marina
- 36°35′32″N 4°31′55″W
- Location: Benalmadena, Spain
- Land area: 1.67 ha (180,000 sq ft)
- Memberships: EAZA
- Major exhibits: Dolphins, Birds, Snakes
- Owner: Parques Reunidos
- Website: www.selwomarina.es

Selwo Marina is a small (1.67 hectares) marine park located in Benalmádena, Spain. It is the only park of its kind in Andalusia.

The park has 4 areas; 'Antillas', 'Las Hondonada', 'Amazonia' and 'Isla de Hielo'. 'Antillas' is where the dolphin and sea lion pools are located. There are 4 large pools, three of which are home to their three bottlenose dolphins, and the last used for interactive programmes such as Swim With a Sea Lion. The main large pool (The 'Show Pool') is used by both the dolphins and sea lions during shows, however the sea lions do not have access to it otherwise. 'Las Hondonada' is the area in which the Bird and Snake Shows take place. There are also aviaries to view the parrots when they are not performing. 'Amazonia' is a small indoor area containing tank of snakes, lizards, fish, caimans and a collection of others. 'Isla de Hielo' translates to 'Island of Ice' and is home to their collection of penguins. The penguin exhibit mimics that of their natural habitat; the amount of light they receive during the day is relative to what they would receive in the wild, so that during the summer the lights are at their dimmest, and in winter they are at their brightest.

== Dolphins ==
The park have 8 dolphins: Zeus (M), Tonet (M), Bravo (M), Sting (M), Rumbo (M), Ringo (M), Lennon (M) and Blu (M).
