= National Association of Family Entertainment Centers =

The National Association of Family Entertainment Centers (NAFEC) is a division of the International Laser Tag Association, Inc. (ILTA), the non-profit trade group for the laser tag industry that started in 1996. NAFEC is the non-profit developer and operator association for the family entertainment industry. They help members become better informed through research, services, and communications with all levels of the industry. NAFEC has three levels of memberships: Developer, Operator and Supplier.

NAFEC as of 2011 has over 200 members nationwide. They provide members with up to date data on safety, operations, marketing, seminars, trade shows and much more.

NAFEC works closely with the lawmakers of the US to ensure that new and existing laws do not infringe on the rights of its members.

== History ==
The birth of NAFEC came after the 2009 dissolution of the premier FEC trade association the International Association for the Leisure and Entertainment Industry (IALEI) and subsequent merger with IAAPA.
