= Malibu Grand Prix =

Defunct amusement centre chain

- Industry: Entertainment
- Number of locations: 40
- Parent: Malibu Grand Prix (before 1976); Warner Communications (1976-1983); California Investor and Canadian Developers (1983-1995); Mountasia (1995-2025); Herschend (2025-Present)

Malibu Grand Prix (MGP) was an entertainment company founded by Ron Cameron that was popular during the 1970s and 1980s. The company served as a franchised miniature Indy car racing track. The typical complex included a 3000-4000 sq ft. arcade with a concession stand and a race track outside, covering around 10,000 to 20,000 sq ft (1,900 m^{2}) altogether. It was acquired by Warner Communications in 1976 which in turn sold it in late 1983 to a group of Canadian developers and a local entrepreneur whose background included Chuck E. Cheese’s. There were a total of 40 locations at the time of acquisition including 32 tracks and 8 family entertainment centers featuring miniature golf, batting cages, bumper boats and more. As part of the acquisition, Malibu acquired seven parks from Castle Entertainment which was in bankruptcy. These locations were located in North Hollywood, Sherman Oaks, and Redondo Beach, California; El Paso, Texas; Honolulu, Hawaii; and Ft. Lauderdale and Miami, Florida. A location in Tulsa, Oklahoma was acquired in late 1984 that included a small waterpark and a Malibu-like racing facility. The California partner sold out in 1986, and the Canadians sold the chain to Mountasia in 1995. In early 2025, the park was sold to Herschend.

== Sites ==
=== Norcross, Georgia ===
5400 Brook Hollow Pkwy, Norcross, GA 30071
This location is now closed with the last day of operations being September 28 2025.

=== Albuquerque, New Mexico ===
Located just south of I-25 and Jefferson, along the west side of the Pan American Freeway.

=== North Hollywood, California ===
One of the Castle Entertainment locations that was on the corner of Vanowen and Whitsett. This location had arcades, mini golf, batting cages, go kart racing. Prior to the go karts this was also home to massive water slides, and before that an outdoor trampoline park. This location was shut down after a massive fire in 1998 and now the site is occupied by senior living apartments.

=== Sherman Oaks, California ===
Sepulveda Blvd just north of the 101 freeway. Was acquired by Malibu Grand Prix in 1984 with its merger with Castle Entertainment that was in bankruptcy. The property was leased from the Los Angeles Recreation and Parks District, which assumed operations around 1987. Malibu had changed the name from Castle Park to Malibu Castle; the City returned the name to the original.

=== Louisville, Kentucky ===
Near the intersection of Interstate 264 and Poplar Level Road.

=== Pasadena, California ===
The Pasadena, California, site was located on the southwest corner of Foothill Blvd and Madre, just north of the 210 Freeway. While impossible to verify, locals who frequented this location recall top lap times in the 50.0 to 51.5 range.

=== Tempe, Arizona ===
The Tempe, Arizona, site on Hayden Road, south of McKellips Road closed in the mid-1990s. The land is now occupied by a FedEx distribution facility. This site was acquired by MGP from a private operator, Grand Prix of Phoenix in 1979. Therefore, it was the fastest Malibu track in the country with only 13 turns in a 1/2 mile. Track record was in the 47-second bracket. It was a favorite stop by many touring artists including Pink Floyd, Dire Straits, Aerosmith, Scorpions, Foreigner, and many more. Also professional drivers like Michael Andretti, Dan Gurney, Al Unser Jr.

=== Tucson, Arizona ===
The Tucson venue was located on 22nd Street, just east of Alvernon Way. It closed during the mid-1990s, replaced by a number of fast-food restaurants.

=== Fountain Valley, California ===
Near Warner and Magnolia the site was adjacent to a Boomer's featuring miniature golf, batting cages and other entertainment. The site was closed in the 90's, and Boomer's was shut down in 2019.

=== City of Industry, California ===
Originally located on Castleton Street, right next to the Pomona freeway, it featured a large arcade with the latest coin-operated games, 2–3 full-sized pay-per-play pool tables, along with the infamous go cart track. Both 3/4-scale Indy-Style race cars and smaller go-carts were raced on the track. MGP also owned/operated the fun center next door simply known as "Showboat". Showboat had its own arcade section, two 18-hole miniature golf courses, and a water park. Both places no longer exist; they later became a SpeedZone (originally Malibu SpeedZone) and featured the scaled race cars, go karts, and scaled dragsters. The park has since then been rebranded again to Boomers Los Angeles.

=== Tampa, Florida ===
One of a few of the remaining facilities, the Malibu Grand Prix location in Tampa, Florida, became independent from the other locations, and the name was changed to Grand Prix Tampa. It includes two 18-hole miniature golf courses surrounded by ponds and obstacles, a game room, a snack bar, a 1/2-mile (800 m) race track with 3/4-scale Indy-style Formula race cars, a go-kart track for younger kids, and a recently added paintball field.

=== Orlando, Florida ===
Started as a Malibu Track and arcade, later a Castle Golf and Games was added next door. It was located directly off I-4 right behind the "Hi Q" hotel off International Dr on American Way. A Homewood suites hotel now sits on the property.

=== Fort Lauderdale, Florida ===
Malibu built a Malibu Grand Prix next to I 95 between Stirling Road and Griffin Road in 1979. The location was hard to get to and only lasted a few years. It was sold to Grand Pix Race o Rama which had a location nearby, but was displaced when I 595 was built in 1989. It was sold again and operated as Boomers with a huge wooden roller coaster. Boomers closed in 2017 when the land was bought and the park was leveled. Shopping is being built on the site as of this date. Some will read this and be confused as there was a water park called Atlantis The Water Kingdom at the Stirling road exit, and a Castle Park just north of Malibu, which was knocked down also so that I 595 could be built.

=== Houston, Texas ===
Houston, Texas, once had three Malibu Grand Prix locations. The Southwest Freeway location was shuttered in the early 1990s. This location was the site of the (locally) infamous Malibu Grand Prix murders. The murders were committed on July 1, 1983, during the course of a robbery. Four employees who had just closed up and were in the process of conducting post-closing housekeeping duties were killed. A recently terminated employee gained entry to the building under the pretext of picking up his last paycheck, and brought two accomplices with him. All were convicted (two received the death penalty, and one was sentenced to life imprisonment). The site was razed in the early 1990s and is now a location of a health clinic serving the Gulfton area.

The other location was off the Katy Freeway and the northwest corner of the West Loop 610 at Old Katy Road (the Old Katy location was the remaining Houston-area Malibu Grand Prix location until it was boarded up in early 2005). After closing, the site sat empty until it was used as storage for a materials company, storing slabs of stone and rock on the golf course. As of December 2012 the property, along with all buildings to either side, has been completely demolished and is now part of the West Loop/US290 managed lanes expansion (the service road runs through the former Malibu Grand Prix compound).

The third location (I-45 North) at Shephard.

=== Oklahoma City, Oklahoma ===
Malibu Grand Prix in Oklahoma City was constructed in 1979 and offered: An arcade game room, concessions and the Virage 3/4 scale race car on a timed 1/2-mile grand prix course. In the early 80's the youth kart was added to the offerings it was called the Road Runner under Waner Brother's ownership and later changed to the Mini-Virage. In the mid 80's another option was added, the Grand Virage was a 2-seater option with a lemans style body. The site next door (formerly Family Fun Park) was leased to Malibu Grand Prix in 1985. This property had four water slides, a game room, bumper boats, slick track go-karts and outdoor carnival games. It was operated as Malibu Fun Park for only one year. With the rise of home console gaming, Malibu Grand Prix OKC shifted from their arcade to an indoor slot track in an effort to capitalize on a new market in 1989. Malibu Grand Prix closed in 1993. The site was then reopened in 1995 as America's Grand Prix. The America's Grand Prix had an arcade and a new NASCAR themed go-kart "high banked" track. America's Grand Prix closed in the late 1990s, and Frontier State Bank was built on the south half of the Grand Prix site in 2000. It was located on the east side of I-35 north at 5016 North Prospect (which is now I-35 Service Road).

=== Columbus, Ohio ===
Columbus, Ohio had a Malibu Grand Prix located on the north side of the city on Schrock Road, visible from Interstate 71. The Columbus location was primarily the Grand Prix track, and had a relatively small arcade in comparison to other locations. However, under the leadership of Glen "PDB" Brown in the late 90s, it was one of the most profitable locations. Tomas de la Ovejas ran the track operations while Garen "G-Dog" C maintained the garage. Operations ceased in late 2001, and the building is now a school. Some portions of the track can be seen in the school's playground.

=== Cincinnati (Sharonville), Ohio ===
Cincinnati, Ohio, Malibu Grand Prix was located on Interstate 75 in Sharonville on Dowlin Drive and adjacent to Burbank's Real Bar-B-Q. The location was open until the late 1990s, when it was left vacant and eventually demolished to make way for a Hilton Garden Inn. The track record is said to have been 48.600, set in 1991.

=== Fresno, California ===
Fresno, California was home to one of the first Malibu Grand Prix locations, near the intersection of Blackstone Ave and Herndon Ave. The facility stood from 1977 until 1997, at which time its 20-year lease on the property was up. The location was briefly renamed "Fresno Grand Prix" after being acquired by an independent investor, though the property owner eventually sold the parcel of land, which included one of the last drive-in movie theaters in California. The building and track were demolished to make way for an expansion of the River Park Shopping Center. The land once occupied by the track is now a Costco parking lot.

=== Oakland, California ===
There was also a Malibu Grand Prix in Oakland immediately south of the Coliseum from the 1970s through the mid-1990s. The facility was closed and demolished and the site is now an overflow parking lot for the Coliseum.

=== Redwood City, California ===
This location opened in 1979, and closed August 2013. Located at Highway 101 and Woodside Rd. Featured mini golf, batting cages, bumper boats, the "Castle," and the Virage/Roadrunner karts. The main site is now an office building complex, but remnants of the golf course and race track remain covered under weeds and grass. It was considered one of the most popular of all MGPs. Saturday nights were known for particularly long lines.

=== Pacheco, California ===
This one did not last as long as most. Located on Pacheco Blvd in Pacheco just north of Pleasant Hill and Concord, it was built around 1976 or '77 and lasted until only the mid-1980's It was sandwiched between the 680 southbound freeway, the river, and Pacheco Blvd, on a triangle-shaped property, and was very visible from the freeway, especially at night when the Grand Prix lights were on. Besides a large game room building where tickets were also purchased for the actual Grand Prix rides there were no other attractions. Since it didn't last as long as the rest, it never fell into a state of disrepair; rather, it just suddenly disappeared and was gone. No business moved in right away but around 10 years later the property finally has tenants and now consists of a public storage business and an equipment rental business.

=== Dayton, Ohio ===
The Dayton, Ohio location was across from the Dayton Mall on State Route 741 close to Centerville. This Location featured a large arcade and the classic Malibu Style Indy Car Track behind the Arcade. Three levels of cars were used including Mini Virage for the kids, Virage full size cars, and Grand Virage Cars which had 2 seats. There was a painting on the outside windows that said "Mortal Kombat II Now Here!" which stayed there until the building was demolished to make way for a Sun Super Savings Center Appliance and Computer Store which soon went out of business as well. The building is still on site and is now the home of a Michaels craft store and a Golf Galaxy store.

=== Mount Laurel, New Jersey ===
Southern New Jersey had a Malibu Grand Prix located in Mount Laurel on Fellowship road. The location featured two 1/2-mile virage-style tracks, mid-sized arcade room, birthday party area and concession stand. The south track was typically in constant use during business hours, while the north track would open during busier times. Karts offered at this location included Mini Virage, Virage, Grand Virage (two-seater) and the Club Car, which was available only to those who in the 53.50 club (completed two consecutive laps on the south track in a regular virage car in 53.50 seconds or less. The club car was significantly faster than the other cars along and had better tires, suspension, engine and transmission. The Club Car was clocked in excess of 70 MPH on a 1/4-mile track in Atco, New Jersey. Operations ceased and the building remained unused for years. Upon subsequent demolition for an office park, the body of an unidentified person was located on the formers grounds. As of January 2007, the case remains open.

In 1999, a vehicle was spotted driving on the closed racetrack while smoke poured out from the front windows. Police arrived, but not before the hooligans got away. On the site now is a Cooper health center.

=== Denver, Colorado ===
A Malibu Grand Prix with a track and arcade, was located north of Denver, Colorado at Interstate 25 exit 215 (58th Ave). The location is now a Furniture Row store. The last day of operation for the Denver location was after close of business on Monday, September 7, 1998 (Labor Day weekend). The location Area Manager at the time of closing was Robert D. Lujan. Lujan worked for Malibu Grand Prix from June 1984 through the closing date of the location.

=== Lenexa, Kansas ===
There was a Malibu Grand Prix in Lenexa, KS (Suburban Kansas City) that closed in the mid-1990s. The location was at the intersection of I-35 and 87th street. It consisted of a video game room, snackbar, and 1/2 mile traditional race track that featured Virage, Mini Virage, and Grand Virage (two-seater) race cars. It is now the site of a Perkins restaurant.

=== Portland, Oregon ===
A Malibu Grand Prix with track and arcade was located in Beaverton, Oregon, near the Washington Square Mall opened in the summer of 1979. Later with a new owner, in the 1990s, the location changed its name, becoming Malibu Raceway LLC. The facility included the racetrack, a video arcade and snackbar. A batting cage is also on the property owned and operated by a third party added well after the original launch of the race track and arcade. On April 4, 2013, The current owner, Kevin O'Connell, announced that Malibu Raceway LLC was ending all operations at the end of the month due to a leasing dispute. The current property was transformed into a used car lot (CarMax) and opened on September 24, 2014, while Malibu Raceway has relocated to the Mt. Hood Skibowl in Government Camp, OR.

=== Miami, Florida ===
Was the biggest of them all. Had two miniature golf courses, nine batting cage stalls, a castle building with over 120+ games, a go-kart track, kiddie kart track, mini train, bumper boats, formula 1 car track. It opened in 1982 and the land was sold in December 2000. The general manager at that time was Manuel Martinez. It was located at 7775 N.W. 7 ST. Miami, Fl 33126 nearby Mall of the Americas (currently Midway Crossings). Three large apartment buildings are in its place now. This location was previously a Castle Park which went in to bankruptcy in late 1983. Malibu Grand Prix acquired all the Castle Park locations in April 1984 and the locations were renamed to Malibu Castle Park.

=== Northridge, California ===
A Malibu Grand Prix track and arcade was located in the San Fernando Valley in the county of Los Angeles near the corner of Nordhoff and Corbin, across the street from the then Teledyne Company offices (now Lowes Home Improvement). The six-acre property opened in 1974 and was one of the first three site built in the chain of entertainment centers. It operated as a split function business. The arcade and food services was separate from the Virage and Road Runner garage/track operation. The Location Manager supervised the both functions.

The Shop Supervisor reported to the Location manager. The Shop Supervisor ensured the Virage vehicles were operational, 2 stroke pre-mix and 4 stroke fuel was order and offloaded to the underground tanks, the repair parts inventory was ordered and maintained, the Track and Signaling was safe and operational, and supervised shop personnel. Additionally, the Shop Supervisor supervised the rebuilding/restoration of the Virage cars that reached their targeted limit of operational hours. These cars were torn down and the frames sand blasted, powder coated and the cars reassembled.

The Virage cars had various engine types over the years. The air cooled Kawasaki 440 was used at Northridge from 1980 through 1982. It used an aluminum drive/driven arrangement utilizing a Goodyear belt.

During the 1980 through 1982 seasons, several Virage cars had sponsors. The black Armor All car was a crowd favorite but tended not to be the fastest on the track. For the Northridge location Virage cars, a track time of less than 55 seconds was considered very good.

The track was very popular in the late 1970s and was frequented by several child stars like Scott Baio, Adam Rich, and Kristy McNichol.

Corporate headquarters was located in Warner Center, Woodland Hills California until the company was restructured and sold.

After losing their lease when the site was sold to a Toyota dealership, this location closed in August 1994.

There was a Malibu Grand Prix located in Pasadena, Ca. The location in Pasadena CA was at the SW corner of Foothill Blvd and Sierra Madre Villa. Location is now an office building and parking lot.

There was a Malibu Castle in Redondo Beach at 2410 Marine Ave for 30 years. It closed in October 2005 and the land is now occupied by two hotels.

=== Anaheim, California ===
A Malibu Grand Prix track and arcade was located in Anaheim just north of Anaheim Stadium, the closest crossroads being East Katella Ave and the 57 Freeway. It had 2 tracks. This was the first Malibu Grand Prix location. It was located behind the original location of the big "A" of Anaheim Stadium (when it housed the scoreboard). A restaurant now occupies the parking area, backed by a large office building.

=== San Diego, California ===
A Malibu Grand Prix track and arcade was located in San Diego across the street from Naval Air Station Miramar (now MCAS Miramar) off of Miramar Blvd. It opened in the late 1970s and remained popular with locals for many years. Eventually, people in the area moved on to other things, the facility saw a significant decline in business, and soon fell into disrepair. The site was leveled and a multi business strip mall was built.

=== Austin, Texas ===
The Austin MGP was located on the East side of the 7400 block of IH-35 North, just north of Blackson Ave. and is now a Kia pre-owned car lot. As of this writing (Sept. 2010) you can still see remnants of the track on the Google Maps satellite image, but Google Street View shows the location as its current use.

=== San Antonio, Texas ===
It was built during the summer of 1978, and opened in October of that year. Located just north of the intersection of Loop 410 and IH-10, the property included the Malibu Grand Prix with arcade and track, and adjacent to it was "The Castle" which was the larger arcade plus a miniature golf course, bumper-boats and batting cages. It was billed as "Malibu Golf and Games" and it was quite a hike between the two even through they were on the same property. The sites greatest claim to fame was when the Canadian rock band "Rush" rented the track for recreation after their concert. Each band member purchased 150 tickets and raced far into the night. The track remained open until around 2002. Evidently sold and resold, the cars were worn out and in disrepair, the lap timer often didn't work, and the quality of the time you spent there went down badly. Then there were slot car tracks where the arcade was and a new track was built on the other side of "The Castle" which was an oval/figure 8 type thing with multi-cart racing instead of hot lapping. That brought some life back to the place, but eventually the Malibu portion (building) was razed and the track remains to this today (September 2015). The last day of operation for the San Antonio location was after close of business on Monday, September 7, 2015 (Labor Day weekend), citing economic reasons for not renewing its lease. Located on what must be an extremely valuable tract of land with some of the highest visibility (traffic) in the city, it has done well to make it this far.

=== Dallas, Texas ===
MGP opened for business in the spring of 1980 at 11150 Malibu Drive in northwest Dallas, Texas, on a tract of land near the intersection of I-35E and Walnut Hill Lane, with a freestanding "Castle" featuring many video games, pinball machines, and four miniature golf courses in addition to the main MGP building, which also offered video games in addition to the race track with its "Virage" cars.

In spring 1998, the site was completely renovated and reopened as the then new SpeedZone, which remained open for nearly 22 years before closing its doors on February 18, 2020.

There was also an MGP location in the Hurst-Euless-Bedford portion of the Fort Worth metropolitan area.

=== Hurst, Texas ===
Also opened in 1980 on N.E. Loop 820, later bought by Putt Putt and converted. A more powerful than usual tan-colored Virage car called "The Suburban Cowboy", number 80, was said to be very popular. Lines were often long at this location and there were many regulars.

=== Memphis, Tennessee ===
There was one in Memphis, Tennessee near I-40 and Sycamore View Road. This track was somewhat unique, featuring a sequence of double "esses" leading to a decreasing radius right-hander that ended with a 45-yard long "straightaway" to the timing/finish line.

=== Tulsa, Oklahoma ===
The site off West 51st between Union and 33rd West Avenue was built in 1984 and operated as an independent facility with 3 tracks, including the Grand Prix, kid-cart, and "Daytona" kart tracks. In 1985, the owners worked an operating deal with Malibu and the cars were all replaced with MGP Virages, RoadRunners on the kid-cart track, and higher-performance karts on the "Daytona" track. In late 1985, the franchiser had financial difficulties and MGP pulled all its corporate property (cars, games) from the facility, which promptly closed. The site has been largely paved over and has been used for a truck-driving school.

== Millennium Game Products ==
Malibu Grand Prix formed a division named Millennium Game Products in the mid 80s to create arcade games of their own. Ultimately the only game they released was the Laserdisc game Freedom Fighter, of which the animation for the game by Toei Animation was completed in 1984 and it was officially released in 1987. The company had numerous other Laserdisc games planned, stating that they were negotiating with Lucasfilm and other major studios, though none of these came to fruition and the division was shut down shortly after Freedom Fighter's release.

== Palace Entertainment buyout ==
In 2002, Palace Entertainment purchased the three remaining Malibu Grand Prix locations. These locations are in Redwood City, California, Norcross, Georgia, and San Antonio, Texas. Palace operates additional locations in Los Angeles, California and Dallas, Texas. The Redwood City, CA location closed on August 18, 2013 and the San Antonio location closed on September 7, 2015.

== References in popular culture ==
- Referenced in chapters 12 and 13 of Burn Down the Ground: A Memoir by Kambri Crews published by Random House in 2012.
- Malibu Grand Prix is mentioned in the song "Demolition Rickshaw!" on The Aquabats' 2005 album, Charge!!.
- A memorable scene from the 1979 film Van Nuys Blvd. was filmed at a Malibu Grand Prix facility in southern California, using the track and the game room.
- Referenced in the 2015 novel Armada by Ernest Cline
- Referenced in Season 4 Episode 4 of CHiPs when Harland tries to break the track record.
- Referenced in Season 2 Episode 20 "The Big Spill" of Baywatch where Hobie loses control of his kart as a result of poisoning.
- Referenced in the 1997 film Good Burger at the real life Malibu Castle Park in Redondo Beach, California
