= Dania Beach Hurricane =

Former roller coaster in Dania Beach, Florida

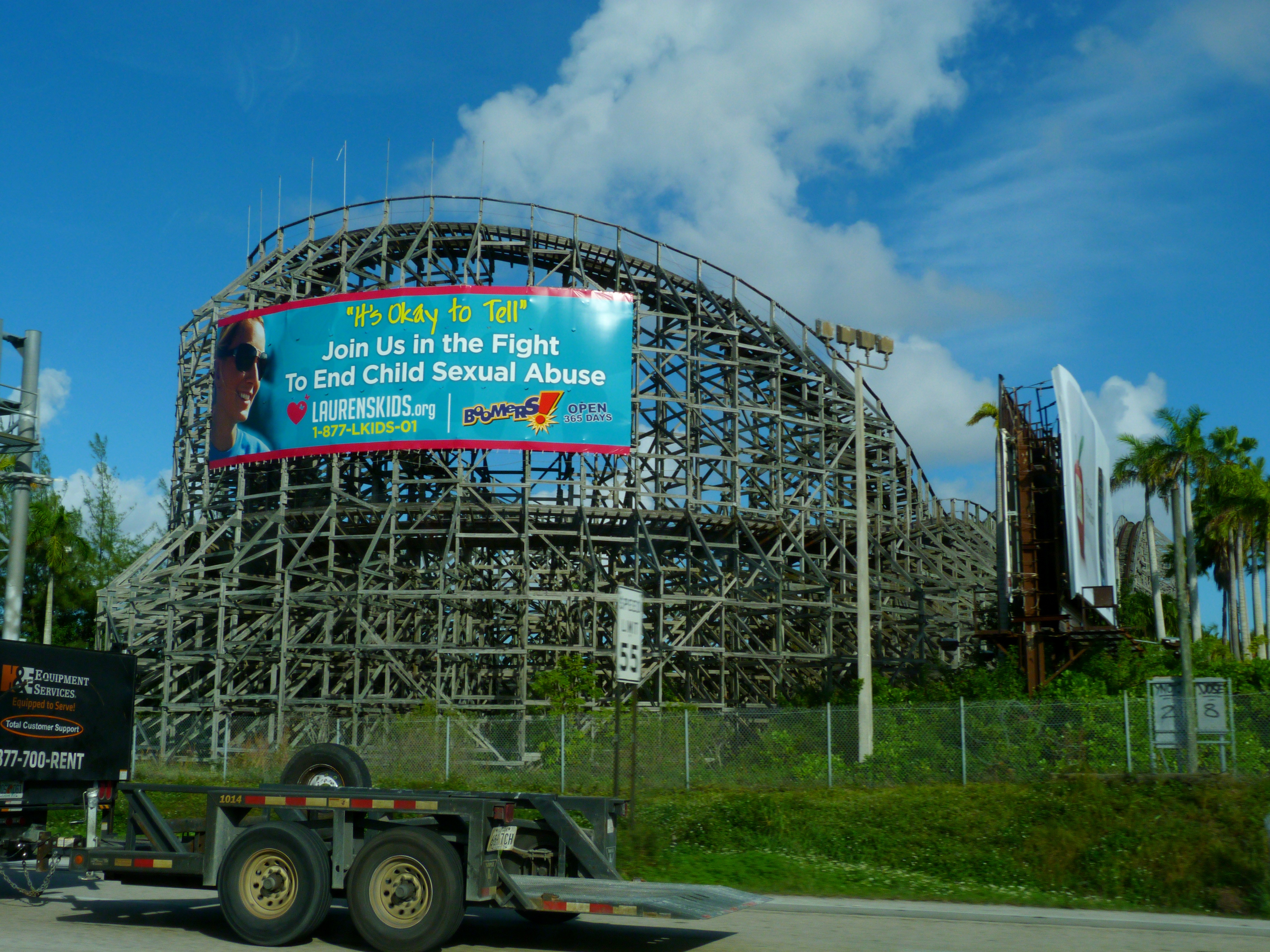

Boomers!
- Location: Boomers!
- Park section: Cyclone World
- Coordinates: 26°03′14″N 80°09′37″W
- Status: Removed
- Opening date: November 1, 2000
- Closing date: April 26, 2011
- Cost: $4,500,000

General statistics
- Type: Wood
- Manufacturer: Coaster Works, Inc.
- Designer: Stand Company
- Lift/launch system: Chain lift hill
- Height: 100 ft (30 m)
- Drop: 100 ft (30 m)
- Length: 3,200 ft (980 m)
- Speed: 50 mph (80 km/h)
- Duration: 1:50
- Max vertical angle: 60°
- G-force: 3
- Height restriction: 48 in (122 cm)
- Dania Beach Hurricane at RCDB

The Dania Beach Hurricane was a wooden roller coaster next to the former flagship Boomers! amusement park in Dania Beach, Florida, United States. It was designed by the Stand Company and was built by Coaster Works. Built in 2000 at a cost of $4.5 million, it was Florida's third wooden roller coaster. The 3,200 ft (980 m) long out and back coaster reached a top speed of 55 mph (89 km/h). Despite being located next to the Boomers! park, it was operated by a separate entity named Dania Coaster Limited.

Construction of the ride started in January 2000, and Dania Beach Hurricane opened on November 1, 2000, four months after it was scheduled to open. Over the course of its operation, five couples held their weddings on the Hurricane, and numerous television commercials were filmed there. The Hurricane closed on April 26, 2011. The ride remained standing but not operating until 2016, when the Boomers! park was demolished to make room for a new shopping plaza.

== History ==
=== Operation ===
The ride was conceived by Jules Ross, who had previously operated several amusements in South Florida. Construction started in January 2000, and the ride was initially planned to open in July 2000, although the opening was delayed due to weather-related issues. Forty employees built the coaster, working in 12-hour shifts. Dania Beach city officials anticipated that the ride's construction would benefit the local economy by turning Boomers! into a visitor destination. Ross himself predicted that the coaster would draw patrons from four neighboring counties. The coaster received approval to open after it passed a Florida state inspection on October 30, 2000.

Dania Beach Hurricane opened on November 1, 2000. The coaster's inaugural ride raised $7,000 for a local charity, with seats being auctioned off for as much as $750. At the time of its construction, the Hurricane was South Florida's only permanent roller coaster. As part of a publicity stunt in 2001, thousands of people signed up to ride the Hurricane for 48 hours straight; one of the four winners, a college student, received a new Kia Rio. The Hurricane's lighting system was slightly damaged in a hurricane in 2004, though the ride itself was not damaged.

Over the course of the coaster's operation, several couples were married while riding the Hurricane, including one of the ride's maintenance workers and his wife. Allyson Goodwin, a lawyer for the ride's owners, cited the ride as having hosted three weddings, while the Sun-Sentinel said five weddings had taken place there. Numerous television commercials were filmed on the Hurricane, and Goodwin said a photo shoot for Playboy magazine had also taken place there. In addition, Amusement Today magazine had listed the Hurricane as being among the United States' top 20 wooden coasters. Boomers! general manager Andy Hyman said in 2005 that, since the Hurricane was so easily visible from Interstate 95, "it gives the park the most visibility and interest".

=== Closure and demolition ===
The Hurricane closed indefinitely on April 26, 2011. Although the ride's owners had not officially declared bankruptcy, Hyman cited bad economic conditions as the reason for the ride's closure. The Sun-Sentinel reported that South Florida's warm and humid climate had roughened the track over time, and the owners could not pay the increasing maintenance and insurance costs. When news of the coaster's closure was announced, a spokesman for American Coaster Enthusiasts expressed hope that a private operator would take over the ride's operation. Dania Beach officials said it was unlikely that a private operator would be found, since the officials were planning to redevelop the site. The coaster and the neighboring Boomers! location were planned to be replaced with retail, as demand for commercial space in the surrounding area was growing rapidly.

The Hurricane's owners estimated that the ride could be sold for scrap at a cost of several million dollars. In October 2012, the owners announced that they wanted a nonprofit organization to buy the ride. Within a month, the owners had received inquiries from 15 organizations. The Hurricane was nearly auctioned off in January 2013 for non-payment of taxes, but the auction was canceled after the owners paid the taxes that they owed. The owners' lawyer Allyson Goodwin said in April 2013 that no charities had expressed interest in the Hurricane. Goodwin said that a French group had expressed interest in relocating the coaster, and she also said an interior designer was looking to recycle the ride's wood in restaurants, lobbies, and other commercial space. According to Goodwin, it would cost at least $3 million to relocate the ride or $10 million to rebuild the ride with new materials.

The adjoining Boomers! park closed in January 2015 because it was unprofitable. By then, the Dania Beach Hurricane was planned to be demolished later that year. The coaster remained abandoned until demolition began in March 2016. The final section of Dania Beach Hurricane was demolished in May 2016.

== Characteristics ==
Dania Beach Hurricane was Florida's fourth wooden roller coaster, after Gwazi at Busch Gardens Tampa Bay, Starliner at Panama City Beach, and Deep Dipper at Hialeah Park. It was designed by Jules Ross and the Stand Company and was built by Coaster Works. The Boomers! website referred to Dania Beach Hurricane as the "largest wooden roller coaster in Florida". Despite being located next to the Boomers! park, it was owned and operated separately from the park. Dania Coaster Limited operated the ride, which initially cost $6 per ticket. The coaster occupied an L-shaped site next to the Boomers! park.

The 3,200 ft (980 m) long out and back coaster reached a top speed of 55 mph (89 km/h). It was intended to resemble the layout of Predator, a wooden roller coaster at Six Flags Darien Lake. Departing from the station, the train dipped into a left U-turn and ascended the lift hill. Once at the top, the train entered a pre-drop turning right, then traversed a larger drop, a small airtime hill, and a right-banked turnaround. Afterward, the train entered two more hills before traversing a left-banked turnaround. The train then ran around the outer region of the layout, traveling over a series of hills and a third, left-banked turnaround. After a final 90-degree left turn, the train entered the brake run immediately before entering the station.

The ride could be seen from the nearby Interstate 95. Its construction involved over a million board-feet of wood and eight million pounds of concrete. The coaster operated with two trains, each seating six people in five cars. One of the trains was painted red, while the other was colored blue. Riders had to be at least 48 in (120 cm) tall.
