= SpeedZone (amusement park) =

Family entertainment centers in the USA

SpeedZone, also known as Malibu and Malibu SpeedZone are the names of a group of motorsports-themed family entertainment centers throughout the United States. Founded in 1997, the chain started out as an adult entertainment center requiring that attendees have a valid driver's license, featuring a full-service bar and restaurant, and offering late hours. The chain includes three family racetracks located in Kennesaw, Georgia (Northwest of Atlanta), the City of Industry, California (within the Greater Los Angeles Area), and Dallas, Texas. All of the facilities were owned by Palace Entertainment and were former Malibu Grand Prix tracks.

SpeedZone Dallas closed on February 18, 2020.

SpeedZone Los Angeles was rebranded to Boomers! Los Angeles in April of 2022.

The following movies have been filmed at SpeedZone (City of Industry, California)

- Guess Who (Ashton Kutcher and Bernie Mac)
- Clerks II (Jeff Anderson and Brian O'Halloran)
