= Boomers! Parks =

American theme park chain

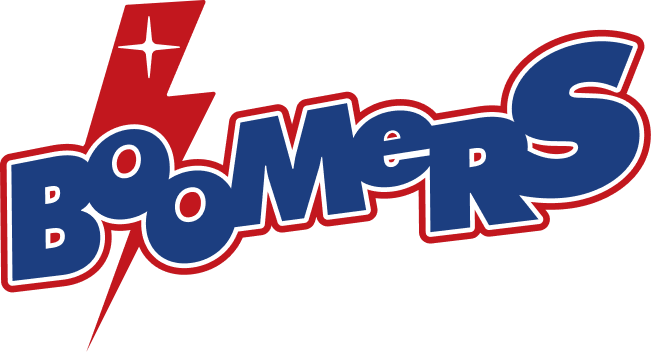
- Type: Private
- Industry: Family entertainment centers
- Founded: 1998
- Founder: Alexander Weber Jr.
- Headquarters: Boca Raton, Florida, U.S.
- Number of locations: 8
- Area served: United States
- Key people: Tim Murphy (CEO)
- Owner: APX Operating Company, LLC. Lucky Strike Entertainment Corporation
- Website: www.boomersparks.com

Boomers Parks (stylized Boomers! until 2018) is a chain of family entertainment centers which feature indoor activities such as carousels, kiddie swings, restaurants, and video game arcades, and outdoor activities such as miniature golf, kiddie rides, bumper boats, batting cages, go-karts, kiddie roller coasters, and laser tag. The Modesto and Irvine locations each have a ride called the Flamethrower.

== History ==
The first Boomers was opened in 1994 in Boca Raton, Florida by four business men, Joseph Ballarini, a Boca Raton businessman; P.J. Orthwein and James Orthwein Jr., who own Double Eagle Distributing, an Anheuser-Busch distributorship in Deerfield Beach; and Bob Mullin, also a local business man. The name Boomers was a play on BOOM, the acronym formed from the original partners’ last names.

The former Huish Family Fun Centers and Bullwinkle's Restaurant locations in Anaheim, El Cajon, Escondido, Fountain Valley, San Diego, Upland, and Medford were sold to Palace Entertainment by 2001. These rebranded to Boomers and removing the Rocky and Bullwinkle theming (except for Medford, which was mostly intact until that location's closure in 2020).

Boomers became a DBA name by the Palace Entertainment chain in 2001, which resulted from the merger of several entertainment centers, including Camelot Parks, Palace Park, Boomers!, Grand Prix Race-O-Rama, and Family Fun Center. The official slogan of the formerly Palace-owned Boomers! Parks is "Where Family Fun Rules!".

In September 2014, Apex Parks Group purchased 10 Boomers locations from Palace Entertainment. In 2015, Apex Parks Group rebranded one of the last Mountasia Family Fun Centers to a Boomers. Closure of the Fresno and Houston locations in later years has resulted in 9 total Boomers parks currently owned by Apex Parks Group.

On April 8, 2020, Apex Parks Group announced it was filing for Chapter 11 bankruptcy and undergoing a financial restructuring.

On June 8, 2020, Boomers announced that they would be closing locations in El Cajon, California, Upland, California, and Kearny Mesa, California. The Fountain Valley, California location also has closed down.

After restructuring Apex Parks Group would become Boomers Parks. In addition to owning six Boomers! locations the company also owns Big Kahuna's water park in Destin, Florida, and West Berlin, New Jersey.

In early 2025, Herschend Family Entertainment acquired Palace Entertainment, including Palace's remaining Boomers locations in Palm Springs, California and Vista, California. By July 2025, however, Herschend sold these two locations to the Lucky Strike Entertainment Corporation.

== Operating Boomers! Branded Locations ==
Name	Location	Former name	Owner	Notes
Boomers! Boca Raton	Boca Raton, Florida	Boca Raton Airport	Boomers Parks	The original Boomers! park.
Boomers! Irvine	Irvine, California	Palace Park	Boomers Parks	
Boomers! Livermore	Livermore, California	Camelot Park	Boomers Parks	
Boomers! Modesto	Modesto, California	Camelot Park	Boomers Parks	
Boomers! Santa Maria	Santa Maria, California	Camelot Park	Boomers Parks	
Boomers! Palm Springs	Palm Springs, California	Camelot Park	Lucky Strike Entertainment	
Boomers! Visalia	Visalia, California	Adventure Park	Lucky Strike Entertainment	
Boomers! Vista	Vista, California	Vista Family Fun Center	Lucky Strike Entertainment	

== Former Boomers! Locations ==
Name	Location	Former name	Owner (While under the Boomers! Brand)	Notes	Current Status
Boomers! Anaheim	Anaheim, California	Family Fun Center	Palace Entertainment	Located next to Camelot Golfland, closed in 2004 and was later replaced with warehouses.	Demolished
Boomers! Bakersfield	Bakersfield, California	Camelot Park	Palace Entertainment	Sold in 2004 and later rebranded back to Camelot Park.	Now MB2
Boomers! Dania Beach	Dania Beach, Florida	Grand Prix Race-O-Rama	Palace Entertainment	Closed January 25, 2015. Located next to the Dania Beach Hurricane roller coaster, which closed in 2011. The roller coaster was owned and operated separately from the park. The site was demolished to become a new shopping plaza.	Demolished
Boomers! El Cajon	El Cajon, California	El Cajon Family Fun Center	Apex Parks Group	Closed June 8, 2020. Demolition of the main building and mini golf course began in early March 2022.	Demolished
Boomers! Escondido	Escondido, California	Family Fun Center	Palace Entertainment	Sold in 2004 and later replaced by a Car Max dealership.	Demolished
Boomers! Fountain Valley	Fountain Valley, California	Fountain Valley Family Fun Center	Apex Parks Group	Closed June 8, 2020. Demolished March 16, 2021, as the materials used to construct the building contained asbestos.	Demolished
Boomers! Fresno	Fresno, California	Camelot Park	Apex Parks Group	Demolished September 4, 2017. The property is now occupied by Living Spaces.	Demolished
Boomers! Houston	Houston, Texas	Mountasia	Apex Parks Group	Rebranded to Boomers in 2015, Closed February 2020.	Closed
Boomers! Los Angeles	City of Industry, California	SpeedZone Los Angeles	Apex Parks Group	Closed October 6, 2025.	Closed
Boomers! Long Island	Medford, New York	Bullwinkle's Family Food N' Fun	Palace Entertainment	Has not been updated since September 2019 and was removed from Palace Entertainment's website in 2020. The park is currently abandoned. Also known as Boomers! Medford	Abandoned
Boomers! San Diego	San Diego, California	San Diego Family Fun Center	Apex Parks Group	Closed on June 8, 2020, after Apex Parks Group filed for bankruptcy. Reopened on September 5, 2020, as Huish's Family Fun Center San Diego, owned by Bullwinkle's Entertainment, which formerly operated the property and owned the land. This location permanently closed on January 4, 2022, and was demolished.	Demolished
Boomers! Upland	Upland, California	Upland Family Fun Center	Apex Parks Group	Closed June 8, 2020. Reopened as Bullwinkle's Entertainment on December 10, 2021.	Operating
