= Family entertainment center =

Small amusement park marketed toward families

A family entertainment center (FEC) in the entertainment industry, also known as an indoor amusement park, family amusement center, family fun center, soft play, or simply fun center, is a small amusement park marketed towards families with small children to teenagers, often entirely indoors. They usually cater to "sub-regional markets of larger metropolitan areas." FECs are generally small compared to full-scale amusement parks, with fewer attractions, a lower per-person per-hour cost to consumers than a traditional amusement park, and not usually major tourist attractions, but sustained by an area customer base. Many are locally owned and operated, although there are a number of chains and franchises in the field. Some, operated by non-profit organizations as children's museums or science museums, tend to be geared toward edutainment experiences rather than simply amusement.

== History ==
FECs are essentially a converged outgrowth of theme restaurants that increasingly developed their in-house amusement features, small-scale amusement parks needing more offerings than just a few rides and midway games, and diversifying formerly one-attraction venues (water parks, skate parks, billiard halls, bowling alleys, and so on). All four categories have moved over several decades continually toward stock, popular entertainment solutions supplied by third-party vendors. Chuck E. Cheese, opened in 1977 as Chuck E. Cheese's Pizza Time Theatre in San Jose, California, was one of the earliest widely known examples of these in the United States.

== Attractions ==
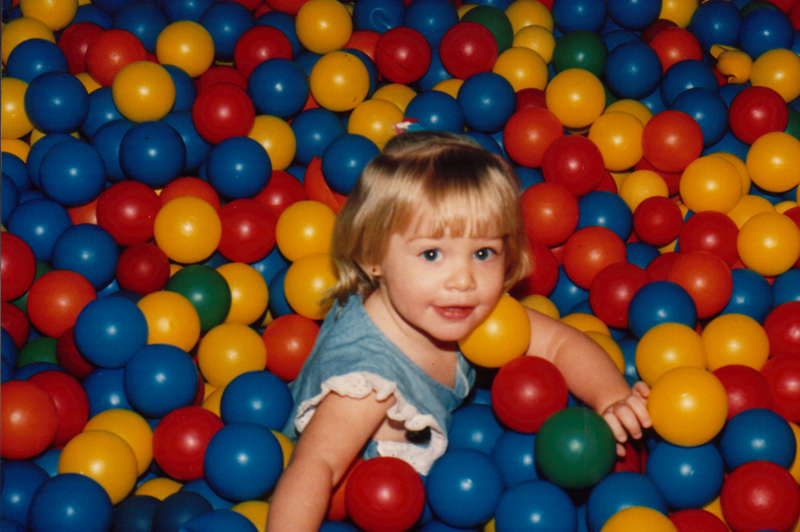
Ball pits are a popular attraction at family fun centers.

Most FECs have at least five common major or "anchor" attractions, to provide diverse patrons (often in large parties) at least one to two hours of entertainment, to encourage repeat visits, and to reduce time spent waiting for any given attraction. Some of the more usual attractions include (depending upon size, climate, etc.):

- Amusement/thrill rides (elevated, but generally small-scale)
- Animatronics displays
- Arcade games
- Ball pit
- Batting cages
- Bowling alley
- Bumper boats
- Restaurant
- Food: Snack bar and fast food (often pizza)
- Food: Quality family and group dining in theme restaurant
- Inflatables
- Kiddie rides (ground-level)
- Kart racing
- Laser tag
- Miniature golf
- Movie theater
- Music and dancing
- Playground equipment and climbing structures
- Redemption games and merchandiser games
- Roller skating
- Specialty stores (toys, comics, music, etc.)
- Tube maze
- Virtual reality
- Water slide

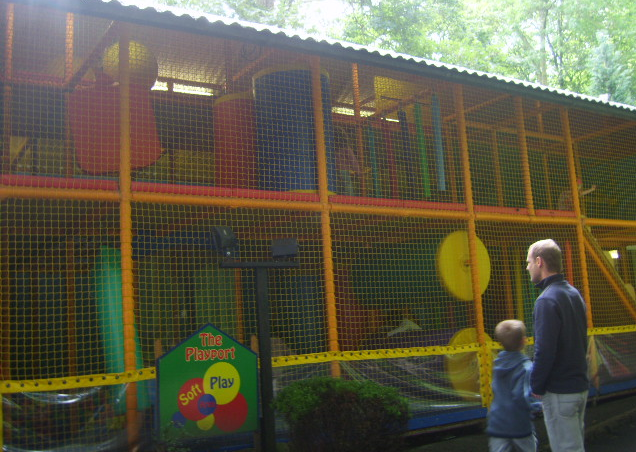
Multi-tiered climbing structures such as this one are common at family entertainment centers.

The most common anchor activities are miniature golf, kart racing, arcade and redemption games, and food & beverages, according to industry specialists StoneCreek Partners. FECs rarely use custom-built attractions, because of the costs involved, and instead install off-the-shelf systems provided and maintained by industry equipment vendors.

Any given FEC may lean more towards outdoor activities, arcade gaming, or passive entertainment and dining. Each may cater to different age ranges, all the time, or during certain hours, e.g., children and entire families in the daytime, and teens to young adults in the evening, with specific promotional programs to attract different market segments at different times.

== Business model ==
FECs tend to serve "sub-regional markets", such as small cities, quadrants or boroughs of larger cities, and a large suburban area outside such a city. Their busiest times are weekend afternoons and Thursday through Saturday evenings.

Because most of the attractions are essentially the same from FEC to FEC, two of the most important factors in a particular center distinguishing itself to potential customers are a highly visible location (hard to obtain because other uses for the land are often more competitive), and a consistently developed and promoted theme that appeals to the target market segments, "the fun factor in the overall decor".

Parental concerns are also important. While children themselves rarely think of it, a major factor in the attractiveness of an FEC to parents is on-site safety and security, as adults may drop off older children at such an establishment to entertain themselves. An increasingly important factor for success is high-quality food and drink to attract parental spending as well as whole-family dining.

== Non-traditional FECs ==
Various major media and entertainment brands, including Disney, Lego, NASCAR, Sega, Sony, United Artists/Regal and Viacom, have been attached to family entertainment centers, often much less "traditional" than local and chain FECs, with custom-built, unique attractions, usually heavily branded, and most often located in major metropolitan areas. The first such urban entertainment center (UEC) was the Universal CityWalk in Los Angeles, California, which opened in 1993, linking several Universal properties. Including various retail outlets, restaurants, and attractions, the CityWalk created a great deal of "sustained buzz" in the retail real estate industry, which began "embracing the notion that Universal Studios, Sony, Disney, and other entertainment companies could create new anchors and entertainment programs for shopping centers". Another significant UEC was the Sony Metreon in San Francisco, California (1999–2006).

Some nonprofit, educational installations, such as the Exploratorium in San Francisco, also have aspects of FECs in format and atmosphere, but with activities geared toward learning and experiencing rather than simple entertainment. Some for-profit enterprises also use this model, or mix edutainment with simpler amusement attractions.

== In Canada ==
- Chuck E. Cheese (U.S.-owned)
- Galaxyland at West Edmonton Mall (formerly named Fantasyland)
- Playdium
- The Rec Room

== In Indonesia ==
- Fun World (Jakarta)
- Trans Studio Makassar (Makassar, South Sulawesi)

== In Mexico ==
- KidZania (Mexico City, 1999)
- America's Incredible Pizza Company (Monterrey, U.S.-owned)
- Chuck E. Cheese

== In the United Kingdom ==
- The Living Rainforest
- Water World, Stoke-on-Trent
- Sea Life London Aquarium
- Madame Tussauds

== In the United States ==
The main national industry group in the U.S. is the National Association of Family Entertainment Centers (NAFEC), which is a division of the International Laser Tag Association (ILTA).

Some U.S.-based companies also have venues in Canada (noted above), but this is rare due to the legal/political difficulties involved in cross-border corporations.

North American FECs vary wildly in themes, size and features. Some of the larger businesses in this category have included:

- Adventuredome
- Adventure Landing (Jacksonville Beach, Florida, 1995)
- America's Incredible Pizza Company (chain, based in Springfield, Missouri, 2002)
- Boomers! Parks (chain)
- Brunswick Zone XL (defunct, bowling/pool/video game chain)
- Bullwinkle's
- Bowlero
  - AMF Bowling
  - Bowlmor Lanes
  - Lucky Strike Lanes
- Castle Park
- Celebration Station (chain)
- Chuck E. Cheese (chain, based in San Jose, California, 1977)
- Club Disney (defunct)
- Crayola Experience
- Dave & Buster's (Dallas, Texas, 1982)
- Discovery Zone (Lenexa, Kansas, 1990)
- Disney Junior Play Zone
- DisneyQuest (defunct)
- Disney Springs (Urban Entertainment Center)
- Downtown Disney (Urban Entertainment Center)
- Fun Spot America Theme Parks
  - Kissimmee, Florida
  - Orlando
- GameWorks (Seattle, Washington, 1997)
- Mr. Gatti's Pizza
- Golfland Sunsplash (full waterpark and miniature golf course with FEC section, California and Arizona)
- John's Incredible Pizza Company (1997)
- Jeepers! (defunct)
- KidZania
- Legoland Discovery Center (Schaumburg, Illinois, 2008)
- Malibu Grand Prix
- Main Event Entertainment
- Mountasia Family Fun Centers
- NASCAR Speedpark (NASCAR racing theme; four U.S. locations)
- Nickelodeon Universe
- Peter Piper Pizza (chain)
- Putt-Putt Fun Center
- Regal FunScape (chain; movies, minigolf, video & "VR" games, food court, etc., depending on location)
- Round1 Bowling and Amusement and Spo-Cha (chain, Japan-owned)
- Scandia Amusement Park (full amusement park with FEC section, California)
- Sesame Street Learn & Play
- Sky Zone (chain, indoor trampoline park; locations in US and Canada)
- SpeedZone
- Sony Metreon (Urban Entertainment Center, San Francisco, California, 1999–2006, Japan-owned)
- Stars and Strikes Family Entertainment Center
- The Game Room powered by Hasbro
- Tilt Studio (chain, an offshoot of the original Tilt arcade chain)
- United Skates of America (roller skating rink chain, founded 1971)
- Universal Studios Hollywood (Los Angeles, California, 1993)
- Universal Orlando Resort (Orlando, Florida, 1999)
  - Universal CityWalk Hollywood and Universal CityWalk Orlando (Urban Entertainment Center)
- Universal Horror Unleashed (Las Vegas)
- uWink (2007)
- Urban Air Adventure Parks (2011)
- Wannado City (defunct)
- ZDT's Amusement Park (full amusement park with FEC section, Texas)

== In other countries ==
- Entertainment City (Manila Bay, Philippines)
- Happy City (Colombia)
- Round1 (Japan)
- Sega Republic (Dubai, United Arab Emirates 2009, Japan-owned but closed down)
- Universal CityWalk Osaka (part of Universal Studios Japan, Osaka, U.S.-owned)
- Universal CityWalk Beijing (part of Universal Beijing Resort)
- Joypolis (Japan)
- Dazzeland (Adelaide, Australia 1991-1998, now closed)
- SuperPark (Finland)
- Timezone (Australia, New Zealand, Asia)

== See also ==
- Entertainment
- Performing arts
- Performing arts education
