= Dania Beach, Florida =

City in Broward County, Florida, United States

- City
- City of Dania Beach
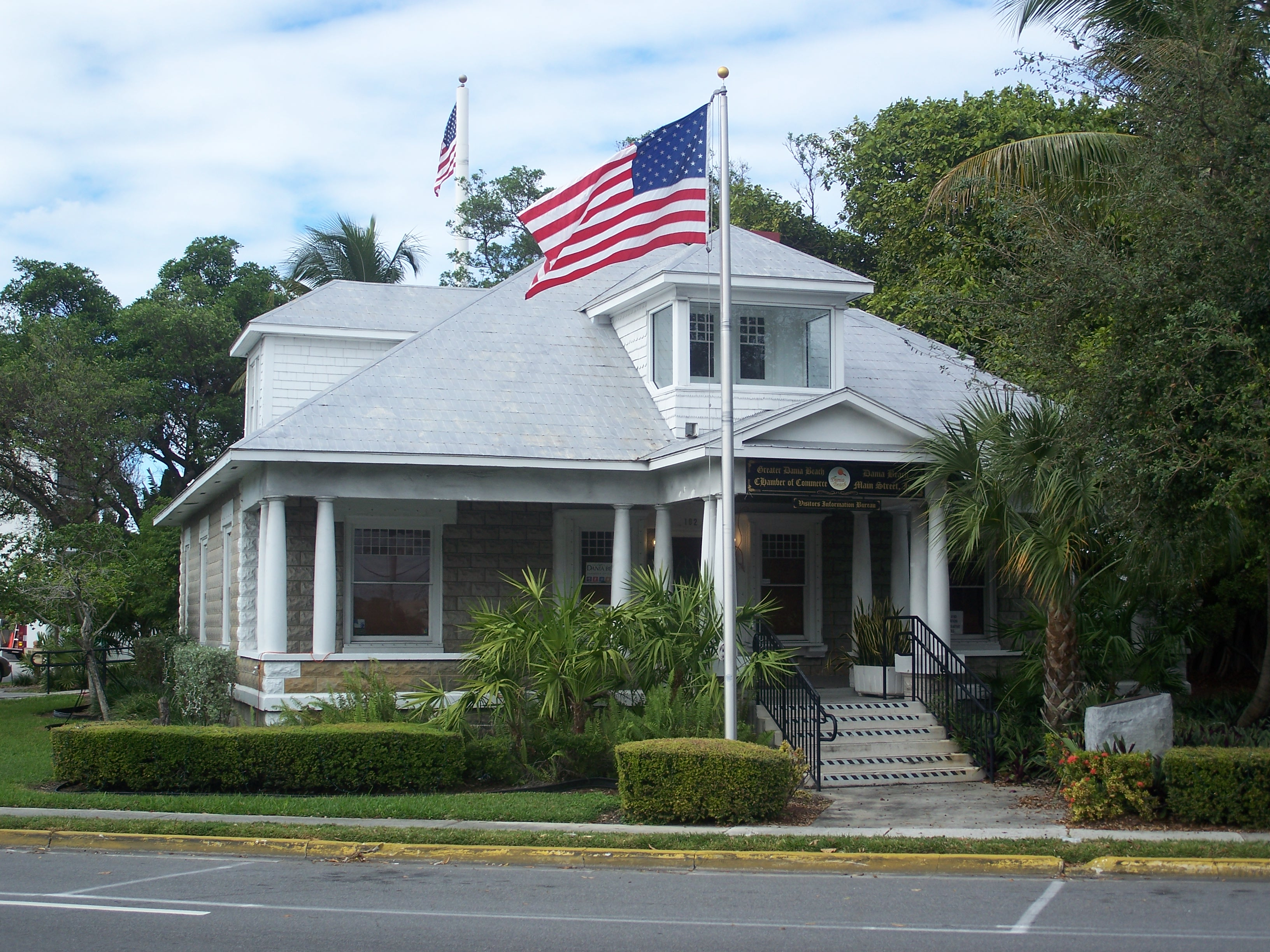
- Nyberg-Swanson House, now home to the local Chamber of Commerce

- Logo
- Nickname: "The Antique Capital of the South"
- Motto(s): "Broward's First City" "Sea it. Live it. Love it."
- Location of Dania Beach in Broward County, Florida

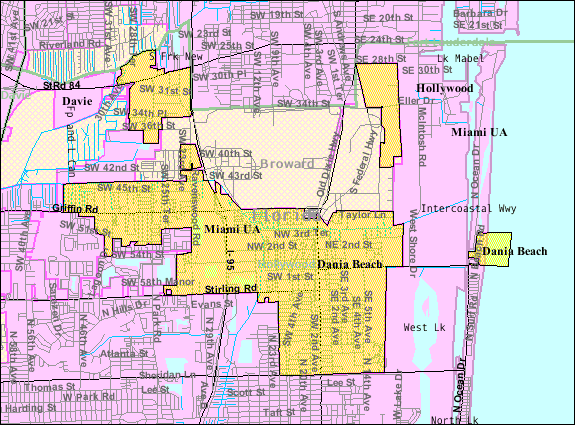
- City boundaries prior to 2001 annexation
- Coordinates: 26°03′28″N 80°08′15″W
- Country: United States
- State: Florida
- County: Broward
- Settled (Modello): c. 1898–1899
- Incorporated (Town of Dania): November 30, 1904
- Incorporated (City of Dania): June 06, 1927
- Incorporated (City of Dania Beach): November 03, 1998

Government
  - Type: Commission-Manager
  - Body: Dania Beach City Commission

Area
  - Total: 8.35 sq mi (21.62 km^{2})
  - Land: 7.83 sq mi (20.28 km^{2})
  - Water: 0.52 sq mi (1.34 km^{2}) 3.04%
- Elevation: 10 ft (3.0 m)

Population (2020)
  - Total: 31,723
  - Density: 4,051.3/sq mi (1,564.23/km^{2})
- Time zone: UTC-5 (EST)
  - Summer (DST): UTC-4 (EDT)
- ZIP code: 33004
- Area codes: 754, 954
- FIPS code: 12-16335
- GNIS feature ID: 2404182
- Website: www.daniabeachfl.gov

Dania Beach (known until 1998 as Dania) is a city in Broward County, Florida, United States. It is part of the Miami metropolitan area. As of the 2020 census, the city's population was 31,723.

Dania Beach is home to Dania Pointe, a shopping and entertainment center in its downtown district. Dania Beach is the location of one of the largest jai alai frontons in the United States, The Casino @ Dania Beach (Dania Jai Alai).

It was formerly the location for two amusement centers; one named Boomers! (formerly Grand Prix Race-O-Rama), which housed the Dania Beach Hurricane roller coaster, and the other being Pirates World amusement park, which was featured in Barry Mahon's Thumbelina. It is also home to the International Game Fish Association Hall of Fame and Museum.

== History ==
The area was started as a neighborhood called Modello in the late 19th century. In November 1904, the area was incorporated as the "Town of Dania," because most of the 35 residents were farmers of Danish ancestry. On January 4, 1926, Dania voted to annex itself to the City of Hollywood.

After the September 1926 Miami hurricane decimated Hollywood's fortunes, most of Dania seceded from the City of Hollywood and reincorporated as a city. The areas that chose to remain part of the City of Hollywood caused Dania's current noncontinuous city boundaries. In November 1998, the "City of Dania" formally changed its name to "City of Dania Beach". The name "Dania" is still commonly used to refer to the city.

In 2001, the city annexed several unincorporated areas of Broward County, increasing its population by about 3,600 people.

Formerly known as the "Tomato Capital of the World," once the city went from a farming settlement to an urban city, it soon took on the name "Antique Capital of the South", due to many antique shops in downtown Dania Beach, especially along Federal Highway, known as the city's "Antique Row".

== Geography ==
The city has a total area of 8.3 sq mi (21.6 km^{2}), of which 0.27 sq mi (0.7 km^{2}) (3.04%) is covered by water.

Dania Beach's boundaries are Fort Lauderdale to the north, Hollywood to the south, Hollywood and the Atlantic Ocean to the east, and Davie along with the Hollywood Seminole Indian Reservation to the west of the city.

Dania Beach is adjacent to Fort Lauderdale-Hollywood International Airport.

=== Climate ===
Dania Beach has a tropical climate, similar to the climate found in much of the Caribbean. It is part of the only region in the 48 contiguous states that falls under that category. More specifically, it generally has a tropical rainforest climate (Köppen climate classification: Af), bordering a tropical monsoon climate (Köppen climate classification: Am)

== Demographics ==
Historical population
Census	Pop.	Note	%±
1910	369		—
1920	762		106.5%
1930	1,674		119.7%
1940	2,902		73.4%
1950	4,540		56.4%
1960	7,065		55.6%
1970	9,013		27.6%
1980	11,796		30.9%
1990	13,024		10.4%
2000	20,061		54.0%
2010	29,639		47.7%
2020	31,723		7.0%
U.S. Decennial Census

=== Racial and ethnic composition ===
Dania Beach racial composition (Hispanics excluded from racial categories) (NH = Non-Hispanic)
Race	Pop 2010	Pop 2020	% 2010	% 2020
White (NH)	15,580	13,368	52.57%	42.14%
Black or African American (NH)	6,205	6,443	20.94%	20.31%
Native American or Alaska Native (NH)	69	86	0.23%	0.27%
Asian (NH)	606	668	2.04%	2.11%
Pacific Islander or Native Hawaiian (NH)	14	28	0.05%	0.09%
Some other race (NH)	97	292	0.33%	0.92%
Two or more races/Multiracial (NH)	416	962	1.40%	3.03%
Hispanic or Latino (any race)	6,652	9,876	22.44%	31.13%
Total	29,639	31,723	100.00%	100.00%

=== 2020 census ===
As of the 2020 census, Dania Beach had a population of 31,723. The median age was 42.2 years. 19.0% of residents were under the age of 18 and 16.8% of residents were 65 years of age or older. For every 100 females there were 96.5 males, and for every 100 females age 18 and over there were 94.0 males age 18 and over.

100.0% of residents lived in urban areas, while 0.0% lived in rural areas.

There were 13,422 households in Dania Beach, of which 26.3% had children under the age of 18 living in them. Of all households, 34.3% were married-couple households, 24.4% were households with a male householder and no spouse or partner present, and 32.7% were households with a female householder and no spouse or partner present. About 31.7% of all households were made up of individuals and 11.1% had someone living alone who was 65 years of age or older.

There were 16,377 housing units, of which 18.0% were vacant. The homeowner vacancy rate was 2.2% and the rental vacancy rate was 8.7%.

Racial composition as of the 2020 census
Race	Number	Percent
White	15,568	49.1%
Black or African American	6,661	21.0%
American Indian and Alaska Native	175	0.6%
Asian	708	2.2%
Native Hawaiian and Other Pacific Islander	31	0.1%
Some other race	3,071	9.7%
Two or more races	5,509	17.4%
Hispanic or Latino (of any race)	9,876	31.1%

=== 2010 census ===
As of the 2010 United States census, there were 29,639 people, 12,749 households, and 7,578 families residing in the city.

=== 2000 census ===
In 2000, 21.4% had children under 18 living with them, 34.9% were married couples living together, 14.1% had a female householder with no husband present, and 46.0% were not families. About 35.0% of all households were made up of individuals, and 10.8% had someone living alone who was 65 or older. The average household size was 2.19, and the average family size was 2.85.

In 2000, the age distribution was 20.0% under 18, 6.9% from 18 to 24, 31.9% from 25 to 44, 25.1% from 45 to 64, and 16.1% who were 65 or older. The median age was 40 years. For every 100 females, there were 99.6 males. For every 100 females 18 and over, there were 99.4 males.

In 2000, the median income for a household in the city was $34,125, and for a family was $37,405. Males had a median income of $35,081 versus $26,535 for females. The per capita income for the city was $20,795. About 14.6% of families and 18.3% of the population were below the poverty line, including 31.6% of those under age 18 and 16.0% of those age 65 or over.

As of 2000, English as a first language was spoken by 76.85%, while Spanish accounted for 12.38%, French at 4.88%, French Creole at 1.94%, Italian at 1.36%, and Arabic was spoken by 0.80% of the population.

As of 2000, Dania Beach had the 127th-highest percentage of Cuban residents in the US, at 1.69% of the city's population (tied with Fort Lauderdale and Parkland).

== Economy ==
Spirit Airlines was headquartered in Dania Beach at Dania Pointe until the airline ceased operations in 2026. The airline Sun Air International had its headquarters in Dania Beach until it ceased operations in 2016.

American Maritime Officers is headquartered in Dania Beach, as well as Alec Bradley Cigar Co.

Carnival Air Lines, Gulfstream International Airlines, and Chewy.com were formerly headquartered in Dania Beach.

== Education ==
Dania Beach's public schools are operated by the Broward County Public Schools. Its public elementary schools include Collins Elementary School and Dania Elementary School. Olsen Middle School is a local public middle school, and South Broward High School serves the area from neighboring Hollywood, Florida.

During the segregation period, the first school for Black students met in the St. Ruth Missionary Baptist Church.

== Media ==
Dania Beach is a part of the Miami-Fort Lauderdale-Hollywood media market, which is the 12th-largest radio market and the 17th largest television market in the United States. Its primary daily newspapers are the South Florida-Sun Sentinel and The Miami Herald, and their Spanish-language counterparts El Sentinel and El Nuevo Herald.

== Transportation ==
Dania Beach is served by the Fort Lauderdale Airport station on the Tri-Rail. It is also served by several Broward County Transit buses. The Fort Lauderdale-Hollywood International Airport is located in the city of Dania Beach.

== Vervet Monkeys ==
A colony of vervet monkeys has lived around Dania Beach and its mangrove forest since the mid 20th century.
