= St. Ruth Missionary Baptist Church =

Church in Dania Beach, Florida, US

Coordinates: 26°3′20″N 80°8′48″W

St. Ruth Missionary Baptist Church is an historic church in Dania Beach, Florida. Founded by Charlie Chambers in 1908, it was the first black church in Dania and housed the first "colored" school in the town.

The first sanctuary was a small house on NW 4th Avenue, built by "Charlie Chambers along with a few faithful followers...from lumber found in the Atlantic Ocean." He named it after his daughter. The first school class had nine students. The sanctuary was moved in 1920 to NW 5th Avenue. That building was destroyed completely in the 1926 Miami hurricane, but was rebuilt.

Beginning in 1948 W.C. Edcar was the pastor; he retired in 1992. In 1957 there was a new building. In 2016 the pastor was J.C. Howard.
