= Big Kahuna's =

Water park in Destin, Florida, USA

Big Kahuna's Water and Adventure Park
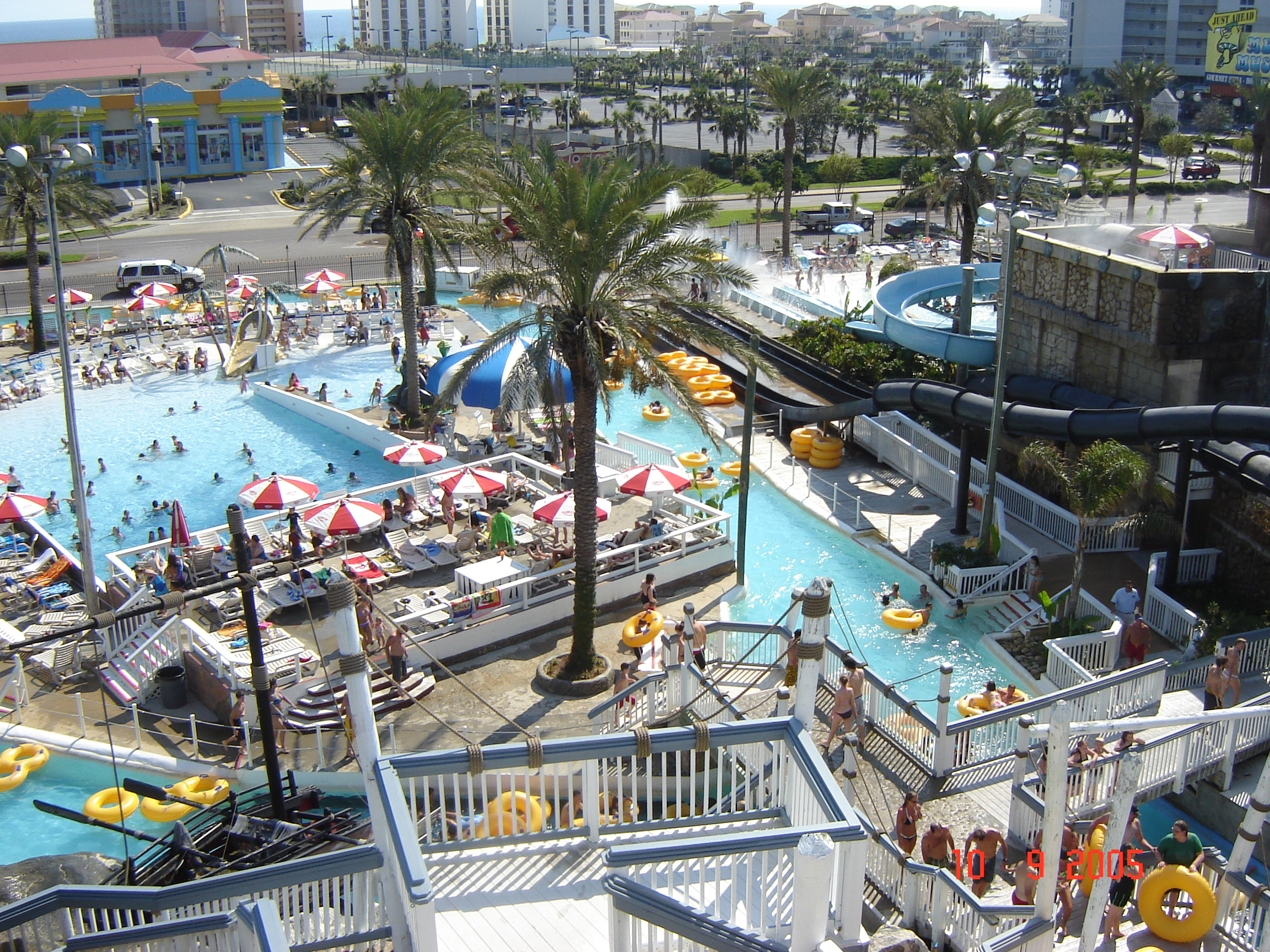
- Location: 1007 US Highway 98 East, Destin, Florida 32541
- Coordinates: 30°23′20″N 86°28′18″W
- Operated by: Boomers Parks
- Opened: 1986

Big Kahuna's Water and Adventure Park is a water park located in Destin, Florida, United States. It opened in 1986. It is primarily a water park, with over 40 attractions, private cabanas, a half pipe for surfing, and flow boarding. The park contains a skycoaster which stands at 100 feet tall, and racing at speeds around 60 miles per hour. It also features several thrill ride attractions and a miniature golf course.

In 2014, the original owners of Big Kahuna's Water and Adventure Park sold to Apex Park Groups, which later went through a financial restructuring and renamed it Boomers! Park.

On July 16, 2019, Big Kahuna's lazy river was shut down by the Okaloosa County Health Department for unsanitary water conditions.

In 2022, parent company Boomers Parks re-branded Sahara Sam's in West Berlin, New Jersey to Big Kahuna's Water Park.
