= Anjappar Chettinad Restaurant =

Restaurants in India

Anjappar Restaurant
- Type: Private
- Industry: Restaurant
- Genre: Chettinad cuisine
- Founded: Chennai, Tamil Nadu, India (1964)
- Founder: Anjappar
- Headquarters: Chennai, India
- Area served: India, Australia, Canada, Kuwait, Malaysia, Oman, Qatar, Bahrain, Singapore, U.A.E, U.K., U.S.A., Saudi Arabia, Thailand, Netherlands, Germany
- Website: www.anjappar.com

Anjappar Chettinad Restaurant is a privately owned Indian casual-dining restaurant chain, founded in Chennai, Tamil Nadu, India in 1964. It now operates over 30 locations in Chennai, Erode, Madurai, Coimbatore, Salem, and Bangalore. Internationally, the franchise has restaurants in Sri Lanka, Singapore, Malaysia, Hong Kong, the Middle East, Australia, the Netherlands and North America.

Anjappar offers South Indian cuisine, particularly focusing on producing Chettinad-style preparations, while some locations additionally offer Sri Lankan, Oriental and Middle East dishes.
