= Bumper boats =

Amusement park boat ride

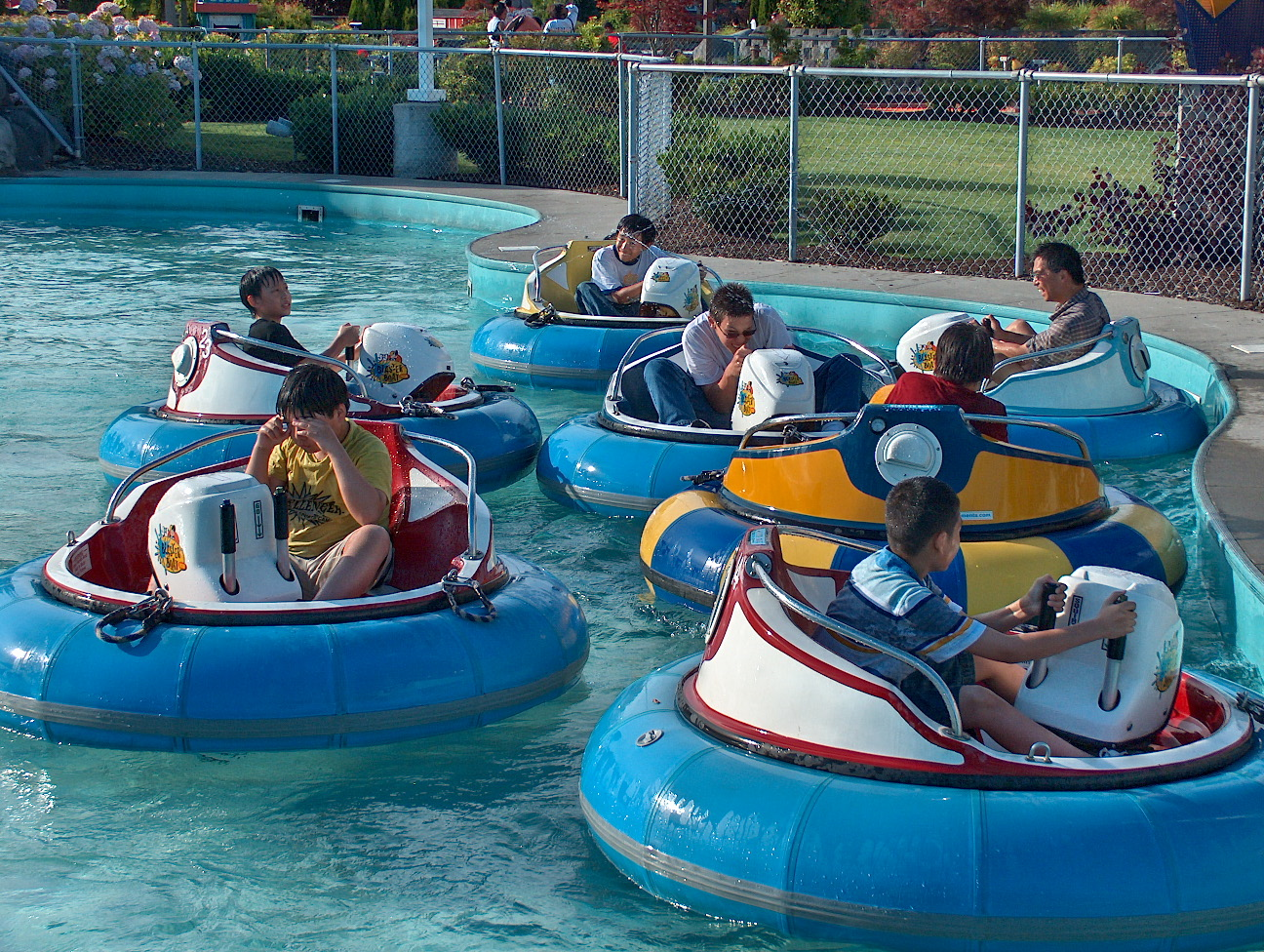
Bumper boats at a family fun center

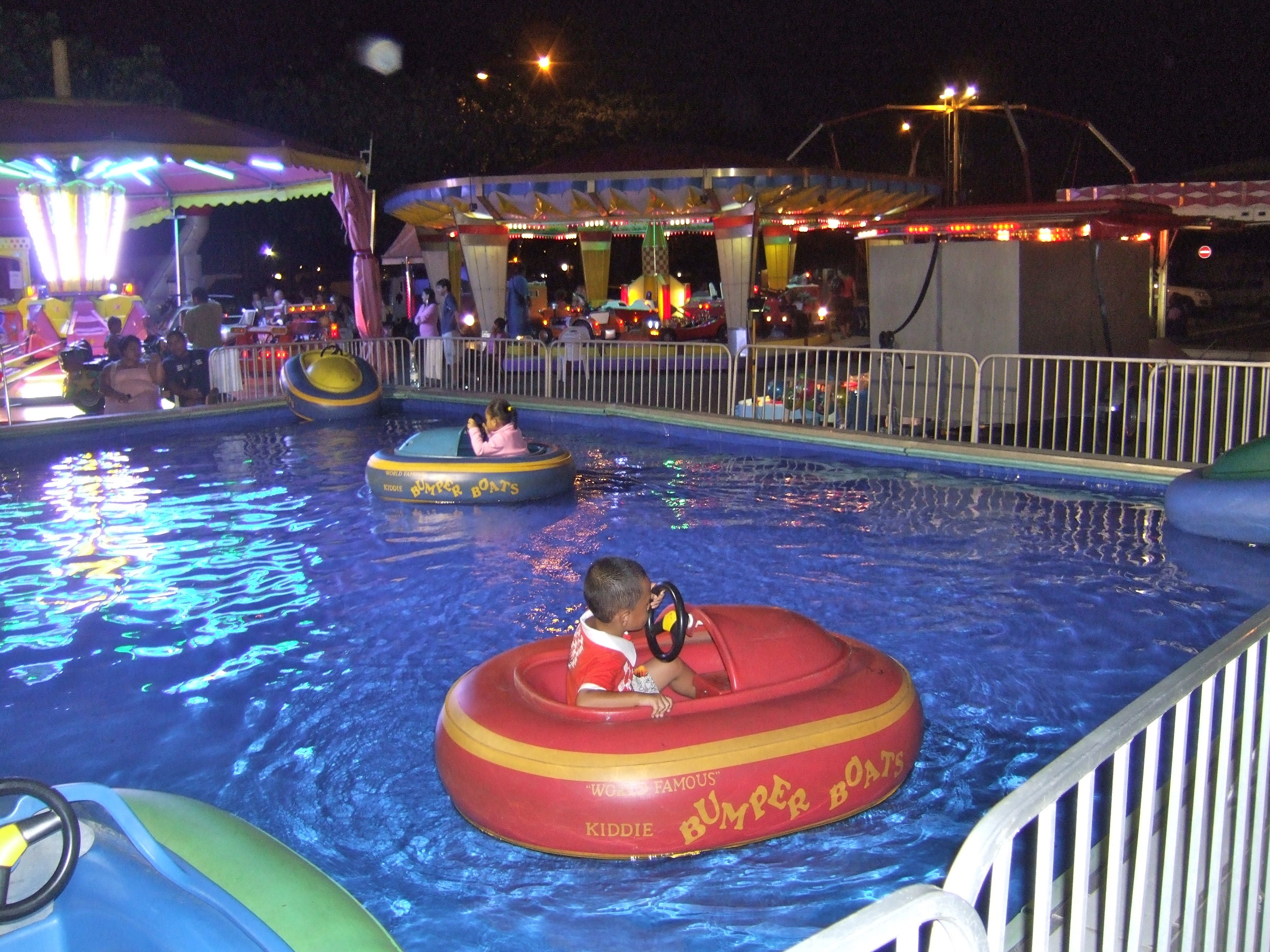
Children's bumper boats in Nouméa, New Caledonia, 2011

Bumper boats are an amusement park ride that uses inner tube shaped watercraft that can be steered by the rider. Some are driven by electric motors, some by gasoline engines, and some require the rider to propel the craft by pedaling. Most are equipped with water guns for duels with other riders. Bumper boat attractions can commonly be found in places such as amusement parks, carnivals, fairs, family fun centers, and theme parks.

== Description ==
Bumper boats are an amusement ride in which people drive small boats in a pool or pond and try to crash into each other for fun. In a patent application related to the ride, its inventor wrote, "one of the thrills of operating amusement park boats of this type is to initiate collisions with other similar boat within a relatively confined pool." The small boats can hold one or two people and have oversized fenders that resemble a large tractor tire inner tube. The boats are powered by either electric or gasoline engines.

== Bumper boat invention ==
Edward A. Morgan, co-founder of amusement park ride manufacturer Arrow Development Company, invented bumper boats in the early 1970s. Morgan applied for a U.S. patent on the ride in 1972. The U.S. government granted the patent in 1974. The patent includes detailed design and construction guidelines, including a maximum speed of four miles per hour and circular shock absorbers around the boat to protect riders.

== History ==
Bumper boats are similar in concept to the much older and more ubiquitous bumper cars. Like bumper boats, the point of bumper cars is to collide with other cars. Bumper cars date to the early 1920s. Bumper car collisions tend to be more jarring than bumper boats.

Arrow Development Company, later known as Arrow Dynamics, was the original maker and patent owner of the bumper boats ride. Arrow was founded in 1946 by Edward Morgan and Karl Bacon as a builder of carousels and other rides. The company's fortunes took off when Walt Disney hired it to build many of Disneyland's original rides, such as Snow White's Adventures and Casey Jr. Circus Train. The company gradually became mostly a roller coaster maker over the years. It went bankrupt in 2001. Rival ride maker S&S Power bought Arrow that year and maintains S&S Arrow as a division today. It primarily makes roller coasters.

Another idea spawned during the decade of the 1930s was the "Dodgem Motor Boats." Like the Dodgem car, the boats were operator driven and seated two adults. As the Dodgem car had given many a first opportunity to "get behind the wheel of a car," so the boats gave many their first chance to operate a powerboat. Streamlined and slick in appearance, the powerboats were designed to give both driver and passenger the feeling of a luxury ride in a lake or lagoon.

A brief eyewitness description of the boats constructed for this new ride was written in July 1932:

Visited Amesbury with Markey and looked over his new Dodgem boat which is a very nice looking job. It is considerably longer than the water skooter made by Lusse [Company] and built on a different principal. These are made all of wood. This, if it operates satisfactorily, should prove a very nice boat.

Certainly the most elaborate early boat installation was done for the Chicago World's Fair in 1933. Another elaborate and memorable Dodgem boat installation was constructed six years later for the 1939 New York World's Fair. For this national event, the Dodgem Corporation teamed up with the Philadelphia Toboggan Company (PTC). Not only did they jointly operate a boat ride but also two Dodgem car rides. Both Dodgem and PTC were to have equal shares. Two buildings valued at $27,500 were to be put up by and mortgaged to the PTC, and Dodgem was to supply fifty cars valued at $20,000. For the boat ride, PTC was apparently responsible for the construction of a channel. How many boats were constructed or how profitable the three rides were is unclear.

As to the popularity of boat rides, William Ford, who worked for Lusse Company after the boat craze had passed, reported:

They [boat rides] were very popular up to and after the second world war when operators wanted more space and had to get rid of the required lakes and artificial lagoons. Also, the price of gas went up as well as anti-pollution laws, which were forced on them [park owners] because of the filthy water that was in the lagoons. . . .

Evidence suggests that Dodgem was out of the boat business by the time of the war. An expensive ride to install, outfit, and maintain, especially if a man-made lagoon was required, Dodgem motorboats were not destined to be the stellar performers that the cars proved to be.

Elaborate boat rides would not return to the amusement park scene until Walt Disney and the development of theme parks in the late 1950s and early 1960s began to bring the likes of paddle wheelers and other large craft back to grand-scale manmade waterways.

== Bumper boats today ==
Several companies still make bumper boats today. These companies include Barcachoc bumperboats, J&J Amusements, Foster Manufacturing Corporation and Bumper Boats Inc. Today's bumper boats include some added features, such as mounted water guns for shooting opposing boat drivers.

== See also ==
- Bumper cars
