= 1920 in animation =

Events in 1920 in animation.

== Events ==
=== February ===
- February 8: J.R. Bray and Goldwyn Pictures release The Debut of Thomas Cat, the first animated cartoon in color.

== Films released ==
- 4 January – Farmer Al Falfa Goes A-Hunting (United States)
- 16 January – The Great Cheese Robbery (United States)
- 25 January – A Frolic with Felix (United States)
- 30 January – Love's Labor Lost (United States)
- 8 February – The Debut of Thomas Cat (United States)
- 22 February – Felix the Big Game Hunter (United States)
- 3 March – The Best Mouse Loses (United States)
- 7 March – Wrecking a Romeo (United States)
- 14 March – The Bone of Contention (United States)
- 11 April – Felix the Food Controller (United States)
- 18 April – Felix the Pinch Hitter (United States)
- 16 May – Foxy Felix (United States)
- 4 June – Kats Is Kats (United States)
- 6 June – A Hungry Hoodoo (United States)
- 12 June – Cheating the Piper (United States)
- 13 June – The Great Cheese Robbery (United States)
- 3 July – The Chinese Honeymoon (United States)
- 18 July – Felix and the Feed Bag (United States)
- 22 August – Nifty Nurse (United States)
- 26 September – Frolics at the Circus view (United States)
- 24 October – My Hero (United States)
- 25 October – A Family Affair (United States)
- 21 November – Felix the Landlord (United States)
- 26 December – Felix's Fish Story (United States)

== Births ==
=== January ===
- January 1: Osvaldo Cavandoli, Italian cartoonist (creator of La Linea), (d. 2007).
- January 6: Henry Corden, American actor (voice of Paw Rugg in The Hillbilly Bears, Ookla the Mok in Thundarr the Barbarian, continued voice of Fred Flintstone), (d. 2005).
- January 20: DeForest Kelley, American actor (voice of Dr. Leonard McCoy in Star Trek: The Animated Series, Viking 1 in The Brave Little Toaster Goes to Mars), (d. 1999).

=== February ===
- February 14: Albert Barillé, Polish-French animator, screenwriter and film producer (Procidis, Once Upon a Time...), (d. 2009).
- February 17: Ivo Caprino, Norwegian director and writer (Flaklypa Grand Prix), (d. 2001).
- February 22: Pete Alvarado, American comics artist and animator (Walt Disney Company, Warner Bros. Cartoons, DePatie-Freleng, Republic Pictures, Hanna-Barbera, Ruby-Spears Productions, Filmation), (d. 2003).

=== March ===
- March 3:
  - James Doohan, Canadian actor (voice of Scotty in Star Trek: The Animated Series), (d. 2005).
  - Ronald Searle, English illustrator, cartoonist and comics artist (The Happiest Days of Your Life, Energetically Yours, Those Magnificent Men in their Flying Machines, Monte Carlo or Bust!, and Dick Deadeye, or Duty Done), (d. 2011).
- March 14: Hank Ketcham, American comics artist and animator (Walt Disney Company, Walter Lantz), (d. 2001).
- March 22:
  - Ross Martin, American actor (voice of Punchy for Hawaiian Punch, Andy Stevenson in The Man from Button Willow, Dr. Paul Williams in Sealab 2020, Agent 000 in The Robonic Stooges), (d. 1981).
  - Werner Klemperer, German-American actor, stage entertainer and singer (voice of Haman in The Greatest Adventure: Stories from the Bible episode "Queen Esther", Colonel Klink in The Simpsons episode "The Last Temptation of Homer"), (d. 2000).

=== April ===
- April 2: Jack Stokes, English animator and film director (Yellow Submarine, Roobarb), (d. 2013).
- April 14: Sheldon Moldoff, American comics artist and animator (Courageous Cat and Minute Mouse), (d. 2012).
- April 21: Bob Moore, American animator and comics artist (worked for Walter Lantz and Walt Disney Animation), (d. 2001).

=== May ===
- May 8: Saul Bass, American graphic designer (swirling star logo for Hanna-Barbera), and filmmaker (Why Man Creates), (d. 1996).
- May 22: Millie Goldsholl, American film director and producer (Up Is Down), (d. 2012).
- May 26: Peggy Lee, American singer and actress (voice of Darling, Si and Am, and Peg in Lady and the Tramp), (d. 2002).

=== June ===
- June 5:
  - Harold Whitaker, English animator and comics artist (Animal Farm), (d. 2013).
  - Jack Manning, American comics artist and animator (Walt Disney Company, Hanna-Barbera), (d. 1986).
- June 13:
  - Joseph Bau, Polish-Israeli artist, philosopher, comedian, poet and animator, (d. 2002).
  - Rex Everhart, American actor (voice of Maurice in Beauty and the Beast), (d. 2000).
- June 19: Johnny Douglas, English composer (Marvel Productions), (d. 2003).
- June 22: Paul Frees, American actor and screenwriter (voice of Boris Badenov in Rocky and Bullwinkle, Inspector Fenwick in Dudley Do-Right, Ludwig von Drake in Disney anthology television series, Muscles in Jerry's Cousin, John Lennon and George Harrison in The Beatles, Burgermeister Meisterburger and Grimsley in Santa Claus Is Comin' to Town), (d. 1986).
- June 29: Ray Harryhausen, American animator and special effects creator (Mighty Joe Young, The Beast from 20,000 Fathoms, The 7th Voyage of Sinbad, Jason and the Argonauts, Clash of the Titans), (d. 2013).

=== July ===
- July 20:
  - Dick N. Lucas, American animator (Walt Disney Company), (d. 1997).
  - Keith Andes, American actor (voice of Birdman in Birdman and the Galaxy Trio), (d. 2005).

=== August ===
- August 2: Bill Scott, American actor (voice of Bullwinkle J. Moose, Mister Peabody, Dudley Do-Right, Super Chicken, and George of the Jungle, voice of Moosel in The Wuzzles, Gruffi Tummi, Sir Tuxford, and Toadwart in Gummi Bears), (d. 1985).
- August 11: Mike Douglas, American singer, television host and actor (singing voice of Prince Charming in Cinderella), (d. 2006).
- August 18: Lev Milchin, Russian film director and illustrator (The Tale of Tsar Saltan), (d. 1987).
- August 26: Emil Cadkin, American composer SpongeBob SquarePants, Ren & Stimpy: Adult Party Cartoon, Camp Lazlo, The Mighty B!), (d. 2020).
- August 30: Leonid Shvartsman, Russian animator and visual artist (Soyuzmultfilm), (d. 2022).

=== September ===
- September 3: Jackson Weaver, American broadcaster and actor (voice of Smokey Bear), (d. 1992).
- September 5: Alex Anderson, American cartoonist (co-creator of Rocky and Bullwinkle, Dudley Do-Right, and Crusader Rabbit), (d. 2010).
- September 20: Jay Ward, American animator and producer (Crusader Rabbit, Rocky and Bullwinkle, Dudley Do-Right, Mr. Peabody and Sherman, Hoppity Hooper, George of the Jungle, Tom Slick, Super Chicken), (d. 1989).
- September 23: Mickey Rooney, American actor (voice of Oswald the Lucky Rabbit in the mid-1930s, Santa Claus in the Rankin/Bass Productions Christmas specials, adult Tod in The Fox and the Hound, Mr. Cherrywood in The Care Bears Movie, Flip in Little Nemo: Adventures in Slumberland, himself in The Simpsons episode "Radioactive Man", and the short producer in the American Dad! episode "A Star is Reborn"), (d. 2014).
- September 27:
  - Tô Hoài, Vietnamese writer, playwright, screenwriter, journalist and animator, (d. 2014).
  - William Conrad, American actor (narrator in Rocky and Bullwinkle), (d. 1994).

=== October ===
- October 5: Vincent DeRosa, American hornist (Mary Poppins, The Simpsons, Tom and Jerry: The Movie, Family Guy), (d. 2022).
- October 13: Albert Hague, German-American songwriter and composer (How the Grinch Stole Christmas!), (d. 2001).

=== November ===
- November 17: George Dunning, Canadian animator and film director (The Beatles, Yellow Submarine, directed the main titles for A Shot in the Dark), (d. 1979).
- November 25: Ricardo Montalbán, Mexican actor (voice of Armando Guitierrez in Freakazoid!, Señor Senior Sr. in Kim Possible, the Head of Council in The Ant Bully, Gone Juan in The Spooktacular New Adventures of Casper, Vartkes in the Buzz Lightyear of Star Command episode "Lone Wolf", El Encantador in the Dora the Explorer episode "The Missing Piece", the Cow in the Family Guy episode "McStroke", General Juanito Pequeño in the American Dad! episode "Moon Over Isla Island"), (d. 2009).

=== December ===
- December 30:
  - René Jodoin, Canadian animation director and producer (founder of the French-language animation studio of the National Film Board of Canada), (d. 2015).
  - Michael Allinson, English-American actor (additional voices in Courage the Cowardly Dog), (d. 2010).
- December 31: Rex Allen, American actor (narrator and voice of the title character in The Saga of Windwagon Smith, the narrator in Charlotte's Web), (d. 1999).

=== Specific date unknown ===
- Balthasar Lippisch, German illustrator, caricaturist, animator and comics artist (worked on the TV series Pip & Zip), (d. 1995).
- Jules Luyckx A.K.A. Julex, Belgian animator and comics artist (worked in the AFIM studios, with Ray Goossens), (d. 1962).

== Deaths ==
=== October ===
- October 2: Henry Underhill, English artist, photographer, and amateur scientist, (co-founder and president of the Oxfordshire Natural History Society, gave lectures on a variety of scientific topics. All of his lectures were illustrated by his hand-painted and photographic magic lantern slides. He also illustrated folk tales from England, Russia, Japan and Ireland. The Folklore Society holds a collection of over 300 of Underhill's folk tale magic lantern slides), dies at age 65.
