= Dudley Do-Right Emporium =

American gift shop

The Dudley Do-Right Emporium was a small, eccentric gift shop named after the fictional Canadian Mountie Dudley Do-Right, located on the Sunset Strip in West Hollywood, California.

== History ==
The emporium was founded and run by Jay Ward, creator of The Rocky and Bullwinkle Show (1959–63). The gift shop was located at 8200 Sunset Boulevard, a few yards from the former Jay Ward Productions (8218 Sunset Blvd.), the tiny studio building where the cartoons were produced, and across the street from the Chateau Marmont. The Dudley Do-Right Emporium opened in 1971 and closed its doors in April 2005.

The shop was filled with toys, stuffed animals, trinkets, hats, t-shirts, wristwatches, original animation cels, cartoon scripts, recordings of TV themes, and assorted souvenirs, all bearing the likenesses of Dudley Do-Right, Rocky & Bullwinkle, Peabody and Sherman, Hoppity Hooper, George of the Jungle, Tom Slick, Super Chicken, Boris & Natasha, Snidely Whiplash and the other famous, wacky creations of Jay Ward Studios.

In front of Jay Ward Productions was a 15-foot (4.6 m) statue of Bullwinkle J. Moose holding Rocky the Flying Squirrel. The statue was unveiled to the public at a kick-off party to commemorate "The Bullwinkle Show" joining NBC on September 20, 1961. Following Jay Ward's departure, the statue gradually fell into a state of disrepair and, in July 2013, was taken to DreamWorks Animation to be restored. When the restoration was completed, it was briefly displayed at the Paley Center in Beverly Hills. In January 2015, it was put on display at the West Hollywood City Hall. In August 2019 the West Hollywood city council decided to permanently place the statue on a traffic island at Sunset and Holloway.

The rotating statue of Bullwinkle holding Rocky was made to mimic the rotating statue of a Las Vegas showgirl on top of a giant billboard for the Sahara Hotel across Sunset Boulevard at the eastern end of the Sunset Strip. A picture of this showgirl statue can also be found as the cover of Gore Vidal's Myra Breckinridge.
