= George of the Jungle (2007 TV series) =

2007 Canadian-American animated television series

- Opening title of the show
- Genre: Comedy
- Based on: George of the Jungle by Jay Ward
- Directed by: J. Falconer (season 1); Paul Hunt (season 2)
- Voices of: (See Seasons 1/2 voice cast)
- Narrated by: Michael Daingerfield (season 1); Jeff Lumby (season 2)
- Theme music composer: Sheldon Allman & Stan Worth (original); Urban Legend (season 1); Voodoo Highway Music and Post (season 2)
- Opening theme: "George of the Jungle"
- Ending theme: "George of the Jungle" (Instrumental)
- Composers: Michael Richard Plowman (season 1); Graeme Cornies (season 2) David Kelly (season 2) James Chapple (season 2) Brian Pickett (season 2)
- Countries of origin: Canada; United States (season 1); Singapore (season 2)
- Original language: English
- No. of seasons: 2
- No. of episodes: 52 (104 segments) (list of episodes)

Production
- Executive producers: Tiffany Ward; Chris Bartleman, Evan Baily, Eric Ellenbogen, Blair Peters, Rob Simmons (season 1); Heather Walker, Jyotirmoy Saha, Pete Denomme, Richard Elliott, Simon Racioppa (season 2)
- Producers: Kevin Gamble (season 1); Mike Weiss (season 1); Firdaus Kharas (season 2)
- Running time: 22 minutes (11 minutes per segment)
- Production companies: Bullwinkle Studios; Classic Media (season 1); Studio B Productions (season 1); Switch Animation (season 2); August Media (season 2); August Rights (season 2)

Original release
- Network: Teletoon (Canada); Cartoon Network (U.S., season 1)
- Release: June 29, 2007 – January 11, 2008
- Release: September 10, 2016 – February 18, 2017

Related
- George of the Jungle

George of the Jungle is an animated television series. It is a reboot of Jay Ward and Bill Scott's 1967 American animated television series of the same name, which in turn is a parody of the fictional character Tarzan, created by Edgar Rice Burroughs. Using Flash animation, it is produced in Canada, airing there on Teletoon. The remake mostly stays true to the original production, with a few key differences existing between the two. Episodes of the show typically consist of two 11-minute segments. This is unlike the original cartoon, which featured other stories such as Tom Slick and Super Chicken.

The original series aired from June 29, 2007, until January 11, 2008 on Teletoon; Cartoon Network in the United States began airing it on January 11, 2008. In Latin America, the series arrived to Disney Channel on March 3, 2008; reruns moved to the local Jetix feed in October.

The series returned 9 years after the original first season with a second season on September 10, 2016. The revival season concluded on February 18, 2017.

== Characters ==
=== Main ===
- George – A friendly, yet dim-witted, strong man in a loincloth, he lives in a jungle in Africa. Possessing incredible strength, bravery, and a penchant for repeatedly crashing into trees while vine-swinging, George acts as the protector of all the inhabitants. He also acts immature and refers to himself in the illeism. In season 2, he looks more like his original 1967 design, and has a deeper voice.
- Ape – A sarcastic and intelligent gorilla that lives with George in the jungle. He functions as George's surrogate brother, parental figure and best friend, although his attempts to educate George have a long history of repeated failures. He also tends to serve as the voice of reason most of the time. In "George's Birthday Present", it is revealed Ape is 5 years old in ape years. Every time he hears the sound of Mitch's bongos, he dances uncontrollably, which results in mass insanity and the destruction of their tree house. He also dances on his fingers when George uses a leaf as a kazoo as revealed in "Ape Goes Ape". In season 2, his character remains mostly the same, the only notable difference being that he has a British accent as he does in the original series.
- Ursula (season 1)/Magnolia (season 2) – An urban girl who came to live in the jungle with George and his friends along with her father Dr. Scott. She quickly forms a bond with Magnolia, the latter having saved her from drowning with mouth to mouth resuscitation and Ursula returning the favor with CPR and a defibrillator, causing the two to be frequently seen together. Young, reckless and eager to introduce modern culture into the jungle, she often tries to educate her new friends to the marvels of modern city life (such as Christmas or traffic systems), only to usually have her attempts backfire. Regardless, she does her best to assist her friends when necessary. She is still adjusting to jungle life, and so she still has much to learn. In season 2, she studies and ventures the jungle without her father. She dreams of winning the Nobel Prize when her research is complete.
- Magnolia (season 1)/Ursula (season 2)– A native of the jungle and valley girl figure, she is one of George's closest friends since she came to the jungle. Despite her dressing in jungle attire (such as loincloths and sticks) as well as fits of hyperactivity, she originally appeared to be very well educated in both human and jungle knowledge, often helping to bridge the gap between Ursula's city life and jungle life. She speaks with a Southern accent, and can appear somewhat dimwitted at times. She is the daughter of the Witch Doctor, and therefore a Witch Doctor in training (according to the episode, "Frankengeorge"). In season 2, she behaves and speaks like a primitive cavewoman, wreaking mayhem throughout the jungle for her own amusement.

=== Supporting ===
- Narrator – The narrator of each George of the Jungle episode. In comparison to the narrator of the original cartoon, he speaks in a documentary-style fashion, often beginning each episode claiming "To survive in the jungle…", often followed by a situation in complete contrast to the first impression of his introduction. In season 2, he chimes in much more frequently, and also breaks the fourth wall by being able to speak directly to other characters (who refer to him as "Sky Voice").
- Dr. Scott – The modern doctor now living in the jungle with his daughter. He has formed a somewhat friendly (and often hostile) rivalry with the local Witch Doctor, continuously trying to disprove his barbaric medicine and shaman skills with modern science (often with equally unsuccessful results). In season 2, his name is Dr. Chicago, and he is now an evil dentist and no longer Magnolia's father. His schemes mostly involve conquest of the jungle, but said plots are always foiled by George.
- Witch Doctor – A very compact, diminutive character who believes his shaman skills are the solution to all problems. He often competes with Dr. Scott and his modern medicine to see who can solve a problem first, although neither usually provides the solution to whatever problem they tackle. Unlike most others, his character remains almost completely intact in the transition to season 2, with the only notable differences being that his voice is much deeper and he is no longer Ursula's father.
- Shep – George's pet elephant who acts like a dog. He is very untrained, and can often be seen destroying sections of the jungle.
- Tookie-Tookie Bird – George's second pet, a parrot-like bird that can only say his own name.
- Big Mitch – A conniving golden marmoset and frequent pest to the jungle community. He lives in an ancient temple full of riches and booby traps, and has a pair of bongos with him.
- Howie – A howler monkey who runs a juice bar.

=== Others ===
- Carl – Carl is a baboon who constantly makes a fool out of George and Ape.
- Cousin Larry – George's arrogant human cousin, who does his best to win at everything, no matter the cost. He was eventually revealed to be a cheater in all his victories and was ousted from the jungle.
- Cousin Papaya – George and Ape's cousin, a King Kong-like gorilla that made a promise to beat the living daylights out of anyone who would mess with George or Ape and the other gorillas.
- Edward Madmun – The creator of Madmun Island. He has an associate (and later enemy) who helped him climb to the top of Mount Everest and swim Madmun across the English Channel. George, Ape and the others often accidentally say "Madman" for his name, but someone always reminds them "It's MadMUN!".
- Lion – A lion who was defeated by George in his childhood.
- Tiger – A hungry predator who likes to feast on small defenseless creatures and appears randomly in cameos (as seen in "Rainy Season" and "Eagle Tick").

== Voice cast ==
- Lee Tockar (season 1) and Cory Doran (season 2) as George
- Paul Dobson (season 1) and Rob Tinkler (season 2) as Ape
- Britt Irvin (season 1) and Linda Ballantyne (season 2) as Ursula/Magnolia
- Tabitha St. Germain (season 1) and Bridget Wareham (season 2) as Magnolia/Ursula
- Mark Oliver (season 1) and Terry McGurrin (season 2) as Dr. Towel Scott/Dr. Chicago
- Brian Drummond (season 1) and Martin Julien (season 2) as Witch Doctor
- Tabitha St. Germain (season 1) and Cory Doran (season 2) as Tookie-Tookie Bird
- Doron Bell as Big Mitch
- Bill Mondy as Mantler
- Peter Kelamis as Cousin Larry
- Trevor Devall as Jungle Joel
- Michael Daingerfield (season 1) and Jeff Lumby (season 2) as Narrator

== Episodes ==
Season	Episodes	Originally released		Season DVD release date (Region 1)
Season	Episodes	First released	Last released	Season DVD release date (Region 1)
1	26	June 29, 2007	January 11, 2008	July 23, 2009 (excluded 23 and 25-26)
2	26	September 10, 2016	February 18, 2017	—N/a

== Production ==
Production of the series started in 2004 with Teletoon being in the project before Cartoon Network went on board; Tiffany Ward re-aged George to be a teenager while the art style is reminiscent of Cartoon Network series such as The Powerpuff Girls and Samurai Jack. Flash was used for the animation; Studio B was one of the first companies to adopt it. Another key difference between the 1967 and 2007 series is the prominence given to relationships with the core characters. All of the scripts were freelanced.

== Home media ==
Title	Season(s)	Episode count	Release date	Episodes
George of the Jungle: The Swingin' First Season	1	23	July 23, 2009 (Region 1)	1 ("Beetle Invasion" / "The Naked Ape Man") – 22 ("A Boy and His Elephant" / "George's Security Stone"), 24 ("Second Banana" / "One with Nature") (excluding "Jungle Bells", "The Goat of Christmas Presents", and "Escape from Madmun Island")
