= GotJ =

GOTJ is an acronym that may refer to:

In entertainment:

- George of the Jungle, 1967 animated television series
- George of the Jungle (2007 TV series), 2007 remake of the 1967 series
- George of the Jungle (film), 1997 live-action film

Other uses:

- The Gathering of the Juggalos, music festival
