= Jay Ward Productions =

American animation studio

Jay Ward Productions, Inc.
- Jay Ward's Bullwinkle logo used since 2015
- Industry: Animation
- Founded: 1958; 68 years ago
- Founder: Jay Ward
- Headquarters: Costa Mesa, California, U.S.
- Key people: Tiffany Ward (president); Amber Ward (vice president)
- Subsidiaries: Bullwinkle Studios (50%)

Jay Ward Productions, Inc. (sometimes shortened to Ward Productions) is an American animation studio based in Costa Mesa, California. It was founded in 1958 by American animator Jay Ward. As of 2022, the studio is headed by Ward's daughter, Tiffany Ward, and granddaughter, vice president Amber Ward.

Before 2022, when the studio signed a distribution deal with WildBrain, the Jay Ward catalogue was managed by Bullwinkle Studios, a joint venture between Jay Ward Productions and the DreamWorks Animation subsidiary of NBCUniversal.

== History ==
The company was based on the Sunset Strip in West Hollywood, across Sunset Boulevard from the Chateau Marmont.

By 2002, Jay Ward Productions had formed Bullwinkle Studios LLC, a joint venture with Classic Media (then an Entertainment Rights subsidiary), to manage the Jay Ward characters. Bullwinkle Studios's first production was George of the Jungle with Studio B Productions, a unit of DHX Media. The series was broadcast on Teletoon, then added to Cartoon Network. Jay Ward's daughter, Tiffany Ward, is the president of Ward Productions and Bullwinkle Studios. Classic Media was acquired in 2012 by DreamWorks Animation, which was later purchased by the Comcast-owned NBCUniversal in 2016.

On February 3, 2022, Jay Ward Productions signed a deal with WildBrain to produce new content based on its portfolio. The agreement also includes distribution rights to the entire Jay Ward Productions library. However, DreamWorks retains the distribution rights to its co-productions.

== Television programs ==
=== Animation ===
==== Jay Ward Productions (pre-Classic Media) ====
- Rocky and His Friends/The Bullwinkle Show (1959–1964)
  - Fractured Fairy Tales
  - Aesop and Son
  - Bullwinkle's Corner
  - Mr. Know-It-All
  - The Rocky and Bullwinkle Fan Club
  - Peabody's Improbable History
  - Dudley Do-Right of the Mounties
- Hoppity Hooper (1964–1967)
  - Uncle Waldo's Cartoon Show
- The Dudley Do Right Show (1964–1966)
- George of the Jungle (1967)
  - Super Chicken
  - Tom Slick

==== Bullwinkle Studios ====
- George of the Jungle (2007–2008, 2016–2017)
- The Mr. Peabody & Sherman Show (2015–2017)
- The Adventures of Rocky and Bullwinkle (2018–2019)

==== Jay Ward Productions (post-2022) ====
- George of the Jungle (reruns only)
- The Mr. Peabody & Sherman Show (reruns only)
- The Adventures of Rocky and Bullwinkle (reruns only)

=== Live-action ===
- Fractured Flickers (1962–1964)

=== Unsold pilots ===
- The Nut House (1964)
- Rah Rah Woozy (1980)

== Films ==
=== Animation ===
==== Jay Ward Productions (pre-Classic Media) ====
- Snidley's Monster (1961) (short film)
- Sleeping Beauty (1961) (short film)
- The Phox, The Box, and The Lox (1999) (short film)

==== Bullwinkle Studios ====
- Mr. Peabody & Sherman (2014)
- Rocky and Bullwinkle (2014) (direct-to-video short film)

=== Live-action ===
- Boris and Natasha (1992) (TV film)
- George of the Jungle (1997)
- Dudley Do-Right (1999)
- The Adventures of Rocky and Bullwinkle (2000) (live-action/animated)
- George of the Jungle 2 (2003) (direct-to-video)

== Commercials ==
=== General Mills ===
- Cheerios, using characters Rocky and Bullwinkle (1959–1970), Boris Badenov (1959–1970), Aesop and Son (1960–1970), Dudley Do-Right (1961–1970), and Hoppity Hooper (1961–1972)
- Trix, using characters Rocky and Bullwinkle (1959–1970) along with Hoppity Hooper (1961–1972)
- Cocoa Puffs, using characters Rocky and Bullwinkle (1959–1970) along with Hoppity Hooper (1961–1972)
- Jets, using characters Rocky and Bullwinkle (1959–1970) along with Hoppity Hooper (1961–1972)
- Wheat Hearts, using characters Mr. Peabody and Sherman (1959–1970)
- Frosty O's, using characters Dudley Do-Right (1961–1970) and Hoppity Hooper (1961–1972)
- Lucky Charms, using characters Boris and Natasha (1964–1970) along with Hoppity Hooper (1964–1972)

=== Quaker Oats Company ===
- Cap'n Crunch (1963–1984)
- Quisp and Quake (1965–1973)
- Monster Munch (1966)
- Aunt Jemima (1968–1973)
- King Vitaman (1968)
- Frosted Oat Flakes (1968–1969)
- Fudge Town Cookies (1968)
- Mr. Chips Cookies (1968–1969)
- Scooter Pie Cookies (1968)
- Cinnamon Bear Cereal (1969)
- Cinnamon Flakes (1969)
- Crackles (1969)
- Gauchos Cookies (1969)
- Mister E (1969)
- Pronto (1969)
- Scooter Pies (1969)
- Vitaman the Great (1969)
- King Vitaman (1970–1971)
- Halfsies (1979–1982)
- Hi-Lo's (1980)
