= Quisp =

Cereal brand, and name of its mascot

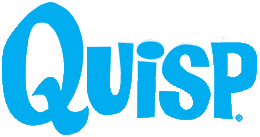

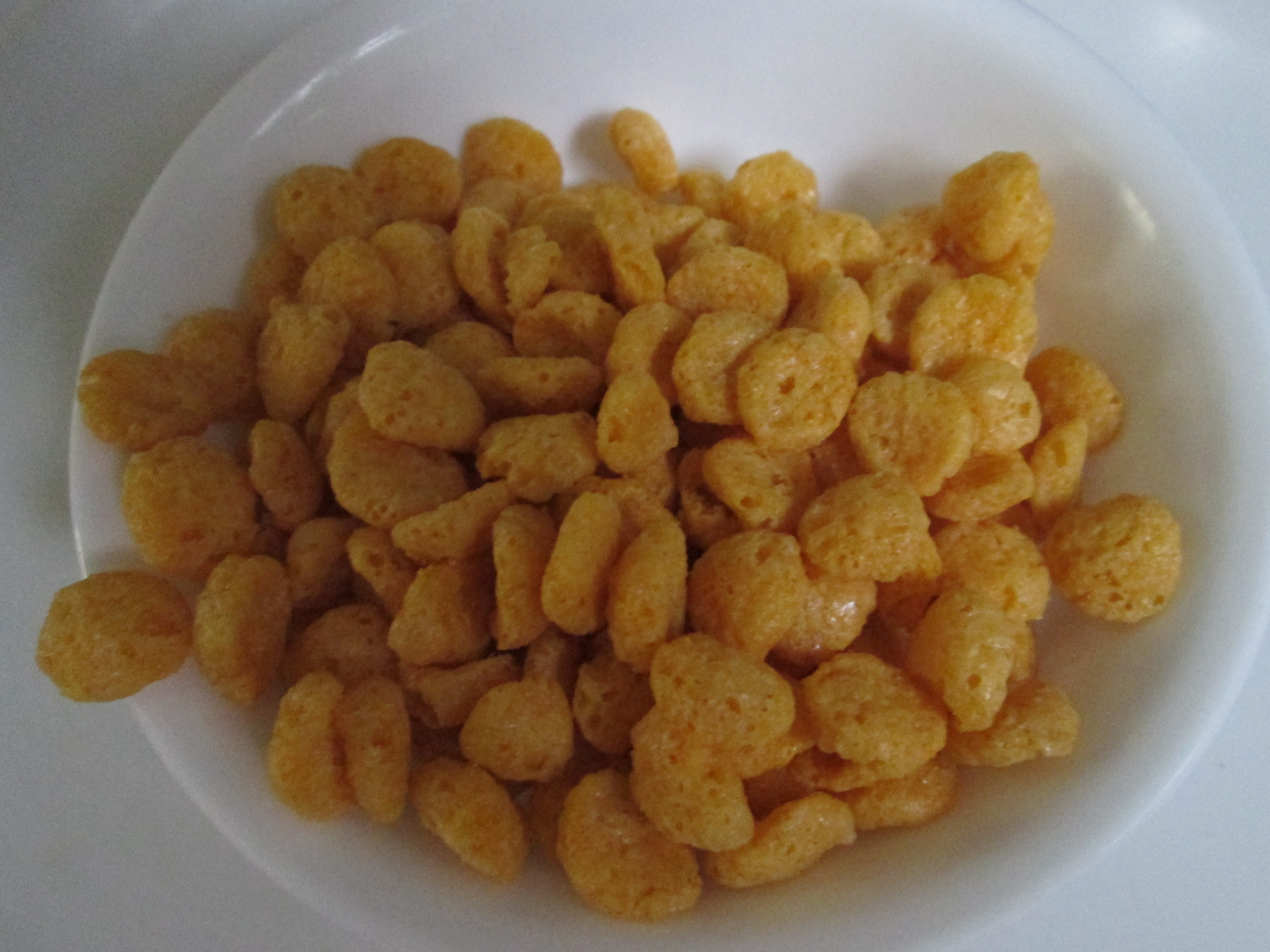
- Product type: Breakfast cereal
- Current owner: Quaker Oats
- Country: U.S.
- Introduced: 1965; 61 years ago

Quisp is a sugar-sweetened breakfast cereal from the Quaker Oats Company. It was introduced in 1965 and continued as a mass-market grocery item until the late 1970s. Subsequently, the Quaker Oats Company marketed Quisp sporadically, and with the advent of the Internet, began selling it primarily online. Quisp made its return to supermarkets as a mass-market grocery item in late 2012.

Quaker Oats initially marketed Quisp with a companion cereal brand, Quake. Television commercials featuring both brands were produced by Jay Ward, the producer of The Rocky and Bullwinkle Show.

== History ==
Quisp (left) and Quake characters with boxes of their respective cereals in a TV commercial

Quisp and Quake were originally released in 1965 in the United States by the Quaker Oats Company and generally advertised together (during the same commercial) with their character mascots competing against each other. The ads were cartoons created by Jay Ward, who also created the cartoon characters Rocky and Bullwinkle, Dudley Do-Right, Hoppity Hooper and many others, and the Quisp ads used some of the same voice actors as the Rocky and Bullwinkle series, including Daws Butler as the voice of Quisp and William Conrad as the voice of Quake.

In an interview, Ward's creative partner Bill Scott described Ward's involvement in cereal advertising: "When the cereal company approached Jay about doing this stuff — I think it was in 1961 — he said, 'We'll only do it as long as it's fun.'"

Quisp was depicted as a diminutive alien with antennae that functioned as a propeller enabling him to fly. The Crown Prince of Planet Q, he was dressed in a green boilersuit with a "Q" belt buckle on his black belt, and, like moon men Gidney and Cloyd of Ward's Rocky and Bullwinkle, was armed with a scrooch gun. In contrast, the more "earthy" Quake was portrayed as a tall, musclebound red-headed miner wearing blue pants, black work-boots, a red t-shirt emblazoned with a blue "Q", a yellow miner's helmet with a headlamp, a wristband on his right arm, and a purple cape.

The commercials often asked children to choose which cereal was better, and to compete over taste or premiums. The competition reached its peak in 1972, when a series of commercials asked kids to vote for which cereal should remain on the shelves. In 1969, Quake was given a makeover, slimming down and swapping his lighted miner's hard hat for an Australian bush hat and cape. Quisp was the winner and Quake cereal was discontinued, but Quake himself introduced a new sidekick, an orange kangaroo named Simon and a new orange-flavored cereal called Quake's Orange Quangaroos. In 1976, Quaker Oats ran another contest, this time asking children to choose between Quisp and Quangaroos. Quisp won again and Quangaroos was discontinued.

Around 1979-80, the Quaker Oats Company discontinued Quisp due to low sales. It was reintroduced in 1985, then again in the 1990s and in 2001, where it was relaunched as the "first Internet cereal". Consumers were encouraged to visit the Quisp Web site to view animated endings to cartoons on the back of the cereal box. The online Flash animation was produced by John Kricfalusi and Spümcø, featuring Quisp and his sidekick Quunchy (voiced by Corey Burton and Matt Danner, respectively).

Quisp remained in limited distribution for some time, with Quaker Oats distributing the product in "guerrilla displays" that would appear in a store and last until the product sold out. Even in the late 2010s, it could occasionally be found in grocery and discount chains such as Dollar General, Grocery Outlet, Marc's, SuperTarget, and Food Lion. Quaker Oats also sold Quisp directly to the public through an online store.

== Description ==
Quisp is a baked paste of corn meal and syrup shaped like "flying saucers". The taste is similar to that of Cap'n Crunch, also made by Quaker Oats. Quake cereal was produced by the same process and ingredients, but shaped like gears. Packaging as of 2012 carries the tagline on the front panel, "Crunchy Corn Cereal", and on side panels, "QUAZY Energy Cereal".

== Ingredients ==
Main ingredients: Corn flour, sugar, oat flour, brown sugar, coconut oil, salt. Vitamins and other additives: niacinamide, reduced iron, zinc oxide, yellow 5, yellow 6, thiamin mononitrate, pyridoxine hydrochloride, BHT, riboflavin, folic acid.

Quaker Oats also used to offer a saucer-shaped cereal with identical ingredients in its Bagged Cereals line under the name Quaker Sweet Crunch.
