= George of the Jungle 2 =

2003 American comedy film

- Home video release poster
- Directed by: David Grossman
- Screenplay by: Jordan Moffet
- Based on: George of the Jungle by Jay Ward; Bill Scott
- Produced by: Gregg Hoffman; Jordan Kerner
- Starring: Thomas Haden Church; Julie Benz; Christina Pickles; Angus T. Jones; Kelly Miller; Michael Clarke Duncan; John Cleese; Christopher Showerman
- Cinematography: David Burr
- Edited by: Alan Cody
- Music by: J. A. C. Redford
- Production companies: Walt Disney Pictures; The Kerner Entertainment Company
- Distributed by: Buena Vista Home Entertainment
- Release date: October 21, 2003
- Running time: 87 minutes
- Countries: United States; Australia
- Language: English

George of the Jungle 2 is a 2003 comedy film and the sequel to the 1997 Disney film George of the Jungle. It was directed by David Grossman and written by Jordan Moffet. The film stars Thomas Haden Church, Julie Benz, Christina Pickles, Angus T. Jones, Michael Clarke Duncan, John Cleese, and introducing Christopher Showerman in his film debut as George, replacing Brendan Fraser. Cleese and Church reprise their roles from the first film. The film focuses on George trying to save Ape Mountain from his evil nemesis Lyle.

It was filmed in Tallebudgera on the Gold Coast of Queensland, Australia.

George of the Jungle 2 was released by Buena Vista Home Entertainment on October 21, 2003.

== Plot ==
Six years after socialite Ursula Stanhope left civilization to marry George of the Jungle, George has fathered George Jr. and finds himself hard-pressed to fulfill the roles of jungle king, father, and husband.

George's stress level increases when "Mean Lion" challenges him for leadership of the jungle, and when Ursula's mother Beatrice teams up with Ursula's ex-fiancé, Lyle van de Groot, in a plot to bring Ursula and George Jr. back to civilization. Beatrice invites Ursula, George, and George Jr. to visit Las Vegas, which they accept. Throughout the visit, Beatrice and Ursula's fellow socialites try to convince Ursula that George is unworthy of her affection. George, observing the threats but not his wife's resistance, begins to think himself unworthy of Ursula.

George's mentor Ape has accumulated gambling debts to several creditors, including Lyle. Upon discovering that Ape does not own Ape Mountain, but George does, Lyle makes Ape work off his debts for the next 17 years. He then engages Ape as a staged song performer and steals the deed to Ape Mountain from George's wardrobe. He sends two agents, Sally and Kowalski, to Ape Mountain, where they begin to demolish the jungle. The animals, terrified, turn to the Lion for guardianship.

Having failed to convince Ursula to leave George, Beatrice hires Armando, a master of hypnosis to hypnotize Ursula into having no memory of George and believing Lyle is her husband. George, upon hearing from Beatrice that Ursula has left him, leaves his luck-charm with Ursula as she sleeps, then departs. Tookie informs George about the jungle demolition and Mean Lion's revolt, so George convinces Ape to leave Las Vegas with him, eluding capture and chases by Sally and Kowalski alongside security guards, police officers, and animal control officers.

In San Francisco, Lyle fails to persuade Ursula that he is worthy of her affection. George arrives, determined to win Ursula and George Jr. back before saving the jungle. Ursula insists she must be loyal to her marriage vows to Lyle. After accidentally knocking her unconscious, George returns home with her, Ape, George Jr., and Rocky the kangaroo. George overthrows Mean Lion and convinces the other African animals to join him in stopping the diggers. George defeats the bulldozers with the help of George Jr., Ape, Shep, Rocky, and Tookie.

Lyle's agents Sally and Kowalski come to destroy the tree house only to be defeated by George and Rocky. George Jr. shuts off the digging machine. Lyle and Beatrice arrive to pick up Ursula and George Jr. George defeats Lyle and hangs him in a tree. George kisses Ursula, restoring her full memory of him, and Beatrice is kissed by a gorilla. A defeated Lyle takes his anger out on the Narrator by insulting him. In response, the Narrator grabs him and removes him from the story. After George kisses Ursula's friends (for they had been hypnotized into forgetting George also), George and Ursula renew their wedding vows and learn to find balance among George's duties.

== Cast ==
- Christopher Showerman as George, King of the Jungle. Showerman replaces Brendan Fraser, with characters referencing this throughout the film.
- Thomas Haden Church as Lyle Van de Groot, George's nemesis and Ursula's ex-fiance.
- Julie Benz as Ursula Stanhope, Queen of the Jungle. Benz replaces Leslie Mann.
- Christina Pickles as Beatrice Stanhope, Ursula's mother, George's mother-in-law, and George Jr's maternal grandmother. Pickles replaces Holland Taylor.
- Angus T. Jones as George Jr., Prince of the Jungle.
- Kelly Miller as Betsy, Ursula's friend
- John Kassir as Armando, the famous hypnotist and master of the hypnosis
- Abdoulaye N'Gom, Lamont Thompson, and Lydell M. Cheshier as Kip, N'Dugo, and Baleto, three porters from the previous film who take Beatrice to George's treehouse. Only N'Gom and Cheshier reprise their roles while N'Dugo was previously portrayed by Michael Chinyamurindi in the previous film.
- Marjean Holden as Sally, one of Lyle's henchwomen
- Erika Heynatz as Kowalski, another one of Lyle's henchwomen
- Dean Vegas as an Elvis impersonator
- Paul Wayne as a Kenny Rogers impersonator
- Peta Sergeant as an attractive woman
- Scooper as Tookie

=== Voices ===
- John Cleese as Ape, an Eastern gorilla and George's friend/foster brother who is operating in Las Vegas
- Michael Clarke Duncan as Mean Lion, a lion who challenges George for reign over the jungle
- John Kassir as Rocky, a red kangaroo
- Kevin Greutert as Tookie, a toco toucan
- Kevin Michael Richardson as
  - Grouchy Gorilla
  - Chimpanzee
- Tress MacNeille as Tiger
- Dee Bradley Baker as
  - Dexter the Monkey
  - A Water Buffalo that once taught George how to swim.
- Keith Scott as Narrator

== Release ==
Disney released George of the Jungle 2 direct-to-video on October 21, 2003. The film was originally scheduled to be released in summer 2003, but it was delayed to October 21, 2003. A week prior to release, Caterpillar Inc. sued Disney over concerns that the film's use of its trademark (appearing on the bulldozers) constituted damage to its reputation. Caterpillar Inc. asked for a restraining order to prevent the release, but they were unsuccessful.

== Reception ==
George of the Jungle 2 received generally negative reviews. On Rotten Tomatoes, the film has an approval rating of 17% based on reviews from 6 critics.

Joe Leydon of Variety wrote "One of the finest and funniest made-for-video sequels ever released on the Disney label offers an unusually satisfying mix of kid-friendly broad comedy and knowing pop culture parody." Michael Rankins of DVD Verdict wrote that the film "delivers cheap, fluffy, mostly painfree chuckles" and suggested that people watch Jay Ward's cartoons instead. Aaron Beierle of DVD Talk rated the film 2 out of 5 and wrote, "Although not quite the dreadful affair that most will be expecting from this kind of a direct-to-video effort, there's simply not much story for the film to go on and the only witty moments are provided by the narrator".
