= The Great Cheese Robbery (disambiguation) =

The Great Cheese Robbery is a 1920 silent short animated film made by Bray Productions featuring Krazy Kat.

The Great Cheese Robbery may also refer to:

- The Great Cheese Robbery (1986 film), Velká sýrová loupež, a 1966 Czech animated film by Václav Bedřich
- The Great Cheese Robbery, 2015 children's book by Chris Mould
- The Great Cheese Robbery, 2016 children's book written by Tim Warnes
