= Crusader Rabbit =

American animated television series

- Title card
- Created by: Alexander Anderson; Jay Ward
- Starring: First series: Lucille Bliss; Second series: Ge Ge Pearson; Russ Coughlan; Both series: Vern Louden; Roy Whaley
- Opening theme: "Rabbit Fanfare" (adapted from "The Trail to Mexico") and "Main Title Rabbit" (adapted from "Ten Little Indians") "Juggins" by Van Phillips (hour-long version of the 1957 series)
- Country of origin: United States
- Original language: English
- No. of seasons: 3
- No. of episodes: 455; 195 (black and white); 260 (color)

Production
- Executive producers: Jerry Fairbanks (1950–52); Shull Bonsall (1956–59)
- Running time: 4 minutes
- Production companies: Television Arts Productions (1950–52); Jerry Fairbanks, Inc. (1950–52); Capital Enterprises/TV Spots (1956–59)

Original release
- Network: Syndication (1950–1979); WNBC (1950–1967) and KNBH (1950) (NBC's owned-and-operated station in New York and Los Angeles) (1950–1967)
- Release: August 1, 1950 – December 1, 1959

Crusader Rabbit is an American animated cartoon series created by Alexander Anderson and Jay Ward, and the first of its kind to be produced specifically for television. Its main characters were Crusader Rabbit and his sidekick Ragland T. Tiger, or "Rags". The stories were four-minute-long satirical cliffhangers.

The concept was test marketed in 1948, while the initial serial – Crusader vs. the State of Texas – aired on KNBH in Los Angeles beginning on August 1, 1950 (not August 1, 1949 as some sources erroneously state). The program was syndicated from 1950 to 1951 for 195 episodes, then was revived in 1956 for 260 color episodes. Ward, who later went on to create The Adventures of Rocky and Bullwinkle and Friends, was involved as business manager and producer.

== Production history ==
The concept of a cartoon series made exclusively for television came from animator Alex Anderson, who worked for Terrytoons Studios founded by Anderson's uncle Paul Terry. Terrytoons turned down Anderson's proposed series, preferring to remain in theatrical film animation. Consequently, Anderson approached Jay Ward to create a partnership – Anderson being in charge of production and Ward arranging financing. Ward became business manager and producer, joining with Anderson to form "Television Arts Productions" in 1947.

They tried to sell the series, initially presented as part of a proposed series, The Comic Strips of Television, which featured an earlier incarnation of Dudley Do-Right of the Mounties – to the NBC TV network, with Jerry Fairbanks as the network's "supervising producer". NBC didn't broadcast Crusader Rabbit, but allowed Fairbanks to sell the series in national syndication with many NBC affiliates, including those in New York and Los Angeles, picking it up for local showings. WNBC-TV in New York continued to show the original Crusader Rabbit episodes from 1950 - 1967, and some stations used the program as late as the 1970s.

The original series employed limited animation, appearing almost as narrated storyboards with frequent cuts and minor movement by the characters, much in the style of another early NBC animated program, Tele-Comics. This was due to the limited budget that producers Jay Ward and Alex Anderson worked with to film the series.

In 1948, Clarence E. Wheeler created the original opening and closing theme for the animated series, adapting and composing the folk melodies "The Trail to Mexico" (known on cue sheets as "Rabbit Fanfare") and "Ten Little Indians" (known as "Main Title Rabbit"). Each program began with a title sequence of a mounted knight galloping across the screen. The episodes then featured a short, usually satirical, adventure in the form of a movie serial, ending with a cliffhanger.

Crusader Rabbit was syndicated from 1950 to 1952, totaling 195 episodes (divided into 10 "crusades"), and then re-aired for many years. It featured Crusader Rabbit, his companion Ragland T. Tiger ("Rags"), and their occasional nemeses – Dudley Nightshade (whose name was a play on the poisonous plant "deadly nightshade") and Whetstone Whiplash with his sidekick, Bilious Green. Some episodes featured Crusader's and Rags' friend Garfield the Groundhog. Ragland Tiger's name was a pun on the jazz tune "Tiger Rag"; his middle initial "T" stood for The (as in Rags The Tiger). As a running gag, another character would ask Rags what the "T" stood for, to which he would reply, "Larry. My father couldn't spell!"

The series was revived and 13 new "crusades" (totaling 260 color episodes) were produced in 1956 by Shull Bonsall's Capital Enterprises. Bonsall purchased Television Arts Productions and gained the rights to Crusader Rabbit during a protracted legal battle between Jay Ward, Alex Anderson, Jerry Fairbanks and the NBC network over ownership of the series. Animation was provided by Bonsall's Creston Studios, also known as TV Spots, Inc., supervised by Bob Ganon and Gerald Ray. The new series was not seen until early 1959.

The revived (2nd) series used an opening and closing theme from the British "Impress" production music library licensed by Emil Ascher publishing of New York. It was titled "Juggins", and was composed by Van Phillips, the professional name of Alexander Van Cleve Phillips.

Lucille Bliss provided the voice of Crusader Rabbit in the original series; she was replaced by Ge Ge Pearson in the revived series. Vern Louden played Rags in both. Dudley Nightshade was voiced by Russ Coughlan, and narration was by Roy Whaley.

== Broadcast history ==
Japan

In Japan, it was first broadcast on Fuji TV, which had just opened, from July 20 , 1959 to October 4, 1960 (reruns were broadcast from May 18, 1960 onwards). It was sponsored solely by Meiji Dairy (now Meiji Co. Ltd). It was one of the first cartoons to air on Fuji Television. The narration was provided by Ryo Kurosawa and Michie Kita. The show was later rebroadcast on Tokyo Channel 12 (now TV Tokyo).

== Legacy ==
The success of Crusader Rabbit inspired many more television cartoon character packages. Jay Ward would later produce The Rocky and Bullwinkle Show.

== Home video ==
In 1985, Rhino Entertainment released the first two volumes of Crusader Rabbit in a planned home video release of all the original episodes. However, 20th Century Fox claimed the distribution rights by their acquisition of previous owner Metromedia Producers Corporation. The Walt Disney Company through 20th Television currently owns the distribution rights of the show.

In 2009, AudioTape, Inc. released a three-DVD set of 11 Crusader Rabbit serials; two from the black-and-white era (including "Crusader Rabbit vs. the State of Texas") and nine from the color era.

== In popular culture ==
- There were two Dell Publishing comic books featuring Crusader Rabbit and Rags.
- In 2009, Lulu.com published Where Is Crusader Rabbit Now That We Really Need Him?, a biographical novel about soldiers in the Vietnam War by William K. Millar Jr.
- A Leave it to Beaver episode mentions a Crusader Rabbit sweatshirt in the lost and found.
- In interviews, James Garner frequently (with tongue in cheek) compared his television characters of Bret Maverick, Nichols, and Jim Rockford to Crusader Rabbit, for their tendencies to get involved in somewhat ridiculous situations, while surrounded by companions who were often flaky, unreliable, or comically inept.

== First series ==
The first series aired in syndication, with production of 195 episodes ending in 1951.

=== Episodes ===
- Crusader vs. the State of Texas (15 chapters)
- Crusader vs. the Pirates (20 chapters)
- Crusader and the Rajah of Rinsewater (20 chapters)
- Crusader and the Schmohawk Indians (15 chapters)
- Crusader and the Great Horse Mystery (20 chapters)
- Crusader and the Circus (10 chapters)
- Crusader in the Tenth Century (30 chapters)
- Crusader and the Mad Hollywood Scientist (15 chapters)
- Crusader and the Leprechauns (25 chapters)
- Crusader and the Showboat (25 chapters)

=== Production staff ===
- Executive Producer: Jerry Fairbanks
- Producers: Jay Ward, Alex Anderson
- Director: Alex Anderson
- Story: Alex Anderson, Joe Curtin, Hal Goodman, Arthur North, Lloyd Turner
- Artists: Alex Anderson, Bob Bastian, Bob Bemiller, Chuck Fusion, Randy Grochoski, Ed King, Ted Martine, Bob Mills, Lee Mishkin, Grim Natwick, Russ Sholl, Jim Scott, John Sparey, Dean Spille, Spaulding White, Volney White
- Camera: Bob Oleson, Jack Williams
- Music: Clarence E. Wheeler
- Editor: Tom Stanford

=== Voices ===
- Lucille Bliss — Crusader Rabbit
- Vern Louden — Ragland T. ("Rags") Tiger
- Russ Coughlan – Dudley Nightshade
- Roy Whaley — Narrator
- Patti Pritchard and Tom Stanford — Additional voices

== Second series ==
The second series premiered in 1956 syndication with 260 episodes produced, 20 "chapters" per episode. They were later edited into 13 one-hour programs.

=== Episodes ===
- "The Great Uranium Hunt" (also known as "Mine Your Own Business")
- "The Yukon Adventure" (also known as "Thar's Gold in Them Fills")
- "Tales of Schmerwood Forest" (also known as "Crook's Tour")
- "West We Forget"
- "Sahara You"
- "Gullible's Travels"
- "Should Auld Acquaintance Be for Cotton" (also known as "Belly Acres Mystery")
- "Nothing Atoll"
- "Scars and Stripes"
- "Apes of Rath"
- "Caesar's Salad" (also known as "There's No Place Like Rome")
- "The Great Baseball Mystery" (also known as "Gone With the Wind-Up")
- "The Search for the Missing Link"

=== Production staff ===
- Executive Producer: Shull Bonsall
- Director: Sam Nicholson
- Animation Director: Bob Bemiller
- Story: Chris Bob Hayward, Barbara Chain
- Story Sketch: Jack Miller
- Music Scoring: Art Becker
- Sound Effects: Ray Erlenborn, Gene Twambley
- Layout: Ed Levitt
- Animators: Alex Ignatiev, Bob Matz, Reuben Timmens, Joseph Price, John Sparey, Marv Woodward
- Backgrounds: David Weidman, Eleanor Bogardus, Rosemary O'Connor
- Ink and Paint: Martha Buckley, Maggi Alcumbrac
- Production Planning: Dave Hoffman
- Camera: Julian E. Raymond, Ted Bemiller
- Editors: Charles McCann, Norman Vizents
- Production Supervision: Bob Ganon

=== Voices ===
- Ge Ge Pearson – Crusader Rabbit
- Vern Louden – Ragland T. ("Rags") Tiger
- Roy Whaley – Narrator
- Russ Coughlan – Dudley Nightshade

== See also ==
- List of animated television series
