= George of the Jungle (film) =

1997 American comedy film

- Theatrical release poster
- Directed by: Sam Weisman
- Screenplay by: Dana Olsen; Audrey Wells
- Story by: Dana Olsen
- Based on: George of the Jungle by: Jay Ward; Bill Scott
- Produced by: David Hoberman; Jordan Kerner; Jon Avnet
- Starring: Brendan Fraser; Leslie Mann; Thomas Haden Church; Holland Taylor; Richard Roundtree; John Cleese
- Cinematography: Thomas E. Ackerman
- Edited by: Stuart Pappé; Roger Bondelli
- Music by: Marc Shaiman
- Production company: Walt Disney Pictures
- Distributed by: Buena Vista Pictures Distribution
- Release date: July 16, 1997
- Running time: 92 minutes
- Country: United States
- Language: English
- Budget: $55 million
- Box office: $174.4 million

George of the Jungle is a 1997 American comedy film directed by Sam Weisman. It is based on the 1967 American animated television series of the same name created by Jay Ward and Bill Scott, which parodied the fictional character Tarzan by Edgar Rice Burroughs. The screenplay was written by Dana Olsen and Audrey Wells. The film stars Brendan Fraser as the title character, alongside Leslie Mann, Thomas Haden Church, Holland Taylor, Richard Roundtree, and John Cleese. The plot follows a man who was raised by animals in the jungle and later falls in love with a wealthy heiress, leading to conflict with her self-absorbed fiancé.

Produced by Walt Disney Pictures, the film was released theatrically in the United States and Canada by Buena Vista Pictures Distribution on July 16, 1997. It premiered on the Disney Channel in the United States on December 5, 1998. The film received mixed reviews from critics but was a commercial success grossing $174.4 million worldwide. A direct-to-video sequel, George of the Jungle 2, was released on October 21, 2003.

== Plot ==
On a flight to the Bukuvu, a baby named George becomes stranded after a plane crash and is raised by the jungle, becoming the "White Ape".

25 years later, while touring Burundi with local guide Kwame and a trio of porters, San Francisco heiress Ursula Stanhope encounters her spoiled fiancé Lyle van de Groot, who wishes to take her home and has hired two poachers, Max and Thor, to track her down. Ursula refuses to go home until she sees an ape, so Lyle enters the jungle to find them. The two encounter a lion, and when Lyle knocks himself unconscious while ostensibly fleeing to get help, Ursula is saved by George.

After taking Ursula to his tree house home and caring for her, George introduces her to his three animal friends: Ape, a talking gorilla who raised him; Shep, an elephant who acts like a dog; and Tookie, a toucan who delivers him news. George is smitten with Ursula and attempts to woo her; Ursula's time spent with George makes her grow fond of him, and she soon reciprocates his attraction.

Lyle, Max, and Thor soon arrive at the treehouse, but Ursula berates Lyle for trying to abandon her during the lion attack. Max and Thor try to shoot Shep for his ivory, and Ape shouts at Shep to run. Everyone is stunned by the sight of Ape, and Max and Thor decide to tranquilize and capture him. George runs to stop them, and is accidentally shot by Lyle. Lyle is imprisoned after being identified as the shooter by the porters. Max and Thor are deported, but resolve to return to the treehouse to capture Ape and make a fortune off of him. Meanwhile, Ursula takes George to San Francisco to get medical help for his gunshot wound and to show him the human world, which he has not seen since infancy.

While Ursula is at work, George explores San Francisco on his own and uses his vine-swinging skills to rescue a man whose paraglider has become caught on the suspension cables of the Bay Bridge. Ursula confesses to her parents about what happened in Africa and intends to break off the wedding, but her overbearing mother, Beatrice, objects. At a party intended to celebrate Ursula's engagement, Beatrice takes George aside. She tells him that Ursula's marriage to Lyle must proceed as planned and threatens to harm George if he interferes. In Burundi, Max and Thor tranquilize Ape; before he falls unconscious and is captured, Ape sends Tookie to find George. Tookie flies to San Francisco and informs George of Ape's capture, forcing George to leave Ursula and return to Burundi. While confused by George's unexplained departure, Ursula realizes she truly loves George and goes to find him.

George confronts and defeats Max and Thor with help from Ursula and the animals. Lyle then appears, revealed to have escaped from prison and become a legally ordained minister able to perform marriage ceremonies. Lyle has George subdued by a group of mercenaries and forcibly takes Ursula to a boat waiting on the Ape River to perform their marriage rites. However, the ceremony is interrupted by a series of harsh rapids that put them both in danger. George is rescued from the mercenaries with help from Shep and the gorillas, and swings in to reach Ursula and Lyle, but crashes painfully into a massive tree. As the tree falls over the river, George manages to pull Ursula to safety while the rapids lead Lyle into a dark cave. Lyle, thinking Ursula is still in the boat, proclaims their wedding vows, but inadvertently marries a gorilla, who begins kissing him.

George and Ursula declare their love for each other and marry, with the people of San Francisco, the Bukuvu, and the jungle's animals in attendance. Sometime later, the two live in their treehouse and raise a son, George Jr., whom they present to the animals. Ape moves to Las Vegas and becomes a singer, with a humiliated Max and Thor forced to be part of his performance.

== Cast ==
- Brendan Fraser as George, a young man who was raised in the jungle like Tarzan and frequently crashes into trees while swinging on vines. Fraser had concurrently auditioned for the title role in Disney's serious animated adaptation of Tarzan, which would be released in 1999, but lost to Tony Goldwyn.
- Leslie Mann as Ursula Stanhope, a wealthy but virtuous heiress and George's love interest
- Thomas Haden Church as Lyle van de Groot, Ursula's wealthy, self-absorbed, and bumbling former fiancé who serves as the main antagonist of the film
- Greg Cruttwell and Abraham Benrubi as Max and Thor, two poachers hired as trackers by Lyle
- Holland Taylor as Beatrice Stanhope, Ursula's domineering mother, who believes that social position is more important than having a loving marriage and serves as the secondary antagonist of the film
- John Bennett Perry as Arthur Stanhope, Ursula's supportive father who wishes her to marry for love rather than for social position
- Kelly Miller as Betsy, Ursula's best friend who has an instant attraction to George
- Willie Brown as Mayor Willie L. Brown Jr
- Richard Roundtree as Kwame, the head jungle tour guide during Ursula's visit to Africa
- Abdoulaye N'Gom, Michael Chinyamurindi, and Lydell M. Cheshier as Kip, N'Dugo, and Baleto, respectively. They are Kwame's porters and fellow tour guides.
- Lauren Bowles, Samantha Harris, and Afton Smith as Ursula's friends
- Spencer Garrett and Jon Pennell as Male Guests at Party
- Noah John Cardoza and Benjamin John Cardoza as George Jr.
- Mr. Binx, Zakery, Emely, and Crystal as Monkey
- Tai as Shep, an African forest elephant that acts like a dog
- Joseph, Kaleb, and Bongo as The Lion
- Tookie, Scooper, and Hopper as Tookie, a toucan

=== Voices ===
- John Cleese as Ape, a well-educated, talking eastern gorilla who is George's best friend and foster brother
- Frank Welker as Shep, monkeys, gorillas and Tookie
- Keith Scott as Narrator

== Production ==
Screenwriter Dana Olsen originally wrote a spec script titled Gorilla Boy, a parody of Tarzan told from the perspective of a wealthy American woman similar to the character of Jane. Although Olsen initially believed Disney would not be interested due to the studio having recently acquired the rights to the George of the Jungle animated series. Olsen's agent submitted the script, and Disney acquired it. He was subsequently hired to rewrite the existing screenplay.

Animal scenes in the film were created using a combination of live animals, puppetry, and computer-generated imagery.

Lions Joseph and Kaleb were trained by Charlie Sammut of Monterey Zoo (formerly Vision Quest Ranch) in Salinas, California. Sammut also served as Brendan Fraser's stunt double for a lion attack sequence.

The gorilla characters were portrayed by costumed performers from Jim Henson's Creature Shop. Additional visual effects were provided by Dream Quest Images.

The jungle environment was constructed on a soundstage in Playa del Rey, Los Angeles. The stage measured approximately 750 feet (230 m) in length, 90 feet (27 m) in width, and 71 feet (22 m) in height at its peak.

== Release ==
=== Box office ===
George of the Jungle debuted at number two at the North American box office, behind Men in Black, with $16.3 million in their first weekend.

=== Critical response ===
On Rotten Tomatoes, it holds an approval rating of 56% based on 52 reviews. The website's consensus reads: "George of the Jungle is faithful to its source material—which, unfortunately, makes it a less-than-compelling feature film." On Metacritic, it has a weighted average score of 53 out of 100, based on 18 reviews, indicating "mixed or average reviews." Audiences polled by CinemaScore gave the film a grade of "B+" on an A+ to F scale.

Roger Ebert awarded the film three out of four stars, describing it as "good-natured" and praising the comedic performances.

== Accolades ==
George of the Jungle was nominated for Best Fantasy Film at the 24th Saturn Awards.

== Home media ==
George of the Jungle was released by Walt Disney Home Video on VHS, DVD, and LaserDisc in the United States and Canada on December 2, 1997.

== Sequel ==
A sequel, George of the Jungle 2, was released direct-to-video on October 21, 2003. Directed by David Grossman, the film is set six years after the events of the original. Most principal roles were recast with new actors, though Keith Scott, Thomas Haden Church, John Cleese, and Kelly Miller reprised their respective roles.
