= Fractured Flickers =

Television series

- Genre: Comedy
- Created by: Chris Hayward
- Written by: Allan Burns; Chris Hayward; Lloyd Turner; George Atkins; Jim Critchfield; Bill Scott
- Presented by: Hans Conried
- Voices of: Paul Frees; June Foray; Bill Scott
- Opening theme: Dennis Farnon
- Composers: Dennis Farnon; Fred Steiner
- Country of origin: United States
- Original language: English
- No. of seasons: 1
- No. of episodes: 26

Production
- Executive producers: Ponsonby Britt, O.B.E.
- Producers: Jay Ward; Bill Scott
- Editors: Skip Craig; Roger Donley
- Running time: 30 minutes
- Production company: Jay Ward Productions

Original release
- Network: Syndication
- Release: 1 January 1963 – 1 January 1964

Fractured Flickers is a live-action syndicated half-hour comedy television program produced by Jay Ward, who is otherwise known for cartoons. The pilot film was produced in 1961 (hence the 1961 copyright notice on the animated main title), but the series was not completed until 1963. Twenty-six episodes were produced; they were syndicated by Desilu Productions and played for several years on local stations.

== Content ==
Short "flickers" were pieced together from silent film footage and from other older films, overdubbed with newly written comic dialogue, music, and sound effects. The voices for these were provided by fellow Ward mainstays Paul Frees, June Foray, and Bill Scott. The master of ceremonies was character actor and comedian Hans Conried. His arch remarks, eloquent vocabulary, and bemused observations lent a sort of seedy gentility to the proceedings, as a burlesque of such dignified broadcast commentators as Alistair Cooke and Edward R. Murrow.

The earliest episodes have careful dubbing, with the actors and writers taking pains to synchronize the new dialogue with the actors' lip movements. Once the series had deadlines to face, however, the time-consuming dubbing was abandoned, and the later episodes do not bother with exact synchronization. The concept anticipated Woody Allen's comic overdubbed film debut a few years later.

True to the Jay Ward brand of humor, the dialogue was loaded with puns and one-line jokes. One silent vignette was retitled "The Barber of Stanwyck", utilizing scenes from Douglas Fairbanks' 1920 silent classic, The Mark of Zorro. The canine serial Rin Tin Tin was satirized as "Foam, king of the mad dogs." Films, television, advertising, and even the Fractured Flickers series itself and executive producer were fair game for merciless kidding. (Conried quipped, "This is what we'll be doing for the next several weeks--or until someone finds out!") The show often desecrated early melodramas with "hip" reinterpretations, such as presenting Rudolph Valentino as an insurance salesman or Lon Chaney Sr.'s The Hunchback of Notre Dame as "Dinky Dunstan, Boy Cheerleader." (Lon Chaney Jr. was not amused by the latter and attempted unsuccessfully to sue Jay Ward over it.) Many segments were vicious satires of television commercials; a typical "word from our sponsor" would have the announcer extolling the virtues of the item being advertised, accompanied by darkly humorous clips. A fly-by-night real estate development, for example, was illustrated with clips of buildings being destroyed by a cyclone (from Steamboat Bill, Jr. with Buster Keaton). And "This moment of softness (explosions, wild parties, etc.) has been brought to you by Bee. Bee, the only tissue woven in mid-air by bees!" Regular features were the "Minute Mysteries", featuring a credited Stan Laurel as master detective Sherman Oaks (his scenes "fractured" from his 1925 short comedy, Dr. Pyckle and Mr. Pryde), and the weekly "tributes" to some American city ("that wonderful, wonderful town!").

Many prominent figures of the 1960s were lampooned, including TV icons such as "Uncle Walt" Disney (after signing off, "Well that oughta hold the little stinkers for tonight"). Bob Newhart's distinctive, hesitant delivery was frequently mimicked for droll narration. A segment based on the Kennedy family (and produced long before airtime) was excised from all copies of the series when John F. Kennedy was assassinated so that it was never shown; although a throwaway line to another character named John Fitzgerald slipped through. This segment remains lost to this day.

Each episode also featured a celebrity guest whom Conried would interview. Most were popular TV or film personalities of the 1960s such as Fabian, Bob Denver, Deborah Walley, Rod Serling, and Rose Marie. Many of them caught the spirit of the show, and answered Conried's scripted questions with tongue in cheek. Even Bob Newhart, often impersonated by Bill Scott on the program, agreed to appear on camera with a mock protest of the program.

== Guest stars ==
The following were guest stars:

1. Rose Marie 8-1-63
2. Fabian 8-8-63
3. Gypsy Rose Lee 8-15-63
4. Allan Sherman 8-22-63
5. Annette Funicello 8-29-63
6. Edward Everett Horton 9-5-63
7. Paula Prentiss 9-12-63
8. Sebastian Cabot 9-19-63
9. Roddy McDowall 9-26-63
10. Vivienne Della Chiesa 10-3-63
11. Connie Stevens 10-10-63
12. Rod Serling 10-17-63
13. Connie Hines 10-24-63
14. Cesar Romero 10-31-63
15. Diana Dors 11-7-63
16. Bullwinkle J. Moose 11-14-63
17. Deborah Walley 11-21-63
18. Paul Lynde 11-28-63
19. Anna Maria Alberghetti 12-5-63
20. Ruta Lee 12-12-63
21. Barbara Eden 12-19-63
22. Bob Denver 12-26-63
23. Pat Carroll 1-2-64
24. Bob Newhart 1-9-64
25. Ursula Andress 1-16-64
26. Zsa Zsa Gabor 1-23-64

An interview with Johnny Weissmuller was filmed but not used; the interview with the Bullwinkle puppet may have been filmed as its replacement. Co-producer Bill Scott (Bullwinkle's voice) appears briefly in two episodes, one as a delivery man and the other a clumsy stuntman who falls flat on his face.

== Home media ==
The complete series was released on DVD by VCI Entertainment in 2004.

As of 2022, reruns of the show aired on Movies! channel every Sunday morning. It also airs as a segment on Svengoolie during its Saturday night time slot on MeTV.
