= A Family Affair (1920 film) =

1920 short animated film

- Directed by: Vernon Stallings
- Produced by: John Randolph Bray
- Animation by: Leon Searl
- Color process: Black and white
- Production company: Bray Studios
- Distributed by: Goldwyn Pictures
- Release date: October 25, 1920
- Running time: 2:20
- Language: English

A Family Affair is a silent short animated film by Bray Studios featuring Krazy Kat. It is the sixth Krazy short produced by the studio.

== Plot ==
The short film

Three ratlings are playing in a front yard where they try to stack each other to form a tower. When their rat tower collapses and they get into a squabble, they are interrupted by the mother rat who tells them their father wants to take them for a walk. Although the father rat (Ignatz) declines to do so, the mother rat angrily hurls a stool in the house, compelling him to come out with the stroller which the ratlings board. When the father rat and the ratlings begin their walk, the other ratlings who are a swarm of dozens come along walking behind.

In the outdoors stands Krazy Kat who sees Ignatz and the ratlings walk by. Krazy comes along and praises the father rat for having a lot of children whom the cat sees are like devoted followers. Krazy also wishes he too has children to look up to him.

When Krazy, Ignatz and the rats reach Krazy's house, Krazy decides to stop while the rodents carry on in their walk. Momentarily, a stork comes out of his house, and happily greets Krazy before walking away. Immediately, a large pack of kittens also come out of the house, and greet Krazy as their dad. Krazy is most surprised by this as he unusually runs away on all fours, and the kittens run after him into the horizon.

== Home media ==
The short film was also released in 2004 in a DVD video compilation called George Herriman's Kinomatic Krazy Kat Kartoon Klassics.
