= Halfsies =

Breakfast cereal

Halfsies was a breakfast cereal manufactured by Quaker Oats from 1979 through 1984. It contained half the sugar of regular breakfast cereals and was half-corn and half-rice. The cereal nuggets were shaped as half a normal cereal ring, like the letter C.

The marketing campaign involved the fictional King of The Land of Half, who presided over The Land of Half. The box featured Half Land where houses, cars, food, etc. were all cut in half.
