= Alex Anderson (cartoonist) =

American cartoonist (1920–2010)

- Born: Alexander Hume Anderson Jr. September 5, 1920; Berkeley, Missouri
- Died: October 22, 2010 (aged 90); Carmel, California, U.S.
- Burial place: Woodlawn Memorial Park Cemetery
- Occupation: Cartoonist
- Relatives: Paul Terry (uncle)

Alexander Hume Anderson Jr. (September 5, 1920 – October 22, 2010) was an American cartoonist who created the characters of Rocky the Flying Squirrel, Bullwinkle, and Dudley Do-Right, as well as Crusader Rabbit. He was not directly involved in The Rocky and Bullwinkle Show, however.

== Biography ==
Alexander Hume Anderson Jr. was born September 5, 1920, in Berkeley, California, to Olga B. (née Terry) and Alexander H. Anderson Sr. He attended the University of California, Berkeley, and the California School of Fine Arts in San Francisco. He received an honorary degree from San Francisco Art Institute in 2000.

Anderson was a nephew of Mighty Mouse producer Paul Terry, and began his career in 1938, working summer vacations, during college, at his Terrytoons animation studio. Anderson served in Navy intelligence during World War II.

Anderson pitched a "limited animation" cartoon series for TV to his uncle, Paul Terry, but 20th Century Fox, who distributed Terrytoons cartoons, saw TV as a threat.

After the war, Anderson and Jay Ward, a former real-estate salesman and childhood friend, formed a business in the late 1940s to pitch cartoon ideas to television, including Crusader Rabbit, Rocky, Bullwinkle, and Dudley Do-Right. In 1948, Anderson and Ward created a television pilot, "The Comic Strips of Television"

Only Crusader Rabbit was accepted, and after Anderson's other cartoon ideas failed to sell, he joined a San Francisco advertising agency, becoming an art director, while Ward moved to Los Angeles to try to sell TV studios on a Bullwinkle series.

Anderson saw a 1991 documentary about the show which did not mention his name, he filed suit against Jay Ward Productions, two years after Jay Ward's death. Anderson, who had not received public recognition for creating Dudley Do-Right, Bullwinkle and Rocky, learned the characters had been copyrighted in Ward's name alone. Consequently, Anderson sued Ward's heirs to reclaim creator credit. In 1993 or 1996, (sources differ), Anderson received a settlement and a court order acknowledging him as "the creator of the first version of the characters of Rocky, Bullwinkle and Dudley."

Ted Key, creator of the comic strip Hazel, had a similar situation with his characters Mr. Peabody and his pet boy Sherman.

Anderson died due to complications of Alzheimer's disease at the age of 90 on October 22, 2010, at a nursing home in Carmel, California. He was survived by his wife of 36 years, Patricia Larsen Anderson, his third spouse following divorces from first wife Gail and second wife Beverly. He had two children from his first marriage, sons Terry and Scott, and three stepchildren, Matthew Kennedy, Carolyn Kennedy, and Daniel Kennedy.
