= Tom Slick (TV series) =

American animated television series

- Tom Slick in the Thunderbolt Grease-Slapper
- Starring: Bill Scott; June Foray; Paul Frees; Daws Butler
- Opening theme: Stan Worth; Sheldon Allman

Production
- Producers: Jay Ward; Bill Scott
- Production company: Jay Ward Productions, Inc

Original release
- Network: ABC
- Release: September 9 – December 30, 1967

Tom Slick is the cartoon star of a series of shorts that aired within the half-hour animated television series George of the Jungle (ABC, 1967). It was the work of Jay Ward Productions, the creators of Rocky & Bullwinkle and other satiric animated characters. Seventeen six-minute episodes were made.

== The premise ==
Freckled, grinning, all-American racecar driver Tom Slick (voiced by Bill Scott) competes in various races with his trusty vehicle, the Thunderbolt Grease-Slapper. He is accompanied by his girlfriend Marigold (voiced by June Foray) and his elderly mechanic Gertie Growler (also voiced by Bill Scott). The two women do not always get along well. A recurring antagonist is the evil Baron Otto Matic (voiced by Paul Frees), and the Baron's stupid lackey Clutcher (voiced by Daws Butler impersonating Frank Fontaine as "Crazy Guggenheim" ), whom the Baron has a penchant for hitting across the head with a monkey wrench. All episodes are narrated by a pastiche of then voice of the Indianapolis 500, Sid Collins.

A running gag throughout the series is that the Thunderbolt Grease-Slapper can be converted into virtually any type of racing vehicle, often looking nothing like the original vehicle itself. Various episodes show the Grease-Slapper as a train, stock car racer, drag racer, racing balloon, swamp buggy, submarine, even a miniaturized skateboard. Most of the races took place between Pittsburgh, Pennsylvania and Gary, Indiana.

As the theme song is sung, Tom's Thunderbolt Grease-Slapper suddenly "hops" out of control off a road and into a barnyard occupied by farm animals. Tom is knocked momentarily unconscious with a chicken sitting on top of his head as he drives straight into a brick wall. But he miraculously gets out of the sudden pandemonium as his car falls apart in mid-air and suddenly falls back together again. The car then jumps onto (and off) a stone monument bearing Tom Slick's name and gets back on the road as Tom waves his hand and smiles.

== Theme song ==
The theme song was written by the team of Stan Worth and Sheldon Allman, with Worth primarily composing the music and Allman handling the lyrics. The lyrics are as follows:

Tom Slick
Tom Slick
Let me tell you why
He's the best of all good guys
Tom Slick
Tom Slick
In the Thunderbolt Grease-Slapper, once he's on your tail,
He won't quit because you know there's no such word as "fail" to
Tom Slick
Tom Slick!

== Tom Slick in the comics ==
In comic books, Tom Slick appeared as a backup feature in Gold Key Comics's two-issue George of the Jungle title (1969).

== Episodes ==
=== List of Tom Slick episode titles and dates ===
Nº	Title	Air date
1	"The Bigg Race"	1967-09-09
2	"Monster Rally"	1967-09-16
3	"Send In a Sub"	1967-09-23
4	"Snow What"	1967-09-30
5	"The Great Balloon Race"	1967-10-07
6	"I Was Railroaded"	1967-10-14
7	"Dranko the Dragster"	1967-10-21
8	"The Cupp Cup Race"	1967-10-28
9	"Irish Cheapstakes"	1967-11-04
10	"Overstocked"	1967-11-11
11	"Double Cross Country Race"	1967-11-18
12	"The Apple-less Indian 500"	1967-11-25
13	"Sneaky Sheik"	1967-12-02
14	"Cheap Skate Board Derby"	1967-12-09
15	"The Badyear Blimp"	1967-12-16
16	"Swamp Buggy Race"	1967-12-23
17	"Mack Buster Trophy"	1967-12-30
