= The Great Cheese Robbery =

- Directed by: Vernon Stallings
- Produced by: John Randolph Bray
- Color process: Black and white
- Production company: Bray Studios
- Distributed by: Goldwyn Pictures
- Release date: January 16, 1920
- Running time: 3:33
- Language: English

The Great Cheese Robbery is a silent short animated film made by Bray Studios featuring Krazy Kat. It marks the first Krazy film produced by Bray after the International Film Service (IFS) ended its run in making films in the series.

== Plot ==
The short film

One evening, Krazy Kat pulls a newspaper from a trash barrel and reads of unsolved cheese robberies in town. Moments later he spots a masked Ignatz Mouse heading down the street and follows him.

Outside a cheese store, Walter, an ostrich policeman, hears footsteps approaching and, frightened, sticks his head in the ground, allowing Ignatz to enter the store unseen, as does Krazy moments later. Inside, Ignatz devours an entire wheel of cheese and crams another into his bag. Upon hearing a banging on the door, Ignatz hides and Krazy enters, only to be mystified by the empty room. Having been attracted by the racket, Walter comes in, mistakes Krazy for the bandit, and arrests him.

The next morning Ignatz is highly amused over a newspaper report of the arrest and the $10,000 bail for the prisoner. Soon he has a severe attack of conscience with illusions of monstrous shapes pointing accusing fingers at him. He snatches a sack of money from a hiding place, rushes to the police station and pays the bail. Krazy is astonished when he sees that it has been paid by Ignatz.

== Alternate ending ==
In a short version of the film called Rescued by a Guilty Conscience, which was distributed by a company called Keystone for their toy projectors, there is an alternate ending. In it, Krazy, upon being bailed, suddenly becomes more insane than usual as he starts seeing a ghostly marsupial in his wings as a result of being held in custody for many hours. As an act of generosity, Ignatz hurls the sack of cash at Krazy to snap the cat out of it.

== Home media ==
The short film was also released in 2004 in a DVD video compilation called George Herriman's Kinomatic Krazy Kat Kartoon Klassics.
