= Super Chicken =

Television series

- Starring: Bill Scott; Paul Frees
- Opening theme: Stan Worth; Sheldon Allman

Production
- Producers: Jay Ward; Bill Scott
- Running time: 6 minutes
- Production company: Jay Ward Productions, Inc

Original release
- Network: ABC
- Release: September 6 – December 30, 1967

Henry Cabot Henhouse III
- Super Chicken (a.k.a. Henry Cabot Henhouse III)
- Voiced by: Bill Scott

In-universe information
- Alias: Super Chicken
- Species: Chicken

Super Chicken is an American animated segment that ran on the animated television series George of the Jungle. It was produced by Jay Ward and Bill Scott, who earlier had created the Rocky and Bullwinkle cartoons. It debuted September 9, 1967, on ABC.

== History ==
Super Chicken was designed as a parody of the affluent WASP archetype of the 1950s—complete with martini drinking and a sense of social obligation. The character's civilian name, Henry Cabot Henhouse III, is a nod to politician Henry Cabot Lodge Jr. The character of Super Chicken is an exaggerated play on these traits, much like the crime-fighting millionaire Bruce Wayne/Batman, as well as earlier heroes like Zorro and the Scarlet Pimpernel.

The original pilot for Super Chicken included a cast featuring Don Knotts as the voice of Super Chicken and Bill Dana, but the project was shelved and eventually recast, with Bill Scott taking over the lead role, and Paul Frees, who impersonated Ed Wynn in his performance of the Fred character.

== Premise ==
Super Chicken is the alter-ego of wealthy Henry Cabot Henhouse III. His sidekick is Fred, a vegetarian lion. In his civilian life, Fred serves as Henhouse's butler. When trouble arises, Henhouse drinks his "Super Sauce"—often from a martini glass—prepared by Fred. He then transforms into the superhero Super Chicken, donning a plumed cavalier's hat, cape, Wellington boots, mask, and sword.

Fred's accoutrements consist of a well-coiffed mane, a red turtleneck sweater with a backwards white "F" on it, and a pair of white high top sneakers.

Super Chicken's adventures typically start with the Super Coop, their egg-shaped air vehicle, transporting them to fight crime. After battles, Fred often laments his injuries, prompting Super Chicken to reply with his catchphrase, "You knew the job was dangerous when you took it, Fred!" Episodes conclude with Super Chicken arresting the villain. Super Chicken's headquarters were located atop the Gulf Building, a real building located in downtown Pittsburgh.

== Theme song ==
The theme song was written by the team of Stan Worth and Sheldon Allman, with Worth primarily composing the music and Allman handling the lyrics. The lyrics are as follows:

When you find yourself in danger
When you're threatened by a stranger
When it looks like you will take a lickin' (puk, puk, puk, puk)
There is someone waiting who
Will hurry up and rescue you
Just call for Super Chicken! (puk ack!)

Fred, if you're afraid you'll have to overlook it
Besides you knew the job was dangerous when you took it (puk ack!)

He will drink his super sauce
And throw the bad guys for a loss
And he will bring them in alive and kickin' (puk, puk, puk, puk)
There is one thing you should learn
When there is no one else to turn to
Call for Super Chicken! (puk, puk, puk, puk)
Call for Super Chicken! (puk ack!)

== Episodes ==
| No. | Title | Directed by | Original release date |
|---|---|---|---|
| 1 | "The Zipper" | Gerard Baldwin | September 9, 1967 |
The elusive fiend dubbed the Zipper plans to blow up the world. Super Chicken and Fred try to track him down using his "zip code".
| 2 | "One of Our States Is Missing" | Jim Hiltz | September 16, 1967 |
The villainous Appian Way has stolen Rhode Island.
| 3 | "Wild Ralph Hiccup" | Jim Hiltz | September 23, 1967 |
A wily robber named Wild Ralph Hiccup (with a speech pattern resembling an obvious parody of John Wayne) robs airplane passengers at gunpoint, before diving out into the wild blue yonder. Super Chicken and Fred are soon hot on his trail — even if it means taking 26 flights back and forth from Miami, Florida, to Cedar Rapids, Iowa for four straight days.
| 4 | "The Oyster" | John Walker | September 30, 1967 |
A criminal disguised as an actual oyster steals the world's largest pearl.
| 5 | "The Easter Bunny" | Gerard Baldwin | October 7, 1967 |
It appears the Easter Bunny has turned to crime, robbing banks across the greater Pittsburgh area. But upon further investigation by Super Chicken and Fred, the culprit is actually Louie the Lapin, who was wearing an Easter Bunny disguise. Louie's plan is to dye U.S. currency because he hates the color green.: Note: Characters from Jay Ward's previous projects are seen at the beginning of this episode.
| 6 | "The Elephant Spreader" | Bill Hurtz | October 14, 1967 |
Elephants are popping up all over the world and their added weight is tilting the Earth sideways on its axis. The brains behind the world-tipping scheme is India's Prince Blackhole of Calcutta, who has concocted this scheme so that it can snow in India.
| 7 | "The Geezer" | Jim Hiltz | October 21, 1967 |
A cantankerous old Geezer has stolen the world-famous geyser "Old Faceful".
| 8 | "Rotten Hood" | Fred Calvert | October 28, 1967 |
Tired of stealing acorns from the squirrels residing in Sherwood Park, Rotten Hood, assisted by Fried Tucker, decides to steal from the rich and keep the loot.
| 9 | "The Laundry Man" | Bill Hurtz | November 4, 1967 |
Shrimp Chop Phooey the Laundry Man runs a money laundering racket disguised as a Chinese laundry. When he and his Number One Son make off with their customers' ill-gotten cash, Super Chicken and Fred must stop them and return the money to its rightful owners — the crooks that were his customers.
| 10 | "The Noodle" | Jim Hiltz | November 11, 1967 |
Super Chicken and Fred try to capture the Noodle, whose name comes from his many elaborately-thought out plans. However, one of his plans causes Super Chicken to develop amnesia. With nowhere else to turn to, Fred dons the mantle of his friend and tries to catch the Noodle himself.
| 11 | "The Fat Man" | Fred Calvert | November 18, 1967 |
The priceless Maltese Duck has been stolen by the Fat Man, an obese man in a brown suit.
| 12 | "Merlin Brando" | Pantomime Pictures (Fred Crippen) | November 25, 1967 |
A hermit wizard named Merlin Brando lives on the Isle of Lucy with his magic mirror. His magic mirror flatters Merlin with praise that he is the greatest one of all, until the magic mirror sees Super Chicken on television. Declaring there is not room in the world for "two greatests," Merlin decides to eliminate Super Chicken.
| 13 | "Salvador Rag Dolly" | Bill Hurtz | December 2, 1967 |
Crooked toymaker Salvador Rag Dolly uses large wind-up toys to infiltrate birthday parties and make off with household valuables. Super Chicken tries to stop the dastardly fiend, but soon comes face-to-face with Rag Dolly's latest creation: a wind-up toy Super Chicken.
| 14 | "Briggs Bad Wolf" | Jim Hiltz | December 9, 1967 |
Stage actor Briggs Bad Wolf becomes so enamored in his role that he believes that he really is a villain. He kidnaps the stage production's female lead Red Ridinghood and plans to have her attend a picnic. Now it's up to Super Chicken to save the actress and defeat Briggs Bad Wolf.
| 15 | "The Muscle" | Steve Clark | December 16, 1967 |
A bodybuilding criminal called the Muscle forces Super Chicken to exercise himself to exhaustion. Super Chicken attempts to recover his strength by drinking double-strength Super Sauce, but the volatile concoction proves too powerful for even him.
| 16 | "Dr. Gizmo" | Gerard Baldwin | December 23, 1967 |
Super Chicken and Fred have their work cut out for them as they try to recapture escaped gadget-inventing criminal mastermind Dr. Gizmo.
| 17 | "The Wild Hair" | Bill Hurtz | December 30, 1967 |
A mad scientist creates the world's first living toupee. However, it soon grows out of control and it's up to Super Chicken to figure out how to defeat it.

== Appearances in other media ==
In 1969, Gold Key Comics published two issues of a George of the Jungle comic book. Each issue contained a story featuring Super Chicken. Issue #1 presented "The Stolen State", and #2 "The Astounding Dr. Gizmo!", both adaptations of cartoon episodes.

== See also ==
- Chickenman (radio series)
