= George of the Jungle =

1967 American animated television series

- Cover to a George of the Jungle VHS tape
- Created by: Jay Ward; Bill Scott
- Directed by: Gerard Baldwin; Frank Braxton; Pete Burness; Paul Harvey; Jim Hiltz; Bill Hurtz; Lew Keller; John Walker
- Starring: Bill Scott; Paul Frees; June Foray; Daws Butler
- Opening theme: Stan Worth; Sheldon Allman
- Country of origin: United States
- Original language: English
- No. of episodes: 17 (51 segments)

Production
- Executive producers: Ponsonby Britt, O.B.E. Jay Ward; Bill Scott
- Producers: Jay Ward; Bill Scott
- Running time: 21 minutes
- Production company: Jay Ward Productions

Original release
- Network: ABC
- Release: September 9 – December 30, 1967

Related
- George of the Jungle (2007 TV series)

George of the Jungle is an American animated television series produced and created by Jay Ward and Bill Scott, who also created The Adventures of Rocky and Bullwinkle and Friends. The character George was inspired by the story of Tarzan and a cartoon characterization of George Eiferman (Mr. America, Mr. Universe, IFBB Hall of Famer) drawn by a cook on his minesweeper in the Navy during World War II. The series aired first-run for 17 episodes on Saturday mornings from September 9 to December 30, 1967, on the ABC-TV network. Then, rather than commissioning new episodes, the network was content to repeat the 17 episodes, keeping George of the Jungle on its Saturday schedule until September 1969 when it moved to Sunday mornings until September 19, 1970. This was the final animated series created and produced by Ward until his death in 1989.

== Program format ==
Each episode featured three segments in the form of three unrelated cartoons: George of the Jungle, Tom Slick, and Super Chicken. All three theme songs were written by the team of Stan Worth and Sheldon Allman, with Worth primarily composing the music and Allman handling the lyrics. Each of the cartoons ended with a strike on the tympani (kettle drum), which changed to an ascending tone, following a pun.

Unlike previous Ward series, the animation production was done in Hollywood using veteran animators Phil Duncan, Rod Scribner, and Rudy Zamora, among others. Ward mainstays Bill Scott, June Foray, Paul Frees, and Daws Butler provided most of the character voices over all three segments.

The cartoons are technically more advanced than the animation in Ward's earlier series, which originated from Gamma Productions, a Mexican studio sponsored by Ward. He was so pleased with George of the Jungle that he allowed production to go over budget, which resulted in considerable financial loss, ultimately limiting the series to 17 episodes.

In 2008, Classic Media and Genius Entertainment released the complete series on DVD.

== Segments ==
=== George of the Jungle ===
The title segment, George of the Jungle, is a parody of the Tarzan stories of Edgar Rice Burroughs. George (voiced by Bill Scott) is a dim-witted but big-hearted "ape man" who is always called upon by District Commissioner Alistair (voiced by Paul Frees) to save inhabitants of the jungle territory of Mbwebwe Province in Africa from various threats.

In the opening title, George is depicted swinging on vines, repeatedly slamming face-first into trees or other obstacles even as theme-song singers warn him to "watch out for that tree!" Another running gag is that George keeps forgetting that he lives in a treehouse, falling from it to the ground every time he leaves home.

George's "beloved mate" is Ursula (voiced by June Foray), a Jane-like character (the character was referred to as Jane in the first episode and original pilot) far brighter than George. George's closest friend is an ape named Ape (voiced by Paul Frees impersonating Ronald Colman) who, like Ursula, is far more intelligent than George. George has a pet elephant named Shep, who behaves like a lap dog, or, as George refers to him, a "great big peanut-lovin' poochie," and who George thinks is a dog. Also of note is the Tooky Tooky (or Tookie Tookie) bird, famous for his call: "Ah ah ee ee tooky tooky!"

George's two most frequent foes are a pair of stereotypical hunters named "Tiger" Titheridge (voiced by Daws Butler) and "Weevil" Plumtree (voiced by Paul Frees). Tiger, the taller of the two, wears a pith helmet and khakis, has a pencil moustache, and speaks in an Oxford accent, while Weevil talks like a pirate and wears a white t-shirt and shorts with a bush hat. Another one of George's recurring enemies is a mad scientist named Dr. Chicago (voiced by Daws Butler).

George, though hopelessly unintelligent, possesses substantial strength and jungle instincts that allow him to track down enemies. When trapped in a seemingly hopeless situation, he carries a miniature phrase book with numerous animal calls to summon help—although he usually gives the wrong call.

=== Tom Slick ===
Tom Slick features the title character (voiced by Bill Scott), a racecar driver who competes in races with his trusty vehicle, the Thunderbolt Greaseslapper. He is accompanied by his girlfriend Marigold (voiced by June Foray), and his elderly mechanic Gertie Growler (also voiced by Bill Scott). Tom's chief antagonists are Baron Otto Matic (voiced by Paul Frees) and his lackey Clutcher (voiced by Daws Butler impersonating Frank Fontaine as "Crazy Guggenheim"), whom the Baron often hits across the head with a monkey wrench when he messes up Otto's plots. Most of the races were between Pittsburgh and Muncie, Indiana.

=== Super Chicken ===
Super Chicken features the title character (voiced by Bill Scott in a Boston Brahmin accent), a superhero (who, in "real life", is wealthy Henry Cabot Henhouse III) with a vegetarian lion sidekick named Fred (voiced by Paul Frees impersonating Ed Wynn). Super Chicken usually begins his adventures with the battle cry, "To the Super Coop, Fred!", to which Fred replies, "Roger Willcox!" When Fred comments on his latest injury, Super Chicken responds with a variation on the theme, "You knew the job was dangerous when you took it, Fred!" Following his own mistakes, Super Chicken remarks, "I'm glad no one was here to see that!"

== Episodes ==
Each of the following episodes consists of a George of the Jungle cartoon, a Super Chicken cartoon, and a Tom Slick cartoon.

No.	Title	Directed by	Original release date
1	"The Sultan's Pearl" "The Zipper" "The Bigg Race"	Gerard Baldwin Gerard Baldwin Bill Hurtz	September 9, 1967
"The Sultan's Pearl": The Sultan's most priceless treasure, a 300 pound pearl, has been stolen by "Tiger" Titherage and "Weevil" Plumtree and George tries to get it back.; "The Zipper": The elusive fiend dubbed the Zipper plans to blow up the world. Super Chicken and Fred try to track him down using his "zip code".; "The Bigg Race": A wealthy man named Tiny Bigg is sponsoring a race Tom Slick must win so Gertie can pay the mortgage on her garage. Can Tom outsmart the dishonest Baron Otto Matic?
2	"The Malady Lingers On" "One of Our States Is Missing" "Monster Rally"	Pete Burness Jim Hiltz Lew Keller	September 16, 1967
"The Malady Lingers On": Shep is sick and the simple country witch doctor called by George requires three items for a cure that are hard to obtain.; "One of Our States Is Missing": The villainous Appian Way has stolen Rhode Island.; "Monster Rally": Tom races in a "monster rally" against actual monsters, including a werewolf, a Frankenstein monster and a vampire.
3	"Oo-oo Birds of a Feather" "Wild Ralph Hiccup" "Send In a Sub"	Frank Braxton Jim Hiltz Gerard Baldwin	September 23, 1967
"Oo-oo Birds of a Feather": A trend involving the tail feathers of the Oo-oo birds has poachers flocking to harvest them, including "Tiger" Titherage and "Weevil" Plumtree.; "Wild Ralph Hiccup": A wily robber named Wild Ralph Hiccup (with a speech pattern resembling an obvious parody of John Wayne) robs airplane passengers at gunpoint, before diving out into the wild blue yonder. Super Chicken and Fred are soon hot on his trail — even if it means taking plane flights back and forth from Miami, Florida, to Cedar Rapids, Iowa for four straight days (with Super Chicken also having bought tickets for 26 more trips, too).; "Send In a Sub": An undefeated submarine racing champion is known as "Lucky Pool" for the misfortunes keeping his opponents from winning. Is he lucky enough to remain undefeated when Tom Slick challenges him?
4	"Ungawa the Gorilla God" "The Oyster" "Snow What"	Bill Hurtz John Walker Bill Hurtz	September 30, 1967
"Ungawa the Gorilla God": George is forced by the Boondockie tribe to fight Ungawa the Gorilla God with both hands tied behind his back.; "The Oyster": A criminal disguised as an actual oyster steals the world's largest pearl.; "Snow What": Baron Otto Matic wagered all he had that he would win a snowmobile race, but Tom Slick had the Thunderbolt Grease-Slapper modified to enter the race.
5	"Little Scissor" "The Easter Bunny" "The Great Balloon Race"	Fred Calvert Gerard Baldwin Gerard Baldwin	October 7, 1967
"Little Scissor": Tiny Tony Tuxedo the Tip-Top Tailor from Tanganyika (a.k.a. Little Scissor) and his pygmies are committing crimes in the jungle and the city.; "The Easter Bunny": It appears the Easter Bunny has turned to crime, robbing banks across the greater Pittsburgh area. But upon further investigation by Super Chicken and Fred, the culprit is actually Louie the Lapin, who was wearing an Easter Bunny disguise. Louie's plan is to dye U.S. currency, because he hates the color green.; "The Great Balloon Race": This episode features the 9th Annual Balloon Race across the English Channel. Tom Slick is the favorite to win. "There's no such word as blow up in balloon racing, Marigold. Of course that doesn't mean it never happens." He is up against the Flying Salami piloted by Falinni Scalapinni; the Tokyo Teensy, the world's only transistorized balloon; the Stanley Steamer who plans to win with some British racing luck; and Baron Otto Matic with his toady Clutcher. Poor Clutcher gets hit on the head four times with a monkey wrench. The Stanley Steamer was shot down with the starting gun, Clutcher popped the Tokyo Teensy and Falinni Scalapinni tried to eat the Flying Salami. After some British racing luck, Clutcher and Gertie row like they have never rowed before to catch up with the Baron. With Marigold's help, a twist of fate (and his cannon) downs the Baron's balloon, allowing Tom to win as the only balloon to finish the race.
6	"Monkey Business" "The Elephant Spreader" "I've Been Railroaded"	Jim Hiltz Bill Hurtz John Walker	October 14, 1967
"Monkey Business": Ape is ape-napped.; "The Elephant Spreader": Elephants are popping up all over the world, and their added weight is tilting the Earth sideways on its axis. The brains behind the world-tipping scheme is India's Prince Blackhole of Calcutta, who has concocted this scheme so that it can snow in India.; "I Was Railroaded": Tom and Gertie enter a train race.
7	"Next Time, Take the Train" "The Geezer" "Dranko the Dragster"	Gerard Baldwin Jim Hiltz Fred Calvert	October 21, 1967
"Next Time, Take the Train": Dr. Chicago has developed a formula that causes all insects to become strong and aggressive.; "The Geezer": A cantankerous old Geezer has stolen the world-famous geyser "Old Faceful".; "Dranko the Dragster": In one of the fastest growing sports, Dick Two-Lane announces for the Forthcoming Drag Classic, sponsored by Arnold Forthcoming, the magnet king. Tom is up against the drag racing movie star, Steve McQueasy and his widescreen big wheeler; Harley Angel and his switch-blade top chopper; and for the first time a racer from outer space, Dranko the Dragster from the planet Merth. Gertie recently set the world speed record of 81 mph on her jet powered skateboard. "There's no such word as indecision in drag racing, Marigold." After Dranko drops a power pill into Gertie's skateboard, Tom is able to win the race and save Gertie at the same time. Dranko gets his just deserts thanks to tough guy Harley Angel.
8	"The Desperate Showers" "Rotten Hood" "The Cupp Cup Race"	Pete Burness Fred Calvert Jim Hiltz	October 28, 1967
"The Desperate Showers": Can George save Ursula from being sacrificed to the Great Ju-Ju by a rain-crazy witch doctor?; "Rotten Hood": Tired of stealing acorns from the squirrels residing in Sherwood Park, Rotten Hood, assisted by his band of Merry Man, Fried Tucker, decides to steal from the rich and keep the loot.; "The Cupp Cup Race": In this episode Tom is racing in the Sir Thomas Cupp Cup Race. The prize is the diamond studded Sir Thomas Cupp Cup, $50,000, and a year's supply of Sir Thomas Cupp's Jams and Jellies made from reconstituted catfish whiskers (Blechh!). For this race, Tom had to convert the Thunderbolt Grease-Slapper into a supersonic speedboat. "There's no such word as never in speedboat racing, Marigold." Tom is up against the Ten Putt Tide Ripper, the Back Burning Beach Bunny, and the Twin Pod Surf Slurper driven by the internationally known sissy Amsome Snobsworth V and his girlfriend Wilma Willow. Barron Otto Matic is not in this race, but Tom still has to deal with cheating from Amsome Snobsworth V. We learn that Gertie knows karate as she helps Tom out of his first jam of being tied to the dock at the start. "There's no such word as stop in speedboat racing, Marigold." Gertie is also capable of some mean water skiing in her hippy boots. Unfortunately, Amsome has a sea monster named Ringo Starfish (with one R) to swallow Tom. Luckily, Gertie renegotiated the deal and promised Ringo Starfish a year's supply of Sir Thomas Cupp's Jams and Jellies made from reconstituted catfish whiskers (Blechh!).
9	"Treasure of Sarah Madre" "The Laundry Man" "Irish Cheapstakes"	Pantomime Pictures (Fred Crippen) Bill Hurtz Gerard Baldwin	November 4, 1967
"Treasure of Sarah Madre": George and the District Commissioner follow a map to the treasure of Sarah Madre while evading "Tiger" Titherage and "Weevil" Plumtree.; "The Laundry Man": Shrimp Chop Phooey the Laundry Man runs a money laundering racket disguised as a Chinese hand laundry. When he and his Number One Son make off with their customers' ill-gotten cash, Super Chicken and Fred must stop them and return the money to its rightful owners — the crooks.; "Irish Cheapstakes": Violating the one-year ban from racing placed on him, Baron Otto Matic enters the Irish Cheapstakes under the name "Ott O'Matic".
10	"The Trouble I've Seed" "The Noodle" "Overstocked"	Bill Hurtz Jim Hiltz Jim Hiltz	November 11, 1967
"The Trouble I've Seed": Dr. Chicago has developed a formula that causes all plants to become sentient.; "The Noodle": Super Chicken and Fred try to capture the Noodle, whose name comes from his many elaborately-thought out plans. However, one of his plans causes Super Chicken to develop amnesia. With nowhere else to turn to, Fred dons the mantle of his friend and tries to catch the Noodle himself.; "Overstocked": Tom Slick modifies the Thunderbolt Grease-Slapper to enter it in a stock car race against Sweet Willy Rollbar.
11	"Dr. Schpritzer, I Presume?" "The Fat Man" "Double Cross Country Race"	Gerard Baldwin Fred Calvert Gerard Baldwin	November 18, 1967
"Dr. Schpritzer, I Presume?": Famous gall bladder surgeon Dr. Schpritzer goes missing and it is up to George, Ape, and Shep to find him, but someone does not want him found...; "The Fat Man": The priceless Maltese Duck has been stolen by the Fat Man, an obese man in a brown suit.; "Double Cross Country Race": This is the annual cross country race from Muncie, Indiana to Pittsburgh, Pennsylvania. Tom and that twisted evil genius and fussy eater, Baron Otto Matic, are racing for the Muncie to Pittsburgh trophy. At the start of the race, Baron Otto Matic gives Tom his trusty (and phony) road map. It frames Tom, Marigold, and Gertie by leading them in the least direct route through the boondocks of Arizona to Glendale, California. Poor Clutcher gets two conks on the head with a wrench. We do learn that the great thing about Pittsburgh is that it gets you out of Muncie. In the Ohio Desert, they barely escape the Cleveland Indians as Tom has driven his first no hitter. "There's no such word as quit in racing, Marigold." Apparently the word grit does exist in racing. Tom is able to win after the Baron gets stuck on the cloverleaf, then stuck in Friday afternoon traffic, and finally gets a ticket for driving through a red light, thanks to Gertie's clever motorcycle cop disguise.
12	"Rescue Is My Business" "Merlin Brando" "The Apple-less Indian 500"	Fred Calvert Pantomime Pictures (Fred Crippen) John Walker	November 25, 1967
"Rescue Is My Business": A greedy witch doctor becomes George's "manager" and is encouraging him to make people pay for being rescued. Ape does not mind George collecting pay, but thinks the manager is exploiting him when George gets exhausted.; "Merlin Brando": A hermit wizard named Merlin Brando lives on the Isle of Lucy with his magic mirror. His mirror flatters Merlin with praise that he is the greatest one of all, until the mirror sees Super Chicken on television. Declaring there is not room in the world for "two greatests," Merlin decides to eliminate Super Chicken.; "The Apple-less Indian 500": Some Indians learned in the worst way that apples do not grow in the desert. Now their land is the set of a motorized wheel race.
13	"Big Flop at the Big Top" "Salvador Rag Dolly" "Sneaky Sheik"	Bill Hurtz Bill Hurtz Bill Hurtz	December 2, 1967
"Big Flop at the Big Top": "Tiger" Titherage and "Weevil" Plumtree are contracted by a circus owner to capture George. They come up with different plans, only to be thwarted at every end by those who George has previously helped.; "Salvador Rag Dolly": Crooked toymaker Salvador Rag Dolly uses large wind-up toys to infiltrate birthday parties and make off with household valuables. Super Chicken tries to stop the dastardly fiend, but soon comes face-to-face with Rag Dolly's latest creation: a wind-up toy Super Chicken.; "Sneaky Sheik": Tom is racing in the desert, but one of his rivals, the Sneaky Sheik, has sabotaged the Thunderbolt Grease-Slapper.
14	"Chi Chi Dog" "Briggs Bad Wolf" "Cheap Skate Board Derby"	Steve Clark Jim Hiltz Fred Calvert	December 9, 1967
"Chi Chi Dog": George is sent on a mission to bring back the rare and precious Chi Chi Dog and finds out just how rare they really are.; "Briggs Bad Wolf": Stage actor Briggs Bad Wolf becomes so enamored in his role that he believes that he really is a villain. He kidnaps the stage production's female lead Red Ridinghood and plans to have her attend a picnic. Now it's up to Super Chicken to save the actress and defeat Briggs Bad Wolf.; "Cheap Skate Board Derby": All the parts of the Thunderbolt Grease-Slapper (now the Thunderbolt Grease-Slipper) are transistorized so Tom can enter a motorized skateboarding race.
15	"A Man for All Hunting Seasons" "The Muscle" "The Badyear Blimp"	Pete Burness Steve Clark Bill Hurtz	December 16, 1967
"A Man for All Hunting Seasons": Having hunted all possible kinds of animals with his latest one being a Tasmanian aardvark, a hunter decides to hunt George at his wife's suggestion.; "The Muscle": A bodybuilding criminal called the Muscle forces Super Chicken to exercise himself to exhaustion. Super Chicken attempts to recover his strength by drinking double-strength Super Sauce, but the volatile concoction proves too powerful for even him.; "The Badyear Blimp": The Badyear Company sponsors a blimp race. Baron Otto Matic enters his lackey Clutcher in the race.
16	"The Forest's Prime Evil" "Dr. Gizmo" "Swamp Buggy Race"	John Walker Gerard Baldwin Fred Calvert	December 23, 1967
"The Forest's Prime Evil": George, Ursula, and Ape are evicted from the jungle by the evil builder Jerry Mander to make room for a housing development. Hopefully, the powerful spirit Tee Nee Tee will come to their rescue.; "Dr. Gizmo": Super Chicken and Fred have their work cut out for them as they try to recapture escaped gadget-inventing criminal mastermind Dr. Gizmo.; "Swamp Buggy Race": Trying to take advantage of Tom Slick's manners as a gentleman, Baron Otto Matic disguises himself as a woman named Wilma May Boomdocker, while Clutcher disguises himself as an alligator.
17	"Kings Back-to-Back" "The Wild Hair" "Mack Buster Trophy"	Bill Hurtz Bill Hurtz Pantomime Pictures (Fred Crippen)	December 30, 1967
"Kings Back-to-Back": George must win re-election for King of the Jungle against Seymour Nodnick, the world's richest tycoon, who wants to dig up the jungle for the rare element whatchamacallium.; "The Wild Hair": A mad scientist creates the world's first living toupee; however, it soon grows out of control.; "Mack Buster Trophy": Gertie mortgages her garage so Tom could afford to turn the Thunderbolt Grease-Slapper into an airplane and enter an airplane race.

== Home media ==
On February 12, 2008, Classic Media released a complete collection of the 1967 series which included, as a bonus feature, the original pilot cartoons for both George of the Jungle and Super Chicken.

== Reception ==
In 2002, TV Guide ranked George of the Jungle #30 on its "50 Greatest Cartoon Characters of All Time" list.

== Spin-offs ==
=== Comic book ===
Gold Key Comics published two issues of a comic book based on the series in 1969.

=== Films ===
In 1997, the segment was adapted into a live-action film, titled George of the Jungle. Brendan Fraser played the title role, with Leslie Mann as Ursula, John Cleese as the voice of Ape and Thomas Haden Church as the villain, Lyle Van De Groot. A direct-to-video sequel, George of the Jungle 2, starring Christopher Showerman as George and Julie Benz as Ursula, was released in 2003.

=== 2007 series ===
Classic Media developed a new George of the Jungle Flash animation series 40 years later in 2007. It now utilizes a co-production. The new version of the series is co-produced with Studio B Productions and Teletoon Canada (with other studios also involved), and currently airs on Teletoon in Canada and on Cartoon Network in the United States (starting with a Christmas-themed episode December 21, 2007). The series was scheduled to air on Nicktoons in the United Kingdom and Disney Channel Asia in Southeast Asia. The series officially premiered on Cartoon Network on January 18. Both seasons are available digitally on iTunes.

The series initially ran 26 episodes, with two George stories per episode for a total of 52 stories. In 2016, 26 additional episodes were made, also with two George stories per episode.

== Cultural references ==
"Weird Al" Yankovic did a cover version of the George of the Jungle theme on Dare to Be Stupid (1985), the only straight cover Yankovic ever released on an album, and which later appeared on the soundtrack of the 1997 live-action film. The music video for "Like a Surgeon", also from Dare to Be Stupid, features a doctor watching a clip of the TV series.

Another cover of the theme by The Presidents of the United States of America also appeared on the soundtrack and was the title theme for the film.

The Rhino Records 1989 release Rerun Rock: Superstars Sing Television Themes included a cover version performed in the style of "Whole Lotta Love" by Led Zeppelin and sung by Scott Shaw.
