= Hoppity Hooper =

Television series

- DVD cover
- Also known as: Uncle Waldo's Cartoon Show
- Genre: Comedy
- Created by: Bill Scott; Chris Hayward
- Written by: Chris Jenkyns; Bill Scott
- Directed by: Pete Burness; Bill Hurtz; Lew Keller
- Starring: Waldo Wigglesworth, Fillmore Bear, and Hoppity Hooper
- Voices of: Chris Allen; Hans Conried; Paul Frees (1–100 only); Bill Scott; Alan Reed (1–2 only); William Conrad (101–104 only)
- Narrated by: Paul Frees; William Conrad
- Theme music composer: Dennis Farnon
- Opening theme: "Olga Moletoad's Ride"
- Composer: Dennis Farnon
- Country of origin: United States
- Original language: English
- No. of seasons: 3
- No. of episodes: 52 (104 segments) (list of episodes)

Production
- Executive producer: Peter M. Piech
- Producers: Jay Ward; Bill Scott
- Editor: Skip Craig
- Running time: 30 minutes
- Production companies: Jay Ward Productions; P.A.T.

Original release
- Network: ABC
- Release: September 12, 1964 – September 2, 1967

Hoppity Hooper is an American animated television series produced by Jay Ward, and sponsored by General Mills, originally broadcast on ABC from September 12, 1964, until 1967. It is one of the earliest Saturday morning cartoons and Jay Ward's first original one for this schedule. The series was produced in Hollywood by Jay Ward and Bill Scott, with animation done in Mexico City by Gamma Productions.

== Premise ==
The three main characters are Hoppity Hooper, a plucky frog, voiced by Chris Allen; Waldo P. Wigglesworth, a patent medicine-hawking fox, voiced by Hans Conried, who posed as Hoppity's long-lost uncle in the pilot episode; and Fillmore, a bear wearing a Civil War hat and coat, (poorly) playing his bugle, voiced by Bill Scott (with Alan Reed portraying the character in the pilot). The stories revolved around the three main characters, who lived in Foggy Bog, Wisconsin, seeking their fortune together through different jobs or schemes, usually ending in misadventure.

Each story consisted of four short cartoons, one aired at the beginning and end of each episode, with the four-part story shown over two consecutive episodes. Much like Jay Ward's previous series Rocky and Bullwinkle, Hoppity Hooper used pun-based titles to identify each upcoming segment and a narrator (voiced by Paul Frees and later by William Conrad), who often interacted with the characters and broke the fourth wall. Interspersed were recycled second features from the earlier series Peabody's Improbable History, Fractured Fairy Tales, Aesop and Son and The World of Commander McBragg. In later syndicated runs, each four-part story was assembled into a single half-hour episode.

== Background ==
Early versions of Waldo and Fillmore, under the names "Sylvester Fox" and "Oski Bear," were included in the proposed series The Frostbite Falls Revue, the unsold concept that would eventually form the basis of Rocky and Bullwinkle. The two-part pilot was produced in 1960 and featured Alan Reed as Fillmore. Production did not begin on the series until September 1964, after Rocky and Bullwinkle had ended its run; by 1964, Reed was committed to the role of Fred Flintstone on The Flintstones and was unavailable, and Bill Scott took over the role; the pilot aired as produced with Reed's voice as the first two segments.

The series was broadcast first-run by ABC on their Saturday morning schedule. The series was later syndicated to local television stations under the title Uncle Waldo's Cartoon Show, beginning in 1965.

== Episodes ==
Over the course of three seasons, 52 episodes were broadcast with two segments of Hoppity Hooper each. With two exceptions (as noted), each story line consisted of four episodes (or four shorts – making 27 stories told over 104 segments).

=== Season 1 (1964–65) ===
Episodes	Title
1 & 2	Ring a Ding Spring
3 & 4	Rock 'n' Roll Star
5 & 6	Diamond Mine
7 & 8	Costra Nostra
9 & 10	The Giant of Hoot 'n' Holler
11 & 12	Detective Agency
13 & 14	Olympic Star
15 & 16	Ghost
17 & 18	The Masked Martin
19 & 20	Jumping Frog Contest
21 & 22	The Traffic Zone
23 & 24	Wottabango Corn Elixir
25 & 26	Frog Prince of Monomania

=== Season 2 (1965–66) ===
Episodes	Title	Parts
27 & 28	Colonel Clabber—Limburger Cheese Statue	(4 parts)
29 & 30	The Giant Cork	(4 parts)
31 & 32	Ferkle to Hawaii	(4 parts)
33 & 34	Hallowe'en	(4 parts)
35 & 36	Christmas	(4 parts)
37 & 38	Horse Race Follies	(4 parts)
39 & 40	Jack and the Beanstalk	(4 parts)
41 & 42	Granny's Gang	(4 parts)

=== Season 3 (1966–67) ===
Episodes	Title	Parts
43	Golf Tournament	(2 parts)
44	The Hopeless Diamond	(2 parts)
45 & 46	The Dragon of Eubetchia	(4 parts)
47 & 48	Rare Butterfly Hunt	(4 parts)
49 & 50	Oil's Well at Oasis Gardens	(4 parts)
51 & 52	Wonder Water	(4 parts)

== Production ==
- Producers: Jay Ward, Bill Scott
- Directors: Pete Burness, Bill Hurtz, Lew Keller
- Writers: Chris Jenkyns, Bill Scott
- Film Editor: Skip Craig
- Designers: Sam Clayberger, Roy Morita, and Shirley Silvey
- Animation by Gamma Productions S.A. de C.V.
- Production Director: Harvey Siegel
- Assistant Director: Jaime Torres
- Animation Supervisor: Sam S. Kai
- Layout Supervisor: Joe Montell
- Executive Producers: Peter Piech, Ponsonby Britt, O.B.E. (pseudonym of Jay Ward and Bill Scott)
- A Jay Ward Production
- In cooperation with Producers Associates of Television, inc.

== Voice cast ==
- Chris Allen - Hoppity Hooper
- Hans Conried - Uncle Waldo P. Wigglesworth
- Alan Reed (eps. 1) and Bill Scott (eps. 2-52) – Fillmore Bear
- Paul Frees (eps. 1–50) and Bill Conrad (eps. 51–52) – Narrator

== Home video ==
Hoppity Hooper was released in three separate volumes on VHS in the early 1990s. Volume One was released on DVD in the 2000s (the copyrights for each of these three releases were in question at the time of their respective releases).

In 2008, Mill Creek Entertainment released episodes 1–6 and 8–11 as part of the Giant 600 Cartoon Collection. They also re-released these episodes as part of the Super 300 Cartoon Collection in 2009. Also in 2008, Mill Creek re-released episodes 1–6 as part of the 200 Classic Cartoons: Collectors Edition.
