= Sheldon Allman =

American-Canadian actor, singer, and songwriter

- Born: June 8, 1924; Chicago, Illinois, U.S.
- Died: January 22, 2002 (aged 77); Culver City, California, U.S.
- Resting place: Hillside Memorial Park Cemetery
- Education: Los Angeles Conservatory of Music
- Occupations: Actor; singer; songwriter
- Years active: 1958–1995

Sheldon Allman (June 8, 1924 – January 22, 2002) was an American-Canadian actor, singer, and songwriter.

== Early life and career ==
Allman was born in Chicago, Illinois. He began his singing career with the Royal National Guard during his World War II service with the Royal Canadian Air Force. He moved to Los Angeles in 1949, to attend the Los Angeles Conservatory of Music. After it, he appeared in 12 films, including such notable films as Nevada Smith, The Sons of Katie Elder, Hud and In Cold Blood. His co-stars included, respectively, Steve McQueen, John Wayne and Paul Newman. He also made appearances in numerous TV series during the 1960s and 1970s.

On television, Allman provided the voice of Big H in CB Bears on CBS and played Norm Miller in Harris Against the World on NBC. He provided music on the game show Three for the Money on NBC, and he was the singing voice for TV's Mister Ed, for which he also wrote and recorded "The Pretty Little Filly with the Ponytail" and "The Empty Feedbag Blues". Mr. Allman wrote longer versions of these songs, but never recorded the longer versions. He was the lyricist for the theme song to George of the Jungle. Additionally, Allman worked with Stan Worth, co-writer of the "George of the Jungle" theme, to create music for a number of game shows by Stefan Hatos-Monty Hall Productions, including the 1970s versions of Let's Make a Deal, Masquerade Party and It Pays to be Ignorant.

In 1960, Allman released Folk Songs for the 21st Century, an album of novelty songs all revolving around science-fiction themes. The tongue-in-cheek material, which Allman wrote and arranged himself, included titles such as "Crawl Out Through The Fallout" and "Radioactive Mama." "Crawl Out Through The Fallout" is used in the video game Fallout 4 and the 2024 TV adaptation Fallout during the closing credits of its first episode.

In addition, Allman co-wrote two comedy horror-themed stage musicals with Bobby Pickett, composer of the hit novelty song, "Monster Mash." The musicals were I'm Sorry the Bridge Is Out, You'll Have to Spend the Night and its sequel, Frankenstein Unbound, the former of which was made into the 1995 film, Monster Mash.

== Death ==
On January 22, 2002, Allman died of heart failure at his home in Culver City, California, at age 77. His interment is in Culver City's Hillside Memorial Park Cemetery.

== Filmography ==
Year	Title	Role	Notes
1959	Inside the Mafia	Dyer	Uncredited
1959	Gunsmoke	Bill	"The Coward" (S4E26)
1960	The Twilight Zone	First Alien	
1963	Hud	Mr. Thompson	
1964	Good Neighbor Sam	Hotel Desk Clerk	Uncredited
1965	The Sons of Katie Elder	Harry Evers	
1966	Nevada Smith	Sheriff	
1967	In Cold Blood	Rev. Jim Post	
1969	Joniko and the Kush Ta Ka	Narrator	
1970	I Dream of Jeannie		Uncredited
1971	Dirty Harry		Uncredited
1974	Little House on the Prairie		Uncredited
1976	All the President's Men		Uncredited
