= Jay Ward =

American animator and television producer (1920–1989)

- Born: Joseph Ward Cohen Jr. September 20, 1920; San Francisco, California, U.S.
- Died: October 12, 1989 (aged 69); Los Angeles, California, U.S.
- Resting place: Forest Lawn Memorial Park, Glendale
- Education: University of California, Berkeley; Harvard Business School
- Occupations: Animator, TV producer, Writer
- Years active: 1942–1984
- Notable work: The Rocky and Bullwinkle Show; George of the Jungle
- Spouse: Ramona Compton (m. 1943)
- Children: 3
- Awards: Inkpot Award (1977)

Photographs
- Jay Ward, with Bullwinkle puppet on left hand
- Jay Ward, with Rocky & Bullwinkle characters

Joseph Ward Cohen Jr. (September 20, 1920 – October 12, 1989), known professionally as Jay Ward, was an American animator and producer. He is best known for creating The Adventures of Rocky and Bullwinkle and Friends, alongside works featuring a diverse selection of characters such as Crusader Rabbit, Rocky & Bullwinkle, Dudley Do-Right, Mr. Peabody, Hoppity Hooper, George of the Jungle, Tom Slick, and Super Chicken. His own company, Jay Ward Productions, designed the trademark characters for the Cap'n Crunch, Quisp, and Quake breakfast cereals and it made TV commercials for those products. Ward produced the non-animated series Fractured Flickers (1963) that featured comedic redubbing of silent films.

== Early life ==
Jay Ward was born Joseph Ward Cohen Jr., the son of Joseph Ward Cohen (1890–1967) and Mercedes Juanita (née Troplong) Ward (1892–1972). He was raised in Berkeley, California, attending Frances E. Willard Intermediate School as "J. Ward".

He obtained his undergraduate degree at the University of California, Berkeley. In 1947, he obtained his MBA from Harvard Business School.

== Early career ==
In 1947, the first day that Ward opened his first real estate office at the corner of Ashby and Claremont, a runaway truck crashed through the building and pinned Ward. While recuperating, Ward decided to animate cartoons, but kept his real estate business, later moving it to Domingo Avenue and then Tunnel Road, where it stayed, in Berkeley, even after Ward moved to Los Angeles. He later received incorrect medical treatment while hyperventilating in an airplane. He then developed agoraphobia.

== Animation career ==
Ward moved into the young mass medium of television with the help of his childhood friend, the animator Alex Anderson. Taking the character Crusader Rabbit to NBC-TV and the pioneering distributor of TV-programs, Jerry Fairbanks, they put together a pilot film, The Comic Strips of Television, featuring Crusader Rabbit, Hamhock Bones, a parody of Sherlock Holmes, and Dudley Do-Right, a bumbling Canadian Mountie.

NBC-TV and Fairbanks were both unimpressed with all but Crusader Rabbit. The animated series Crusader Rabbit premiered in 1948 and continued its initial run through 1952. Adopting a serialized, mock-melodrama format, it followed the adventures of Crusader and his dimwitted sidekick Rags the Tiger. It was, in form and content, much like the series that would later gain Ward enduring fame, Rocky and His Friends.

=== Rocky and Bullwinkle ===
Ward and Anderson lost the rights to the Crusader Rabbit character in a legal fight with businessman Shull Bonsall, who had taken over the assets of the bankrupt Jerry Fairbanks company, and a new color Crusader Rabbit series under a different producer premiered in 1956. Ward then pursued an unsold series idea, The Frostbite Falls Revue. Taking place in a TV studio in the North Woods, the proposed series featured a cast of eccentrics such as newsman Oski Bear and two minor characters named Rocky the Flying Squirrel and Bullwinkle J. Moose, described in the script treatment as a "French-Canadian moose."

Rocky and His Friends premiered in the late afternoon, after American Bandstand on ABC in 1959, then moved to prime-time on NBC as The Bullwinkle Show in 1961. The series contained a mix of sophisticated and low-brow humor. Thanks to animators from United Productions of America, Ward's genial partner Bill Scott (who contributed to the scripts and voiced Bullwinkle and other characters) and their writers, including Chris Hayward, and Allan Burns, puns were used often and shamelessly. In a "Fractured Fairy Tales" featuring Little Jack Horner, upon pulling out the plum, Jack announced, "Lord, what foods these morsels be!" Self-referential humor was another trademark: in one episode, the breathless announcer (William Conrad) gave away the villain's plans, prompting the villain to grab the announcer from offscreen, bind and gag him, and deposit him visibly within the scene. The show skewered popular culture, taking on such subjects as advertising, college sports, the Cold War, and TV itself. The hapless duo from Frostbite Falls, Minnesota, blundered into unlikely adventures much as Crusader and Rags had before them, pursued by "no-goodnik" spies Boris Badenov and Natasha Fatale, perennially under orders to "keel moose and squirrel".

As a running joke, many of Ward's cartoon characters had the middle initial "J." The cartoonist Matt Groening later gave the middle initial "J." to many of his characters as a tribute to Jay Ward.

Ward fought many heated battles over content with the network and sponsor. The "Kirward Derby", a bowler hat that made everyone stupid and Bullwinkle a genius, was named (as a spoonerism) for Durward Kirby, sidekick of the 1950s and 1960s TV host Garry Moore and the co-host of Allen Funt's Candid Camera. When Kirby threatened to sue, Ward quipped, "Please do! We need the publicity!"

An eccentric and proud of it, Ward was known for pulling an unusual publicity stunt that coincided with a national crisis. Ward leased an island on the Canadian border in Minnesota near his home and dubbed it "Moosylvania," based upon the home of his Bullwinkle TV character. He and publicist Howard Brandy crossed the country in a van, gathering signatures on a petition for statehood for Moosylvania. They then visited Washington, D.C., and attempted to gain an audience with President John F. Kennedy. Unfortunately, they arrived at the White House the morning the Cuban Missile Crisis was breaking, and were ordered at gunpoint to drive off.

== Personal life and death ==
Ward married Ramona "Billie" Compton in 1943; the couple had three children: Ron, Carey, and Tiffany.

Ward died of renal cancer in West Hollywood on October 12, 1989, and is buried in Glendale's Forest Lawn Memorial Park Cemetery.

== Legacy ==
The offices of Jay Ward Productions were located across the street from the Chateau Marmont on the Sunset Strip. In 2007, the building could be identified by a statue of Bullwinkle and Rocky, located in front. In 2013, the statue was reported by the Los Angeles NBC affiliate KNBC to have been removed from its location by DreamWorks Animation, which previously owned the licensing rights to the Jay Ward catalogue. DreamWorks Animation had stated that they intended to restore the statue as soon as repairs were completed on it; however, as of May 2014, the statue's whereabouts and status were unknown. It had been speculated that DreamWorks intended to relocate the statue to its own headquarters. In late 2014 (ran until 4 January 2015) the statue was temporarily housed at the Paley Center for Media, in Beverly Hills, California, in conjunction with "The Jay Ward Legacy Exhibit". The Jay Ward family gifted the refurbished statue to the City of West Hollywood as part of its Urban Art collection. On Feb 28th, 2020, the Bullwinkle statue finally received its permanent home when it was installed on the island at Sunset Blvd. and Holloway Drive, right across from where Tower Records and Spago had been.

Following Ward's death, Alexander Anderson Jr., who had created the initial conceptions of the characters Dudley Do-Right, Bullwinkle and Rocky, but had not received public recognition, learned the characters had been copyrighted in Ward's name alone. He sued Ward's heirs to reclaim credit as a creator, and in either 1993 or 1996 (sources differ), Anderson received a financial settlement and a court order acknowledging him as the "creator of the first version of the characters of Rocky, Bullwinkle, and Dudley."

On June 21, 2000, Ward was recognized with a star on the Hollywood Walk of Fame at 7080 Hollywood Boulevard for his contribution to the television industry, as part of the publicity for the live-action and animation film The Adventures of Rocky and Bullwinkle.

Until it closed in July 2004, the Dudley Do-Right Emporium, which sold souvenirs based on Ward's characters and was largely staffed by Ward and his family, operated on Sunset Boulevard.
