= Dudley Do-Right =

Canadian Mountie cartoon character

- The Adventures of Rocky and Bullwinkle and Friends character
- First appearance: The Comic Strips of Television (1948)
- Created by: Alex Anderson; Chris Hayward; Allan Burns; Jay Ward; Bill Scott
- Voiced by: Bill Scott (1959–1985); Scott Wilson (WYME TV Animated Skits for Bullwinkle's Restaurant); Keith Scott (The Adventures of Rocky and Bullwinkle Show, Pandemonium Cartoon Circus, Cartoon Network commercial, Rocky & Bullwinkle's Know-It-All Quiz Game, Dudley Do-Right's Ripsaw Falls)
- Portrayed by: Brendan Fraser

In-universe information
- Occupation: Mountie
- Significant other: Nell Fenwick
- Nationality: Canadian

Dudley Do-Right is a fictional character created by Alex Anderson, Chris Hayward, Allan Burns, Jay Ward, and Bill Scott, who appears as the main protagonist of "Dudley Do-Right of the Mounties", a segment on The Adventures of Rocky and Bullwinkle and Friends.

The segment parodies early 20th-century melodrama and silent film (the "Northern"), using only a piano as a musical background.

Dudley Do-Right's first appearance specifically incorporates silent film tropes such as intertitles and iris shots, as well as incorporating a similar plot to 1921 silent film O'Malley of the Mounted, starring William S. Hart.

== Overview ==
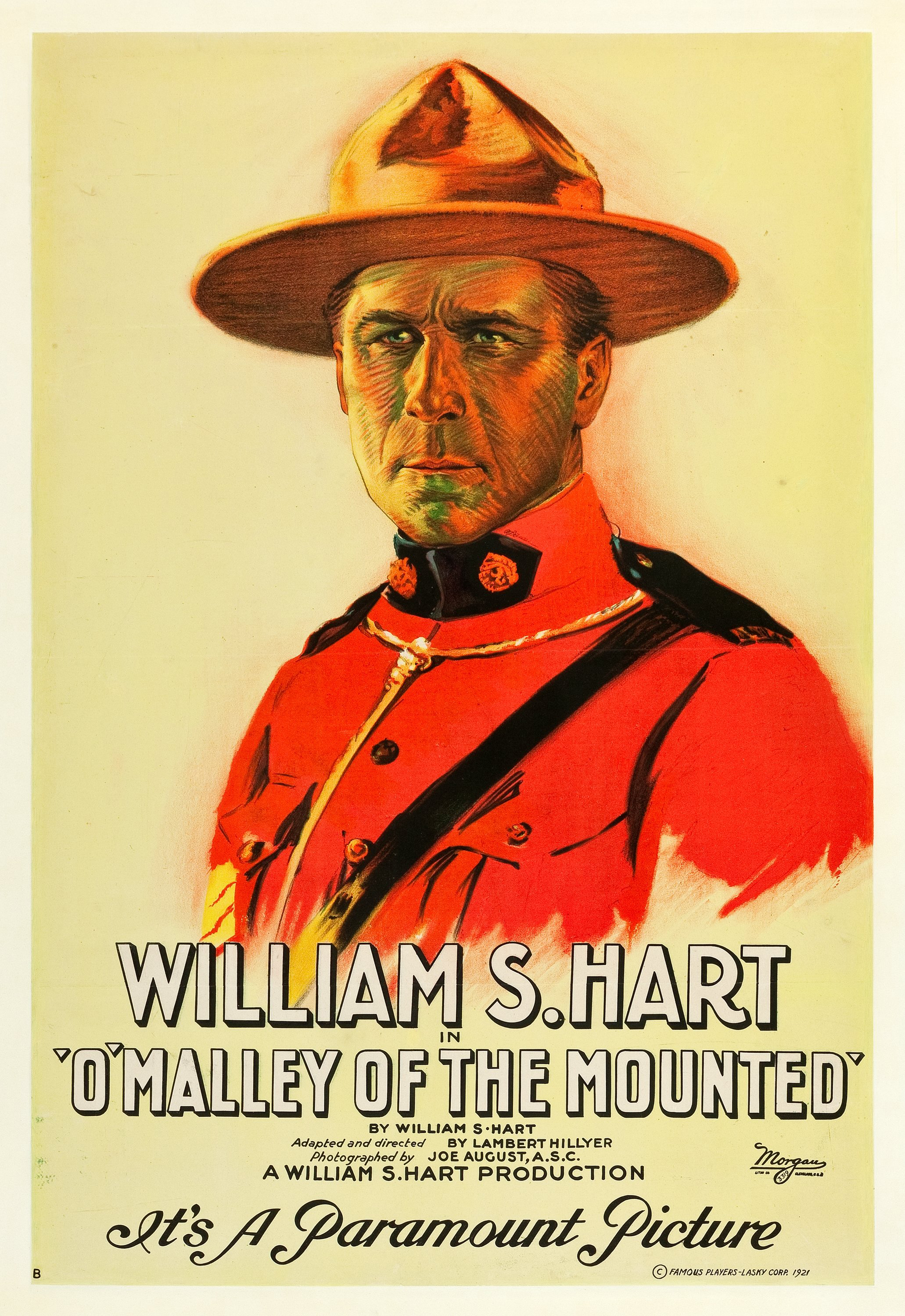
The segments' characters and plot lampooned such films as William S. Hart's 1921 silent drama film O'Malley of the Mounted.

The segment of The Comic Strips of Television in which Dudley first appears.

Dudley Do-Right is a dim-witted, but conscientious and cheerful Canadian Mountie who works for Inspector Fenwick. Do-Right is always trying to catch his nemesis, Snidely Whiplash, and rescue Inspector Fenwick's daughter, damsel-in-distress Nell Fenwick, with whom Do-Right is deeply infatuated. He usually succeeds only by pure luck or through the actions of his horse, named "Horse".

A running gag throughout the series is Nell Fenwick's disinterest in Do-Right; instead, she appears to be infatuated with his horse. She is shown to kiss the horse rather than Do-Right, and when Do-Right leaves the Mounties, she is only upset about the horse leaving. In Do-Right's first appearance, the narrator states,

Dudley loved Nell. Unfortunately, she loved his horse.

In the standard intro, Do-Right jumps on Horse and furiously rides him backwards as titles appear. Musical accompaniment is a c. 1900 style virtuoso trumpet rendition loosely resembling the William Tell Overture, played by Uan Rasey. While riding, he comes across Whiplash tying Nell Fenwick to a railroad track, accompanied by musical bridge by low trombones. The trumpet fanfare returns as Do-Right reappears; he tips his hat to the two, before realizing what is going on and righting himself in time to save the day.

Dudley Do-Right made a cameo in a "Rocky and Bullwinkle Fan Club" segment as the hero in "She Can't Pay the Rent", a play staged by Boris Badenov. Rocky and Bullwinkle also appeared as cameos in "Mountie Bear".

== The Dudley Do-Right Show ==
The Dudley Do-Right Show is an animated television series assembled by P.A.T. Film Services, consisting of cartoons produced by Jay Ward Productions and Total Television that aired Sunday mornings on American Broadcasting Company (ABC) from April 27, 1969, to September 6, 1970. Each half-hour show included two segments each of "Dudley Do-Right of the Mounties" and "The World of Commander McBragg", along with one segment each of "Tooter Turtle" and "The Hunter". Dudley Do-Right was a Jay Ward production, while the other segments were products of Total Television. Both companies used Gamma Productions, a Mexico-based animation studio.

The U.S. syndicated version of The Dudley Do-Right Show, called Dudley Do Right and Friends, follows the same format but features different episodes. The syndicated package features "Dudley Do-Right of the Mounties", "The World of Commander McBragg", "The King and Odie", and "The Hunter". The latter two originally appeared as part of King Leonardo and His Short Subjects, a series that aired between October 15, 1960, and September 28, 1963, on NBC-TV. Twenty-six new segments of both series were produced for CBS-TV's Tennessee Tuxedo and His Tales in 1963, and these later segments are included in the syndicated Dudley Do Right and Friends.

Voice actors (voice overs) included:

- Bill Scott — Dudley Do-Right
- June Foray — Nell Fenwick
- Hans Conried — Snidely Whiplash
- Paul Frees — Inspector Fenwick/Narrator
- William Conrad did several (but not all) of the narrations.
- Evan Cox - cameo in The Actors Challenge

== Segments ==
=== Season 1 ===
1. The Disloyal Canadians
2. Stokey the Bear
3. Mortgagin' the Mountie Post
4. Trap Bait
5. The Masked Ginny Lynn

=== Season 2 ===
1. The Centaur
2. Railroad Tracks
3. Foreclosing Mortgages
4. Snidely Mounted Police
5. Mother Love
6. Mountie Bear
7. Inspector Dudley Do-Right
8. Recruiting Campaign
9. Out of Uniform
10. Lure of the Footlights
11. Bullet-Proof Suit
12. Miracle Drug
13. Elevenworth Prison
14. Saw Mill
15. Finding Gold
16. Mountie Without a Horse
17. Mother Whiplash's Log Jam
18. Stolen Art Masterpiece

=== Season 3 ===
1. Mechanical Dudley
2. Flicker Rock
3. Faithful Dog
4. Coming-Out Party
5. Robbing Banks
6. Skagway Dogsled-Pulling Contest
7. Canadian Railway's Bridge
8. Niagara Falls
9. Snidely's Vic Whiplash Gym
10. Marigolds
11. Trading Places

=== Season 4 ===
1. Top Secret
2. The Locket
3. The Inspector's Nephew
4. Matinee Idol
5. Snidely Arrested

One segment originally seen on The Bullwinkle Show, "Stokey the Bear", was withheld from all reissues of the series for several decades because the U.S. Forest Service objected to the image of a bear that started forest fires, even though he had been hypnotized by Snidely to do so. The segment was released on home video by Sony Wonder and Classic Media in 2005.

== Legacy ==
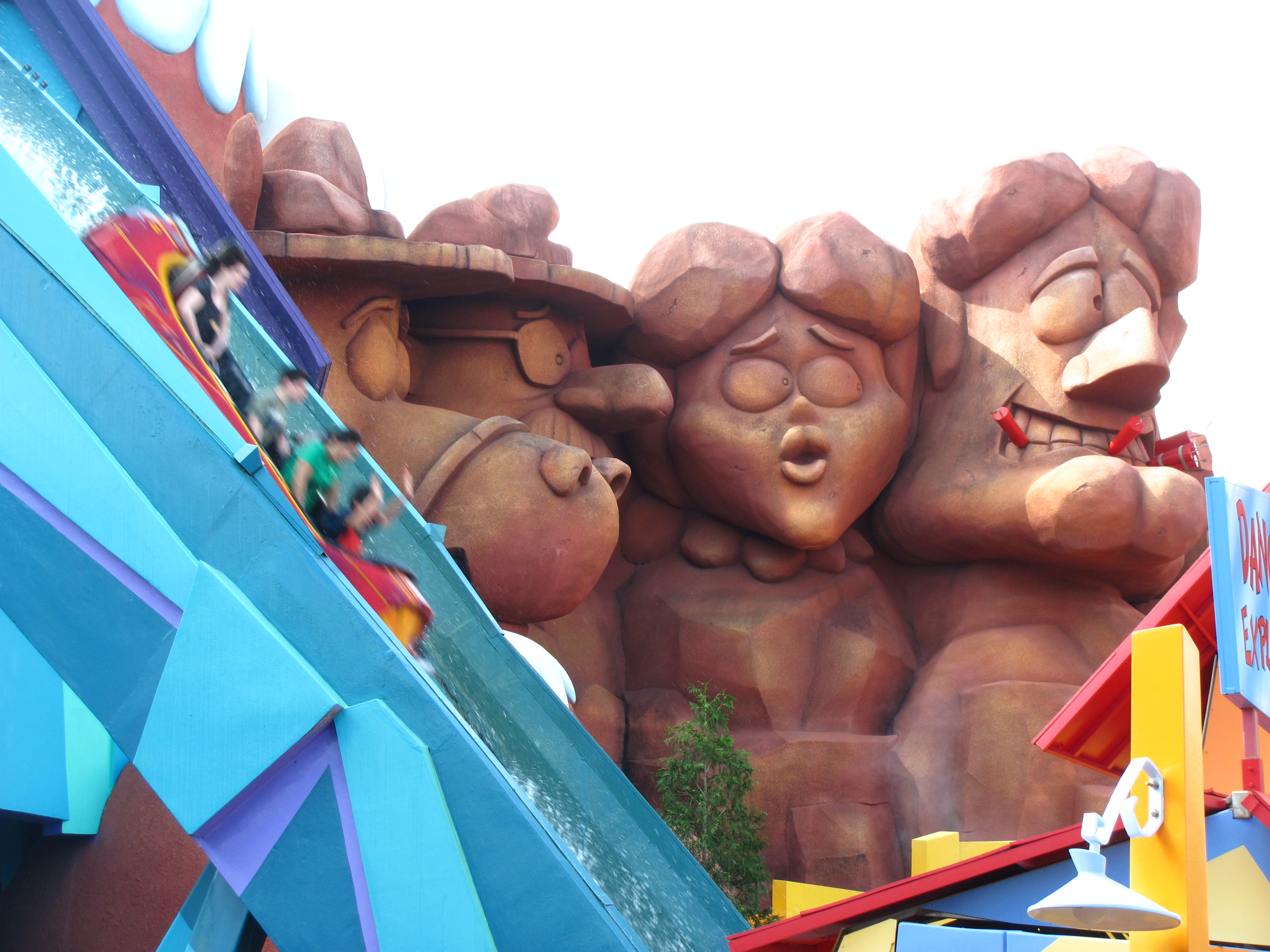
The Dudley-Do Right's Ripsaw Falls log flume ride features a parody of Mount Rushmore with (left to right) Horse, Fenwick, Nell, and Do-Right.

On May 28, 1999, Universal Islands of Adventure opened Dudley Do-Right's Ripsaw Falls, a log flume ride based on the cartoon segments. Guests enter a queue themed to resemble a theater, with Dudley, Nell, Snidely, and Horse presented as actors. Riders board cartoon logs and journey "into" the story, where Snidely has cruelly captured Nell Fenwick. Horse and Dudley make their first appearance in front of a cyclorama backdrop, theatrically "charging" to the rescue. The ride system contains three drops, the last and steepest of which is seventy-five feet. It is a hybrid flume/coaster that utilizes steel track to not only shoot guest-filled logs down the final drop, but under the water's surface and over a bunny hill. The ride system was designed and built by Mack GmbH.

On August 27, 1999, Universal Studios released a comedy live-action film based on the character, titled Dudley Do-Right. It stars Brendan Fraser, Sarah Jessica Parker, and Alfred Molina. It received negative reviews and was a box-office failure, grossing less than $10 million domestically against a $22 million budget.

In 2000, music historian Irwin Chusid claimed that scat singer Shooby Taylor's voice reminded him of Dudley Do-Right's "virile baritone."

Premiering in 2013, the Canadian adult animated series Fugget About It features a dimwitted yet well-meaning Mountie character, Strait McCool. McCool exhibits similar appearance, voice acting, behavior, and personality to Do-Right (except for the addition of sexual and drug references). It may be inferred that the character of McCool is a parody of Do-Right.

== See also ==
- The Dover Boys, a 1942 Warner Brothers cartoon parodying silent film era storytelling
