= Bill Scott (voice actor) =

American actor, writer and producer (1920–1985)

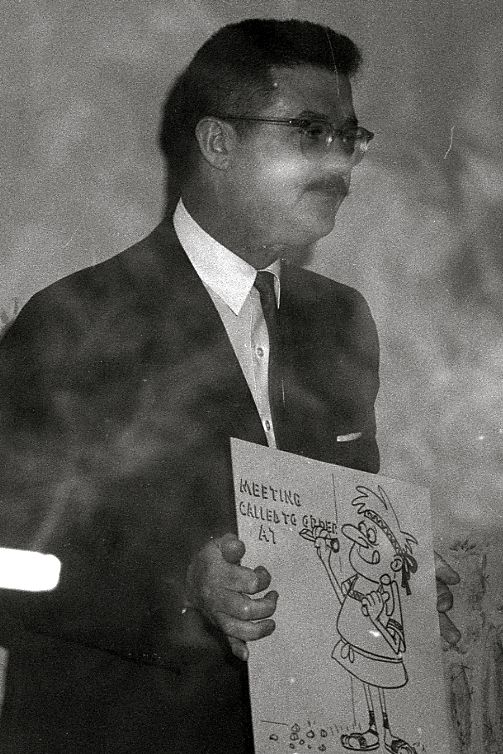
- Scott holding one of his drawings, 1962
- Born: William John Scott; August 2, 1920; Philadelphia, Pennsylvania, U.S.
- Died: November 29, 1985 (aged 65); Tujunga, Los Angeles, California, U.S.
- Occupations: Voice actor, writer, producer
- Years active: 1945–1985
- Spouse: Dorothy Scott (m. 1943)
- Children: 3

William John Scott (August 2, 1920 – November 29, 1985) was an American voice actor, writer and producer for animated cartoons, primarily associated with Jay Ward and UPA, as well as one of the founding members of ASIFA-Hollywood. He is probably best known as the head writer, co-producer and the voice of several characters from the popular programs Rocky and His Friends and The Bullwinkle Show.

== Early life ==
Scott was born in Philadelphia, Pennsylvania on August 2, 1920. The family later moved to Trenton, New Jersey. At the age of 15, Bill developed tuberculosis. Having been told that Denver, Colorado was the best place for tuberculosis treatment, the family moved to Denver in 1936. His father worked there as a machinist, and his mother worked as a waitress at the Brown Palace Hotel. Scott graduated from South High School in Denver, and then graduated from the University of Denver in 1941. He majored in Theater and Dramatic Art, and minored in English. He was trained to be a school teacher, but after trying teaching, he decided he wanted a different career. He then worked as a freelance radio performer on several Denver radio stations.

== Career ==
During World War II, he served in the U.S. Army's First Motion Picture Unit (reporting to Lt. Ronald Reagan), where he worked with such animators as Frank Thomas. After the war, he became what was then known as a "story man" at Warner Bros. Cartoons, working under director Arthur Davis. After a job as a writer on Bob Clampett's Time For Beany television puppet show, he later worked at United Productions of America where he was one of the writers who adapted Dr. Seuss's original story for the 1950 Academy Award-winning short Gerald McBoing-Boing, which later became a television show, as well as adapting the 1953 Academy Award-nominated short film of Edgar Allan Poe's The Tell-Tale Heart. He was later let go by UPA. Scott believed this was because UPA was under political pressure during the Red Scare of the 1950s. He believed UPA that consequently dismissed his co-writer for participating in left-wing activities, and threw out Scott as well in the process.

Scott then went on to work on animated cartoons for John Sutherland Productions. This work was mainly on behalf of business organizations, such as the United States Chamber of Commerce. While this work reflected more conservative values than his own, he stayed there for four years because the company paid its writers well. He grew weary of the messages his employer wanted in his work, and tried to leave, but said "I kept trying to tell them I quit, but they kept stuffing my mouth with money." He finally left and went back to work for UPA for a time.

Scott worked as a voice actor as well when he joined Jay Ward as head writer and co-producer, and voice acted in such television series as The Bullwinkle Show (most notably as Bullwinkle and Mister Peabody, as well as Dudley Do-Right). In a 1982 interview, Scott said, "I got a call from Jay [Ward] asking if I'd be interested in writing another series, an adventure script with a moose and a squirrel. I said, 'Sure.' I didn't know if I could write an adventure with a moose and a squirrel, but I never turned down a job." Scott never received an on-screen credit for his voice acting on any of the Ward series.

He also wrote many commercials for General Mills because General Mills had financed much of The Rocky and Bullwinkle Show, and the Quaker Oats Company, most notably those for Cap'n Crunch cereal. The voices of Rocky, Nell Fenwick and many of the feminine roles were performed by June Foray, although Scott's wife, Dorothy, voiced several female parts as well.

Scott was a voice director on The Gerald McBoing-Boing Show and a dialogue director on the 1959 animated comedy feature film 1001 Arabian Nights.

He starred in the George of the Jungle series as George, Super Chicken, and Tom Slick, as well as Fractured Flickers and Hoppity Hooper. Scott also did live-action acting on the television show The Duck Factory, which starred Jim Carrey, as well as featuring noted voice actors Don Messick and Frank Welker. In the episode "The Annie Awards", Scott plays the emcee at an award ceremony for cartoonists.

Scott was a member of the Screen Cartoonist's Guild of which he was president in 1952. He was also a member of the Screen Actors Guild and was elected to the Board of Governors of the Academy of Motion Picture Arts and Sciences.

== Later career ==
Toward the end of his career, Scott worked for Disney, where he voiced Moosel on The Wuzzles, and was Gruffi Gummi, Sir Tuxford, and Toadwart, aka Toadie in Disney's Adventures of the Gummi Bears (he was succeeded by Corey Burton, Roger C. Carmel, and Brian Cummings after his death). Gummi Bears, his last role, had also reunited him with June Foray, his Rocky and Bullwinkle co-star. Scott was also a singer and performer, active with a Little Theatre group in Tujunga called the Foothill Curtain Raisers, and a church theater, the Ascension Players. He was a member of the choir at Ascension Episcopal Church, Tujunga, and spent time in church leadership there as Senior Warden. He was also a member of the Cañada-Savoy G&S troupe in La Cañada, California.

== Death ==
Scott died of a heart attack at age 65 on November 29, 1985, in Tujunga, Los Angeles, California. He was cremated, and his ashes were scattered in the Santa Barbara Channel off Ventura.
