= 1940s =

Decade of the Gregorian calendar (1940–1949)

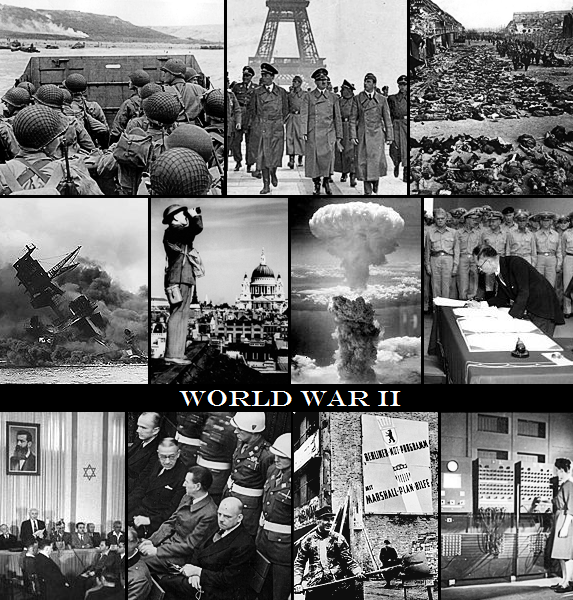
Above title bar: events during World War II (1939–1945): From left to right: Troops in an LCVP landing craft approaching Omaha Beach on D-Day; Adolf Hitler visits Paris, soon after the Battle of France; The Holocaust occurs as Nazi Germany carries out a programme of systematic state-sponsored genocide, during which approximately six million European Jews are killed; The Japanese attack on the American naval base of Pearl Harbor launches the United States into the war; An Observer Corps spotter scans the skies of London during the Battle of Britain and The Blitz; The creation of the Manhattan Project leads to the atomic bombings of Hiroshima and Nagasaki, the first uses of nuclear weapons, which kill over a quarter million people and lead to the Japanese surrender; Japanese Foreign Minister Mamoru Shigemitsu signs the Instrument of Surrender on behalf of the Japanese Government, on board USS Missouri, effectively ending the war. Below title bar: events after World War II: From left to right: The Declaration of the State of Israel in 1948; The Nuremberg trials are held after the war, in which the prominent members of the political, military, and economic leadership of the defeated Nazi Germany are prosecuted; After the war, the United States carries out the Marshall Plan, which aims at rebuilding Western Europe; ENIAC, the world's first general-purpose electronic computer.

The 1940s (pronounced "nineteen-forties" and commonly abbreviated as "the '40s" or "the Forties") was a decade that began on January 1, 1940, to December 31, 1949.

Most of World War II took place in the first half of the decade, which had a profound effect on most countries and people in Europe, Asia, and elsewhere. The consequences of the war lingered well into the second half of the decade, with a war-weary Europe divided between the jostling spheres of influence of the Western world and the Soviet Union, leading to the beginning of the Cold War. To some degree internal and external tensions in the post-war era were managed by new institutions, including the United Nations, the welfare state, and the Bretton Woods system, facilitating the post–World War II economic expansion, which lasted well into the 1970s. The conditions of the post-war world encouraged decolonization and the emergence of new states and governments, with India, Pakistan, Israel, Vietnam, and others declaring independence, although rarely without bloodshed. The decade also witnessed the early beginnings of new technologies (such as computers, nuclear power, and jet propulsion), often first developed in tandem with the war effort, and later adapted and improved upon in the post-war era.

The world population increased from about 2.25 to 2.5 billion over the course of the decade, with about 850 million births and 600 million deaths in total.

== Politics and wars ==
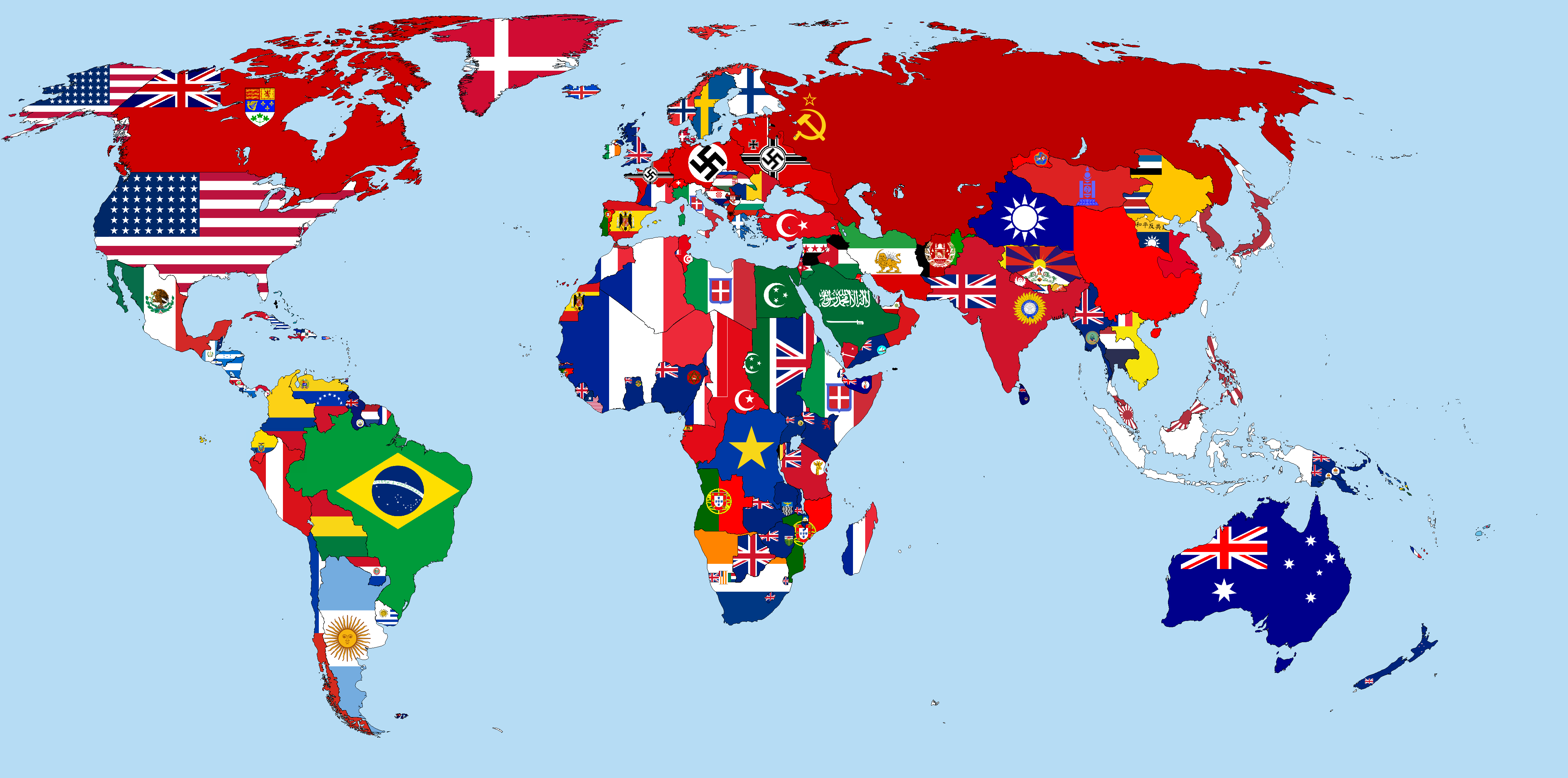
Flag map of the world from 1942, during World War II

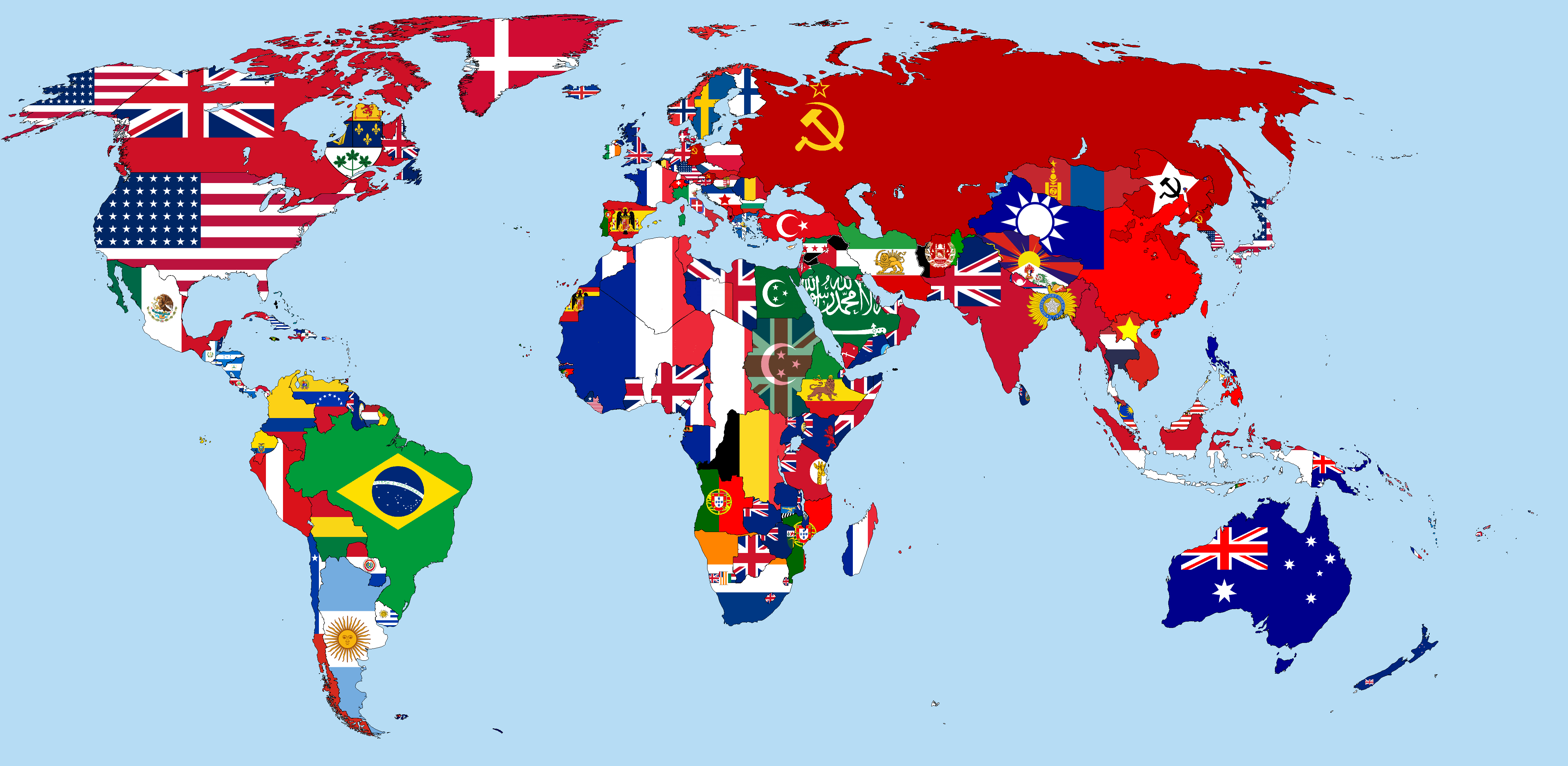
Flag map of the world from 1946, during post-WW2 era

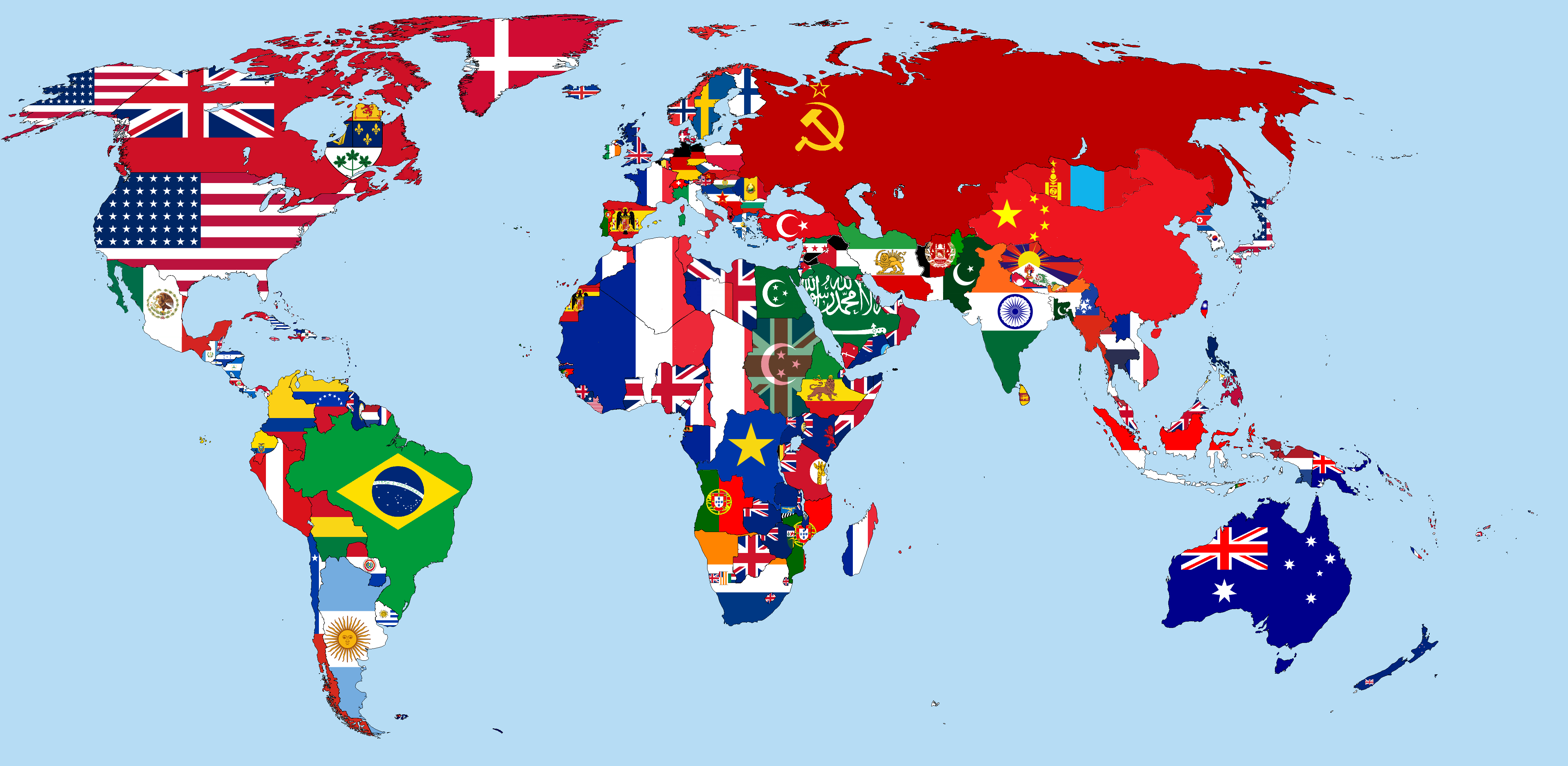
Flag map of the world from 1949.

=== Wars ===
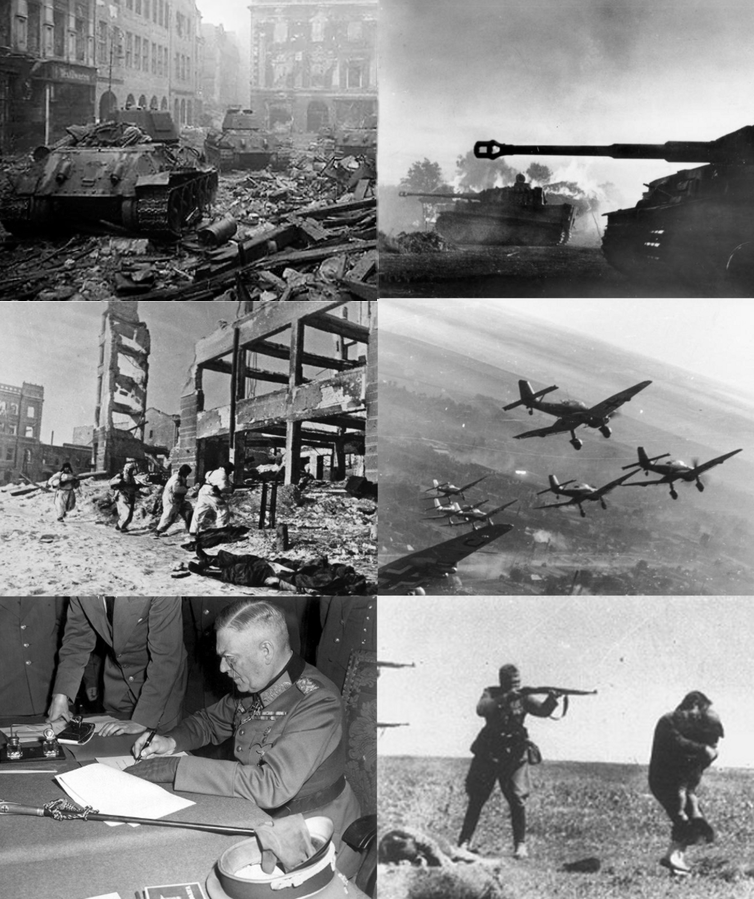
World War II

In Green: German Reich at its peak (1942): Germany Civilian-administered occupied territories (Reichskommissariat and General Government) Military-administered occupied territories (Militärverwaltung)

- World War II (1939–1945)
  - Nazi Germany invades Poland, Denmark, Norway, Benelux, and the French Third Republic from 1939 to 1941.
  - Soviet Union invades Poland, Finland, occupies Latvia, Estonia, Lithuania and Romanian region of Bessarabia from 1939 to 1941.
  - Germany faces the United Kingdom in the Battle of Britain (1940). It was the first major campaign to be fought entirely by air forces, and was the largest and most sustained aerial bombing campaign up until that date.
  - Germany attacks the Soviet Union (June 22, 1941).
  - Continuation War (Second Soviet-Finnish War), was a conflict fought by Finland and Nazi Germany against the Soviet Union from 25 June 1941 – 19 September 1944.
  - The United States enters World War II after the attack on Pearl Harbor on December 7, 1941. It would face the Empire of Japan in the Pacific War.
  - Germany, Italy, and Japan suffer defeats at Stalingrad, El Alamein, and Midway in 1942 and 1943.
  - Warsaw Ghetto Uprising in 1943 was the largest Jewish uprising in Nazi-occupied Poland.
  - Warsaw Uprising against Nazis in 1944 in Poland was the single largest military effort taken by any European resistance movement during World War II. The United States Army Air Forces send support for Poles on September 18, 1944, when flight of 110 B-17s of the 3 division Eighth Air Force airdropped supply for soldiers.
  - Normandy landings. The forces of the Western Allies land on the beaches of Normandy in Northern France (June 6, 1944).
  - Yalta Conference, wartime meeting from February 4, 1945, to February 11, 1945, among the heads of government of the United States, the United Kingdom, and the Soviet Union—President Franklin D. Roosevelt, Prime Minister Winston Churchill, and Premier Joseph Stalin, respectively—for the purpose of discussing Europe's postwar reorganization, intended to discuss the re-establishment of the nations of war-torn Europe.
  - The Holocaust, also known as The Shoah (Hebrew: השואה, Latinized ha'shoah; Yiddish: חורבן, Latinized churben or hurban) is the term generally used to describe the genocide of approximately six million European Jews during World War II, a program of systematic state-sponsored extermination by Nazi Germany, under Adolf Hitler, its allies, and collaborators. Some scholars maintain that the definition of the Holocaust should also include the Nazis' systematic murder of millions of people in other groups, including ethnic Poles, the Romani, Soviet civilians, Soviet prisoners of war, people with disabilities, gay men, and political and religious opponents. By this definition, the total number of Holocaust victims is between 11 million and 17 million people.
  - Soviet repressions of Polish citizens (1939–1946)
  - The German Instrument of Surrender signed (May 7–8, 1945). Victory in Europe Day.
  - Atomic bombings of Hiroshima and Nagasaki (August 6 and August 9, 1945); Surrender of Japan on August 15.
  - World War II officially ends on September 2, 1945.
- Indo-Pakistani wars and conflicts
  - Indo-Pakistani War of 1947
- Arab–Israeli conflict (Early 20th century–present)
  - 1948 Arab–Israeli War (1948–1949) – The war was fought between the newly declared State of Israel and its Arab neighbours. The war commenced upon the termination of the British Mandate of Palestine in mid-May 1948. After the Arab rejection of the 1947 United Nations Partition Plan for Palestine (UN General Assembly Resolution 181) that would have created an Arab state and a Jewish state side by side, Egypt, Iraq, Jordan, Lebanon and Syria attacked the state of Israel. In its conclusion, Israel managed to defeat the Arab armies.
- Indonesian War of Independence (1945–1949)
- First Indochina War (1946–1954)

=== Major political changes ===
- Establishment of the United Nations Charter (June 26, 1945) effective (October 24, 1945).
- Establishment of the defence alliance NATO April 4, 1949.

=== Internal conflicts ===
- Afghan tribal revolts of 1944–1947
- 1947–1948 Civil War in Mandatory Palestine.
- Victory of Chinese Communist Party led by Mao Zedong in the Chinese Civil War.
- Beginning of Greek Civil War, which extends from 1946 to 1949.

=== Decolonization and independence ===
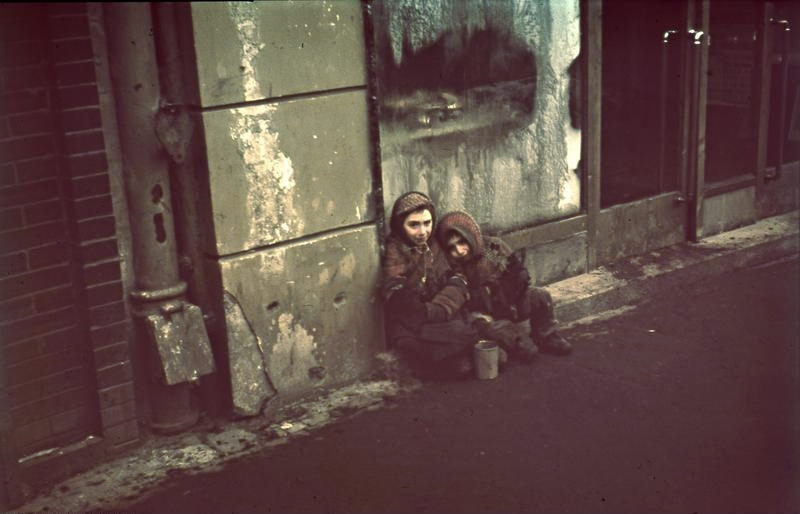
Warsaw Ghetto (1940–1943), photographed using Agfacolor process.

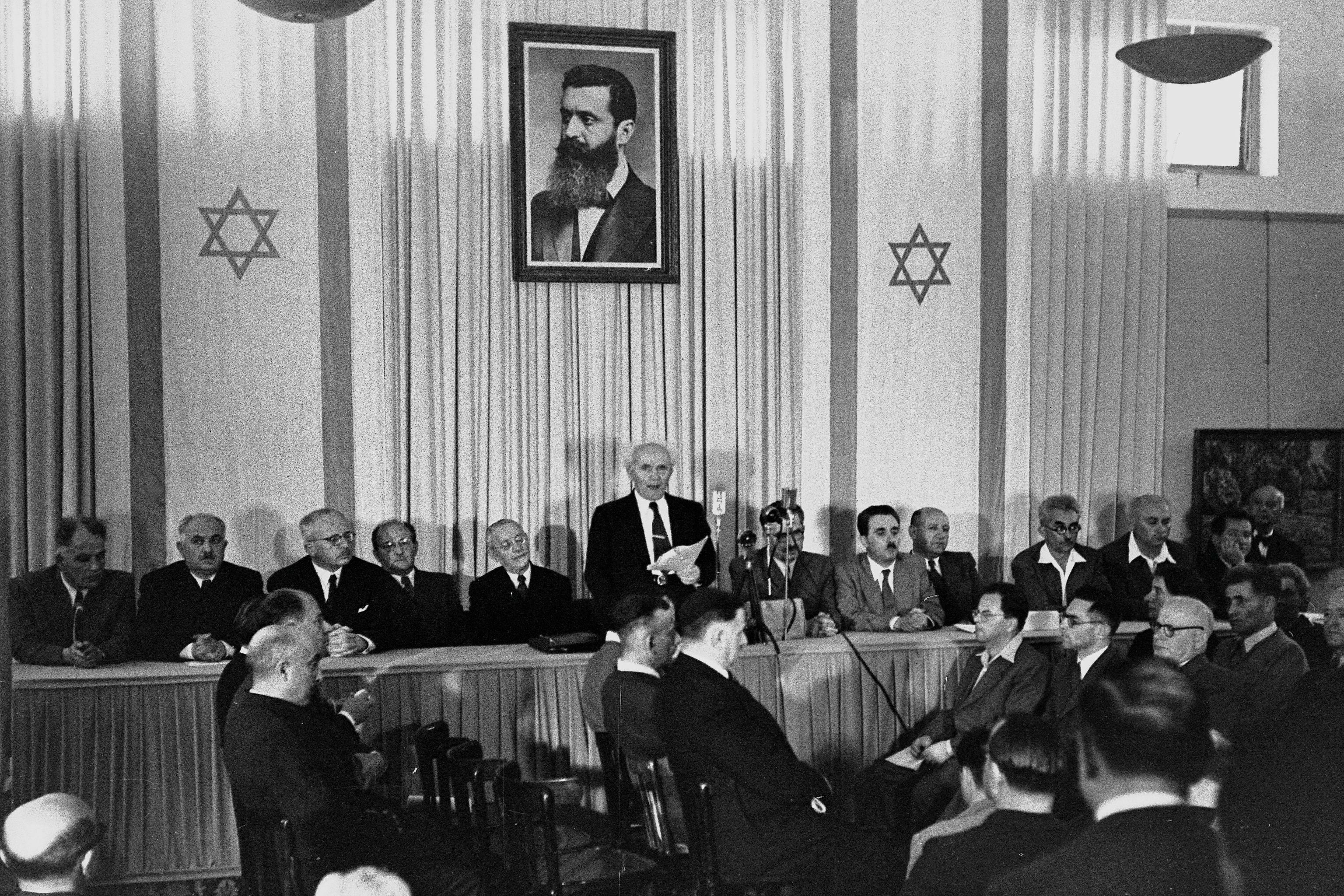
David Ben-Gurion proclaiming Israeli independence from the United Kingdom on May 14, 1948.

- 1944 – Iceland declares independence from Denmark.
- 1945 – Indonesia declares independence from the Netherlands (effective in 1949 after a bitter armed and diplomatic struggle).
- 1945 - Korea is liberated after Japan surrenders.
- 1946 – The French Mandate for Syria and the Lebanon dissolves to the independent states of Syria and Lebanon. The French settlers are forced to evacuate the French colony in Syria. The Philippines declares independence from the US.
- 1947 – The Partition of the Presidencies and provinces of British India into a secular Union of India and a predominantly Muslim Dominion of Pakistan leads to the deaths of millions.
- 1948 – British rule in Burma ends. The State of Israel is established.
- 1949 – The People's Republic of China is officially proclaimed.

=== Prominent political events ===
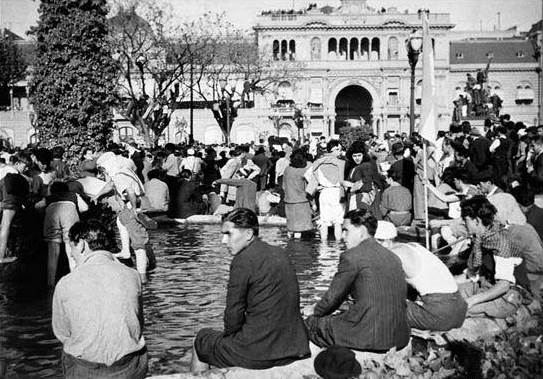
Perón's supporters in the Plaza de Mayo in Loyalty Day.

- The Revolution of '43 takes place in Argentina, ending the period known as the Infamous Decade.
- Postwar occupations of Germany and Japan from 1945.
- Workers gather in Plaza de Mayo to demand the liberation of Juan Perón in 1945. This is event is known as the Loyalty Day and is considered the foundational date of Peronism.
- The 1946 Italian institutional referendum replaces the monarchy with a republic.
- Dissolution of the League of Nations on 20 April 1946. Much of its assets were transferred to the United Nations.

== Economics ==
The Bretton Woods Conference was the gathering of 730 delegates from all 44 Allied nations at the Mount Washington Hotel, situated in Bretton Woods, New Hampshire, United States, to regulate the international monetary and financial order after the conclusion of World War II. The conference was held from July 1–22, 1944. It established the International Bank for Reconstruction and Development (IBRD) and the International Monetary Fund (IMF), and created the Bretton Woods system.

== Assassinations and attempts ==
Prominent assassinations, targeted killings, and assassination attempts include:

Date	Description
August 20, 1940	Leon Trotsky, a Russian revolutionary and Soviet politician is attacked by Ramón Mercader using an ice axe. Trotsky died the next day from exsanguination and shock.
May 27, 1942	Reinhard Heydrich, a high-ranking Nazi official who played a key role in the Holocaust, helping to develop the Final Solution, is assassinated with a converted anti-tank mine in an attack by two British-trained and equipped Czech paratroopers in Prague, dying of his wounds on June 4.
December 24, 1942	François Darlan, French Admiral and political figure, is assassinated by Fernand Bonnier de La Chapelle in Algiers, French Algeria.
April 18, 1943	In a targeted killing, Japanese admiral Isoroku Yamamoto, who oversaw the operation against Pearl Harbor, is killed when the bomber transporting him is shot down by P-38 fighters over Bougainville.
July 20, 1944	Adolf Hitler, German fascist dictator is attacked with a bomb by anti-Nazi Colonel Claus von Stauffenberg and others of the German resistance in the 20th July plot. Hitler survives with minor wounds and the suspects are either arrested or executed.
January 30, 1948	Mahatma Gandhi, Indian activist and leader of the Indian independence movement is assassinated by Nathuram Godse using a pistol.

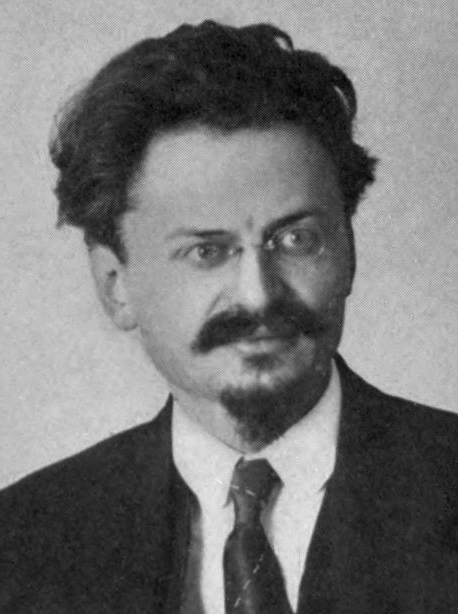
Leon Trotsky

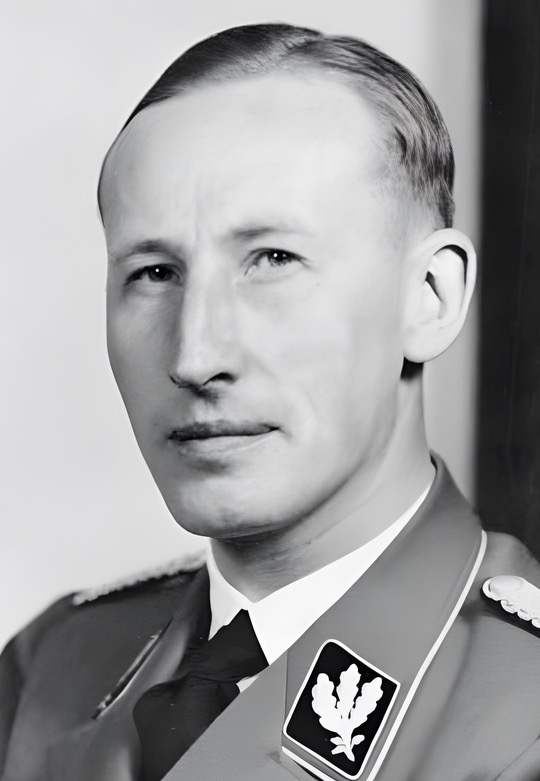
Reinhard Heydrich

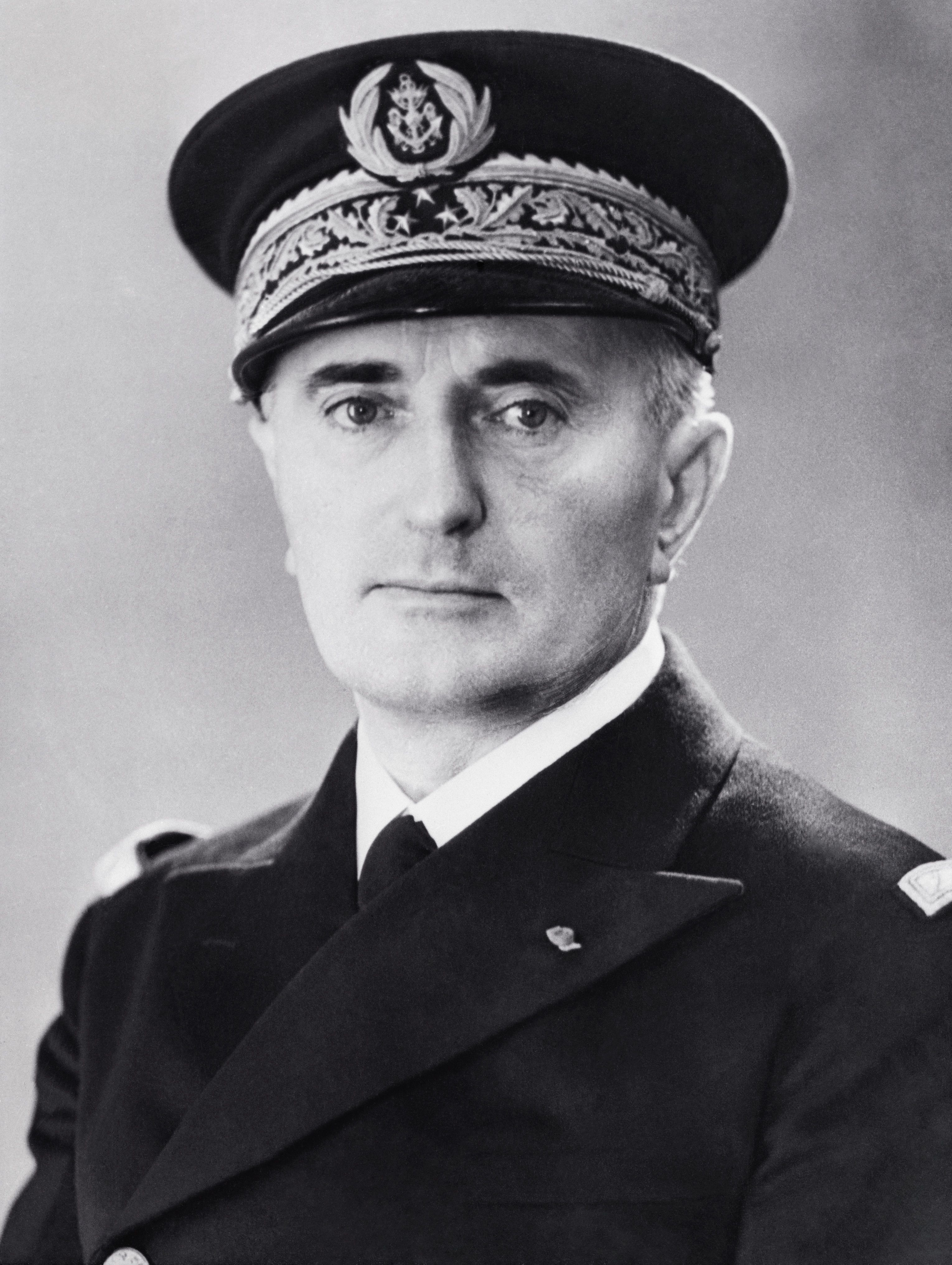
François Darlan

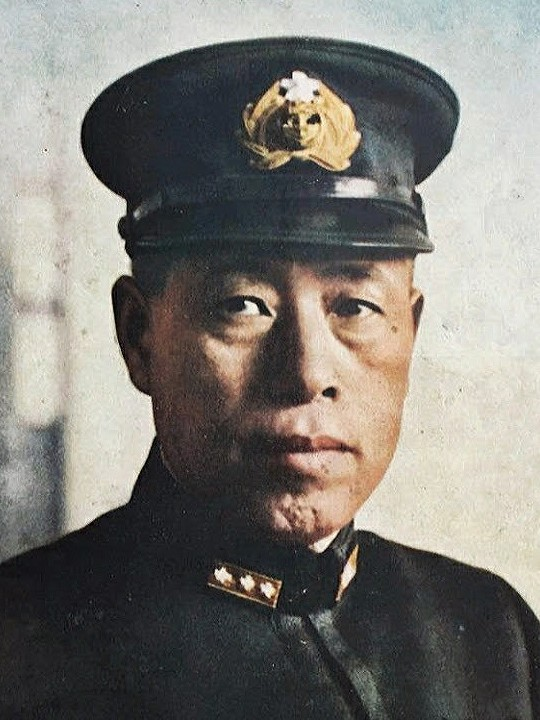
Isoroku Yamamoto

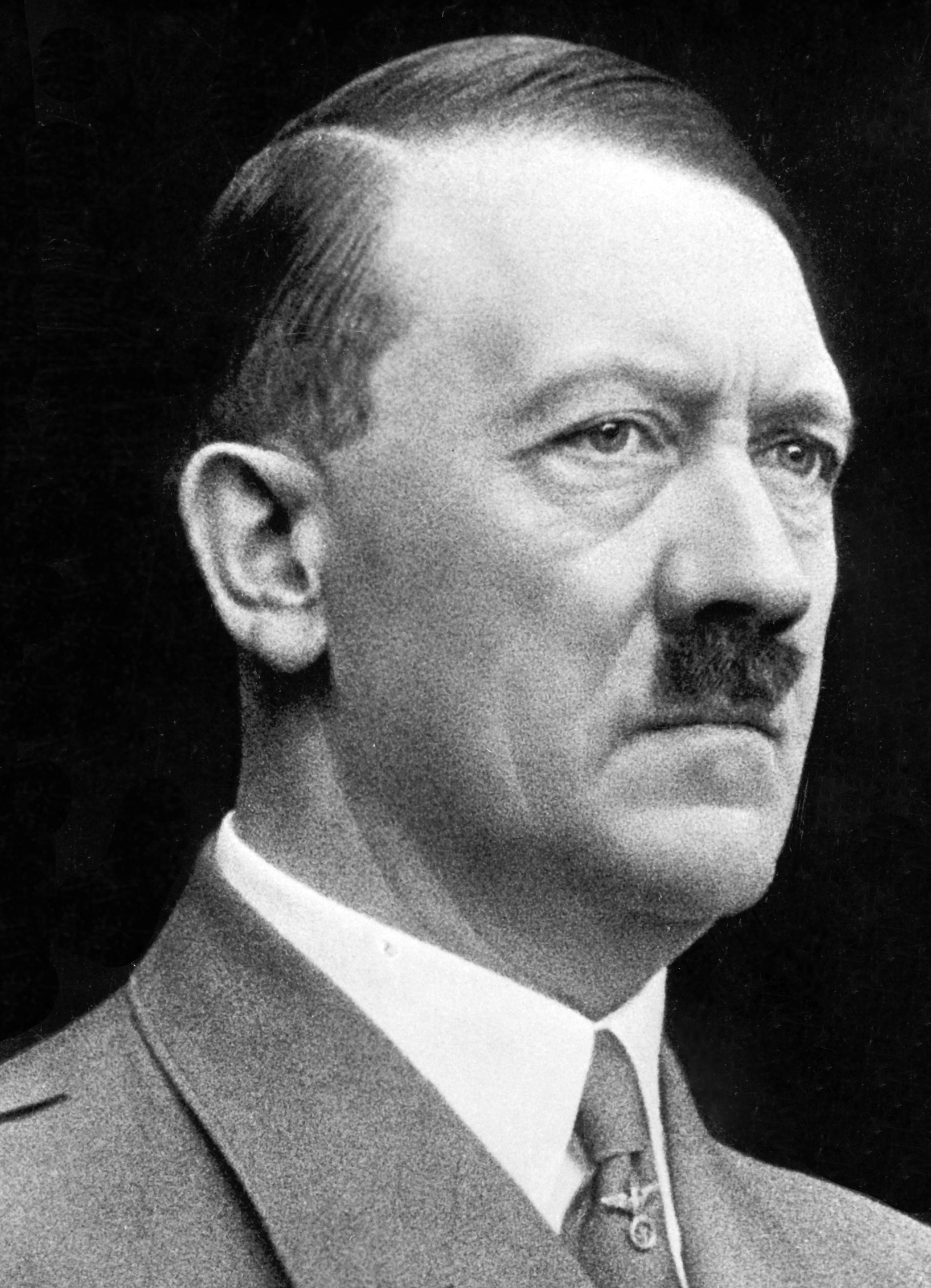
Adolf Hitler

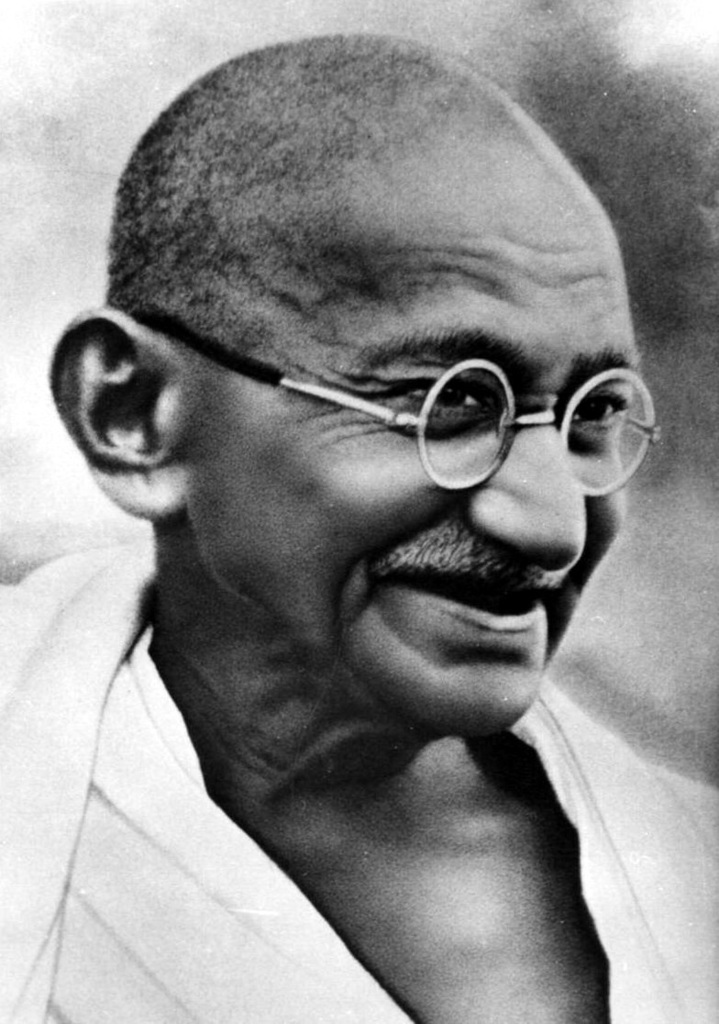
Mahatma Gandhi

== Science and technology ==
=== Technology ===
- The Atanasoff-Berry computer is now considered one of the first electronic digital computing device built by John Vincent Atanasoff and Clifford Berry at Iowa State University during 1937–1942.
- Construction in early 1941 of the Heath Robinson Bombe & the Colossus computer, which was used by British codebreakers at Bletchley Park and satellite stations nearby to read Enigma encrypted German messages during World War II. This was operational until 1946 when it was destroyed under orders from Winston Churchill. This is now widely regarded as the first operational computer which in a model rebuild still today has a remarkable computing speed.
- The Z3 as world's first working programmable, fully automatic computing machine was built.
- The first test of technology for an atomic weapon (Trinity test) as part of the Manhattan Project.
- The sound barrier was broken in October, 1947.
- The transistor was invented in December, 1947 at Bell Labs.
- The development of radar.
- The development of ballistic missiles.
- The development of jet aircraft.
- The Jeep.
- The development of commercial television.
- The Slinky.
- The microwave oven.
- The invention of Velcro.
- The invention of Tupperware.
- The invention of the Frisbee.
- The invention of hydraulic fracturing.
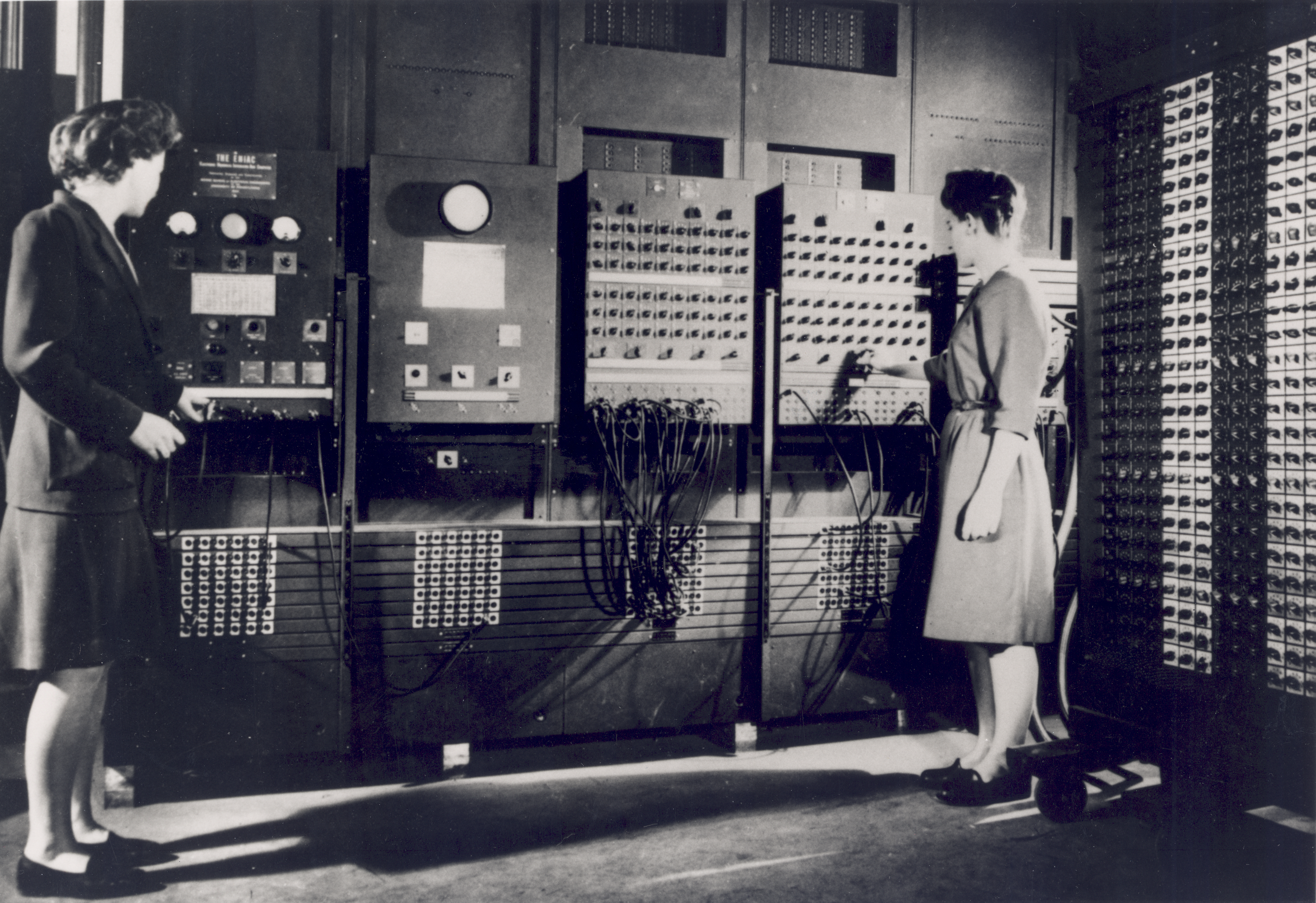
ENIAC, the first general-purpose electronic computer, operated by Betty Jennings and Frances Bilas

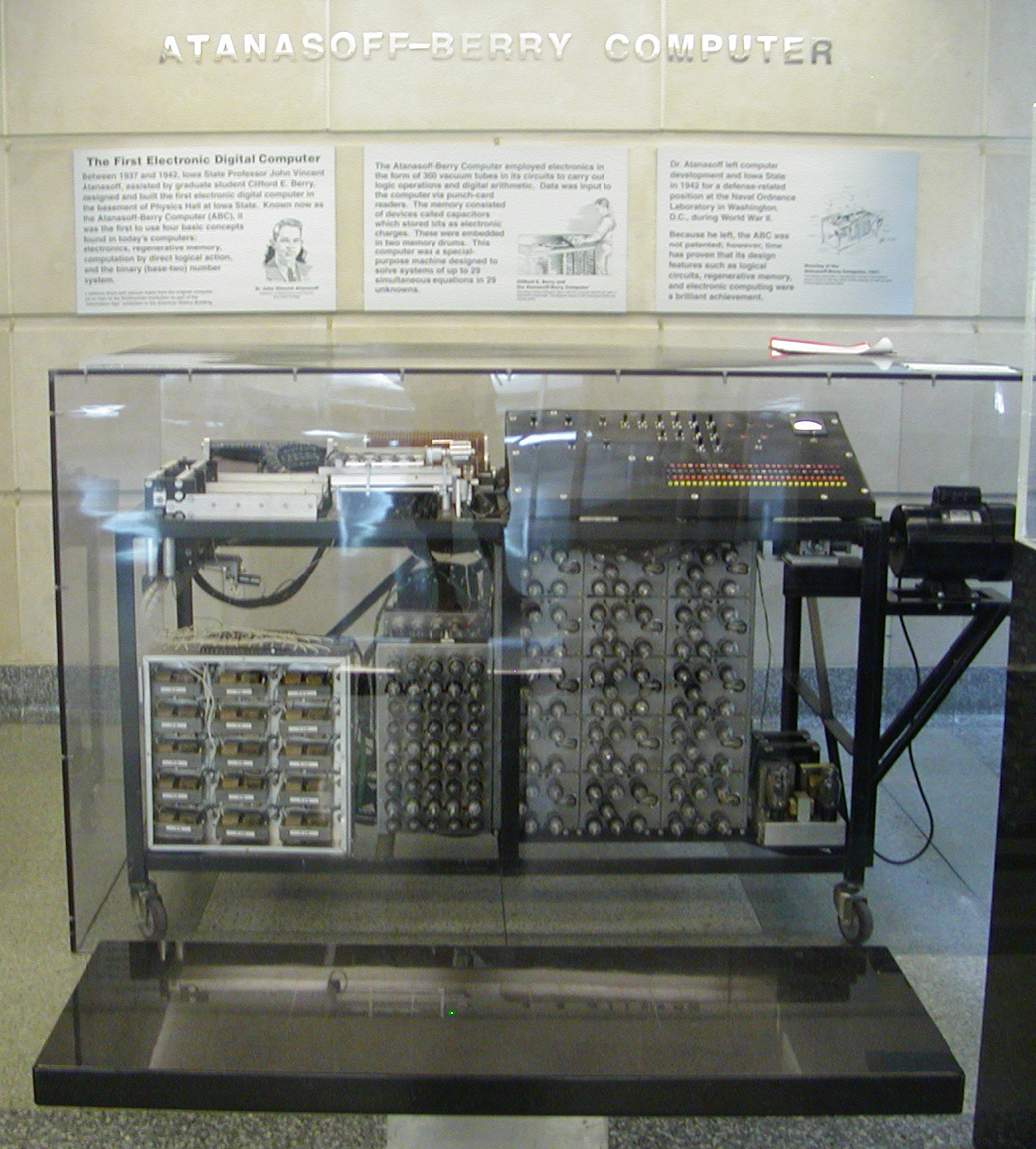
Atanasoff–Berry Computer replica at 1st floor of Durham Center, Iowa State University

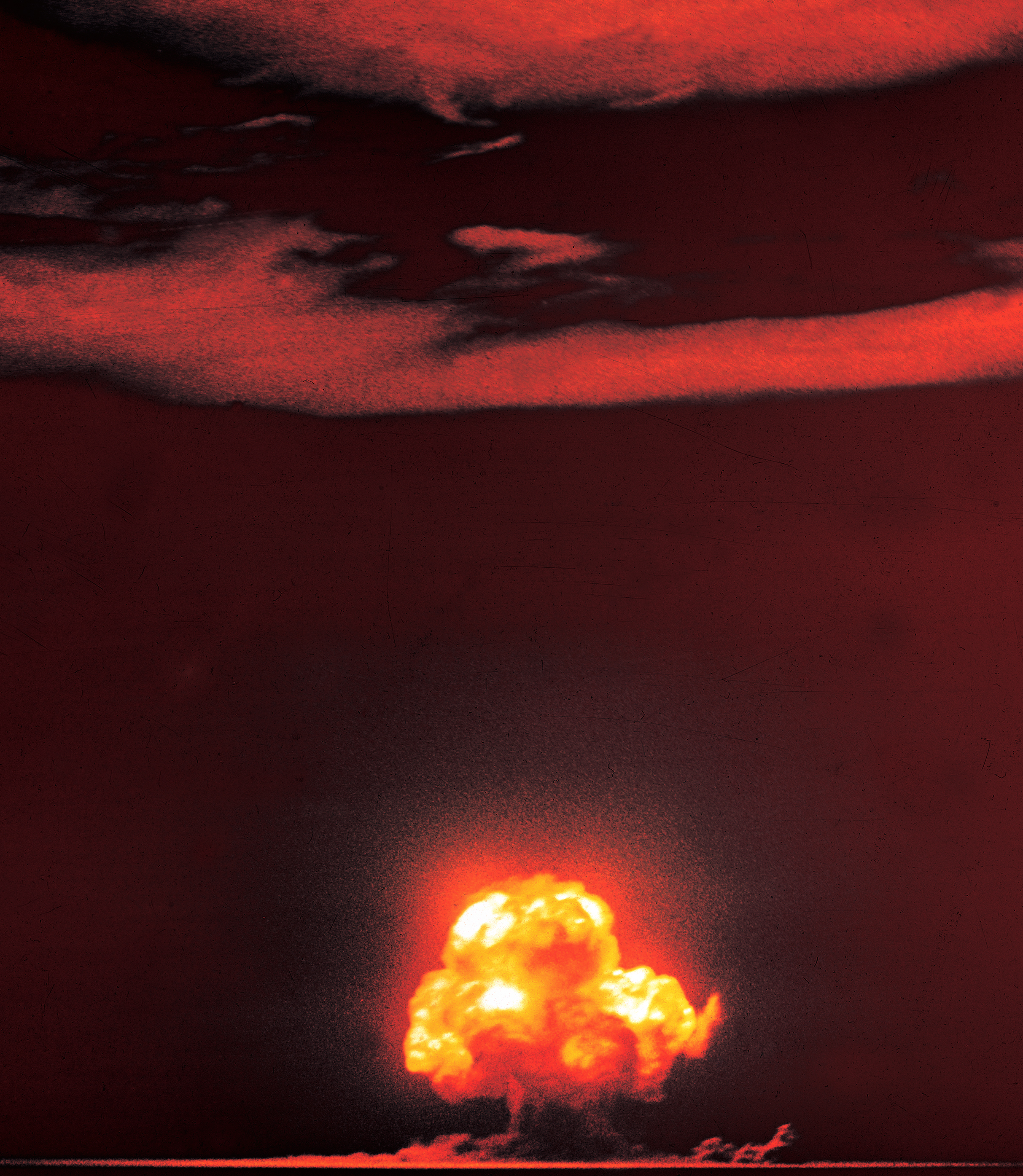
July 16, 1945 - The Manhattan Project - The atomic age begins with the Trinity nuclear test, during which the United States detonates a nuclear bomb based on plutonium at the Trinity Site in New Mexico

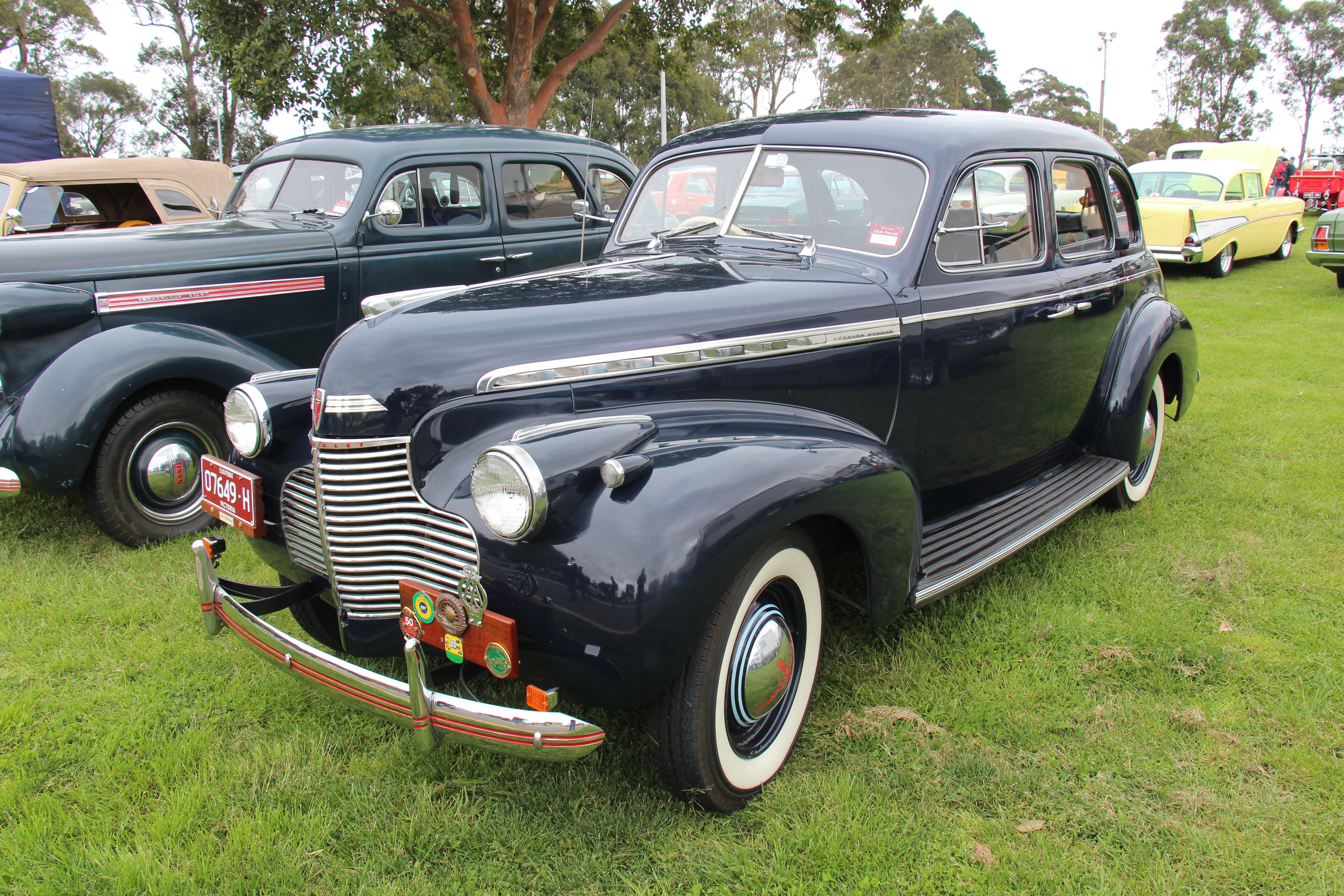
1940 Chevrolet Special Deluxe Sedan. A typical 1940s car.

=== Science ===
- Physics: the development of quantum theory and nuclear physics.
- Mathematics: the development of game theory and cryptography.
- In 1947, Thor Heyerdahl's raft Kon-Tiki crossed the Pacific Ocean from Peru to Tahiti proving the practical possibility that people from South America could have settled Polynesia in pre-Columbian times, rather than South-East Asia as it was previously believed.
- June 14, 1949, Albert II a rhesus macaque monkey, became the first mammal in space during a U.S. suborbital flight on a V-2 sounding rocket.
- Willard Libby developed radiocarbon dating—a process that revolutionized archaeology.
- The development of the modern evolutionary synthesis.
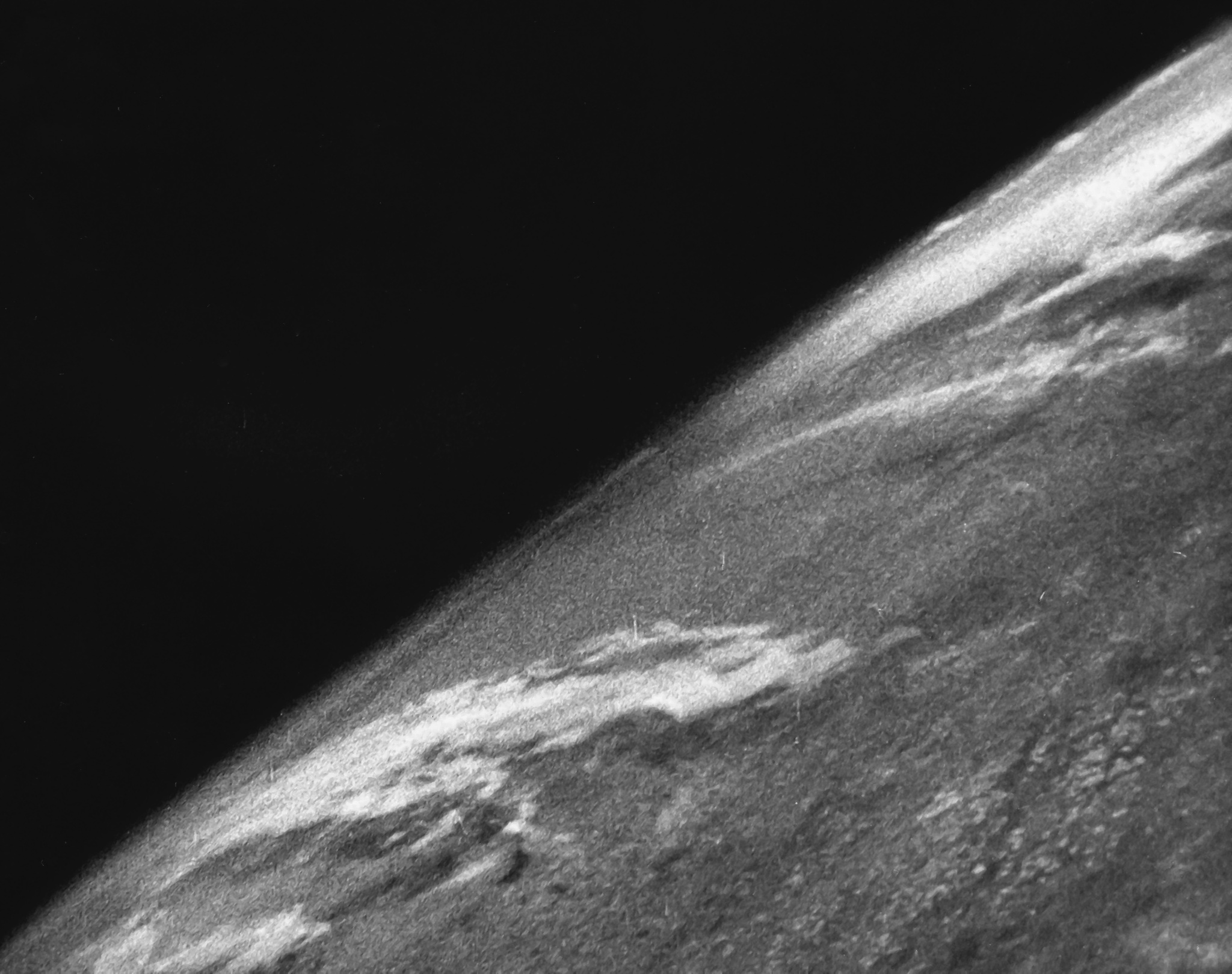
October 24, 1946: V-2 rocket takes first picture of Earth from outer space

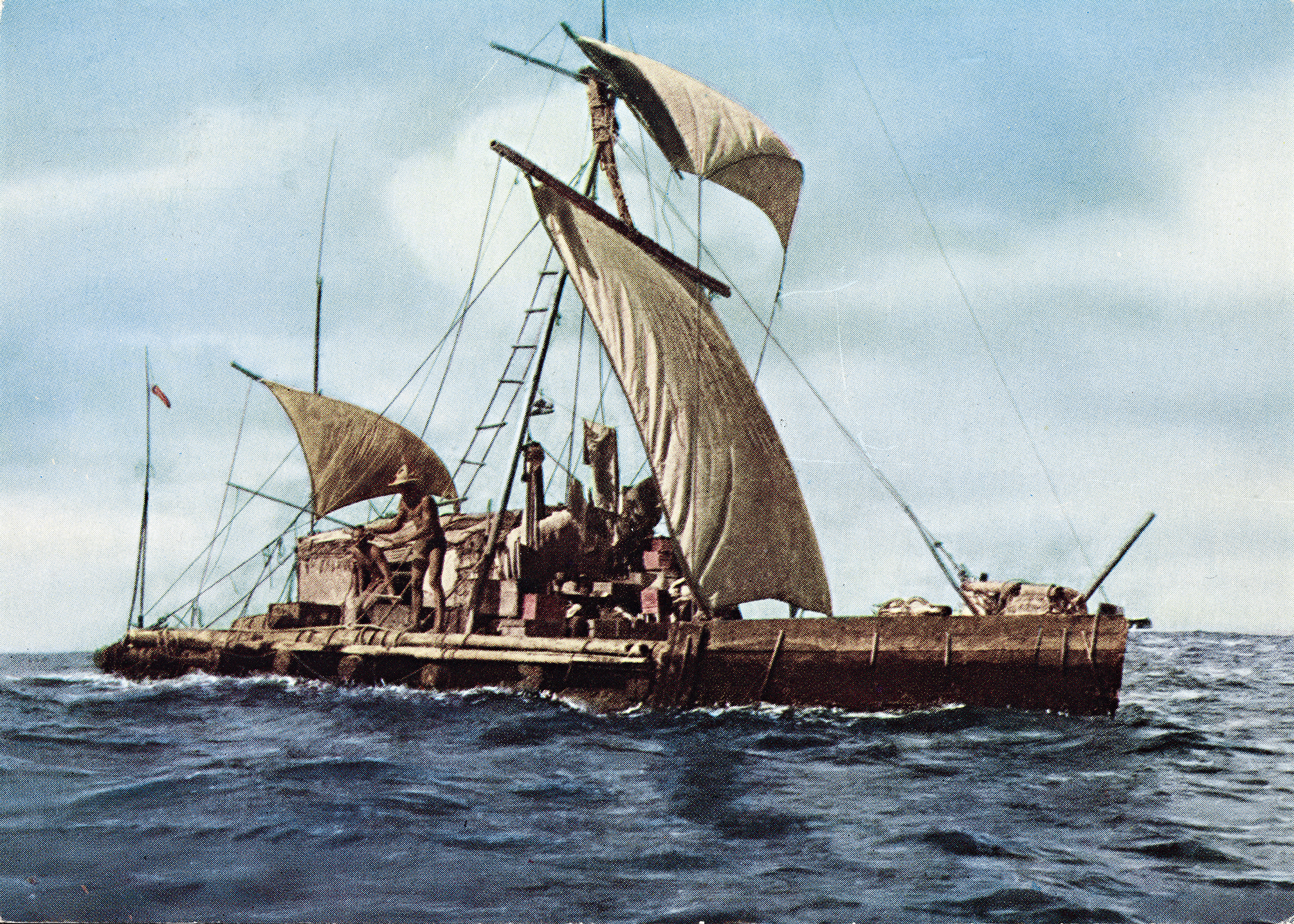
Thor Heyerdahl's raft Kon-Tiki crossed the Pacific Ocean from Peru to Tahiti proving the practical possibility that people from South America could have settled Polynesia in pre-Columbian times

== Popular culture ==
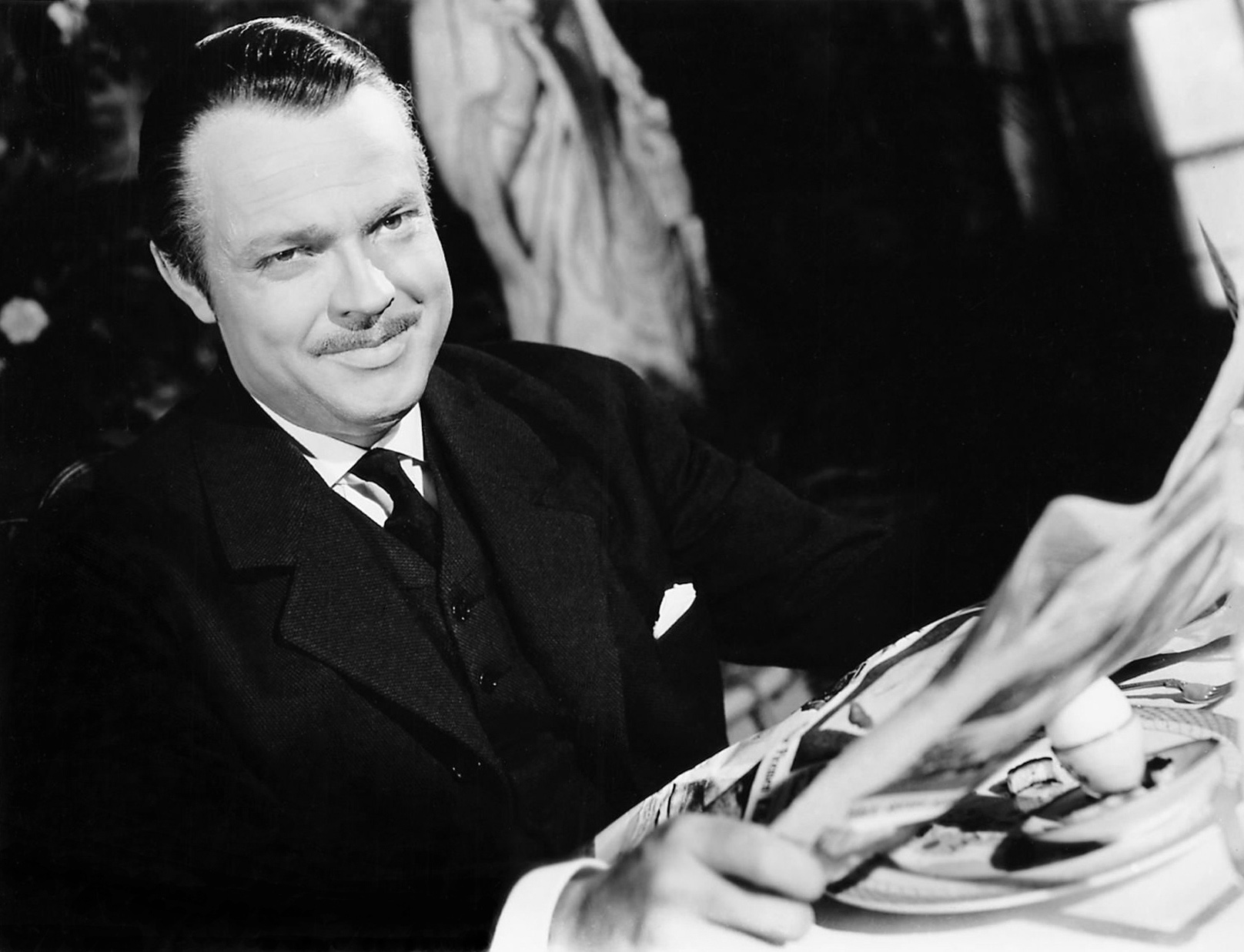
Classic Hollywood films such as Citizen Kane, Casablanca, The Grapes of Wrath, The Best Years of Our Lives, The Treasure of the Sierra Madre, and It's a Wonderful Life became enduring cinematic classics of the decade.

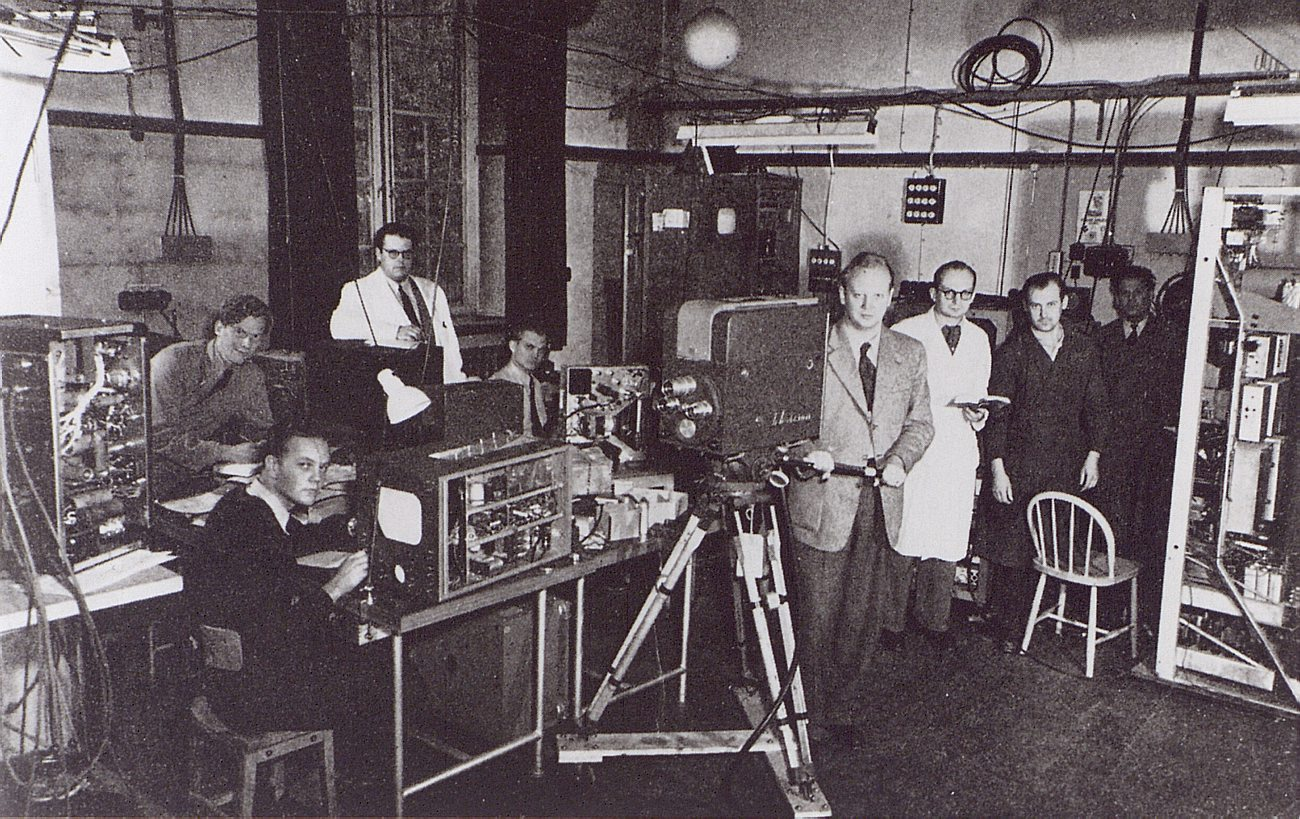
Television began entering American homes in the late 1940s, with programs such as Kraft Television Theatre, Texaco Star Theatre, and Toast of the Town helping lay the foundation for the medium’s postwar expansion.

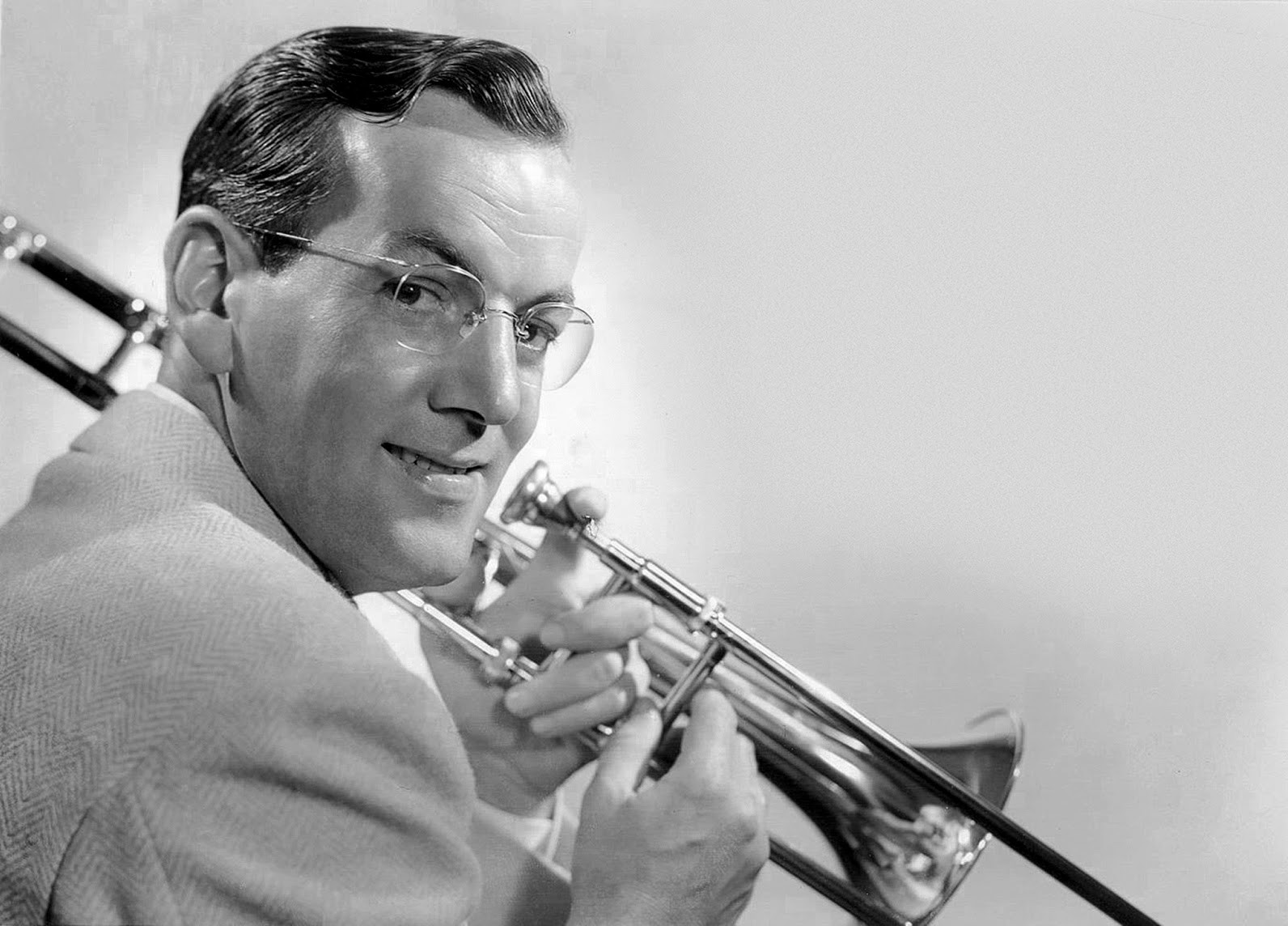
The 1940s marked the golden age of big band and swing music, led by figures such as Glenn Miller, Benny Goodman, Duke Ellington, Count Basie, and Tommy Dorsey.

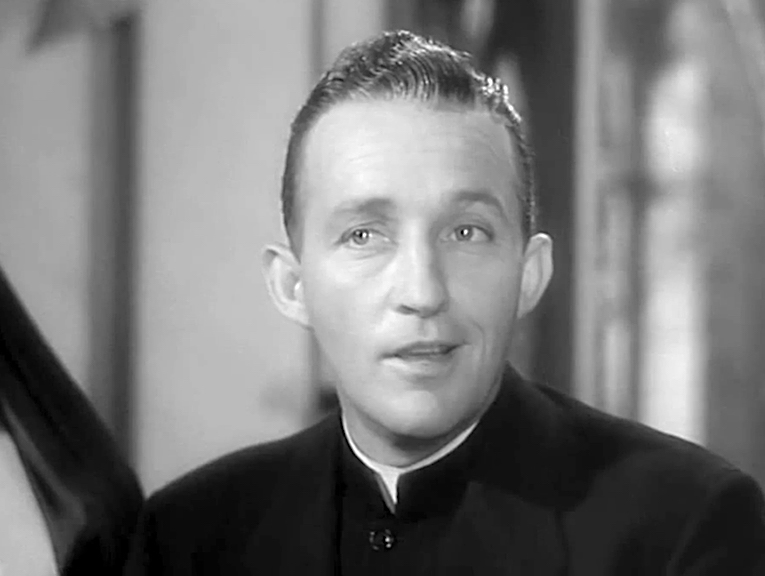
The decade also saw the rise of popular crooners and vocalists, including Bing Crosby, Frank Sinatra, Nat King Cole, Perry Como, Doris Day, and Dick Haymes.

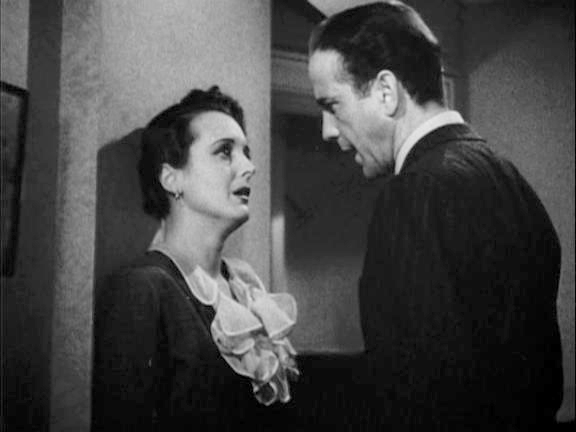
Film noir emerged as one of the decade's defining cinematic styles, reflecting wartime and postwar anxieties in films such as The Maltese Falcon, Double Indemnity, Laura, The Big Sleep, Out of the Past, and The Third Man.

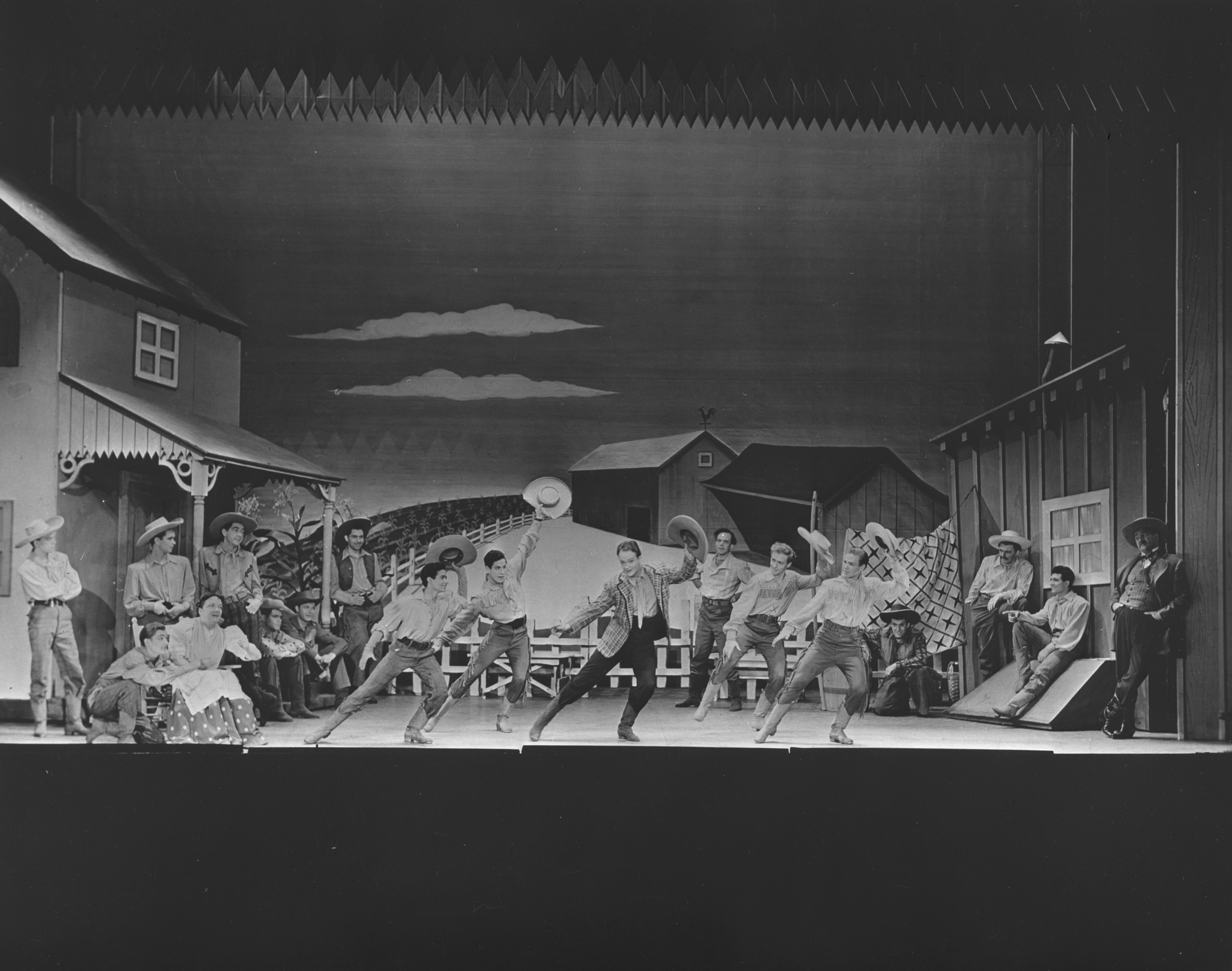
Broadway musicals became a defining feature of the decade, with Oklahoma!, South Pacific, Annie Get Your Gun, and Carousel achieving lasting popularity.

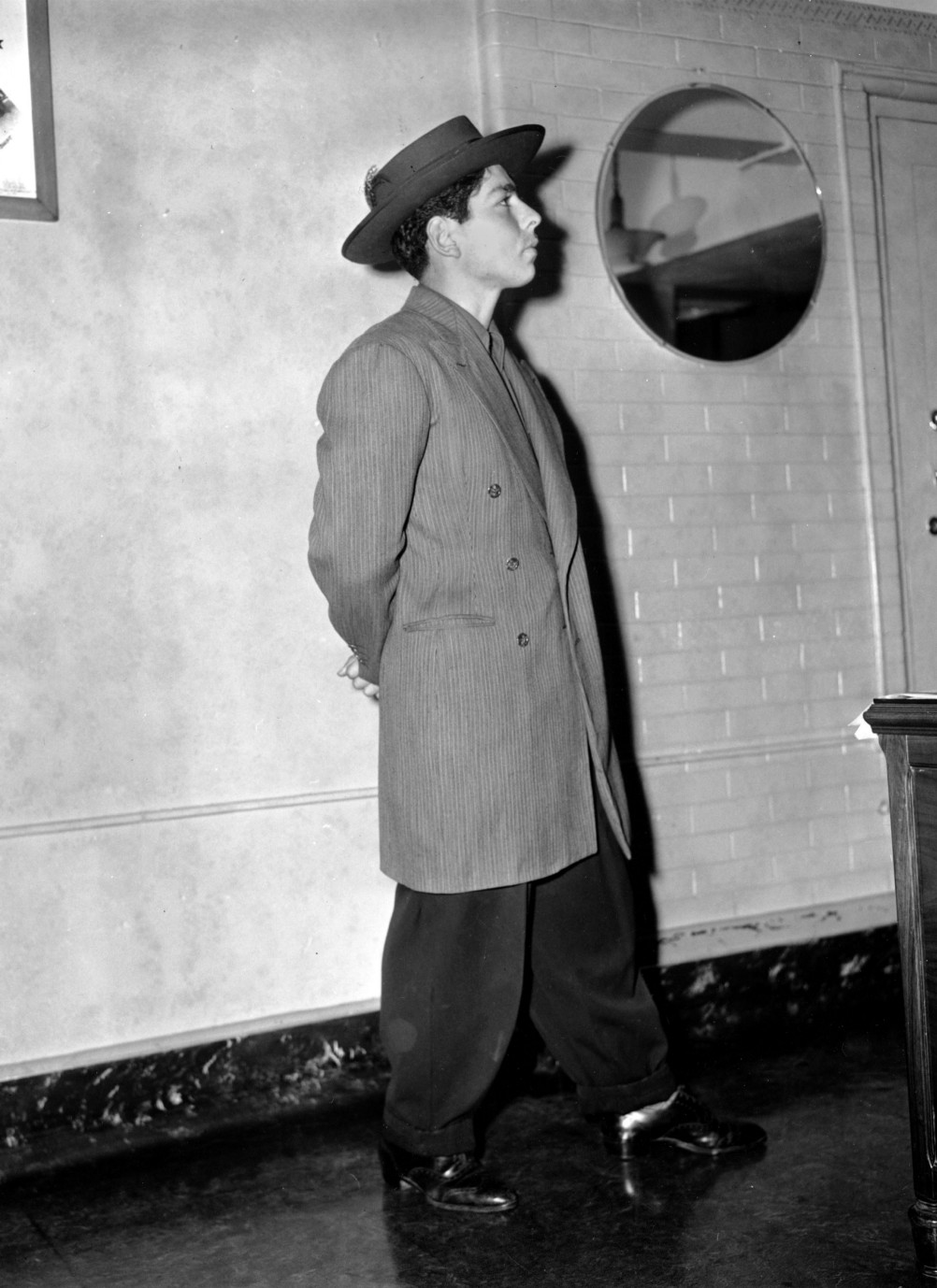
Zoot suits became fashionable among some young men, particularly within Latino, African American, and jazz subcultures; their popularity contributed to social tensions that culminated in the Zoot Suit Riots in Los Angeles.

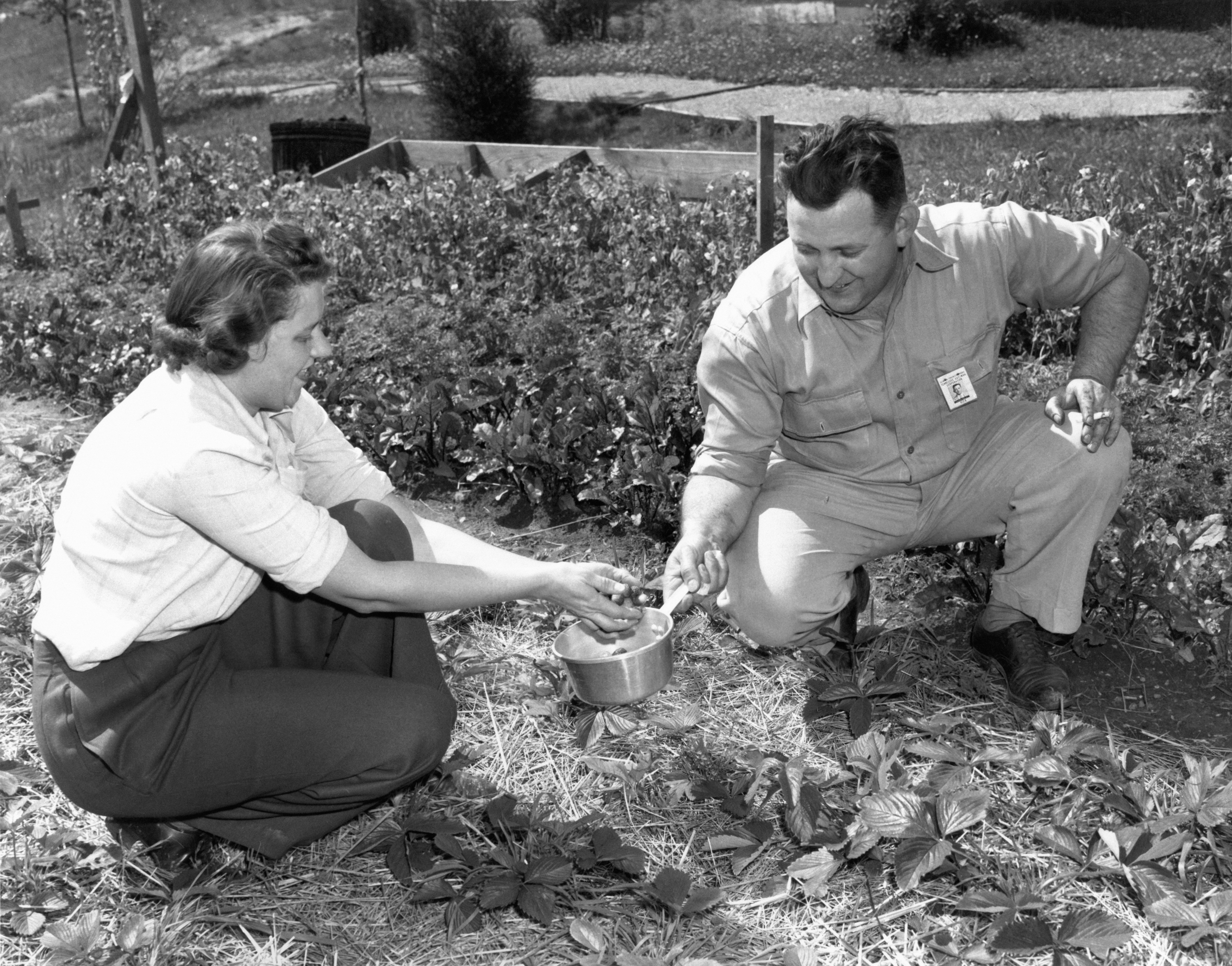
Victory gardens were widely cultivated by civilians to support the war effort by growing their own food, reflecting the era’s patriotism and community spirit.

The 1940s saw a surge in the popularity of cartoon shorts, with series such as Tom and Jerry, Looney Tunes, Merrie Melodies, Woody Woodpecker, and Donald Duck helping define the Golden Age of American animation.

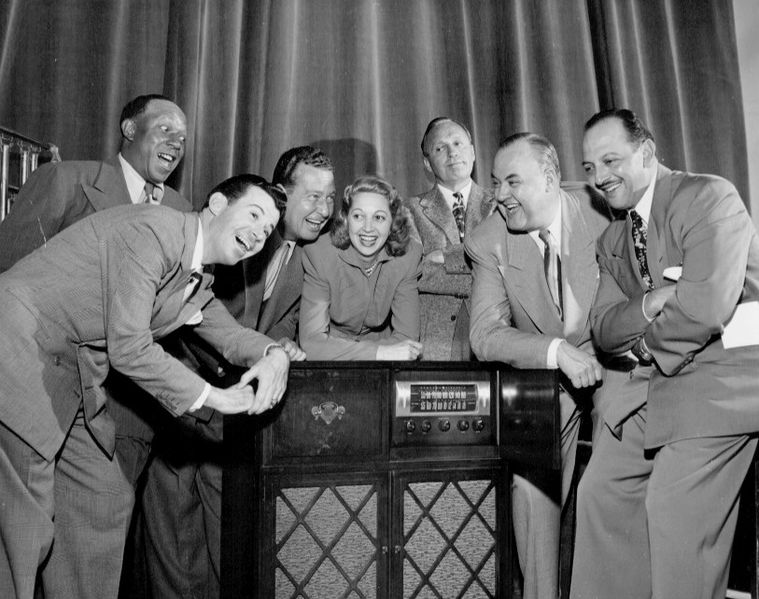
Radio programs such as The Jack Benny Program, The Lone Ranger, The Shadow, Fibber McGee and Molly, and Suspense dominated American entertainment and became iconic examples of the Golden Age of Radio.

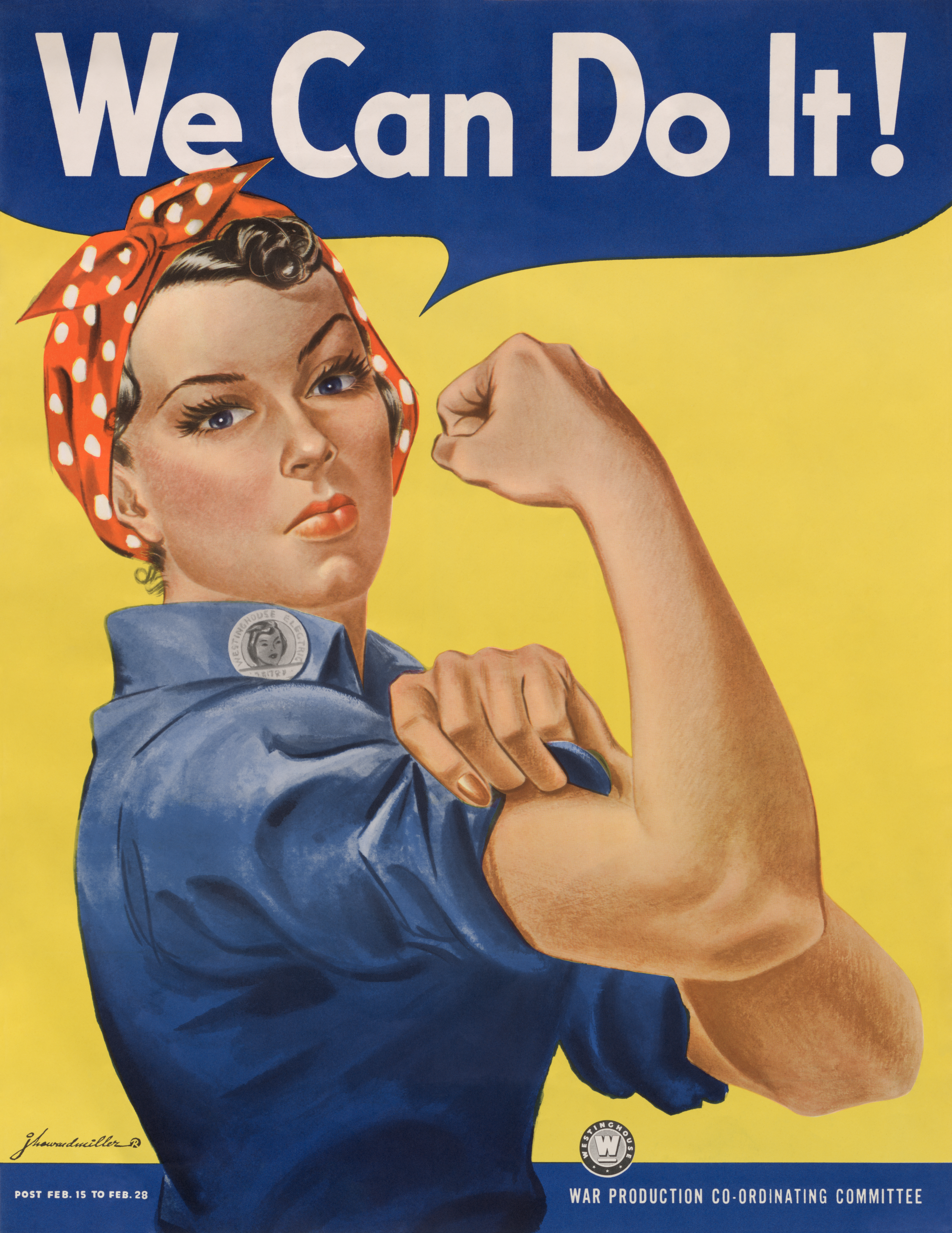
World War II propaganda posters and patriotic imagery were central to 1940s visual culture, encouraging public support for the war effort and boosting morale on the home front.

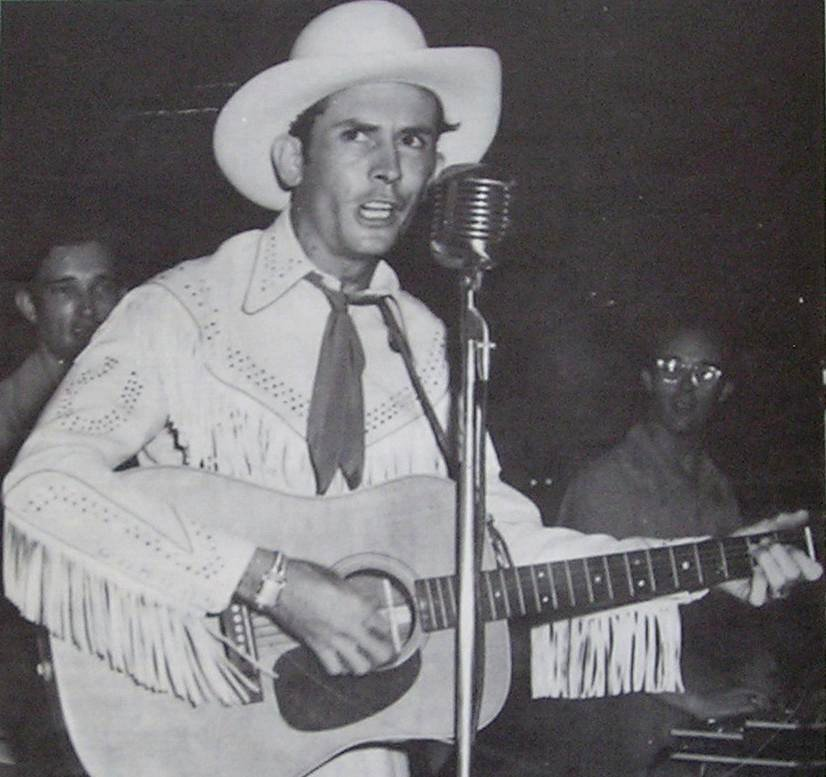
Country music expanded nationally through radio programs such as the Grand Ole Opry, with performers including Hank Williams, Gene Autry, Roy Acuff, and Ernest Tubb achieving widespread popularity.

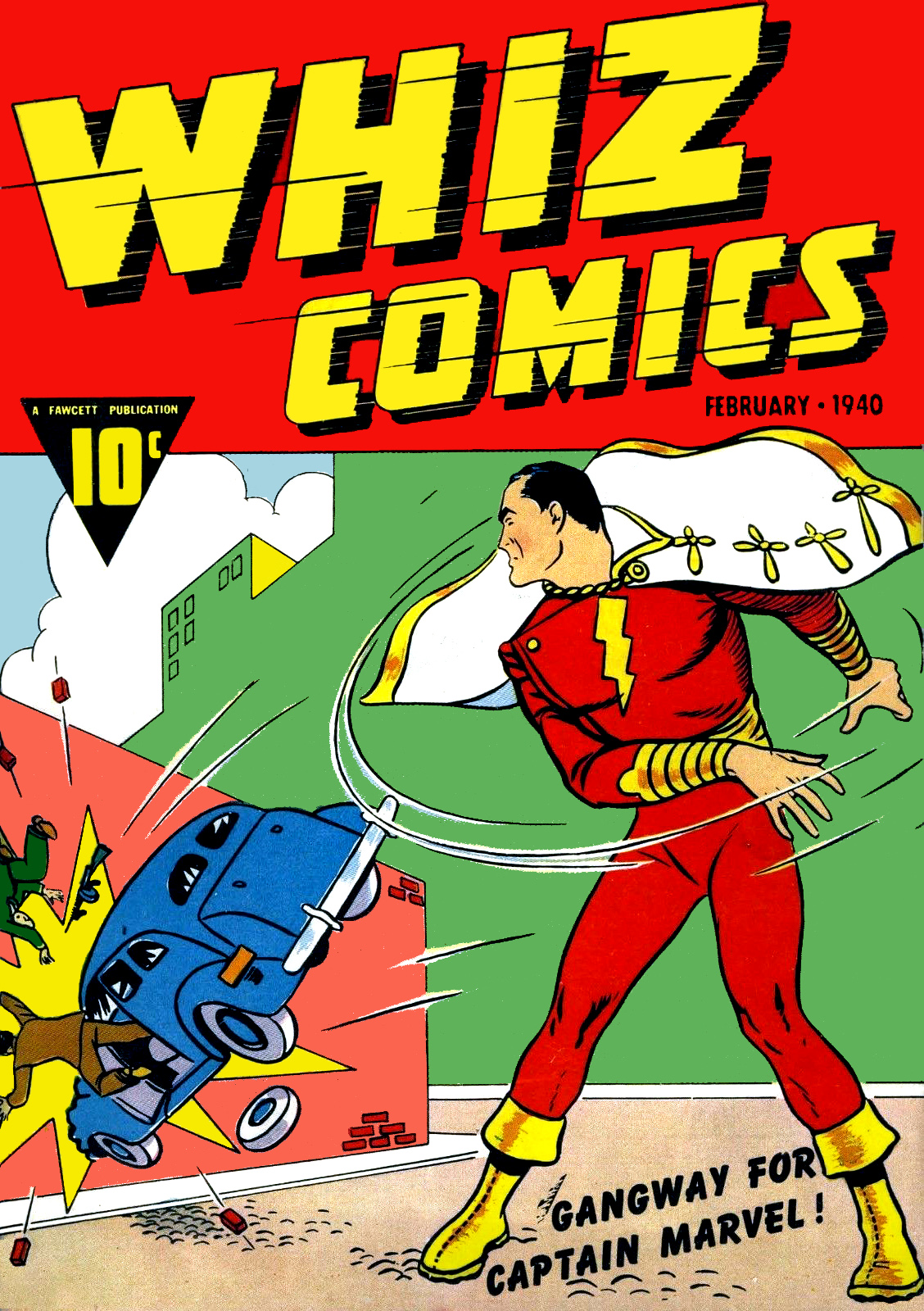
The 1940s are often regarded as the Golden Age of Comic Books, during which superheroes such as Superman, Batman, Captain America, Captain Marvel, and Wonder Woman gained immense popularity and provided wartime escapism.

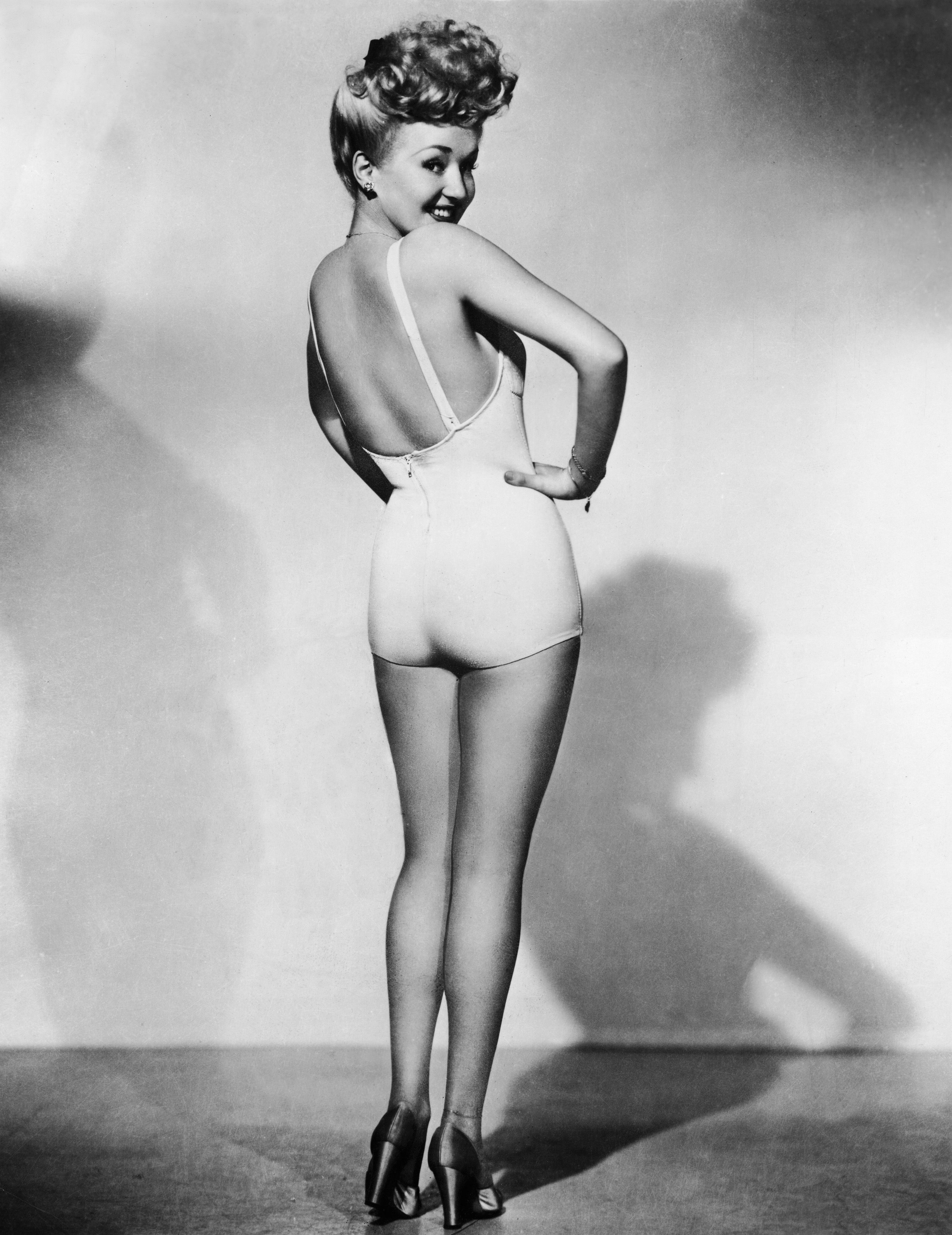
Pin-up models became cultural icons, with images of figures such as Betty Grable and Rita Hayworth widely circulated to boost morale among American troops during World War II.

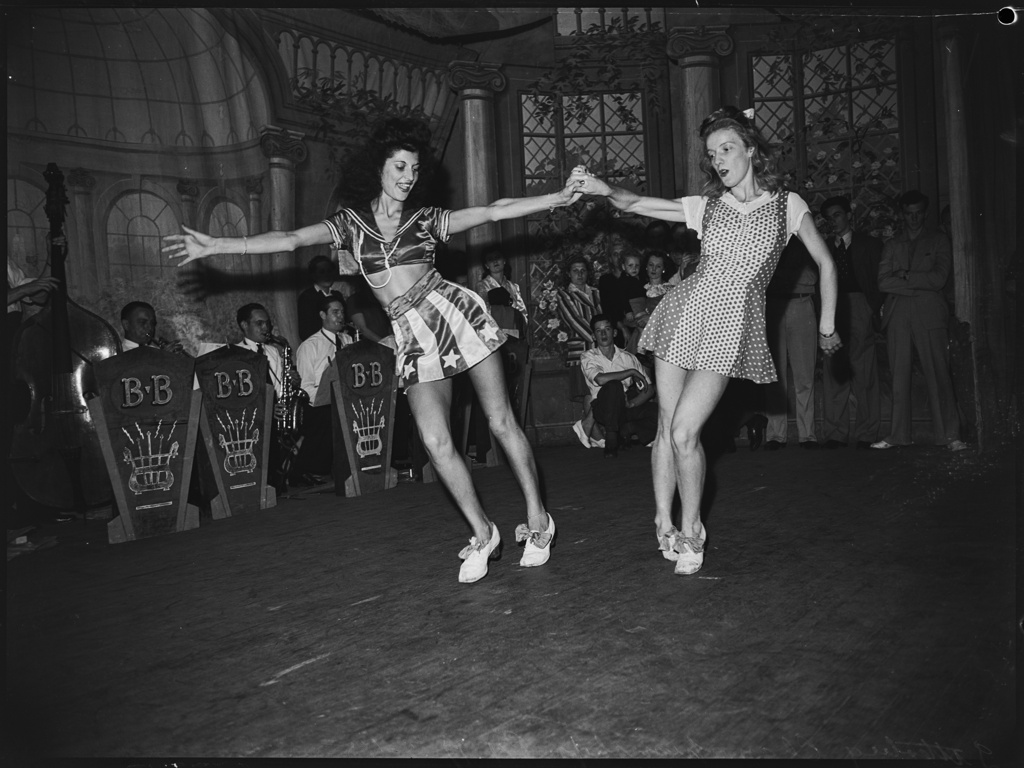
Popular dance styles of the 1940s included energetic swing dances such as the Jitterbug, Lindy Hop, and Jive, which were widely performed in ballrooms and clubs.

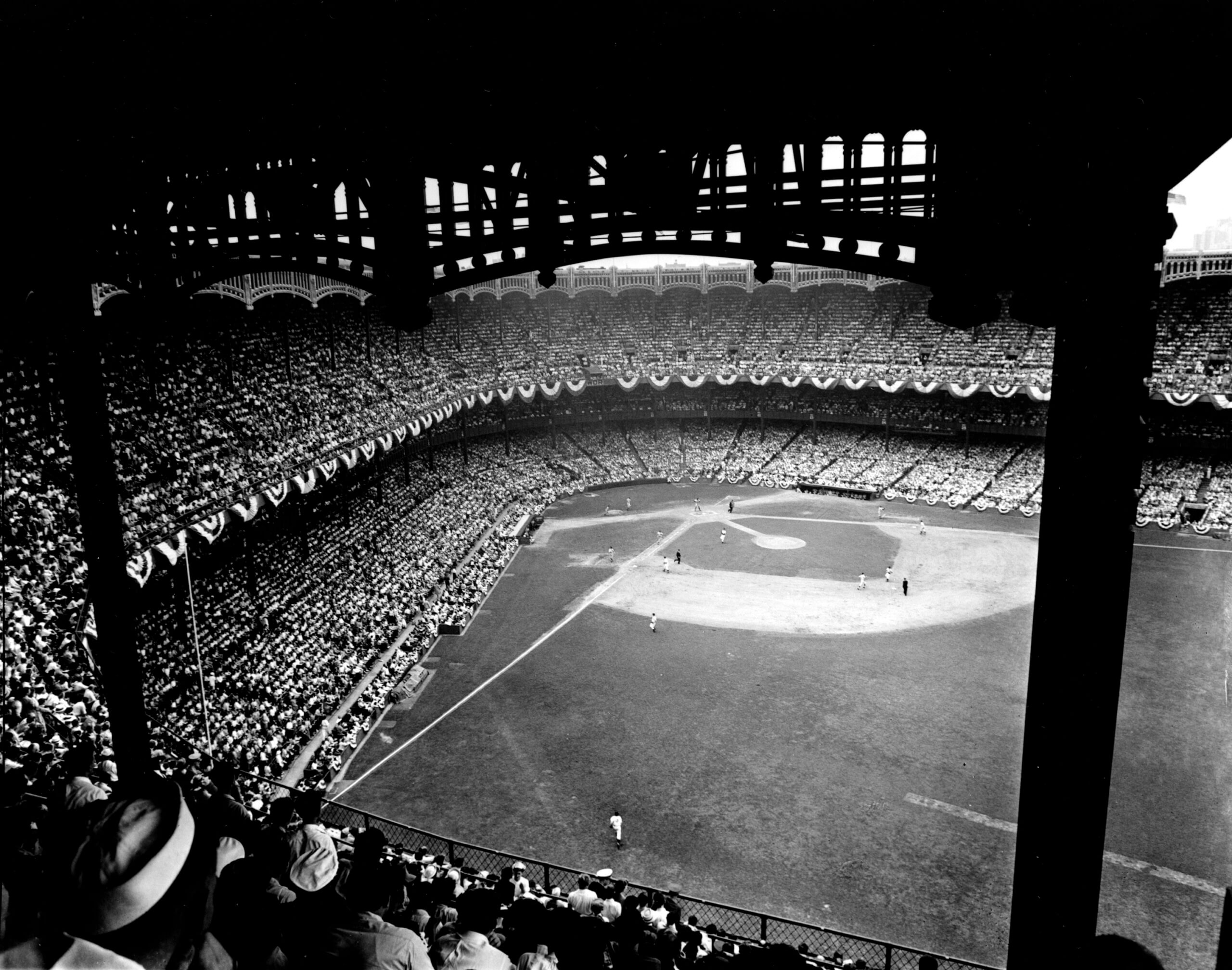
Major League Baseball remained one of the most popular sports of the decade, with stars such as Joe DiMaggio, Ted Williams, Stan Musial, Hank Greenberg, and Jackie Robinson.

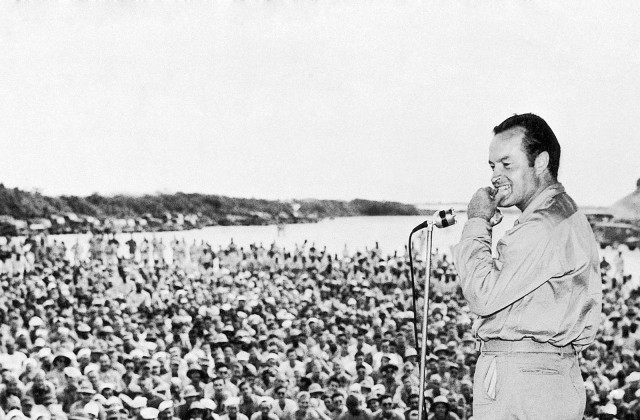
The United Service Organizations organized live entertainment for American troops, with performers such as Bob Hope traveling overseas to boost morale through comedy and music.

=== Film ===
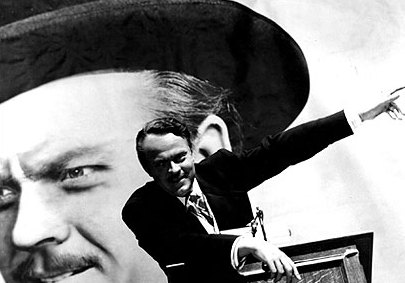
Orson Welles as Charles Foster Kane in Citizen Kane (1941)

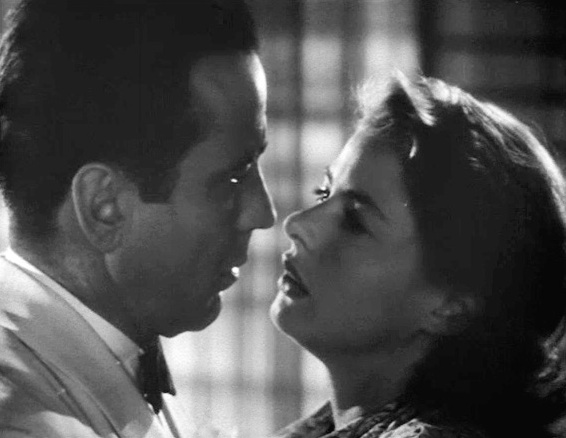
Humphrey Bogart and Ingrid Bergman as Rick Blaine and Ilsa Lund in the trailer for Casablanca (1942)

- Oscar winners: Rebecca (1940), How Green Was My Valley (1941), Mrs. Miniver (1942), Casablanca (1943), Going My Way (1944), The Lost Weekend (1945), The Best Years of Our Lives (1946), Gentleman's Agreement (1947), Hamlet (1948), All the King's Men (1949).
- Some of Hollywood's most notable films of the 1940s include: The Maltese Falcon directed by John Huston (1941), It's a Wonderful Life directed by Frank Capra (1946), Double Indemnity directed by Billy Wilder (1944), Meet Me in St. Louis directed by Vincente Minnelli (1944), Casablanca directed by Michael Curtiz (1942), Citizen Kane directed by Orson Welles (1941), The Great Dictator directed by Charlie Chaplin (1940), The Big Sleep directed by Howard Hawks (1946), The Lady Eve and Sullivan's Travels directed by Preston Sturges (1941), The Shop Around the Corner directed by Ernst Lubitsch (1940), White Heat directed by Raoul Walsh (1949), Yankee Doodle Dandy directed by Michael Curtiz (1942), and Notorious directed by Alfred Hitchcock, (1946). The Walt Disney Studios released the animated feature films Pinocchio (1940), Dumbo (1941), Fantasia (1940), and Bambi (1942).

Although the 1940s was a decade dominated by World War II, important and noteworthy films about a wide variety of subjects were made during that era. Hollywood was instrumental in producing dozens of classic films during the 1940s, several of which were about the war and some are on most lists of all-time great films. European cinema survived although obviously curtailed during wartime and yet many films of high quality were made in the United Kingdom, France, Italy, the Soviet Union and elsewhere in Europe. The cinema of Japan also survived. Akira Kurosawa and other directors managed to produce significant films during the 1940s.

Polish filmmakers in Great Britain created anti-nazi color film Calling Mr. Smith (1943) about current Nazi crimes in occupied Europe during the war and about lies of Nazi propaganda.

Film Noir, a film style that incorporated crime dramas with dark images, became largely prevalent during the decade. Films such as The Maltese Falcon and The Big Sleep are considered classics and helped launch the careers of legendary actors such as Humphrey Bogart and Ava Gardner. The genre has been widely copied since its initial inception.

In France during the war the tour de force Children of Paradise directed by Marcel Carné (1945), was shot in Nazi occupied Paris. Memorable films from post-war England include David Lean's Great Expectations (1946) and Oliver Twist (1948), Carol Reed's Odd Man Out (1947) and The Third Man (1949), and Powell and Pressburger's A Matter of Life and Death (1946), Black Narcissus (1946) and The Red Shoes (1948), Laurence Olivier's Hamlet, the first non-American film to win the Academy Award for Best Picture and Kind Hearts and Coronets (1949) directed by Robert Hamer. Italian neorealism of the 1940s produced poignant movies made in post-war Italy. Roma, città aperta directed by Roberto Rossellini (1945), Sciuscià directed by Vittorio De Sica (1946), Paisà directed by Roberto Rossellini (1946), La terra trema directed by Luchino Visconti (1948), Bicycle Thieves directed by Vittorio De Sica (1948), and Bitter Rice directed by Giuseppe De Santis (1949), are some well-known examples.

In Japanese cinema, The 47 Ronin is a 1941 black and white two-part Japanese film directed by Kenji Mizoguchi. The Men Who Tread on the Tiger's Tail (1945), and the post-war Drunken Angel (1948), and Stray Dog (1949), directed by Akira Kurosawa are considered important early works leading to his first masterpieces of the 1950s. Drunken Angel (1948), marked the beginning of the successful collaboration between Kurosawa and actor Toshiro Mifune that lasted until 1965.

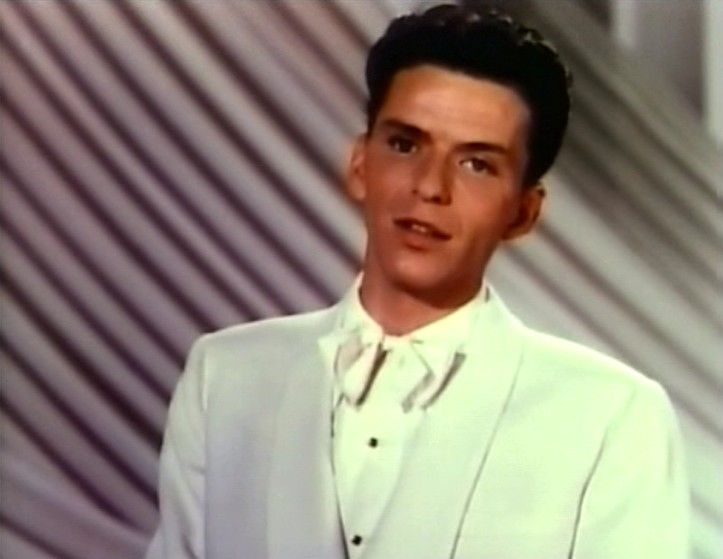
Frank Sinatra gained massive popularity during the decade, becoming one of the first teen idols, and one of the pop artists who sold the most records in the 1940s

=== Music ===
- Bing Crosby was the bestselling pop artist of the 1940s. Crosby was the leading figure of the crooner sound as well as its most iconic, defining artist. By the 1940s, he was an entertainment superstar who mastered all of the major media formats of the day, movies, radio, and recorded music.
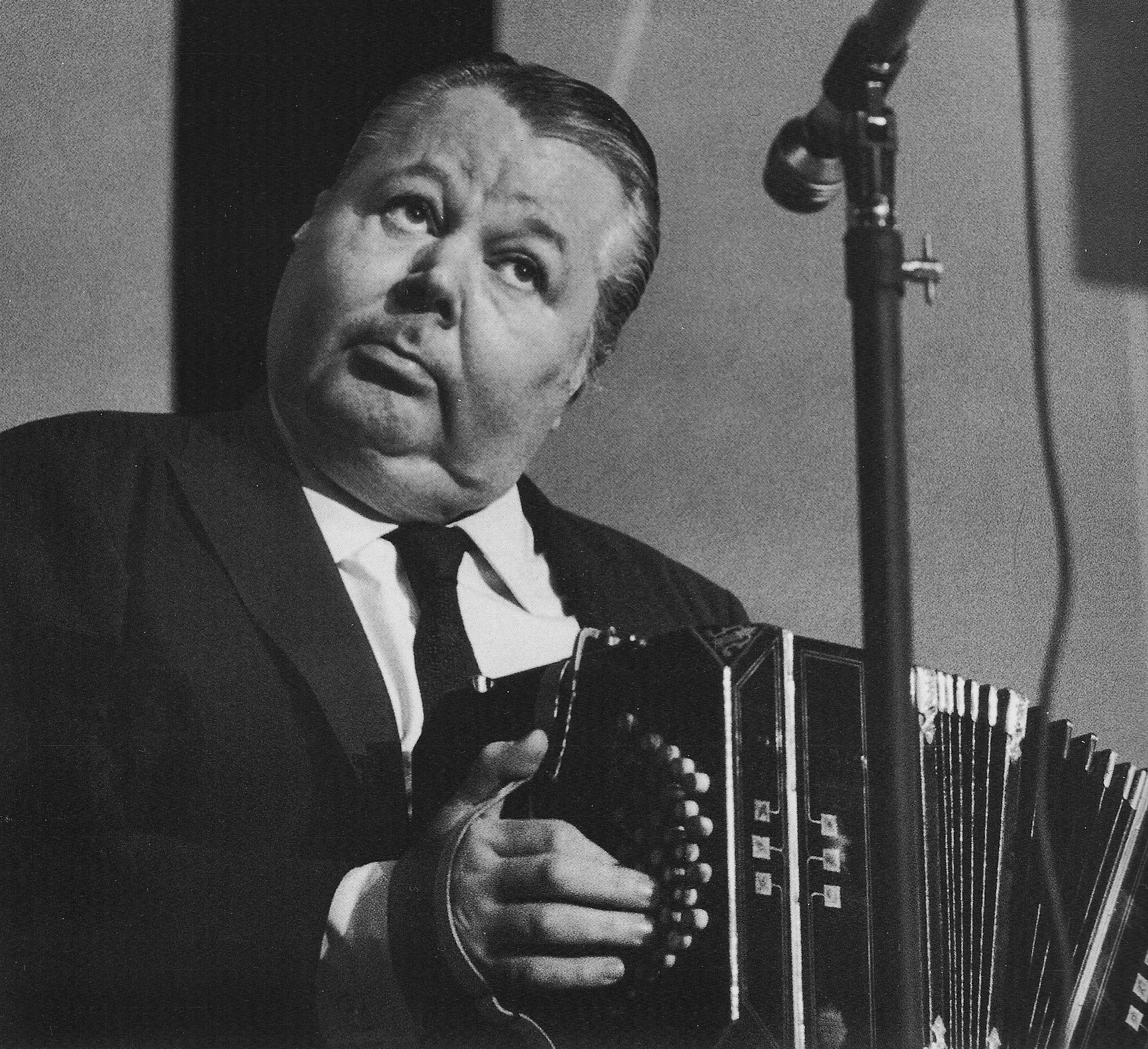
  Aníbal Troilo, one of the most famous Bandoneon players in the Golden Age of Tango
- The most popular music style during the 1940s was swing, which prevailed during World War II. In the later periods of the 1940s, less swing was prominent and crooners like Frank Sinatra, along with genres such as bebop and the earliest traces of rock and roll, were the prevalent genre.
- Tango remained popular worldwide and several of the most famous tangos were composed in this decade, such as Malena, Garúa, Nada, Naranjo en flor, and many others.

=== Literature ===
- For Whom the Bell Tolls by Ernest Hemingway in 1940.
- The Myth of Sisyphus by Albert Camus in 1942.
- The Stranger by Albert Camus in 1942.
- The Little Prince by Antoine de Saint-Exupéry in 1943.
- Anti-Semite and Jew by Jean-Paul Sartre in 1943.
- The Fountainhead by Ayn Rand in 1943.
- Ficciones by Jorge Luis Borges in 1944.
- No Exit by Jean-Paul Sartre in 1944.
- Pippi Longstocking by Astrid Lindgren in 1945.
- The Diary of Anne Frank by Anne Frank in 1947.
- Death of a Salesman by Arthur Miller in 1949.
- Nineteen Eighty-Four by George Orwell in 1949.
- The Glass Menagerie by Tennessee Williams in 1944.
- The Aleph by Jorge Luis Borges in 1949.

=== Fashion ===
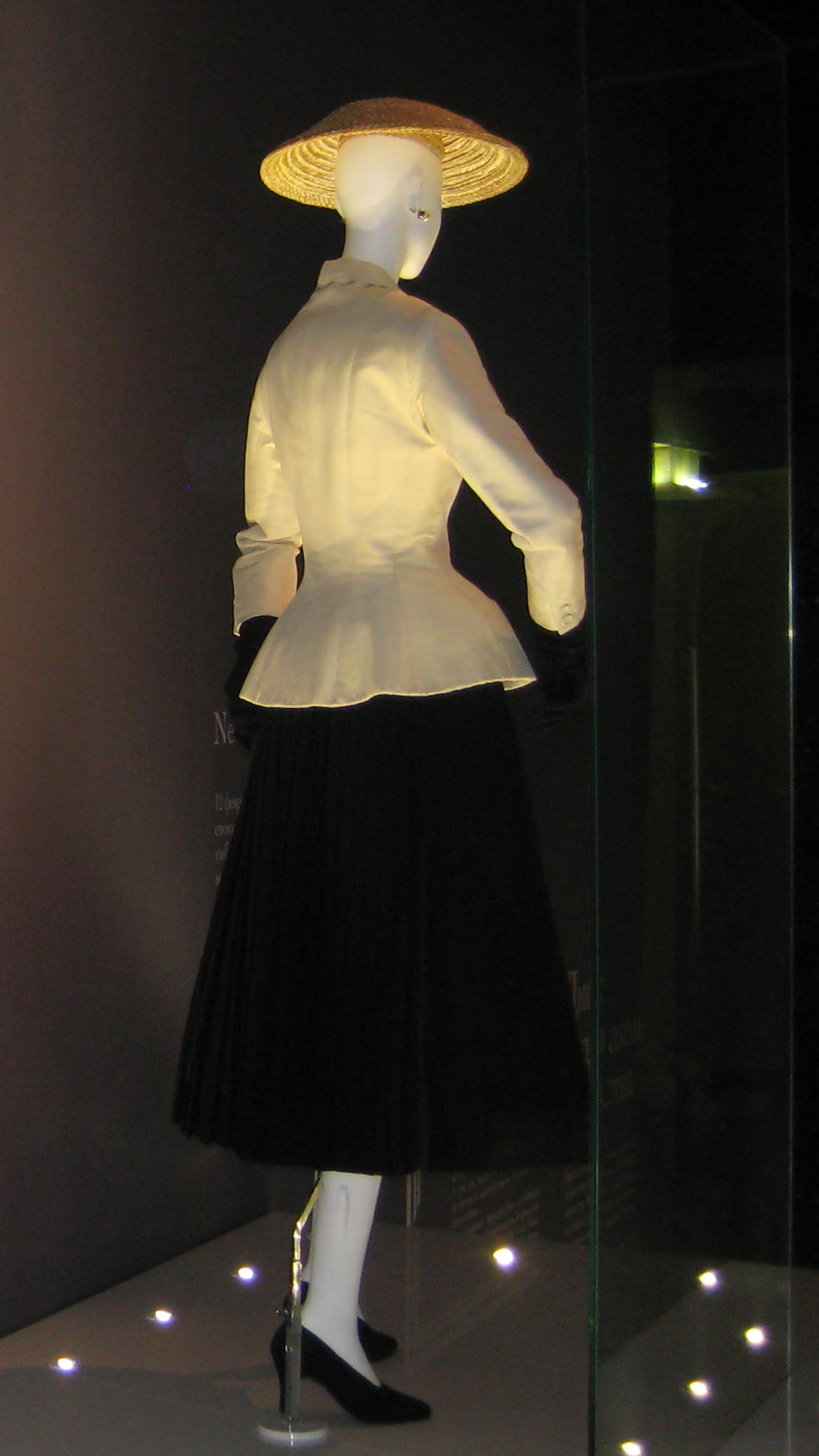
An ensemble from Dior's "New Look" collection, 1947.

The fashion of the 1940s was defined above all by World War II, which divided the decade into two sharply distinct phases. During the wartime years, scarce resources and government rationing programs transformed clothing across the Allied nations: in Britain, the Utility Clothing Scheme and Austerity directives restricted fabrics, seams, pockets, and embellishments; in the United States, General Limitation Order L-85 capped jacket lengths and banned French cuffs and wool evening dresses; and in France, nearly 100 couture salons remained open under German occupation, evolving in isolation from global trends. The dominant womenswear silhouette of the early 1940s featured square padded shoulders, a belted or tailored waist, and hemlines grazing the knee—a structured, mannish aesthetic born of wartime necessity. With French couture cut off from the international market after the Fall of France in 1940, American ready-to-wear seized the opportunity to forge its own identity, propelled by innovators such as Claire McCardell—whose practical yet feminine sportswear aesthetic defined an emerging "American Look"—and Norman Norell, who applied couture-level standards to ready-to-wear.

The post-war years brought an abrupt reversal. On February 12, 1947, Christian Dior unveiled his debut collection in Paris, instantly dubbed the "New Look" by Harper's Bazaar editor Carmel Snow: softer shoulders, a cinched waist, emphasized hips, and dramatically longer and fuller skirts that represented the very antithesis of wartime austerity. As fashion historian James Laver observed, the New Look "was in fact not new at all, but simply an exaggeration of late 1930s and Occupation styles, yet it was the very antithesis of the clothing produced in both the UK and the United States during the war." The collection provoked widespread protest—in the United States, a "Little Below the Knee Club" spread to all 48 states in opposition—yet women gradually adopted versions of the style at all price levels, and by the decade's end the New Look silhouette had become the dominant global fashion.

== People ==
=== Military leaders ===
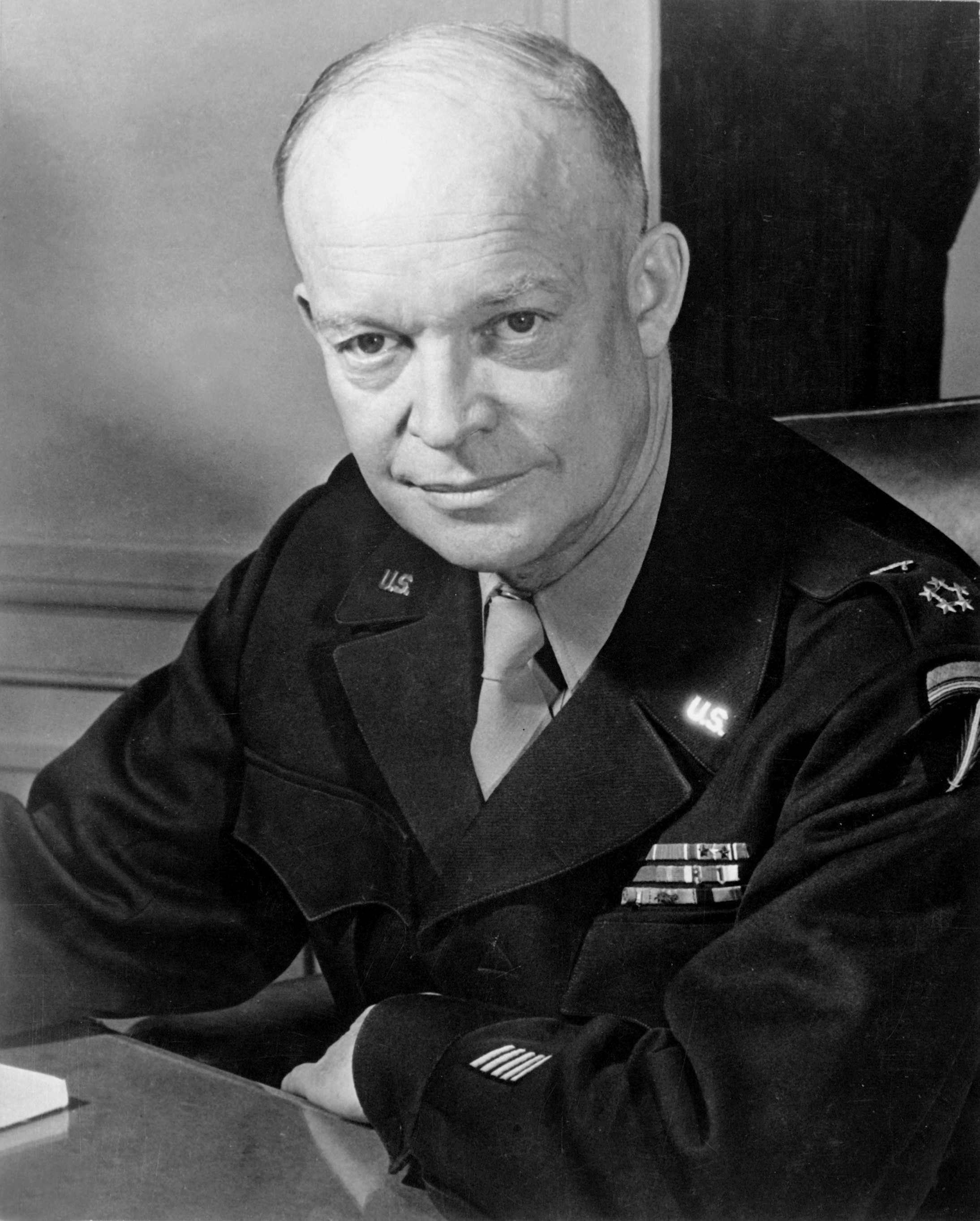
Dwight D. Eisenhower, American General who led the Allied forces during the Normandy invasion.

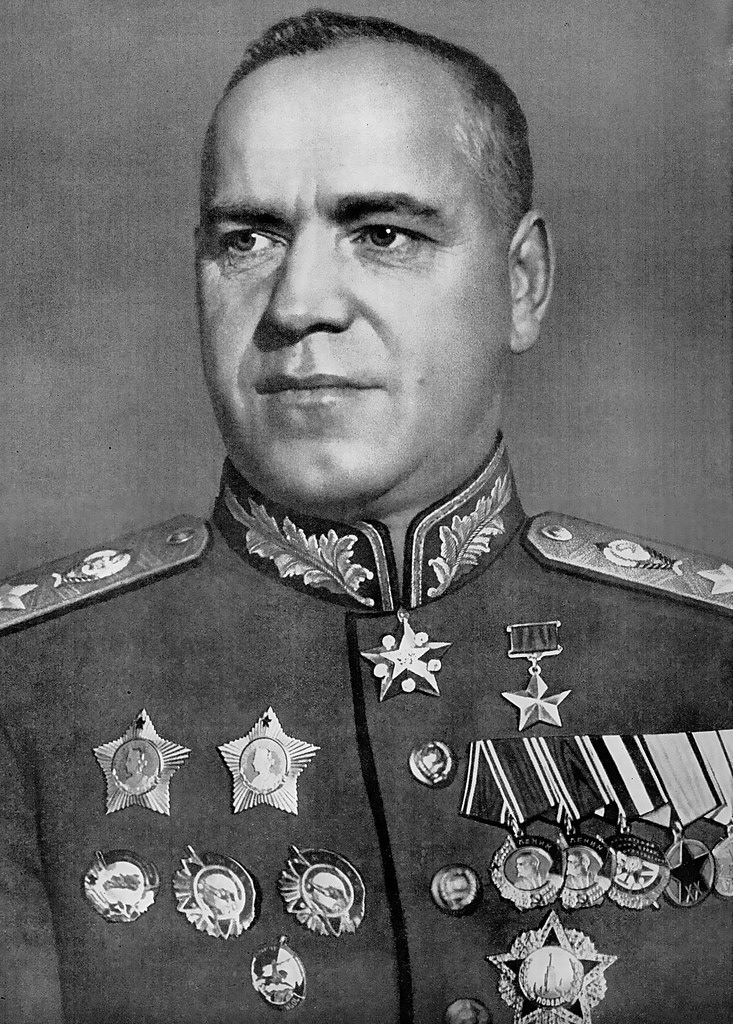
Georgy Zhukov, Soviet Union Field Marshal who led the Red Army during the Battle of Berlin.

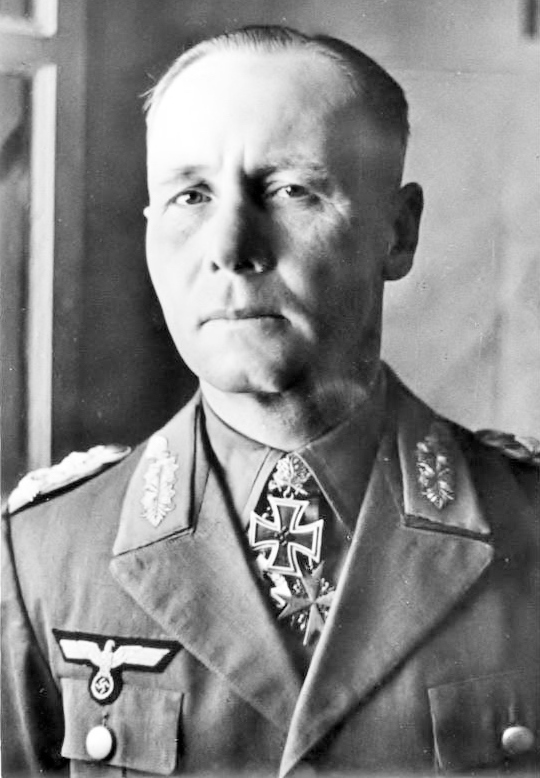
Erwin Rommel, German Field Marshal who led the Nazis during the North African Campaign.

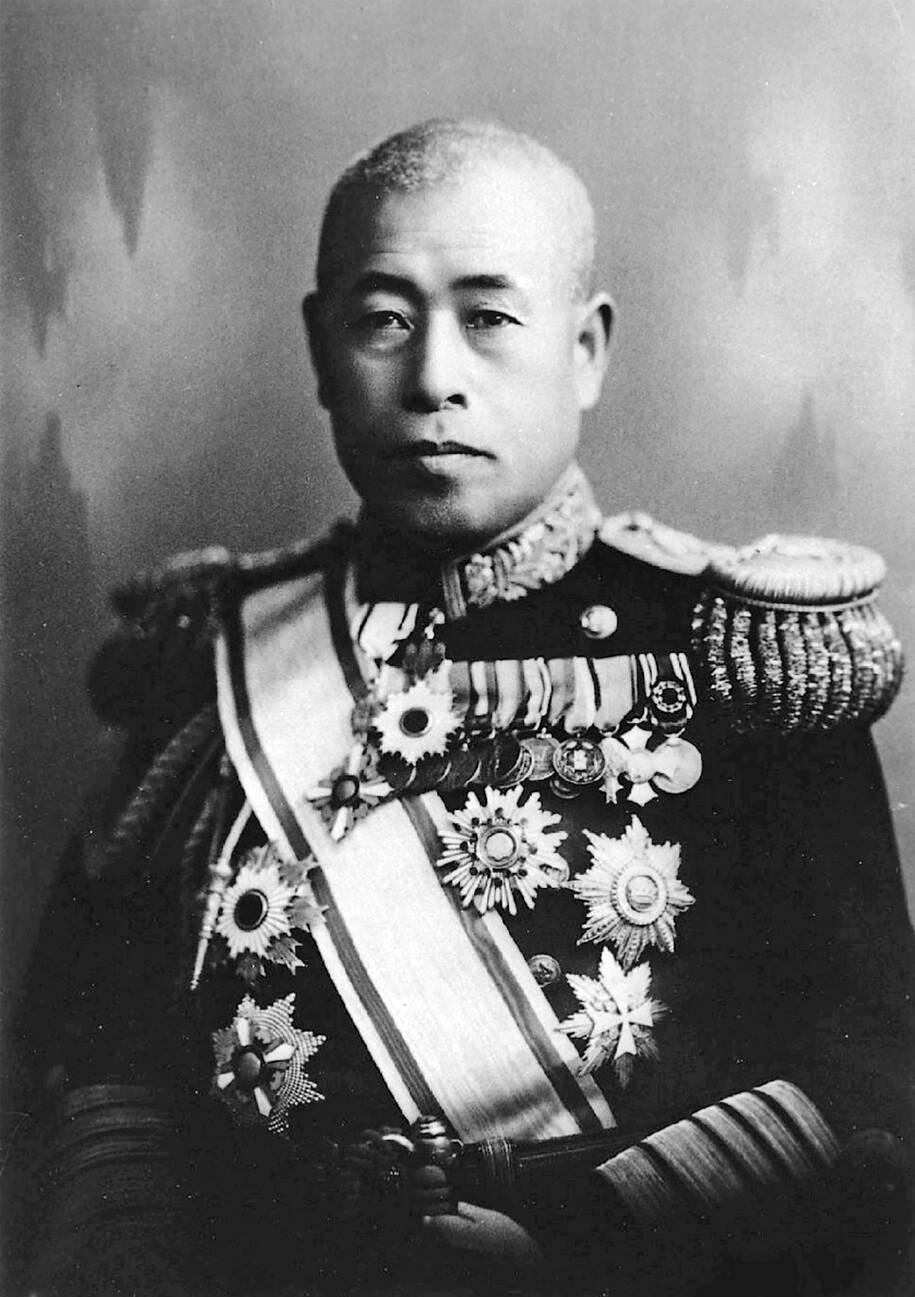
Yamamoto Isoroku, Japanese Fleet Admiral who led the Imperial Army during the attack on Pearl Harbor.

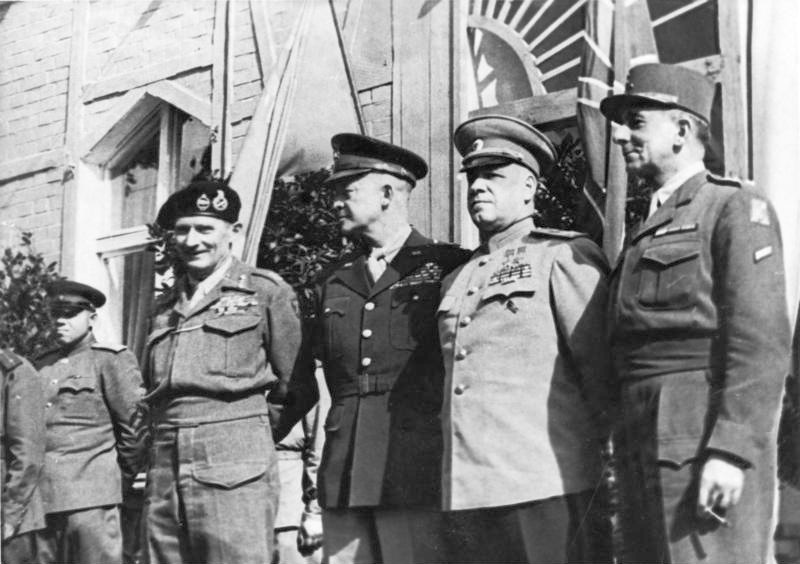
The Supreme Commanders on 5 June 1945 in Berlin: Bernard Montgomery, Dwight D. Eisenhower, Georgy Zhukov and Jean de Lattre de Tassigny.
- (Nazi Germany) Field Marshal Erwin Rommel
- (Nazi Germany) Reichsmarschall Hermann Göring
- (Nazi Germany) Field Marshal Erich von Manstein
- (Nazi Germany) Field Marshal Gerd von Rundstedt
- (Finland) Field Marshal Carl Gustaf Emil Mannerheim
- (Romania) Marshal Ion Antonescu
- (Empire of Japan) General Hideki Tōjō
- (Empire of Japan) General Kuniaki Koiso
- (Empire of Japan) Field Marshal Hajime Sugiyama
- (Empire of Japan) Fleet Admiral Isoroku Yamamoto
- (Empire of Japan) Fleet Admiral Osami Nagano
- (Soviet Union) Field Marshal Georgy Zhukov
- (Soviet Union) Field Marshal Ivan Konev
- (Soviet Union) Field Marshal Konstantin Rokossovsky
- (Soviet Union) Field Marshal Semyon Timoshenko
- (Soviet Union) Field Marshal Ivan Bagramyan
- (Soviet Union) Fleet Admiral Ivan Isakov
- (United States) General Dwight D. Eisenhower
- (United States) General George Marshall
- (United States) General Douglas MacArthur
- (United States) General Omar Bradley
- (United States) General George S. Patton
- (United States) Fleet Admiral Chester W. Nimitz
- (United States) Fleet Admiral Ernest J. King
- (United Kingdom) Field Marshal Harold Alexander
- (United Kingdom) Field Marshal Bernard Montgomery
- (France) Général d'Armée Jean de Lattre de Tassigny
- (France) Brigadier general Charles de Gaulle
- (Netherlands) General Henri Winkelman
- (Netherlands) General Bernhard of Lippe-Biesterfeld

=== Activists and religious leaders ===
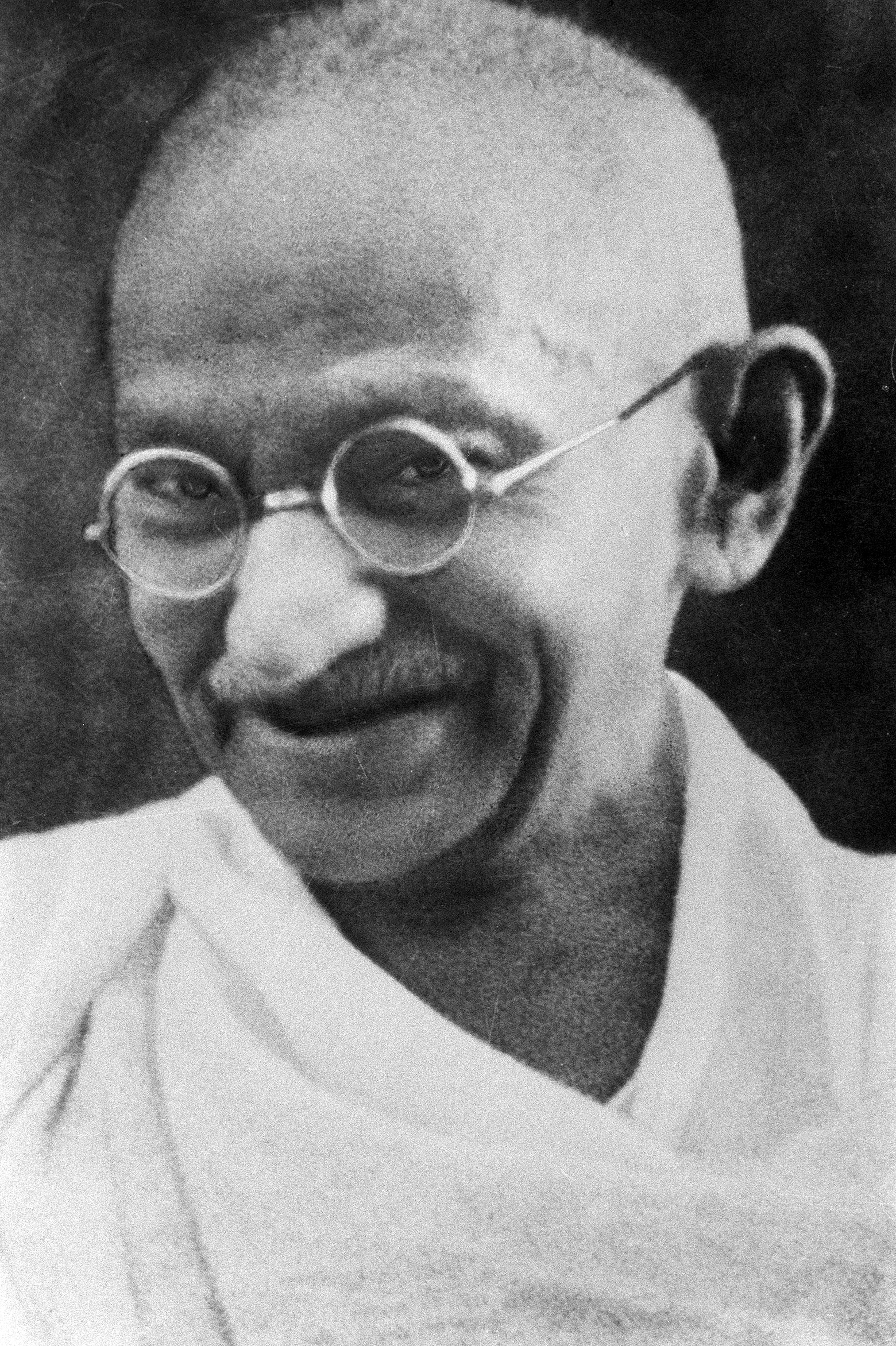
Mohandas Gandhi during the 1940s

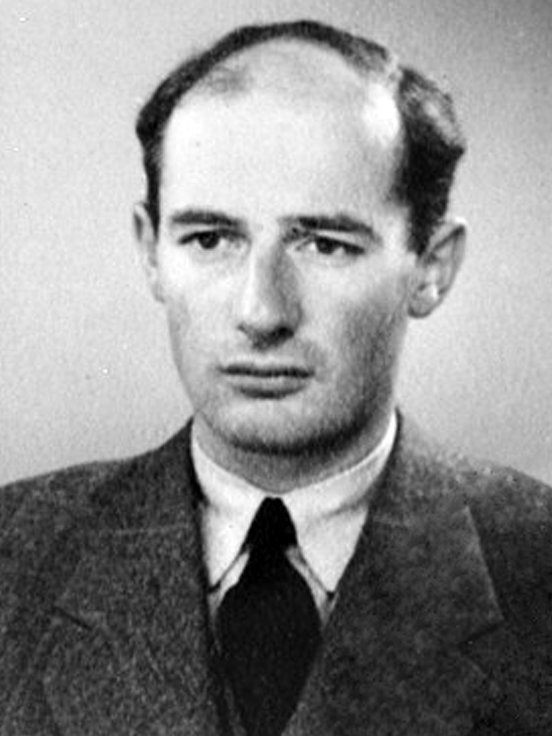
Raoul Wallenberg, c. 1944

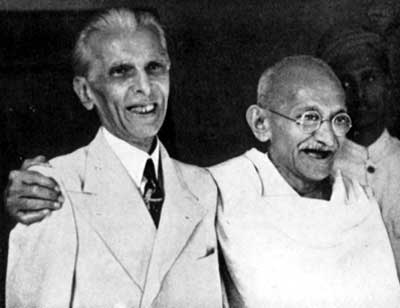
Muhammed Ali Jinnah with Gandhi, 1944.

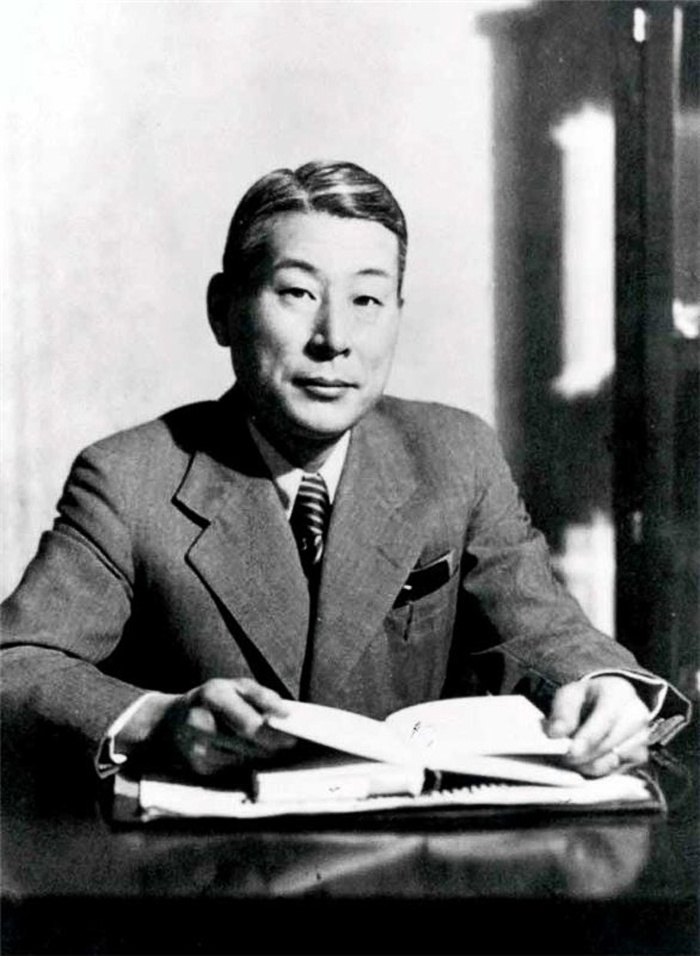
Chiune Sugihara c.1940s
- Joel Brand
- Behic Erkin
- Varian Fry
- Mohandas Gandhi
- Billy Graham
- Yitzhak HaLevi Herzog
- Muhammad Ali Jinnah
- Necdet Kent
- Aristides de Sousa Mendes
- Pope Pius XII
- Martha Sharp
- Waitstill Sharp
- Chiune Sugihara
- Raoul Wallenberg

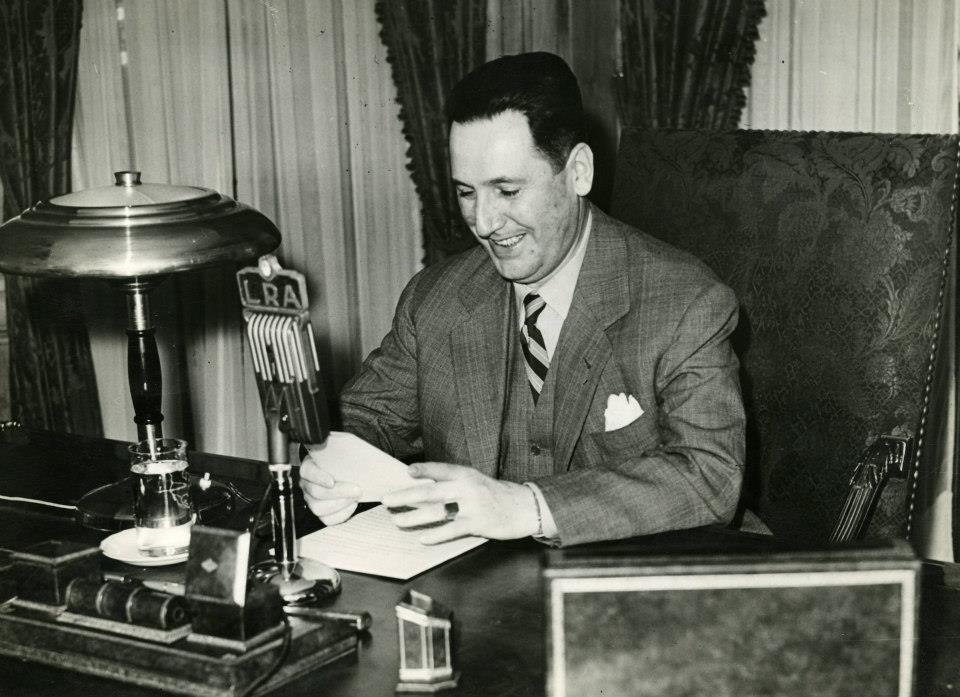
Juan Perón giving a radio speech from his office.

=== Politics ===
- Abdel Rahman Azzam Pasha, Secretary-general Arab League
- Georgi Mikhailov Dimitrov, Chairman of the Executive Committee Communist International
- Camille Gutt, Managing Director International Monetary Fund
- Jacques Camille Paris, Secretary-general Council of Europe
- Edward Warner, President of the Council International Civil Aviation Organization
- John G. Winant, Director International Labour Organization
- Juan Domingo Perón, President of the Argentine Republic

=== Scientists and engineers ===
- John Bardeen
- John Eckert
- Enrico Fermi
- Peter Goldmark
- Abraham Maslow
- J. Robert Oppenheimer
- John von Neumann
- Harry Nyquist
- Claude Shannon
- Alan Turing
- Robert Watson-Watt
- Norbert Wiener

=== Actors / Entertainers ===
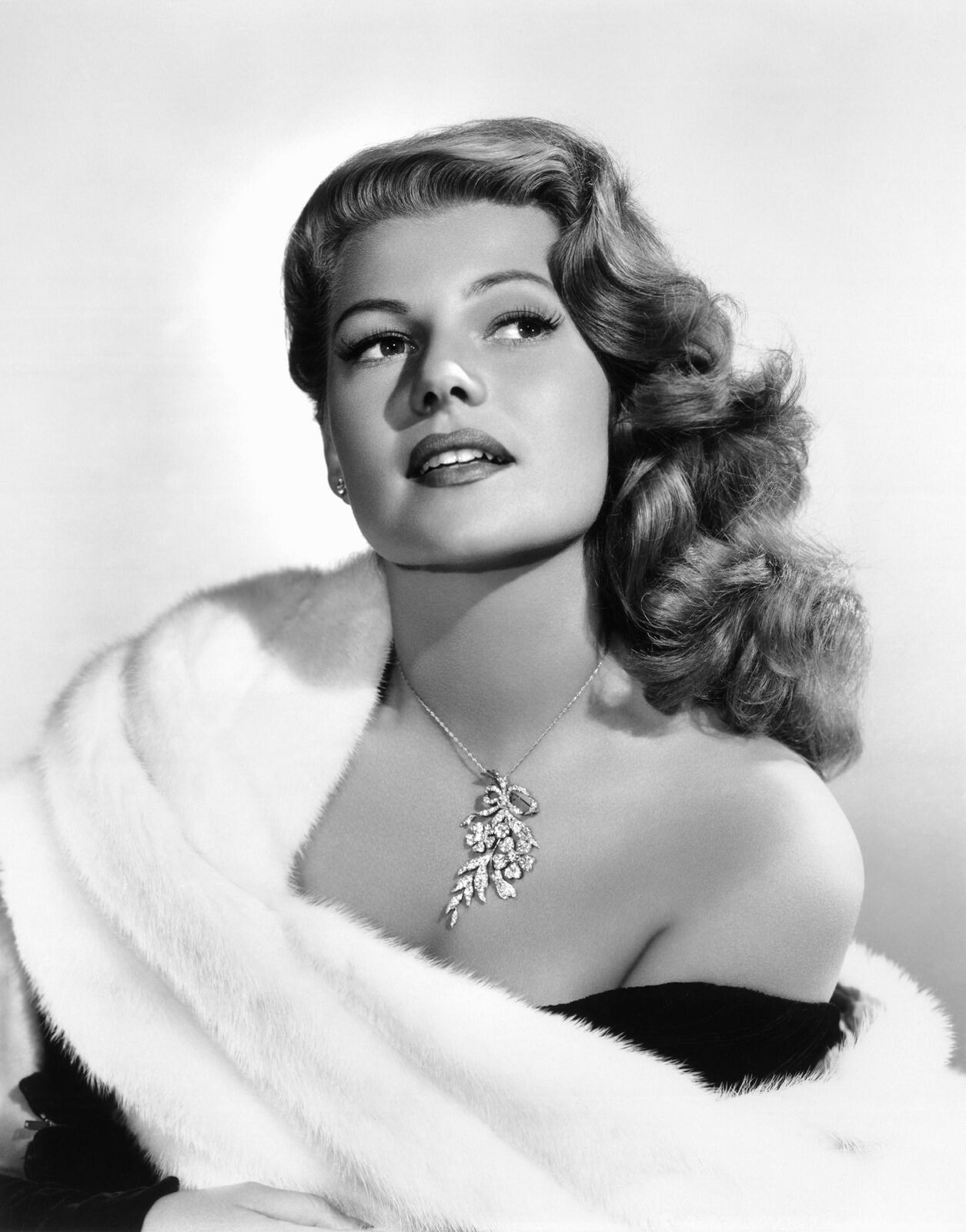
Rita Hayworth

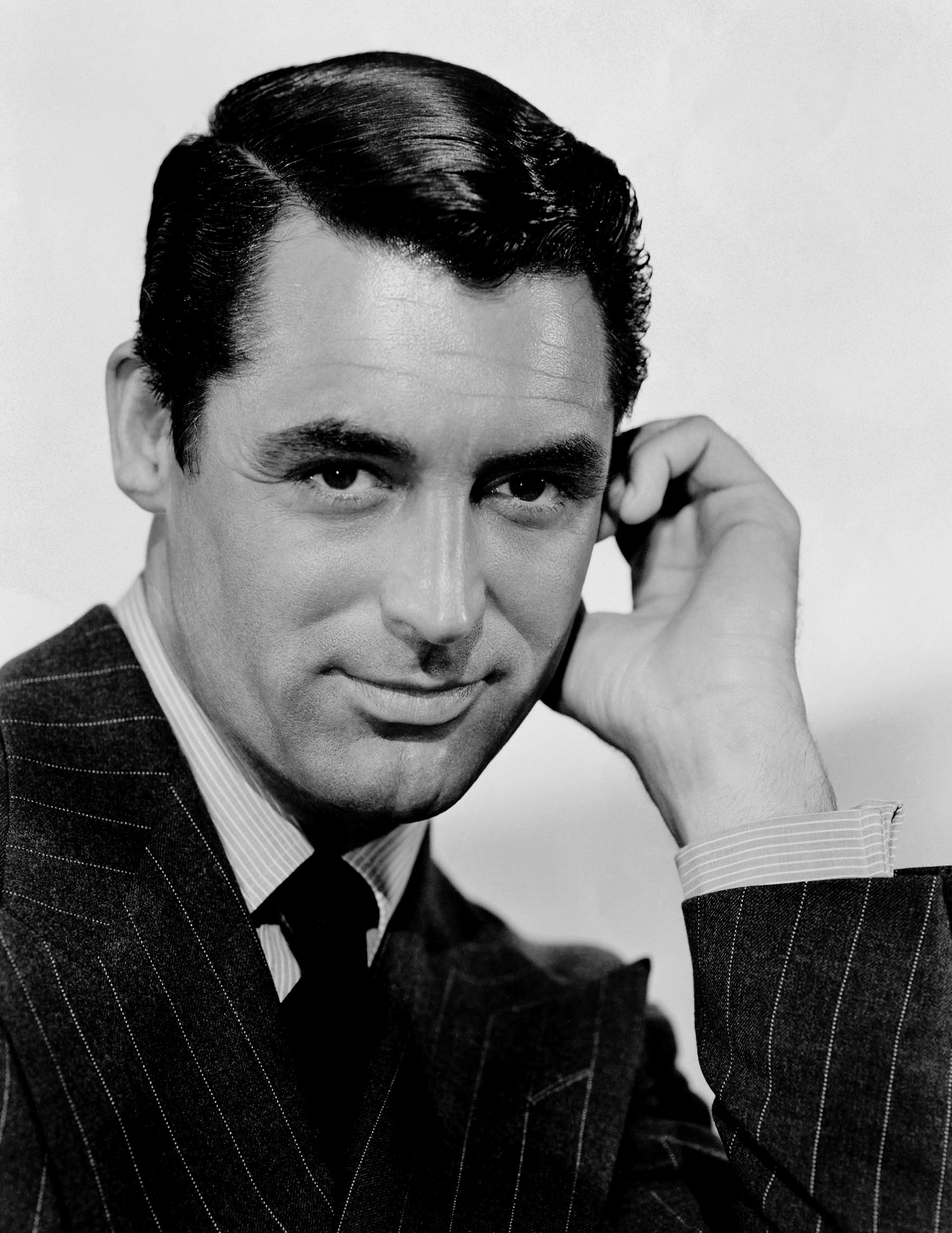
Cary Grant

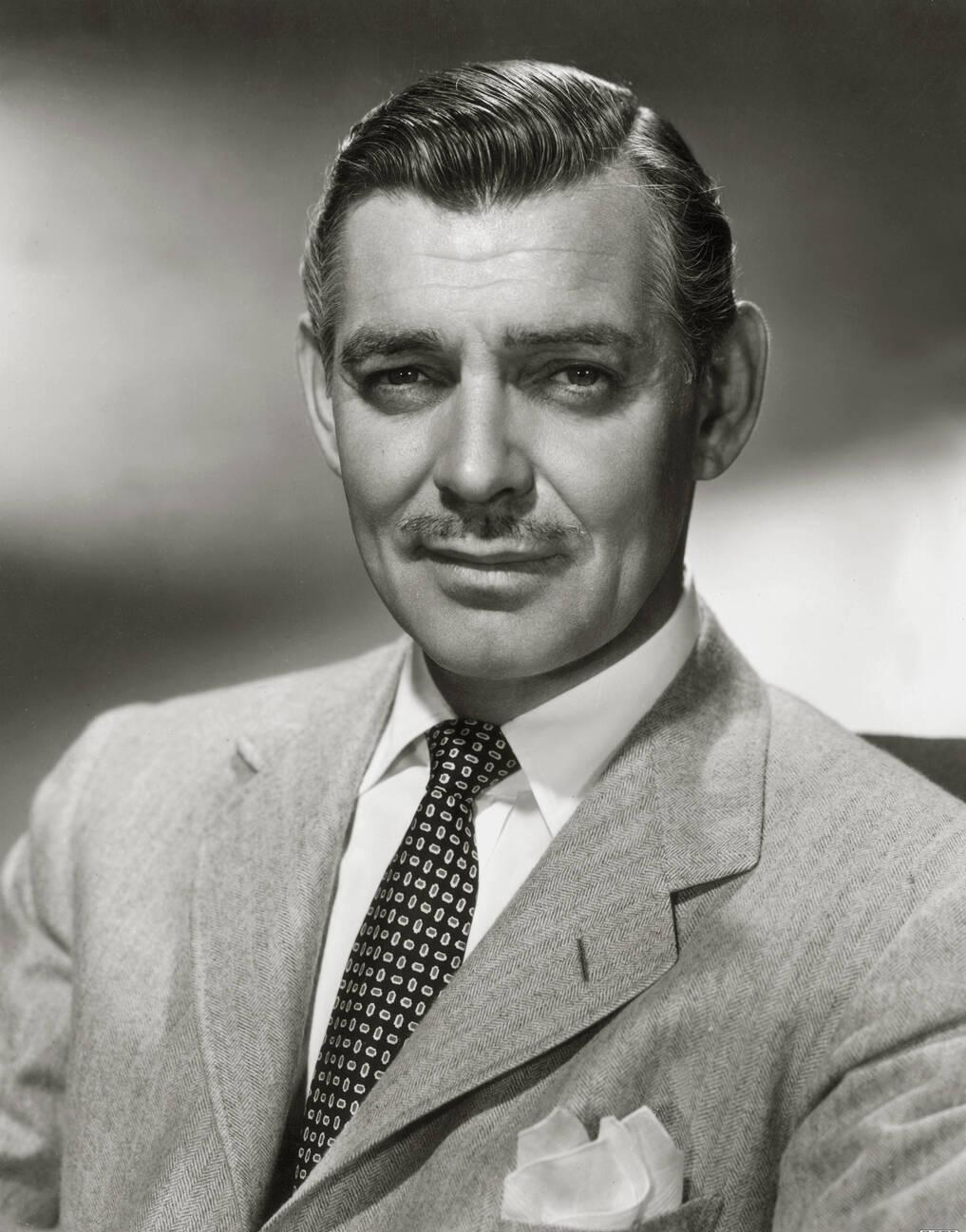
Clark Gable

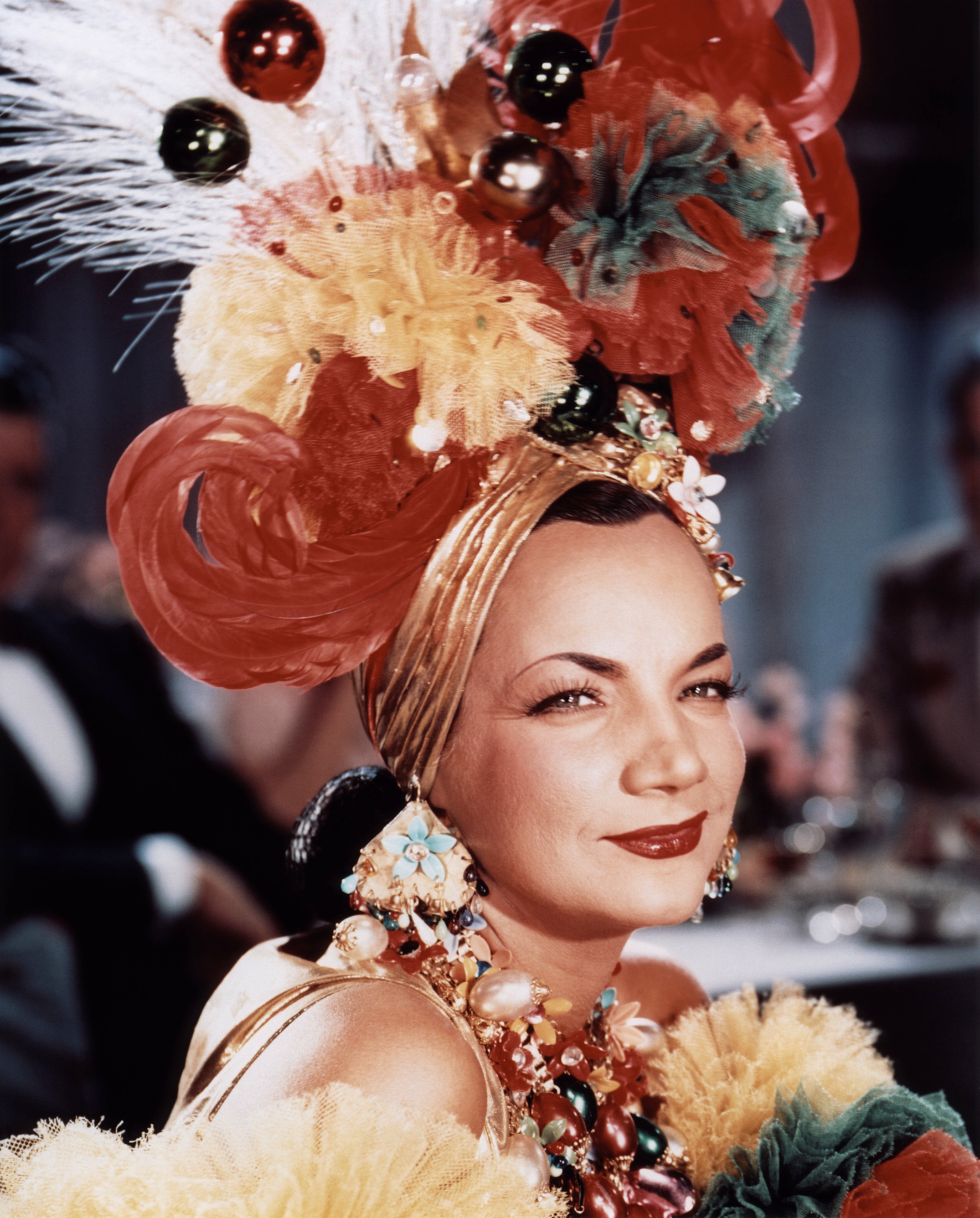
Carmen Miranda

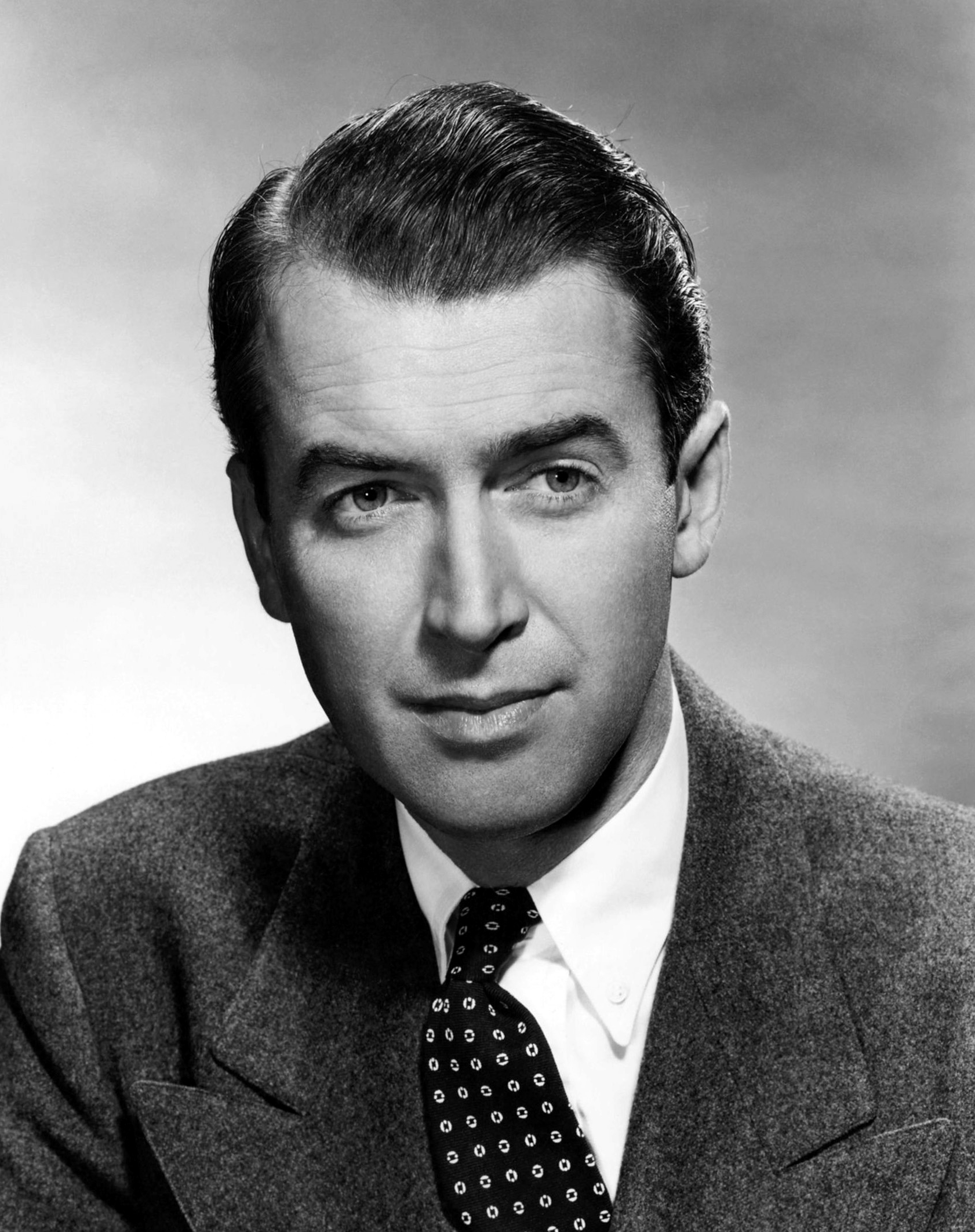
Jimmy Stewart
- Fred Allen
- Don Ameche
- Dana Andrews
- Edward Arnold
- Jean Arthur
- Fred Astaire
- Mary Astor
- Lauren Bacall
- Josephine Baker
- Lucille Ball
- Tallulah Bankhead
- Joseph Barbera
- Carl Barks
- Anne Baxter
- Ralph Bellamy
- Jack Benny
- William Bendix
- Ingrid Bergman
- Noah Beery Jr.
- Charles Bickford
- Vivian Blaine
- Humphrey Bogart
- Charles Boyer
- Walter Brennan
- Fanny Brice
- Lloyd Bridges
- Edgar Buchanan
- James Cagney
- Cab Calloway
- Yvonne De Carlo
- John Carradine
- Lon Chaney Jr.
- Charlie Chaplin
- Montgomery Clift
- Charles Coburn
- Claudette Colbert
- Ronald Colman
- Gary Cooper
- Katharine Cornell
- Abbott and Costello
- Joseph Cotten
- Joan Crawford
- Bing Crosby
- Arlene Dahl
- Dorothy Dandridge
- Linda Darnell
- Bette Davis
- Doris Day
- Olivia de Havilland
- William Demarest
- Richard Denning
- Marlene Dietrich
- Walt Disney
- Kirk Douglas
- Irene Dunne
- Alice Faye
- José Ferrer
- Larry Fine
- Barry Fitzgerald
- Errol Flynn
- Henry Fonda
- Joan Fontaine
- Clark Gable
- Ava Gardner
- Judy Garland
- Greer Garson
- Lillian Gish
- Paulette Goddard
- Betty Grable
- Gloria Grahame
- Cary Grant
- Kathryn Grayson
- Virginia Grey
- Sydney Greenstreet
- Edmund Gwenn
- Carl Stuart Hamblen
- William Hanna
- Olivia de Havilland
- Helen Hayes
- Susan Hayward
- Rita Hayworth
- Van Heflin
- Katharine Hepburn
- William Holden
- Bob Hope
- Lena Horne
- Curly Howard
- Moe Howard
- Shemp Howard
- Walter Huston
- Betty Hutton
- Pedro Infante
- Burl Ives
- Anne Jeffreys
- Van Johnson
- Glynis Johns
- Jennifer Jones
- Boris Karloff
- Danny Kaye
- Gene Kelly
- Deborah Kerr
- Alan Ladd
- Veronica Lake
- Hedy Lamarr
- Dorothy Lamour
- Burt Lancaster
- Laurel and Hardy
- Charles Laughton
- Peter Lawford
- Janet Leigh
- Vivien Leigh
- Norman Lloyd
- Gene Lockhart
- June Lockhart
- Carole Lombard
- Peter Lorre
- Myrna Loy
- Vera Lynn
- Ida Lupino
- Fred MacMurray
- Victor Mature
- Fredric March
- Herbert Marshall
- James Mason
- Burgess Meredith
- Ray Milland
- Carmen Miranda
- Robert Montgomery
- Marilyn Monroe
- Dennis Morgan
- Frank Morgan
- Harry Morgan
- Jorge Negrete
- Margaret O'Brien
- Maureen O'Hara
- Laurence Olivier
- Janis Paige
- Gregory Peck
- Walter Pidgeon
- Dick Powell
- Eleanor Powell
- Jane Powell
- William Powell
- Tyrone Power
- Robert Preston
- Anthony Quinn
- Claude Rains
- Basil Rathbone
- Martha Raye
- Ronald Reagan
- Donna Reed
- George Reeves
- Michael Redgrave
- Dolores del Río
- Edward G. Robinson
- Ginger Rogers
- Roy Rogers
- Cesar Romero
- Mickey Rooney
- Rosalind Russell
- George Sanders
- Joseph Schildkraut
- Lizabeth Scott
- Randolph Scott
- Jean Simmons
- Frank Sinatra
- Red Skelton
- Lionel Stander
- Barbara Stanwyck
- James Stewart
- Lewis Stone
- Barry Sullivan
- Ed Sullivan
- Lyle Talbot
- Elizabeth Taylor
- Robert Taylor
- Shirley Temple
- The Three Stooges
- Gene Tierney
- Spencer Tracy
- Lana Turner
- Robert Walker
- John Wayne
- Orson Welles
- Richard Widmark
- Cornel Wilde
- Jane Wyman
- Keenan Wynn
- Loretta Young

=== Musicians ===
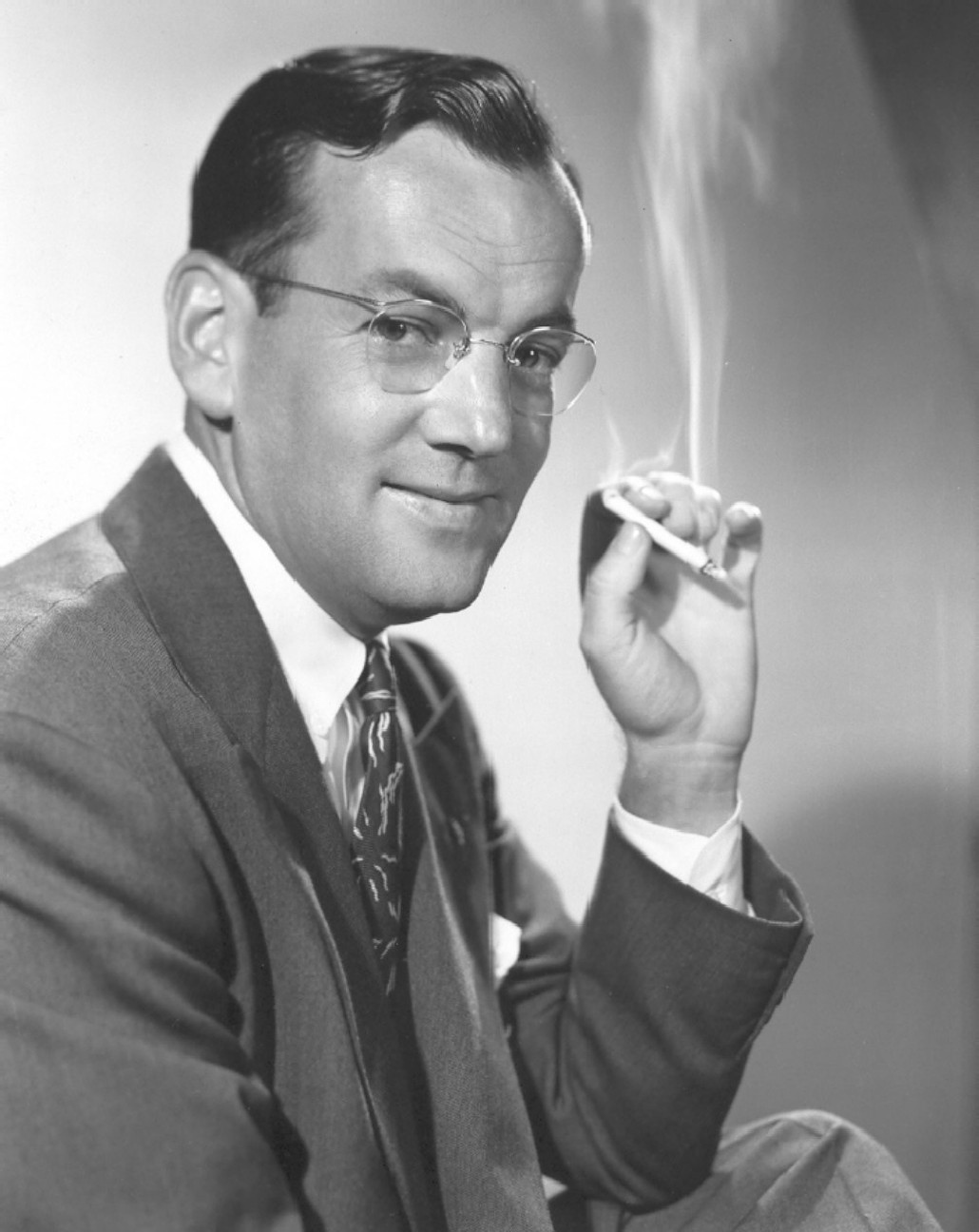
Glenn Miller, 1941

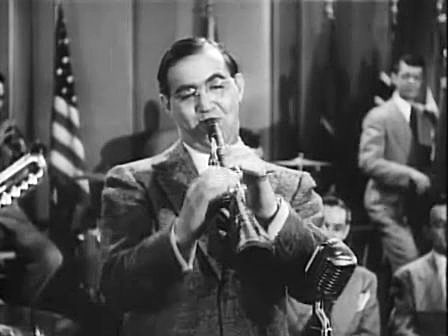
Benny Goodman performing in Stage Door Canteen (1943)

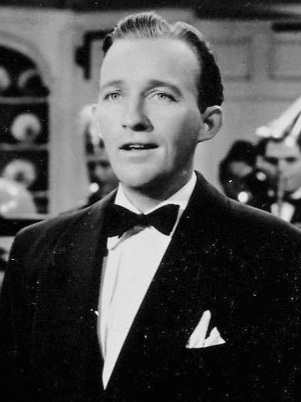
Bing Crosby, 1942

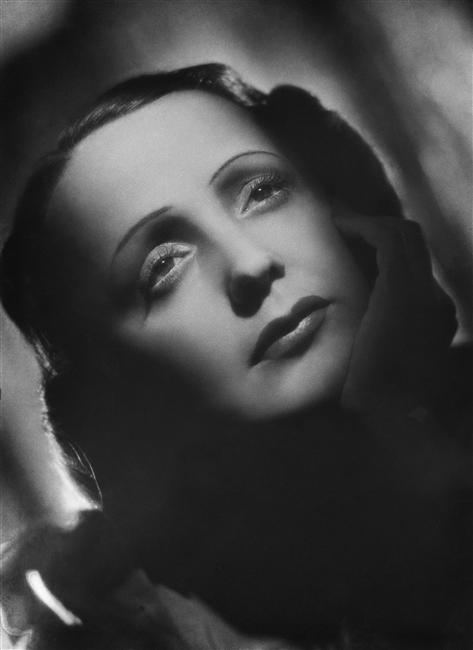
Édith Piaf, 1946

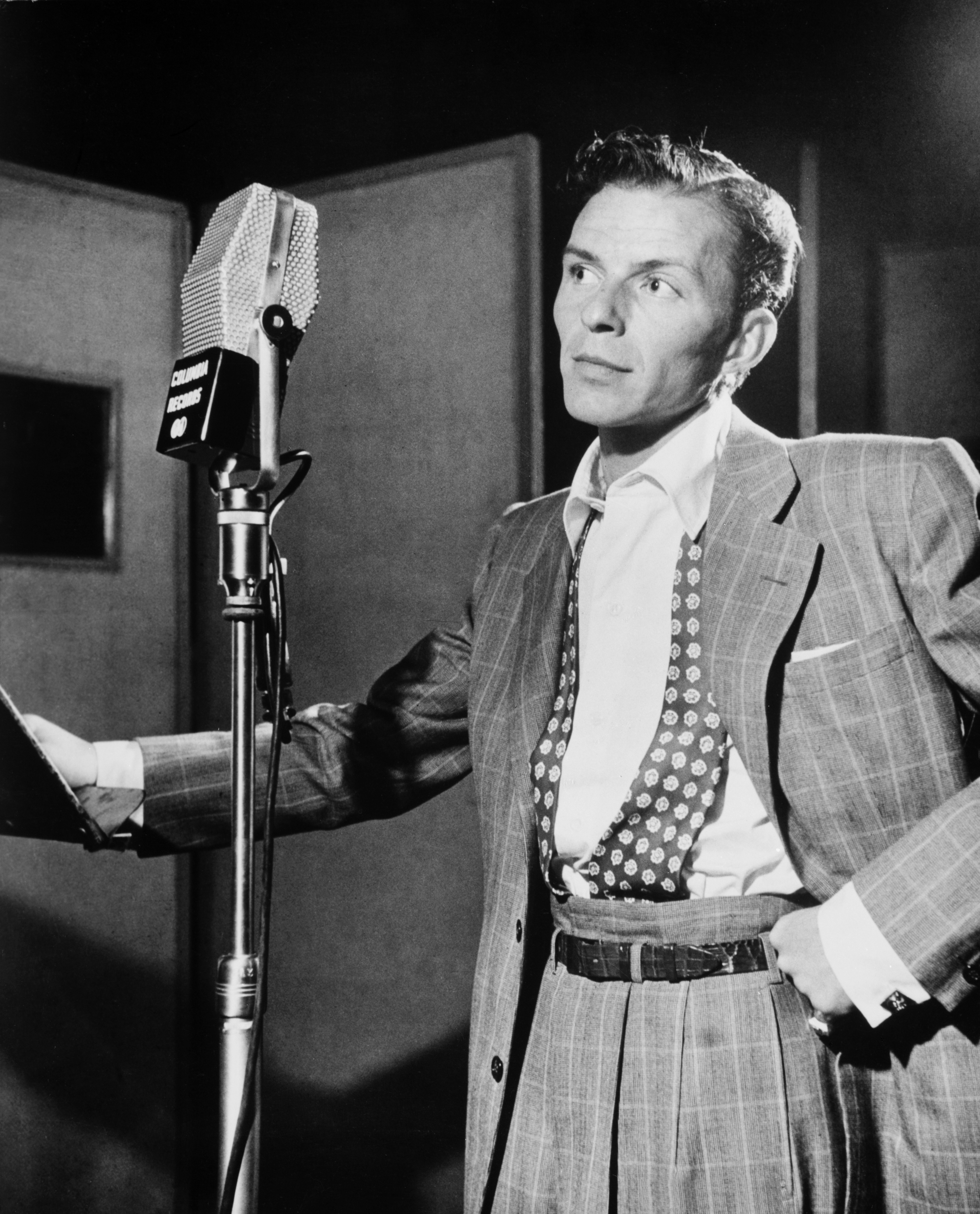
Frank Sinatra, 1947
- Marian Anderson
- Louis Armstrong
- Eddy Arnold
- Gene Autry
- Pearl Bailey
- Benny Carter
- Ray Charles
- Charlie Barnet
- Count Basie
- Irving Berlin
- Al Bowlly
- Les Brown
- Erskine Butterfield
- Sammy Cahn
- Cab Calloway
- Nat King Cole
- Perry Como
- Bing Crosby
- Bob Crosby
- Miles Davis
- Willie Dixon
- Jimmy Dorsey
- Tommy Dorsey
- K. C. Douglas
- Champion Jack Dupree
- Billy Eckstine
- Duke Ellington
- H-Bomb Ferguson
- Ella Fitzgerald
- Ira Gershwin
- Dizzy Gillespie
- Benny Goodman
- Stéphane Grappelli
- Homer Harris
- Screamin' Jay Hawkins
- Richard Hayman
- Dick Haymes
- Earl Hines
- Billie Holiday
- John Lee Hooker
- Lena Horne
- Betty Hutton
- Sir Lancelot
- Big Joe Turner
- Bull Moose Jackson
- Mahalia Jackson
- Harry James
- Louis Jordan
- Blind Willie Johnson
- Al Jolson
- Kitty Kallen
- Danny Kaye
- Sammy Kaye
- Stan Kenton
- B.B. King
- Evelyn Knight
- Gene Krupa
- Frankie Laine
- Mario Lanza
- Peggy Lee
- Dean Martin
- Grady Martin
- Johnny Mercer
- Amos Milburn
- Glenn Miller
- Roy Milton
- Charles Mingus
- Thelonious Monk
- Vaughn Monroe
- Benny Moré
- Ray Noble
- Charlie Parker
- Les Paul
- Édith Piaf
- Cole Porter
- Bud Powell
- Louis Prima
- Django Reinhardt
- Pete Johnson
- Max Roach
- Marty Robbins
- Paul Robeson
- Richard Rodgers
- Artie Shaw
- Dinah Shore
- Frank Sinatra
- Memphis Slim
- Kate Smith
- Billy Strayhorn
- Maxine Sullivan
- Art Tatum
- Martha Tilton
- Ernest Tubb
- Sarah Vaughan
- T-Bone Walker
- Little Walter
- Muddy Waters
- Margaret Whiting
- Cootie Williams
- Hank Williams
- Tex Williams
- Bob Wills
- Teddy Wilson

=== Bands ===
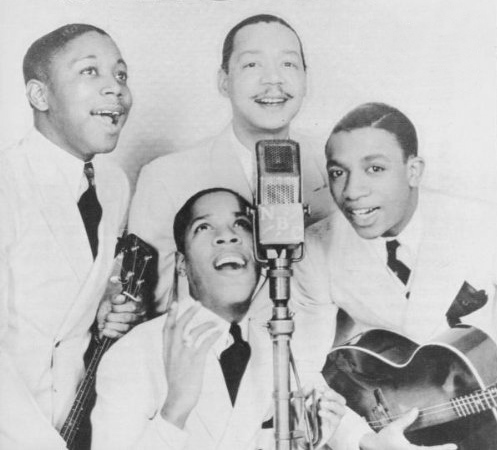
The Ink Spots in 1944, a popular swing band of the era

- The Andrews Sisters
- The Boswell Sisters
- The Ink Spots
- The Merry Macs
- The Mills Brothers
- The Pied Pipers
- The Ravens
- The Robins
- Sons of The Pioneers

=== Sports ===
During the 1940s, sporting events were disrupted and changed by the events that engaged and shaped the entire world. The 1940 and 1944 Olympic Games were cancelled because of World War II. During World War II in the United States Heavyweight Boxing Champion Joe Louis and numerous stars and performers from American baseball and other sports served in the armed forces until the end of the war. Among the many baseball players (including well known stars) who served during World War II were Moe Berg, Joe DiMaggio, Bob Feller, Hank Greenberg, Stan Musial (in 1945), Warren Spahn, and Ted Williams. They like many others sacrificed their personal and valuable career time for the benefit and well-being of the rest of society. The Summer Olympics were resumed in 1948 in London and the Winter games were held that year in St. Moritz, Switzerland.

In 1947, Wataru Misaka of the New York Knicks became the first person of color to play in modern professional basketball, just months after Jackie Robinson had broken the color barrier in Major League Baseball for the Brooklyn Dodgers.

==== Baseball ====
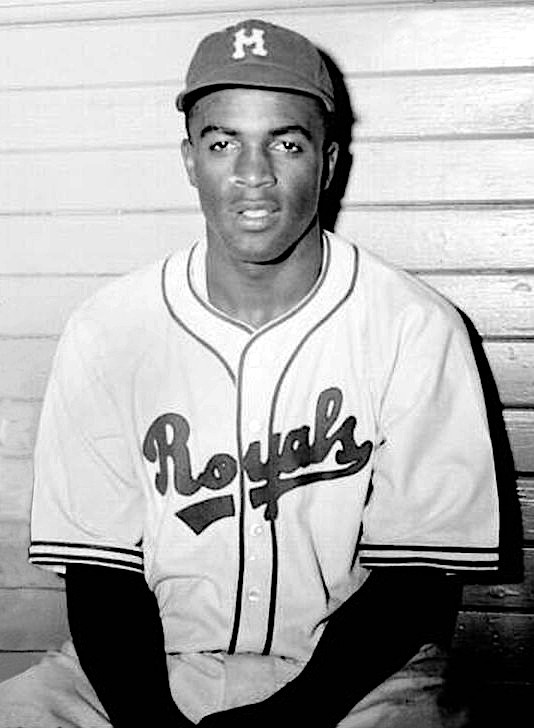
Jackie Robinson with the Montreal Royals in July 1946

During the early 1940s World War II had an enormous impact on Major League Baseball as many players including many of the most successful stars joined the war effort. After the war many players returned to their teams, while the major event of the second half of the 1940s was the 1945 signing of Jackie Robinson to a players contract by Branch Rickey the general manager of the Brooklyn Dodgers. Signing Robinson opened the door to the integration of Major League Baseball finally putting an end to the professional discrimination that had characterized the sport since the 19th century.

- Roy Campanella
- Joe DiMaggio
- Bill Dickey
- Larry Doby
- Bob Feller
- Josh Gibson
- Hank Greenberg
- Monte Irvin
- Buck Leonard
- Johnny Mize
- Stan Musial
- Satchel Paige
- Branch Rickey
- Jackie Robinson
- Ted Williams

==== Boxing ====
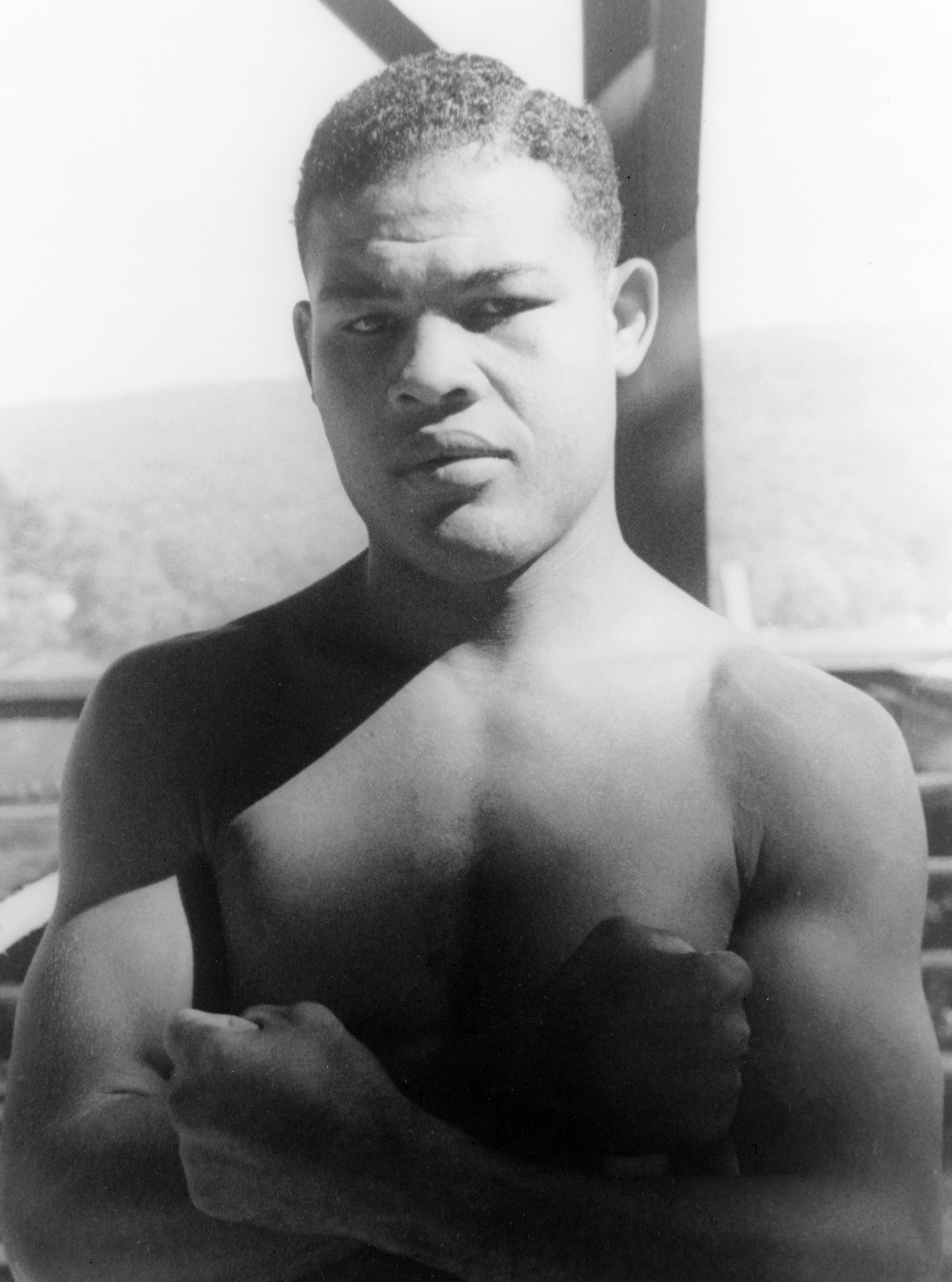
Joe Louis in 1941, world heavyweight boxing champion

During the mid-1930s and throughout the years leading up to the 1940s Joe Louis was an enormously popular Heavyweight boxer. In 1936, he lost an important 12 round fight (his first loss) to the German boxer Max Schmeling and he vowed to meet Schmeling once again in the ring. Louis' comeback bout against Schmeling became an international symbol of the struggle between the US and democracy against Nazism and Fascism. When on June 22, 1938, Louis knocked Schmeling out in the first few seconds of the first round during their rematch at Yankee Stadium, his sensational comeback victory riveted the entire nation. Louis enlisted in the U.S. Army on January 10, 1942, in response to the Japanese attack on Pearl Harbor. Louis' cultural impact was felt well outside the ring. He is widely regarded as the first African American to achieve the status of a nationwide hero within the United States, and was also a focal point of anti-Nazi sentiment leading up to and during World War II.

- Buddy Baer
- Ezzard Charles
- Billy Conn
- Rocky Graziano
- Joe Louis
- Sugar Ray Robinson
- Max Schmeling
- Jersey Joe Walcott
- Tony Zale

== See also ==
- List of decades, centuries, and millennia
- 1940s in television
- List of years in literature § 1940s
- Greatest Generation (the remaining members of that generation came of age in the first half of the decade to serve in WW II)
- Silent Generation (the older members of that demographic had matured in the second half of this decade)

=== Timeline ===
The following articles contain brief timelines listing the most prominent events of the decade.

- 1940 • 1941 • 1942 • 1943 • 1944 • 1945 • 1946 • 1947 • 1948 • 1949
