= 1963 in animation =

Events in 1963 in animation.

== Events ==
=== January ===
- January 1: The first episode of Astro Boy airs, based on the manga series by Osamu Tezuka.
- January 25: The Flintstones episode "The Surprise" is first broadcast where Wilma Flintstone announces to Fred that she is pregnant. This is the first time that an animated character is depicted being pregnant.

=== February ===
- February 9: Friz Freleng's Bugs Bunny and Yosemite Sam cartoon Devil's Feud Cake premieres, produced by Warner Bros. Cartoons.
- February 22: The Flintstones episode "The Blessed Event" is first broadcast, where Pebbles Flintstone is born.

=== March ===
- March 9: Robert McKimson and Ted Bonnicksen's Daffy Duck cartoon Fast Buck Duck premieres, produced by Warner Bros. Cartoons. Also starring Hector the Bulldog (named Percy in this short).
- March 24: Yūgo Serikawa's The Little Prince and the Eight-Headed Dragon premieres.

=== April ===
- April 6: Robert McKimson's Bugs Bunny and Daffy Duck cartoon The Million Hare premieres, produced by Warner Bros. Cartoons.
- April 8: 35th Academy Awards: The Hole by John Hubley and Faith Hubley wins the Academy Award for Best Animated Short Film.
- April 20: Friz Freleng's Speedy Gonzales and Sylvester cartoon Mexican Cat Dance premieres, produced by Warner Bros. Cartoons.
- April 27: Chuck Jones' Now Hear This premieres.

=== May ===
- May 11: Phil Monroe and Richard Thompson's Ralph Wolf and Sam Sheepdog cartoon Woolen Under Where premieres, produced by Warner Bros. Cartoons. It's the final appearances of Ralph and Sam in the Golden age of American animation.
- May 20: Ernest Pintoff's The Critic, with voice-work by Mel Brooks, premieres.

=== June ===
- June 8: Chuck Jones and Maurice Noble's Wile E. Coyote and Road Runner cartoon Hare-Breadth Hurry premieres, produced by Warner Bros. Cartoons. Bugs Bunny actually take the place of the Road Runner in this short.
- June 29: Robert McKimson's cartoon Banty Raids premieres, produced by Warner Bros. Cartoons, starring Foghorn Leghorn and Barnyard Dawg. This was Barnyard Dawg's final appearance in the Golden Age of Animation, but Foghorn later makes a cameo in Bugs Bunny's final cartoon False Hare the following year.

=== July ===
- July 27: Pent-House Mouse, the first Tom and Jerry cartoon by Chuck Jones is first released.

=== August ===
- August 12: The first episode of Bolek and Lolek airs.
- August 17: Friz Freleng's Speedy Gonzales and Sylvester cartoon Chili Weather premieres, produced by Warner Bros. Cartoons.

=== September ===
- September 1: The first episode of The Mighty Hercules airs.
- September 7: Friz Freleng's Bugs Bunny cartoon The Unmentionables premieres, produced by Warner Bros. Cartoons. Also starring Rocky and Mugsy (making their final appearance in the Golden Age of Animation).
- September 19: The Flintstones episode "Ann-Margrock Presents" is first broadcast, guest starring Ann-Margret.
- September 28:
  - Robert McKimson's Daffy Duck cartoon Aqua Duck premieres, produced by Warner Bros. Cartoons.
  - The first episode of Tennessee Tuxedo and His Tales airs.

=== October ===
- October 3: The Flintstones episode "Little Bamm-Bamm" is first broadcast where Bamm-Bamm Rubble is delivered at Barney and Betty Rubble's doorstep and adopted by them.
- October 5: The first episode of Le Manège Enchanté (The Magic Roundabout) airs.
- October 19: Chuck Jones and Maurice Noble's Bugs Bunny cartoon Mad as a Mars Hare premieres, produced by Warner Bros. Cartoons. This was Marvin the Martian's final appearance in the Golden Age of Animation.

=== November ===
- November 9: Robert McKimson's Sylvester cartoon Claws in the Lease premieres, produced by Warner Bros. Cartoons. Also starring Sylvester Jr.
- November 11: The first episode of Wolf Boy Ken airs.
- November 30: Chuck Jones and Maurice Noble's Bugs Bunny cartoon Transylvania 6-5000 premieres, produced by Warner Bros. Cartoons.

=== December ===
- December 21: Akira Daikubara's Doggie March is first released.
- December 25: The Sword in the Stone, directed by Wolfgang Reitherman and produced by the Walt Disney Company is first released.
- December 28: Chuck Jones, Maurice Noble, & Tom Ray's Wile E. Coyote and Road Runner cartoon To Beep or Not to Beep premieres, produced by Warner Bros. Cartoons. This was one of the 3 cartoons to be revamped from the cancelled TV pilot Adventures of the Road Runner.
- December 31: The first episode of Dáithí Lacha airs.
- Warner Bros. Cartoons closes down, but will reopen in 1967.

=== Specific date unknown ===
- DePatie–Freleng Enterprises is founded by Friz Freleng and David DePatie.
- The first episode of Rod Rocket airs.
- Stan Brakhage's Mothlight is released.
- Arthur Lipsett's 21-87 premieres.
- Lawsuits were filed against Hanna-Barbera Productions by Morey Amsterdam and Pat Carroll for breach of contract. They had been initially cast and signed to the roles of George and Jane Jetson, but they were then replaced.

== Films released ==
- January 1:
  - Comahue (Argentina)
  - The Peacock Princess (China)
- March 24 - The Little Prince and the Eight-Headed Dragon (Japan)
- December 21 - Doggie March (Japan)
- December 25 - The Sword in the Stone (United States)

== Television series ==
- January 1 - Astro Boy debuts on Fuji TV.
- April 7:
  - Ginga Shônentai debuts on NHK.
  - Space Patrol debuts on ITV.
- September 1 - The Mighty Hercules debuts on NBC.
- September 4 - Sennin Buraku debuts on Fuji TV.
- September 28 - Tennessee Tuxedo and His Tales debuts on CBS.
- October 5:
  - Hector Heathcote Show debuts on NBC.
  - The New Casper Cartoon Show debuts on ABC.
- October 20 - Tetsujin 28-Go (a.k.a. Gigantor) debuts on Fuji TV.
- November 7 - Eitoman debuts on TBS.
- November 25 - Ōkami shônen Ken debuts on TV Asahi.
- Specific date unknown:
  - Bleep and Booster debuts on BBC.
  - Daithi Lacha debuts on RTÉ.
  - Le Manège Enchanté debuts on ORTF and BBC.
  - Mr. Piper debuts on CBC.
  - Rod Rocket and The Funny Company debut in syndication.

== Births ==
=== January ===
- January 4: Dave Foley, Canadian-American actor and comedian (voice of Flik in A Bug's Life, Terry in Monsters University, Warren Ampersand in Adventure Time, Chris in Dan Vs., Francis Grey in The Batman episode "Seconds").
- January 10:
  - Marc du Pontavice, French animation producer (Gaumont Multimédia, co-founder of Xilam).
  - Kurt Heinecke, American musician, songwriter, photographer, voice actor and composer (VeggieTales, 3-2-1 Penguins!, Superbook).
- January 11:
  - Sam Kieth, American comics artist and screenwriter (What a Cartoon!), (d. 2026).
  - Pres Romanillos, American animator and film producer (Walt Disney Animation Studios, DreamWorks Animation), (d. 2010).
  - Brad Vandergrift, American animator (The Ren & Stimpy Show, The Critic, The Simpsons, Timon & Pumbaa, The SpongeBob Movie: Sponge Out of Water) and storyboard artist (Klutter!, Johnny Bravo, Disney Television Animation, The Brave Little Toaster to the Rescue, The Brave Little Toaster Goes to Mars, Mickey, Donald, Goofy: The Three Musketeers, Nickelodeon Animation Studio).
- January 20: James Denton, American actor (voice of Superman in All-Star Superman).

=== February ===
- February 2: Kirk Baily, American voice actor (voice of adult Millions Knives in Trigun, Shin in Cowboy Bebop, Robber D in Cowboy Bebop: The Movie, additional voices in The Brave Little Toaster, Mobile Suit Gundam 0083: Stardust Memory, Aladdin, Ah! My Goddess: The Movie, The Road to El Dorado, Metropolis, Sinbad: Legend of the Seven Seas, Mickey, Donald, Goofy: The Three Musketeers, Shark Tale, Mickey's Twice Upon a Christmas, Over the Hedge, Open Season, The Little Mermaid: Ariel's Beginning, The Tale of Despereaux, Dead Space: Downfall, Open Season 3, Yogi Bear, Rango, Hoodwinked Too! Hood vs. Evil, Hop, The Smurfs: A Christmas Carol, ParaNorman, The Lorax, Hotel Transylvania, Frozen, Despicable Me 2, Minions, Big Hero 6, The Star, The Boss Baby, The Lego Movie 2: The Second Part, Missing Link, Sonic the Hedgehog, The SpongeBob Movie: Sponge on the Run, Tom & Jerry, Love, Death & Robots and Paws of Fury: The Legend of Hank), (d. 2022).
- February 9: Travis Tritt, American country singer (voice of Walt in the King of the Hill episode "Livin' on Reds, Vitamin C and Propane" and Farmer Hero in the Higglytown Heroes episode "Halloween Heroes").
- February 12: John Michael Higgins, American actor and comedian (voice of Mini-Max in Big Hero 6: The Series, Mentok the Mindtaker in Harvey Birdman, Attorney at Law, Riddler in Batman: The Brave and the Bold, Varrick in The Legend of Korra, Warren Stone in Rise of the Teenage Mutant Ninja Turtles).
- February 14:
  - John R. Dilworth, American animator (Doug, Gumby: The Movie, Sesame Street, A Little Curious), storyboard artist (Doug, Rugrats), writer, director and producer (creator of Courage the Cowardly Dog, founder of Stretch Films).
  - Enrico Colantoni, Canadian actor (voice of Felix Faust in Justice League Dark, Cyrus Bortel in Kim Possible, Glorious Godfrey in the Justice League episode "Eclipsed").
- February 15: Wallace Wolodarsky, American actor (voice of Kylie in Fantastic Mr. Fox), director, television producer (The Simpsons, The Oblongs) and screenwriter (The Simpsons, Monsters vs. Aliens, Trolls World Tour).
- February 17:
  - Michael Jordan, American businessman and former professional basketball player (portrayed himself in Space Jam).
  - Larry the Cable Guy, American actor, comedian, producer, country music artist and former radio personality (voice of Mater in the Cars franchise).
- February 20: Charles Barkley, American former professional basketball player (portrayed himself in Space Jam, voice of Rayburn Senior in Rumble, voiced himself in Clerks: The Animated Series, The Simpsons episode "The Great Phatsby", and the We Bare Bears episode "Baby Bears Can't Jump").
- February 21: William Baldwin, American actor (voice of Batman in Justice League: Crisis on Two Earths, Johnny 13 in Danny Phantom).

=== March ===
- March 11: Alex Kingston, English actress (voice of Quickshadow in Transformers: Rescue Bots, Vlurgen in the Penn Zero: Part-Time Hero episode "Mr. Rippen").
- March 14: Vic Kephart, American television producer (The Adventures of Teddy Ruxpin, ALF Tales) and production assistant (DIC Entertainment), (d. 1989).
- March 15: Ashley Lenz, American animator (Futurama, The Simpsons, The Princess and the Frog), storyboard artist (Time Squad, My Life as a Teenage Robot, Kim Possible, Teen Titans Go!, Puppy Dog Pals, The VeggieTales Show, The Harper House) and director (Futurama, Dan Vs.).
- March 17: Trish Burgio, American background artist (Warner Bros. Animation, DisneyToon Studios, Scooby-Doo, The New Woody Woodpecker Show, Curious George, Transformers: Rescue Bots, The Cleveland Show, Cats Don't Dance, Captain Planet and the Planeteers) and prop designer (Batman: The Animated Series, New Kids on the Block).
- March 18:
  - Vanessa Williams, American actress (voice of Mirabelle in Mama Mirabelle's Home Movies, Eileen Underwood in Milo Murphy's Law, Candace Beakman in T.O.T.S., Hisako in When Marnie Was There, Amanda Waller in Suicide Squad: Hell to Pay and Batman: Hush, Beauty in the Happily Ever After: Fairy Tales for Every Child episode "Beauty and the Beast", Debra in The Proud Family franchise).
  - Yoko Kanno, Japanese composer, arranger and music producer (Cowboy Bebop).
- March 19: Mary Scheer, American actress (voice of Suzie Kokoshka in Hey Arnold!, Alice in The Penguins of Madagascar, Sandra Danger in the Freakazoid! episode "Toby Danger in Doomsday Bet").
- March 20:
  - Kathy Ireland, American actress (voice of Crystal in Fantastic Four, Susan in Duckman, Sylvia in the King of the Hill episode "Peggy's Pageant Fever", Julia Hastings in the Totally Spies! episode "A Spy is Born").
  - David Thewlis, English actor (voice of Shame Wizard in Big Mouth, Lionel St. Swithens in Human Resources, Earthworm in James and the Giant Peach, British Father in the Family Guy episode "Chap Stewie").
- March 23: Emmanuel Karsen, French actor (French dub voice of Duke Weaselton in Zootopia, Human Torch in Fantastic Four, Pete in The Mask: Animated Series, Raven in Gargoyles, Ryuk in Death Note, Kizaru in One Piece, Ginyu in Dragon Ball Z Kai, Stewie Griffin in Family Guy), (d. 2025).

=== April ===
- April 1: John McIntyre, American animator, writer, director, and storyboard artist (Cartoon Network Studios).
- April 2: Tim Hodge, American voice actor (voice of MacTavish in John Henry, various characters in VeggieTales), animator (Walt Disney Animation Studios), storyboard artist (Walt Disney Animation Studios, Superbook, Warner Bros. Animation, The Hero of Color City, Bunyan and Babe, Animal Crackers, Dragons: Rescue Riders), writer, director and producer (VeggieTales, 3-2-1 Penguins!).
- April 4:
  - Igor Khait, American animator and film producer (Bebe's Kids, Walt Disney Company), (d. 2016).
  - Graham Norton, Irish comedian, actor, author, and television host (voice of Moonwind in Soul).
- April 6: Clark Spencer, American film producer, businessman and studio executive (Walt Disney Animation Studios).
- April 15: Paula Pell, American writer, actress, comedian, and producer (voice of Dream Director and Mom's Anger in the Inside Out franchise, Gadget Gal in The Awesomes, Barbara Glouberman, Lola's Couch Pillow, and Bubbe in Big Mouth, Ruth and Lenore in Bless the Harts).
- April 18:
  - Conan O'Brien, American television host, comedian, actor (voice of various characters in Robot Chicken, Riddler in The Lego Batman Movie, Clarence and Chuck in Final Space, Glaxxon 3000 in The Mitchells vs. the Machines, David Endocrine in Batman: The Dark Knight Returns, Chip in the O'Grady episode "Frenched", Santa Claus in The Backyardigans episode "The Action Elves Save Christmas Eve", Kuchikukan in The Penguins of Madagascar episode "Operation: Lunacorn Apocalypse", himself in The Simpsons episode "Bart Gets Famous", the Dr. Katz, Professional Therapist episodes "Chopper" and "Lerapy", the Futurama episode "Xmas Story", and the Family Guy episode "Into Harmony's Way"), television writer and producer (The Simpsons, Final Space).
  - Eric McCormack, Canadian actor (voice of Lucky in Pound Puppies).
- April 20: Christopher Nielsen, Norwegian comic artist, cartoonist, animator and director.
- April 21: Brian Goldner, American business chief executive and film producer (CEO of Hasbro from 2008 to 2021), (d. 2021).

=== May ===
- May 2: Yoram Yosefsberg, Israeli actor (dub voice of Gantu in the Lilo & Stitch franchise, Diego in the Ice Age franchise, Major Monogram and Ferb Fletcher in Phineas and Ferb, Vilgax and Diamondhead in the Ben 10 franchise, Cookie in Atlantis: The Lost Empire, Warp Darkmatter in Buzz Lightyear of Star Command, Earl Devereaux in the Cloudy with a Chance of Meatballs franchise, Duff Killigan and James Possible in Kim Possible, Killer Croc in Batman: The Animated Series, Bobo Haha in Generator Rex, various characters in Batman: The Brave and the Bold).
- May 3: Jay Kogen, American actor, director, television writer and producer (The Simpsons).
- May 4: Marc Wilmore, American television writer (The Simpsons, The PJs, F Is for Family), producer, actor, and comedian (voice of Psychologist and the Narrator in The Simpsons episodes "It's a Mad, Mad, Mad, Mad Marge" and "The Wreck of the Relationship", Walter Burkett in The PJs, Teddy Morewill in F Is for Family, additional voices in Teacher's Pet), (d. 2021).
- May 8: Stephen Furst, American actor (voice of Fanboy in Freakazoid!, Sport in Road Rovers, Hathi in Jungle Cubs, Dash in The Little Mermaid II: Return to the Sea, Booster in Buzz Lightyear of Star Command, Male Warthog in the Timon & Pumbaa episode "Home Is Where the Hog Is"), (d. 2017).
- May 9: Michael Lindsay, American voice actor (voice of Kisuke Urahara in Bleach, Shinichiro Tamaki in Code Geass), (d. 2019).
- May 10: Rich Moore, American screenwriter, director (The Simpsons, The Critic, Futurama, Baby Blues, Drawn Together, Walt Disney Animation Studios) and actor.
- May 20:
  - Darian Sahanaja, American singer, songwriter and composer (Disney Television Animation).
  - Paul Haddad, Canadian actor (voice of Uncle Arthur in Babar, Quicksilver and Arkon in X-Men: The Animated Series, Lefty in John Callahan's Quads!, Willy Stop in Rescue Heroes), (d. 2020).
- May 21: Richard Appel, American television writer and producer (The Simpsons, King of the Hill, Family Guy, American Dad!, The Cleveland Show).
- May 22: Cosgrove Vincent Norstadt, American talent coordinator (Futurama, Olive, the Other Reindeer, The Ant Bully) and casting associate (Futurama).
- May 25: Mike Myers, Canadian actor, comedian, director, producer and screenwriter (voice of the title character in the Shrek franchise).

=== June ===
- June 6: Jason Isaacs, English actor (voice of Dick Dastardly in Scoob!, Zhao in Avatar: The Last Airbender, the Grand Inquisitor in the Star Wars franchise, the Judge in Castlevania, the Emperor in The Dark Crystal: Age of Resistance, Siddeley and Lelend Turbo in Cars 2, Ra's al Ghul in Batman: Under the Red Hood, Sinestro in Green Lantern: Emerald Knights, Lex Luthor in Justice League: Gods and Monsters, Superman in Superman: Red Son).
- June 9: Johnny Depp, American actor (voice of Victor Van Dort in Corpse Bride, the title character in Rango, Jack Kahuna Laguna in the SpongeBob SquarePants episode "SpongeBob SquarePants vs. The Big One", Johnny Puffins in Puffins).
- June 10: Jeanne Tripplehorn, American actress (voice of Hope Chatsworth in Electric City, Joan Tripplehorn in the BoJack Horseman episode "A Horse Walks into a Rehab").
- June 11: Britta Phillips, American musician and actress (singing voice of the title character in Jem).
- June 13: Greg Daniels, American director, television writer and producer (The Simpsons, co-creator of King of the Hill).
- June 15: Helen Hunt, American actress and director (voice of Rava in Galtar and the Golden Lance, Mary and Jerusalem Woman #1 in The Greatest Adventure: Stories from the Bible, Jess in Jock the Hero Dog, Renee in The Simpsons episode "Dumbbell Indemnity", additional voices in Mork & Mindy/Laverne & Shirley/Fonz Hour, Captain Planet and the Planeteers, The Adventures of Don Coyote and Sancho Panda and Capitol Critters).
- June 17: Greg Kinnear, American actor (voice of Phineas Ratchet in Robots, Greg Kinglear in the BoJack Horseman episode "Start Spreading the News").
- June 19: Saverio Indrio, Italian voice actor (Italian dub voice of Damien Drake in Looney Tunes: Back in Action, James P. Sullivan in the Monsters, Inc. franchise, King Neptune in The SpongeBob SquarePants Movie, Jackson in Bee Movie, Senator in Space Chimps, Noctus in Legend of the Guardians: The Owls of Ga'Hoole, Race Bannon in Tom and Jerry: Spy Quest, Picadilly in Curious George 2: Follow That Monkey!, Chuck Berost in The Looney Tunes Show, Steve Barkin in Kim Possible, Hak Foo in Jackie Chan Adventures, Baileywick in Sofia the First, Admiral Zhao in Avatar: The Last Airbender, Mysterio in Spider-Man: The Animated Series, Charles in Eureka Seven, Dark Kat in SWAT Kats: The Radical Squadron, Pug in 101 Dalmatians: The Series, Rat King in Teenage Mutant Ninja Turtles, Ra in Samurai Jack, Zombozo in Ben 10, Nick Fury in The Avengers: Earth's Mightiest Heroes, Dicko in Love, Death & Robots, Takeshi Oii in Death Note, Man-At-Arms in Masters of the Universe, King Randor in He-Man and the Masters of the Universe), (d. 2025).
- June 20: Hiroshi Ōsaka, Japanese animator, film director and producer, character designer and illustrator (Bones Animation Studio), (d. 2007).
- June 21: Jan Pinkava, Czech-British-American producer, director, writer, and animator (Pixar).
- June 22: Rob Edwards, American screenwriter and producer (Treasure Planet, The Princess and the Frog, Sneaks).

=== July ===
- July 4: Georgina Lightning, Canadian director and actress (voice of Morning Dove in the Happily Ever After: Fairy Tales for Every Child episode "Snow White", provided additional voices for Pocahontas II: Journey to a New World and Spirit: Stallion of the Cimarron), (d. 2026).
- July 8: Rocky Carroll, American actor (voice of Silas Stone and Perry White in the DC Animated Movie Universe, Derek Maza and Talon in Gargoyles).
- July 13: Sandy Fox, American voice actress (voice of Sailor Chibi Moon in the Sailor Moon franchise, Myu-Myu in Serial Experiments Lain, Rin in Fist of the North Star, Sandee Heap in Klutter!, Mipsy Mipson in As Told by Ginger, Tracy, Snuffy, Lady Stacy and Prince Duffy in Jay Jay the Jet Plane, Lily and Penny in LeapFrog, Harmony in Hi Hi Puffy AmiYumi, Roarr in Miraculous: Tales of Ladybug & Cat Noir, Kricketina Kylie and Jacqueline in Pokémon Master Journeys: The Series, continued voice of Betty Boop).
- July 24: Karl Malone, American former professional basketball player (voiced himself in the Static Shock episode "Hoop Squad").
- July 30:
  - Marty Isenberg, American television writer (Danny Phantom, Ben 10, Transformers: Animated, Kaijudo: Rise of the Duel Masters, Guardians of the Galaxy).
  - Lisa Kudrow, American actress, comedian, writer and producer (voice of Foo-Lin in Father of the Pride, Wanda Pierce in BoJack Horseman, Lucille in El Americano: The Movie, Janice Templeton in The Boss Baby franchise, Honey in HouseBroken, Aphrodite in Hercules, the Ghost of Christmas Past in the American Dad! episode "The Best Christmas Story Never Told", Sheila in the Allen Gregory episode "Mom Sizemore", Female Beta Maxians in the Duckman episode "The One with Lisa Kudrow in a Small Role", Alex Whitney in The Simpsons episode "Lard of the Dance", Amy Pittman in the King of the Hill episode "The Exterminator").

=== August ===
- August 1: Coolio, American rapper, record producer and actor (voice of Kwanzaabot in Futurama, Marvin Roper/Replikon in the Static Shock episode "Duped", Wax Coolio in the Gravity Falls episode "Headhunters", himself in the Duckman episode "Coolio Runnings"), (d. 2022).
- August 3: James Hetfield, American musician and member of Metallica (voice of Wolfgang in Skylanders Academy, Dragon #1 in the Dave the Barbarian episode "Here There Be Dragons", Walter Polo Coach in the American Dad! episode "The Life Aquatic with Steve Smith", himself in The Simpsons episode "The Mook, the Chef, the Wife and Her Homer").
- August 5: Mark Strong, English actor (voice of Ordon in The Dark Crystal: Age of Resistance, Pod in the UK dub of Arrietty).
- August 7: Harold Perrineau, American actor (voice of Blade in Marvel Anime, Louis Wyler / Turbo Jet in the Spider-Man: The New Animated Series episode "Heroes and Villains", additional voices in the Phineas and Ferb episode "Where's Perry?").
- August 8:
  - Emi Shinohara, Japanese voice actress (voice of Sailor Jupiter in Sailor Moon, Biko "B.K." Daitokuji in Project A-Ko, Kekko Kamen in Kekko Kamen, Maria Pia Armonia in Mobile Suit V Gundam, Kagero in Ninja Scroll, Fuaru Presea in Magic Knight Rayearth, Ruby in Burn-Up Excess, Yayoi Matsugana in Nightwalker: The Midnight Detective, Kaho Mizuki in Cardcaptor Sakura, Charlotte in Vampire Hunter D: Bloodlust, Agent L in Dragon Drive, Angel in The Big O, Motoko Hara in Gunparade March, Xia Yu Fan in Full Metal Panic!, Oiran Uneshino in Ghost Slayers Ayashi, Shizuko Aoki in Smile PreCure!, Japanese dub voice of Penelope Pussycat in the Looney Tunes franchise, Perdita in 101 Dalmatians: The Series, Francine Langstrom in Batman: The Animated Series, Rita in Animaniacs, Lurleen Lumpkin in The Simpsons, Polaris in X-Men: The Animated Series), (d. 2024).
  - Rika Fukami, Japanese actress (voice of Sailor Venus in Sailor Moon, Regine in Futari wa Pretty Cure, dub voice of Foxy Loxy in Chicken Little, Valka in the How to Train Your Dragon franchise, and Opal in PB&J Otter).
- August 10: Brian Scully, American television writer and producer (The Simpsons, Family Guy).
- August 15: Hitoshi Okuda, Japanese manga artist (Tenchi Muyo!).
- August 16: Christine Cavanaugh, American voice actress (voice of Gosalyn Mallard in Darkwing Duck, Chuckie Finster in Rugrats, Bunnie Rabbot in Sonic the Hedgehog, Oblina in Aaahh!!! Real Monsters, Dexter in Dexter's Laboratory), (d. 2014).
- August 19: John Stamos, American actor and musician (voice of Iron Man in Spidey and His Amazing Friends, Captain Salty Bones in Mickey Mouse Funhouse, Meap in the Phineas and Ferb episode "Meap Me in St. Louis", himself in the Clone High episode "Changes: The Big Prom: The Sex Romp: The Season Finale").
- August 24: Kirk Wise, American film director, animator and screenwriter (Walt Disney Animation Studios).
- August 25: Brianne Siddall, American actress (voice of various characters in the Digimon franchise, 1950s Robin in The New Batman Adventures episode "Legends of the Dark Knight").
- August 30: Michael Chiklis, American actor (voice of Zeus in DuckTales, Deathstroke in Deathstroke: Knights & Dragons, Colonel Charles Tarrington in the Godzilla: The Series episode "Where Is Thy Sting?").

=== September ===
- September 11: Joey Dedio, American actor (voice of Wheeler in Captain Planet and the Planeteers, Daniel LaRusso in The Karate Kid, additional voices in the Extreme Ghostbusters episode "Rage").
- September 17: James Urbaniak, American actor (voice of Dr. Venture, Phantom Limb and Jonas Venture Jr. in The Venture Bros., Mr. Logic and Jeff the Shaolin Monk in OK K.O.! Let's Be Heroes, Ebony Maw in Guardians of the Galaxy).
- September 18:
  - Dan Povenmire, American animator (The Simpsons, The Critic), storyboard artist (Teenage Mutant Ninja Turtles, James Bond Jr., Nickelodeon Animation Studio, Earthworm Jim, The Simpsons, Family Guy), writer (Nickelodeon Animation Studio), director (Hey Arnold!, Family Guy, Looney Tunes), producer (Scoob!) and voice actor (creator of Hamster & Gretel, co-creator and voice of Dr. Doofenshmirtz in Phineas and Ferb and Milo Murphy's Law).
  - John Powell, English composer (DreamWorks Animation).
- September 25: Tate Donovan, American actor (voice of Hercules in the Hercules franchise and House of Mouse, Gobu in The Legend of Tarzan episode "Tarzan and the Enemy Within").
- September 27: Marc Maron, American actor and comedian (voice of Mr. Snake in The Bad Guys, Lex Luthor in DC League of Super-Pets, Magnus Hammersmith in Metalocalypse, Randl in Harvey Beaks, himself in The Simpsons episode "The Clown Stays in the Picture").
- September 28: Greg Weisman, American film and television producer (Disney Television Animation, DC Comics).

=== October ===
- October 6: Elisabeth Shue, American actress (voice of Lacey Sole in the American Dad! episode "Less Money, Mo' Problems", Madelyn Stillwell in The Boys Presents: Diabolical episode "One Plus One Equals Two").
- October 9: Ingrid Oliu, American actress (voice of Renee Montoya in Batman: The Animated Series).
- October 10: Alan Smart, American retired animator (The Chipmunk Adventure, Oliver & Company, The Little Mermaid, Box-Office Bunny, The Simpsons), sheet timer (Nickelodeon Animation Studio, Duckman, Disney Television Animation) and director (The Simpsons, The Critic, Nickelodeon Animation Studio, Nightmare Ned, Clone High).
- October 12: Satoshi Kon, Japanese manga artist and animator (Perfect Blue, Millennium Actress, Tokyo Godfathers, Paranoia Agent, Paprika), (d. 2010).
- October 13: Hiro Kanagawa, Japanese-Canadian actor (voice of Mister Fantastic in Fantastic Four: World's Greatest Heroes, Mr. Tanaka in Team Zenko Go).
- October 14: Lori Petty, American actress (voice of Livewire in the DC Animated Universe, Ms. Pinch in the Summer Camp Island episode "I Heart Heartforde", Geraldine Grundy and Anna Jones in the Robot Chicken episode "Never Forget", Nightra in the Transformers: Robots in Disguise episode "Guilty as Charged").
- October 15: Ennio Torresan, Jr., Brazilian-born American animator (Cats Don't Dance), storyboard artist (Spicy City, Todd McFarlane's Spawn, SpongeBob SquarePants, Teacher's Pet, DreamWorks Animation), background artist (An American Tail: Fievel Goes West, We're Back! A Dinosaur's Story, The Ren & Stimpy Show, Spicy City), consultant (My Big Big Friend), writer (SpongeBob SquarePants) and director (Spicy City, Teacher's Pet, Spirit Untamed).
- October 26: Tom Cavanagh, Canadian actor (voice of Eobard Thawne and Harrison Wells in the Robot Chicken episode "Ants on a Hamburger", Director in the American Dad! episode "Twinanigans").
- October 28: Lauren Holly, American-Canadian actress (voice of Yūko Ogino in Spirited Away, Haulie in The Adventures of Chuck and Friends).
- October 31:
  - Sanjeev Bhaskar, English actor and comedian (voice of Rupee in Jackboots on Whitehall, Lead Elf in Arthur Christmas, Ethan Sullivan in Thunderbirds Are Go, Shankar in Thomas & Friends).
  - Dermot Mulroney, American actor (voice of Green Lantern in The Batman, Rod in Hair High).

=== November ===
- November 2: Jay Goede, American actor (voice of Mewtwo in Pokémon: The First Movie).
- November 7: Darin De Paul, American voice actor (voice of Stonefell in The Legend of Vox Machina, Bog in Amphibia, Bular in Wizards: Tales of Arcadia, Zeron Alpha in 3Below: Tales of Arcadia, Yuri in We Bare Bears, Scarlet Panther in The Adventures of Puss in Boots, Sinestro in the Justice League Action episode "The Ringer").
- November 10:
  - Hugh Bonneville, English actor (voice of Santa Claus in the DuckTales episode "How Santa Stole Christmas!", Wigbert Ribbiton in the Amphibia episode "Swamp and Sensibility").
  - Sylvain Chomet, French comic writer, animator and film director (The Old Lady and the Pigeons, The Triplets of Belleville, The Illusionist).
- November 20: Ming-Na Wen, American actress (voice of Mulan in Mulan, Mulan II, the House of Mouse episode "Salute to Sports", the Sofia the First episode "Princesses to the Rescue", and Ralph Breaks the Internet, Ellen Yin in The Batman, Aki Ross in Final Fantasy: The Spirits Within, Dr. Hirano in Phineas and Ferb, Finn's Mom in Adventure Time, Fennec Shand in Star Wars: The Bad Batch, Fong Wing in Gremlins: Secrets of the Mogwai).
- November 21: Nicollette Sheridan, English actress (voice of Eleanor in the Tarzan franchise, Darci Mason in the Static Shock episode "Toys in the Hood").
- November 26: Kevin Kocvar, Canadian film editor (Toad Patrol, Toot & Puddle, Jimmy Two-Shoes, Stella and Sam, Camp Lakebottom, Atomic Puppet, If You Give a Mouse a Cookie, Hilda), (d. 2020).
- November 29: Debi Mae West, American actress (voice of Tsunade in Naruto, Lucky in 101 Dalmatians: The Series, Kat Ryan in Max Steel, Mrs. Brisby in The Secret of NIMH 2: Timmy to the Rescue).

=== December ===
- December 14: Cynthia Gibb, American actress (voice of Millicante in The Legend of Prince Valiant, Trish Mills in the Superman: The Animated Series episode "Prototype").
- December 15:
  - Norman J. Grossfeld, American director, television producer, record producer, screenwriter and media executive (4Kids Entertainment).
  - Helen Slater, American actress and singer-songwriter (voice of Talia al Ghul in Batman: The Animated Series, Martha Kent in DC Super Hero Girls).
- December 16:
  - Benjamin Bratt, American actor and producer (voice of Manny in Cloudy with a Chance of Meatballs and Cloudy with a Chance of Meatballs 2, El Macho in Despicable Me 2, Ernesto de la Cruz in Coco, Superman in Justice League: Gods and Monsters).
  - James Mangold, American filmmaker (Oliver & Company, Claymation Easter).
- December 18: Brad Pitt, American actor and film producer (portrayed and voiced Frank Harris in Cool World, voice of Metro Man in Megamind, Will the Krill in Happy Feet Two, Sinbad in Sinbad: Legend of the Seven Seas).
- December 19: Jennifer Beals, American actress (voice of Yum-Yum in Arabian Knight).
- December 20:
  - Iqbal Theba, Pakistani actor (voice of Slav in Voltron: Legendary Defender, Gupta in Mira, Royal Detective, Swami in the Jeff & Some Aliens episode "Jeff & Some Jeffs", Dr. Bhudamanjur in the King of the Hill episode "Next of Shin").
  - Audu Paden, American animator, character designer (Spider-Man: The New Animated Series, Monster High: Fright On!), storyboard artist (Warner Bros. Animation, The Simpsons, Adventures from the Book of Virtues), art director, voice director, writer, director (Animaniacs, Pinky and the Brain, Adelaide Productions, Tak and the Power of Juju, Mattel Television, High Guardian Spice) and producer (Adelaide Productions, Tak and the Power of Juju, Mattel Television, Hot Wheels Battle Force 5).
- December 23: Jess Harnell, American actor (voice of Wakko Warner in Animaniacs, Hunter in Road Rovers, Chilly in Doc McStuffins, Texas in Motorcity, Secret Squirrel in 2 Stupid Dogs, Cedric in Sofia the First, Grim Gloom in The 7D, Odin, Hercules, Heimdall, and Crimson Dynamo in The Super Hero Squad Show, Do-Wah Diddy in Butt-Ugly Martians, Gnome in The Powerpuff Girls episode "See Me, Feel Me, Gnomey", Bus Beetle in A Bug's Life, Nurse AJ in Up, and original voice of Jerry in Totally Spies).
- December 29: Greg Fideler, American television writer (This Just In!, The Fairly OddParents).

=== Specific date unknown ===
- Adam I. Lapidus, American television writer and producer (The Simpsons, Tripping the Rift, Xiaolin Showdown).
- Duncan Watson, American former child actor (voice of Charlie Brown in Be My Valentine, Charlie Brown, You're a Good Sport, Charlie Brown and Race for Your Life, Charlie Brown).
- Kevyn Wallace, American animator (Rocko's Modern Life), background artist (Freakazoid!, The Proud Family Movie, The Simpsons Movie) and layout artist (Bebe's Kids, Earthworm Jim, Walt Disney Animation Studios), (d. 2011).
- Chris Duncan, American background artist, visual effects artist and designer (Warner Bros. Animation, Nickelodeon Animation Studio), (d. 2021).
- Circus-Szalewski, American actor (voice of Snooty Clerk and Mean Toymaker in Hoops & Yoyo Ruin Christmas).
- Amanda Forbis, Canadian animator.
- Steve Williams, Canadian special effects artist, animator, and film and commercials director (The Wild).
- Tabitha St. Germain, Canadian actress (voice of Rarity, Princess Luna, Derpy Hooves, and Granny Smith in My Little Pony: Friendship Is Magic, Pepper Clark in Littlest Pet Shop, Kootie Pie Koopa in The Adventures of Super Mario Bros. 3 and Super Mario World, the title character in Scary Godmother: Halloween Spooktakular and Scary Godmother: The Revenge of Jimmy, Kitty in Dog City, Spryte in The Legend of Zelda, Hilda Spellman in Sabrina: Secrets of a Teenage Witch, Alexis in Transformers: Armada and Transformers: Energon, Martha in Martha Speaks, Flay Allster in Mobile Suit Gundam SEED, Roberta in Black Lagoon, original voice of Nazz in Ed, Edd n Eddy).

== Deaths ==
=== January ===
- January 31: Angel Espoy, Spanish-American painter (worked in the animation industry of San Francisco, staff member of the Animated Film Corporation), dies at age 83.

=== April ===
- April 9: Vernon Stallings, American animator, writer and director (International Film Service, Bray Productions, Van Beuren Studios, Walt Disney Company), dies at age 71.

=== September ===
- September 15: Oliver Wallace, English-American composer (Walt Disney Company), dies at age 76.

=== December ===
- December 1: Carl Koch, German art historian, film director, and writer (The Adventures of Prince Achmed), dies at age 71.

== See also ==
- 1963 in anime
