= 1963 in anime =

- Years in anime: 1960 1961 1962 1963 1964 1965 1966
- Centuries: 19th century · 20th century · 21st century
- Decades: 1930s 1940s 1950s 1960s 1970s 1980s 1990s
- Years: 1960 1961 1962 1963 1964 1965 1966

The events of 1963 in anime.

== Events ==
In March, NBC Enterprises announced that it would begin syndicating 52 episodes of Astro Boy in the United States. The series would begin airing in September, and the English adaptation would be headed by Fred Ladd.

== Accolades ==
- Ōfuji Noburō Award: Wanpaku Ōji no Orochi Taiji

== Releases ==
English name	Japanese name	Type	Demographic	Regions
Astro Boy	鉄腕アトム (Tetsuwan Atomu)	TV	Shōnen	JA, NA
Gigantor	鉄人28号 (Tetsujin Nijūhachi-gō)	TV	Shōnen	JA, NA
8th Man	エイトマン (Eitoman)	TV	Shōnen	JA
Wolf Boy Ken	狼少年ケン (Ōkami Shōnen Ken)	TV	Children	JA
Doggie March	わんわん忠臣蔵 (Wanwan Chūshingura)	Movie	Family, Children	JA, EU
Prince Shisukon	シスコン王子 (Shisukon Ouji)	TV	Shōnen	JA
Hermit Village	仙人部落 (Sennin Buraku)	TV	Seinen	JA
The Little Prince and the Eight-Headed Dragon	わんぱく王子の大蛇退治 (Wanpaku Ōji no Orochi Taiji)	Movie	Family, Children	JA

== See also ==
- 1963 in animation
