= 1961 in anime =

- Years in anime: 1958 1959 1960 1961 1962 1963 1964
- Centuries: 19th century · 20th century · 21st century
- Decades: 1930s 1940s 1950s 1960s 1970s 1980s 1990s
- Years: 1958 1959 1960 1961 1962 1963 1964

The events of 1961 in anime.

== Releases ==
English name	Japanese name	Type	Demographic	Regions
Fantasia of Stamps	切手の幻想 (Kitte no Gensō)	Short	General	JA
Instant History	インスタントヒストリー	TV	General	JA
The Littlest Warrior	安寿と厨子王丸 (Anju to Zushiômaru)	Movie	Family, Children	JA

== Births ==
- July 19 - Noriyuki Abe, director, storyboard artist, sound director
- October 4 - Kazuki Takahashi, Japanese manga artist and creator of Yu-Gi-Oh!
- November 21 - Takami Akai, character designer, animator

== Deaths ==
- July 28: Noburō Ōfuji, Japanese director and animator dies at age 61.

== See also ==
- 1961 in animation
