= 1966 in animation =

Events in 1966 in animation.

== Events ==
=== January ===
- January 1: Robert McKimson's Speedy Gonzales and Daffy Duck cartoon The Astroduck premieres, produced by DePatie–Freleng Enterprises.
- January 8: Rudy Larriva's Wile E. Coyote and Road Runner cartoon Shot and Bothered premieres, produced by DePatie–Freleng Enterprises.
- January 3: The first episode of Camberwick Green is broadcast.
- January 15: Chuck Jones' Tom and Jerry cartoon Duel Personality premieres.
- January 29: Rudy Larriva's Wile E. Coyote and Road Runner cartoon Out and Out Rout premieres, produced by DePatie–Freleng Enterprises.

=== February ===
- February 4: Winnie the Pooh and the Honey Tree, produced by the Walt Disney Company, is first released. This marks the debut of A.A. Milne's literary character Winnie-the-Pooh as an animated franchise.
- February 5: Robert McKimson's Speedy Gonzales and Daffy Duck cartoon Mucho Locos premieres, produced by DePatie–Freleng Enterprises.
- February 17: Chuck Jones' Tom and Jerry cartoon Jerry, Jerry, Quite Contrary premieres.
- February 19: Rudy Larriva's Wile E. Coyote and Road Runner cartoon The Solid Tin Coyote premieres, produced by DePatie–Freleng Enterprises.
- February 26: Robert McKimson's Speedy Gonzales and Daffy Duck cartoon Mexican Mousepiece premieres, produced by DePatie–Freleng Enterprises.

=== March ===
- March 3: Abe Levitow's Tom and Jerry cartoon Jerry-Go-Round premieres, was produced by Chuck Jones.
- March 12: Rudy Larriva's Wile E. Coyote and Road Runner cartoon Clippety Clobbered premieres, produced by DePatie–Freleng Enterprises.
- March 26: Robert McKimson's Speedy Gonzales and Daffy Duck cartoon Daffy Rents premieres, produced by DePatie–Freleng Enterprises.

=== April ===
- April 1: The final episode of Hanna-Barbera's The Flintstones is broadcast, making it the longest-running primetime animated TV series until The Simpsons broke its record in 1997.
- April 16: Robert McKimson's cartoon A-Haunting We Will Go; starring Speedy Gonzales, Daffy Duck, & Witch Hazel, premieres. Was produced by DePatie–Freleng Enterprises. This was Hazel's final appearance in the Golden Age of Animation.
- April 18: 38th Academy Awards: Chuck Jones' The Dot and the Line wins the Academy Award for Best Animated Short.
- April 21: The first episode of Batfink is broadcast.
- April 28: Chuck Jones and Ben Washam's Tom and Jerry cartoon Love Me, Love My Mouse premieres.

=== May ===
- May 5: Abe Levitow's Tom and Jerry cartoon Puss 'n' Boats premieres, was produced by Chuck Jones.
- May 21: Robert McKimson's Speedy Gonzales and Daffy Duck cartoon Snow Excuse premieres, produced by DePatie–Freleng Enterprises.

=== June ===
- June 8: The second Peanuts TV special Charlie Brown's All Stars! premieres on CBS.
- June 30: Abe Levitow's Tom and Jerry cartoon Filet Meow premieres, was produced by Chuck Jones.

=== July ===
- July 14: The Tom and Jerry cartoon Matinee Mouse, directed by Tom Ray & produced by Chuck Jones, premieres. The short features footage from William Hanna & Joseph Barbera's following Tom and Jerry cartoons: The Flying Cat, Professor Tom, The Missing Mouse, Jerry and the Lion, Love That Pup, The Flying Sorceress, Jerry's Diary, & The Truce Hurts.
- July 19: Robert McKimson's Speedy Gonzales and Daffy Duck cartoon A Squeak in the Deep premieres, produced by DePatie–Freleng Enterprises.

=== August ===
- August 3: The film The Man Called Flintstone is first released, a feature film adaptation of The Flintstones.
- August 4: Abe Levitow's Tom and Jerry cartoon The A-Tom-inable Snowman premieres, was produced by Chuck Jones.
- August 20: Robert McKimson's Speedy Gonzales and Daffy Duck cartoon Feather Finger premieres, produced by DePatie–Freleng Enterprises.

=== September ===
- September 8: Abe Levitow's Tom and Jerry cartoon Catty-Cornered premieres, was produced by Chuck Jones.
- September 10:
  - The first episode of Laurel and Hardy is broadcast, based on the comedy duo Laurel and Hardy.
  - The first episode of Space Ghost, produced by Hanna-Barbera, is broadcast.
  - The first episode of The New Adventures of Superman is broadcast.
  - The Road Runner Show premieres on CBS.
- September 17: Robert McKimson's Speedy Gonzales and Daffy Duck cartoon Swing Ding Amigo premieres, produced by DePatie–Freleng Enterprises.

=== October ===
- October 9: The first episode of Rocket Robin Hood is broadcast.
- October 27: It's the Great Pumpkin, Charlie Brown premieres on CBS.
- October 29: The first episode of The Mighty Heroes is broadcast.

=== November ===
- November 5: The Wile E. Coyote and Road Runner cartoon Sugar and Spies premieres, it marks the final appearance of Wile E. Coyote and the Road Runner in the Golden Age of American Animation.

=== December ===
- December 3: Robert McKimson's Speedy Gonzales and Daffy Duck cartoon A Taste of Catnip premieres, produced by DePatie–Freleng Enterprises. Sylvester makes a cameo in this short, His final appearance in the golden age of animation.
- December 5: The first episode of Sally the Witch is broadcast.
- December 15: Walt Disney dies while producing The Jungle Book, the last animated feature made under his personal supervision.
- December 17: The Underdog episodes "A New Villain, Parts 3 and 4" air, which mark two of the proclaimed episodes where Underdog dies and resurrects.
- December 18: Chuck Jones' How the Grinch Stole Christmas, an animated Christmas TV special, premieres and will become a holiday classic. It is an adaptation of Dr. Seuss' eponymous children's novel .

=== Specific date unknown ===
- Karel Zeman's The Stolen Airship premieres.

== Films released ==
- January 1 - Go There, Don't Know Where (Soviet Union)
- February 5 - Alice of Wonderland in Paris (United States and Czechoslovakia)
- March 30 - Alice in Wonderland or What's a Nice Kid Like You Doing in a Place Like This? (United States)
- June 1 - The Daydreamer (United States and Japan)
- July 21 - Cyborg 009 (Japan)
- July 31 - Jungle Emperor Leo (Japan)
- August 3 - The Man Called Flintstone (United States)
- November 24 - The Ballad of Smokey the Bear (United States and Japan)
- December 16 - The Dream Wizard (Spain)
- December 18 - How the Grinch Stole Christmas! (United States)
- December 23 - Filippo the Cat: License to Record (Italy)
- December 31 - King of the World: The King Kong Show (Japan)

== Television series ==
- January 3 - Camberwick Green debuts on BBC1.
- February 5 - Osomatsu-kun debuts on MBS.
- March 7 - Marude Dameo debuts on Nippon TV.
- April 21 - Batfink debuts on KTLA and in syndication.
- May 2 - Kaizoku Ôji debuts on TV Asahi.
- May 5 - Harris no Kaze debuts on Fuji TV.
- June 3 - Yûsei Kamen debuts on Fuji TV.
- July 1 - Monoshiri Daigaku Ashita No Calendar debuts on Fuji TV.
- September 1 - The Marvel Super Heroes debuts in syndication.
- September 10:
  - The Road Runner Show and The Beagles debut on CBS and ABC.
  - Frankenstein Jr. and the Impossibles, The Lone Ranger, The New Adventures of Superman, Go Go Gophers, Space Ghost, and Superboy debut on CBS.
  - Cool McCool, Laurel and Hardy, Space Kidettes, and The Super 6 debut on NBC.
  - The King Kong Show debuts on ABC and NET (now TV Asahi).
- October 1 - Robotan debuts on Fuji TV.
- October 5 - Leo the Lion debuts on Fuji TV.
- October 6 - Ganbare! Marine Kid debuts on TBS.
- October 9 - Rocket Robin Hood debuts on CBC.
- October 29:
  - Bamse debuts on SVT.
  - Mighty Heroes debuts on CBS.
- November 14 - Tobidase! Bacchiri debuts on Nippon TV.
- December 5 - Sally the Witch debuts on TV Asahi.
- Specific date unknown:
  - Arthur! And the Square Knights of the Round Table debuts on ABC.
  - Klondike Kat debuts on CBS.

== Births ==
=== January ===
- January 5: Yuri Amano, Japanese actress (voice of Kiyone Makibi in the Tenchi Muyo! franchise, Asako Nakamura in Ushio and Tora, Keiko Yukimura in YuYu Hakusho, Alcyone in Magic Knight Rayearth, Lorelei in Saber Marionette J).
- January 6: Danik Thomas, American film editor (Futurama, Kid Notorious, Curious George, Barnyard, Shrek Forever After, Smurfs: The Lost Village) and production assistant (Universal Cartoon Studios).
- January 13: Patrick Dempsey, American actor (voice of Kenai in Brother Bear 2, The Plant in The Super Mario Bros. Super Show! episode "Super Plant").
- January 14: Dan Schneider, American television producer, screenwriter and actor (creator of The Adventures of Kid Danger).
- January 18:
  - Stephen DeStefano, American comic book artist, animator (Runaway Brain, Kid Cosmic, Hotel Transylvania: Transformania), storyboard artist (Universal Cartoon Studios, Nickelodeon Animation Studio, Warner Bros. Animation, Courage the Cowardly Dog, Cartoon Network Studios, Poochini, The Venture Bros., Minoriteam, Drawn Together, Futurama, Kick Buttowski: Suburban Daredevil, The Avengers: Earth's Mightiest Heroes, DreamWorks Dragons), character designer (Beethoven, The Venture Bros., Cartoon Network Studios, Mickey Mouse, Hotel Transylvania 2, Rise of the Teenage Mutant Ninja Turtles, The Mighty Ones, Looney Tunes Cartoons, Kid Cosmic, DC Super Hero Girls), background artist (The Ren & Stimpy Show, Superman: The Animated Series), art director (The Venture Bros.) and writer (The Ren & Stimpy Show, The Twisted Tales of Felix the Cat, The Grim Adventures of Billy & Mandy, Batman: The Brave and the Bold).
  - Stevie Wermers, American story artist and director (Walt Disney Animation Studios).
- January 20: Rainn Wilson, American actor, comedian, producer, and writer (voice of Gallaxhar in Monsters vs. Aliens, Lex Luthor in the DC Animated Movie Universe, Gargamel in Smurfs: The Lost Village).
- January 29: Julie Ann Taylor, American voice actress (voice of Milly Ashford in Code Geass).

=== February ===
- February 1: Brett Varon, American animator, storyboard artist (The Itsy Bitsy Spider, Dexter's Laboratory, Oh Yeah! Cartoons, Dragon Tales, Baby Blues, Family Guy, Cartoon Network Studios, Looney Tunes, Disney Television Animation, Brickleberry, Bravest Warriors), character designer (Grim & Evil), director (The Twisted Tales of Felix the Cat, Star vs. the Forces of Evil, Animaniacs) and producer (The Twisted Tales of Felix the Cat, Cartoon Network Studios, Star vs. the Forces of Evil).
- February 4: Tim Cahill, American producer, writer, animator and cartoonist (Warner Bros. Animation, Littlest Pet Shop, co-creator of My Gym Partner's A Monkey).
- February 13: Neal McDonough, American actor (voice of Bruce Banner in The Incredible Hulk, Green Arrow in DC Showcase: Green Arrow, Deadshot in Batman: Assault on Arkham, Firebrand in the Iron Man episode "Fire and Rain", Dum Dum Dugan in the What If...? episode "What If...? Captain Carter Were the First Avenger?").
- February 22: Rachel Dratch, American actress and comedian (voice of Negative Girl in Teen Titans Go!, Nora Fries and Hippolyta in Harley Quinn, Adrena Lynn in the Kim Possible episode "All the News", Actress Playing Aang in the Avatar: The Last Airbender episode "The Ember Island Players", Alison Heart in the Bubble Guppies episode "Alison in Wonderland!").
- February 24: Billy Zane, American actor (voice of John Rolfe in Pocahontas II: Journey to a New World, Etrigan in The New Batman Adventures episode "The Demon Within").
- February 25: Alexis Denisof, American actor (voice of Mirror Master in Justice League: Doom and the Justice League Unlimited episode "Flash and Substance", Nigel Taylor in Tarzan & Jane, Zander in the Batman Beyond episode "Curse of the Kobra").
- February 27:
  - Bill Oakley, American television producer (The Simpsons, Futurama, Chicago Party Aunt, Disenchantment, Close Enough) and writer (The Simpsons, Regular Show, The Cleveland Show, Disenchantment, Close Enough, co-creator of Mission Hill).
  - Kinji Yoshimoto, Japanese animator, film director (Legend of Lemnear, I Couldn't Become a Hero, So I Reluctantly Decided to Get a Job, Unbreakable Machine-Doll, Seven Mortal Sins) and composer, (d. 2021).
  - Gregg Rainwater, American actor (voice of Jake Nez in Max Steel, Tye Longshadow in Young Justice, Long Shadow in the Justice League Unlimited episode "Ultimatum", additional voices in Pocahontas II: Journey to a New World).

=== March ===
- March 1:
  - Mike Schank, American actor and musician (voiced himself in the Family Guy episode "Brian Sings and Swings"), (d. 2022).
  - Zack Snyder, American film director, producer, screenwriter, and cinematographer (Legend of the Guardians: The Owls of Ga'Hoole, Twilight of the Gods, voiced himself in the Teen Titans Go! episode "365!", and the Rick and Morty episode "Ricker than Fiction").
- March 3:
  - Tone Loc, American rapper, actor, and producer (voice of Chestnut in Chowder, Tek in Titan A.E., Goanna in FernGully: The Last Rainforest, Pee-Wee in Bebe's Kids, Magma in the Aladdin episode "Smolder and Wiser", Hyde in the Static Shock episode "Static Shaq", Moon Man in the Uncle Grandpa episode "Bezt Friends").
  - Arrin Skelley, American former child actor (voice of Charlie Brown in It's Your First Kiss, Charlie Brown, You're the Greatest, Charlie Brown, She's a Good Skate, Charlie Brown and Bon Voyage, Charlie Brown (and Don't Come Back!!)).
- March 4: Dav Pilkey, American children's author, cartoonist and illustrator (creator of Captain Underpants, Dog Man, Dragon, and Dumb Bunnies).
- March 5: Julie McNally Cahill, American producer, writer, animator and cartoonist (Warner Bros. Animation, Tutenstein, Littlest Pet Shop, co-creator of My Gym Partner's A Monkey).
- March 14: Gary Anthony Williams, American voice actor and comedian (voice of Uncle Ruckus in The Boondocks, Mr. DOS in Special Agent Oso, Riff Tamson in Star Wars: The Clone Wars, Bebop in Teenage Mutant Ninja Turtles: Out of the Shadows, Mufasa in The Lion Guard, Perry Porter in The Owl House, Pops in Moon Girl and Devil Dinosaur).
- March 15: Cas Anvar, Canadian actor (voice of Ra's al Ghul in Batman vs. Teenage Mutant Ninja Turtles).
- March 20: Kenji Kamiyama, Japanese anime director (Ghost in the Shell, The Lord of the Rings: The War of the Rohirrim).
- March 22: Gary Janetti, American television writer, producer, and actor (Family Guy).
- March 26: Michael Imperioli, American actor (voice of Frankie in Shark Tale, Dante Jr. in The Simpsons episode "The Mook, the Chef, the Wife and Her Homer").
- March 29: Brian Beacock, American actor (voice of Trevor in Globehunters: An Around the World in 80 Days Adventure, Nick Tripp in Gormiti, Théo Barbot in Miraculous: Tales of Ladybug & Cat Noir, Don and Gon in Beastars, Ryunosuke Akutagawa in Bungo Stray Dogs, Takeru Higa in Sword Art Online, Chojuro in Boruto: Naruto Next Generations, Yumichika Ayasegawa in Bleach).

=== April ===
- April 15: Beverly Thomson, Canadian journalist and television host (voiced herself in the Wapos Bay episode "Long Goodbyes").
- April 18: Andrew Karpen, American studio executive (Focus Features), (d. 2025).
- April 22: Jeffrey Dean Morgan, American actor (voice of Negan in the Robot Chicken episode "The Robot Chicken Walking Dead Special: Look Who's Walking", Conquest in Invincible, Wolf Fang in the Big City Greens episode "Evil Family").
- April 27: Yoshihiro Togashi, Japanese manga artist (YuYu Hakusho, Hunter x Hunter).

=== May ===
- May 1: Charlie Schlatter, American voice actor (voice of Tadpole in Fish Police, B-Bop-A-Luna in Butt-Ugly Martians, Tommy Cadle, Clinton and Old Man Bitters in Pet Alien, Cameron in Bratz, Hawk in A.T.O.M., Ace Bunny in Loonatics Unleashed, Kevin Levin in Ben 10, Waly West/Flash in the Superman: The Animated Series episode "Speed Demons", Flash in The Batman, Justice League Action and Scooby-Doo and Guess Who?, Doctor Mindbender, Wild Bill and Lift-Ticket in G.I. Joe: Renegades, the title character in Kick Buttowski: Suburban Daredevil, Sport in Harriet the Spy).
- May 5:
  - Josh Weinstein, American television writer and producer (The Simpsons, Sit Down, Shut Up, Futurama, Strange Hill High, The Awesomes, Brickleberry, Gravity Falls, Danger Mouse, Disenchantment, co-creator of Mission Hill).
  - Bryan Loren, American songwriter (wrote "Do the Bartman" for The Simpsons), (d. 2026). (Note: Some sources mislabel his age as "58".)
- May 12: Stephen Baldwin, American actor and filmmaker (voice of Surly in Dino Time, Charlie Bigelow / Big Time in the Batman Beyond episode "Big Time").
- May 20:
  - Mindy Cohn, American voice actress (voice of Velma Dinkley in the Scooby-Doo franchise from 2002 to 2015).
  - Jennifer Ventimilia, American television producer and writer (The Simpsons, The Critic, Duckman, Yogi Bear, Rio, Teenage Mutant Ninja Turtles, co-creator of Robot and Monster).
- May 21: Lisa Edelstein, American actress (voice of Mercy Graves in the DC Animated Universe, Kya in The Legend of Korra, Sharri Rothberg in American Dad!, Alexis in the King of the Hill episode "The Powder Puff Boys").
- May 22: J. Grant Albrecht, American actor (voice of Leo in Oswald, Locksmith Hero in the Higglytown Heroes episode "Unlock the Magic", General Hoffman in the Justice League episode "The Savage Time").
- May 23: H. Jon Benjamin, American actor and comedian (voice of Sterling Archer in Archer, Bob Belcher in Bob's Burgers, Coach McGuirk in Home Movies, Carl in Family Guy, The Master in The Venture Bros., Prof. Nick Parsons in Science Court).
- May 26: Helena Bonham Carter, English actress (voice of Emily in Corpse Bride, Lady Tottington in Wallace & Gromit: The Curse of the Were-Rabbit, Maudra Mayrin in The Dark Crystal: Age of Resistance).

=== June ===
- June 5: Karen Strassman, American voice actress (voice of Kallen Stadtfeld in Code Geass, Momo Hinamori and Soi Fon in Bleach).
- June 7: Chang Yu-sheng, Taiwanese musician, actor, and comedian (dub voice of teenage Hercules in Hercules), (d. 1997).
- June 8: Julianna Margulies, American actress (voice of Neera in Dinosaur).
- June 16:
  - Philippe Vidal, French animator, director and creator (The Garfield Show, Belfort & Lupin, Garfield Originals, Boule et Bill,), (d. 2025).
  - Phil Vischer, American voice actor, puppeteer, writer, and animator (co-founder of Big Idea Entertainment, co-creator of and voice of Bob the Tomato in VeggieTales).
- June 18: KJ Schrock, American actor (WOWNow Entertainment), (d. 2022).
- June 19: Samuel West, English actor (voice of Pongo in 101 Dalmatians II: Patch's London Adventure).
- June 27: J. J. Abrams, American filmmaker and composer (voiced himself in the Family Guy episode "Ratings Guy" and The Simpsons episode "Do Pizza Bots Dream of Electric Guitars").
- June 28: John Cusack, American actor, producer, screenwriter and political activist (voice of Dimitri in Anastasia, the title character in Igor).
- June 30: Mike Tyson, American retired professional boxer (voiced himself in Mike Tyson Mysteries).

=== July ===
- July 5: Brian Posehn, American actor and comedian (voice of Sour Cream in Steven Universe, Lobster Claws in Star vs. the Forces of Evil, Octus / Newton in Sym-Bionic Titan, Crocco in Re-Animated and Out of Jimmy's Head, Glen Maverick in Surf's Up, Jim Kuback in Mission Hill, Cousin Larry in Kim Possible).
- July 7: Jim Gaffigan, American comedian, actor, writer, and producer (voice of Peng in Duck Duck Goose, Abraham van Helsing in the Hotel Transylvania franchise, Del in Playmobil: The Movie, Lorenzo Paguro in Luca, Mr. Dudley in WordGirl, Henry Haber in Bob's Burgers, Father Time in Star vs. the Forces of Evil, Hoovy in the Rick and Morty episode "Mort Dinner Rick Andre", himself in the Scooby-Doo and Guess Who? episode "The Fastest Fast Food Fiend!").
- July 8: Mike Nawrocki, American voice actor, writer, animator, and director (co-founder of Big Idea Entertainment, co-creator of and voice of Larry the Cucumber in VeggieTales).
- July 9: Pamela Adlon, American-British voice actress (voice of Bobby Hill in King of the Hill, Ashley Spinelli in Recess, Rose Wilson in Teen Titans Go!, Andy Johnson in Squirrel Boy, Hector MacBadger in Jakers! The Adventures of Piggley Winks, Otto Osworth in Time Squad, Milo Oblong in The Oblongs, Baloo in Jungle Cubs, Dewey in Quack Pack, Leah Stein-Torres in The Ghost and Molly McGee).
- July 10:
  - Doug TenNapel, American animator (creator of Earthworm Jim and Catscratch).
  - Thomas Szabó, French animator, storyboard artist (Highlander: The Animated Series, Sky Dancers, X-DuckX, Oggy and the Cockroaches), writer and director (Space Goofs, Minuscule).
- July 11: Greg Grunberg, American actor (voice of Ant-Man in The Super Hero Squad Show, Uncle Ben in the Ultimate Spider-Man episode "Strange", William in the Rapunzel's Tangled Adventure episode "Vigor the Visionary", Bad Robot's Head of Security in The Simpsons episode "Do Pizza Bots Dream of Electric Guitars").
- July 13: David X. Cohen, American television writer and producer (Beavis and Butt-Head, The Simpsons, Futurama, Disenchantment).
- July 18:
  - Lori Alan, American voice actress (voice of Pearl in SpongeBob SquarePants, Diane Simmons in Family Guy, Lt. Felina Feral in SWAT Kats: The Radical Squadron, Bonnie's Mom in the Toy Story franchise, Invisible Woman in Fantastic Four, Momma in Henry Hugglemonster).
  - Lawrence Guterman, Canadian film director (Cats & Dogs, Son of The Mask), writer, producer, voice actor and cartoonist.
- July 19: Blue Demon Jr., Mexican professional wrestler (voiced himself in the ¡Mucha Lucha! episode "The Magnificent Three").
- July 29: Richard Steven Horvitz, American voice actor (voice of Dagget in The Angry Beavers, the title character in Invader Zim, Billy in The Grim Adventures of Billy & Mandy, Grey Matter and Sublimino in Ben 10, Rodney in Squirrel Boy, Kaos in Skylanders Academy, Moxxie in Helluva Boss, Jimmy Osgood in the Static Shock episode "Jimmy").
- July 31: Dean Cain, American actor (voice of Mikado in The Tale of the Princess Kaguya, Jonathan Kent in DC Super Hero Girls, King Charlemagne in the Adventures from the Book of Virtues episode "Integrity").

=== August ===
- August 1: Dan Gerson, American voice actor (voice of Needleman and Smitty in Monsters, Inc., Desk Sergeant in Big Hero 6, additional voices in Monsters University) and screenwriter (Duckman, Pixar, Walt Disney Animation Studios), (d. 2016).
- August 2: Kate Boutilier, American television producer and writer (Klasky Csupo, The Mr. Men Show, Olivia, Poppy Cat, Space Racers).
- August 5: James Gunn, American filmmaker (Scooby-Doo, Scooby-Doo 2: Monsters Unleashed, Creautre Commandos, Coyote vs. Acme, and actor (voice of Wrist Watch in the I Am Groot episode "Groot's Pursuit", himself in Harley Quinnn, and the Rick and Morty episode "Ricker Than Fiction").
- August 10: André Sogliuzzo, American actor (voice of Hakoda in Avatar: The Last Airbender, Smokey and Steamer in The Polar Express, Hsi Wu in Jackie Chan Adventures, Gaspar in Brandy & Mr. Whiskers, King Radius in Winx Club, various characters in Celebrity Deathmatch, Piniet in The Owl House episode "Sense and Insensitivity").
- August 12: Michael Dobson, British actor (voice of Bulk Biceps and Dr. Caballeron in My Little Pony: Friendship Is Magic, Blob in X-Men: Evolution, Big Ears in Make Way for Noddy, Sergeant Savage in G.I. Joe Extreme, Powerlock in ReBoot, Ronan the Accuser in Fantastic Four: World's Greatest Heroes, Starscream in the Transformers: Unicron Trilogy).
- August 14: Halle Berry, American actress (voice of Cappy in Robots, herself in The Simpsons episode "Angry Dad: The Movie").
- August 17: Matt Maiellaro, American filmmaker, musician, and voice actor (Aqua Teen Hunger Force, Perfect Hair Forever, 12 oz. Mouse).
- August 20: Dimebag Darrell, American musician and member of Pantera (composed the track "Prehibernation" which was used in the SpongeBob SquarePants episode "Prehibernation Week", and "Walk" which was used in Sonic the Hedgehog 2), (d. 2004).
- August 23:
  - Cleto Escobedo III, American musician (Alpha and Omega), (d. 2025).
  - Alex Johns, American production coordinator (The Ren & Stimpy Show) and producer (Futurama, Olive, the Other Reindeer, The Ant Bully), (d. 2010).
- August 31: Matthew O'Callaghan, American animator (Walt Disney Animation Studios, Rover Dangerfield, Asterix Conquers America, The Pagemaster, ImageMovers, Alvin and the Chipmunks: The Road Chip), storyboard artist (Walt Disney Animation Studios, Rover Dangerfield, Freakazoid!, Cats Don't Dance, Family Guy, Cinderella III: A Twist in Time, Trash Truck, Mickey Mouse Funhouse), character designer (Rover Dangerfield, Freakazoid!), writer and director (Sport Goofy in Soccermania, Mickey's Twice Upon a Christmas, Curious George, Open Season 2, Looney Tunes, Mickey Mouse Funhouse, creator of The Itsy Bitsy Spider, co-creator of Life with Louie).

=== September ===
- September 2: Salma Hayek, Mexican-American actress and producer (voice of Kitty Softpaws in Puss in Boots and Puss in Boots: The Last Wish, Theresa del Taco in Sausage Party, Cutlass Lizz in The Pirates! In an Adventure with Scientists!).
- September 7: Toby Jones, English actor (voice of The Librarian in The Dark Crystal: Age of Resistance, Arnim Zola in What If...?, Owl in Christopher Robin).
- September 9:
  - Adam Sandler, American comedian, actor and filmmaker (writer and voice of Davey Stone, Whitey Duvall, Eleanor Duvall and Deer in Eight Crazy Nights, Dracula in the Hotel Transylvania franchise, the title character in Leo).
  - Yoshifumi Ushima, Japanese singer-songwriter (performed an insert song in H2 and the theme songs of H2 and Mobile Fighter G Gundam), (d. 2022).
- September 19: Craig Shemin, American television writer (The Jim Henson Company, Dog City, Courage the Cowardly Dog, The 7D, Dora and Friends: Into the City!, Clifford the Big Red Dog).
- September 26: Lona Williams, American screenwriter (Shark Tale), television producer, production assistant and voice actor (voice of Truong Van Dinh, Debra Jo Smallwood and Amber Dempsey in The Simpsons).
- September 28: Maria Canals-Barrera, American actress (voice of Hawkgirl in the DC Animated Universe, Fire in Justice League Unlimited, Sunset Boulevardez in The Proud Family and The Proud Family: Louder and Prouder, Shelly Sandoval in Static Shock, Rio Morales in Ultimate Spider-Man, Ellen Yindel in Batman: The Dark Knight Returns, Paulina in Danny Phantom).
- September 29: Mark Gravas, Australian animator, storyboard artist (Beat Bugs, Alien TV), overseas supervisor (Beat Bugs, Motown Magic), director (Casper's Scare School) and producer (creator of Yakkity Yak, co-creator of CJ the DJ).

=== October ===
- October 1: Scott Innes, American voice actor, author, songwriter and radio personality (voice of Argo in Megas XLR, continued voice of the title character and Shaggy Rogers in the Scooby-Doo franchise).
- October 6: Jacqueline Obradors, American actress (voice of Audrey Ramirez in Atlantis: The Lost Empire and Atlantis: Milo's Return, La Dama in Catwoman: Hunted, Alanna in Young Justice).
- October 11:
  - Luke Perry, American actor (voice of Napoleon Brie in Biker Mice from Mars, Sub-Zero in Mortal Kombat: Defenders of the Realm, Rick Jones in The Incredible Hulk, Stewart Waldinger in Pepper Ann, Ponce de Leon in the Clone High episode "Litter Kills: Literally", Jacob in the Generator Rex episode "The Architect", Fang in the Pound Puppies episode "Rebel Without a Collar", voiced himself in The Simpsons episode "Krusty Gets Kancelled", the Family Guy episode "The Story on Page One", and the Johnny Bravo episode "Luke Perry's Guide to Love"), (d. 2019).
  - Todd Snider, American singer (voice of Lobster Freak in the Squidbillies episode "Clowny Freaks"), (d. 2025).
- October 12: Rupert Gregson-Williams, British composer, conductor, and record producer (DreamWorks Animation).
- October 16: Mary Elizabeth McGlynn, American actress (voice of Motoko Kusanagi in Ghost in the Shell: Stand Alone Complex, Kurenai Yuhi in Naruto, Julia in Cowboy Bebop, Cornelia li Britannia in Code Geass, Priyanka Maheswaran in Steven Universe, Brooha in Glitter Force, Dynamite Watkins and Miss Quantum in OK K.O.! Let's Be Heroes).
- October 18:
  - Sarah Dyer, American comic book writer and television writer (Warner Bros. Animation, Crayon Shin-chan).
  - Shawna Trpcic, American costume designer (The SpongeBob Movie: Sponge on the Run), (d. 2023).
- October 19: Jon Favreau, American actor and filmmaker (voice of Crumford Lorak in Buzz Lightyear of Star Command, Reilly in Open Season, Pre Vizsla in Star Wars: The Clone Wars, Happy Hogan in What If...?, Jealousy in the Hercules episode "Hercules and the Green-Eyed Monster", Donny Sciberra in the Family Guy episode "Road to Europe").
- October 22: Melinda Dilger, American sound supervisor (Disney Television Animation, Johnny Test) and producer (Rocko's Modern Life, Hey Arnold!, The Land Before Time VI: The Secret of Saurus Rock, Hoops & Yoyo Ruin Christmas, Arcane).
- October 28: Andy Richter, American actor (voice of Mort in the Madagascar franchise, Globby in Big Hero 6: The Series, DelMonaco in American Dad!, Brave in The Stinky & Dirty Show, Wayne in Bob's Burgers, Chronos in Justice League Action, Ben Higgenbottom in The Mighty B!).
- October 31:
  - Mike O'Malley, American actor (voice of Darryl MacPherson in Baby Blues, Ray in the Axe Cop episode "Taxi Cop", Artie in the BoJack Horseman episode "Live Fast, Diane Nguyen", himself in the Sanjay and Craig episode "G.U.T.S. Busters").
  - Adam Horovitz, American musician, actor and member of the Beastie Boys (voiced himself in the Futurama episode "Hell Is Other Robots").

=== November ===
- November 2: David Schwimmer, American actor, comedian, director and producer (voice of Melman in the Madagascar franchise).
- November 3: Gary Anthony Sturgis, American actor and musician (voice of Ebon in Static Shock, Phantom Virus in Scooby-Doo and the Cyber Chase, Bronze Tiger in the Batman: The Brave and the Bold episode "Return of the Fearsome Fangs!", Trogaar in the Teen Titans episode "Go!").
- November 8: Gordon Ramsay, British chef, restaurateur, television personality, and writer (voice of Baker Smurf in Smurfs: The Lost Village, Chef in the Phineas and Ferb episode "Thanks But No Thanks", Gerald Oxley in the Mickey and the Roadster Racers episode "Diner Dog Rescue", Bolton Gramercy in the Big Hero 6: The Series episode "Food Fight", himself in The Simpsons episode "The Food Wife" and The Adventures of Rocky and Bullwinkle episode "The Stink of Fear").
- November 15: Tony Cervone, American animator, producer, director, screenwriter, and actor (Warner Bros. Animation).
- November 17: Thomas McHugh, American actor (voice of Doug Funnie and Lincoln the A.V. Nerd in Doug, Johnny Pompalope in the PB&J Otter episode "The Johnny Pompalope Story", additional voices in Gravedale High and Kid 'n Play).
- November 19: Jason Scott Lee, American actor and martial artist (voice of David Kawena in the Lilo & Stitch franchise).
- November 22: Michael K. Williams, American actor, dancer, model and choreographer (voice of Lucius in High School USA!, Satan and Nigerian Dude in Lucas Bros. Moving Co., Smokey Greenwood in F Is for Family, Unnamed Citizen in the Aqua Teen Hunger Force episode "Allen Part Two"), (d. 2021).
- November 23:
  - Jerome Ranft, American animator, sculptor and actor (Pixar).
  - Michelle Gomez, Scottish actress (voice of Morag in The Loud House Movie, Cruella de Vil in 101 Dalmatian Street, Matilda McDuck in the DuckTales episode "The Fight for Castle McDuck!", Captain Hoggbottom in Zootopia 2).
- November 25: Billy Burke, American actor (voice of Jim Gordon in Batman: The Long Halloween).
- November 26: Kristin Bauer van Straten, American actress (voice of Mera in Justice League, Killer Frost in Suicide Squad: Hell to Pay).
- November 27: Andy Merrill, American voice actor (voice of Brak in Space Ghost Coast to Coast, Cartoon Planet and The Brak Show, Oglethorpe, Merle, Easter Bunny, Germ and Rice Henchmen in Aqua Teen Hunger Force, James in Adventure Time, Tony, Guy #1 and Andrew in TripTank, Muhlstrohmmer in Welcome to the Wayne, Jenny in the Perfect Hair Forever episode "Pilot", Yusuf in the Assy McGee episode "Bikes for Bombs", Teeth in the Gravity Falls episode "Weirdmageddon", Bag in the Harvey Beaks episode "Bag of Naughty"), television producer and writer (Space Ghost Coast to Coast, Cartoon Planet, Krypto the Superdog, co-creator of The Brak Show).

=== December ===
- December 1: Andrew Adamson, New Zealand film director, producer, and screenwriter (Shrek).
- December 3: Joshua Sternin, American television producer and writer (The Simpsons, The Critic, Duckman, Yogi Bear, Rio, Teenage Mutant Ninja Turtles, co-creator of Robot and Monster).
- December 4:
  - Carey Means, American voice actor (voice of Frylock in Aqua Teen Hunger Force, Thundercleese in The Brak Show).
  - Fred Armisen, American actor and comedian (voice of Elliot Birch in Big Mouth, Cole in The Lego Ninjago Movie, KVN in Final Space, Cranky Kong in The Super Mario Bros. Movie, Speedy Gonzales in The Looney Tunes Show, Gustavo Calderon in Archer, Herbert in Nature Cat, Splendib and Malandrew in Centaurworld, Terrence in The Simpsons episode "The Day the Earth Stood Cool", Tommy in the Bob's Burgers episode "Nude Beach").
- December 7: C. Thomas Howell, American actor (voice of Eobard Thawne in the DC Animated Movie Universe, Will Magnus in Justice League: Gods and Monsters).
- December 8: Michael Cole, American pro wrestling commentator (voiced himself in Scooby-Doo! WrestleMania Mystery, Scooby-Doo! and WWE: Curse of the Speed Demon, Surf's Up 2: WaveMania, and The Jetsons & WWE: Robo-WrestleMania!).
- December 9: Toby Huss, American actor (voice of Khan Souphanousinphone Sr. and Cotton Hill in King of the Hill, Scaramantula, General Treister, and Copy-Cat in The Venture Bros., Todd Ianuzzi in Beavis and Butt-Head Do the Universe).
- December 11: Gary Dourdan, American actor (voice of Crispus Allen in Batman: Gotham Knight, Ken Fillmore in the Fillmore! episode "Cry, the Beloved Mascot", Dash DaMont in the Kim Possible episode "Team Impossible").
- December 21:
  - Kiefer Sutherland, British-Canadian actor (voice of Hans/The Nutcracker in The Nutcracker Prince, Ross Sylibus in Armitage III: Poly-Matrix, Bron in The Land Before Time X: The Great Longneck Migration, Samson in The Wild, Raistlin Majere in Dragonlance: Dragons of Autumn Twilight, General Warren R. Monger in Monsters vs. Aliens, Jack Bauer in The Simpsons episode "24 Minutes").
  - Adam Schefter, American sports writer and television analyst (voiced himself in The Simpsons episode "The Longest Marge").
- December 23: Clément Oubrerie, French comic artist, director, producer, screenwriter and animator (The Rabbi's Cat, Aya of Yop City), (d. 2026).
- December 24: Diedrich Bader, American actor and comedian (voice of Batman in Batman: The Brave and the Bold and Harley Quinn, Hoss Delgado in The Grim Adventures of Billy and Mandy, Booster Gold in Justice League Action, Guy Gardner in Green Lantern: The Animated Series, Zeta in the DC Animated Universe, The Missing Link in Monsters vs. Aliens, Kraven the Hunter and Moon Knight in Ultimate Spider-Man, Simian in the Ben 10 franchise, Warp Darkmatter in Buzz Lightyear of Star Command).
- December 28:
  - David Fane, New Zealand actor (voice of Truffler in Zootopia 2, Kele in Moana 2, various characters in bro'Town).
  - Dave Underwood, American voice actor (voice of Chief in You're Under Arrest, Talos in Crusher Joe, Akai in Kite, Iga in Blue Submarine No. 6), (d. 2024).
- December 31: Maddie Taylor, American voice actress, storyboard artist, and comedienne (voice of Verminous Flytrap in T.U.F.F. Puppy, Sparky in The Fairly OddParents, Dana Dufresne in The Loud House, George W. Bush in the South Park episode "Mystery of the Urinal Deuce").

== Deaths ==
=== March ===
- March 25: Colin Campbell, Scottish actor (voice of Mr. Mole in The Adventures of Ichabod and Mr. Toad), dies at age 83.

=== April ===
- April 28: Jesse Marsh, American comics artist and animator (Walt Disney Company), dies at age 58.

=== June ===
- June 19: Ed Wynn, American actor and comedian (voice of Mad Hatter in Alice in Wonderland), dies at age 79.

=== July ===
- July 3: Deems Taylor, American composer (master of ceremonies in Fantasia), dies at age 80.
- July 16: Leslie Elton, American animator and comics artist (worked for J.R. Bray), dies at age 72.
- July 23: Donald Novis, English-born American actor and tenor (voice of Singing Dog in Toyland Broadcast, sang "Love is a Song" and "Looking for Romance" in Bambi, and "Peace on Earth" in Lady and the Tramp), dies at age 60.
- July 28: Judd Conlon, American vocal arranger and conductor (Alice in Wonderland, Peter Pan), dies at age 56.

=== August ===
- August 7: Charles Thorson, Canadian political cartoonist, animator (worked for Walt Disney Animation, MGM Cartoons, Warner Bros. Cartoons, Fleischer Studios, Terrytoons, Screen Gems, George Pal Studios), character designer (Snow White, Bugs Bunny, Little Hiawatha), children's book author and illustrator (The Captain and the Kids), dies at age 75.
- August 16: Jack Mather, American actor (voice of Wally Walrus in Woody Woodpecker), dies at age 58.

=== September ===
- September 26: Helen Kane, American actress and singer, (primary inspiration for the character of Betty Boop), dies at age 62.

=== November ===
- November 2: Yasuji Murata, Japanese animator, master of cutout animation, (produced dozens of mostly educational films, featuring characters such as Momotarō and Norakuro), dies at age 70.

=== December ===
- December 14: Verna Felton, American actress (voice of Mrs. Jumbo and Elephant Matriarch in Dumbo, Fairy Godmother in Cinderella, Queen of Hearts in Alice in Wonderland, Aunt Sarah in Lady and the Tramp, Flora and Queen Leah in Sleeping Beauty, Pearl Slaghoople in The Flintstones, Winifred in The Jungle Book), dies at age 76.
- December 15: Walt Disney, American animator, film producer (The Walt Disney Company) and entrepreneur (developed and voice the character of Mickey Mouse, pioneered the use of synchronized sound full-color three-strip Technicolor and feature-length films in American animation), dies from lung cancer at age 65.
- December 23: Volney White, American animator and director (Romer Grey Pictures, Warner Bros. Cartoons), dies at age 59.
- December 28: Clarence Wheeler, American composer (wrote music for Walter Lantz's and George Pal's cartoons, as well as Crusader Rabbit and Gumby), dies at age 81.

== See also ==
- 1966 in anime
