= 1960 in animation =

Events in 1960 in animation.

== Events ==
=== January ===
- January 19: Chuck Jones' Wile E. Coyote and Road Runner cartoon Fastest with the Mostest premieres, produced by Warner Bros. Cartoons.
- January 21: Wolfgang Reitherman's Goliath II, produced by the Walt Disney Company, premieres.
- January 23: Robert McKimson's Speedy Gonzales and Sylvester cartoon West of the Pesos premieres, produced by Warner Bros. Cartoons.

=== February ===
- February 8: Mel Blanc, Walt Disney, and George Pal receive stars at the Hollywood Walk of Fame.
- February 23: The first episode of Torchy the Battery Boy airs.
- February 25: The first episode of Four Feather Falls airs.

=== March ===
- March 15: Friz Freleng's Sylvester cartoon Goldimouse and the Three Cats premieres, produced by Warner Bros. Cartoons. Also starring Sylvester Jr. (marking the only time he appears in a short not directed by Robert McKimson).

=== April ===
- April 1: Friz Freleng's Bugs Bunny, Elmer Fudd, & Daffy Duck cartoon Person to Bunny is released, produced by Warner Bros. Cartoons. It marks the final time Arthur Q. Bryan voiced Elmer Fudd before his death in 1959.
- April 4: 32nd Academy Awards: Moonbird by John Hubley wins the Academy Award for Best Animated Short.
- April 23: Chuck Jones' Pepé Le Pew cartoon Who Scent You? premieres, produced by Warner Bros. Cartoons. Also starring Penelope Pussycat.

=== May ===
- May 14: Friz Freleng's Tweety and Sylvester cartoon Hyde and Go Tweet premieres, produced by Warner Bros. Cartoons.

=== June ===
- June 4: Chuck Jones' Bugs Bunny and Wile E. Coyote cartoon Rabbit's Feat premieres, produced by Warner Bros. Cartoons.
- June 20: 12th Primetime Emmy Awards: The Huckleberry Hound Show wins an Emmy Award for Outstanding Achievement in the Field of Children's Programming, becoming the first animated TV series to receive this honor.
- June 25: Robert McKimson's Foghorn Leghorn cartoon Crockett-Doodle-Do premieres, produced by Warner Bros. Cartoons. Also starring Egghead Jr..

=== July ===
- July 16: Friz Freleng's Sylvester cartoon Mouse and Garden premieres, produced by Warner Bros. Cartoons. Also starring Sam Cat.

=== August ===
- August 14: The anime film Alakazam the Great by Taji Yabushita and Daisaku Shirakawa premieres.

=== September ===
- September 3: Friz Freleng's Bugs Bunny and Yosemite Sam cartoon From Hare to Heir premieres, produced by Warner Bros. Cartoons. This short is notorious for having Yosemite Sam at his angriest.
- September 24: Robert McKimson's Foghorn Leghorn cartoon The Dixie Fryer premieres, produced by Warner Bros. Cartoons. The short also stars the characters Pappy and Elvis from McKimson's Bugs Bunny cartoon Backwoods Bunny.
- September 30: The first episode of The Flintstones airs, the first American prime time animated television series to become a ratings hit. It marks the debut of Fred Flintstone, Wilma Flintstone, Barney Rubble and Betty Rubble.

=== October ===
- October 8: Chuck Jones' Wile E. Coyote and Road Runner cartoon Hopalong Casualty premieres, produced by Warner Bros. Cartoons.
- October 11: The first episode of The Bugs Bunny Show premieres on ABC.

=== November ===
- November 7: The first episode of Mister Magoo airs.

=== December ===
- December 3: Chuck Jones' High Note premieres.
- December 17: Friz Freleng's Bugs Bunny and Yosemite Sam cartoon Lighter Than Hare premieres, produced by Warner Bros. Cartoons.
- The first episode of Joë Chez Les Abeilles / Joë Petit Boum-Boum (Joe the Little Boom Boom) airs.

=== Specific date unknown ===
- The first episode of Popeye the Sailor airs.
- The first episode of Snip and Snap airs.
- Valentin Lalayants, Valentina and Zinaida Brumberg's It Was I Who Drew the Little Man premieres.
- In Annecy, France, the International Animated Film Association is established, consisting of the Annecy International Animated Film Festival.

== Films released ==
- March 1 - Donald Duck and his Companions (United States)
- August 14 - Alakazam the Great (Japan)
- Specific date unknown - It Was I Who Drew the Little Man (Soviet Union)

== Television series debuts ==
- June 10 - Popeye the Sailor debuts in syndication.
- June 19 - The New Adventures of Pinocchio debuts in syndication.
- September - The Nutty Squirrels Present debuts in syndication.
- September 11 - Hokey Wolf debuts in syndication.
- September 14 - Courageous Cat and Minute Mouse debuts in syndication.
- September 24 - Q.T. Hush debuts on KTTV.
- September 30 - The Flintstones debuts on ABC.
- October 11 - The Bugs Bunny Show debuts on ABC and CBS.
- October 15 - King Leonardo and His Short Subjects, The Hunter, Tooter Turtle, and Twinkles debut on NBC.
- November 7 - Mister Magoo debuts in syndication.
- Specific date unknown:
  - Foo-Foo debuts on ABC.
  - Snip and Snap debuts on Sveriges Radio TV.

== Births ==
=== January ===
- January 2: Joe Liss, American television writer (3-South, SpongeBob SquarePants, Drawn Together, George of the Jungle, Yin Yang Yo!, Spaceballs: The Animated Series, Kick Buttowski: Suburban Daredevil).
- January 4: April Winchell, American voice actress (voice of Peg in Goof Troop, Muriel Finster in Recess, Lydia Pearson in Pepper Ann, Sylvia in Wander Over Yonder, Cruella de Vil in 101 Dalmatians: The Series, Black Heron in DuckTales, Terk in The Legend of Tarzan, Mrs. Herman in Who Framed Roger Rabbit, Queen Voratia Rumbletum in the Ben 10: Omniverse episode "Tummy Trouble", continued voice of Clarabelle Cow).
- January 11: Ettore Zuim, Brazilian actor (Brazilian dub voice of Yakko Warner in Animaniacs, Jon Arbuckle in Garfield and Friends), (d. 2026).
- January 12:
  - Oliver Platt, American actor (voice of Hades in Wonder Woman, Everburn in Sofia the First, Documentary Narrator in the American Dad! episode "Next of Pin").
  - Jorge Pupo, Cuban-American actor (voice of the title character in the Courage the Cowardly Dog episode "King of Flan").
- January 15: Kelly Asbury, American storyboard artist (Walt Disney Animation Studios), screenwriter, actor (voice of Master of Ceremonies and Fiddlesworth in Shrek the Third, Red Goon Gnomes in Gnomeo & Juliet), author/illustrator and film director (Spirit: Stallion of the Cimarron, Shrek 2, Gnomeo and Juliet, Smurfs: The Lost Village, UglyDolls), (d. 2020).
- January 17: Tracey Moore, Canadian voice actress and director (voice of the title character in the DIC dub of Sailor Moon, Princess Toadstool in The Adventures of Super Mario Bros. 3 and Super Mario World, George in George Shrinks, Marcus Snarkis in Flying Rhino Junior High).
- January 25: Audrey Wells, American producer, director and screenwriter (Over the Moon), (d. 2018).
- January 27: Philip Rosenthal, American television writer, producer and actor (voice of TV Dad in The Simpsons Movie, Danny Bananas in the BoJack Horseman episode "A Little Uneven, Is All", himself in The Simpsons episode "Undercover Burns").
- January 29:
  - JG Thirlwell, Australian musician, composer and record producer (The Venture Bros., Archer).
  - Steve Sax, American former professional baseball player and coach (voiced himself in The Simpsons episode "Homer at the Bat").

=== February ===
- February 1: Mark Dodson, American voice actor (voice of Cookie Crook and Cookie Cop in ads for Cookie Crisp, Henchmoles in the Darkwing Duck episode "Aduckyphobia", the Locomotive Kid in the Bonkers episode "Trains, Toons, and Toon Trains"), (d. 2024).
- February 3: Aron Abrams, American television producer and writer (King of the Hill, Glenn Martin, DDS, Bob's Burgers), (d. 2010).
- February 6: Harry Thompson, British radio and television producer, comedy writer, novelist and television writer (co-creator of Monkey Dust), (d. 2005).
- February 7:
  - Robert Smigel, American actor, comedian, writer, director, producer, and puppeteer (TV Funhouse, Hotel Transylvania and Leo).
  - Yasunori Matsumoto, Japanese actor (voice of Eren Kruger in Attack on Titan, Jean Havoc in Fullmetal Alchemist, Japanese dub voice of the title character in Turbo, Robin in Batman: The Animated Series, and Roddy in Flushed Away).
- February 14: Achiu So, American animator (Hanna-Barbera, Meena), storyboard artist (WildBrain, Santa, Baby!, Futurama, The Cleveland Show, How Murray Saved Christmas, Family Guy, American Dad!) and background artist (WildBrain).
- February 17: Thom Adcox-Hernandez, American actor (voice of Lexington in Gargoyles, the title character in season 1 of The Twisted Tales of Felix the Cat, Dipstick in 101 Dalmatians: The Series, Simon Lear in Invasion America, Deputy Bean in Tom Sawyer, Mr. Marsh in All Grown Up!, Pupert in The Buzz on Maggie, the Tinkerer in The Spectacular Spider-Man, Sparkplug in Scooby-Doo! and the Goblin King, Flint in Tinker Bell and the Lost Treasure, Klarion the Witch Boy in Young Justice).
- February 18: Tony Anselmo, American voice actor (continued voice of Donald Duck) and animator (Walt Disney Animation Studios, The Simpsons).
- February 19: Charles Schneider, American television writer (The New Woody Woodpecker Show, Poochini, Tom and Jerry Tales).
- February 20:
  - Joel Hodgson, American actor, comedian (voice of Bill Dewey in Steven Universe, Tommy in Welcome to the Wayne) and television writer (Space Ghost Coast to Coast).
  - Shōji Kawamori, Japanese anime creator, producer, screenwriter, visual artist, and mecha designer (Macross).
  - Wendee Lee, American voice actress (voice of Bulma in the Dragon Ball franchise, T.K. Takaishi in Digimon Adventure, Faye Valentine in Cowboy Bebop, Moegi in Naruto, Queen Serenity in the Viz Media dub of Sailor Moon, Vanessa Leeds in Robotech, Kiva Andru in Megas XLR, Yoruichi Shihoin, Tatsuki Arisawa and Ururu Tsumugiya in Bleach, Angel in The Big O, Kiyone Makibi in Tenchi in Tokyo, Twilight Suzuka in Outlaw Star, the title character in The Melancholy of Haruhi Suzumiya).
- February 28: Wojciech Paszkowski, Polish actor (Polish dub voice of Maurice in the Madagascar franchise, Dinky Dalton in The Huckleberry Hound Show, The Great Gazoo in The Flintstones, Roy Rooster in Garfield and Friends, Herbert Landon and Whistler and Captain America in Spider-Man, Galactus and Blastaar in Fantastic Four, Bruce Banner and Hulk in Iron Man, Timon in Timon and Pumbaa, Randy Marsh and Conan O'Brien and Barack Obama in South Park, Beta Ray Bill in Silver Surfer, Zapp Brannigan in Futurama, Catbert in Dilbert, Skeletor in He-Man and the Masters of the Universe, Red Alert and Wing Saber in Transformers: Cybertron, Poe in Ruby Gloom, Black Manta and Jason Blood and Etrigan in Batman: The Brave and the Bold, Nick Fury and Jack Fury in The Avengers: Earth's Mightiest Heroes, J.A.R.V.I.S. and Uncle Ben in Ultimate Spider-Man, Flam and Gustave le Grande and Star Swirl the Bearded in My Little Pony: Friendship is Magic), (d. 2024).

=== March ===
- March 1: William Schifrin, American screenwriter (Nickelodeon Animation Studio, Quest for Camelot, Warner Bros. Animation, Freefonix, Rainbow Butterfly Unicorn Kitty, The Ice Age Adventures of Buck Wild).
- March 4: Vicky Jenson, American animator (FernGully: The Last Rainforest), storyboard artist (Heathcliff, Filmation, Marvel Productions, Police Academy, Dink, the Little Dinosaur, Warner Bros. Animation, FernGully: The Last Rainforest, The Ren & Stimpy Show, The Shnookums and Meat Funny Cartoon Show, The Baby Huey Show, DreamWorks Animation), character designer (Mighty Mouse: The New Adventures, Pound Puppies and the Legend of Big Paw, Beethoven), background artist (Hanna-Barbera, He-Man and the Masters of the Universe, Fat Albert and the Cosby Kids, Mighty Mouse: The New Adventures, Christmas in Tattertown, The Ren & Stimpy Show), art director (FernGully: The Last Rainforest, Beethoven), production designer (Computer Warriors, The Road to El Dorado), writer (The Baby Huey Show) and director (The Baby Huey Show, Shrek, Shark Tale).
- March 12:
  - Kipp Lennon, American musician and member of Venice (voice of Michael Jackstone in The Flintstone Kids' "Just Say No" Special, singing voice of Leon Kompowsky in The Simpsons episodes "Stark Raving Dad" and "Mr. Lisa's Opus", additional voices in The Story of Santa Claus).
  - Robin Klein, American casting director (Foodfight!), (d. 2004).
- March 13:
  - Adam Clayton, English-born Irish musician, bassist and member of U2 (voiced himself in The Simpsons episode "Trash of the Titans").
  - Joe Ranft, American screenwriter, animator, and voice actor (Walt Disney Animation Studios, Pixar), (d. 2005).
- March 17: Vicki Lewis, American actress (voice of Wonder Woman in Batman: The Brave and the Bold, Deb and Flo in Finding Nemo, Beret Girl in An Extremely Goofy Movie, Serena in the Ben 10: Alien Force episode "X = Ben + 2", Agent Locke in the Ben 10: Ultimate Alien episode "The Widening Gyre").
- March 26: Jennifer Grey, American actress (voice of Mrs. Kurokawa in The Wind Rises, Edna in Duck Duck Goose, various characters in Phineas and Ferb).
- March 28: Erika Scheimer. American voice actress (voice of various characters in She-Ra: Princess of Power, Shock Clock, Skelevator and Cory in Ghostbusters, Tweeterbell in Fat Albert and the Cosby Kids, Bratman in Hero High, Marcia Brady in season 2 of The Brady Kids).
- March 29: Hiromi Tsuru, Japanese actress and narrator (voice of Bulma in the Dragon Ball franchise, Meryl Strife in Trigun, Ukyo Kuonji in Ranma ½, Mikami in Ghost Sweeper Mikami), (d. 2017).
- March 31: Michelle Nicastro, American actress, singer and musician (voice of Odette in The Swan Princess) (d. 2010).

=== April ===
- April 3: Younghee Higa, American animation checker (The Simpsons, King of the Hill, Oh Yeah! Cartoons, Hey Arnold!), sheet timer (The Simpsons, King of the Hill, CatDog, Hey Arnold!, Klasky Csupo, Family Guy, Ben 10, American Dad!, Dawn of the Croods, Trolls: The Beat Goes On!, Central Park), lip sync artist (Rugrats) and director (ChalkZone).
- April 4:
  - Hugo Weaving, English actor (voice of Bill Barnacle in The Magic Pudding, Noah in Happy Feet and Happy Feet Two, Noctus and Grimble in Legend of the Guardians: The Owls of Ga'Hoole).
  - Lorraine Toussaint, Trinidadian actress (voice of Shadow Weaver in She-Ra and the Princesses of Power, Rashida Remington in Big City Greens, Masago in the Star Wars: Visions episode "Akakiri", Emily Ghost in the Summer Camp Island episode "The Emily Ghost Institute for Manners and Magical Etiquette", Dr. Franklin in the Static Shock episode "Jimmy", Dr. Lullah in StuGo).
- April 8: John Schneider, American actor and singer (voice of Bo Duke in The Dukes, Dan the Forest Ranger in The Raccoons and the Lost Star, Rick O'Connell in The Mummy, Ace in the King of the Hill episode "You Gotta Believe (In Moderation)").
- April 14: Brad Garrett, American actor and comedian (voice of Hulk Hogan in Hulk Hogan's Rock 'n' Wrestling, Big Dog in 2 Stupid Dogs, Fatso in Casper, Bibbo Bibbowski and Lobo in Superman: The Animated Series, Boss Beaver in Timon & Pumbaa, Trypticon in The Transformers, Gusteau in Ratatouille, Hook Hand in the Tangled franchise, Eeyore in Christopher Robin and Ralph Breaks the Internet, Grin in Mighty Ducks: The Animated Series, Krang in Teenage Mutant Ninja Turtles: Out of the Shadows, Phil in Toonsylvania, Bloat in Finding Nemo, Tank in An Extremely Goofy Movie, Lord of Nightmares in the Earthworm Jim episode "Evil in Love").
- April 27: Javier Fernandez-Peña, Spanish actor (voice of Spanish Buzz in Toy Story 3, additional voices in The Amazing World of Gumball).
- April 29: Steve Blum, American actor (voice of Spike Spiegel in Cowboy Bebop, Roger Smith in The Big O, Mugen in Samurai Champloo, Orochimaru in Naruto, Shishio Makoto in Rurouni Kenshin, Heatblast and Vilgax in Ben 10, Green Goblin in The Spectacular Spider-Man, Amon in The Legend of Korra, Wolverine in numerous Marvel productions, Jamie in Megas XLR, Zeb Orrelios in Star Wars Rebels, continued voice of TOM in Toonami).

=== May ===
- May 6: John Flansburgh, American musician and member of They Might Be Giants (performed the theme songs of Higglytown Heroes and Mickey Mouse Clubhouse).
- May 10: Bono, Irish singer-songwriter, activist, philanthropist and member of U2 (voice of Clay Calloway in Sing 2, himself in The Simpsons episode "Trash of the Titans").
- May 18: Maldwyn Pope, Welsh musician and composer (performed the theme song of Fireman Sam).
- May 19: Jann Carl, American television host (voice of Jann Starl in Wow! Wow! Wubbzy!: Wubb Idol).
- May 20:
  - Tony Goldwyn, American actor and director (voice of the title character in Tarzan).
  - John Billingsley, American actor (voice of Dr. Psy-Q Hi in Duck Dodgers, Dr. Henklefust in the Scooby-Doo! Mystery Incorporated episode "The Night the Clown Cried II: Tears of Doom!").
- May 22: Hideaki Anno, Japanese animator, director, artist, screenwriter and actor (Neon Genesis Evangelion).
- May 23: Robert Leighton, American cartoonist, illustrator, artist, puzzle writer, humorist and television writer (KaBlam!, Ed, Edd n Eddy).
- May 29: Neil Crone, Canadian actor, comedian, writer and motivational speaker (voice of Gordon the Big Engine, Diesel 10 and Splatter in Thomas and the Magic Railroad, Mr. Flack in The Magic School Bus episode "Out of This World", Dr. T. in Slam Dunk, Tony in the Paw Patrol franchise, Perky in Erky Perky, reprised voice of Gordon the Big Engine in Thomas & Friends: All Engines Go).
- May 31:
  - Chris Elliott, American actor, comedian and writer (voice of Klokateer and Dr. Commander Vermin Chuntspinkton in Metalocalypse, Dogbert in Dilbert, Chris Sizemore, Ed Burnett and Rob Holguin in King of the Hill, Dr. Reamus Elliott in the Duckman episode "All About Elliott", Triton in the Hercules episode "Hercules and the Son of Poseidon", Space Drifter in the Minoriteam episode "Space Driftin", Chris in the Code Monkeys episode "Benny's Birthday", V-Giny in the Futurama episode "In-A-Gadda-Da-Leela", Captain and Lord Poltergeist in the SpongeBob SquarePants episode "Ghoul Fools").
  - Mark Dindal, American animator, screenwriter, character designer, storyboard artist, voice actor and film director (Cats Don't Dance, The Emperor's New Groove, Chicken Little).
  - Don Harvey, American actor (voice of Chucko in Batman Beyond: Return of the Joker and Justice League Unlimited, Gnaww in the Superman: The Animated Series episode "The Main Man", Milos Duncek in The Real Adventures of Jonny Quest episode "The Haunted Sonata").

=== June ===
- June 3: Andrei Svislotski, Russian animator and director (Curious George, Rugrats, Aaahh!!! Real Monsters, Sheriff Callie's Wild West, Duckman), (d. 2022).
- June 8: Gary Trousdale, American animator, director, and screenwriter (Walt Disney Animation Studios).
- June 11: Bill Schultz, American animation producer (Film Roman, Cartoon Network, Mike Young Productions, True and the Rainbow Kingdom).
- June 15: Michael Sicoly, American former actor (voice of Papa in season 1 of The Baby Huey Show, Gorgeous in season 1 of Space Goofs, additional voices in Mobile Suit Gundam Wing and Gadget & the Gadgetinis).
- June 17: Thomas Haden Church, American actor (voice of Dwayne in Over the Hedge, Killer Moth in the Teen Titans episode "Date with Destiny", Quillgin in the Regular Show episode "The Christmas Special").
- June 22: Catherine Disher, Canadian actress (voice of Jean Grey in X-Men: The Animated Series and Spider-Man, Mrs. Goose in Franklin, Bromley Polie in Rolie Polie Olie).
- Specific date unknown: Chad Webber, American graphic designer and former child actor (voice of Charlie Brown in Snoopy Come Home, You're Not Elected, Charlie Brown and There's No Time for Love, Charlie Brown).

=== July ===
- July 2: Terry Rossio, American screenwriter (Aladdin, Shrek).
- July 10: Jeff Bergman, American actor (voice of Eustace Bagge in Straight Outta Nowhere: Scooby-Doo! Meets Courage the Cowardly Dog, Joker in Batman: Return of the Caped Crusaders and Batman vs. Two-Face, Coach Spitz in Doug, Odin in What If...?, Mr. Potato Head in Toy Story 5, continued voice of various characters in the Looney Tunes franchise, various characters for Hanna-Barbera, and Droopy).
- July 14: Jane Lynch, American actress and comedian (voice of Sergeant Calhoun in Wreck-It Ralph and Ralph Breaks the Internet, Gretched in Shrek Forever After, Alice in Rio, Dotty Campbell in Family Guy, Madame Rothchild in The Life and Times of Juniper Lee, Jackie Greenway in Handy Manny, Nebula in The Super Hero Squad Show, Mrs. Johnson in Phineas and Ferb, Mrs. Locks in Goldie and Bear, Supersonic Sue in Big Hero 6: The Series, Ole Golly in Harriet the Spy).
- July 15: Willie Aames, American actor, director, producer, and screenwriter (continued voice of Jamie Boyle in Wait Till Your Father Gets Home, voice of Hank the Ranger in Dungeons & Dragons).
- July 19: Steve Viksten, American voice actor (voice of Oskar Kokoshka in Hey Arnold!) and television writer (Rugrats, Duckman, Hey Arnold!, Recess, Higglytown Heroes, The Simpsons), (d. 2014).
- July 22: John Leguizamo, American actor and comedian (voice of Sid in the Ice Age franchise, Bruno Madrigal in Encanto, Gune in Titan A.E.).
- July 23: Jim Kammerud, American director, writer, producer and animator (Walt Disney Company).
- July 26: Ned Goldreyer, American television producer and writer (The Simpsons, Dilbert, Back at the Barnyard).
- July 30: Richard Linklater, American film director, producer, and screenwriter (Waking Life, A Scanner Darkly, Apollo 10½: A Space Age Childhood).

=== August ===
- August 5: John Mariano, American actor (voice of Bobby in Animaniacs, Agent D in Men in Black: The Series, Sewer Czar in The Tick episode "The Tick vs. Filth").
- August 7: David Duchovny, American actor, writer, producer, director, novelist and singer-songwriter (voice of Tiny Jesus in Queer Duck: The Movie, Ice Cream Man in 10 Year Old Tom, Fox Mulder in the Eek! The Cat episode "Eek Space-9" and The Simpsons episode "The Springfield Files", Richard in the Duckman episode "The Girls of Route Canal", himself in the Dr. Katz, Professional Therapist episode "Metaphors").
- August 10:
  - Antonio Banderas, Spanish actor (voice of Puss in Boots in the Shrek franchise).
  - Sunao Katabuchi, Japanese animation director, screenwriter, and storyboard artist.
- August 13: Stevan Wahl, American animator (The Brave Little Toaster, Bill Melendez Productions, Rover Dangerfield, Bebe's Kids, Cats Don't Dance, Walt Disney Animation Studios, Rugrats Go Wild, Futurama, Curious George, The Haunted World of El Superbeasto, The Smurfs: A Christmas Carol) and storyboard artist (Dan Vs., Nickelodeon Animation Studio, The Harper House).
- August 17: Sean Penn, American actor (voice of Terence in The Angry Birds Movie, himself in the Family Guy episode "Hot Shots").
- August 23 Chris Potter, Canadian actor (voice of Gambit in X-Men: The Animated Series and Spider-Man).
- August 28:
  - Barry Purves, English animator.
  - Jodi Carlisle, American actress (voice of Marianne Thornberry in The Wild Thornberrys, Dr. Sara Bellum in Darkwing Duck, Wendy Richter and The Fabulous Moolah in Hulk Hogan's Rock 'n' Wrestling).

=== September ===
- September 1: Joseph Williams, American singer, songwriter and composer (singing voice of adult Simba in The Lion King, performed the Adventures of the Gummi Bears theme).
- September 8: Aimee Mann, American singer-songwriter (voice of Opal in Steven Universe).
- September 13:
  - Greg Baldwin, American voice actor (continued voice of Aku in Samurai Jack, Splinter in Teenage Mutant Ninja Turtles and Iroh in Avatar: The Last Airbender).
  - David Fine, Canadian filmmaker (George and Rosemary, In and Out, Bob's Birthday, Shaun the Sheep, Animal Behaviour, co-creator of Bob and Margaret and Ricky Sprocket: Showbiz Boy).
- September 16: Mike Mignola, American comic writer and author (Atlantis: The Lost Empire, Hellboy Animated, Batman: Gotham by Gaslight, designed Mr. Freeze for Batman: The Animated Series).
- September 21: David James Elliott, Canadian actor (voice of Romac in the Buzz Lightyear of Star Command episode "Star Crossed", Thor in the Hercules episode "Hercules and the Twilight of the Gods").
- September 27:
  - Debi Derryberry, American voice actress (voice of the title character in Jimmy Neutron: Boy Genius and The Adventures of Jimmy Neutron: Boy Genius, Tinker Bell in Peter Pan & the Pirates, Jake Tasmanian Devil in Taz-Mania, Wednesday Addams in The Addams Family, Simon Sez in Ben 10, Ryo-Ohki in Tenchi Muyo!, Candy in Glitter Force, Maya Aida / Glitter Heart in Glitter Force Doki Doki, Diana in the Viz Media dub of Sailor Moon, Cheer Bear in Care Bears: Unlock the Magic).
  - J. Allen Williams, American animator (Darkstar: The Interactive Movie).
  - David Gasman, American actor (voice of Goku in the AB Groupe dub of Dragon Ball Z, William Dunbar in Code Lyoko, Clay Bailey in Xiaolin Chronicles, Henri in My Knight and Me, John, Nansen, and Pesci in Rabbids Invasion).
- September 30: Vincent Waller, American animator (Spümcø), storyboard artist (Hanna-Barbera, DIC Entertainment, Attack of the Killer Tomatoes, Spümcø, The Tick, The Baby Huey Show, Earthworm Jim, Duckman, SpongeBob SquarePants, Cartoon Network Studios, The X's), character designer (The Ren & Stimpy Show, Oh Yeah! Cartoons, Harvey Birdman, Attorney at Law), prop designer (Harvey Birdman, Attorney at Law, SpongeBob SquarePants), background artist, art director (Harvey Birdman, Attorney at Law), overseas supervisor (Happily Ever After: Fairy Tales for Every Child), technical director (SpongeBob SquarePants), writer (Nickelodeon Animation Studio, The Baby Huey Show, Ren & Stimpy "Adult Party Cartoon", Evil Con Carne, The Grim Adventures of Billy & Mandy), director (Nickelodeon Animation Studio, 2 Stupid Dogs, The Oblongs, Harvey Birdman, Attorney at Law) and producer (Nickelodeon Animation Studio).

=== October ===
- October 4: Loren Lester, American voice actor (voice of Dick Grayson in the DC Animated Universe, Barbecue in G.I. Joe: A Real American Hero, Rick Gordon in Defenders of the Earth, Jordan Knight in New Kids on the Block, Hal Jordan/Green Lantern in Batman: The Brave and the Bold, Danny Rand/Iron Fist in The Avengers: Earth's Mightiest Heroes).
- October 9: Madeleine Blaustein, American voice actress and comic book writer (voice of Meowth in seasons 1-8 of Pokémon, Dr. K and Mayor of Bubble Town in Cubix: Robots for Everyone, Solomon Muto and Zygor in Yu-Gi-Oh!, Oslo, Burnt Meatballs, Chef, Audience and King Hungry the Ate in Fighting Foodons, Chef Kawasaki, Waddle Doo, Professor Curio, Tuggle, Gengu, Melman and Biblio in Kirby: Right Back at Ya!, Wally Tusket, Comrade Turbinski and Lord Flash in Ultimate Muscle: The Kinnikuman Legacy, Principal, Police Officer and Chief of Police in Sonic X, Migeira in Samurai Deeper Kyo, Dr. Kureha in the 4Kids dub of One Piece, Overkill in G.I. Joe: Sigma 6, Topher, Sartorius Kumar and Professor in Yu-Gi-Oh! GX, Helga in season 1 of Dinosaur King, Shoe the Shoebill in Impy's Island and Impy's Wonderland, Grizzlepuss in The Little Panda Fighter, Rassimov in Huntik: Secrets & Seekers), (d. 2008).
- October 10: Dan Ferro, American actor (voice of T.J. Finger in the Bonkers episode "The Final Review", Gang Banger #1 and Goon #2 in the Gargoyles episode "For It May Come True"), (d. 2022).
- October 16: Mark Barrows, American effects animator (BraveStarr, Walt Disney Animation Studios, The Simpsons Movie), (d. 2021).
- October 18: Jean-Claude Van Damme, Belgian actor, martial artist, filmmaker, and fight choreographer (voice of Dracula Rhett Butler and himself in the Robot Chicken episode "Maurice Was Caught", Master Croc in Kung Fu Panda 2 and Kung Fu Panda 3, Jean Clawed in Minions: The Rise of Gru).
- October 21: Paul Rugg, American television writer and producer (Warner Bros. Animation, The 7D) and actor (voice of Mr. Director in Animaniacs, the title character in Freakazoid! and the Teen Titans Go! episode "Huggbees", Nostradamus in Histeria!, Dark Lord Chuckles in Dave the Barbarian, Hans Rotwood in American Dragon: Jake Long, Lord Starchbottom in The 7D, Artephius in The Adventures of Puss in Boots, Cricket in Pig Goat Banana Cricket, Gweelok in Secret Mountain Fort Awesome, Cantalop, Ted Viking, and the President of the Universe in OK K.O.! Let's Be Heroes).
- October 24: BD Wong, American actor (voice of Li Shang in Mulan and Mulan II, the Wolf, Aladdin, and the Genie in Happily Ever After: Fairy Tales for Every Child, Hon Wing in Gremlins: Secrets of the Mogwai, Will Du in the Kim Possible episode "Number One", Toad Liu Hai in the DuckTales episode "The House of the Lucky Gander!").
- October 29: Valery Pappas, American actress (voice of Shriek in Skeleton Warriors, Stiffany Deathman and Mother Screetch in Toonsylvania, Jean Farrell, Mother Bear and Eleanor Dewberry in Timon & Pumbaa, High Strung Chicken in Charlotte's Web 2: Wilbur's Great Adventure, Eden in the Aladdin episode "Some Enchanted Genie", Ghost Bride in the Extreme Ghostbusters episode "Till Death Do Us Start", Auntie Foo Foo in The Spooktacular New Adventures of Casper episode "Family Reunion", Girl #2, Mom #3 and Actress in the Cow and Chicken episode "Child Star", Piper in the Pepper Ann episode "One Angry Woman", Ivana Sugardadsky in the Back at the Barnyard episode "The Farmer Takes a Woman", additional voices in Problem Child, Men in Black: The Series, Mad Jack the Pirate, The Secret Files of the Spy Dogs, Jason and the Heroes of Mount Olympus and Secret Mountain Fort Awesome).

=== November ===
- November 4: Kathy Griffin, American actress and comedian (voice of Alice in Dilbert, Caroline in Lion of Oz, Roxanne Gaines in Spider-Man: The New Animated Series, the Bridesmaid in Stripperella, Rhoga in Dinotopia: Quest for the Ruby Sunstone, Vera in A Turtle's Tale: Sammy's Adventures, Taran in Shrek Forever After, Francine Rhenquist in The Simpsons episode "Bye Bye Nerdie", Luis Agent Autumn Summerfield in the What's New, Scooby-Doo? episode "The Unnatural").
- November 5:
  - Tilda Swinton, British actress (voice of Wood Sprite in Guillermo del Toro's Pinocchio, Oracle in Isle of Dogs, Ancient One in the What If...? episode "What If... Doctor Strange Lost His Heart Instead of His Hands?").
  - Snežana Bogdanović, Serbian actress (additional voices in Courage the Cowardly Dog).
- November 6: Eddie Korbich, American actor (voice of Al and Moo Sleech in Doug, Flick Duck, Edouard Snooty, Ootsie and Bootsie Snooty in PB&J Otter).
- November 8:
  - Nell Scovell, American television writer (The Simpsons, The Critic, Space Ghost Coast to Coast).
  - Megan Cavanagh, American actress (voice of Judy Neutron in The Adventures of Jimmy Neutron, Boy Genius, Julia in The Real Adventures of Jonny Quest, Luna in Winx Club, Brunhilda in Back at the Barnyard, Stern Fern in The Loud House).
- November 10: Neil Gaiman, English author (voice of Albert the Manservant in Jay & Silent Bob's Super Groovy Cartoon Movie!, Snowball V in The Simpsons episode "Treehouse of Horror XXVIII", himself in the Arthur episode "Falafelosophy" and The Simpsons episode "The Book Job").
- November 11: Stanley Tucci, American actor and filmmaker (voice of Herb Kazzaz in BoJack Horseman, Leonardo da Vinci in Mr. Peabody & Sherman, Giovanni Caproni in The Wind Rises, Boldo in The Tale of Despereaux, Bitsy Brandenham in Central Park, Herb Copperbottom in Robots, Abraham Erskine in the What If...? episode "What If... Captain Carter Were The First Avenger?").
- November 13: Neil Flynn, American actor (voice of XR in Buzz Lightyear of Star Command, Mr. Bannister in Randy Cunningham: 9th Grade Ninja, Jonathan Kent in Superman: Man of Tomorrow, Weather News Network Producer in Cloudy with a Chance of Meatballs, Turpin in the King of the Hill episode "Arlen City Bomber", Max Flush in the Bob's Burgers episode "O.T.: The Outside Toilet").
- November 14: Hana Kukal, Slovak-born Canadian animator (Atkinson Film-Arts, The Raccoons, FernGully: The Last Rainforest, Rupert, Lacewood Productions, Once Upon a Forest, Problem Child, Eight Crazy Nights, The Secret World of Benjamin Bear), storyboard artist (Stickin' Around, Hippo Tub Co., Pound Puppies, Almost Naked Animals, Daniel Tiger's Neighborhood, PAW Patrol) and director (Katie and Orbie, Dirtgirlworld), (d. 2020).
- November 17: RuPaul, American television personality and actor (voice of Mr. X in Amphibia, Queen Chante in The Simpsons episode "Werking Mom").
- November 18: Elizabeth Perkins, American actress (voice of Coral in Finding Nemo, Phyllis in My Little Pony: A New Generation, Jan Shaw, Mrs. Ashmore and Sherilyn in King of the Hill, Aunt May/Quippy Spider-Man in Spider-Man: Across the Spider-Verse).
- November 19: Olivier Jean-Marie, French animator (Robo Story, Albert the 5th Musketeer, Dr. Zitbag's Transylvania Pet Shop), background artist (Clémentine), storyboard artist (Spiff and Hercules, Li'l Elvis and the Truckstoppers, Snow White: The Sequel), writer (Rabbids Invasion) and director (Les Minikeums, Xilam, creator of Zig & Sharko, co-creator of Rolling with the Ronks!), (d. 2021).
- April 27: Javier Fernandez-Peña, Spanish actor (voice of Spanish Buzz in Toy Story 3, additional voices in The Amazing World of Gumball).
- November 24: Julian Nott, British composer and conductor (Wallace & Gromit, The Very Hungry Caterpillar & Other Stories, Christmas Carol: The Movie, Peppa Pig, Ben & Holly's Little Kingdom, Bing).
- November 26: Greg Berg, American actor (voice of Fozzie Bear and Scooter in Muppet Babies, Huckleberry Hound, Moe Wendell, and Joe Wendell in Yo Yogi!).
- November 29:
  - Cathy Moriarty, American actress (voice of Tish Wittenberg in Hey Arnold!, Ruby in Lady and the Tramp II: Scamp's Adventure, Dr. Fitzenberg in the Recess episode "Kids in the Mist", Queen Gina in the Jumanji episode "Perfect Match", Betty in The Tick episode "Ants in Pants!").
  - Heitor Pereira, Brazilian composer, songwriter, musician, arranger, and record producer (Universal Animation Studios, Sony Pictures Animation).

=== December ===
- December 7: Maureen Shelleau, Canadian animator (Nelvana), (d. 2026).
- December 9:
  - Jeff "Swampy" Marsh, American animator (The Simpsons, King of the Hill, The Secret World of Benjamin Bear), storyboard artist (Little Dracula, Rocko's Modern Life, The Ren & Stimpy Show, Dumb and Dumber, The Story of Santa Claus, King of the Hill, Bounty Hamster, Postman Pat), art director (Aaagh! It's the Mr. Hell Show!), director (Rocko's Modern Life) and producer (Pete the Cat, co-creator of Phineas and Ferb and Milo Murphy's Law).
  - Mike Lookinland, American actor, musician and cameraman (voice of Bobby Brady in The Brady Kids, Oblio in The Point!).
- December 10: Kenneth Branagh, English actor and filmmaker (voice of Miguel in The Road to El Dorado).
- December 12: David Metzger, American orchestrator and composer (Walt Disney Animation Studios).
- December 15: Robert E. Stanton, American background artist (Filmation, Alvin and the Chipmunks, Walt Disney Animation Studios, Curious George), (d. 2021).
- December 17: Tarako, Japanese voice actress (voice of Kiara in Inuyasha, Altena in Noir, Scratch in Dragon Ball Z, Boy B in Nausicaä of the Valley of the Wind, Madge in Castle in the Sky, Sugar and Beast Spirit in Urusei Yatsura, provided additional voices for My Neighbor Totoro), (d. 2024).
- December 21: Raymie Muzquiz, American animator, sheet timer (Rugrats, Duckman, The Rugrats Movie), storyboard artist (Klasky Csupo, The Simpsons, Bobby's World, Squirrel Boy, Dinosaur Train) and director (Duckman, Rugrats, The Electric Piper, Hey Arnold!, Drawn Together, Squirrel Boy, Sit Down, Shut Up, Futurama, Napoleon Dynamite, Hey Arnold!: The Jungle Movie, Disenchantment).
- December 23: Mutsumi Inomata, Japanese animator (Fist of the North Star, Urusei Yatsura, Mobile Suit Gundam SEED Destiny, Space Warrior Baldios, Leda: The Fantastic Adventure of Yohko, City Hunter), (d. 2024).
- December 24: Glenn McQueen, Canadian animator (Pixar), (d. 2002).
- December 26: Temuera Morrison, New Zealand actor (voice of Chief Tui in the Moana franchise, Boba Fett in the Star Wars: Visions episode "Tatooine Rhapsody").
- December 28: Jeff Martin, American television writer and producer (The Simpsons, Baby Blues).
- December 31: Chuck Sheetz, American animator, storyboard artist (King of the Hill), sheet timer (The Simpsons, Rocko's Modern Life, Klutter!, Aaahh!!! Real Monsters, Duckman, Recess: School's Out), director (Film Roman, Recess, Welcome to Eltingville, Drawn Together, What's New, Scooby-Doo?, Scooby-Doo! Pirates Ahoy!, Fresh Beat Band of Spies, The Powerpuff Girls, The Adventures of Rocky and Bullwinkle, Llama Llama, Duncanville, The Harper House) and producer (Recess, What's New, Scooby-Doo?, Scooby-Doo! Pirates Ahoy!).

=== Specific date unknown ===
- Michael Rowe, American television writer and producer (ALF Tales, The PJs, Futurama, Family Guy, Brickleberry, Trailer Park Boys: The Animated Series).
- Jon Vitti, American screenwriter and producer (The Simpsons, The Critic, King of the Hill, The Simpsons Movie, Alvin and the Chipmunks, Alvin and the Chipmunks: The Squeakquel, The Angry Birds Movie).
- Sib Ventress, American television writer (Disney Television Animation, Nickelodeon Animation Studio, Animaniacs, Dumb and Dumber, C Bear and Jamal, The Mask, Our Friend, Martin, Sitting Ducks, Tony Hawk in Boom Boom Sabotage, Pound Puppies, Slugterra, Goldie & Bear, Dorothy and the Wizard of Oz, Guardians of the Galaxy, Cannon Busters, Spidey and His Amazing Friends, Octonauts: Above & Beyond).
- Nick Rijgersberg, Canadian animator (It's Punky Brewster, The Nutcracker Prince, The Raccoons, The Ren & Stimpy Show, CINAR, What's with Andy?), storyboard artist (Inspector Gadget, Bob the Builder), overseas supervisor (Conan the Adventurer) and director (CINAR, Bratz: Starrin' & Stylin', Bratz: Passion 4 Fashion Diamondz), (d. 2020).
- Antoine Guilbaud, French-born American animator, storyboard artist (The Angry Beavers, Rugrats, CatDog, Baby Blues, Brandy & Mr. Whiskers, Bionicle 3: Web of Shadows, Camp Lazlo, The Grim Adventures of Billy & Mandy, Phineas and Ferb), character designer (Rugrats), background artist, prop designer (Rocko's Modern Life), color stylist (What a Cartoon!), art director (Oswald), writer (Nickelodeon Animation Studio, Camp Lazlo, The Grim Adventures of Billy & Mandy, Phineas and Ferb, Zip Zip) and producer (creator of Get Blake!).
- Dan Riba, American animator, storyboard artist (Ruby-Spears Enterprises, DIC Entertainment, Warner Bros. Animation, Cartoon Network Studios, Dragons: Race to the Edge, Harvey Girls Forever!), character designer (Batman: The Animated Series, Batman Beyond), sheet timer (Superman: The Animated Series) and director (ALF: The Animated Series, The Super Mario Bros. Super Show!, Warner Bros. Animation, Turok: Son of Stone, Ben 10, DreamWorks Animation Television).
- Wendy Tilby, Canadian animator.

== Deaths ==
=== January ===
- January 26: Riley Thomson, American comics artist and animator (Warner Bros. Cartoons, Walt Disney Company), dies at age 47.

=== May ===
- May 27: Edward Brophy, American comedian and actor (voice of Timothy Q. Mouse in Dumbo), dies at age 65.

=== July ===
- July 21: Al Hoffman, American composer (Walt Disney Animation Studios), dies at age 57.

=== September ===
- September 24: Mátyás Seiber, Hungarian-English composer (Animal Farm, A Short Vision), dies in a road accident at age 55.

=== November ===
- November 14: Walter Catlett, American actor and comedian (voice of J. Worthington Foulfellow in Pinocchio), dies at age 71.

=== Specific date unknown ===
- Helena Smith Dayton, American film director, painter and sculptor, dies at age 76-77.

== See also ==
- 1960 in anime
