= 1964 in anime =

- Years in anime: 1961 1962 1963 1964 1965 1966 1967
- Centuries: 19th century · 20th century · 21st century
- Decades: 1930s 1940s 1950s 1960s 1970s 1980s 1990s
- Years: 1961 1962 1963 1964 1965 1966 1967

The events of 1964 in anime.

== Events ==
NBC Enterprises orders an additional 52 episodes of Astro Boy.

== Releases ==
English name	Japanese name	Type	Demographic	Regions
Mighty Atom: The Brave in Space	鉄腕アトム 宇宙の勇者 (Tetsuwan Atomu: Uchuu no Yuusha)	Movie	Shōnen	JA
Big X	ビッグX (Biggu Ekkusu)	TV	Shōnen	JA
Memory	めもりい (Memorii)	Short	General	JA
Mermaid	人魚 (Ningyo)	Short	General	JA
Samurai Kid	少年忍者風のフジ丸 (Shōnen Ninja Kaze no Fujimaru)	TV	Shōnen	JA
Fujimaru of the Wind: The Mysterious Arabian Doll	少年忍者風のフジ丸 謎のアラビヤ人 - 形 Shōnen Ninja Kaze no Fujimaru: Nazo no Arabiya Ningyou	Movie	Shōnen	JA
Hayato the Zero Fighter	0戦はやと (Zero-sen Hayato)	TV	Shōnen	JA

== See also ==
- 1964 in animation
