= 1960 in anime =

- Years in anime: 1957 1958 1959 1960 1961 1962 1963
- Centuries: 19th century · 20th century · 21st century
- Decades: 1930s 1940s 1950s 1960s 1970s 1980s 1990s
- Years: 1957 1958 1959 1960 1961 1962 1963

The events of 1960 in anime.

== Releases ==
English name	Japanese name	Type	Demographic	Regions
Alakazam the Great	西遊記 (Saiyūki)	Movie	Family, Children	JA, NA
Fashion	ファッション	Short	General	JA
Three Tales	新しい動画 3つのはなし (Atarashii Dōga Mittsu no Hanashi)	TV Short	General	JA

== Births ==
- May 22 - Hideaki Anno, animator, director, artist, screenwriter, actor (Neon Genesis Evangelion).
- October 2 - Shinji Aramaki, director, mechanical designer.
- November 28 - Mitsuo Fukuda, director.

== See also ==
- 1960 in animation
