= 1966 in anime =

- Years in anime: 1963 1964 1965 1966 1967 1968 1969
- Centuries: 19th century · 20th century · 21st century
- Decades: 1930s 1940s 1950s 1960s 1970s 1980s 1990s
- Years: 1963 1964 1965 1966 1967 1968 1969

The events of 1966 in anime.

== Releases ==
English name	Japanese name	Type	Demographic	Regions
Osomatsu-kun	おそ松くん - Osomatsu-kun	TV		JA
Rainbow Battle Team	レインボー戦隊ロビン - Rainbow Sentai Robin	TV		JA
Pirate Prince	海賊王子 - Kaizoku Ouji	TV		JA
Harisu no Kaze	ハリスの旋風 - Harisu no Kaze	TV		JA
Asteroid Mask	遊星仮面 - Yuusei Kamen	TV		JA
Cyborg 009 Movie	サイボーグ009 - Cyborg 009	Movie		JA
Jungle Emperor Leo Movie	ジャングル大帝 劇場版 - Jungle Taitei Movie	Movie		JA
Robotan	ロボタン - Robotan	TV		JA
Onward Leo!	ジャングル大帝・進めレオ - Jungle Taitei: Susume Leo!	TV		JA, NA
Hang On! Marine Kid	がんばれ！マリンキッド - Ganbare! Marine Kid	TV		JA
Pictures at an Exhibition	展覧会の絵 - Tenrankai no E	Movie		JA
Jump Out! Batchiri	とびだせ! バッチリ - Tobidase! Bacchiri	TV		JA
Sally the Witch	魔法使いサリー - Mahou Tsukai Sally	TV		JA
Chim Chim Cher-ee	チムチムチェリー - Chimuchimucheri ChimChimCheree	Short		JA
The Fool	殺人狂時代 - Au Fou!	Short		JA
The Woodpecker Plan	キツツキ計画 - Kitsutsuki Keikaku	Short		JA
Welcome, Aliens	ようこそ宇宙人 Youkoso Uchuujin	Short		JA

== See also ==
- 1966 in animation
