= Doggie March =

- Japanese DVD cover art

Japanese name
- Kanji: わんわん忠臣蔵
Transcriptions
- Revised Hepburn: Wanwan Chūshingura
- Directed by: Akira Daikubara
- Screenplay by: Daisaku Shirakawa; Kei Iijima
- Story by: Osamu Tezuka
- Produced by: Hiroshi Okawa
- Starring: Chiyoko Honma; Fumitake Omura; Hideo Kinoshita; Hideo Sato; Junko Hori; Kazuko Yoshikawa; Kiyoko Yamamoto; Kō Nishimura; Makiko Ito; Ranko Mizuki; Yoshihisa Kamo
- Cinematography: Jiro Yoshimura; Kenji Sugiyama
- Edited by: Ikuzo Inaba
- Music by: Urato Watanabe
- Production company: Toei Animation
- Distributed by: Toei Company
- Release date: December 21, 1963 (Japan)
- Running time: 82 minutes
- Country: Japan
- Language: Japanese

Doggie March (Japanese: わんわん忠臣蔵, Hepburn: Wanwan Chūshingura) is a 1963 Japanese animated adventure comedy-drama film directed by Akira Daikubara while distributed by Toei Company, Ltd. The film premiered in the same year as another Toei Animation production, Wolf Boy Ken. An apprentice around this time, a pre-fame Hayao Miyazaki worked on in-betweens during the production phase as his first animation gig. The film was released in Japan by Toei on December 21, 1963.

== Plot ==
An Akita puppy named Rock lives in a secluded cabin with his mother Shiro, a protector beloved by the forest animals. One winter night, a wily fox named Akamimi challenges Shiro and leads her to a mountain belonging to his boss Killer, a notorious Bengal tiger, who attacks and mauls her to death. In the spring, Rock mourns the loss of his mother and vows to get revenge.

He travels to a city and finds a troupe of street dogs, who agree to help him. Rumor spreads back to the forest that Rock has raised a large army to challenge Killer, so he dispatches Akamimi to send Rock out to sea in a barrel. A girl rescues him, however, and Rock lives with her. Meanwhile, the forest animals––including Killer and Akamimi––are captured and put into the city zoo. Word reaches Rock, now an adult, that Killer is still capable of terrorizing the other animals, so he travels back to the city and rejoins his gang. Together with his forest friends, they summon dogs from around town and challenge the large zoo animals. Eventually, Rock and Killer duel on a speeding rollercoaster, and Killer plummets to the ground. With everyone free from danger, the dogs march down a city street in celebration.

== Cast ==
- Young Rock/Girl in the lighthouse - Junko Hori
- Adult Rock - Hideo Kinoshita
- Shiro - Mizuki Ranoko
- Young Karu - Kitagawa Mari
- Adult Karu - Chiyoko Honma
- Goro - Hideo Sato
- Nukiya - Sakae Umezu
- Killer - Akira Nishimura
- Akamimi - Kamo Kikuhisa
- Rabbit - Makiko Ito
- Ron - Kazuko Yoshikawa
- Rima - Kiyoko Yamamoto
- Stray Dogs - Hanazawa Tokuho, Unno Yori, and Nishito Taika

== See also ==
- List of animated feature films of the 1960s
