= Mexican Mousepiece =

- Directed by: Robert McKimson
- Story by: David Detiege
- Produced by: David H. DePatie; Friz Freleng
- Starring: Mel Blanc; Ralph James
- Edited by: Al Wahrman
- Music by: Bill Lava
- Animation by: George Grandpre; Bob Matz; Manny Perez
- Layouts by: Dick Ung
- Backgrounds by: Tom O'Loughlin
- Color process: Technicolor
- Production company: DePatie–Freleng Enterprises
- Distributed by: Warner Bros. Pictures
- Release date: February 26, 1966 (U.S.)
- Running time: 6:20
- Language: English

Mexican Mousepiece is a 1966 Warner Bros. Merrie Melodies cartoon directed by Robert McKimson. The short was released on February 26, 1966, and stars Daffy Duck and Speedy Gonzales.

== Plot ==
Daffy's house is being invaded by mice. He decides to get rid of them by sending them across the sea so some starving cats can eat them. He does this first by attempting to gain their trust, by pretending to be nice. When the mice fall for the trap, one of them telephones Speedy Gonzales for help.

Now aware of Daffy's scheme, Speedy has one to counter it. He tricks Daffy into jumping into a box of fireworks with a lit match, which injures Daffy. The mice fall for the trap again afterwards, but Speedy whacks Daffy's foot and the mice then go to the other side of a cliff to get away from Daffy.

Daffy tries one last scheme which involves catapulting himself across the gap between cliffs. It doesn't go so well and he is flattened. Speedy then tells the mice that they should send him overseas, hoping they'll be looking for "pressed duck".

== Note ==
This cartoon reuses the animated flying sequence from Stupor Duck (1956).
