= List of anime by release date (1946–1959) =

This is a list of anime by release date which covers Japanese animated productions that were made between 1946 and 1959. After World War II, Japan was occupied by the allies which mainly consisted of the Americans. During the shift from the Empire of Japan to a democracy, the animation industry continued producing new animated films. The first anime broadcast on TV did not come though until 1958 when Mole's Adventure was released. This marked two major milestones as it was also the first ever color animation in the country. The first full-length color animation was also released in 1958 with the title The Tale of the White Serpent, in America it was also known as Panda and the Magic Serpent. Animated television series were later released in the 1960s which include Astro Boy, the first major successful anime.

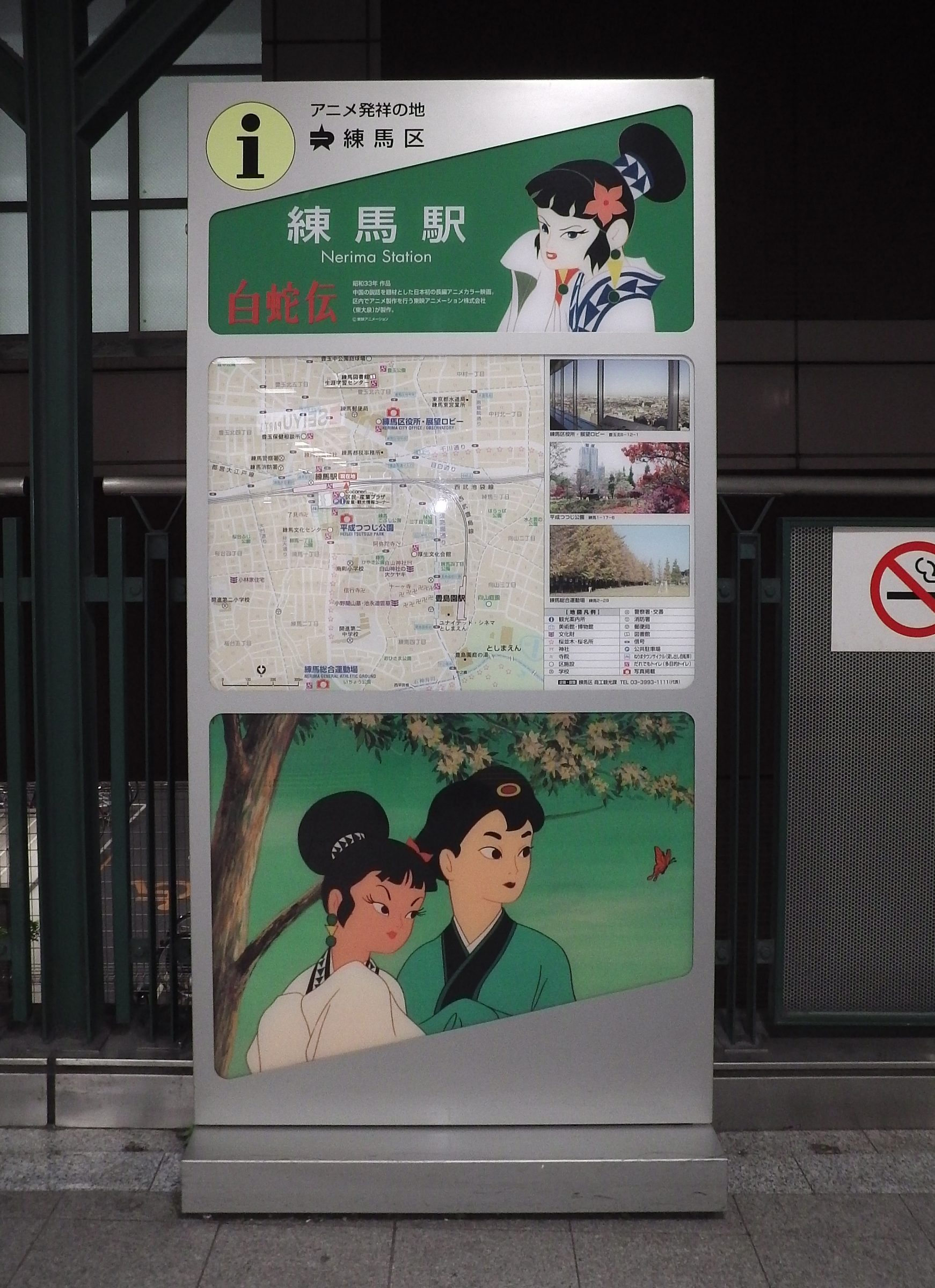
The White Snake Enchantress monument in Nerima City, Tokyo

English name	Japanese name	Romaji	Format	Original Release Date
Spider Thread (Spider Silk)	蜘蛛の糸（蜘蛛の絲）	Kumonoito	Short film	1946
Cherry Blossom: Spring's Fantasy	桜 - 春の幻想	Sakura: Haru no Gensou	Short film	1946
The Magic Pen	魔法のペン	Mahou no Pen	Short film	1946
Abandoned Cat Little Tora	すて猫トラちゃん	Suteneko Tora-chan	Short film	1947
Snowy Nights Dream	雪の夜の夢	Yukinoyonoyume	Short film	1947
Story of the Muku Tree	ムクの木の話	Muku no ki no hanashi	Short film	1947
The Coconut	椰子の実	Yashi no mi	Short film	1947
The Little Match Girl	マッチ賣りの少女	Matchi uri no Shoujo	Short film	1947
Trouble in the Forest	–	Niwatori to Tomodachi	Short film	1947
A Turtle in the Pot	甕中捉龞	–	Short film	1948
Carry the Hatchet	鉞担いで	Masakari katsuide	Short film	1948
Poppoya: Carefree Stationmaster	–	Poppoya-san: Nonki Ekicho no Maki	Short film	1948
Princess of Baghdad	バグダッド姫	Bagudaddo-hime	Short film	1948
The Bear Dodger	熊に喰われぬ男	Kuma ni Kuwarenu Otoko	Short film	1948
Tora-chan and the Bride	トラちゃんと花嫁	Tora-chan to Hanayome	Short film	1948
Animal Baseball Match	動物大野球戦	Dobutsu Daiyakyu-sen	Short film	1949
Gauche the Cellist	セロひきのゴーシュ	Sero Hiki no Gōshu	Short film	1949
The King's Tail	王様のしっぽ	Ousama no Shippo	Short film	1949
Gulliver's Great Activities	ガリヴァー奮闘記	Gulliver Funtouki	Short film	1950
Thank You, Kitty	ありがとう、キティ	Arigatō, Kiti	Short film	1950
Tora-chan and the Insect	トラちゃんのカンカン虫	Tora-chan no Kankan Mushi	Short film	1950
Adam and Eve	アダムとイブ	Adam to Eve	Short film	1951
Ponsuke no Udekurabe	ポン助の腕くらべ	Ponsuke no Udekurabe	Short film	1951
Detective of the Ball	団子兵衛捕物帖 開けーごまの巻	Dangobetori monocho hirakegoma no maki	Short film	1952
The Whale	くじら	Kujira	Short film	1952
The Forest Concert	森の音楽会	Mori no Ongakukai	Short film	1953
The Flower and the Butterfly	花と蝶	Hana to Chou	Short film	1954
Kojiki Excerpts of the Iwato Open	古事記抄 天の岩戸開きの巻	Kojiki sho: Amano iwato-biraki no maki	Short film	1955
Piggyback Ghost	おんぶおばけ	Onbu Obake	Short film	1955
The One-Legged Cricket	一本足のきりぎりす	Ippon Ashi no Kirigirisu	Short film	1955
Beer Those Were the Days	–	Biru mukashi mukashi	Short film	1956
The Black Woodcutter and the White Woodcutter	黒いきこりと白いきこり	Kuroi Kikori to Shiroi Kikori	Short film	1956
Five Little Monkeys	五匹の子猿たち	Gohiki no kozaru-tachi	Short film	1956
Ghost Ship	幽霊船	Yuurei-sen	Short film	1956
Sambo's Tiger Conquest	ちびくろさんぼのとらたいじ	Chibikuro Sambo no tora taiji	Short film	1956
The Legend of the Dragon	古事記物語 第貮篇 八岐大蛇退治	Kojiki monogatari dai nihen: Yamatano-orochi taiji	Short film	1956
The Melon Princess and the Amanojaku	瓜子姫とあまのじゃく	Uriko Hime to Amanojaku	Short film	1956
Fukusuke	ふくすけ	Fukusuke	Short film	1957
Kitten's Scribbling / Kitty's Graffiti	こねこのらくがき	Koneko no Rakugaki	Short film	1957
The Magic Drum	ふしぎな太鼓	Fushigi na Daiko	Short film	1957
Korochan, the Little Bear	こぐまのコロちゃん	Koguma no Koro-chan	Short film	1958
Mole's Adventure	もぐらのアバンチュール	Mogura no Adventure	TV film	1958
The White Snake Enchantress	白蛇伝	Hakujaden	Feature film	1958
Kitty's Studio	こねこのスタジオ	Koneko no Studio	Short film	1959
Magic Boy	少年猿飛佐助	Shounen Sarutobi Sasuke	Feature film	1959
The Sparrow in the Empty Pumpkin	ひょうたんすずめ	Hyoutan Suzume	Short film	1959

== Notable births ==
- August 19, 1948 - Toshio Suzuki, producer.
- January 29, 1950 - Katsuhito Akiyama, animation director, screenwriter, storyboard artist
- October 10, 1955 - Tetsurō Amino, director
- January 13, 1956 - Akitaro Daichi, director, producer, photography director
- 1959 - Koichi Chigira, animator, director, writer

== See also ==
- List of anime by release date (pre-1939)
- List of anime by release date (1939–1945)
- 1960 in anime
- History of anime
- List of years in animation
