= Mole's Adventure =

1958 Japanese animated film

もぐらのアバンチュール (Mogura no Abanchūru)
- Genre: Science fiction
- Anime television film
- Directed by: Hiroshi Washizumi
- Music by: Naozumi Yamamoto
- Original network: NTV
- Released: July 14, 1958
- Runtime: 9 minutes

Mole's Adventure (もぐらのアバンチュール, Mogura no Abanchūru) is the earliest surviving Japanese anime broadcast on television. Originally airing on July 14, 1958, on NTV and again on October 15, 1958, the nine-minute animation was the first televised Japanese animation and the first example of a full color broadcast.

== Plot ==
Mole's Adventure is about a mole, who is bothered by the sun's light. So, he decides to leave the Earth in a rocket ship. He lands on a strange planet, where he travels over the land on a set of skis. He meets and is bothered by the planet's weird creatures, which live above & below the planet's soil. After using a flashlight to make the creatures scatter, he is then hit by the sun's rays again, causing him to fall off the planet. While falling, the mole wakes up, realizing it was all just a dream.
