= Saverio Indrio =

Italian voice actor (1963–2025)

- Born: Saverio Maria Indrio; 19 June 1963; Taranto, Italy
- Died: 30 June 2025 (aged 62); Rome, Italy
- Occupations: Actor; voice actor; dubbing director
- Years active: 1980–2025

Saverio Maria Indrio (19 June 1963 – 30 June 2025) was an Italian voice actor. He was also active in radio and television.

== Biography ==
Indrio was born 19 June 1963 in Taranto, beginning his career in the entertainment world as a musician, performing as a classical guitarist. He then approached the theater, appearing in La bottega del teatro directed by Guglielmo Ferraiola and organized by the Teatro Abeliano in Bari.

As a theatrical performer, he acted in works by Frank Wedekind, Luigi Pirandello, Dario Fo, Gianni Rodari, Oscar Wilde and Anton Chekhov.

He also dubbed various actors' roles into Italian, including Dwayne Johnson and Kevin McNally. He also voiced several cartoon characters: being the Italian voice of Avery Bullock from the eighth to the twentieth season of American Dad!, following the death of Sergio Tedesco. He also voiced Sully in Monsters University, replacing Adalberto Maria Merli (being the prequel to Monsters Inc.). In The Simpsons, he was the voice of Mayor Quimby, from the fifth to the seventh season and from the twenty-fourth to the thirty-sixth season, replacing Fabrizio Temperini.

From 2011 to 2021, he voiced William H. Macy in the television series Shameless.

== Death ==
Indrio died suddenly in Rome, on 30 June 2025, at the age of 62.
