= Robo Story =

Robo Story (sometimes referred to as Robostory) is a French animated children's television series that was created by Michel Pillyser and Bernard Kessler for the French production company Belokapi and first televised in 1985. It ran for 52 episodes that were each 13 minutes long, (each actual story ran for about 25 minutes each so there may only be 26 true episodes depending on the format it is presented in).

The series was subsequently broadcast internationally, including an English dubbed version that was shown on Australian and British TV.

== Summary ==
Robo Story follows the adventures of a small, orange-haired girl called Myrtille and her dog Loufi. In the opening title sequence we see Myrtille chase the mischievous Loufi onto a Space Shuttle that takes off with her inside. The ship crash lands on a world known as the Green Planet.

The Green Planet is inhabited by robots. In the original French version these were the evil Rotors, and the friendly Robors. English language versions changed this slightly, renaming the evil robots the 'Wrigglers', and the friendly robots the 'Robos'.

=== Wrigglers ===
The Wrigglers are black and spindly, and their torsos are shaped like steel drums, with domed heads that resemble safari hats. They are led by the White Wriggler, whose visor is reminiscent of Darth Vader's helmet. He is in turn instructed by a disembodied voice known as 'Revered Reverence.' White Wriggler's frequent incompetence would lead to him being named the "lowest of the low" by the Revered Reverence and turned black. Despite being the leader of the Wrigglers, White Wriggler is not particularly evil; his incompetence and lack of intelligence often make him more comical than villainous. He is also afraid of Loufi, (called Fluffy in the English version) the sight of whom would often turn him from a hostile dictator into a quivering heap.

=== Robos ===
The Robos are primarily bell-shaped and variously coloured. They are led by a grey, spindly, gentle robot named Old Robot who often uses a cane. Other Robo characters include Robot Colossus, Robot Moron, Robot Radar, Robot Magician and Robot Hobo.

Robot Moron is a yellow naive robot who shows common sense but typically answers "I don't know" to any question he was asked. On some occasions he would philosophise, and when asked by the other Robos what he was talking about, would answer once more "I don't know."

Robot Hobo is Old Robot's brother and has a similar appearance, but with a teal body and a purple hat and satchel. He is intelligent and articulate, and although he can be very helpful, he spends much of his time lazing about and getting drunk on oil.

Robot Pasha is a green coloured military Robo who frequently says military phrases such as "Roger, over and out" in casual conversation. Because of his wartime experience and constant militaristic attitude, he sometimes foolishly tries attacking the Wrigglers, resulting in the other Robos restraining him.

Robot Radar is a blue coloured robot whose upper half could flip open to reveal a radar dish. With this, he can both act as a spy on the Wrigglers or provide entertainment by picking up signals and acting as a television set.

Robot Magician is a legend among the other Robos who would occasionally appear to save the day. In one episode, when the Wrigglers had amassed an army to crush the Robos once and for all, Robot Magician sent all the Wrigglers into orbit and drove their leader insane.

The series revolved around Myrtille (or 'Blueberry' as she was known in the English version) trying to get to her space shuttle (which the Wrigglers had stolen) so she could return to Earth. A running gag in the series was that Myrtille/Blueberry was sometimes referred to as the "girl-man" due to the Robos originally misidentifying her as a man. In the final episode Robot Magician sneaked into the Wriggler's headquarters and deactivated the central computer (the Revered Reverence). White Wriggler is afterwards seen with Myrtille/Blueberry as she is preparing to return to Earth. He has apparently made peace with the Robos, suggesting that he never had evil intentions and was only acting out of fear of the Revered Reverence. Myrtille plans to bring the Robos back to Earth with her, but the shuttle accidentally launches with only her and Robot Hobo on board. As they speed away from the Green Planet she turns and sees that Robot Hobo has become Robot Magician, who he actually was all along.

The series employed an idiosyncratic style of animation, notable especially for its intentionally rough, textural background art and sparse, industrial soundtrack.
