= Wolf Boy Ken =

Japanese anime television series

- Theatrical release poster for the second compilation film.
- Directed by: Sadao Tsukioka; Isao Takahata
- Music by: Asei Kobayashi
- Country of origin: Japan
- Original language: Japanese
- No. of episodes: 86

Production
- Production company: Toei Animation

Original release
- Network: NET
- Release: November 25, 1963 – August 16, 1965

Wolf Boy Ken (狼少年ケン, Ōkami Shōnen Ken) is the first anime series produced by Toei Animation (then Toei Doga). The series is known for having more frames per second than other anime of the same time. The series also implemented sponsorship by a large corporation, in this case, Morinaga Candy Company. An English dub was created to air in America, but was never released. The English dub featured the voices of Daws Butler and Don Messick. The English dub only aired on television in Australia in March 1967.

== Plot ==
Ken is a young boy who was raised by wolves (similar to Mowgli) in a jungle in the Himalayan Mountains. One day, a meteor hits the jungle, causing a drastic change. This eventually leads to famine and a need for certain animals to relocate. Ken tries to help the animals as much as possible, in particular, he watches over two young wolf cubs named Chichi and Poppo. Jack, a one-eyed wolf, doesn't like Ken as he is a human living among them. One day, Ken saves Jack's life. Jack later has the opportunity to let Ken die when he is bitten by a poisonous snake, but decides to return the favor and save his life instead. This mutual affair causes a friendship to form between the two, and they team up to save the other animals from predators and humans.

== Characters ==
- Yuuji Nishimoto as Ken
- Kenji Utsumi as Jack
- Hiroshi Masuoka as Kuma
- Hiroshi Ohtake as Black
- Jouji Yanami as Boss
- Kazue Tagami as Chicchi
- Yoko Mizugaki as Poppo
- Keiko Yamamoto as Wally
- Reiko Katsura as Dorothy
- Takuzou Kamiyama as Gorilla
