= 1962 in anime =

The events of 1962 in anime.

== Accolades ==
- Ōfuji Noburō Award: Tale of a Street Corner

== Releases ==
English name	Japanese name	Type	Demographic	Regions
Sindbad the Sailor	アラビアンナイト・シンドバッドの冒険 (Arabian Naito: Shindobatto no Bōken)	Movie	Family, Children	JA, NA, EU
Love	愛 (Ai)	Short	General	JA
Human Zoo	人間動物園 (Ningen Dōbutsuen)	Short	General	JA
Male	おす (Osu)	Short	General	JA
Manga Calendar	おとぎマンガカレンダー (Otogi Manga Calendar)	TV	General	JA
Otogi's Voyage Around the World	おとぎの世界旅行 (Otogi no Sekai Ryoko)	Movie	Family, Children	JA
Tales of the Street Corner	ある街角の物語 (Aru Machi Kado no Monogatari)	Movie	General	JA

== Births ==
- March 24 - Kazuki Akane, director
- May 31 - Noriko Hidaka, voice actress

== See also ==
- 1962 in animation
