= 1936 in animation =

Events in 1936 in animation.

== Events ==
=== January ===
- January 4: David Hand's Mickey's Polo Team premieres, produced by the Walt Disney Animation Studios. It stars Mickey Mouse, Donald Duck, Goofy, various other Disney characters, and caricatures of Hollywood celebrities like Charlie Chaplin, Laurel & Hardy and Harpo Marx.
- January 17: Somewhere in Dreamland, directed and produced by the Fleischer Brothers, is their first cartoon in three-strip Technicolor.
- January 31: The animated short Betty Boop and the Little King, directed and produced by the Fleischer Brothers, premieres, being a crossover between Betty Boop and Otto Soglow's newspaper comic The Little King.

=== February ===
- February 7: The Felix the Cat cartoon The Goose That Laid the Golden Egg premieres. This marks the first Felix cartoon since 1930's Tee Time and the first without Felix's original creator Pat Sullivan as he died of alcoholism and pneumonia in 1933. Felix's character was modified to a more child-like character due to the mandated Hays Office Code as his previous incarnation was considered adult. This incarnation was not well-received as the Felix the Cat film series ended after Bold King Cole three months later.

=== March ===
- March 5: 8th Academy Awards: Three Orphan Kittens, directed by David Hand and produced by Walt Disney Animation Studios, wins the Academy Award for Best Animated Short Film.
- March 7:
  - Hugh Harman's The Old Mill Pond premieres, produced by MGM. It features caricatures of various famous jazz musicians like Cab Calloway, Louis Armstrong and Fats Waller.
  - Tex Avery's Page Miss Glory, produced by Leon Schlesinger Productions, premieres.
- March 27: Betty Boop and Little Jimmy, directed and produced by the Fleischer Brothers, premieres, being a crossover between Betty Boop and Jimmy Swinnerton's series Little Jimmy.
- March 28: Wilfred Jackson's Elmer Elephant, produced by Walt Disney Animation Studios, premieres.

=== April ===
- April 4: Tex Avery's The Blow Out, produced by Leon Schlesinger Productions, premieres. It marks the first cartoon in which side character Porky Pig has a starring role.
- April 30: Tex Avery's Porky Pig cartoon Plane Dippy, produced by Leon Schlesinger Productions, premieres. This was the final appearance of the Looney Tunes star Beans, as Porky would soon take his place.

=== May ===
- May 2: Friz Freleng's Let It Be Me premieres, produced by Leon Schlesinger Productions. The cartoon features a caricature of popular singer Bing Crosby; however, the real Crosby found this portrayal of him offensive and tried to stop distribution of the short.
- May 16: Tex Avery's I'd Love to Take Orders from You premieres, produced by Leon Schlesinger Productions.
- May 30:
  - Friz Freleng's Bingo Crosbyana premieres, produced by Leon Schlesinger Productions. Like Let It Be Me, it features a caricature of Bing Crosby, which the real Crosby found offensive, resulting in him trying to stop distribution of the short.
  - David Hand's Mickey Mouse cartoon Thru the Mirror is first released, produced by Walt Disney Animation Studios. In this cartoon, Mickey dreams that he travels through his mirror and in a memorable scene, dances with a pack of playing cards.

=== June ===
- June 20:
  - Wilfred Jackson's Mickey Mouse cartoon Mickey's Rival premieres, produced by Walt Disney Animation Studios. Mickey Mouse is pitted against Mortimer Mouse, who tries to fancy his girlfriend Minnie Mouse.
  - Ben Sharpsteen's Moving Day is released, produced by the Walt Disney Animation Studios, starring Mickey Mouse, Donald Duck and Goofy. In the cartoon the characters move out all their furniture, with a memorable scene in which Goofy fights a living piano.

=== July ===
- July 18: Tex Avery's I Love to Singa premieres, produced by Leon Schlesinger Productions.
- Specific date unknown: Carl Stalling is hired as composer for Leon Schlesinger Productions.

=== August ===
- August 1: Tex Avery's Porky Pig cartoon Porky the Rain-Maker premieres, produced by Leon Schlesinger Productions.
- August 8: Friz Freleng's Sunday Go to Meetin' Time premieres, produced by Leon Schlesinger Productions.
- August 10–31: 4th Venice International Film Festival:
  - David Hand's Who Killed Cock Robin, produced by the Walt Disney Animation Studios, wins the award for Best Animation.
  - Len Lye's experimental animated film A Colour Box is shown, but causes a riot among Nazi supporters who label it degenerate art and protest the film. They stomp their feet loudly, leading to the three-minute film being stopped before its completion.
- August 22: Frank Tashlin's Porky Pig cartoon Porky's Poultry Plant premieres, produced by Leon Schlesinger Productions.

=== October ===
- October 3: Tex Avery's Porky Pig cartoon Milk and Money premieres, produced by Leon Schlesinger Productions.
- October 10: Friz Freleng's Boulevardier from the Bronx premieres, produced by Leon Schlesinger Productions. It is the first Warner Bros. Cartoon to use Merrily We Roll Along as its theme song.
- October 31: Wilfred Jackson's The Country Cousin, produced by Walt Disney Animation, is first released.

=== November ===
- November 7: Tex Avery's Don't Look Now is first released, produced by Leon Schlesinger Productions.
- November 27: Popeye the Sailor Meets Sindbad the Sailor, produced and directed by The Fleischer Brothers, is first released. It is the first Popeye the Sailor cartoon over 16 minutes long and in color.
- November 28: Friz Freleng's The Coo-Coo Nut Grove is first released, produced by Leon Schlesinger Productions. The cartoon features various caricatures of Hollywood celebrities.

=== December ===
- December 5: Tex Avery's Porky Pig cartoon The Village Smithy premieres, produced by Leon Schlesinger Productions.

=== Specific date unknown ===
- Carlo Campogalliani's The Four Musketeers is first released.
- Len Lye's Rainbow Dance is released, a combination of live-action and animation.
- Mikhail Tsekhanovsky and Vera Tsekhanovskaya's The Tale of the Priest and of His Workman Balda is abandoned halfway through production and never finished.
- Raoul Verdini and Umberto Spano's The Adventures of Pinocchio is an animated film which is never completed, because of technical problems.

== Births ==
=== January ===
- January 2: Roger Miller, American singer and actor (voice of Alan-a-Dale in Robin Hood), (d. 1992).
- January 6: Corinne Orr, Canadian actress (voice of Trixie in Speed Racer).
- January 23: Arlene Golonka, American actress (voice of Debbie in Speed Buggy, Queen in The Super Powers Team: Galactic Guardians episode "The Wild Cards", additional voices in The New Yogi Bear Show and The New Scooby-Doo Movies), (d. 2021).
- January 31: Philippe Laudenbach, French actor (voice of the Devil in The Girl Without Hands, French dub voice of the Narrator in Minions), (d. 2024).

=== February ===
- February 11: Burt Reynolds, American actor (voice of Charlie B. Barkin in All Dogs Go to Heaven, Senator Buckingham in American Dad!, Judge Keaton in the Duckman episode "Das Sub", M.F. Thatherton in the King of the Hill episode "The Company Man"), (d. 2018).
- February 12: Paul Shenar, American actor and theater director (voice of Jenner in The Secret of NIMH), (d. 1989).
- February 22: Elizabeth MacRae, American actress (voice of Ladyfish in The Incredible Mr. Limpet), (d. 2024).
- February 29: Alex Rocco, American actor (voice of Roger Meyers, Jr. in The Simpsons, Thorny in A Bug's Life, Larry in Pepper Ann, Bea Arthur and Soccer Mom in Family Guy, Carmine Falcone in Batman: Year One, Mr. Malone in the Bonkers episode "Frame That Toon", Lucky Rabbit in The Angry Beavers episode "Big Fun", Old Caddie in The Life & Times of Tim episode "The Caddy's Shack", additional voices in Lloyd in Space), (d. 2015).

=== March ===
- March 5: Dean Stockwell, American actor (voice of Duke Nukem in Captain Planet and the Planeteers, adult Tim Drake in Batman Beyond: Return of the Joker), (d. 2021).
- March 9:
  - Marty Ingels, American actor and comedian (voice of the title character in Pac-Man, Hathi in The Jungle Book: Mowgli's Story, Beegle Beagle in The Great Grape Ape Show, Autocat in Cattanooga Cats), (d. 2015).
  - Elina Salo, Finnish actress (Finnish dub voice of Little My in Moomin), (d. 2025).
- March 15: Paul Fierlinger, Czech-American animator, and director (Teeny Little Super Guy, My Dog Tulip), (d. 2025).
- March 16: Elisabeth Volkmann, German actress and comedian (dub voice of Marge Simpson and Patty and Selma in The Simpsons), (d. 2006).
- March 17: Patty Maloney, American actress (voice of Tanis the Mummy in Scooby-Doo and the Ghoul School, Darla in The Little Rascals, Blue Eyes in The Smurfs, Mrs. Segar in The New Batman Adventures episode "Double Talk", provided additional voices for The Lord of the Rings), (d. 2025).
- Specific date unknown: Hu Jinqing, Chinese animator and director (The Fight Between the Snipe and the Clam, Calabash Brothers), (d. 2019).

=== April ===
- April 9: Pam Hyatt, Canadian actress (voice of Kaede in Inuyasha, Noble Heart Horse in Care Bears Movie II: A New Generation, Aunt Bozzie in Ewoks).
- April 10: John Madden, American football player, coach and sports commentator (voiced himself in The Simpsons episode "Sunday, Cruddy Sunday"), (d. 2021).
- April 12: Charles Napier, American actor (voice of Duke Phillips in The Critic, General Hardcastle in the DC Animated Universe, Cooley in the Buzz Lightyear of Star Command episode "Haunted Moon", original voice of the Sheriff in Squidbillies), (d. 2011).
- April 20: Lisa Davis, English-American former actress (voice of Anita Ratcliffe in One Hundred and One Dalmatians).
- April 22: Glen Campbell, American guitarist, singer, songwriter, actor and television host (voice of Chanticleer in Rock-a-Doodle), (d. 2017).
- April 21: Avo Paistik, Estonian animated film director, animator and illustrator (Lend, Tolmuimeja, Klaabu, Nipi ja tige kala, Klaabu kosmoses, Naksitrallid, Naksitrallid II), (d. 2013).
- April 22: Eiko Masuyama, Japanese voice actress (voice of Fujiko Mine in Lupin III, Joan Randell in Captain Future, Cutie Honey in Cutie Honey, Princess Snow Kaguya in Sailor Moon S: The Movie, Little Lulu in Little Lulu and Her Little Friends, Japanese dub voice of Melody Valentine in Josie and the Pussycats), (d. 2024).
- April 24: Eladio González Garza, Mexican voice actor (Latin American voice of Robin, The Atom, The Flash, Bizarro, Captain Cold, Gorilla Grodd and Hawkman in Super Friends, The Joker in The New Adventures of Batman, Jimmy Olsen in Superman, Ronald Radford III in Fred and Barney Meet the Thing, Lok in Valley of the Dinosaurs, Station in Lloyd in Space), (d. 2026).

=== May ===
- May 12: Klaus Doldinger, German composer (Peter in Magicland), (d. 2025).
- May 13: Arthur Lipsett, Canadian film director and animator (Very Nice, Very Nice, 21-87, A Trip Down Memory Lane), (d. 1986).
- May 17: Mark Hall, English animator and film producer (Cosgrove Hall Films, Danger Mouse), (d. 2011).
- May 23: Charles Kimbrough, American actor (voice of Victor in The Hunchback of Notre Dame and The Hunchback of Notre Dame II, Mort Chalk in Recess: School's Out, Rainbow Face #1 in The Land Before Time VII: The Stone of Cold Fire, Dr. Bob in the Mighty Max episode "Scorpio Rising", Sandy Dreckman in the Pinky and the Brain episode "You'll Never Eat Food Pellets in This Town Again!", Jim Dial in the Family Guy episode "A Picture is Worth $1,000 Bucks", Stage Gordon in the Batman Beyond episode "Out of the Past", Pat Jensen in The Zeta Project episode "On the Wire", narrator in The Angry Beavers episode "Canucks Amuck", additional voices in Whisper of the Heart), (d. 2023).
- May 25: Gary Foster, American composer (DuckTales the Movie: Treasure of the Lost Lamp, Aladdin, A Bug's Life, Monsters, Inc., Finding Nemo, The Adventures of Tintin, The Hunchback of Notre Dame, Ice Age, Robots, Chicken Little), (d. 2026).
- May 27: Louis Gossett Jr., American actor (voice of King Zahn in Delgo, Lucius Fox in The Batman, Commander Clash in Captain Planet and the Planeteers, Sergeant Angryman in the Family Guy episode "Saving Private Brian", Chiron in the Hercules episode "Hercules and the Caledonian Boar"), (d. 2024).

=== June ===
- June 1: Gerald Scarfe, English cartoonist and illustrator (Pink Floyd – The Wall, Hercules).
- June 4: Bruce Dern, American actor (voice of Yoshio Onodera in From Up on Poppy Hill, Randy Strickland in the King of the Hill episode "Boxing Luanne").
- June 6: Levi Stubbs, American baritone singer (voice of Mother Brain in Captain N: The Game Master), (d. 2008).
- June 8: James Darren, American actor and signer (voice of Jimmy Darrock in The Flintstones episode "Surfin' Fred", singing voice of Yogi Bear in Hey There, It's Yogi Bear!), (d. 2024).
- June 19: Takeshi Aono, Japanese actor (voice of Shiro Sanada in Space Battleship Yamato, Kami and King Piccolo in the Dragon Ball franchise, Rihaku in Fist of the North Star, Japanese dub voice of Joker in the DC Animated Universe, King Harold in the Shrek franchise, Uncle Max in The Lion King 1½, and Sir Topham Hatt in Thomas & Friends), (d. 2012).
- June 20: Derek Lamb, English animator and film producer (Special Delivery, Every Child, Mystery!, Sports Cartoons, Sesame Street, played himself in Ryan), (d. 2005).
- June 22:
  - Kris Kristofferson, American actor and musician (voice of Doc in The Land Before Time VI: The Secret of Saurus Rock, Old Donkey in The Star, Pops in the Handy Manny episode "Motorcycle Adventure"), (d. 2024).
  - John Korty, American film director and animator (Sesame Street, Twice Upon a Time, Vegetable Soup), (d. 2022).
- June 27: Shirley Anne Field, English actress (voice of the Governess in A Monkey's Tale), (d. 2023).

=== July ===
- July 9: Hiroshi Sasagawa, Japanese animator and illustrator (Speed Racer, Science Ninja Team Gatchaman, Time Bokan).
- July 24: Ruth Buzzi, American actress and comedian (voice of Granny Goodwitch in Linus the Lionhearted, Gladys in Baggy Pants and the Nitwits, Mama Bear in The Berenstain Bears, Nose Marie in Pound Puppies, Felonia Funk in Rockin' with Judy Jetson, Suzie Kabloozie and Feff in Sesame Street, Delilah in Sheep in the Big City, Nandy in Cro, singing voice of Frou-Frou in The Aristocats), (d. 2025).
- July 30: John P. Ryan, American actor (voice of 'Buzz' Bronski in Batman: Mask of the Phantasm), (d. 2007).

=== August ===
- August 8: Tom Georgeson, British actor (voice of Jacob in the Animated Tales of the World episode "The Enchanted Lion: A Story from Germany"), (d. 2026).
- August 9: Glenn Vilppu, American painter, art instructor, animator (Walt Disney Animation Studios, Marvel Productions) and storyboard artist (Peter Pan & the Pirates, Tiny Toon Adventures).
- August 11:
  - Mitsutoshi Furuya, Japanese manga artist (Dame Oyaji), (d. 2021).
  - Vladimir Samsonov, Russian director (Very Blue Beard), (d. 2024).
- August 12: Elizabeth Shepherd, English actress (voice of Infinity in Silver Surfer, Agatha Harkness in The Avengers: United They Stand episode "The Sorceress's Apprentice").
- August 18: Robert Redford, American actor (voice of Ike the Horse in Charlotte's Web), (d. 2025).
- August 19: Robert Towers, American actor (voice of Cool Kitty in Kidd Video, Snoopy in You're a Good Man, Charlie Brown, Walter Peck in The Real Ghostbusters episode "Big Trouble with Little Slimer").
- August 21: Wilt Chamberlain, American former professional basketball player (voiced himself in the Goober and the Ghost Chasers episode "The Galloping Ghost"), (d. 1999).
- August 31: Martin Rosen, American filmmaker and theater producer (Watership Down, The Plague Dogs).

=== September ===
- September 14: Walter Koenig, American actor (voice of Mr. Savic in Stretch Armstrong and the Flex Fighters, Vladimir Pavel Maximov in The Real Ghostbusters episode "Russian About", himself in the Futurama episode "Where No Fan Has Gone Before"), and screenwriter (Star Trek: The Animated Series), (d. 2026).
- September 15: Yoichi Kotabe, Japanese animator and character designer.
- September 18: Roman Arámbula, Mexican comics artist, animator and lay-out artist (Hanna-Barbera, Pinky and the Brain), (d. 2020).
- September 24: Jim Henson, American puppeteer and animator (Sesame Street, Muppet Babies, Little Muppet Monsters), (d. 1990).
- September 26: Tadao Nagahama, Japanese director (Star of the Giants, Combattler V, Voltes V, Tōshō Daimos, The Rose of Versailles, Ulysses 31), (d. 1980).

=== October ===
- October 9: Brian Blessed, English actor (voice of El Supremo in Freddie as F.R.O.7, Boss Nass in Star Wars Episode I: The Phantom Menace, Clayton in Tarzan, the Pirate King in The Pirates! In an Adventure with Scientists!, Santa Claus in The Amazing World of Gumball and Danger Mouse, Grampy Rabbit in Peppa Pig, General Caous in Asterix and the Big Fight, Charlemagne in Wizards: Tales of Arcadia and Wizards: Rise of the Titans, Eduardo Enormomonster in Henry Hugglemonster, Judge Jawbreaker in Legends of Oz: Dorothy's Return, Prince Vultan in the Family Guy episode "Road to Germany").
- October 25: Masako Nozawa, Japanese actress (voice of Goku in the Dragon Ball franchise).
- October 26: Reiko Okuyama, Japanese animator (Nippon Animation), (d. 2007).
- October 28:
  - Charlie Daniels, American country singer (voiced himself in King of the Hill and VeggieTales), (d. 2020).
  - Carl Davis, American composer and conductor (Ethel & Ernest), (d. 2023).

=== November ===
- November 3: Takao Saitō, Japanese manga artist (Golgo 13), (d. 2021).
- November 19: Dick Cavett, American television personality, comedian and former talk show host (voiced himself in The Simpsons episode "Homie the Clown").

=== December ===
- December 5: John Erwin, American actor (voice of the title character in He-Man and the Masters of the Universe, Reggie Mantle in The Archie Show), (d. 2024).
- December 6: David Ossman, American comedian and actor (voice of Professor Peelie in The Tick, Cornelius in A Bug's Life, Scabies in Osmosis Jones).
- December 8: David Carradine, American actor (voice of Mandrax in Captain Simian & the Space Monkeys, Chief Wulisso in An American Tail: The Treasure of Manhattan Island, Nava in Balto II: Wolf Quest, Mr. Snerz in Hair High, Clockwork in Danny Phantom, Lo Pei in the Jackie Chan Adventures episode "The Warrior Incarnate", Junichiro Hill in the King of the Hill episode "Returning Japanese"), (d. 2009).
- December 22: Héctor Elizondo, American actor (voice of Ioz in The Pirates of Dark Water, Malcho in Aladdin, Lt. Kragger in Justice League and Justice League Unlimited, Bane in Batman: Mystery of the Batwoman, Wan Shi Tong in Avatar: The Last Airbender and The Legend of Korra, Jim Gordon in The Lego Batman Movie, Grandpa Beagle in Mickey Mouse Mixed-Up Adventures, Fiero in Elena of Avalor, Carlos Sanchez in The Book of Life, Dooka in Green Eggs and Ham, Captain Colossus in the Jake and the Never Land Pirates episode "The Legion of Pirate Villains!", King Vicuna in the Go, Diego, Go! episode "Diego Rescues Prince Vicuna", Wishing Wizzle in the Dora the Explorer episode "Dora's Big Birthday Adventure").

=== Specific date unknown ===
- Tony Benedict, American screenwriter (The Flintstones, The Jetsons, Yogi Bear, Huckleberry Hound, The Pink Panther, Looney Tunes, Heathcliff, Saturday Supercade, Mr. Magoo, Popeye), (d. 2025).
- Antonio Canal, Spanish actor (Spanish dub voice of Winnie-the-Pooh in the Winnie the Pooh franchise, Kaa in The Jungle Book 2, Mayor Adam West in Family Guy), (d. 2026).

== Deaths ==
=== December ===
- December: R. E. O'Callaghan, English vegetarianism activist, lecturer and writer (O'Callaghan gained recognition for his effective lectures on vegetarianism, often enhanced with illustrations by using a magic lantern), dies at age 81.
