= 1889 in animation =

Events in 1889 in animation.

== Events ==
- January 14: Charles-Émile Reynaud receives a French patent for his animated moving picture system Théâtre Optique. He also received a British patent for the system on February 8. The system was displayed at the world's fair Exposition Universelle (May-October, 1889) in Paris.

== Births ==
=== January ===
- January 1: Count Cutelli, Italian-American actor (provided sound effects for various 1930s Hollywood cartoons), (d. 1944).

=== February ===
- February 4: Walter Catlett, American actor and comedian (voice of J. Worthington Foulfellow in Pinocchio), (d. 1960).

=== March ===
- March 3: William Pennell, American singer and actor (original voice of Bluto in Popeye), (d. 1956).
- March 18: Gene Byrnes, American cartoonist (created the long-running comic strip Reg'lar Fellers, which received the animated adaptations Happy Days by Ub Iwerks and Boy Meets Dog! by Walter Lantz), (d. 1974).
- March 23: Mario Gallina, Italian actor (Italian voice of J. Worthington Foulfellow in Pinocchio, the Ringmaster in Dumbo), (d. 1950).
- March 30: Herman Bing, German-American actor (voice of the Ringmaster in Dumbo), (d. 1947).

=== June ===
- June 2: Martha Wentworth, American actress (voice of Madam Mim in The Sword in the Stone, Mama Katzenjammer in The Captain and the Kids, and Nanny, Queenie and Lucy in One Hundred and One Dalmatians), (d.1974).
- June 7: Mikhail Tsekhanovsky, Russian animation director, illustrator, screenwriter and sculptor (Post, The Tale of the Priest and of His Workman Balda, The Tale of the Fisherman and the Fish, The Frog Princess, The Wild Swans), (d. 1965).
- June 27: Moroni Olsen, American actor (voice of Magic Mirror in Snow White and the Seven Dwarfs), (d. 1954).

=== July ===
- July 31: Frans Masereel, Belgian painter, graphic artist, and wood engraver (The Idea), (d. 1972).

=== November ===
- November 5: Charles Mintz, American film producer and distributor (Winkler Pictures, Oswald the Lucky Rabbit), (d. 1939).
- November 30: Ramsay Hill, British actor (voice of Labrador Retriever and TV Announcer in One Hundred and One Dalmatians), (d. 1976).

== Sources ==
- Bendazzi, Giannalberto (1994). Cartoons: One hundred years of cinema animation. Indiana University Press. ISBN 0253209374.
- Moritz, William (1998). "Bartosch's The Idea". In Pilling, Jayne (ed.). A Reader In Animation Studies. John Libbey Publishing. pp. 93–103. ISBN 978-0-86196-900-5.
- Myrent, Glenn (1989). "Emile Reynaud: First Motion Picture Cartoonist". Film History. 3 (3). Indiana University Press: 191–202. JSTOR 3814977.
- Rossell, Deac (1995). "A Chronology of Cinema, 1889-1896". Film History. 7 (2). Indiana University Press: 115–236. JSTOR 3815166.
- Willett, Perry (2005). "The Cutting Edge of German Expressionism: The Woodcut Novel of Frans Masereel and Its Influences". In Donahue, Neil H. (ed.). A Companion to the Literature of German Expressionism. Camden House Publishing. pp. 111–134. ISBN 978-1-57113-175-1.
