= List of animated feature films of the 1960s =

A list of animated feature films released in the 1960s.

== List ==
Title	Country	Director	Production company	Animation technique	Type	Notes	Release date	Duration
1960
Alakazam the Great 西遊記 (Saiyūki)	Japan	Daisaku Shirakawa; Taiji Yabushita	Toei Animation	Traditional	Theatrical	The first animated feature release from American International Pictures, and the second anime feature film to have a theatrical release in the United States.	August 14, 1960	88 minutes
Donald Duck and his Companions	United States	Jack Cutting; Jack King; Dick Lundy	Walt Disney Productions	Traditional	Theatrical; Compilation film	Film compiled from Disney theatrical animated shorts; originally released theatrically for overseas markets and never in the United States.	March 1, 1960	80 minutes
It Was I Who Drew the Little Man; Человечка нарисовал я (Chelovechka narisoval ya)	Soviet Union	Valentina Brumberg; Zinaida Brumberg; Valentin Lalayants	Soyuzmultfilm	Traditional	Theatrical			56 minutes
1961
Chipollino; Чиполлино (Chipollino)	Soviet Union	Boris Dyozhkin	Soyuzmultfilm	Traditional	Theatrical		June 28, 1961	40 minutes
The Coyote's Lament	United States	Charles Nichols	Walt Disney Productions	Traditional/Live action	Television film Compilation film Live-action animated film	Originally aired as Season 7, Episode 18 of the anthology television series Walt Disney Presents.	March 5, 1961	60 minutes
The Hunting Instinct	United States	Wolfgang Reitherman	Walt Disney Productions	Traditional	Television film Compilation film	Originally aired as Season 8, Episode 5 of the anthology television series Walt Disney's Wonderful World of Color; later released theatrically overseas in 1962 (United Kingdom, France), 1963 (Italy, Mexico, Finland) and 1965 (Japan) with edited and expanded content.	October 22, 1961	60 minutes
The Key; Ключ (Klyuch)	Soviet Union	Lev Atamanov	Soyuzmultfilm	Traditional	Theatrical			57 minutes
The Life of Buddha 釈迦の生涯 (Shaka no Shōgai)	Japan	Noburō Ōfuji		Traditional			November 1, 1961	72 minutes
One Hundred and One Dalmatians	United States	Clyde Geronimi; Hamilton Luske; Wolfgang Reitherman	Walt Disney Productions	Traditional	Theatrical	First animated feature to use the Xerography process, which replaces hand-inking.	January 25, 1961	79 minutes
The Orphan Brother 安寿と厨子王丸 (Anju to zushio-maru)	Japan	Taiji Yabushita	Toei Animation	Traditional	Theatrical		July 19, 1961	83 minutes
The Strange History of the Citizens of Shilda; Die seltsame Historia von den Schildbürgern	East Germany	Johannes Hempel	DEFA-Studio für Trickfilme	Stop motion		First animated feature to be made in East Germany.	December 8, 1961	73 minutes
1962
Arabian Nights: The Adventures of Sinbad アラビアンナイト・シンドバッドの冒険 (Arabian naito: Shindobaddo no bôken)	Japan	Taiji Yabushita; Yoshio Kuroda	Toei Animation	Traditional	Theatrical		June 16, 1962	81 minutes
The Bath; Баня (Banya)	Soviet Union	Anatoliy Karanovich Sergei Yutkevich	Soyuzmultfilm	Stop motion	Theatrical		August 14, 1962	53 minutes
Gay Purr-ee	United States	Abe Levitow	UPA	Traditional	Theatrical	UPA's second and final feature film.	October 24, 1962	85 minutes
Heaven and Earth Magic	United States	Harry Everett Smith		Cutout	Experimental film		January 1, 1962	66 minutes
Joseph and the Dreamer בעל החלומות (Ba'al Hahalomot)	Israel	Alina Gross; Yoram Gross		Stop motion		First animated feature to be made in Israel.		60 minutes
Mister Magoo's Christmas Carol	United States	Abe Levitow	UPA	Traditional	Television special		December 18, 1962	53 minutes
Otogi's Voyage Around the World おとぎの世界旅行 (Otogi no Sekai Ryoko)	Japan	Ryuichi Yokoyama		Traditional	Theatrical		August 25, 1962	76 minutes
The Pig Boy and The Princess and the Pea; Svinedrengen og prinsessen på ærten	Denmark	Bent Christensen; Poul Ilsøe		Traditional	Theatrical; Anthology film		November 23, 1962	49 minutes
The Wild Swans; Дикие лебеди (Dikiye lebedi)	Soviet Union	Vera Tsekhanovskaya; Mikhail Tsekhanovsky	Soyuzmultfilm	Traditional	Theatrical	The first Soviet full-length animated film released in widescreen.	1962	59 minutes
1963
Comahue	Argentina	Edgardo Togni		Traditional/Live action	Documentary film		January 1, 1963	61 minutes
Doggie March わんわん忠臣蔵 (Wanwan Chūshingura)	Japan	Daisaku Shirakawa	Toei Animation	Traditional	Theatrical		December 21, 1963	82 minutes
The Little Prince and the Eight-Headed Dragon わんぱく王子の大蛇退治 (Wanpaku Ōji no Orochi Taiji)	Japan	Yūgo Serikawa	Toei Animation	Traditional	Theatrical		March 24, 1963	86 minutes
The Peacock Princess 孔雀公主 (Kong Que Gong Zhu)	China	Jun Xi	Shanghai Animation Film Studio	Stop motion				63 minutes
The Sword in the Stone	United States	Wolfgang Reitherman	Walt Disney Productions	Traditional	Theatrical		December 25, 1963	79 minutes
1964
Attention! The Magician is in the City! Внимание! В городе волшебник! (Vnimaniye! V gorode volshebnik!	Soviet Union	Vladimir Bychkov	Belarusfilm; Soyuzmultfilm	Stop motion/Live action	Theatrical; Live-action animated film		August 27, 1964	55 minutes
The Big Wick; Большой фитиль (Bolshoy fitil)	Soviet Union	Witold Bordzilovsky; Alexander Mitta; Vladimir Fetin; Vladimir Rapoport; Mary Andzhaparidze; Eduard Bocharov; Sofya Milkina; Yury Prytkov	Gorky Film Studio; Mosfilm; Lenfilm; Soyuzmultfilm	Traditional/Live action	Theatrical; Live-action animated film		April 28, 1964	68 minutes
Havoc in Heaven 大鬧天宮 (Dà nào tiān gōng)	China	Wan Laiming	Shanghai Animation Film Studio	Traditional	Theatrical			114 minutes
The Heroic Sisters from the Grassland 草原英雄小姐妹 (Caoyuan Yingxiong Xiao Jiemei)	China			Traditional	Theatrical			
Hey There, It's Yogi Bear!	United States	Joseph Barbera; William Hanna	Columbia Pictures; Hanna-Barbera Productions	Traditional	Theatrical	The first feature film by Hanna-Barbera and the first feature that is based on the animated television series.	June 3, 1964	89 minutes
The Incredible Mr. Limpet	United States	Arthur Lubin	Warner Bros.	Traditional/Live action	Theatrical; Live-action animated film		March 28, 1964	99 minutes
Is There Intelligent Life on Earth?	United Kingdom	John Halas (animation); Ralph Alswang (stage play)		Traditional/Live action	Theatrical			
Lefty; Levsha	Soviet Union	Ivan Ivanov-Vano; Vladimir Danilevich	Soyuzmultfilm	Cutout	Theatrical	First Soviet full-length animated film in equipment of cutout.	July 22, 1964	42 minutes
Mary Poppins	United States	Robert Stevenson	Walt Disney Productions	Traditional/Live action	Theatrical; Live-action animated film		August 27, 1964	139 minutes
Mighty Atom: The Brave in Space 鉄腕アトム 宇宙の勇者 (Tetsuwan Atomu: Uchū no yūsha)	Japan	Rintaro; Yoshitake Suzuki; Eiichi Yamamoto	Mushi Production	Traditional	Theatrical; Compilation film	Film compiled from episodes 46 ("The Robot Spaceship"), 56 ("Earth Defense Army") and 71 ("The Last Day of Earth") of the animated television series that ran from January 1, 1963, until December 31, 1966, for a total of 193 episodes.	July 26, 1964	87 minutes
Of Stars and Men	United States	John Hubley		Traditional	Theatrical		April 28, 1964	53 minutes
Return to Oz	United States	F.R. Crawley; Thomas Glynn; Larry Roemer	Rankin/Bass; Crawley Films	Traditional	Television special		February 9, 1964	51 minutes
Rudolph the Red-Nosed Reindeer	United States; Canada; Japan	Larry Roemer; Kizo Nagashima	Rankin/Bass; MOM Production; Dentsu	Stop motion	Television special		December 6, 1964	55 minutes
Shounen Ninja Kaze no Fujimaru: Nazo no Arabiya Ningyou 少年忍者風のフジ丸 謎のアラビヤ人形	Japan		Toei Animation	Traditional	Theatrical		July 21, 1964	55 minutes
1965
Les Aventures des Schtroumpfs; The Adventures of the Smurfs	Belgium	Eddy Ryssack; Maurice Rosy		Traditional	Theatrical; Compilation film		1965	90 minutes
Donald Duck Goes West	United States		Walt Disney Productions	Traditional	Theatrical; Compilation film	Film compiled from Disney theatrical animated shorts; originally released theatrically for overseas markets and never in the United States until July 30, 1980.	November 23, 1965	57 minutes
Gulliver's Travels Beyond the Moon ガリバーの宇宙旅行 (Garibā no Uchū Ryokō)	Japan	Masao Kuroda; Sanae Yamamoto	Toei Animation	Traditional			March 20, 1965	80 minutes
The Man from Button Willow	United States	David Detiege	Eagle Films	Traditional/Live action	Theatrical		April 3, 1965	81 minutes
Pinocchio in Outer Space	Belgium; United States	Ray Goossens	Belvision Studios	Traditional	Theatrical		December 22, 1965	71 minutes
Shounen Ninja Kaze no Fujimaru: Ma Boroshi Majutsu-dan 少年忍者風のフジ丸 まぼろし魔術団	Japan		Toei Animation	Traditional			March 20, 1965	
Shounen Ninja Kaze no Fujimaru: Dai Saru Taiji 少年忍者風のフジ丸 大猿退治	Japan		United Feature Syndicate; Mendelson/Melendez Productions; Cinema Center Films; National General Pictures	Traditional			January 1, 1965	
Treasure Island Revisited 新宝島 (New Treasure Island)	Japan	Osamu Tezuka	Mushi Production	Traditional	Television special	First anime television special; originally produced as an installment of the aborted animated anthology series Mushi Pro Land.	January 3, 1965	52 minutes
West and Soda	Italy	Bruno Bozzetto		Traditional	Theatrical		October 1, 1965	86 minutes
Willy McBean and His Magic Machine	United States; Canada; Japan	Arthur Rankin, Jr. Kizo Nagashima	Videocraft International; MOM Production; Dentsu Motion Pictures	Stop motion	Theatrical		June 23, 1965	94 minutes
1966
Alice in Wonderland or What's a Nice Kid Like You Doing in a Place Like This?	United States	Alex Lovy	Screen Gems; Hanna-Barbera Productions	Traditional	Television special		March 30, 1966	49 minutes
Alice of Wonderland in Paris	United States; Czechoslovakia	Gene Deitch	Rembrandt Films	Traditional	Theatrical; Anthology film		February 5, 1966	52 minutes
The Ballad of Smokey the Bear	United States; Japan	Larry Roemer; Kizo Nagashima	Rankin/Bass; MOM Production	Stop motion	Television special		November 24, 1966	60 minutes
Cyborg 009 サイボーグゼロゼロナイン (Saibōgu Zero-Zero-Nain)	Japan	Yugo Serikawa	Toei Animation	Traditional	Theatrical		July 21, 1966	65 minutes
The Daydreamer	United States; Japan	Jules Bass; Kizo Nagashima	Videocraft International; MOM Production	Stop motion/Live action	Theatrical; Live-action animated film		June 22, 1966	101 minutes
The Dream Wizard; El mago de los sueños	Spain	Francisco Macián	Estudios Macián	Traditional	Theatrical	Featuring the Family Telerín,	December 16, 1966	70 minutes
Filippo the Cat: License to Record; Gatto Filippo: licenza di incidere	Italy	Daniele D'Anza; Pino Zac	Mushi Production	Traditional	Theatrical		December 23, 1966	76 minutes
Go There, Don't Know Where; Поди туда, не знаю куда (Podi tuda, nye znayu kuda)	Soviet Union	Ivan Ivanov-Vano; Vladimir Danilevich	Soyuzmultfilm	Cutout/Stop motion	Theatrical	First full-length animated film combining the stop-motion and cutout animation.	January 1, 1966	52 minutes
Jungle Emperor Leo 長編 ジャングル大帝 (Chōhen Jungle Taitei)	Japan	Eiichi Yamamoto	Mushi Production	Traditional	Theatrical	Alternate retelling of the plot of the animated television series Kimba the White Lion, compiling the first two minutes of the first episode ("Go, Child of Panja") with the remaining 73 minutes of original material.	July 31, 1966	75 minutes
King of the World: The King Kong Show 世界の王者 キングコング大会 (Sekai no Ōja: Kingu Kongu Taikai)	Japan		Toei Animation	Traditional	Television special	Pilot of the animated television series The King Kong Show (1966–1969) dubbed into Japanese.	December 31, 1966	56 minutes
The Man Called Flintstone	United States	Joseph Barbera; William Hanna	Columbia Pictures; Hanna-Barbera Productions	Traditional	Theatrical	The second feature by Hanna-Barbera.	August 3, 1966	89 minutes
1967
Asterix the Gaul; Astérix le Gaulois	France; Belgium	Ray Goossens	Belvision Studios; Dargaud Films; Les Productions René Goscinny; Athos Films; Ciné Vog Films	Traditional	Theatrical	First installment in the Asterix film series; Plot adapted from volume 1 of the comic book series.	December 20, 1967	68 minutes
Band of Ninja 忍者武芸帳 (Ninja bugei-chō)	Japan	Nagisa Oshima	Oshima Productions; Sozosha; Art Theatre Guild	Motion comic			February 15, 1967	123 minutes
Cricket on the Hearth	United States; Japan	Arthur Rankin, Jr. Jules Bass	Videocraft International; Television Corporation of Japan	Traditional	Television special		December 18, 1967	49 minutes
Cyborg 009: Monster Wars サイボーグゼロゼロナイン 怪獣戦争 (Saibōgu Zero-Zero-Nain: Kaijū Sensō)	Japan	Yugo Serikawa	Toei Animation	Traditional	Theatrical		March 19, 1967	60 minutes
The Halas & Batchelor Ruddigore	United Kingdom	Joy Batchelor	Halas and Batchelor	Traditional	Theatrical			54 minutes
Heungbu and Nolbu 흥부와 놀부 (Heungbuwa Nolbu)	South Korea	Kang Tae-woong	Eunyoung Film Co., Ltd.	Stop motion	Theatrical		July 30, 1967	67 minutes
Hopi and Chadol Bawi 호피와 차돌바위 (Hopiwa Chadolbawi)	South Korea	Shin Dong-Heon	Daeyeong Donghwa Film Studio; Joint Film Co., Ltd. Kukdong Film Co., Ltd.	Traditional	Theatrical		August 15, 1967	70 minutes
Jack and the Beanstalk	United States	Gene Kelly	Hanna-Barbera Productions	Traditional/Live action	Television special Live-action animated film		February 26, 1967	51 minutes
Jack and the Witch 少年ジャックと魔法使い (Shōnen Jakku to Mahōtsukai)	Japan	Taiji Yabushita	Toei Animation	Traditional	Theatrical	The tenth Toei Animation feature film overall.	March 19, 1967	80 minutes
The Jungle Book	United States	Wolfgang Reitherman	Walt Disney Productions	Traditional	Theatrical	The film was the last Disney animated feature film to be produced by Walt Disney due to his death in 1966.	October 18, 1967	78 minutes
The Madcap Island ひょっこりひょうたん島 (Hyokkori Hyōtanjima)	Japan	Taiji Yabushita	Toei Animation	Traditional	Theatrical		July 21, 1967	
Mad Monster Party?	United States; Japan	Jules Bass; Kizo Nagashima	Videocraft International; MOM Production	Stop motion	Theatrical		March 8, 1967	95 minutes
Mr. and Mrs. Kabal's Theatre; Le Théâtre de monsieur et madame Kabal	France	Walerian Borowczyk		Cutout/Traditional/Live action	Theatrical		December 6, 1967	80 minutes
The Stolen Airship; Ukradená vzducholoď	Czechoslovakia	Karel Zeman		Stop motion / Cutout / Live action	Theatrical		April 28, 1967	88 minutes
A Story of Hong Gil-dong 홍길동 (Hong Gil-dongjeon)	South Korea	Shin Dong-Heon	Segi Trading Co., Ltd.	Traditional	Theatrical	First Korean animated feature.	January 21, 1967	70 minutes
The Wacky World of Mother Goose	United States; Japan	Jules Bass; Kizo Nagashima	Videocraft International; Toei Animation	Traditional	Theatrical	The first animated theatrical feature from Rankin/Bass.	September 27, 1967	81 minutes
1968
Adam 2	West Germany	Jan Lenica	Film Boris von Borrisholm; Lux-Film	Cutout	Theatrical			79 minutes
Asterix and Cleopatra; Astérix et Cléopâtre	Belgium; France	René Goscinny; Lee Payant; Albert Uderzo	Belvision Studios; Dargaud Films; Les Productions René Goscinny	Traditional	Theatrical	Second installment in the Asterix film series; Plot adapted from volume 6 of the comic book series.	December 19, 1968	72 minutes
The Golden Iron Man 황금철인 (Hwanggeum Cheol-in)	South Korea	Park Young-il	Segi Trading Co., Ltd.	Traditional	Theatrical		July 25, 1968	90 minutes
The Great Adventure of Horus, Prince of the Sun 太陽の王子 ホルスの大冒険 (Taiyō no Ōji Horusu no Daibōken)	Japan	Isao Takahata	Toei Animation	Traditional	Theatrical	First anime feature directed by Isao Takahata.	July 21, 1968	82 minutes
The Magic Bird; Putiferio va alla guerra (Putiferio Goes to War)	Italy	Roberto Gavioli	Gamma Film; Rizzoli Film; Saba Cinematografica; Cineriz	Traditional	Theatrical		December 23, 1968	88 minutes
The Mickey Mouse Anniversary Show	United States	William Beaudine; Ward Kimball	Walt Disney Productions	Traditional/Live action	Television film Compilation film Live-action animated film	Film compiled from Disney theatrical animated shorts; originally first aired as the 11th episode of Walt Disney's Wonderful World of Color on its fifteenth season, and later released theatrically for overseas markets.	December 22, 1968	84 minutes
The Mouse on the Mayflower	United States; Japan	Arthur Rankin, Jr. Jules Bass	Rankin/Bass; Toei Animation	Traditional	Television special		November 23, 1968	45 minutes
Out of an Old Man's Head; I huvet på en gammal gubbe	Sweden	Per Åhlin (animation); Tage Danielsson (live action)		Traditional/Live action	Theatrical	First Swedish animated feature.	December 6, 1968	77 minutes
Sun Wukong 손오공 (Son Ogong)	South Korea	Park Young-il	Segi Trading Co., Ltd.	Traditional	Theatrical		January 1, 1968	67 minutes
The SuperVips; Vip - Mio fratello superuomo	Italy	Bruno Bozzetto		Traditional	Theatrical		October 31, 1968	82 minutes
Tobimaru and the Nine-tailed Fox 九尾の狐と飛丸 (Kyubi no kitsune to Tobimaru)	Japan	Shinichi Yagi	Belvision Studios; Dargaud Films; Les Productions René Goscinny	Traditional	Theatrical		October 19, 1968	
The World of Hans Christian Andersen アンデルセン物語 (Andersen Monogatari)	Japan	Kimio Yabuki	Toei Animation	Traditional	Theatrical		March 19, 1968	80 minutes
Yellow Submarine	United Kingdom; United States	George Dunning; Dennis Abey (live action)	Apple Films; King Features Syndicate	Traditional/Live action	Theatrical		July 17, 1968	90 minutes
1969
The Animals' Conference; Die Konferenz der Tiere	West Germany	Curt Linda	Linda Film; Gloria Film Distribution (distributor)	Traditional	Theatrical		December 18, 1969	93 minutes
A Boy Named Charlie Brown	United States	Lee Mendelson; Bill Melendez; Charles M. Schulz	United Feature Syndicate; Mendelson/Melendez Productions; Cinema Center Films; National General Pictures	Traditional	Theatrical	First feature film in the Peanuts franchise, and the first to be distributed by National General Pictures.	December 4, 1969	85 minutes
A Christmas Carol	Australia; United States	Zoran Janjic	Air Programs International	Traditional	Television special	First Australian animated feature and the first American collaboration with another nation for an animated feature; later originally aired on December 13, 1970 as the third installment of the CBS anthology television series Famous Classic Tales (1970-1984).	November 20, 1969	45 minutes
Flying Phantom Ship 空飛ぶゆうれい船 (Soratobu Yūreisen)	Japan	Hiroshi Ikeda	Toei Animation	Traditional	Theatrical	First anime feature film dubbed into Russian and released to theaters in the Soviet Union.	July 20, 1969	60 minutes
General Hong Gil-dong 홍길동 장군 (Honggildong Janggun)	South Korea	Yongyusu	Segi Trading Co., Ltd.	Traditional	Theatrical		July 21, 1969	72 minutes
Mort & Phil's First Festival; Festival de Mortadelo y Filemón	Spain	Rafael Vara	Estudios Vara; Antonio Salado Crespo (distributor)	Traditional	Theatrical	First compilation film of the Spanish animated short film series Mortadelo y Filemón (1966-1971), that ran for 23 6-minute installments and was based on the comic strip of the same title by Francisco Ibáñez.		74 minutes
Mystery-Bouffe; Мистерия-Буфф (Misteriya-Buff)	Soviet Union	David Cherkasskiy	Kievnauchfilm	Live action/Cutout/Traditional	Theatrical; Live-action animated film	First feature film combining at once three forms of pictorialism at cinema: cutout and traditional animation, and also live action.		60 minutes
The Nonexistent Knight; Il Cavaliere inesistente	Italy	Pino Zac		Traditional/Live-action; Cutout/Stop motion	Theatrical		December 30, 1969	97 minutes
A Thousand and One Nights 千夜一夜物語 (Senya Ichiya Monogatari)	Japan	Eiichi Yamamoto; Osamu Tezuka	Mushi Production	Traditional	Theatrical	First film in the anthology film series Animerama.	June 14, 1969	128 minutes
Maruhi Gekiga, Ukiyoe Senichiya (秘)劇画 浮世絵千一夜	Japan	Leo Nishimura	Leo Production	Traditional	Theatrical	First animated film to receive the R-18 in Japan.	October 29, 1969	70 minutes
Star of the Giants: The Bloody Finals 巨人の星 血ぞめの決勝戦 (Kyojin no Hoshi: Chizome no Kesshōusen)	Japan		TMS Entertainment	Traditional	Theatrical	Film compiled from episodes 1 ("Mezase Eikou no Hoshi") and 33 ("Koushien no V Sign") of the anime television series, which aired from March 30, 1968, until September 18, 1971, for a total of 182 episodes.	July 26, 1969	90 minutes
Star of the Giants: Go Go Hyūma 巨人の星 行け行け飛雄馬 (Kyojin no Hoshi: Ike Ike Hyūma)	Japan		TMS Entertainment	Traditional	Theatrical	Film compiled from episodes 38 ("Namida no Sutoraiku") and 52 ("Eikou no Sebangou 16") of the anime television series, which aired from March 30, 1968, until September 18, 1971, for a total of 182 episodes.	December 20, 1969	70 minutes
Till a City Beneath the Sea is Built 海底都市の出来るまで (Kaitei Toshi no Dekiru Made)	Japan	Eiichi Yamamoto	Mushi Production	Traditional	Television special		February 2, 1969	
Tintin and the Temple of the Sun; Tintin et le Temple du Soleil	France; Belgium; Switzerland	Eddie Lateste	Belvision Studios	Traditional	Theatrical	First Swiss animated feature.	December 13, 1969	77 minutes
Treasure Island 보물섬 (Bomulseom)	South Korea	Park Young-il	Segi Trading Co., Ltd.	Traditional	Theatrical		January 1, 1969	
The Wonderful World of Puss 'n Boots 長靴をはいた猫 (Nagagutsu o Haita Neko)	Japan	Kimio Yabuki	Toei Animation	Traditional	Theatrical	The title character eventually became the official mascot and logo for the Toei Animation studio.	March 18, 1969	82 minutes

== Highest-grossing animated films of the decade ==
Rank	Title	Studio	Release Year	Gross	Ref
1	One Hundred and One Dalmatians	Walt Disney Productions	1961	$144,900,000	
2	Mary Poppins	Walt Disney Productions	1964	$103,000,000	
3	The Incredible Mr. Limpet	Warner Bros.	1964	$38,000,000	
4	The Jungle Book	Walt Disney Productions	1967	$23,800,000	
5	Les Aventures des Schtroumpfs		1965	$19,000,000	
6	A Boy Named Charlie Brown	United Feature Syndicate; Mendelson/Melendez Productions; Cinema Center Films; National General Pictures	1969	$12,000,000	
7	Asterix and Cleopatra	Belvision Studios; Dargaud Films; Les Productions René Goscinny	1968	$7,000,000	
8	The Sword in the Stone	Walt Disney Productions	1963	$4,750,000	
9	The Orphan Brother	Toei Animation	1961	¥1,500,000,000 [$4,166,667]	
9	The Wonderful World of Puss 'n Boots	Toei Animation	1969	¥1,500,000,000 [$4,166,667]	
10	The Animals' Conference	Linda Film	1969	$4,070,000	
