= Raphael Patkanian bibliography =

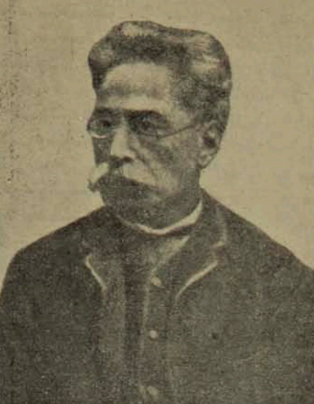
Raphael Patkanian

Raphael Patkanian (1830–1892) was a nineteenth-century Russian Armenian writer and educator. He gained popularity for his poetry, much of which is written on patriotic themes. His complete works were published in eight volumes in Yerevan from 1963 to 1974.

This is a list of Patkanian's published works, including works and collections published posthumously. Individual poems, stories, and articles are only included where published as separate editions.

== Works ==
=== Collections of poetry ===
- (1864) Gamaṛ-Kʻatʻipayi banasteghtsutʻiwnkʻě Գամառ-Քաթիպայի բանաստեղծութիւնքը [Gamar-Katipa's poems]. Moscow: Tparan Lazareantsʻ chemarani. Published under the pseudonym Gamar-Katipa. (Read online.)
- (1878) Azat erger Ազատ երգեր [Free songs]. Tiflis: Tparan Hambardzumay Ēnfiacheantsʻ ew ěnk. "Pʻordz" azgayin handisi hrat. Published under the pseudonym Gamar-Katipa. (Read online.)
- (1879) Nor Nakhijewani kʻnar Նոր Նախիջեւանի քնար [Lyre of Nakhichevan-on-Don]. Rostov-on-Don: Tparan Yovhannu Tēr-Abrahamean. Published under the pseudonym Siwliwk. (Read online.)
- (1880) Mankakan erger Մանկական երգեր [Children's songs]. Tiflis: Tparan Y. Martiroseantsʻi. Published under the pseudonym Gamar-Katipa. (Read online.)
- (1941) Mankakan banasteghtsutʻyunner Մանկական բանաստեղծություններ [Children's poems]. Erevan: Haypethrat. (Read online.)
- (1941) Banasteghtsutʻyunner Բանաստեղծություններ [Poems]. Erevan: Haypethrat. (Read online.)
- (1941) "Garun" and "Tsitsernak," individual poems published in separate booklets.
- (1944) Mankakan erger Մանկական երգեր [Children's songs]. Erevan: Haypethrat.
- (1955) Kṛunkner Կռունկներ [Cranes]. Erevan: Haypethrat.
- (1981) Astghikner Աստղիկներ [Starlets]. Erevan: Sovetakan grogh. (Children's poems.)
- (1987) "Badik," individual poem published in a separate booklet.
- (2005) Banasteghtsutʻyunneri ěntrani Բանաստեղծությունների ընտրանի [Selected poems]. Erevan: Lusabats.

=== Stories and novellas ===
- (1875) Govor Nakhichevanskiĭ / Ṛ. Akhtamerkeani patmatsnerě Nor-Nakhijewani ochov Говоръ Нахичеванскiй / Ռ. Ախտամերկեանի պատմածները Նոր-Նախիջեանի ոճով [Speech of Nakhichevan / R. Akhtamerkian's stories in the Nakhichevan-on-Don dialect]. Materialy dlia izucheniia armianskikh narechiĭ, vol. 1 (in Russian and Armenian). Published by K. Patkanov. Saint Petersburg: Tipografiia Imperatorskoĭ Akademii nauk. Published under the pseudonym R. Akhtamerkean. (Collection of stories. Read online.)
- (1878) Girgor Kaiapʻa: Hinutʻ patmutʻin Գիրգոր Կաիափա․ Հինութ պատմութին [Girgor Caiapha: an old story]. Rostov-on-Don: Tparan Yovhannu Tēr-Abrahamean. Published under the pseudonym Khěchi-Agha (Story. Read online.)
- (1884) Tikin ew nazhisht Տիկին եւ նաժիշտ [Lady and servant girl]. Tiflis: Tparan Y. Martiroseantsʻi. (Novella. Read online.)
- (1905) Shaterēn mekě Շատերէն մեկը [One out of many]. Nakhichevan-on-Don: Tparan Serovbē Awageantsʻi. (Story. Read online.)
- (1909) Chʻakhu Չախու [Knife]. Tiflis: Hasker amsagri hrat. (Story, orig. date 1875; translated from the Nakhichevan dialect by Stepan Lisitsian. Read online). Republished in Erevan in 1946, 1951, and 1983.
- (1958) Pʻaṛaser Փառասեր [Vainglorious]. Erevan: Haypetusmankhrat. (Story.)
- (2010) Es nshanats ēi: chshgrit antsʻkʻ im hishatakaranitsʻ Ես նշանած էի․ ճշգրիտ անցք իմ հիշատակարանից [I was engaged: true events from my memories]. Los Angeles: IndoEuropean.

=== Plays ===
- (1879) Pampulios: Kʻōmetia irekʻ gortsoghutʻinov Պամպուլիոս: Քօմետիա իրեք գործողութինով [Pampulios: a comedy in three acts]. Rostov-on-Don: Tparan Yovhannu Tēr-Abrahamean. Published under the pseudonym Siwliwk. (Read online.)

=== Other collections ===
- (1855–1857) Gamaṛ-Kʻatʻipayi ardzak ew chʻapaberakan ashkhatutʻiwnnerě Գամառ-Քաթիպայի բանաստեղծութիւնքը [Gamar-Katipa's prose and versified works]. Saint Petersburg. 5 pamphlets (1, 2, 3, 4, 5). Co-authored with Gevorg Kananian and Mnatsakan Timurian.
- (1893) Ṛ. Patkaneani ěntir erkasirutʻiwnnerě Ռ․ Պատկանեանի ընտիր երկասիրութիւնները [Selected works of R. Patkanian]. Selected works, 2 vols. (Vol. 1, vol. 2.)
- (1904) Erkasirutʻiwnner Երկասիրութիւններ [Works]. Rostov-on-Don: Donskaya Rech. (Continuation of the 1893 collection. Read online.)
- (1946) Erkeri zhoghovatsu։ Ardzak Երկերի ժողովածու․ Արձակ [Collected works: prose]. Erevan: Haypethrat. (Collection of prose works.)
- (1950) Ěntir erker Ընտիր երկեր [Select works]. Erevan: Haypethrat. (Selected works.)
- (1955) Erker։ Chapʻatso ev ardzak Երկեր․ Չափածո և արձակ [Works: verse and prose]. Erevan: Haypethrat. (Selected works.)
- (1963–1974) Erkeri zhoghovatsu Երկերի ժողովածու. Erevan: Haykakan SSṚ GA hratarakchʻutʻyun. (Collected works, 8 vols. Vol. 1, vol. 2)
- (1972) Pʻaṛaser Փառասեր [Vainglorious]. Erevan: Haypetusmankhrat. (Collection of stories, including "Pʻaṛaser," "Es nshanats ēi" [I was engaged], "Chʻakhu," and the novella Tikin ev nazhisht.)
- (1973) Nor-Nakhijevanyan patmvatskʻner Նոր-Նախիջևանյան պատմվածքներ [Nakhichevan-on-Don stories]. Erevan: Hayastan. (Selected works.)
- (1980) Erker Երկեր [Works]. Edited by S. Topchian. Erevan: Sovetakan grogh. (Selected works. Read online)
- (1984) Erker Երկեր [Works]. Edited by O. Papoyan. Erevan: Luys. (Selected works.)
- (2012) Steghtsagortsutʻyunneri zhoghovatsu Ստեղծագործությունների ժողովածու [Collection of works]. Erevan: Edit Print.

=== Non-fiction ===
- (1856) Nor aybbenaran haykakan Նոր այբբենարան հայկական [New Armenian abecedary]. Saint Petersburg: Tparan Eōnsōni. (Textbook. Read online.)
- (1863) Patmutʻiwn Metsi Petrosi Kayser amenayn Ṛusatsʻ Պատմութիւն Մեծին Պետրոսի Կայսեր ամենայն Ռուսաց [History of Peter the Great, emperor of all the Russias]. Saint Petersburg. (Read online.)
- (1870) Zhoghovatsoykʻ otarazgi baṛeri Nor Nakhijewantsʻotsʻ lezui mēj mtats Ժողովածոյք օտարազգի բառերի Նոր Նախիջեւանցոց լեզուի մէջ մտած [Collections of foreign words that have entered the Nakhichevan-on-Don dialect]. Saint Petersburg: Tparan Ō. V. Landsbergi. (Dictionary. Read online.)
- (1875) Srbuhi Eghiayean Khlětcheani kensagrutʻiwně Սրբուհի Եղիայեան Խլըտճեանի կենսագրութիւնը [Srbuhi Yeghiayan Khletchian's biography]. Tparan Yovhannu Tēr-Abrahamean. (Biography. Read online.)
- (1879) Nor-Nakhijewani himnarkutʻean patmutʻiwně Նոր-Նախիջեւանի հիմնարկութեան պատմութիւնը [History of the establishment of Nakhichevan-on-Don]. Tiflis: Tparan H. Ēnfiacheantsʻi ew ěnk. Published under the pseudonym Siwliwk. (Read online.)
- (1881) Mayreni barbaṛ Մայրենի բարբառ [Mother language]. Rostov-on-Don: Tpagratun A. V. Kholevayi. (Textbook. Read online.)
- (1884) Aybbenaran hnchʻakan ochov Այբբենարան հնչական ոճով [Abecedary in sounding style]. Vienna. (Textbook. Read online.)
- (1885) Tarrakan gitutʻiwnkʻ Տարրական գիտութիւնք [Elementary knowledge]. Tiflis: Tparan Y. Martiroseantsʻi. (Textbook. Read online.)
- (1889) Vardapetaran Hayastani azatutʻean Վարդապետարան Հայաստանի ազատութեան [The teaching of Armenia's freedom]. M. Portugalian. (Article.) 2nd ed. 1891. Republished in Erevan, 1989.

=== Translations by Patkanian ===
- (1857) Ṛōbinzōn Kṛiwzōi patmutʻiwně Ռօբինզօն Կռիւզօի պատմութիւնը. Saint Petersburg: Tparan Yakob Eōnsōni. (From Daniel Defoe's Robinson Crusoe. Read online.)
- (1857) Hatěntir ew patkerazard aṛakkʻ Ezoposi ew aṛatskʻ pēspēs azgatsʻ Հատընտիր եւ պատկերազարդ առակք Եզոպոսի եւ առածք պէսպէս ազգաց [Selected and illustrated fables of Aesop and sayings of various nations]. Tiflis: Gratun Aladatʻeani.
- (1882) Ukhtaworkʻ Ուխտաւորք [Pilgrims]. Tparan Movs. Vardaneantsʻ. (Translations of tales by Wilhelm Hauff. Read online.)
- (1884) Oski dznik Ոսկի ձկնիկ [Golden fish]. Tiflis: Tparan Movsisi Vardanean. (From Alexander Pushkin's "The Tale of the Fisherman and the Fish." Read online.)

=== Translations into English ===
- (1901) Arnot, Robert. Armenian Literature. New York: Colonial Press. pp. 48, 49–54. (Anthology. Read online.)
- (1913) Boyajian, Z. "Leretz amberi". Armenia. 10: 294.
- (1916) Blackwell, A. "Let the Wind Blow". The New Armenia (11): 173.
- (1917) Blackwell, A. S. Armenian Poems. Boston: Robert Chambers. pp. 66–94, 250. (Anthology. Read online.)
- (1929) Arnot, Robert. "Sweet Lady, Whence the Sadness in your Face?". The New Armenia (1): 11–12.
- (1961) "The Tears of Araxes". Shoghagat. 67. (Read online.)

== Sources ==
- Bardakjian, Kevork B. (2000). A Reference Guide to Modern Armenian Literature 1500-1920. Detroit: Wayne State University Press. pp. 460–462. ISBN 0-8143-2747-8.
- Patkanian, Raphael (1963–1974). Erkeri zhoghovatsu Երկերի ժողովածու (in Armenian). Erevan: Haykakan SSṚ GA hratarakchʻutʻyun.
