= Ciechanowski =

Ciechanowski (Polish pronunciation: [tɕɛxaˈnɔfski]; feminine: Ciechanowska; plural: Ciechanowscy) is a Polish-language surname associated with locations named Ciechanów in Poland, most probably the town of Ciechanów. The surname is Russified as Tsekhanovsky.

The surname may refer to:

- Damian Ciechanowski (born 1996), Polish professional footballer
- Jan Stanisław Ciechanowski, Polish official, chairman of the Office for War Veterans and Victims of Oppression
- Jan Ciechanowski (1887–1973), Polish diplomat, ambassador to the United States between 1940 and 1945
- Waldemar Ciechanowski, a former singer from Polish rock band Quidam
- Mikhail Tsekhanovsky (1889–1965), Soviet animated film director
