= The Flower with Seven Colors =

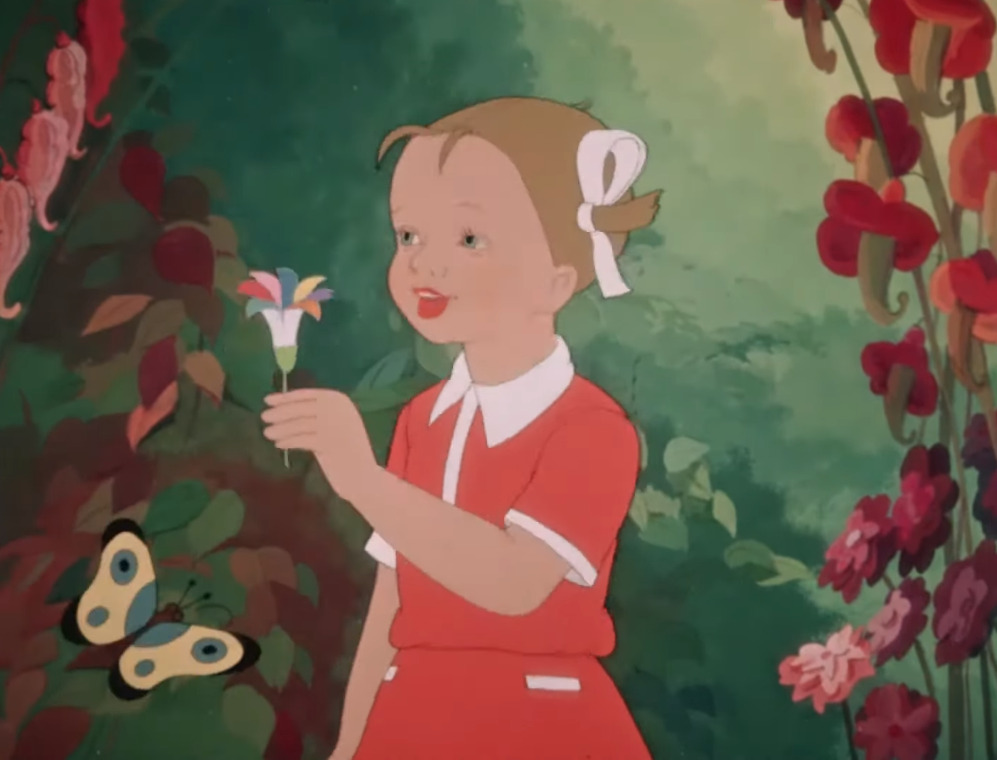
- Russian: Цветик-семицветик
- Directed by: Mikhail Tsekhanovsky, Vera Tsekhanovskaya
- Written by: Valentin Kataev, Mikhail Volpin
- Release date: 1948
- Running time: 20 minutes
- Country: Soviet Union
- Language: Russian

The Flower with Seven Colors (Russian: Цветик-семицветик; tr.:Tsvetik-semitsvetik) is a Soviet animated film released in 1948 based on the fairy tale of the same name. It was directed by Mikhail Tsekhanovsky and Vera Tsekhanovskaya and produced at the Soyuzmultfilm animation studio.
