= The Magic Bird =

- Directed by: Roberto Gavioli
- Screenplay by: Bruno Paolinelli
- Based on: La guerriera nera by Mario Chiereghin
- Produced by: Bruno Paolinelli
- Edited by: Vittorio Sedini
- Music by: Beppe Moraschi
- Production companies: Gamma Film; Rizzoli Film; Saba Cinematografica
- Distributed by: Cineriz (Italy); Cinemation Industries (U.S.)
- Release dates: 23 December 1968 (Italy); 1972 (US)
- Running time: 88 minutes
- Country: Italy
- Language: Italian

The Magic Bird (Italian: Putiferio va alla guerra) is a 1968 Italian animated film. It is also known as Perils of Problemina.

== See also ==
- List of animated feature films: 1960s
