= Post (film) =

1929 film

- Russian: Почта
- Directed by: Mikhail Tsekhanovsky; N. Timofeev
- Written by: Samuil Marshak
- Based on: The poem Post by Samuil Marshak
- Cinematography: Mikhail Tsekhanovsky
- Music by: Vladimir Deshevov
- Animation by: Ivan Druzhinin
- Production company: Leningrad Films
- Release date: 1929
- Running time: 15 minutes
- Country: Soviet Union
- Language: Russian

Post (Russian: Почта) is a 1929 Soviet animated short film directed by Mikhail Tsekhanovsky and N. Timofeev.

== Plot ==
The plot is based on an eponymous poem by Samuil Marshak. Marshak writes a letter to Boris Zhitkov who is travelling. The letter follows Zhitkov in various countries he travels through, but is always late, and Zhitkov only receives it when he is back in Leningrad.
