= Eladio González Garza =

Mexican voice actor (1936–2026)

Eladio González Garza (April 24, 1936 – February 5, 2026) was a Mexican voice actor.

== Life and career ==
Garza was born in Monterrey on April 24, 1936. In 2017, the ANDA awarded him a gold medal for 50 years of uninterrupted artistic career. Notable voice roles include him being the Spanish dubbing actor for Bo Duke in The Dukes of Hazzard (1979), the first voices of Philosopher Smurf and Brainy Smurf in The Smurfs, amongst others.

Garza died on February 5, 2026, at the age of 89.
