= Mikhail Tsekhanovsky =

Russian painter

- Born: Mikhail Mikhailovich Tsekhanovsky; 7 June 1889; Proskurov, Podolia Governorate, Russian Empire
- Died: 22 June 1965 (aged 76); Moscow, USSR
- Occupations: Animator, artist, book illustrator

Mikhail Mikhailovich Tsekhanovsky (Russian: Михаил Михайлович Цехановский; 7 June [O.S. 26 May] 1889 — 22 June 1965) was a Russian and Soviet artist, animation director, book illustrator, screenwriter, sculptor and educator. He was one of the founders and unchallenged leaders of the Leningrad school of Soviet animation. Meritorious Artist of the RSFSR (1964).

== Early years ==
Mikhail Tsekhanovsky was born in Proskurov (modern-day Khmelnytskyi, Ukraine) into a Russian noble family. His father Mikhail Yurievich Tsekhanovsky (Polish: Ciechanowski) (1859—1928/29) was an Active State Councillor and a sugar manufacturer, an official representative of the All-Russian Society of Sugar Manufacturers who emigrated to Paris following the October Revolution. His mother Zinaida Grigorievna Tsekhanovskaya died in 1899 aged 32.

Tsekhanovsky was raised in Saint Petersburg and studied in the First Saint Petersburg Gymnasium, the most prestigious school of its time where only children of noblemen were accepted. He started painting while still in gymnasium, and upon graduation left for Paris where he was trained as a sculptor in private workshops between 1908 and 1910. On his return Tsekhanovsky entered the Imperial Academy of Arts and the Saint Petersburg Imperial University Faculty of Law, but left both of them with the start of the World War I and moved to Moscow. He then entered the Moscow School of Painting, Sculpture and Architecture which he finished in 1918.

Same year he was enrolled to the 16th Army by the Soviet authorities where his talents were used for agitprop. Tsekhanovsky drew posters, designed agitational trains, painted cinemas and clubs, carved sculptures and made scenery for the front theatre. From 1920 to 1922 he also headed the art studio at the Smolensk Red Army University. Among his students was Mikhail Volpin who later wrote screenplays for many of his animated projects.

== Leningrad period ==
=== From book to film ===
A clip from Post (silent version)

In 1923 Tsekhanovsky demobilized and returned to Saint Petersburg (then Petrograd, renamed to Leningrad in a year) where he continued the art career. Among his projects were cinema posters that advertised foreign movies. He also taught art at the Tavricheskaya Art School. In 1926 he joined a group of book illustrators headed by Vladimir Lebedev which specialized on children's literature. Tsekhanovsky's area was popular science. His distinguishable "industrial" art style influenced by Lebedev and the constructivism aesthetic brought him fame.

In 1927 he illustrated the Post poem by Samuil Marshak about a letter that followed his friend Boris Zhitkov in his adventures around the world. The book saw many re-releases and has been since considered the peak of Tsekhanovsky's craftsmanship. Biographers agreed on that the book itself was designed according to the rules of film editing and was "full of movement". The artist also produced a number of flip books, thus his turn to animation was only a matter of time.

In 1928 Sovkino signed a contract with him for an animated film based on Post. Tsekhanovsky, unfamiliar with the media, collaborated with Ivan Druzhinin and his own wife Vera Tsekhanovskaya, both professionally trained beginning animators. They had to improvise on their way and ended with a mix of traditional and cutout animation (called flat marionettes at the time) that brought Tsekhanovsky's unique vision to life. The silent version of Post was released in 1929, and in 1930 a musical score by Mikhail Deshevov was added along with a voiceover and some text by Daniil Kharms, while the positive was colorized by hand. It became the first Soviet animated color and sound film, while also the first to gain domestic and international acclaim. Frank Lloyd Wright showed it to Walt Disney as an example of thought-provoking animation.

=== Picture and sound ===
Pacific 231: Symphonic Poem About a Steam Locomotive

For the first time Soviet press started talking about animation as a new form of art, which was in fact director's original intention. As he wrote in his critical essay From Murzilka to Big Art, filmmakers of that time took animation for a "secondary, creatively insignificant offshoot of the big art of cinema, but not as a branch of graphics and painting, not to mention a separate form of art... Technical, professional and artistic processes of building a graphiс film are entirely different from the filmmaking process... Animation is not a filmed marionette, not a puppetry, not a theatre, not cinema... It is a new spatiotemporal type of fine art".

In the same essay Tsekhanovsky brought up the subject of unity of animation and sound, as well as the concept of graphical sound which he is credited with inventing way back in 1929. While Arseny Avraamov and others started developing the idea actively, Tsekhanovsky went his own way. The 1930 version of Post already featured a rhythmical picture synchronized with the pre-recorded sound, making it a separate, independent element of the film. In 1931 he directed two experimental "naturophotographic" live shorts Gopak and Pacific 231 made as attempts to illustrate a national dance and Arthur Honegger's orchestral work by synchronizing visual imagery with music.

=== The Tale of Balda ===
All this inspired Mikhail and Vera Tsekhanovsky to launch their most ambitious project: an animated opera The Tale of the Priest and of His Workman Balda based on the fairy tale in verse by Alexander Pushkin with a heavy Rosta posters influence. It was conceived in 1932 as the first traditionally animated Soviet feature film that used the "album method" of animation, with characters drawn on paper instead of celluloid. In 1933 Tsekhanovsky invited Dmitri Shostakovich to create the score and Alexander Vvedensky to write lyrics.

The Bazaar scene from The Tale of the Priest and of His Workman Balda

Shostakovich loved the opportunity to compose an innovative satirical opera with abstract characters led by his music and not by someone else. He called it "a fairy tale full of ardor, ease and joy, and writing music for it is just as easy and joyful". As Tsekhanovsky wrote during September 1934, "...he works incredibly fast without losing quality. True artist. True craftsman. Now it's up to me. I must create something worth of his music. I must. Balda is the only project where I can show what I'm capable of". They recorded 15 scenes by November.

Yet problems started early into the production. Tsekhanovsky, still inexperienced, was always behind the composer, facing organizational and financial problems. First attempts to close Balda by Lenfilm date back to 1933. In March 1936, studio executives persuaded the composer to reorchestrate his score from a symphony to chamber orchestra. Around the same time the infamous Muddle Instead of Music article was published in press, condemning Shostakovich's opera. All this paralyzed the work, and the project was officially closed.

Nevertheless, Tsekhanovsky compiled four finished parts and the rest of material into a full movie. It wasn't released, but shelved instead "for better times" which never happened, as it was destroyed in fire caused by the 1941 bombings of Leningrad that hit Lenfilm. Vera Tsekhanovskaya managed to save only a small Bazaar segment. Shostakovich regarded the film's score among his best works ever done: "There are a number of pieces I'm happy with. Especially Balda — from start to finish". In 2005 one of his students restored the 50-minute score and released it to public.

== World War II ==
Tsekhanovsky's feelings were deeply hurt. He released his next long-planned short only in 1940. The Tale of a Silly Little Mouse turned a traditional children's film, although still free from cliches of its time. Once again he collaborated with Samuil Marshak and Dmitri Shostakovich whose score is performed independently at opera houses today.

The Tale of a Silly Little Mouse

Unlike Shostakovich who enjoyed working with Tsekhanovsky, Marshak was annoyed by the changes made to his script (including the more kids-friendly ending) and requested to edit the film, which led to a conflict between Lenfilm and Mosfilm management. Finally he agreed to withdraw most of the claims in exchange to his name being removed from the credits (done in the final edit lost during the war). The film was shot in full color using the three-color film process by the cinematographer Pavel Mershin and released to a moderate success.

In the meantime Tsekhanovsky had been teaching students who wanted to join his studio at Lenfilm. He prepared a whole generation of animators by 1941 when the Great Patriotic War started. The consequences were truly catastrophic: many were killed at fronts, others starved to death during the Siege of Leningrad. Tsekhanovsky himself barely survived the siege. He lost a lot of weight, he witnessed the fire that ruined Lenfilm and all its archives, the deaths of his colleagues including Ivan Druzhinin who was killed during the Winter War campaign. In 1942 he was evacuated to Samarkand along with his wife and joined Soyuzmultfilm where he had worked till his death.

== Moscow period ==
After the war Tsekhanovsky became known as one of the main supporters and promoters of rotoscoping (called Eclair by Russian animators after the Eclair video projector). Between 1948 and 1960 he produced a number of fairy tale adaptations that made excessive use of this technology to the point that actors who posed for the characters could be easily spotted. He stated that the use of realistic characters in a fairy tale would only emphasize on the fantasy element.

His films of that time received numerous awards at the international film festivals, including the 1949 Czech Film Festival at Mariánské Lázně (Best Children's Film for Rainbow-Flower), the 1951 Karlovy Vary International Film Festival (Best Animatied Film for The Tale of the Fisherman and the Fish) and the 1960 Mar del Plata International Film Festival (The Silver Oak Leaf for The Frog Princess).

With Fox, Beaver and the Rest (1960) Mikhail and Vera Tsekhanovsky started to make a return to their experimental past. Two satirical fables by Sergey Mikhalkov were presented by the author himself who was holding two pieces of paper with the drawn characters coming to life. In two years the couple released The Wild Swans based on H. C. Andersen's fairy tale which became the first Soviet widescreen animated feature. It was drawn in an original "formalistic" manner with a heavy Gothic influence.

Tsekhanovsky's last film — Post (1964) — was a remake of his first animated work. Also made as a traditionally animated widescreen short, it was seen by critics as a tribute to the constructivism traditions and featured many scenes borrowed directly from the 1929 version, as well as some of the original music.

Mikhail Tsekhanovsky died on 22 June 1965 and was buried in Moscow. He was survived by his wife Vera Tsekhanovskaya (25 December 1902 — 25 April 1977) who preserved her husband's diaries kept since the 1920s. In 2014 MasterFilm company released a documentary In Pursuit of the Lost Post where two specialists of the Moscow Film Research Institute — Nikolai Izvolov and Sergei Kapterev — traveled around the world, trying to find the fragments of the 1930 version of Post which had been considered to be lost.

== Filmography ==
- 1929 — Post (also art director)
- 1929 — Flag of the Nation (animated sequence, also artist)
- 1931 — Gopak
- 1931 — Pacific 231 (also screenwriter)
- 1933-1936 — The Tale of the Priest and of His Workman Balda (with Vera Tsekhanovskaya, also art director, unfinished)
- 1940 — The Tale of a Silly Little Mouse (also art director and screenwriter)
- 1941 — Film Concert 1941, also known as Leningrad Concert Hall and Russian Salad (Waltz of the Flowers sequence, also screenwriter)
- 1942 — A New Year Tree (with Peter Nosov)
- 1944 — The Telephone (also art director)
- 1948 — The Flower with Seven Colors
- 1950 — The Tale of the Fisherman and the Fish
- 1952 — Kashtanka
- 1954 — The Frog Princess
- 1956 — A Girl in the Jungle (with Vera Tsekhanovskaya)
- 1958 — A Tale of Chapayev (with Vera Tsekhanovskaya)
- 1959 — Legend of the Moor’s Legacy (with Vera Tsekhanovskaya)
- 1960 — Fox, Beaver and the Rest (with Vera Tsekhanovskaya)
- 1962 — The Wild Swans (with Vera Tsekhanovskaya)
- 1964 — Post (with Vera Tsekhanovskaya, also art director and screenwriter)
- 1966 — Ivan Ivanych Got Sick (sketches only)

== See also ==
- History of Russian animation
