= Glenn Vilppu =

American artist (born 1936)

- Born: August 9, 1936 (age 89); Hancock, Michigan
- Known for: Drawing, painting, animation

Glenn Valentin Vilppu (born August 9, 1936) is an American fine artist, draftsman, painter and art instructor. Vilppu is internationally known for teaching and training professionals in the animation industry. He has worked as a layout artist on numerous animated feature films and television shows with Walt Disney Animation Studios, Marvel Productions and Warner Bros. Animation. His books and videos are used by universities, art schools and independent students around the world.

Glenn Vilppu was born in 1936 in Hancock, Michigan though he spent his childhood in Finland, learning Finnish as his first language. He is of Finnish descent. Through his education in fine arts and his career in the American animation industry, he has developed a constructive approach of classical art while employing the movement of animation. In his more than 50 years of teaching he has focused on the logical and practical application of drawing. Glenn often cites his motto teaching visual communication to his students: “There are no rules, just tools.”

He has established the Vilppu Academy Online Art School as an international resource for students wishing to improve their drawing skills remotely. Vilppu’s approach to teaching drawing has become the standard for professional artists, used by numerous teachers and applied by tens of thousands of students.

Vilppu earned BFA and MFA Degrees in Fine Art at Art Center College of Design in Pasadena where he was an instructor for thirteen years. From there he started and operated his own school for five years teaching all subjects related to art. At the age of 40, Vilppu brought his approach to traditional figure drawing and composition to the animation industry, working for more than twenty years on feature film and television productions at Disney, Warner Bros. and Marvel Productions. He taught artists at these studios as well as at many game and special effects studios.

His draftsmanship was used as reference and teaching points by Walt Stanchfield who gave weekly classes and lectures at the Disney studio. These notes are referenced and published in Stanchfield's books: Drawn to Life: 20 Golden Years of Disney Master Classes.

He is the author of numerous books, including The Vilppu Drawing Manual. His drawing methods are regarded as the standard for professional artists. His approach has been applied by thousands of artists, animators and art professionals worldwide. Vilppu has taught annual workshops at Ringling College of Art and Design for well over a decade as well as sketching tours and workshops in Europe for the past twenty years. His annual tours, seminars and workshops extend throughout Europe, the Americas and Asia.

Glenn Vilppu is a founding member and contributing artist at New Masters Academy.
