= Vera Tsekhanovskaya =

Film director (1902–1977)

Vera Tsekhanovskaya (Russian: Вера Цехановская; born Vera Vseslavovna Shengelidze on December 25, 1902) was a Russian and Soviet animation director who died on April 25, 1977.

== Career ==
Between 1919 and 1922, Tsekhanovskaya worked as an architectural faculty member at Petrograd Polytechnic. Then from 1923 to 1924, she worked in the graphics department of the Leningrad Art and Industrial Technical School. She was also an illustrator at Raduga Publishing House around the same time. Finally in 1932, she became a cartoon artist in the department of military technical films of the Belgoskino film studio, which opened the doors for her to become an animator at the Leningrad film studio “Rosfilm” (later - “Lenfilm”) in 1933. During the evacuation of Samarkand, she entered the Soyuzmultfilm, where she worked as an animator and then an assistant director of cartoon films. Most of her work was done alongside her husband, Mikhail Tsekhanovsky. The married couple directed many animated films together, including The Wild Swans (1962), which was part of a dossier commemorating the centenary of the Russian Revolution.

== Filmography ==
=== Art director ===
- 1934: Bazar (Short)
- 1944: Telefon (Short)

=== Second unit director or assistant director ===
- 1948: Tsvetik-semitsvetik (Short)
- 1950: Skazka o rybake i rybke (Short)
- 1952: Kashtanka (Short)
- 1954: The Frog Princess (Short)
- 1956: The Tale of Chapayev

=== Director ===
- 1959: Legenda o zaveshchanii mavra (Short)
- 1961: Lisa, bobyor i drugie (Short)
- 1962: The Wild Swans
- 1966: Ivan Ivanych zabolel (Short)
- Stories from My Childhood (TV Series) (1 episode) - 1998 - The Wild Swans (1998)

=== Screenwriter ===
- 1964: Post/Mail (Short)

=== Production designer ===
- 1944: The Telephone

=== Animator ===
- 1938: Dzhyabzha (Short)

== See also ==
- History of Russian animation
- The Tale of the Priest and of His Workman Balda
- List of animated feature films of the 1960s
