= Ciechanów (disambiguation) =

Ciechanów may mean:

- Ciechanów, a town in Masovian Voivodeship, east-central Poland
- Ciechanów, Lower Silesian Voivodeship in Gmina Jemielno, Góra County in Lower Silesian Voivodeship, south-western Poland
- Ciechanów Voivodeship (1975–1998), an administrative division superseded by the Masovian Voivodeship, Poland
- Ciechanow Commune, a rural administrative district in Ciechanów County, Poland
- Ciechanów County, an administrative district in Masovian Voivodeship, east-central Poland
- Ciechanów District (1939–1945), an administrative region created when Nazi Germany annexed Poland

== See also ==
- Ciechanówek
- Ciechanover
