= The Tale of the Priest and of His Workman Balda (film) =

1930s partially lost animated film by Mikhail and Vera Tsekhanovsky

The only surviving Bazaar scene

The Tale of the Priest and of His Workman Balda (Сказка о попе и о работнике его Балде) is a partially lost Soviet feature length cartoon directed by the husband-and-wife team, Mikhail Tsekhanovsky and Vera Tsekhanovskaya. It is based on the eponymous fairy-tale in verse by Alexander Pushkin. The score was composed by Dmitri Shostakovich. The only surviving scene (2 1/2 minutes) is called Bazaar (Marketplace). The rest of the film reels were lost in the bombing of the Lenfilm studio during the Siege of Leningrad in 1941.

== History ==
In 1932, the Leningrad animator and experimentator Mikhail Tsekhanovsky launched his most ambitious project to date: an animated opera based on the fairy-tale in verse by the Russian classic Alexander Pushkin, yet with a heavy ROSTA posters influence. It was conceived as the first traditionally animated Soviet feature film that used the "album method" of animation, with characters drawn on paper instead of celluloid. The film was created at the Lenfilm animation studio headed by Tsekhanovsky and his wife who also served as the directors, leading artists and screenwriters.

In 1933, they contacted the young composer Dmitri Shostakovich and asked him to write music to accompany the film. They also invited an acclaimed poet Alexander Vvedensky shortly after his return from under arrest to write additional lyrics. Shostakovich loved the opportunity to compose an innovative satirical opera with abstract characters led by his music and not by someone else. He called it "a fairy-tale full of ardor, ease and joy, and writing music for it is just as easy and joyful". As Tsekhanovsky wrote during September 1934, "...he works incredibly fast without losing quality. True artist. True craftsman. Now it's up to me. I must create something worth of his music. I must. Balda is the only project where I can show what I'm capable of". They recorded 15 scenes by November.

Yet problems started early into the production. Tsekhanovsky, still inexperienced, was always behind the composer, facing organizational and financial problems. The first attempts to close Balda date back to 1933. In March 1936, studio executives persuaded the composer to reorchestrate his score from a symphony to chamber orchestra. Around the same time the infamous Muddle Instead of Music article was published in press, condemning Shostakovich's opera. Partially because the film now had no score, work on it was stopped and it was never completed.

Nevertheless, Tsekhanovsky compiled the four finished parts (around 40 minutes) and the rest of material into a full movie. Although the film was nearly finished, it was put into storage at the Lenfilm archives, where almost all of it was lost in a fire caused by the 1941 bombings of Leningrad that hit Lenfilm. Vera Tsekhanovskaya managed to save only the 4-minute Marketplace scene, and it stands alone as a classic of Russian animation. Mikhail Tsekhanovsky described the fate of his dream film as "a catastrophe".

== Music ==
Shostakovich considered his score for the film to be one of his best works. As he wrote, "There are a number of pieces I'm happy with. Especially Balda — from start to finish". After Shostakovich died, his widow arranged to have the score completed by one of Shostakovich's students, Vadim Bibergan. The world premiere recording of the 50-minute work was made by the Russian Philharmonic Orchestra conducted by Thomas Sanderling and released in 2006, a century after Shostakovich's birth.

The score was published in 2005, in volume 126 of DSCH Publishers' New Collected Works of Dmitri Shostakovich. This publication contains text in Russian and English.

=== Surviving and restored parts (DSCH, 2005) ===
A number of items were found either in the original composer's handwriting or that of a copier's; eleven others were found only in rough draft form with missing parts or harmonies, and were restored by Vadim Bibergan.

Name	Original	Copied	Draft
1. Overture	Yes	No	
2. Bazaar. Introduction	No	Yes	
3. Noisy Bazaar	Yes	No	
4. First Carousel	No	No	Yes
5. Balda's March	No	Yes	
6. Dance of the Bell-Ringer	Yes	No	
7. Second Carousel	No	Yes	
8. Bear's Dance	No	Yes	
9. Balda's Song	No	No	Yes
10. Balda's Meeting with the Priest	No	Yes	
11. Balda's Dialogue with the Priest	No	Yes	
12. Finale of Part One (March)	Yes	No	
13. The Village	No	Yes	
14. Balda's First Job	No	No	Yes
15. Priest Metropolitan. Tea-Drinking	No	Yes	
16. Overture for a Party	No	No	Yes
17. Lullaby	No	No	Yes
18. Priest's Daughter's Dream	No	Yes	
19. Waltz	No	No	Yes
20. Balda's Second Job	No	Yes	
21. Priest's Dance with the Devil	No	No	Yes
22. Dance of Dead Men	No	No	Yes
23. Procession of Ghouls	No	Yes	
24. Balda's Dialogue with Old Devil	Yes	Yes	
25. Balda's First Dialogue with Imp	Yes	Yes	
26. Devil's Couplets	No	No	Yes
27. Balda's Second Dialogue with Imp	Yes	Yes	
28. Three Fillips	No	No	Yes
29. Balda's Gallop	No	No	Yes

=== Instrumentation ===
==== Winds ====
Note: "1+" means that two instruments are specified, but only one part is written for them both to play.

Part	1	2	3	4	5	6	7	8	9	10	11	12	13	14	15	16	17	18	19	20	21	22	23	24	25	26	27	28	29
Piccolo (2)	-	1	1	1	1	1	1	2	-	1	1	1	1	1	1	-	-	-	-	1	-	1	1	1	1	1	1	2	2
Flute (2)	-	2	2	2	1	-	2	2	-	2	-	-	1	2	1	-	-	-	-	1+	1+	1+	2	1	1	1+	1	2	2
Oboe (2)	-	2	2	1	-	-	1	2	-	2	2	2	-	2	2	2	1	-	2	-	2	2	2	-	2	2	-	2	2
English horn	-	-	-	-	-	-	-	-	-	1	1	1	-	-	-	-	-	-	-	-	-	-	-	-	1	-	-	-	-
Clarinet in Eb	1	1	1	1	1	1	-	1	-	1	1	1	1	1	1	1	-	-	1	1	1	1	-	1	1	1	1	1	1
Clarinet in Bb (2)	2	1	2	2	2	2	2	2	-	2	2	-	1	2	2	2	2	-	2	1+	2	1+	2	1	2	2	1	2	2
Bass clarinet in Bb	-	-	-	1	-	-	1	-	-	-	-	-	-	-	-	-	-	-	-	1	-	-	-	-	-	-	-	-	-
Soprano sax in Bb (2)	-	-	1	-	-	2	-	-	-	-	-	-	-	-	-	1	-	-	-	-	-	1+	-	1	-	1	-	-	-
Tenor sax in Bb	-	-	-	-	-	-	-	-	-	-	-	-	-	-	-	-	-	1	-	-	-	-	-	-	-	-	-	-	-
Bassoon (2)	1	1	-	-	2	2	1	2	-	2	1	1	2	2	1	2	1	2	2	2	2	2	2	2	2	2	2	2	2
Contrabassoon	-	1	-	-	-	-	1	1	-	1	-	1	-	-	-	1	-	1	1	1	1	1	1	1	1	-	-	1	1
Horn in F (4)	-	2	3	-	2	-	-	4	-	2	2	-	2	4	2	4	1	-	3	4	4	2+	2+	2	2	4	2	2+	3+
Trumpet in Bb (3)	2	3	3	-	2	2	-	3	-	1	1	1	2	2	2	1	-	-	-	2	1	3	2	2	2	3	2	2	2
Euphonium	-	1	-	-	-	-	-	-	-	-	-	-	-	-	-	-	-	-	-	-	-	-	-	-	-	-	-	-	-
Trombone (3)	1	2	1+	-	2	1	-	3	-	3	1	1	1	3	2	2+	-	1	1	3	1+	3	3	1	1+	3	2	3	3
Tuba	1	1	1	-	1	1	-	1	-	1	1	1	-	1	1	1	-	-	-	1	1	1	1	-	-	1	-	1	1

==== Strings ====
Note: the exact number of violin/viola/cello/contrabass players is not indicated, except in pieces where only one instrument is to play.

Part	1	2	3	4	5	6	7	8	9	10	11	12	13	14	15	16	17	18^{1}	19	20	21	22	23	24	25	26	27	28	29
Violins I & II	-	-	-	-	-	-	-	+	-	-	-	-	-	+	-	-	+	+	+	+	+	+	+	-	+	+	-	-	+
Viola	-	-	-	-	-	-	-	+	-	-	-	-	-	+	-	-	+	+	+	+	+	+	+	-	-	+	-	-	+
Cello	-	+	-	-	-	-	-	+	-	+	-	-	-	+	-	-	+	+	+	+	+	+	+	-	-	+	-	+	+
Contrabass	1	+	-	-	-	+	-	+	-	+	-	-	-	+	-	-	+	+	+	+	+	+	+	-	-	+	-	+	+
Harp	-	-	1	1	-	1	-	-	-	-	-	-	-	-	-	1	1	-	1	1	-	1	1	1	1	-	1	-	-
Russian guitar	-	-	-	-	-	-	-	-	-	-	-	-	-	-	-	-	-	1	-	-	-	-	-	-	-	-	-	-	-
Balalaika	-	-	-	-	-	-	-	-	1	-	-	-	-	-	-	-	-	-	-	-	-	-	-	-	-	-	-	-	-

^{1}The violin, viola, cello and contrabass parts are only present for one loud chord at the end of the piece.

==== Keyboards and tuned percussion ====
Part	1	2	3	4	5	6	7	8	9	10	11	12	13	14	15	16	17	18	19	20	21	22	23	24	25	26	27	28	29
Timpani	1	1	1	-	1	-	-	1	-	-	-	-	1	1	-	-	-	-	-	-	-	1	1	1	1	-	1	-	1
Glockenspiel	-	-	-	-	-	-	-	-	-	-	-	-	1	-	-	-	-	-	-	-	-	-	-	-	-	-	-	-	-
Xylophone	-	1	1	-	1	-	-	1	-	1	1	-	1	1	-	-	-	1	1	1	1	1	1	1	1	-	1	-	1
Chimes	-	-	1	-	-	1	-	-	-	-	-	-	1	-	-	-	-	-	-	-	-	-	-	-	-	-	-	-	-
Accordion	-	-	1	-	-	-	-	-	-	-	-	-	-	-	-	-	-	-	-	-	-	-	-	-	-	-	-	-	-

==== Other percussion ====
Names in italics are in their original Italian.

Part	1	2	3	4	5	6	7	8	9	10	11	12	13	14	15	16	17	18	19	20	21	22	23	24	25	26	27	28	29
Triangle	-	-	1	-	-	-	-	1	-	-	-	-	-	1	-	-	-	-	-	-	-	-	-	-	-	-	-	-	-
Whistle	-	-	1	-	-	-	-	-	-	-	-	-	-	-	-	-	-	-	-	-	-	-	-	-	-	-	-	-	-
Vetro (Glass)	-	-	1	-	-	-	-	-	-	-	-	-	-	-	-	-	-	-	-	-	-	-	-	-	-	-	-	-	-
Wood block (2)	-	1	1	-	-	-	-	-	-	1	1	1	1	-	-	-	-	1	1	1	-	2	-	1	1	-	1	-	-
Raganella	-	-	1	-	-	-	-	-	-	-	-	-	1	-	-	-	-	-	-	-	-	-	-	-	-	-	-	-	-
Whip	-	-	1	-	-	-	-	-	-	-	-	-	-	-	-	-	-	-	-	-	-	-	-	-	-	-	-	-	-
Pistola	-	-	1	-	-	-	-	-	-	-	-	-	-	-	-	-	-	-	-	-	-	-	-	-	-	-	-	-	-
Tambourine	-	-	1	-	-	-	-	1	-	-	-	-	1	-	-	-	-	-	-	-	-	-	-	-	1	-	-	-	-
Tamburo	-	-	1	-	1	-	-	1	-	-	-	1	1	1	-	-	-	-	1	1	-	1	-	-	-	-	-	1	1
Suspended cymbal	-	-	1	-	1	-	-	1	-	-	-	1	-	-	1	-	-	-	-	1	-	-	1	-	-	-	1	1	-
Crash cymbal	-	-	-	-	-	-	-	1	-	-	-	-	-	-	-	-	-	-	-	-	-	1	-	-	-	-	-	-	-
Bass drum (Cassa)	-	1	1	-	-	-	-	1	-	-	-	-	-	-	1	-	-	-	-	-	-	1	-	-	-	-	1	1	-

==== Voices ====
Note: the exact number of choralists is mostly not indicated; "2+" means that there are at least two harmonic lines somewhere in a part, or at least 2 voices are specifically called for.

Part	1	2	3	4	5	6	7	8	9	10	11	12	13	14	15	16	17	18	19	20	21	22	23	24	25	26	27	28	29
Narrator (child's voice (boy))	-	-	-	-	-	-	-	-	-	+	-	-	-	-	-	-	-	-	-	-	-	-	-	+	+	-	+	-	-
Balda (bass)	-	-	-	-	-	-	-	-	+	-	+	-	-	-	-	-	+	+	-	-	-	-	-	+	+	-	+	-	-
Priest (2 voices: tenor and bass)	-	-	-	-	-	-	-	-	+	-	+	-	-	-	-	-	-	-	-	-	-	-	-	-	-	-	-	-	-
Priest's Wife (bass)	-	-	-	-	-	-	-	-	-	-	-	-	-	-	-	-	+	-	-	-	-	-	-	-	-	-	-	-	-
Priest's Daughter (soprano)	-	-	-	-	-	-	-	-	-	-	-	-	-	-	-	-	+	-	-	-	-	-	-	-	-	-	-	-	-
Old Demon (2 voices: mezzo-soprano and bass)	-	-	-	-	-	-	-	-	-	-	-	-	-	-	-	-	-	-	-	-	-	-	-	+	-	-	-	-	-
Imp (descant)	-	-	-	-	-	-	-	-	-	-	-	-	-	-	-	-	-	-	-	-	-	-	-	-	+	-	+	-	-
Devil/Chyort (bass-baritone)	-	-	-	-	-	-	-	-	-	-	-	-	-	-	-	-	-	-	-	-	-	-	-	-	-	+	-	-	-
Chorus (sopranos)	-	-	4+	-	-	-	-	-	-	-	+	1+	+	+	-	-	-	-	-	-	-	-	-	-	+	-	-	-	-
Chorus (altos)	-	-	1+	-	-	-	-	-	-	-	+	-	+	+	-	-	-	-	-	-	-	-	-	-	+	-	-	-	-
Chorus (tenors)	-	-	9+	-	-	-	-	-	-	-	+	1+	+	-	-	-	-	-	-	-	-	-	-	-	+	-	-	-	-
Chorus (basses)	-	-	5+	-	-	-	-	-	-	-	+	2+	+	-	-	-	-	-	-	-	-	-	-	-	2+	-	-	-	-
