= I'd Love to Take Orders from You =

1936 film by Fred Avery

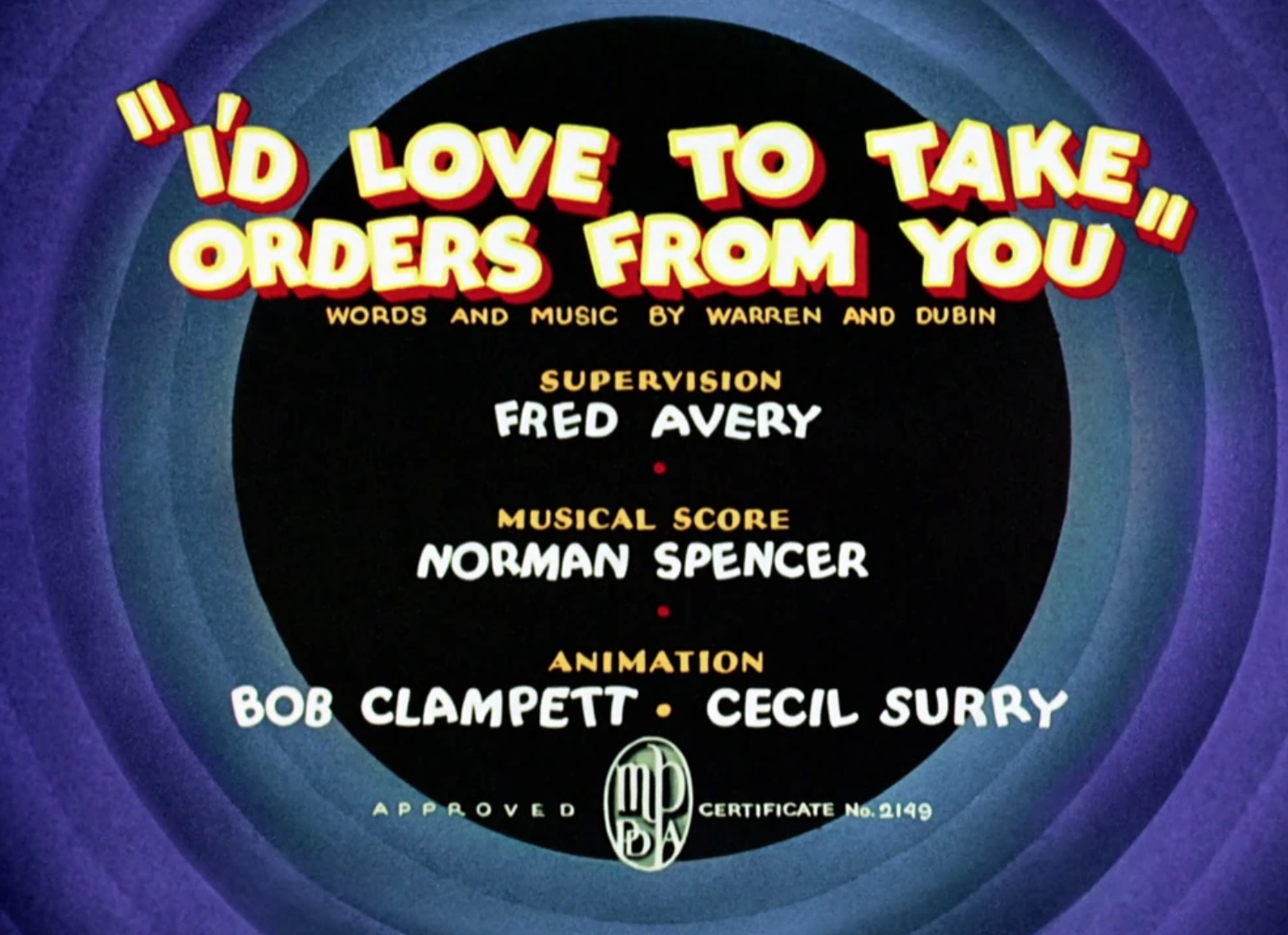
- Title card
- Directed by: Fred Avery
- Produced by: Leon Schlesinger
- Music by: Norman Spencer
- Animation by: Bob Clampett; Cecil Surry
- Color process: Technicolor
- Production company: Leon Schlesinger Productions
- Distributed by: Warner Bros. Productions; The Vitaphone Corporation
- Release date: May 16, 1936
- Running time: 7 min
- Country: United States
- Language: English

I'd Love to Take Orders from You is a 1936 American animated comedy short film directed by Fred Avery. The short was released on May 16, 1936. It is the 58th film in the Merrie Melodies series.

== Plot ==
A scarecrow scares a crow from eating a conveniently placed corn cob. He checks his hourglass and realizes his work is done, so he happily goes home, commenting on the absurdity that he has a house, wife and child. He teaches his son how to scare crows while singing the titular song. He makes his son do scary poses in quick succession as his training. He is then made to go to sleep, praying that he can be like his father beforehand.

The next morning, the child scarecrow quickly sneaks out of bed, being confident that he will be able to do his job when he scares a cowardly rooster without effort. He then scares a squirrel who goes up a tree through an illogically placed elevator inside. After scaring a rabbit, he arrives at his father's workplace, where a crow has landed to eat more corn. The crow gleefully eats a corn cob as he realizes the child scarecrow is of no threat, and chases him through the cornfield, grazing a line of corn to the point the remains neatly stack. He tries to alternate running from the crow and posing to no effect, only for one random pose to greatly scare the crow. It is then revealed that it happened due to the father scarecrow's intervention, which the child scarecrow does not realize until he walks into his father's knee. After they return home, the child scarecrow attempts to explain the entire ordeal and claim it as his own, only to be scared by his father making a hand shadow resembling a crow.

== Home media ==
This short is available on disc 1 of the Looney Tunes Collector's Vault: Volume 1 Blu-ray set.
