= ROSTA windows =

Soviet Union propaganda

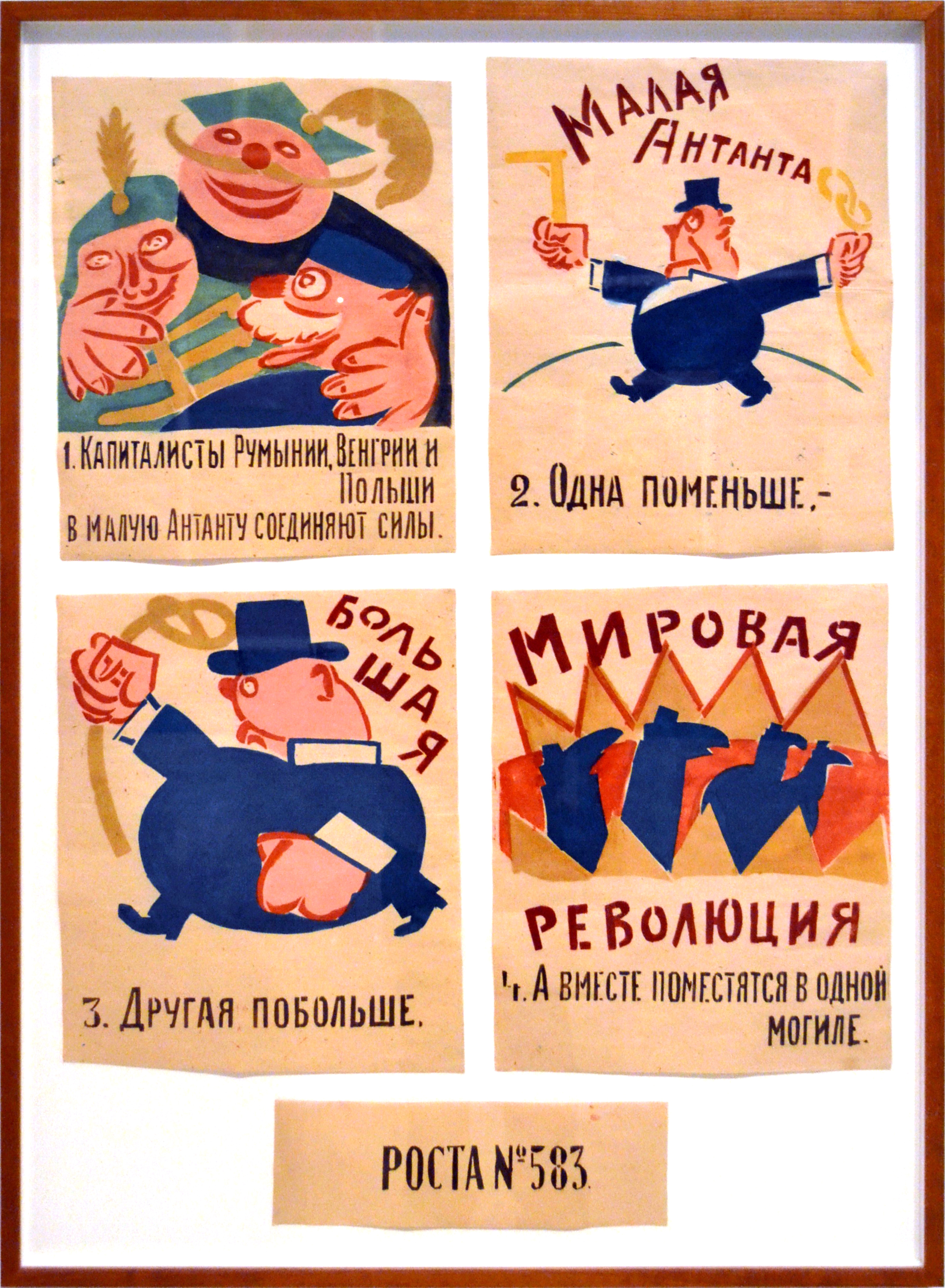
Vladimir Mayakovsky. "Window" № 583. Caption: "1. The capitalists of Romania, Hungary and Poland are joining forces for the Little Entente. 2. One is smaller. 3. The other is bigger. 4. But together they will be fit in one grave."

ROSTA windows (also known as ROSTA windows of satire or ROSTA posters, Russian: Окна сатиры РОСТА, Окна РОСТА, ROSTA being an acronym for the Russian Telegraph Agency, the state news agency from 1918 to 1935) were a propagandistic medium of communication used in the Soviet Union to deliver important messages and instill specific beliefs and ideology within the minds of the masses.

Rosta posters were a highly popularized form of communication used by the Russian government between 1919 and 1921. The posters were used to communicate mass messages and propaganda during the Russian Civil War. Once the war came to an end, the Russian government turned to new forms of communication.

Rosta posters were easily identifiable by their context and distinct style.

== Examples ==
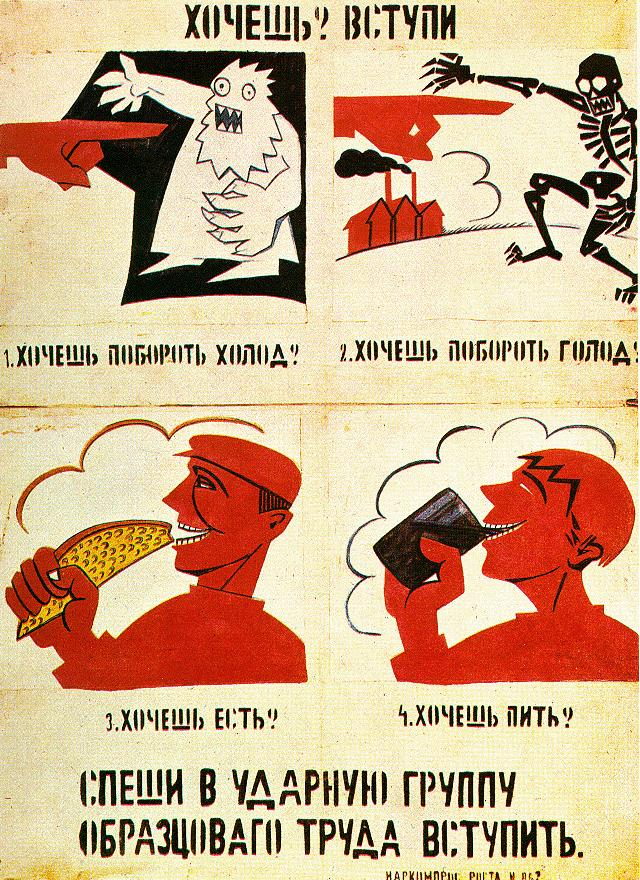
Vladimir Mayakovsky, "Want it? Join"

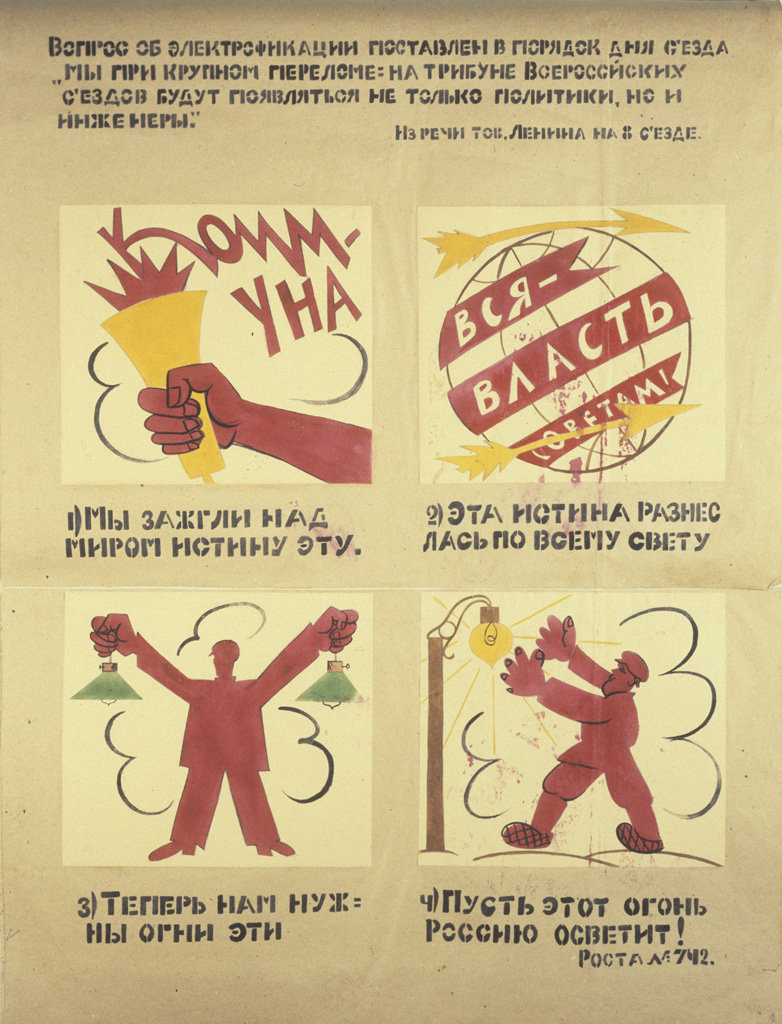
Vladimir Mayakovsky, "Poster #742"

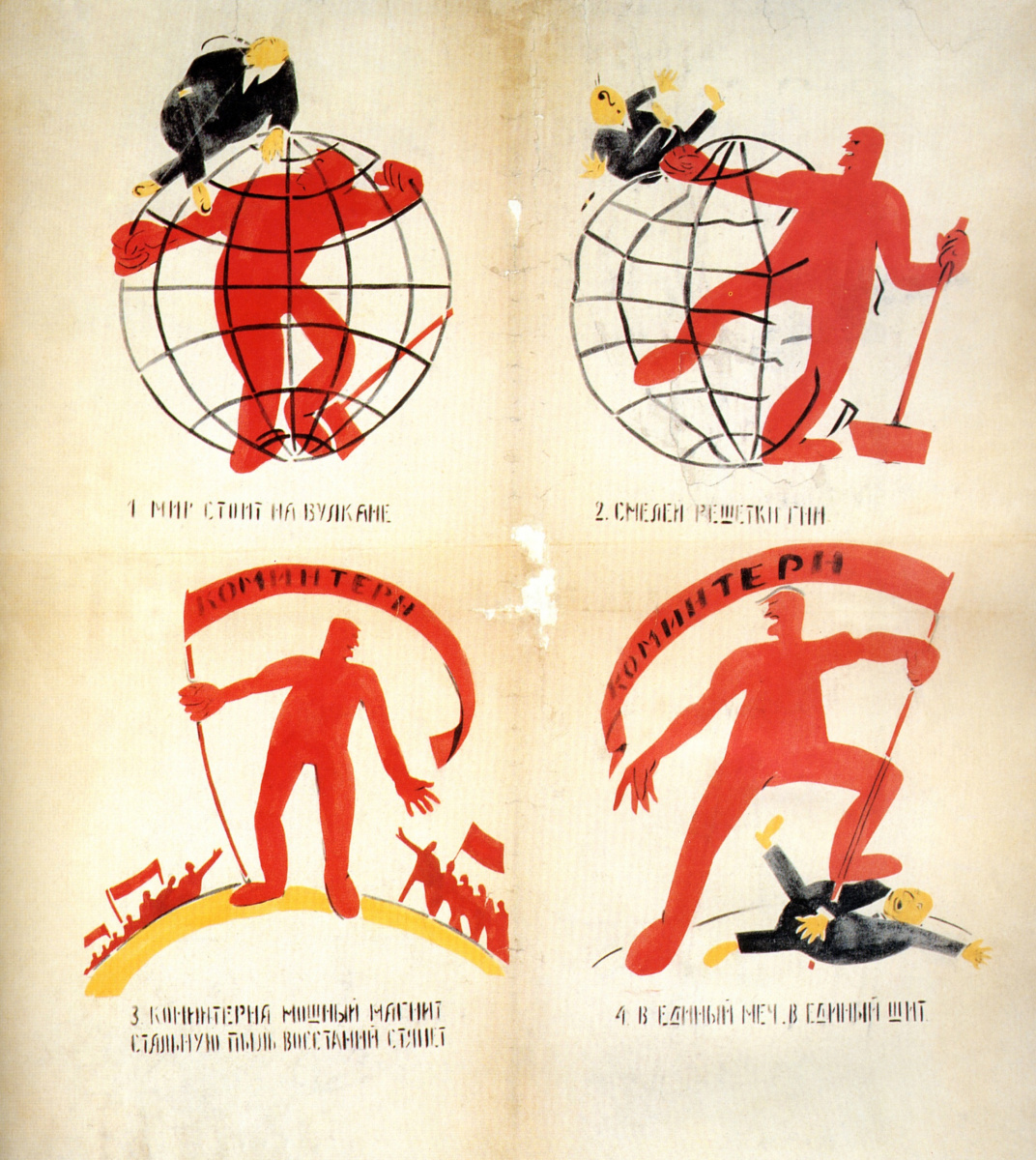
Mayakovsky, "Мир стоит на вулкане"

== See also ==
- TASS windows, the Soviet News Agency's series of hand-printed propaganda posters during World War II 1941 – 1945
- Agitprop
