= Boris Zhitkov =

Soviet and Russian writer

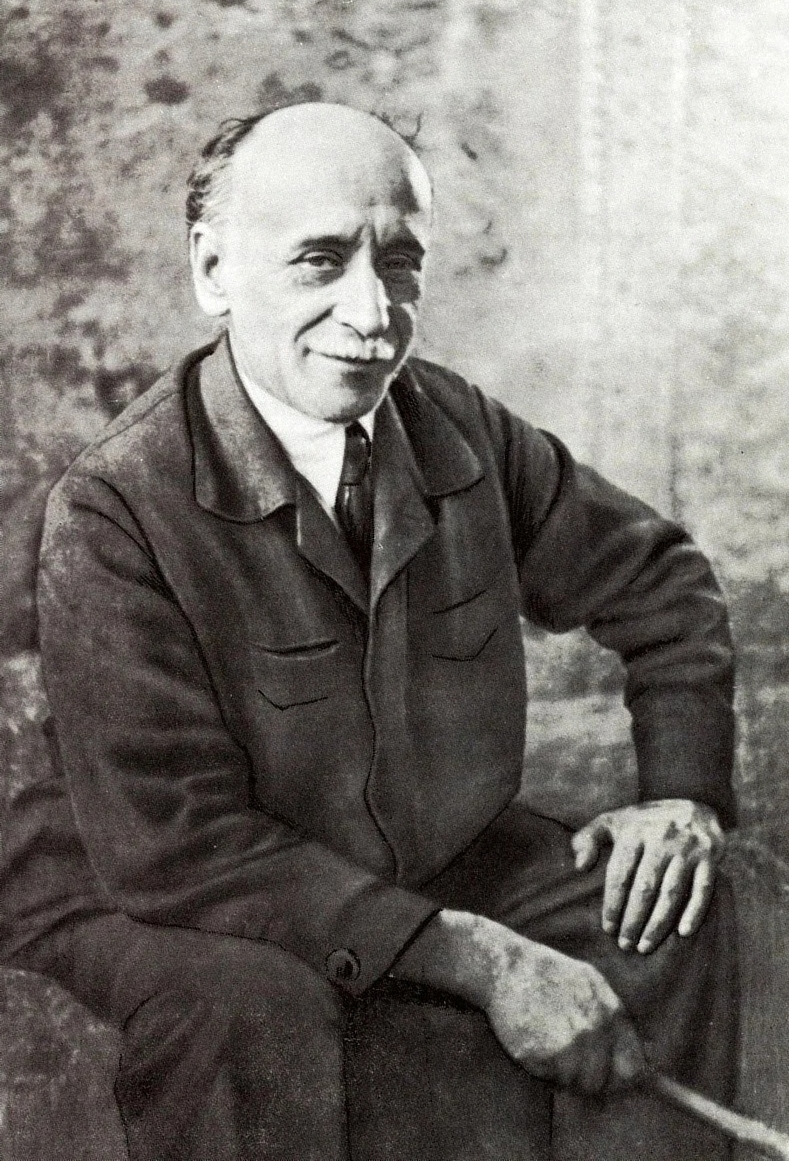
- Born: 11 September [O.S. 30 August] 1882; Novgorod, Russian Empire
- Died: 19 October 1938 (aged 56); Moscow, USSR
- Occupations: Novelist, short story writer, playwright
- Writing career
- Notable work: Viktor Vavich

Boris Stepanovich Zhitkov (Russian: Бори́с Степа́нович Житко́в; 11 September [O.S. 30 August] 1882 – 19 October 1938) was a writer from the Russian Empire and later the Soviet Union, mainly known as the author of children's books and the novel Viktor Vavich about the 1905 Russian Revolution.

== Biography ==
Zhitkov was born in Novgorod; his father worked as a mathematics teacher and his mother was a pianist. His works include numerous books in which he, in a figurative form, described various professions. His books are based on his rich experience as a sailor and then ship captain, scientist, traveler and explorer. He also worked as a navigator, an ichthyologist, a metal worker, a shipbuilding engineer, a teacher of physics and drafting, and a technical college headmaster. Zhitkov personally participated in the 1905 Russian Revolution.

In 1924 Zhitkov started to be published and soon became a professional writer. He is best known for the children's travel book What I Saw (Russian: Что я видел) about the summer vacation adventures of a curious little boy nicknamed Pochemuchka (Russian: Почемучка, a new word coined by Zhitkov from Почему, meaning Why?). Zhitkov was a close friend of Korney Chukovsky, who wrote in his diary entry for 28 December 1931:

Zhitkov is all upset about the self-flagellation going on among critics at the Writers' Union. He says that at the meeting where Eikhenbaum was asked to practice self-criticism, Eikhenbaum responded, "Self-criticism should be practiced before one writes, not after." [...] Zhitkov's interpretation of the now famous meeting runs as follows: "We're all just so many sons of bitches, so let's pull down our pants and let ourselves be whipped."

Zhitkov's historical novel about the 1905 Revolution, Viktor Vavich (Russian: Виктор Вавич), published posthumously in 1941, was immediately destroyed and republished in 1999 only thanks to Lydia Chukovskaya having saved a copy; Boris Pasternak called it "the best thing that has ever been written about 1905; it's a shame that nobody knows this book."

Zhitkov also featured as a character in Samuil Marshak's children's poem "Post" from 1927. The poem was adapted for screen in a 1964 animated film, where Zhitkov was voiced by actor Erast Garin.

On July 10, 1939, Pravda, the newspaper of the Communist Party, ran a feature on him in which his book What I saw was very much praised.

== Publications ==
Zhitkov B. Angry Sea. — 1924
Zhitkov B. Sea Stories. — 1925
Zhitkov B. Black Sails. — 1927
Zhitkov B. Heads or Tails. — 1928
Zhitkov B. Locomotives. — 1928
Zhitkov B. Boa Constrictor. — 1928
Zhitkov B. Stone Seal. — 1931
Zhitkov B. Sea Stories. — 1931
Zhitkov B. Sea Short Stories. — 1935
Zhitkov B. Short Stories about Animals. — 1935
Zhitkov B. Sea Stories. — 1937
Zhitkov B. What I Saw. — 1939
Zhitkov B. Short Stories. — 1940
Zhitkov B. Short Stories about Animals. — 1940
Zhitkov B. Viktor Vavich. — 1941
Zhitkov B. Short Stories about Technology. — 1942
Zhitkov B. Red Commander. — 1956 — (My First Books).
Zhitkov B. How I Hunted the Little Fellows / Illustrations by Paul O. Zelinsky. - 1979
Zhitkov B. About an Elephant: Short Stories / Illustrations by N. Petrova. — 1980
Zhitkov B. Seven Fires: Sketches, Short Stories, Narrative, Plays — 1982
Zhitkov B. Selected Works (Introductory article by K. I. Chukovsky). — 1988
Zhitkov B. Selected works (Composition, introductory article and notes by V. Glotser). — 1989
Zhitkov B. Short Stories about Animals. — 1989
Zhitkov B. Short Stories for Children. — 1998
Zhitkov B. Viktor Vavich. — 1999
Zhitkov B. How I Used to Catch Little Men: Short Stories. — 2001
Zhitkov B. Viktor Vavich. — 2007
Zhitkov B. I Will Mend My Ways!. — 2011
Zhitkov B. Magazine for Kids "Vorobey" ("Sparrow").
