= The Wild Swans (1962 film) =

- Original Russian poster
- Directed by: Vera Tsekhanovskaya; Mikhail Tsekhanovsky
- Written by: Yevgeniy Ryss; Leonid Trauberg; Mikhail Volpin (lyrics)
- Based on: The Wild Swans by Hans Christian Andersen
- Starring: Sergei Martinson; K. Ustyugov; Anatoliy Shchukin; Askold Besedin; V. Tumanova; Erast Garin; Viktor Sergachev; Yelena Ponsova; R. Chumak
- Edited by: V. Turubiner
- Music by: Aleksandr Varlamov
- Release date: 1962 (USSR)
- Running time: 59 minutes
- Country: Soviet Union
- Language: Russian

The Wild Swans (Russian: Дикие лебеди, Dikiye lebedi) is a 1962 Soviet traditionally animated feature film directed by the husband-and-wife team of Mikhail Tsekhanovsky and Vera Tsekhanovskaya. The film is based on the story of the same name by Hans Christian Andersen. Unusual for Soviet films of this period, and especially for animated films, it was produced in widescreen. It was produced at the Soyuzmultfilm studio in Moscow.

== Plot ==
The princess Elisa and her eleven brothers live in peace and happiness until their father marries again and brings home a new queen. She turns out to be an evil witch. With her magic, she tries to curse Elisa, but Elisa's good heart repel the curse. Instead, the queen resorts to blackening Elisa's face and dirtying her hair, making her unrecognisable. She also attempts to turn the eleven princes into black, ugly birds, but because of their good hearts, the curse is only partly successful: they turn into beautiful white swans.

The queen chases them out of the castle, and the next morning, Elisa is chased out as well because her father didn't recognise her. Left with nothing, she sets out to find her brothers. After many years, she finally finds them, and after learning from a crow that the curse can be broken by herself, she has to knit eleven sweaters out of tall, burning nettles, and has to take a vow of silence until the last sweater is finished and not be distracted.

While she works on the sweaters, she meets a king who falls in love with her and lets her live in his castle. An archbishop conspires with the King's fiancé, his (the archbishop's) niece, to get rid of her by making people think she is a witch. She is almost burnt on the stake, but at the last second, her brothers come to the rescue. She throws the sweaters over them, the curse is broken, and she is able to tell her story and return the king's love.

== Home video releases ==
- DVD: Золотая коллекция любимых мультфильмов – 4. PAL, no subtitles. Contains: The Wild Swans, Argonauts (20 min), The Boatswain and the Parrot (series 1–4, 38 min), A Blue Puppy (20 min)
- VHS and MPEG-4 versions containing only the film

== Creators ==
	English	Russian
Screenplay by	Evgeny Ryss; Leonid Trauberg	Евгений Рысс; Леонид Трауберг
Lyrics by	Mikhail Volpin	Михаил Вольпин
Directed by	Mikhail and Vera Tsekhanovskys	Михаил и Вера Цехановские
Production designers	Nathan Lerner; Max Zherebchevsky	Натан Лернер; Макс Жеребчевский
Art directors	Boris Korneev; Dmitry Anpilov	Борис Корнеев; Дмитрий Анпилов
Music by	Alexander Varlamov	Александр Варламов
Director of photography	Elena Petrova	Елена Петрова
First assistant cameraman	Svetlana Kashcheeva	Светлана Кащеева
Sound engineer	Boris Filchikov	Борис Фильчиков
Character animation	Elena Hludova; Victor Shevkov; Valentin Kushneryov; Renata Mirenkova; Lidiya Reztsova; N. Chernova; Faina Yepifanova; Konstantin Chikin; Tatyana Taranovich; Vladimir Zarubin; Boris Butakov; Ivan Davydov; Vyacheslav Kotyonochkin; Tatyana Pomerantseva; O. Sysoyeva; L. Rybchevskaya; N. Avstriyskaya; E. Vershinina; K. Malyshev; V. Maksimovich; V. Rogov; Erast Meladze	Елена Хлудова; Виктор Шевков; Валентин Кушнерёв; Рената Миренкова; Лидия Резцова; Н. Чернова; Фаина Епифанова; Константин Чикин; Татьяна Таранович; Владимир Зарубин; Борис Бутаков; Иван Давыдов; Вячеслав Котёночкин; Татьяна Померанцева; О. Сысоева; Л. Рыбчевская; Н. Австрийская; Е. Вершинина; К. Малышев; В. Максимович; В. Рогов; Эраст Меладзе
Assistant directors	Lidiya Nikitina; Elena Turanova	Лидия Никитина; Елена Туранова
Assistant editor	V. Turubiner	В. Турубинер
Script editor	Z. Pavlova	З. Павлова
With the voice Talents of:	Valentina Tumanova as Elisa; Elena Ponsova as the Queen, the Old Woman, and the Crow; Victor Sergachyov as the young king Erast Garin as the Archbishop; Sergey Martinson as the Royal Majordomo; Anatoly Shchukin as the King; Robert Chumak; Konstantin Ustyugov; Askold Besedin — as narrator and singing voice of the young king	Валентина Туманова (Элиза); Елена Понсова (королева, старушка и ворона); Виктор Сергачёв (молодой король — речь); Эраст Гарин (епископ); Сергей Мартинсон (приказчик короля); Анатолий Щукин (король); Роберт Чумак; Константин Устюгов; Аскольд Беседин (от автора/молодой король — вокал)
Executive producer	G. Kruglikov	Г. Кругликов

== Art features ==
The Crow explains to Elisa that there is a way to reverse her brother's "swan" curse.

The film expert Pyotr Bagrov in the analysis of the Soviet "andersen's" filmography puts the animated film The Wild Swans on a special place, separating its literary basis from other fairy-tales of Andersen, describing this version not as the fairy-tale, but as ancient Danish legend. In comparison with other animated screen versions, there is also a graphic manner in which the tape is created: "The extended, "Gothic" people and rocks — and at the same time the plane, medieval and primitive image". Bagrov also notes that the film is typical for game cinema, but rare in animation parallel installation.

== English versions ==
Three different English versions of the film exists, each one heavily re-edited and with different soundtracks.

The first English release in 1964 was done by CCM Films under the banner CARTOON CLASSICS, INC., with ADR Script and direction by Bernard Evslin. This version rearranges shots from the movie and adds narration in scenes where there originally weren't and some of the musical numbers were cut.

The second English release was done in 1986 by Kidpix and released on video by Just For Kids under the title Swans. This version replaces the songs with pop songs from the music group Bullets.

The third dub was done in 1995 by Films by Jove for the series Stories from My Childhood. This version rearranges scenes and totally rebus the music score with a new one provided by Thomas Chase and Steve Rucker, as well as all new songs by Rucker, Chase, and Pamela Phillips Oland. This version also includes celebrities such as Cathy Moriarty, Danielle Brisebois, Jo Beth Williams, and James Coburn. This episode was briefly released on DVD by Image Entertainment.

== See also ==
- History of Russian animation
- List of animated feature-length films
