= The Tale of the Fisherman and the Fish =

1835 fairy tale

- Short story by Alexander Pushkin
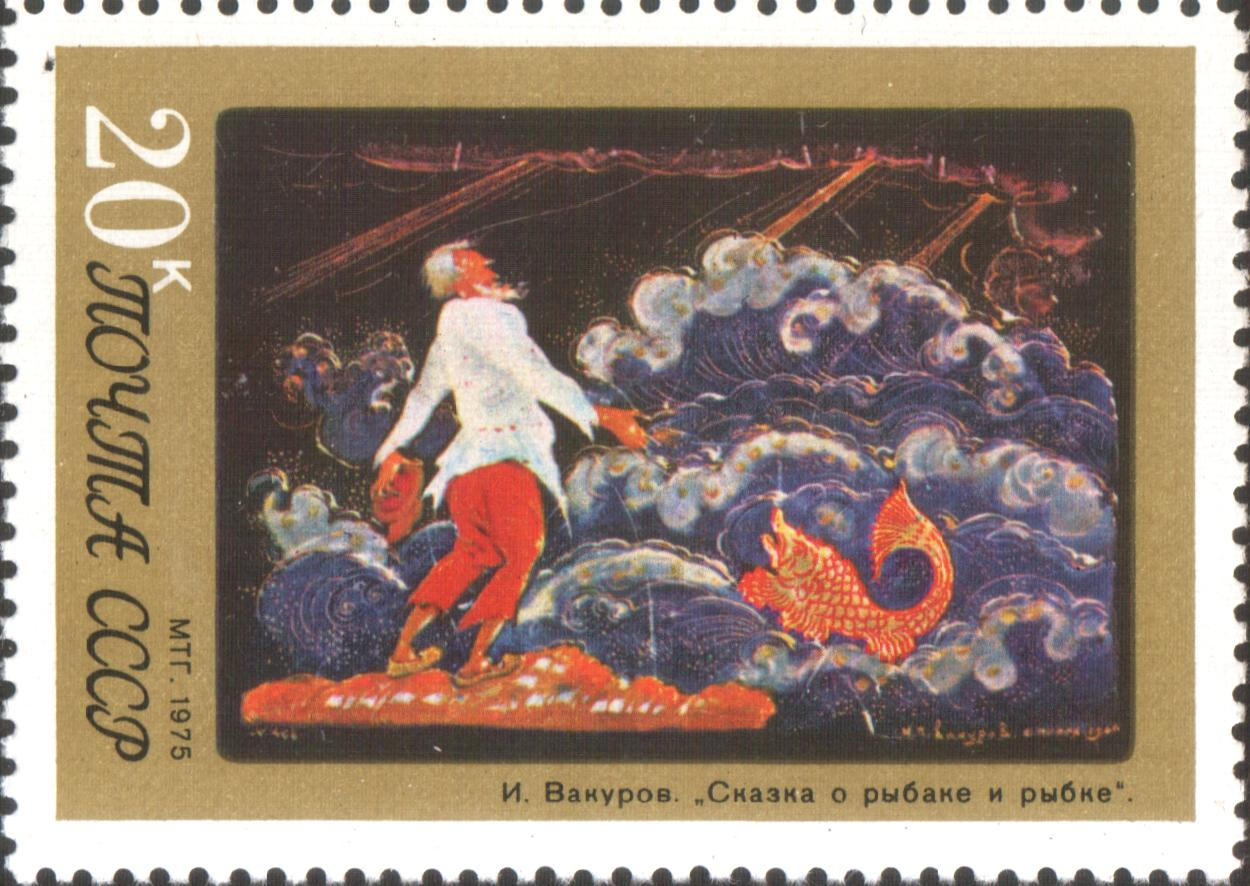
- The fairy tale commemorated on a Soviet Union stamp
- Original title: Сказка о рыбаке и рыбке
- Country: Russian Empire
- Language: Russian
- Genre: Fairy tale in verse

Publication
- Published in: Biblioteka dlya chteniya
- Publication type: Literary magazine
- Publication date: May 1835

Chronology
The Tale of the Dead Princess and the Seven Knights	The Tale of the Golden Cockerel

The Tale of the Fisherman and the Fish (Russian: «Сказка о рыбаке и рыбке», romanized: Skazka o rybake i rybke) is a fairy tale in verse by Alexander Pushkin, published 1835.

The tale is about a fisherman who manages to catch a "Golden Fish" which promises to fulfill any wish of his in exchange for its freedom.

== Textual notes ==
Pushkin wrote the tale in autumn 1833 and it was first published in the literary magazine Biblioteka dlya chteniya in May 1835.

=== Grimms' Tales ===
Several notable scholars believe that Pushkin's is an original tale based on the Grimms' tale, "The Fisherman and His Wife". (Note: D. N. Medrish also opining that "we have folklore texts that arose under the indisputable Pushkin influence".)

Mark Azadovsky wrote monumental articles on Pushkin's sources, his nurse "Arina Rodionovna", and the "Brothers Grimm" demonstrating that tales recited to Pushkin in his youth were often recent translations propagated "word of mouth to a largely unlettered peasantry", rather than tales passed down in Russia, as John Bayley explains.

Still, in Bayley's estimation, the derivative nature does not diminish the reader's ability to appreciate "The Fisherman and the Fish" as "pure folklore", though at a lesser scale than other masterpieces. In a similar vein, Sergei Mikhailovich Bondi emphatically accepted Azadovsky's verdict on Pushkin's use of Grimm material, but emphasized that Pushkin still crafted Russian fairytales out of them.

In a draft version, Pushkin has the fisherman's wife wishing to be the Roman Pope, thus betraying his influence from the Brothers Grimm's telling, where the wife also aspires to be a she-Pope.

=== Afanasyev's collection ===
The tale is also very similar in plot and motif to the folktale "The Goldfish" (Russian: Золотая рыбка) which is No. 75 in Alexander Afanasyev's collection (1855–1867), which is obscure as to its collected source.

Russian scholarship abounds in discussion of the interrelationship between Pushkin's verse and Afanasyev's skazka. Pushkin had been shown Vladimir Dal's collection of folktales. He seriously studied genuine folktales, and literary style was spawned from absorbing them, but conversely, popular tellings were influenced by Pushkin's published versions also.

At any rate, after Norbert Guterman's English translation of Asfaneyev's "The Goldfish" (1945) appeared, Stith Thompson included it in his One Hundred Favorite Folktales, so this version became the referential Russian variant for the ATU 555 tale type.

=== English translations ===
In 2012, Robert Chandler published an English translation, A Tale about a Fisherman and a Fish (2012).

== Plot summary ==
In Pushkin's poem, an old man and woman have been living poorly for many years. They have a small hut, and every day the man goes out to fish. One day, he throws in his net and pulls out seaweed two times in succession, but on the third time he pulls out a golden fish. The fish pleads for its life, promising any wish in return. However, the old man is scared by the fact that a fish can speak; he says he does not want anything, and lets the fish go.

When he returns and tells his wife about the golden fish, she gets angry and tells her husband to go ask the fish for a new trough, as theirs is broken, and the fish happily grants this small request. The next day, the wife asks for a new house, and the fish grants this also. Then, in succession, the wife asks for a palace, to become a noble lady, to become the ruler of her province, to become the tsarina, and finally to become the Ruler of the Sea and to subjugate the golden fish completely to her boundless will. As the man goes to ask for each item, the sea becomes more and more stormy, until the last request, where the man can hardly hear himself think. When he asks that his wife be made the Ruler of the Sea, the fish cures her greed by putting everything back to the way it was before, including the broken trough.

== Analysis ==
The Afanasiev version "The Goldfish" is catalogued as Aarne–Thompson–Uther type 555, "(The) Fisherman and his Wife", the type title deriving from the representative tale, the Brothers Grimm's The Fisherman and His Wife.

The tale exhibits the "function" of "lack" to use the terminology of Vladimir Propp's structural analysis, but even while the typical fairy tale is supposed to "liquidate' the lack with a happy ending, this tale type breaches the rule by reducing the Russian couple back to their original state of dire poverty, hence it is a case of "lack not liquidated". The Proppian structural analysis sets up "The Goldfish" tale for comparison with a similar Russian fairy tale, "The Greedy Old Woman (Wife)".

== Legacy ==
- The fable is referenced in book three of Dostoevsky's Brothers Karamazov, when Mitya compares Alyosha's arrival to the fish's return and ability to grant wishes: Oh, gods, I thank you for sending him by the back‐way, and he came to me like the golden fish to the silly old fishermen in the fable!
- In the season one episode "The Stars Our Destiny" of the series 3 Body Problem, Dr. Will Downing references the story, using it as inspiration to name his new pet goldfish Pushkin.

== Adaptations ==
- 1866 - Le Poisson doré (The Golden Fish), "fantastic ballet", choreography by Arthur Saint-Léon, the music by Ludwig Minkus.
- 1917 - The Fisherman and the Fish by Nikolai Tcherepnin, op. 41 for orchestra
- 1937 - The Tale of the Fisherman and the Fish, USSR, animated film by Aleksandr Ptushko.
- 1950 - The Tale of the Fisherman and the Fish, USSR, classic traditionally animated film by Mikhail Tsekhanovsky.,
- 2002 - About the Fisherman and the Goldfish, Russia, stop-motion film by Nataliya Dabizha.
