= 1965 in animation =

Events in 1965 in animation.

== Events ==
=== January ===
- January 16: Friz Freleng and Hawley Pratt's cartoon It's Nice to Have a Mouse Around the House premieres, it is the first cartoon to have Speedy Gonzales and Daffy Duck paired up together. Sylvester & Granny both appear in the beginning of the short.
- January 20: Chuck Jones' Tom and Jerry cartoon Ah, Sweet Mouse-Story of Life premieres.
- January 27: Chuck Jones' Tom and Jerry cartoon Tom-ic Energy premieres.
- January 30: Friz Freleng and Hawley Pratt's Speedy Gonzales and Sylvester cartoon Cats and Bruises premieres, produced by DePatie–Freleng Enterprises.

=== February ===
- February 10: Chuck Jones' Tom and Jerry cartoon Bad Day at Cat Rock premieres.
- February 27: Friz Freleng and Hawley Pratt's cartoon The Wild Chase; starring Speedy Gonzales, Sylvester, Wile E. Coyote, & the Road Runner, premieres. Was produced by DePatie–Freleng Enterprises.

=== March ===
- March 3: Jim Pabian & Maurice Noble's Tom and Jerry cartoon The Brothers Carry-Mouse-Off premieres, was also produced by Chuck Jones.
- March 20: The anime film Gulliver's Travels Beyond the Moon, by Masao Kuroda and Sanae Yamamoto, premieres.
- March 24: Chuck Jones' Tom and Jerry cartoon Haunted Mouse premieres.
- March 27: Robert McKimson's Speedy Gonzales and Daffy Duck cartoon Moby Duck premieres, produced by DePatie–Freleng Enterprises.

=== April ===
- April 3: David Detiege's The Man from Button Willow premieres.
- April 5: 37th Academy Awards:
  - Mary Poppins wins the Academy Award for Best Actress (Julie Andrews), Academy Award for Best Original Score (the entire soundtrack), the Academy Award for Best Original Song ("Chim Chim Cher-ee"), the Academy Award for Best Film Editing (Cotton Warburton), and the Academy Award for Best Special Visual Effects (done by Peter Ellenshaw, Eustace Lycett and Hamilton Luske).
  - Friz Freleng, Hawley Pratt and David DePatie's The Pink Phink wins the Academy Award for Best Animated Short.
- April 7: Chuck Jones' Tom and Jerry cartoon I'm Just Wild About Jerry premieres.
- April 24: Robert McKimson's Speedy Gonzales and Daffy Duck cartoon Assault and Peppered premieres, produced by DePatie–Freleng Enterprises.

=== May ===
- May 19: Chuck Jones' Tom and Jerry cartoon Of Feline Bondage premieres.
- May 22: Robert McKimson's Speedy Gonzales and Daffy Duck cartoon Well Worn Daffy premieres, produced by DePatie–Freleng Enterprises.

=== June ===
- June 6: The first episode of Osamu Tezuka's The Amazing 3 airs.
- June 9: Chuck Jones' Tom and Jerry cartoon The Year of the Mouse premieres. The plot is similar to Jones' 1949 Looney Tunes short Mouse Wreckers.
- June 18: Robert McKimson's Daffy Duck cartoon Suppressed Duck premieres, produced by DePatie–Freleng Enterprises. This is the final Looney Tunes/Merrie Melodies short where Daffy has a solo role, as he would be paired with other characters (specifically Speedy Gonzales).
- June 23: Rankin/Bass Productions releases Willy McBean and his Magic Machine.

=== July ===
- July 24: The Merrie Melodies short Corn on the Cop, starring Daffy Duck, Porky Pig, & Granny, premieres. This was Porky & Granny's final appearances in the Golden age of American animation (though the latter would appear in the former cartoon Mucho Locos as archival footage from 1958's Robin Hood Daffy).
- July 31: The Wile E. Coyote and the Road Runner cartoon Rushing Roulette premieres, produced by DePatie–Freleng Enterprises. It was the first of the two Wile E. Coyote and Road Runner shorts to be directed by Robert McKimson.

=== August ===
- August 1: Rembrandt Films' Here's Nudnik premieres. This marks the debut of Nudnik created by Gene Deitch. It was nominated for Academy Award for Best Animated Short Film. This short garnered into a series for two years following its success.
- August 21: The Wile E. Coyote and the Road Runner cartoon Run, Run, Sweet Road Runner premieres, produced by DePatie–Freleng Enterprises. It was the first Wile E. Coyote and Road Runner short to be directed by Rudy Larriva.
- August 28: Robert McKimson's Daffy Duck and Goofy Gophers cartoon Tease for Two premieres, produced by DePatie–Freleng Enterprises. This was the Goofy Gophers' final appearance in the Golden age of American animation.

=== September ===
- September 9: The first episode of Hanna-Barbera's The Atom Ant/Secret Squirrel Show airs.
- September 11: The first episode of Roger Ramjet airs.
- September 18: Rudy Larriva's Wile E. Coyote and the Road Runner cartoon Tired and Feathered premieres, produced by DePatie–Freleng Enterprises.
- September 25: The Beatles, based on the popular British band the Beatles, debuts on ABC.
- September 30: The first episode of Thunderbirds airs.

=== October ===
- October 1:
  - The Flintstones episode "The Return of Stony Curtis" is first broadcast, guest starring Tony Curtis as Stony Curtis.
  - Bruno Bozzetto's West and Soda premieres.
- October 6: The first episode of Kimba the White Lion, based on Osamu Tezuka's manga series, airs.
- October 9:
  - Rudy Larriva's Wile E. Coyote and the Road Runner cartoon Boulder Wham! premieres, produced by DePatie–Freleng Enterprises.
  - The first episode of Milton the Monster airs.
- October 22: The Flintstones episode Samantha is first broadcast, guest starring Elizabeth Montgomery and Dick York playing their characters from Bewitched.
- October 23:
  - Robert McKimson's Speedy Gonzales and Daffy Duck cartoon Chili Corn Corny premieres, produced by DePatie–Freleng Enterprises.
  - The Underdog episode "The Flying Sorcerers, Part 3" airs, which marks one of the known episodes where Sweet Polly Purebred gets abused.
- October 30: Rudy Larriva's Wile E. Coyote and Road Runner cartoon Just Plane Beep premieres, produced by DePatie–Freleng Enterprises.

=== November ===
- November 13: Rudy Larriva's Wile E. Coyote and Road Runner cartoon Hairied and Hurried premieres, produced by DePatie–Freleng Enterprises.
- November 20: Robert McKimson's Speedy Gonzales and Daffy Duck cartoon Go Go Amigo premieres, produced by DePatie–Freleng Enterprises.

=== December ===
- December 9: A Charlie Brown Christmas, the first Peanuts animated special, airs on CBS. This Christmas special will become a legendary holiday classic.
- December 11: Rudy Larriva's Wile E. Coyote and Road Runner cartoon Highway Runnery premieres, produced by DePatie–Freleng Enterprises.
- December 22: Chuck Jones' Tom and Jerry cartoon The Cat's Me-Ouch! premieres.
- December 25: Rudy Larriva's Wile E. Coyote and Road Runner cartoon Chaser on the Rocks premieres, produced by DePatie–Freleng Enterprises.
- December 31: Chuck Jones' The Dot and the Line produced by MGM Animation/Visual Arts, is released.

=== Specific date unknown ===
- Belvision releases the film Les Aventures des Schtroumpfs, directed by Eddy Ryssack, based on Peyo's The Smurfs. The picture is an anthology film of five earlier Smurfs shorts.
- The first episode of Pojďte pane, budeme si hrát, aka Hey Mister, Let's Play! airs.
- Arthur Lipsett's A Trip Down Memory Lane premieres.
- Gene Deitch's Nudnik debuts in the animated short Here's Nudnik.

== Films released ==
- January 1 - Shounen Ninja Kaze no Fujimaru: Dai Saru Taiji (Japan)
- January 3 - Treasure Island Revisited (Japan)
- March 20:
  - Gulliver's Travels Beyond the Moon (Japan)
  - Shounen Ninja Kaze no Fujimaru: Ma Boroshi Majutsu-dan (Japan)
- April 3 - The Man from Button Willow (United States)
- June 23 - Willy McBean and His Magic Machine (United States, Canada and Japan)
- October 1 - West and Soda (Italy)
- November 23:
  - Donald Duck Goes West (United States)
- December 22 - Pinocchio in Outer Space (Belgium and United States)
- Specific date unknown:
  - Les Aventures des Schtroumpfs (Belgium)
  - The Edgar Bergen & Charlie McCarthy Show (United States and Japan)

== Television series ==
- January 7 - Super Jetter Mirai Kawa Kita Shonen debuts on TV Tokyo.
- February 1 - Uchû Patrol Hoppa debuts on NET (now TV Asahi).
- April 2 - Perman debuts on TBS.
- April 4 - Dolphin Ôji debuts on Fuji TV.
- April 8 - Uchûjin Pipi debuts on NHK.
- May 4 - Uchû Shônen Soran debuts on Fuji TV.
- May 8 - Space Ace debuts on Fuji TV.
- June 3 - Prince Planet debuts on FNS (Fuji TV).
- June 6 - The Amazing 3 debuts on Fuji TV.
- July 29 - The Pogles debuts on BBC.
- August 23 - The Astronut Show debuts on CBS.
- August 29 - Obake no Q-tarō debuts on TBS.
- September 9 - The Atom Ant/Secret Squirrel Show debuts on NBC.
- September 11 - Sinbad Jr. and his Magic Belt debuts in syndication.
- September 25 - The Beatles debuts on ABC, Australian Broadcasting Corporation, and ITV.
- October (specific date unknown) - The New 3 Stooges debuts in syndication.
- October 2 - Atom Ant, Precious Pupp, Secret Squirrel, Squiddly Diddly, The Hillbilly Bears, and Winsome Witch debut on NBC.
- October 6 - Kimba the White Lion debuts on Fuji TV.
- October 9 - Milton the Monster debuts on ABC.
- October 23 - Roger Ramjet debuts in syndication.
- November 1 - Hustle Punch debuts on TV Asahi.
- December 14 - Tatakae! Osper debuts on NTV.
- Specific date unknown:
  - Captain Fathom, DoDo, The Kid from Outer Space, and JOT (TV series) debut in syndication.

== Births ==
=== January ===
- January 7: John Ondrasik, American singer-songwriter and pianist (voice of Captain Hero's Father in the Drawn Together episode "Little Orphan Hero").
- January 10: Butch Hartman, American animator (An American Tail, Ruby-Spears Enterprises, CatDog), storyboard artist (Hanna-Barbera, Disney Television Animation, Jumanji, Annabelle's Wish, The New Woody Woodpecker Show), writer (Johnny Bravo, The Adventures of Jimmy Neutron, Boy Genius), director (Johnny Bravo) and producer (creator of The Fairly OddParents, Danny Phantom, T.U.F.F. Puppy, Bunsen Is a Beast, and HobbyKids Adventures).
- January 11: Seiji Sasaki, Japanese actor (voice of Blueno in One Piece, Recoome in Dragon Ball, Japanese dub voice of J'onn J'onzz in Justice League and Jonathan Kent and Metallo in Superman: The Animated Series).
- January 12: Rob Zombie, American musician, songwriter, filmmaker (The Haunted World of El Superbeasto) and actor (voice of the Lizard in the Spider-Man: The New Animated Series episode "Law of the Jungle", Ichthultu in the Justice League episode "The Terror Beyond", Ordutheus in the Mr. Pickles episode "Vegans").
- January 13: Paul Greenberg, Canadian-American voice actor (voice of Prissypeo in Thumb Wars: The Phantom Cuticle, various characters in Yo-kai Watch, Yolkian Guard in Jimmy Neutron: Boy Genius, Brobot and Ooblar in The Adventures of Jimmy Neutron, Boy Genius, Brett in The Ant Bully, Mr. Bump and Mr. Quiet in The Mr. Men Show, Aubrey in Back at the Barnyard, Edgar Allan Poe in the Time Squad episode "Every Poe Has a Silver Lining", Barno in The Wild Thornberrys episode "Bad Company", Naked Mole Rat Expert in the As Told by Ginger episode "Family Therapy") and screenwriter (As Told by Ginger, Yakkity Yak, Rugrats Go Wild, Yvon of the Yukon, Tupu, Jibber Jabber, Kung Fu Dino Posse).
- January 18: Dan Russell, English voice actor (Richard Watterson, Patrick Fitzgerald and others in The Amazing World of Gumball).
- January 22: Diane Lane, American actress (voice of Riley's Mom in the Inside Out franchise).
- January 24: Carlos Saldanha, Brazilian animator, director, producer, and voice actor (Blue Sky Studios).
- January 25: Esther Roord, Dutch actress (Dutch dub voice of Joan Rivers in Shrek 2), (d. 2026).
- January 27: Alan Cumming, Scottish actor (voice of the Devil in God, the Devil and Bob, Adolf Hitler and Braveheart in Jackboots on Whitehall, Gutsy Smurf in The Smurfs, The Smurfs: The Legend of Smurfy Hollow and The Smurfs 2, Bog King in Strange Magic, Generalissimo Meriweather in Michael Jackson's Halloween, Owen in The Prince, John Castaway in the Gargoyles episode "The Journey", Rumpledkiltskin in the Courage the Cowardly Dog episode "Rumpledkiltskin", the White Rabbit in the Dora the Explorer episode "Dora in Wonderland", Sebastian Winkeplotz in the Arthur episode "Show Off", Loki in The Simpsons episode "Bart's in Jail!").
- January 31: Dylan Beach, American former child actor (voice of Charlie Brown in It's Arbor Day, Charlie Brown), (d. 2008).

=== February ===
- February 7: Chris Rock, American comedian, actor, and filmmaker (voice of the title character in Osmosis Jones, Marty in the Madagascar franchise, Mooseblood in Bee Movie).
- February 9: Keith Wickham, English actor (voice of Professor Inkling in Octonauts, Bungo in Jungle Junction, Frank in The Koala Brothers).
- February 12: David J. Steinberg, American actor (portrayed the SpongeBob Hallucination in the live-action segment of the SpongeBob SquarePants episode "Atlantis SquarePantis"), (d. 2010).
- February 21: Emily Michels, American animator (The Simpsons, The Ren & Stimpy Show, Hey Arnold!), storyboard artist (Little Dracula), character designer (Little Dracula, The Addams Family, Madeline) and prop designer (Madeline).
- February 23: Vincent Chalvon-Demersay, French producer (co-creator of Totally Spies!).

=== March ===
- March 8: Satoru Akahori, Japanese screenwriter (Tekkaman Blade, Video Girl Ai).
- March 9: Mike Pollock, American voice actor and radio personality (voice of Doctor Eggman in Sonic X and Sonic Boom).
- March 11:
  - Wallace Langham, American actor (voice of Andy French in Mission Hill, Anarky in Beware the Batman, Sven in The Wild Thornberrys episode "Pal Joey", Prince Bobby in the Happily Ever After: Fairy Tales for Every Child episode "The Frog Princess", Basil Karlo / Clayface in The Batman episode "Clayfaces", Ocean Master in the Batman: The Brave and the Bold episode "Evil Under the Sea!", Tyler in the Ben 10: Alien Force episode "Inside Man").
  - Andy Sturmer, American musician and composer (Warner Bros. Animation, Disney Television Animation, performed the second theme of The Batman).
- March 13: Cees Geel, Dutch actor (Dutch dub voice of Russ Cargill in The Simpsons Movie, Lord Garmadon in The Lego Ninjago Movie), (d. 2026).
- March 16: Masaaki Yuasa, Japanese director (Lu over the Wall, Devilman crybaby), screenwriter, and animator; co-founder of Science Saru.
- March 18:
  - Yul Vazquez, Cuban-American actor and musician (voice of Gibson Mouse in The Adventures of Tom Thumb and Thumbelina, additional voices in Courage the Cowardly Dog).
  - Joe Suggs, American animator (A Wish for Wings That Work, Taz-Mania, The Swan Princess, The Critic, What a Cartoon!, Timon & Pumbaa, Space Ghost Coast to Coast, The King and I, Futurama, The Oblongs), storyboard artist (Rocko's Modern Life, Rugrats, 2 Stupid Dogs, Space Jam, 101 Dalmatians: The Series, The Lionhearts, Futurama, Dilbert, Grandma Got Run Over by a Reindeer) and writer (Rocko's Modern Life).
- March 19: Jeff Pidgeon, American animator (The Butter Battle Book, Tiny Toon Adventures, The Simpsons, Taz-Mania), character designer (Bakshi Animation, FernGully: The Last Rainforest), storyboard artist, screenwriter and voice actor (Pixar).
- March 21: Wakana Yamazaki, Japanese voice actress (voice of Noriko in One Piece, Ran Mouri in Case Closed), (d. 2026).
- March 23: Richard Grieco, American actor (voice of Tony Dracon in Gargoyles, Ghost Rider in Fantastic Four and The Incredible Hulk).
- March 24:
  - Mark Calaway, American pro wrestler (voiced himself in The Flintstones & WWE: Stone Age SmackDown!, Scooby-Doo! and WWE: Curse of the Speed Demon, Surf's Up 2: WaveMania).
  - Peter Jacobson, American actor (voice of Acer in Cars 2, Waterkotte in Prep & Landing).
  - Elisabetta Spinelli, Italian voice actress (Italian dub voice of the title character in Sailor Moon, Chi-Chi in the Dragon Ball franchise, Winry Rockbell in Fullmetal Alchemist).
- March 27: Eric Horsted, American television writer (Futurama, Fanboy & Chum Chum, The Simpsons, Disenchantment).
- March 30: Juliet Landau, American actress (voice of Verdona, Helen Wheels, and Natalie Tennyson in the Ben 10 franchise, Drusa in Green Lantern: The Animated Series, Tala in Justice League Unlimited).
- March 31: Steven T. Seagle, American comic book writer, producer (Man of Action Entertainment, Marvel Animation, Zagtoon, Mega Man: Fully Charged), and voice actor (voice of Orangutank and Ice Crusher in Power Players).

=== April ===
- April 12: Konstantin Bronzit, Russian director and animator (Lavatory – Lovestory, We Can't Live Without Cosmos).
- April 16:
  - Jon Cryer, American actor (voice of Felix Faust in Justice League Action, Freakshow in Danny Phantom, Clifton and Dave in Stripperella, Joel Stein in Hey Joel, Winged Wolves in the Hercules episode "Hercules and the Underworld Takeover", Brainy Smurf in the Robot Chicken episode "Your Mouth Is Hanging off Your Face").
  - Sean Maher, American actor (voice of Nightwing in the DC Animated Movie Universe and Teen Titans Go! vs. Teen Titans).
- April 20:
  - Evan Dorkin, American comic book artist, cartoonist and television writer (Space Ghost Coast to Coast, Superman: The Animated Series, Batman Beyond, Crayon Shin-chan, Ben 10, creator of Welcome to Eltingville).
  - Magnus Carlsson, Swedish illustrator, cartoonist, director and animator.
- April 25: Sam Semon, American studio executive (CBS, Gaumont Television, NBCUniversal, Amazon MGM Studios), (d. 2026).
- April 26: Kevin James, American actor, comedian and screenwriter (voice of Officer Landers in Monster House, Otis in Barnyard, Frankenstein in the Hotel Transylvania franchise).
- April 30: Adrian Pasdar, American actor (voice of Iron Man in Avengers Assemble, Ultimate Spider-Man, Hulk and the Agents of S.M.A.S.H., and the Phineas and Ferb episode "Phineas and Ferb: Mission Marvel", Hawkeye in The Super Hero Squad Show, Micronus Prime in Transformers: Robots in Disguise, Mr. Chase in Milo Murphy's Law).

=== May ===
- May 8:
  - Monique Beatty, American television producer (DreamWorks Animation Television, Nickelodeon Animation Studio, Project G.e.e.K.e.R., Extreme Ghostbusters, Toonsylvania, Mike, Lu & Og, Stripperella).
  - Glen Wuthrich, American animator (The Simpsons) and background artist (Edith Ann: Homeless Go Home, King of the Hill, The Simpsons).
- May 10: Kiyoyuki Yanada, Japanese voice actor (voice of Andromon in the Digimon franchise, Takenori Akagi in Slam Dunk, Kage-Maru in Virtua Fighter, Andre Camel in Case Closed) and animation director (Perfect Blue), (d. 2022).
- May 16: Christopher Ayres, American actor and ADR director (Funimation), (d. 2021).
- May 18: Teddy Castellucci, American film composer (Eight Crazy Nights).
- May 19: Maile Flanagan, American actress and comedian (voice of Naruto in the Naruto franchise, Piggley Winks in Jakers! The Adventures of Piggley Winks, JR Elephant in Pig Goat Banana Cricket, Lucky in Rango, Macy in Back at the Barnyard).
- May 20: Dan Yaccarino, American author, illustrator and producer (creator of Oswald and Doug Unplugs).
- May 23:
  - Kappei Yamaguchi, Japanese actor (voice of the title character in Ranma ½, Jimmy Kudo in Case Closed, Jin in YuYu Hakusho, Usopp in One Piece, Teddie in Persona 4: The Animation, Flappy in Futari wa Pretty Cure Splash Star).
  - Marcello Magni, Italian actor (continued voice of the title character and other various characters in Pingu), (d. 2022).
- May 24:
  - John C. Reilly, American actor (voice of Ralph in the Wreck-It Ralph franchise, Eddie in Sing, 5 in 9, Kiyomasa Oiwa in When Marnie Was There).
  - Shinichiro Watanabe, Japanese animation director (Cowboy Bebop, Samurai Champloo).
- May 27: Zenobia Shroff, Indian–American actress and comedienne (voice of Counselor Jerry in Soul).
- May 28: Alon Abutbul, Israeli actor (voice of Morando in 3Below: Tales of Arcadia), (d. 2025).
- May 30: Iginio Straffi, Italian animator (Winx Club, Huntik: Secrets & Seekers).
- May 31: Brooke Shields, American actress and model (voice of Miss Spider in Miss Spider's Sunny Patch Kids, Carol Ferris in Justice League: The New Frontier, Ruby Bear in The Goldilocks and the 3 Bears Show, Mrs. Goodman in Mr. Pickles and Momma Named Me Sheriff, Seraphina in Creative Galaxy, Julie in The Batman episode "Riddler's Revenge", Witch in the Wonder Pets! episode "In the Land of Oz", herself in The Simpsons episode "The Front").

=== June ===
- June 5: Tyler Bates, American musician, producer and composer (Cartoon Network Studios, The Haunted World of El Superbeasto).
- June 6: Megumi Ogata, Japanese actress, voice actress, and singer (voice of Shinji Ikari in Neon Genesis Evangelion, Yugi Mutou in Yu-Gi-Oh!, Makoto Naegi and Nagito Komaeda in Danganronpa, Kurama in YuYu Hakusho, Sailor Uranus in Sailor Moon, Hanako and Tsukasa in Toilet-Bound Hanako-kun, Yukito Tsukishiro and Yue in Cardcaptor Sakura, Yuta Okkotsu in Jujutsu Kaisen 0).
- June 7: Mick Foley, American former professional wrestler (voice of himself in Celebrity Deathmatch, The Boulder in Avatar: The Last Airbender, Thunderclap in the Squidbillies episode "Anabolic-holic", Glorft Leader in the What a Cartoon! episode "LowBrow: Test Drive").
- June 8:
  - Kevin Farley, American actor, comedian, writer, producer and director (voice of Panda Express Panda in Eight Crazy Nights, Henchman #1 in Stripperella, Babe Bonfiglio, Carl, Patient, Gene and Dick Sawitzki in F Is for Family).
  - Frank Grillo, American actor (voice of Rick Flag in Creature Commandos, Agent Faraday in Justice League: Warworld, Crossbones in What If...?).
- June 19:
  - Greg Tiernan, Canadian-Irish animator and film and television director (Nitrogen Studios).
  - Sean Marshall, American former actor and singer (portrayed Pete in Pete's Dragon, voice of the Boy in The Small One).
- June 23: Andy Houts, American actor (voice of McGrew, Bucky, Oodles, Wuggles in Rugrats, Snill and Butch in AAAHH!!! Real Monsters), animator (Aaahh!!! Real Monsters, Duckman), and writer (Rugrats) (d. 1997)
- June 26: Bobs Gannaway, American screenwriter (2 Stupid Dogs, Cats Don't Dance), producer and director (Disney Television Animation, Disneytoon Studios).
- June 28: Sonny Strait, American actor (voice of Krillin in Dragon Ball, Maes Hughes in Fullmetal Alchemist, Koro-sensei in Assassination Classroom, Present Mic in My Hero Academia, original voice of TOM in Toonami).
- June 30: Brian Medavoy, American producer (Alpha and Omega, My Little Pony: The Movie).

=== July ===
- July 7: Mo Collins, American actress and comedian (voice of Zita in Invader Zim, Midge in Life's a B****, Jimbo Jones in The Simpsons, Bolts in Iron Man and His Awesome Friends, Jan 2.0 in Puppy Dog Pals, Jojo in Close Enough, various characters in Family Guy)
- July 8: Nick Jennings, American animator, background artist (Nickelodeon Animation Studio, The Brave Little Toaster to the Rescue, The Brave Little Toaster Goes to Mars, Oh Yeah! Cartoons, Cartoon Network Studios), art director (Rocko's Modern Life, SpongeBob SquarePants, Adventure Time), writer (Rocko's Modern Life), director and producer (Tak and the Power of Juju, Adventure Time, The Powerpuff Girls).
- July 14: Juli Hashiguchi, American animator (Rugrats, Cool World, The Thief and the Cobbler), storyboard artist (Rugrats), sheet timer (Klasky Csupo, Film Roman, Nickelodeon Animation Studio, Happily Ever After: Fairy Tales for Every Child, Family Guy, Dragon Tales, Disney Television Animation, What's New, Scooby-Doo?, Cartoon Network Studios, Curious George, American Dad!, Napoleon Dynamite, Full English, NFL Rush Zone, Dawn of the Croods, Guardians of the Galaxy, Big Mouth, Paradise PD, The Great North, HouseBroken) and director (The Mask: Animated Series, The Story of Santa Claus, Nickelodeon Animation Studio, Cartoon Network Studios).
- July 19: Robert Smith, Canadian actor (voice of Spot in Rolie Polie Olie, Coach Rhineheart in Angela Anaconda, Goliath in Jojo's Circus, Holley in Miss Spider's Sunny Patch Friends, Trevor Potanski in Bad Dog), (d. 2020).
- July 22: Patrick Labyorteaux, American actor (voice of Flash Thompson in Spider-Man, Dr. Hoffman in the Godzilla: The Series episode "Monster Wars").
- July 23: Allison Abbate, American film producer and animator (Walt Disney Animation Studios, Warner Bros. Animation).
- July 24: Kadeem Hardison, American actor (voice of Adam Evans / Rubberband Man in Static Shock, Clown in the Happily Ever After: Fairy Tales for Every Child episode "The Steadfast Tin Soldier", Goki in the Captain Planet and the Planeteers episode "Gorillas Will Be Missed").
- July 26: Jeremy Piven, American actor (voice of Rock Rivers in Scooby-Doo! in Where's My Mummy?, Harv in Cars, Black Bellamy in The Pirates! In an Adventure with Scientists!, Elongated Man in Justice League Unlimited, Roland Gaines in the Spider-Man: The New Animated Series episode "Mind Games", Brain Pod #57 in the Buzz Lightyear of Star Command episode "Star Crossed").
- July 30: Greg Kibler, American telecine colorist (Universal Animation Studios, Nickelodeon Animation Studio, Hoops & Yoyo Ruin Christmas).

=== August ===
- August 6: Yuki Kajiura, Japanese composer (Puella Magi Madoka Magica, Sword Art Online).
- August 7: Jon Jon Briones, Filipino-American actor (voice of Hank in Trese, Alex Malto in Transformers: EarthSpark).
- August 10
  - Claudia Christian, American actress, singer and author (voice of Helga Sinclair in Atlantis: The Lost Empire, Queen Aquareine in The Oz Kids, Hera in Blood of Zeus, Susan Ivanova in Babylon 5: The Road Home).
  - Kulvinder Ghir, British actor and comedian (voice of Bill Thompson in Postman Pat, Anish Bose in Bob the Builder, Sanjay in The Queen's Corgi).
- August 11: Viola Davis, American actress (voice of Amanda Waller in Creature Commandos, Helen Hanshaw in the Sofia the First episode "The Buttercups", The Chameleon in Kung Fu Panda 4).
- August 18: Ikue Ōtani, Japanese voice actress and singer (voice of Pikachu in the Pokémon franchise, Obiru in Flint the Time Detective, Tony Tony Chopper in One Piece, Koryu in Inuyasha, the title character in Zatch Bell!, Oshare in Hamtaro, Sora Hasegawa in Oh My Goddess!, Konohamaru Sarutobi in Naruto: Shippuden, Terara in Sgt. Frog, Candy in Smile PreCure!, Morgana in Persona 5: The Animation, Yokai Kozo in Dororo, dub voice of Dot Warner in Animaniacs, Chomper in The Land Before Time, Apple Bloom in My Little Pony: Friendship Is Magic, Dennis in the Hotel Transylvania franchise, and Little My in Moominvalley).
- August 19: Kyra Sedgwick, American actress (voice of Batwoman in Batman: Mystery of the Batwoman, Lois Lane in Justice League: The New Frontier).
- August 20: Tom Yasumi, Japanese-born American animator (The Legend of Prince Valiant), character designer, background artist (Rugrats), sheet timer (Nickelodeon Animation Studio, Clarence, Animaniacs, The Great North, Central Park) and director (Nickelodeon Animation Studio).
- August 21: Sean Gallimore, American animator (Thumbelina, A Troll in Central Park, The Pagemaster, Walt Disney Animation Studios, Looney Tunes: Back in Action, Space Jam: A New Legacy), (d. 2021).
- August 26: Nancy Kruse, American animator (The Critic, Walt Disney Animation Studios), writer (Get a Horse!, Encanto) and director (The Simpsons).
- August 28: Satoshi Tajiri, Japanese video game designer and director (creator of Pokémon, co-founder of Game Freak).
- August 29: Seán Cullen, Canadian actor and comedian (voice of Mayor Shelbourne and Tim Lockwood in Cloudy with a Chance of Meatballs, Piggy and Narwhal in Almost Naked Animals, Principal Barrage in Detentionaire, Fartor in Grossology, Four, Five, and Seven in Seven Little Monsters, Hydronormous in Atomic Puppet, Emperor Brainlius in Oh No! It's an Alien Invasion).
- August 30: Benoît di Sabatino, French animation producer (co-founder of MoonScoop).

=== September ===
- September 7: Hiroki Takahashi, Japanese actor (voice of Eiji Kikumaru in The Prince of Tennis, Hisoka in Hunter × Hunter, Katsuya Jonouchi in Yu-Gi-Oh! Duel Monsters, Japan in Hetalia: Axis Powers, Pisard in Futari wa Pretty Cure, Tobias in Pokémon).
- September 9: Constance Marie, American actress (voice of Imelda in Puss in Boots, Dona Paloma in Elena of Avalor).
- September 13: Jeff Ross, American comedian and actor (voice of Hook Foot in Rapunzel's Tangled Adventure, himself in The Simpsons episode "Clown in the Dumps" and the Batman: The Brave and the Bold episode "Crisis: 22,300 Miles Above Earth!").
- September 14: Shawn Patterson, American songwriter (wrote the song "Everything Is Awesome" for The Lego Movie) and composer (Nickelodeon Animation Studio, Project G.e.e.K.e.R., Dave the Barbarian, Titan Maximum, Robot Chicken, Mad, The High Fructose Adventures of Annoying Orange, The Adventures of Puss in Boots).
- September 17: Kyle Chandler, American actor (voice of Tucker Mardell in the King of the Hill episode "The Courtship of Joseph's Father", Coach Keegan in the American Dad! episode "Introducing the Naughty Stewardesses", Coach Doyle in the Family Guy episode "Bookie of the Year").
- September 21: David Wenham, Australian actor (voice of Jacko in Blinky Bill the Movie, Digger in Legend of the Guardians: The Owls of Ga'Hoole, Johnny Town-Mouse Peter Rabbit and Peter Rabbit 2: The Runaway).
- September 25: Saffron Henderson, Canadian voice actress, and singer (voice of Lucrezia Noin in Mobile Suit Gundam Wing, Sōta Higurashi in Inuyasha, Gohan in Dragon Ball Z, Sachiko Yagami in Death Note, Shenua in Black Lagoon).
- September 28: Scott Fellows, American television writer and producer (Nickelodeon Animation Studio, The Adventures of Rocky and Bullwinkle, creator of Johnny Test and Supernoobs).

=== October ===
- October 7: Andy Luckey, American animator, artist, author, designer, director, illustrator and television producer (Teenage Mutant Ninja Turtles, Adventures from the Book of Virtues).
- October 8: C. J. Ramone, American musician and member of the Ramones (voiced himself in The Simpsons episode "Rosebud").
- October 11: Frank Fritz, American antique picker and reality television host (voice of himself in the American Dad! episode "Family Plan"), (d. 2024).
- October 13: Bill Odenkirk, American television writer and producer (Futurama, The Simpsons, Disenchantment).
- October 14: Steve Coogan, English actor and comedian (voice of Silas Ramsbottom in the Despicable Me franchise, Rowan Piddis in The Simpsons episode "A Totally Fun Thing That Bart Will Never Do Again").
- October 18: Ralph Eggleston, American animator (Family Dog, Garfield: His 9 Lives, Computer Warriors, FernGully: The Last Rainforest), storyboard artist (The Simpsons), art director (FernGully: The Last Rainforest, Walt Disney Animation Studios), production designer, writer and film director (Pixar), (d. 2022).
- October 22: Alejandro Fried, Uruguayan-Argentine animator and comic artist (worked for Ruby-Spears and Hanna-Barbera), (d. 2024).
- October 30: Dominique Jennings, American actress (voice of Wanda Blake in Todd McFarlane's Spawn, Ellie in The Ice Age Adventures of Buck Wild, first voice of Agent Rush in The Zeta Project).
- October 31: Rob Rackstraw, English actor (voice of Kwazii in Octonauts, Buster in The Koala Brothers, Mr. Gruber in The Amazing World of Gumball, Chuckie Chan in Chop Socky Chooks, King Axalotyl and Princess Syllabob in The Heroic Quest of the Valiant Prince Ivandoe).

=== November ===
- November 7: Mike Henry, American actor (original voice of Cleveland Brown in Family Guy and The Cleveland Show).
- November 10: Sean Hughes, British-born Irish comedian, writer and actor. (voice of Finbar the great Mighty Shark in Rubbadubbers), (d. 2017).
- November 12: Lex Lang, American actor (voice of Goemon Ishikawa XIII in Lupin the Third, Sagara Sanosuke in Ruroni Kenshin, Goku in Dragon Ball Super, Jagged Stone in Miraculous: Tales of Ladybug & Cat Noir, Doctor Doom in The Avengers: Earth's Mightiest Heroes, Clayface, Metallo, and Hamilton Hill in The Batman episode "The Batman/Superman Story").
- November 20: Mike Diamond, American musician and member of the Beastie Boys (voiced himself in the Futurama episode "Hell Is Other Robots").
- November 21: Magnus Fiennes, English songwriter, record producer and composer (Casper's Scare School, Freefonix).
- November 22:
  - Sam Fell, British animator, director, screenwriter, and voice actor (Flushed Away, The Tale of Despereaux, ParaNorman).
  - Sen Dog, Cuban-American rapper, musician and member of Cypress Hill (voiced himself in The Simpsons episode "Homerpalooza").
- November 24:
  - Brian K. Roberts, American television director, writer and editor (The Simpsons).
  - Run Wrake, British animator and film director (Rabbit), (d. 2012).
  - Shirley Henderson, Scottish actress (voice of the title character in The Gruffalo's Child, the Fairy Entity in the Hilda episode "Chapter 8: The Fairy Isle", Roo in the Kiff episode "Mushroommates", Mum in the Summer Camp Island episode "The Metaphysical Reverse", OOOOO in Elio).
- November 26: Scott Adsit, American actor (voice of Clay Puppington in Moral Orel, Baymax in the Big Hero 6 franchise, and Once Upon a Studio).
- November 30: Ben Stiller, American actor and comedian (voice of Alex in the Madagascar franchise, Bernard in Megamind, Harry Medfly in Duckman, Thomas Jefferson in Liberty's Kids, Khaka Peü Peü in the Phineas and Ferb episode "The Beak", Garth Motherloving in The Simpsons episode "Sweets and Sour Marge", Rich in the King of the Hill episode "That's What She Said", himself in the Space Ghost Coast to Coast episode "Rio Ghosto", the Family Guy episode "No Meals on Wheels", and the Dr. Katz, Professional Therapist episode "Ticket").

=== December ===
- December 3:
  - Andrew Stanton, American animator, storyboard artist (2 Stupid Dogs, Timon & Pumbaa), film director, screenwriter (Mighty Mouse: The New Adventures), producer and voice actor (Pixar).
  - Steve Harris, American actor (voice of Ethan Bennett / Clayface in The Batman, Makai in The Wild Thornberrys episode "Critics Masai", Sports Coach Hero in the Higglytown Heroes episode "Havin' a Ball").
- December 4: Veronica Taylor, American voice actress (voice of Ash Ketchum, Delia Ketchum, and May in seasons 1-8 of Pokémon, Amelia in Slayers, Brianne de Chateau/Ribrianne in Dragon Ball Super, Max Talor in Dinosaur King, Nico Robin in the 4Kids dub of One Piece, Setsuna Meioh / Sailor Pluto in the Viz Media dub of Sailor Moon, April O'Neil in Teenage Mutant Ninja Turtles, Sheep in WordWorld).
- December 5:
  - John Rzeznik, American musician and member of the Goo Goo Dolls (composed and performed the songs "I'm Still Here" and "Always Know Where You Are" from Treasure Planet).
  - Tsutomu Mizushima, Japanese animator and sound director.
- December 7: Jeffrey Wright, American actor (voice of Uatu the Watcher in What If...?, Grizzly Judge in Ernest & Celestine, Poppa Henry in The Good Dinosaur, Cuddlywhiskers in BoJack Horseman, Mc Winkle in Green Eggs and Ham, Think Tank in The Venture Bros. episode "Tanks for Nuthin", Tony in the Rick and Morty episode "The Old Man and the Seat").
- December 10: Stephanie Morgenstern, Canadian actress, filmmaker, and screenwriter (voice of Sailor Venus in the original English dub of Sailor Moon, Yin in Yin Yang Yo!, Regina in Dino Crisis).
- December 16: J. B. Smoove, American actor and comedian (voice of Bebop in Teenage Mutant Ninja Turtles, Phil in 3Below: Tales of Arcadia, Frank in Harley Quinn, Black Manta in Teen Titans Go!, DJ Kwanzaa in The Simpsons episode "Angry Dad: The Movie", B. A. Baracus and Satan in the Robot Chicken episode "Crushed by a Steamroller on My 53rd Birthday").
- December 17: Jessica Gee-George, American actress (voice of Holbrook in Little Witch Academia, Petz in Sailor Moon, Mylène Haprèle and Daizzi in Miraculous: Tales of Ladybug & Cat Noir, Sassafras in Zak Storm).
- December 21: Andy Dick, American actor and comedian (voice of Mr. Sheepman in Clone High, Nuka in The Lion King franchise, Slim in the Batman Beyond episode "The Eggbaby", Monkeyman in the Hey Arnold! episode "Monkeyman!", Jerry Driscoll in the Randy Cunningham: 9th Grade Ninja episode "Dawn of the Driscoll").
- December 22: Jonathan Joss, American actor (voice of Pow Wow Smith in the Justice League Unlimited episode "The Once and Future Thing Part One: Weird Western Tales", Ooloopie/Mean Polar Bears in The Wild Thornberrys episode "Polar Opposites", continued voice of John Redcorn in King of the Hill, provided additional voices for Pocahontas II: Journey to a New World), (d. 2025).
- December 23: Martin Kratt, American zoologist and television producer (created and voiced himself in Wild Kratts).
- December 25:
  - Susie Dietter, American animator (Rugrats, Rocko's Modern Life, Looney Tunes), storyboard artist (Recess, Open Season, Duck Duck Goose, Ella Bella Bingo, Bless the Harts, Rumble, Beavis and Butt-Head Do the Universe) and director (The Simpsons, The Critic, Recess, Futurama, Baby Blues, Brickleberry).
  - Anna Dewdney, American author and illustrator (creator of Llama Llama), (d. 2016).

=== Specific date unknown ===
- Bob Anderson, American director (The Simpsons).
- Jim Reardon, American animator, storyboard artist (Mighty Mouse: The New Adventures, The Butter Battle Book), writer (Mighty Mouse: The New Adventures, Tiny Toon Adventures, WALL-E, Walt Disney Animation Studios) and director (Bring Me the Head of Charlie Brown, The Simpsons).
- Chip Wass, American animator, graphic designer and illustrator (designed the Nicktoons Network logo, provided graphic design for Shorty McShorts' Shorts).
- Isabelle de Catalogne, French television writer (Space Goofs, Fly Tales, Fish 'n' Chips).
- Gianluigi Toccafondo, Italian animator (Le criminel, La pista del maiale, Pinocchio, Little Russia, animated the Scott Free logo).
- Pamela Ross, American production manager (Doug, 101 Dalmatians: The Series, The Cramp Twins) and producer (Time Warp Trio, Tutenstein), (d. 2020).
- Patty Mattson, voice actress (voice of Cheer Bear in Care Bears: Welcome to Care-a-Lot and Care Bears and Cousins).
- Jerry Richardson, American animator, storyboard artist, background artist, prop designer and art director (Bobby's World, The Simpsons, Klasky Csupo, Nickelodeon Animation Studio, Adelaide Productions, Futurama, Cartoon Network Studios, Disney Television Animation, Warner Bros. Animation, Brickleberry), (d. 2018).
- Edgar Larrazábal, American animator, storyboard artist (Hey Arnold!, Rugrats, Duncanville), sheet timer (Nickelodeon Animation Studio, Futurama, Cartoon Network Studios, DreamWorks Animation Television, Big Mouth, Disenchantment, Curious George, The Owl House, Duncanville, Chicago Party Aunt) and director (SpongeBob SquarePants).
- James Flynn, Irish producer (Disenchanted), (d. 2023).
- Michel Gagné, Canadian cartoonist (Sullivan Bluth Studios, Warner Bros., Pixar).

== Deaths ==
=== February ===
- February 19: Florence Gill, British actress (voice of Clara Cluck, and the title character in The Wise Little Hen), dies at age 87.
- February 26: Ladislas Starevich, Polish-Russian animator (The Beautiful Leukanida, The Night Before Christmas, Le Roman de Renard (The Tale of the Fox)), dies at age 82.

=== April ===
- April 22: Harvey Eisenberg, American animator and comics artist (MGM Animation, Hanna-Barbera), dies at age 53.

=== June ===
- June 22: Mikhail Tsekhanovsky, Russian animation director, illustrator, screenwriter and sculptor (Post, The Tale of the Priest and of His Workman Balda, The Tale of the Fisherman and the Fish, The Frog Princess, The Wild Swans), dies at age 76.

=== August ===
- August 6: Everett Sloane, American actor (voice of the title character in The Dick Tracy Show), commits suicide at age 55.
- August 24: Joshua Meador, American animator, film director and special effects artist (Walt Disney Studios, Forbidden Planet), dies at age 54.

=== September ===
- September 16: Fred Quimby, American animation producer and journalist (Tom and Jerry), dies at age 79.

=== October ===
- October 13: Connie Rasinski, American animator and film director (Hansel and Gretel, Terrytoons), dies at age 58.

=== December ===
- December 12: Johnny Lee, American singer, dancer and actor (voice of Br'er Rabbit in Song of the South), dies from a heart attack at age 67.

== See also ==
- 1965 in anime
