= 1965 in anime =

The events of 1965 in anime.

== Releases ==
English name	Japanese name	Type	Demographic	Regions
Gulliver's Travels Beyond the Moon	ガリバーの宇宙旅行 (Garibā no Uchū Ryokō)	Movie	Family, Children	JA
Dolphin Prince	ドルフィン王子 (Dorufin Ôji)	TV	Shōnen	JA
Pipi the Spaceman	宇宙人ピピ (Uchūjin Pipi)	TV	Children	JA
Zoran, Space Boy	宇宙少年ソラン (Uchū Shōnen Soran)	TV	Shōnen	JA
Jun the Space Patrol Hopper	宇宙パトロールホッパ (Uchū Patorōru Hopper)	TV	Shōnen	JA
Super Jetter	未来からきた少年スーパージェッター (Mirai Kara Kita Shōnen Sūpā Jettā)	TV	Shōnen	JA
New Treasure Island	新宝島 (Shin Takarajima)	TV special	Family, Children	JA
Kachi Kachi Yama	堅々獄夫婦庭訓 (Kachi Yama Meoto no Sujimichi)	Short	General	JA
The Guy Next Door	隣の野郎 (Tonari no Yarō)	Short	General	JA
The Mysterious Medicine	ふしぎなくすり (Fushigi na Kusuri)	Short	General	JA
The Window	窓 (Mado)	Short	General	JA
Space Ace	宙エース (Uchū Ēsu)	TV	Shōnen	JA
Dr. Zen	怪盗プライド (Kaitō Pride)	TV	Family, Children	JA, EU
Prince Planet	遊星少年パピイ (Yūsei Shōnen Papī)	TV	Shōnen	JA, NA
The Amazing 3	ワンダースリー (Wandā Surī)	TV	Shōnen	JA, NA
Space Boy Soran	宇宙少年ソラン (Uchū Shōnen Soran)	Movie	Shōnen	JA
Little Ghost Q-Taro	オバケのQ太郎 (Obake no Q-Tarō)	TV	Children	JA
Kimba the White Lion	ジャングル大帝 (Janguru Taitei)	TV	Shōnen	JA, NA, EU
The Drop	しずく (Shizuku)	Short	General	JA
Cigarettes and Ashes	たばこと灰 (Tabako to Hai)	Short	General	JA
Hustle Punch	ハッスルパンチ (Hassuru Panchi)	TV	Children	JA
Fight! Osper	戦え!オスパー (Tatakae! Osupā)	TV	Shōnen	JA

== Notable births ==
- May 23 - Kappei Yamaguchi, voice actor

== See also ==
- 1965 in animation
