= Roord =

Roord is a Dutch surname. Notable people with the surname include:

- Esther Roord (1965–2026), Dutch actress
- Jill Roord (born 1997), Dutch football midfielder
- Joke van der Leeuw-Roord (born 1949), Dutch historian
- René Roord (born 1964), Dutch football manager

== See also ==
- Rood (surname)
