= Rood (surname) =

Rood is a Dutch surname. Meaning "red", it often originally referred to a person with red hair. The name can also be toponymic, since in Middle Dutch "rood" or "rode" was a name for a cleared area in the woods. Among variant forms are De Rood(e), Roode, Roodt and 'Van Rood. The name can also be of English toponymic origin, referring to someone living near a rood ("cross"). Notable people with the surname include:

- Anson Rood (1827–1898), American businessman and politician from Wisconsin
- Davenport Rood (fl. 1840s), American carpenter and politician from Wisconsin
- Denise Rood (born 1955), American violinist
- E. Irene Rood (1843–1921), founder of the Chicago Audubon Society
- Grace Alexandra Rood (1893–1981), New Zealand school dental nurse
- Harold W. Rood (1922–2011), American political scientist
- John Rood (born 1968), American businessman and politician
- John D. Rood (born 1955), American businessman and diplomat
- Jon van Rood (1926–2017), Dutch immunologist
- Jurriën Rood (born 1955), Dutch screenwriter, film director and philosopher
- Katie Rood (born 1992), New Zealand football player
- Lianne Rood (born c. 1978), Canadian politician
- Mary Rood, British silversmith
- Max Rood (1927–2001), Dutch legal scholar and politician
- Ogden Rood (1831–1902), American physicist and color theorist
- Richard Rood (violinist) (born 1955), American violinist
- Richard B. Rood (born c. 1955), American climatologist
- Richard E. Rood, better known as Rick Rude (1958–1999), American wrestler
- Ronald Rood (1920–2001), American author, naturalist and radio commentator
- Theoderic Rood (fl. 1470s), English printer
- Tim Rood (born 1960s), British classical scholar

Variant spellings

- Bobby Roode (born 1977), Canadian wrestler
- Dan Roodt (born 1967), Afrikaner author, publisher, and commentator
- Darrell Roodt (born 1962), South African film director, screenwriter and producer
- Dewald Roode (1940–2009), South African computer scientist
- Hendrik Roodt (born 1987), South African rugby player

Middle names derived from the surname

- Charles Rood Keeran (1883–1948), American inventor and businessman from Illinois
- James Rood Doolittle (1815–1897), American politician from Wisconsin
- John Rood Cunningham (1891–1980), American college president
