= Special Squad =

Special Squad may refer to:

== Films and television ==
- Special Squad (Australian TV series), a 1984 Australian crime drama television series
- Special Squad (Indian TV series), a 2005–2006 Indian crime drama television series
- Special Squad (film), a 1995 Indian Malayalam film
- Colt 38 Special Squad, a 1976 Italian poliziottesco film
- Restol, The Special Rescue Squad, a 1999 Korean animated film

== Others ==
- Special Night Squads, a British-Jewish counter-insurgency unit established by Captain Orde Wingate in Palestine in 1938, during the 1936–1939 Arab revolt
- Special Demonstration Squad, an undercover unit of Greater London 's Metropolitan Police Service (MPS or the Met), set up in 1968
