= Iemasa Kayumi =

Japanese actor (1933-2014)

- 家弓 家正
- Born: October 31, 1933; Tokyo Prefecture, Empire of Japan
- Died: September 30, 2014 (aged 80); Tokyo, Japan
- Occupations: Actor; voice actor; narrator
- Years active: 1956–2014
- Agent: 81 Produce
- Height: 172 cm (5 ft 8 in)

Iemasa Kayumi (家弓 家正, Kayumi Iemasa; October 31, 1933 – September 30, 2014) was a Japanese actor, voice actor and narrator from the Tokyo Metropolitan area.

He was the official voice-over actor for Frank Sinatra and Donald Sutherland.

== Biography ==
Kayumi was born in Tokyo Prefecture and moved to Kagoshima Prefecture when he was a boy because of wartime evacuation. He entered Kagoshima Prefectural Daini-Kagoshima Middle School. Due to educational reform in occupied Japan, Daini-Kagoshima Middle School became Kagoshima Prefectural Konan High School. He studied at Kagoshima Konan High School and was in drama club. Because he came to aspire to an actor during his high school life, he went to Tokyo and learned at the acting school, Butai Geijutsu Gakuin (Theater Art College, ja:舞台芸術学院). He became an actor of shingeki and then also worked as a voice actor since 1956.

During his long career, he belonged to some troupes and affiliated with talent agencies for voice actors, for example, Aoni Production. He was finally affiliated with 81 Produce until his death at the age of 80 on September 30, 2014, while undergoing medical treatment.

Fellow voice actor and drinking companion Norio Wakamoto called him a precision machine since he never made a mistake when recording. Ayumi Fujimura cited Kayumi as an inspiration.

== Filmography ==
=== Television animation ===
1960s

- Mighty Atom (1963) (Skunk Kusai)
- Big X (1964)
- Space Ace (1965) (Dr. Tatsunoko)
- Tatakae! Osper (1965) (Chief Kaizu)
- Star of the Giants (1968)
- Yōkai Ningen Bem (1968)
- Kamui the Ninja (1969) (Fudou)

1970s

- Ashita no Joe (1970) (Henry James)
- Inakappe Taishō (1972)
- Lupin III (1972) (Kyōsuke Mamō)
- Casshan (1973) (President)
- Hurricane Polymar (1974) (Golder)
- Dog of Flanders (1975) (Hendrick Ray)
- Goliath the Super Fighter (1976) (Gordam, Narrator)
- Treasure Island (1978) (Dr. Livesey)
- Future Boy Conan (1978) (Lepka)
- Lupin III (1979) (William Hafner)

1980s

- Cat's Eye (1983)
- Jungle Emperor (1989)

1990s

- Art of Fighting (1993) (Mr. Big)
- Tekkaman Blade II (1994-1995) (General Pavlochiva)
- Master Keaton (1998) (Stuart Pitock)
- Zoids: Chaotic Century (1999) (Colonel Krueger, Narrator)
- Restol, The Special Rescue Squad (1999) (Kou)

2000s

- Kindaichi Case Files (2000) (Kenneth Goldman)
- Detective Conan (2001) (James Black)
- One Piece (2001) (Nefertari Cobra)
- Gungrave (2002) (Big Daddy)
- RahXephon (2002) (Ernst Von Bähbem)
- Petite Princess Yucie (2002) (God (King of Heaven))
- Ashita no Nadja (2003) (Old man)
- Chrono Crusade (2003) (Ricardo Hendrick)
- Zatch Bell! (2003) (Mister Goldo)
- Monster (2004) (Günther Goedelitz)
- Akagi (2005) (Boss Fujisawa)
- Immortal Grand Prix (2005) (Hans)
- Angel Heart (2005) (Doctor Sheckly)
- Pocket Monsters Diamond & Pearl (2006) (Dr. Nanakamado (Professor Rowan))
- The Third (2006) (Observer)
- Golgo 13 (2007) (Dr. Kaiser) (ep. 3)
- Fullmetal Alchemist: Brotherhood (2009) (Father, Narrator)

2010s

- Wolverine (Koh)
- Gundam Build Fighters (2013) (Team Nemesis Chairman)
- Wizard Barristers: Benmashi Cecil (2014) (Kyusaku Odagiri)

=== OVA ===
- Area 88 (1985) (McCoy-san)
- Legend of the Galactic Heroes (1989) (Joan Rebelo)
- Ruin Explorers (1995) (Rugudorull)

=== Theatrical animation ===
- Queen Millennia (1982) (Lahrmetalian)
- Nausicaä of the Valley of the Wind (1984) (Kurotowa)
- The Dagger of Kamui (1985) (Mark Twain)
- Saint Seiya: The Heated Battle of the Gods (1988) (Durbal)
- Dragon Ball Z: Broly - The Legendary Super Saiyan (1993) (Paragus)
- Tōi Umi kara Kita Coo (1993) (Captain Norbel)
- Doraemon: Nobita and Fantastic Three Musketeers (1994) (Commander Otorom)
- Ghost in the Shell (1995) (Puppet Master)
- Crayon Shin-chan: Explosion! The Hot Spring's Feel Good Final Battle (1999) (Akamamire)
- Episode of Alabasta: The Desert Princess and the Pirates (2007) (Nefertari Cobra)
- Oblivion Island: Haruka and the Magic Mirror (2009) (Baron)
- Professor Layton and the Eternal Diva (2009) (Oswald Whistler)
- Lupin the 3rd vs. Detective Conan: The Movie (2013) (James Black)
- Detective Conan: Dimensional Sniper (2014) (James Black)

=== Video games ===
Year	Title	Role	Console	Source
1996	Policenauts	Joseph Sadaoki Tokugawa	PC-9821, 3DO, PlayStation, Sega Saturn	
1998	Lunar 2: Eternal Blue Complete	Dark God Zophar	Sega CD, Sega Saturn, Sony PlayStation	
1999	Street Fighter EX2	Shadowgeist	Arcade, PlayStation (EX2 Plus only)	
2000	Mega Man Legends 2	Verner Von Bluecher	PlayStation, Microsoft Windows, PlayStation Portable	
2002	Guilty Gear X2	Slayer	Arcade, PlayStation 2	
2002	Gungrave	Big Daddy	PlayStation 2	
2011	Final Fantasy Type-0	Khalia Chival VI	PlayStation Portable	
2014	Guilty Gear Xrd -SIGN-	Slayer	Arcade, Microsoft Windows, PlayStation 3, PlayStation 4	

- Street Fighter EX series (1998–2000) (Shadowgeist)
- Guilty Gear series (2002-2014) (Slayer)
- Drakengard (2003) (Verdelet)
- Dark Sector (2008) (Yargo)
- White Knight Chronicles (2008) (Sarvain)
- Fullmetal Alchemist: To the Promised Day (2010) (Father)
- White Knight Chronicles II (2010) (Ledom)

unknown date

- Final Fantasy Type-0 HD (????) (Khalia Chival VI)

=== Television drama ===
- Shiroi Kyotō (1978) (Narrator)

=== Dubbing roles ===
==== Live-action ====
- Frank Sinatra
  - Not as a Stranger (Alfred Boone)
  - From Here to Eternity (TV edition) (Private Angelo Maggio)
  - The Man with the Golden Arm (Frankie Machine)
  - High Society (Mike Connor)
  - The Pride and the Passion (Miguel)
  - Kings Go Forth (1st Lt. Sam Loggins)
  - Some Came Running (Dave Hirsh)
  - A Hole in the Head (Tony Manetta)
  - Ocean's 11 (Danny Ocean)
  - Can-Can (François Durnais)
  - Sergeants 3 (First Sergeant Mike Merry)
  - 4 for Texas (Zack Thomas)
  - Robin and the 7 Hoods (Robbo)
  - Marriage on the Rocks (Dan Edwards)
  - Von Ryan's Express (1989 NTV edition) (Colonel Joseph L. Ryan)
  - Cast a Giant Shadow (Vince Talmadge)
  - Assault on a Queen (Mark Brittain)
  - The Naked Runner (Sam Laker)
  - Lady in Cement (Tony Rome)
  - Cannonball Run II (Frank Sinatra)
- Donald Sutherland
  - Johnny Got His Gun (Christ)
  - Lock Up (Warden Drumgoole)
  - JFK (1994 TV Asahi edition) (X)
  - Shadow of the Wolf (Henderson)
  - Disclosure (1998 TV Asahi edition) (Bob Garvin)
  - The Puppet Masters (Andrew Nivens)
  - A Time to Kill (1999 Fuji TV edition) (Lucien Wilbanks)
  - Shadow Conspiracy (Jacob Conrad)
  - The Assignment (2001 TV Asahi edition) (Jack Shaw)
  - Free Money (Judge Rolf Rausenberger)
  - Virus (Captain Robert Everton)
  - The Art of War (2003 TV Asahi/2006 TV Tokyo editions) (Douglas Thomas)
  - Panic (Michael)
  - Big Shot's Funeral (Rob Tyler)
  - Cold Mountain (2007 TV Tokyo edition) (Reverend Monroe)
  - Reign Over Me (Judge Raines)
  - Baltic Storm (Lou Aldryn)
  - The Italian Job (John Bridger)
  - Human Trafficking (TV miniseries (Agent Bill Meehan))
  - Pride & Prejudice (Mr. Bennet)
- Christopher Lee
  - Night of the Big Heat (Dr. Godfrey Hanson)
  - The Blood of Fu Manchu (Fu Manchu)
  - Scars of Dracula (Count Dracula)
  - The Satanic Rites of Dracula (Count Dracula)
  - The Lord of the Rings: The Fellowship of the Ring (Saruman the White)
  - The Lord of the Rings: The Two Towers (Saruman the White)
  - The Lord of the Rings: The Return of the King (Saruman the White)
  - Charlie and the Chocolate Factory (Dr. Wilbur Wonka)
  - Dark Shadows (Silas Clarney)
  - The Hobbit: An Unexpected Journey (Saruman the White)
- James Stewart
  - Harvey (Elwood P. Dowd)
  - The Greatest Show on Earth (1970 TV Tokyo/1973 TBS editions) (Buttons the Clown)
  - Thunder Bay (Steve Martin)
  - The Man from Laramie (Will Lockhart)
  - The FBI Story (John Michael "Chip" Hardesty)
  - The Man Who Shot Liberty Valance (Ransom "Ranse" Stoddard)
  - Mr. Hobbs Takes a Vacation (Roger Hobbs)
  - The Flight of the Phoenix (1976 Fuji TV edition) (Capt. Frank Towns)
  - The Rare Breed (Sam Burnett)
- Ian McKellen
  - X-Men (2003 TV Asahi edition) (Magneto)
  - X2 (2006 TV Asahi edition) (Magneto)
  - X-Men: The Last Stand (2009 TV Asahi edition) (Magneto)
  - The Wolverine (Magneto)
  - X-Men: Days of Future Past (Magneto)
- 2010 (1990 TBS edition) (Heywood R. Floyd (Roy Scheider))
- Airwolf (Michael 'Archangel' Coldsmith Briggs III (Alex Cord))
- A Beautiful Mind (Dr. Rosen (Christopher Plummer))
- Combat! (Sgt. John Metcalf (Robert Culp))
- Creature from the Black Lagoon (David Reed (Richard Carlson))
- Death Wish (Ames Jainchill (Stuart Margolin))
- Dr. Strangelove (1971 TV Asahi edition) (Brigadier General Jack D. Ripper (Sterling Hayden))
- Dune (Liet-Kynes (Max von Sydow))
- Face to Face (1977 TV Asahi edition) (Charley "Chas" A. Siringo (William Berger))
- The Godfather (1976 NTV edition) (Moe Greene (Alex Rocco))
- The Great Escape (1971 Fuji TV edition) (Flight Lieutenant Hendley (James Garner))
- Kill Bill: Volume 1 (Bill (David Carradine))
- Kill Bill: Volume 2 (Bill (David Carradine))
- Mission: Impossible 2 (Mission Commander Swanbeck (Anthony Hopkins))
- My Cousin Vinny (Judge Chamberlain Haller (Fred Gwynne))
- Nosferatu the Vampyre (Count Dracula (Klaus Kinski))
- The Pit and the Pendulum (Nicholas / Sebastian Medina (Vincent Price))
- Scanners (1987 NTV edition) (Braedon Keller (Lawrence Dane))
- The Six Million Dollar Man (Oscar Goldman (Richard Anderson))
- Total Recall (Vilos Cohaagen (Ronny Cox))

==== Animation ====
- Atlantis: Milo's Return (Erik Hellstrom)
- Corpse Bride (Pastor Galswells)
- Delgo (General Raius)
- Ratatouille (Anton Ego)
- Teenage Mutant Ninja Turtles (D Jin)
