= Richard Rood (violinist) =

American violinist

Richard Rood (born November, 1955 in Cleveland, Ohio) is an American Grammy Award-winning violinist based in New York City. His career has spanned classical music, chamber music, contemporary jazz, and commercial music including Broadway and film soundtracks.

Rood is one of the Concertmasters of the Orpheus Chamber Orchestra, a 1st violinist of the New York City Opera, the Associate Concertmaster of the Santa Fe Opera, and Concertmaster of the Performance Santa Fe Orchestra. He is also a Principal player with the American Symphony Orchestra and a member of the American Ballet Theatre Orchestra. He has performed with The New York Philharmonic, the New York City Ballet Orchestra, and has appeared as Concertmaster of Los Angeles Opera, Orchestra of St. Luke's, the Brooklyn Philharmonic, and the Collegiate Choral. Rood also performed as a Principal violinist with Lincoln Center's Mostly Mozart Festival for fifteen years.

Rood has performed in over 20 countries, appeared on over 75 recordings, been nominated for Grammy Awards for recordings with the Harmonie Ensemble, John Patitucci, and the Atlantic Symphonietta. In 2000, as a member of Orpheus, he won a Grammy Award for the album Shadow Dances: Stravinsky Miniatures.

The New York Times praised him as "an especially fine young violinist", and the Newark Star-Ledger similarly raved that "he is worth his weight in gold". His recordings of concerti of Bach and Vivaldi have been critically acclaimed, as well as chamber recordings of Copland and Dvořák. His recordings of the Terzetto and Octet Serenade on the Dvorak Discoveries CD were recognized by The New York Times as one of their "Five Favorite CDs" for the 2004 Dvorak Centennial.

Rood received an Honorary Doctorate from Case Western Reserve University in 2010 as a member of Orpheus Chamber Orchestra.

Rood can also be heard on some pop music recordings including the Oscar-winning song My Heart Will Go On sung by Celine Dion, featured in the film Titanic, and playing a violin solo in Britney Spears’ album cut When Your Eyes Say It. He contributed to movie soundtracks including The Truman Show. Stephen Sondheim also hired him to play excerpts of upcoming musical projects for private parties.

== Career ==
Highlights of his career include his first solo TV appearance at the age of 12, a solo Bach appearances in Geneva, Switzerland as a Swiss violin competition 1st prize winner at the age of 18, and performances as soloist in Mozart's Sinfonia Concertante at the Lincoln Center Mostly Mozart Festival.

Rood has held 1st violin positions with Steve Reich and Musicians, and the Music Today ensembles, performing over 100 premiers. He has also held positions in An Die Musik and the Omega ensembles performing residencies and tours throughout the United States. In addition he is a former principal player with Solisti New York, Philharmonia Virtuosi, and the New York Chamber Symphony (20 years). Having performed in over 20 countries he has been frequently sought after as a guest artist with Speculum Musicae, Eos, Da Capo, Harmonie, North Country, Houston Da Camera, and the American Chamber Ensembles.

\Rood is on the faculty at Columbia University as an adjunct violin professor, and has coached at the Juilliard School, Manhattan School of Music, and the Interlochen Arts Academy through the Orpheus Institute. He has also given masterclasses at the Masterworks Festival, SUNY Potsdam, and the Norwalk Youth Symphony, and judged competitions at the Juilliard School, New York Youth Symphony, and New Jersey Youth Symphony.

Rood is also active in the genre of jazz. With Orpheus, he recorded with Herbie Hancock, on the Grammy Award-winning "Gershwin's World." He has also recorded on several occasions with jazz bassist John Patitucci, leading to three additional Grammy Award nominations. Richard has also performed with such contemporary jazz greats as Freddie Hubbard and Pat Metheny.

Rood received bachelor's and master's degree from the Manhattan School of Music. His principal teachers include Margaret Randall, Charles Castleman, and Raphael Bronstein.

Rood is married to violinist Denise Rood and they reside in Pelham Manor, New York.
