= Denise Rood =

Denise Rood (born 1955), violinist, has for 15 years been a member of Philharmonia Virtuosi Chamber Orchestra and is currently a member of the Santa Fe Opera. She has participated in numerous concert tours of Japan and North America, and dozens of recordings with EOS, Philharmonia Virtuosi, and the American Symphony Orchestra. Rood was formerly a member of the Goldovsky Opera Company, performing in over 75 American cities. Her recording of Copland and Barber with the Atlantic Symphonietta was nominated for a Grammy award.

She is married to violinist Richard Rood.
