= Mary Rood =

British artist

Mary Rood or Roode was an 18th-century English silversmith.

Little is known about Rood. Her maiden name appears to have been Roode and she was possibly the widow of largeworker James Rood when she registered two marks, for sterling and new standard, on 2 December 1721. She gave an address in Maiden Lane, and was classified as a largerworker as well.

A pair of saltcellars, made by Rood between 1724 and 1725, are currently owned by the Metropolitan Museum of Art. Another pair of George III trencher salts, dating to 1723, are in the collection of the National Museum of Women in the Arts. A third set of trencher salts, also dated 1724/5, are in the silver holdings of the Museum of Fine Arts, Boston. Other similar pieces with her mark have also survived, all dating to the 1720s.
