= Esther Roord =

Dutch actress (1965–2026)

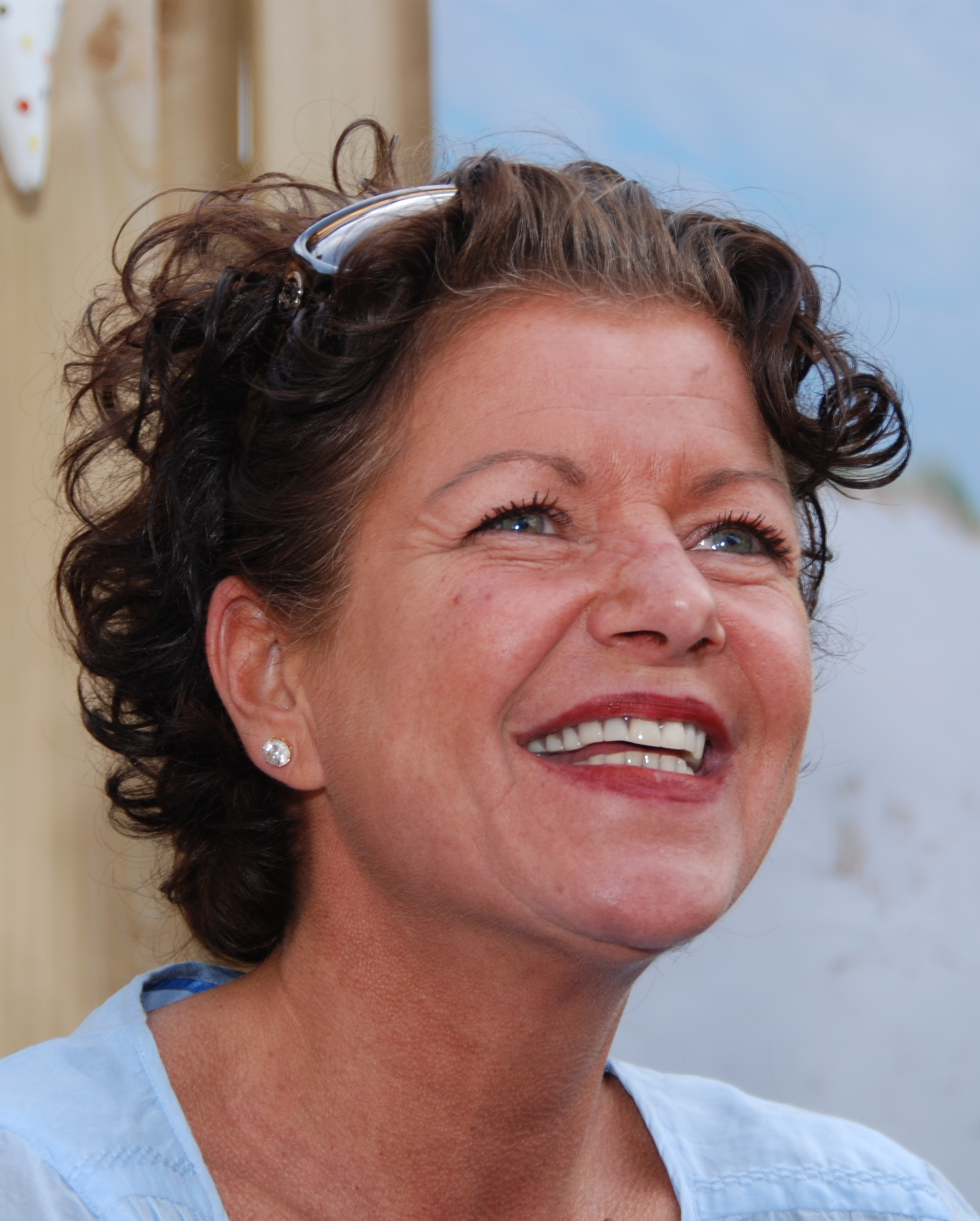
- Born: 25 January 1965; Bussum, Noord-Holland, Netherlands
- Died: 25 March 2026 (aged 61); Amsterdam, Netherlands
- Occupation: Actress
- Years active: 1992–2010

Esther Roord (25 January 1965 – 25 March 2026) was a Dutch actress.

== Life and career ==
Roord was born in Bussum, Noord-Holland, Netherlands, on 25 January 1965. She graduated from the Academy of Theatre and Dance in Amsterdam in 1991.

She was popular as neighbor Sonja in the comedy series, Kees and Co (1997) broadcast by RTL 4 from 1997 to 2006. She was also known for Flikken Maastricht (2007) and Baantjer (1995).

== Death ==
Roord died in her hometown of Amsterdam on 25 March 2026, aged 61.
