= Prince Planet =

Japanese anime television series

- Selections from U.S. version, including title card.

遊星少年パピイ (Yūsei Shōnen Papī)
- Genre: Adventure, science fiction
- Created by: Seiichiro Yoshizuka
- Anime television series
- Directed by: Sato Ōkura
- Music by: Hidehiko Arashino
- Studio: TCJ (now Eiken)
- Licensed by: NA: American International Television; catalog now controlled by Orion Television, a subsidiary of MGM Television
- Original network: Fuji TV
- English network: AU: Nine Network; US: First-run syndication
- Original run: 3 June 1965 – 27 May 1966
- Episodes: 52

Prince Planet is the English-language title given to one of the earliest anime television series, Planet Boy Papi (遊星少年パピイ, Yūsei Shōnen Papī), when it was transmitted on American television in the United States in the mid-1960s. It did run on "The Works" television network before it ceased operations February 28, 2017. A 52-episode monochrome anime series, it tells the story of a member of the Universal Peace Corps, originally from the planet Radion, coming to Earth on a mission to determine if this world meets standards for membership in the Galactic Union of Worlds and assist its inhabitants during his stay. While on his mission, Prince Planet adopts the identity of an Earth boy named Bobby and gains comrades who work together alongside him fighting forces of evil, both alien and terrestrial.

== Production overview and history ==
Prince Planet was originally produced by TCJ (Television Corporation of Japan, now Eiken) and aired on the Fuji Television network in June 1965. The show was one of the first heavily merchandised shows in Japan, with simple things like shoes getting the "Planet Boy Papi" logo. An English-dubbed version was released by American International Television Productions in September 1966, and produced by James Nicholson and Samuel Z. Arkoff. The dubbing was performed in Miami at Copri Films International and directed by Mark Harris, with dialog scripting by Reuben Guberman, who also reworked The Amazing 3 for Erika Productions in 1967 and developed the live-action tokusatsu-kaiju series Giant Robo for American television, later that same year, under the title Johnny Sokko And His Flying Robot. The American theme was composed by Guy Hemric and Jerry Styner, who had previously written songs for several of American International's "Beach Party" movies. Glico was a major sponsor for the series and made Papi "prizes" that came in certain candy products. Prizes included mini action figures and play jewelry.

== Main characters ==
=== Prince Planet, allies, and enemies ===
The main characters appearing throughout most of the series are all introduced by the fourth episode. In episode 1, Prince Planet arrives on Earth and meets a girl, Riko or Diana Worthy in the English-dubbed version and her father, Pops Worthy, who live on a large ranch. In episode 2, a wrestler known as Dan Dynamo, billed as "The strongest man in the world," joins the Prince Planet team. Episode 3 introduces Warlock, who is said to be the "Master of Martian Magic," although his Martian origins seem to be more of a contrivance added to the English dub; whatever Warlock's origin, he is established as a student of some kind of magical school who runs away to Earth after being punished for getting drunk on prune juice. The last major team member is a magician named AjiBaba of Abbadon, from the desert of the eastern hemisphere who debuts in episode 4 as an arch-enemy of Warlock, who attacked his country. Many of the episodes involve battles with Warlock until episode 30, when Krag from the planet Kragmire banishes (throws) Warlock into the depths of space and becomes Prince Planet's major nemesis until the end of the series. Warlock finally returns in the second-to-last episode of the series.

=== Human guise and transformation ===
While on Earth, Prince Planet exists usually as Bobby, a normal boy, but when the need arises he will transform into Prince Planet to fight enemies or protect his friends. He transforms similarly to Shazam by holding his pendant with both hands and saying "Peeeeeee Pazow!!" with the "Pazow" being added to cover the Japanese "Papi." When Bobby is transformed into Prince Planet, an appropriate suit of battle armor comes with the transformation, armor which resembles the apparel worn by the people of his native world. This includes a helmet, which all male members of Radion society seem to wear.

=== The super-humanoid powers of Prince Planet ===
Prince Planet's main powers are not altogether unlike those of Superman, and in the original Japanese, his home world is named "the planet Crifton." His pendant-endowed powers include super strength, flight, and resistance to harsh environments like outer space, though he can be injured in his transformed state. Prince Planet can also use his superior intellect (in several episodes, he is said to have an IQ of 200) along with the energy of the pendant to transform material objects at will; this power is very useful to create needed weapons, transportation, or other devices.

==== The power pendant of Prince Planet ====
A recurring plot element of many episodes hinges on a limitation resembling that of the Green Lantern of DC Comics, in that his pendant needs to be recharged periodically, 24 hours for the Green Lantern and an entire week for Prince Planet. But unlike the Green Lantern, Prince Planet cannot perform this task himself. Instead, replenishment of the pendant's energy is handled from the planet Radion. As his energy supply diminishes, the "P" in his pendant goes from black to white like a thermometer in dropping temperatures.

On Prince Planet's home planet of Radion, in the "power tower," there is a person whose job is to monitor the pendant's energy level and ensure that it does not run too low. Not surprisingly in view of this plot element, the custodian of the Radion power tower often appears to be "asleep on the job" while Earth and Prince Planet are hanging in the balance, and he sends energy to the pendant at the last possible second before disaster. Even whenever he has been completely deprived of the pendant's power, however, Prince Planet can still, physically, put up a good fight, and his high intellect makes him a cunning and formidable opponent.

== Japanese Cast ==
- Toshiko Fujita as Papi (Bobby)
- Eiko Masuyama as Rico (Diana)
- Ichirō Murakoshi as Kiribito (Warlock)
- Jou Fujimoto as Chakoron
- Kazuo Nagayama as Strong (Dan Dynamo)
- Reizō Nomoto as Zenoroy
- Yoshihisa Kamo as AjiBaba

== English dub voice talent ==
- Catherine "Bobbie" Byers (voice of Prince Planet, Bobby, various female voices)
- Mark Harris (voice of Dan Dynamo, various voices)
- Kurt Nagel (voice of AjiBaba, various voices)
- Arnie Warren (voice of Warlock, various voices)
- Frank Schuller (voice Of Krag, various voices)
- Sandy Warshaw (voice of Diana Worthy, various female voices)
- Jeff Gillen (voice of Pop Worthy, various voices)
- Other voices performed by: Reuben Guberman, Lawrence Tobin, Jerry Berke

== Episode list ==
- 1. A Boy From Outer Space
- 2. Giant On The Matters
- 3. The Formidable Rival
- 4. The Arabian Magician
- 5. Flying Jellyfish
- 6. Dinosaur Men
- 7. A Big Showdown
- 8. Robot Island
- 9. The Overgrown Lizard
- 10. Shaberia
- 11. Fancy Machine
- 12. S.O.S. Global
- 13. Gold Picker
- 14. Attack Of Radioactive Ants
- 15. The Great Space War
- 16. The Star In Memory
- 17. The Space Zoo
- 18. The Stolen Mt. Fuji
- 19. Pirate Satan
- 20. The Planet Terror
- 21. Robot No. 9
- 22. Goodbye Saturnean
- 23. The Earth Zero Hour
- 24. The Ghost Space Ship
- 25. Battle On A Desert Island
- 26. Secret Under The Sea
- 27. The Rocket Pilot
- 28. Gaist, the Devilish
- 29. The Gift From Prince Planet
- 30. Gollen, the Formidable Foe
- 31. The Pollen Bomb
- 32. Operation Rico
- 33. Rico, The Great Detective
- 34. A Spy From The Necro
- 35. The Demon Scientist
- 36. The Young Spies
- 37. Alan, The Secret Agent
- 38. The Magic Gloves
- 39. Robot Prince
- 40. Rico's Adventure
- 41. The Lion In Desert
- 42. Crisis On The Earth
- 43. The Horror Of A Snowman
- 44. Revenge In The Valley
- 45. The Comet Missile
- 46. The Mystery Of Mummy
- 47. The Mystery Of Organ
- 48. Horror At 10:10 P.M.
- 49. The Birdman Racket
- 50. Secret Path Into The Earth
- 51. Ajababa's Children
- 52. The Star At Home

== Other foreign releases and dubs ==
Prince Planet was televised in Australia and aired in Melbourne in March 1967 on Channel 9 at 5 pm weekdays. The series was well known in Australia. It last appeared on Australian television in 1974 on the Super Flying Fun Show, a weekday breakfast television series.

In Brazil, Prince Planet aired between 1970 and 1975. The characters were known by the following names:

- Diana Worthy - "Estrellita"
- Dan Dynamo - "Bruno Retti" or "Strong"
- Warlock - "Capirote"
- Krag - "Kilitrone"

== Reception ==
Two factors contributed to the hasty demise of Prince Planet as a desirable property for domestic broadcast, one being the fact that monochrome programing was becoming less desirable to television stations with the ever-growing popularity of color television. The other was negative parental reaction to cartoons that contained what was perceived as excessive violence for children's television. Whilst he was fighting for right, Prince Planet's opponents were often killed when they faced off against him, and this was obvious even despite editing of the dubbed prints to remove violent scenes. Prince Planet kills Warlock and Krag in the last two episodes before returning home to Radion, and they were not the only villains he blasted away with his pendant.

In addition to human violence, the Prince was not overly sensitive to Earth fauna either. For instance, in one episode, he transformed a whale into transportation for his friends, effectively killing the whale. Even so, Prince Planet is known to have been televised in the U.S.A until around 1976 in the Chicago area (WSNS-TV Channel 44) on stations hungry for afternoon TV for children to watch after school, and the program claimed many faithful adherents throughout the sixties and those later years. It was also televised on WUTV channel 29 Buffalo, New York, in the summer of 1975.

== Home video ==
Something weird home video included a Prince Planet episode as a bonus on both of their DVD releases of Starman. TGG Direct released a 5-disc box set containing 47 of the 52 episodes of the series on July 15, 2014, on Region 1 DVD.
