= Restol, The Special Rescue Squad =

- Genre: Science fiction, mecha
- Created by: KBS; Diamond AD; Seoul Movie
- Written by: Taekwan Kim
- Directed by: Dongik Lee
- Country of origin: South Korea
- Original languages: Korean; Japanese
- No. of seasons: 1
- No. of episodes: 26

Production
- Producer: Joonghwan Lee
- Running time: 25 minutes
- Production company: Seoul Movie

Original release
- Network: KBS2 (South Korea); NHK BS2 (Japan)
- Release: January 21 – July 23, 1999

RESTOL Special Rescue Squad (Korean: 레스톨 특수구조대) is a South Korean animated television series created by Seoul Movie.

== Plot ==
In 2034, the future world experienced serious natural disasters. In 2035, GEONOID was established as a company in order to protect the earth against natural calamities. Furthermore, the organization set up SRS (Special Rescue Services) that consists of the orbiting rescue station R-SAT, five RESTOL units, and the Shell Diver carrier ship.

Kang Maru, a 14-year-old boy, was chosen by GEONOID via a simulation video game competition to pilot RESTOL unit 03, as he demonstrated superb skills.

== Releases ==
Country	Release date	Title
South Korea	January 29, 1999	레스톨 특수구조대 (KBS)
Japan	October 5, 1999	装甲救助部隊レストル (NHK BS2)
Hong Kong	October 17, 2000	Telecast Station (TVB)
Philippines		Restol (ABC-5)
Serbia		Restol (Kanal D)

== Castings ==
The following castings are based on Korean version.

- Kang Maru (강마루)—Choi Won-hyeong
- Oming (오밍)—Kim Hye-mi
- Mia (미아)—Kim Su-gyeong
- Punky (펑키)—Seong Byeong-suk
- Heron (헤론)—Choi Byeong-sang
- Lucifer (루시퍼)—Choi Byeong-sang
- Victor (빅터)—Choi Byeong-sang
- Reth (레스사령관)—Choi Mun-ja
- Kou (코우선장)—Jang Gwang
- Kain (카인)—Kang Gu-han
- Jin (진)—Kim Il
- Hanse (한스)—Lee Jeong-gu
- Jei (제이)—Lim Eun-jeong
