= Tatakae! Osper =

Japanese manga and anime series

戦え!オスパー
- Genre: Science fiction
- Manga
- Written by: Kōichi Yamano
- Illustrated by: Takashi Ina
- Published by: Shōnen Gahōsha
- Magazine: Weekly Shōnen King
- Anime television series
- Directed by: Kosei Ikeba; Kozo Masanobu; Masami Niikura; Nobuhiro Okasako; Ryoichi Asano; Yoshiyuki Tomino
- Produced by: Masami Niikura
- Written by: Kōichi Yamano; Teru Nagashima
- Music by: Isao Tomita
- Studio: Nihon Hoso Eigasha
- Original network: NTV
- Original run: December 14, 1965 – October 31, 1967
- Episodes: 52

Tatakae! Osper (戦え(たたかえ)!オスパー, Tatakae! Osupā; "Fight! Osper") is a Japanese manga series written by Kōichi Yamano and drawn by Takashi Ina that was serialized in Shōnen Gahōsha's Weekly Shōnen King, as well as an anime series also written by Yamano.

== Plot ==
After the catastrophe that destroyed their continent, the inhabitants of Mu have adapted to living in the ocean, in cities covered by huge domes. Many years later, the inhabitants become psychic.

During an annual battle held to determine who is the best Mu psychic, Osper, a boy with a strong sense of justice, battles Drome, an older, brutish boy who is vengeful and evil. Osper wins the battle and after being defeated, Drome destroys the dome in revenge and escapes to Earth. Osper is sent to chase Drome and avenge his people. Above ground, Osper meets Yumi Kaizu, the daughter of the head of a police special forces unit, the International Crusader Police (国際十字警察, Kokusai Jūji Keisatsu). With the collaboration of Kaizu, who brought Osper into her unit, Osper follows the tracks of Drome to locate him.

Strange incidents occur on Earth, but on a scale never seen before. As it is revealed that Drome was the one who was involved in all of these incidents, Osper fights him and solves each cases, whereas Drome flees every time.

After being cornered, Drome activates the ultimate weapon to destroy the Earth, and engages Osper on the place be prepared for a final battle. After a fierce battle, Osper is victorious and Drome admits defeat to him by saying, "All the bad things I've done so far are due to the fact that I was not able to defeat you and win". In his final hours, he notifies Osper of the location of the ultimate weapon. Osper immediately stops the ultimate weapon from operating, which allows both Drome and Osper to return to their home world under the sea. Chief Kaizu, who learned of Osper's return, reads a letter left by Osper for Yumi, which states "The next time I meet you, I want to be a ordinary person".

== Characters ==
Osper (オスパー, Osupā)
Voiced by: Keiko Yamamoto
A Mu psychic. He comes from the undersea world in pursuit of Drome. He becomes a member of International Crusader Police at the recommendation of Yumi and used five types of supernatural powers to fight against Drome and the evil of the Earth. He specializes in teleportation.
Drome (ドロメ, Dorome)
Voiced by: Ryo Abe
An ambitious and brutish psychic who rivals Osper. He destroyed and fled from the dome of Mu in revenge for losing the battle against Osper, and joins the evil of the Earth. He specializes in telekinesis.
Yumi Kaizu (海津 ユミ, Kaizu Yumi)
Voiced by: Megumi Tama
She met Osper while he was on Earth's surface and invited him to the International Crusader Police, led by her father, Chief Kaizu.
Chief Kaizu (海津 長官, Kaizu Chōkan)
Voiced by: Iemasa Kayumi
Yumi's father who is the head of International Crusader Police.
Robert (ロバート, Robāto)
Voiced by: Akira Okuhara
A member of the International Crusader Police.

== Media ==
=== Anime ===
The series was broadcast on NTV from December 14, 1965, to October 31, 1967. Of these, the episodes ran from December 13, 1966, to October 24, 1967, were actually reruns of the previous episodes. An amount of 52 episodes were produced.

Until December 28, 1965, the series was initially aired every Tuesday from 18:15 to 18:45 (Japan Standard Time) but starting from January 4, 1966, it was broadcast every Tuesday from 18:00 to 18:30. In the first half of the broadcast, the program was broadcast without a specific sponsor, but in the second half of the broadcast with was provided by a cooperative dairy company, Kyodo Milk Industry which also sponsored in rebroadcasts until the middle of the broadcast. Later, it was sponsored by Utena, a cosmetic manufacturer.

It was NTV's first anime to have broadcast in the network. However, it has never been released on home video and is rarely featured in retrospective programs. In addition, the whereabouts of film masters for all episodes of the series were unknown until 2022 as Nihon Terebi Dōga had dissolved. The opening of Fight! Osper was included in the anime theme compilation Mania Aizo Han Natsukashi 〜TV Anime Tema Collection(マニア愛蔵版 懐かし〜いTVアニメテーマコレクション, Maniac's Treasured Edition Nostalgia: TV Anime Theme Collection) released on VHS and laserdisc by Hummingbird.

As of 2026, 4 episodes are known to survive and subsequently restored by the efforts of a crowd fund on Camp Fire. The episode, "Fight! Horde of Osper Poisonous Moths" (戦え！オスパー毒蛾の大群) was found in an abandoned warehouse and given a limited release on DVD. Due to the fragility of the film itself, the film was shown only once at the Tokyo Cine Center in late 2022. As of 2023, a copy of the DVD is now on view to the public at the National Diet, The second surviving episode, "Drome's Last Stand" (ドロメのさいごの戦い) was rediscovered in 2025 and was screened alongside other newly discovered surviving episodes from other shows by Nihon Terebi Dōga on December 14. "A Mermaid's Tears" (人魚のなみだ) and "Comics Forever" (まんがよいつまでも), the 36th and 39th episodes respectively, are planned to be screened on July 26 alongside with other surviving material created for the anime and a few surviving episodes of "Tobidase! Bacchiri" (とびだせ!バッチリ), which was another anime series produced by Nihon Terebi Dōga.

==== Episode list ====
No.	Title	Original release date
1	"The Two Boys from the Sea"; Transliteration: "Umi Kara Kita Futari no Shōnen" (Japanese: 海から来たふたりの少年)	December 14, 1965
2	"Prophet Salabad"; Transliteration: "Yogen-sha Sarabādo" (Japanese: 予言者サラバード)	December 21, 1965
3	"The Psychic Horse Pegasus"; Transliteration: "Chō Nōryoku-ma Pegasasu" (Japanese: 超能力馬ペガサス)	December 28, 1965
4	"Kasim Is Calling To Me"; Transliteration: "Kashimu ga Boku o Yonde Iru" (Japanese: カシムがぼくを呼んでいる)	January 4, 1966
5	"Phantom Battleship"; Transliteration: "Yūrei Senkan" (Japanese: ゆうれい戦艦)	January 11, 1966
6	"Glowing Face in the Darkness"; Transliteration: "Yami ni Hikaru Kao" (Japanese: やみに光る顔)	January 18, 1966
7	"Phoenix"; Transliteration: "Hinotori" (Japanese: 火の鳥)	January 25, 1966
8	"Prince of the Desert"; Transliteration: "Sabaku no Ōji" (Japanese: 砂漠の王子)	February 1, 1966
9	"Poison Man #7"; Transliteration: "Doku Ningen 7-gō" (Japanese: 毒人間7号)	February 8, 1966
10	"Sorrowful Brother"; Transliteration: "Kanashī Kyōdai" (Japanese: かなしい兄弟)	February 15, 1966
11	"Yumi's Happiness"; Transliteration: "Yumi no Shiawase" (Japanese: ユミのしあわせ)	February 22, 1966
12	"A City Filled With Many Villains"; Transliteration: "Akunin no Ōi Machi" (Japanese: 悪人の多い街)	March 1, 1966
13	"Bloody Seeds"; Transliteration: "Chi o Sū tane" (Japanese: 血をすうタネ)	March 8, 1966
14	"Avec Robot"; Transliteration: "Abekku Robotto" (Japanese: アベックロボット)	March 15, 1966
15	"Gate of Hell"; Transliteration: "Jigoku no Mon" (Japanese: 地獄の門)	March 22, 1966
16	"Battle of the Nightmares"; Transliteration: "Akumu no Tatakai" (Japanese: 悪夢のたたかい)	March 29, 1966
17	"Cyborg Hide"; Transliteration: "Saibōgu Hide" (Japanese: サイボーグ・ヒデ)	April 5, 1966
18	"Mottled Dog"; Transliteration: "Madara no Inu" (Japanese: まだらの犬)	April 12, 1966
19	"Sleepy Granny"; Transliteration: "Nemuri Baba a" (Japanese: ねむりばばあ)	April 19, 1966
20	"Snake and the Flying Saucer"; Transliteration: "Hebi to En Ban" (Japanese: へびと円ばん)	April 26, 1966
21	"Secrets of the Ranch"; Transliteration: "Bokujō no Himitsu" (Japanese: 牧場の秘密)	May 3, 1966
22	"Phantom of the Circus"; Transliteration: "Sākasu no Kaijin" (Japanese: まだらの犬)	May 10, 1966
23	"Battle of India"; Transliteration: "Indo no Tatakai" (Japanese: インドの戦い)	May 17, 1966
24	"Big Face"; Transliteration: "Ōkina Kao" (Japanese: 大きな顔)	May 24, 1966
25	"Radiance of the Earth"; Transliteration: "Chikyū no Kagayaki" (Japanese: 地球のかがやき)	May 31, 1966
26	"Big Race"; Transliteration: "Dai Rēsu" (Japanese: 大レース)	June 7, 1966
27	"Secret Underground Fortress"; Transliteration: "Himitsu Chika Yōsai" (Japanese: 秘密地下要塞)	June 14, 1966
28	"5,000 km Pursuit"; Transliteration: "Tsuiseki 5000-kiro" (Japanese: 追跡5000キロ)	June 21, 1966
29	"Ice Beast S-udd"; Transliteration: "Hyōjū S Ddo" (Japanese: 氷獣Sッド)	June 28, 1966
30	"Black Hands"; Transliteration: "Kuroi Te" (Japanese: 黒い手)	July 5, 1966
31	"Fireball Apprentice"; Transliteration: "Hinotama Kozō" (Japanese: 火の玉小僧)	July 12, 1966
32	"$10 Billion Treasure"; Transliteration: "10 Oku-doru no Takara" (Japanese: 10億ドルの宝)	July 19, 1966
33	"Stone Town"; Transliteration: "Ishi no Machi" (Japanese: 石の町)	July 26, 1966
34	"The Ruler of the Jungle"; Transliteration: "Janguru no Shihai-sha" (Japanese: ジャングルの支配者)	August 2, 1966
35	"Greco's Rebellion"; Transliteration: "Gureko no Hanran" (Japanese: グレコの反乱)	August 9, 1966
36	"A Mermaid's Tears"; Transliteration: "Ningyo no Namida" (Japanese: 人魚のなみだ)	August 16, 1966
37	"The Resurrected Phantom"; Transliteration: "Yomigaetta Kaijin" (Japanese: よみがえった怪人)	August 23, 1966
38	"People Sleeping on the Seabed"; Transliteration: "Kaitei ni Nemuru Hito" (Japanese: 海底にねむる人)	August 30, 1966
39	"Comics Forever"; Transliteration: "Manga Yoi Tsuma de Mo" (Japanese: まんがよいつまでも)	September 6, 1966
40	"Castle of Terror"; Transliteration: "Manga yo Towa ni" (Japanese: 恐怖の城)	September 13, 1966
41	"A Town Attacked by Poisonous Moths"; Transliteration: "Dokuga ni Osowa Reta Machi" (Japanese: 毒蛾におそわれた町)	September 20, 1966
42	"Plant Human"; Transliteration: "Jokubutsuningen" (Japanese: 植物人間)	September 27, 1966
43	"The Great Naval Battle"; Transliteration: "Dai Kaisen" (Japanese: 大海戦)	October 4, 1966
44	"The Cave Monster"; Transliteration: "Dōkutsu no Kaijū" (Japanese: 洞窟の怪獣)	October 11, 1966
45	"The City of Illusion"; Transliteration: "Maboroshi no Toshi" (Japanese: まぼろしの都市)	October 18, 1966
46	"Be Caught, Drome"; Transliteration: "Dorome Tsukamaru" (Japanese: ドロメつかまる)	October 25, 1966
47	"Dinosaur Island"; Transliteration: "Kyōryū no Shima" (Japanese: 恐竜の島)	November 1, 1966
48	"Dr. Lion's Second Castle"; Transliteration: "Raion Hakase no Dai 2 no Shiro" (Japanese: ライオン博士の第2の城)	November 8, 1966
49	"Dancing Devil"; Transliteration: "Odoru Majin" (Japanese: 踊る魔神)	November 15, 1966
50	"The World of Babies"; Transliteration: "Akanbō no Sekai" (Japanese: 赤んぼうの世界)	November 22, 1966
51	"Devil's Mountain"; Transliteration: "Ma no Yama" (Japanese: 魔の山)	November 29, 1966
52	"Drome's Last Stand"; Transliteration: "Dorome no Saigonotatakai" (Japanese: ドロメのさいごの戦い)	December 6, 1966
