= List of American animated television series =

The following is a list of animated television series, including those produced for streaming, that originate from the United States of America.

== American animated television series ==
For animated shows produced by entities that have since been re-organized, their former names are listed in brackets. All channels listed are American unless otherwise noted.

=== 0-9 ===
| Title | Seasons | Episodes | Year | Original channel | American company | Note | Age rating | Technique |
|---|---|---|---|---|---|---|---|---|
| ¡Mucha Lucha! | 2 | 52 | 2002–2005 | Kids' WB | Warner Bros. Animation | | TV-Y7 | Flash |
| 2 Stupid Dogs / Super Secret Secret Squirrel | 2 | 26 | 1993–1995 | TBS | Hanna-Barbera | | TV-Y7 | Traditional |
| 3-2-1 Penguins! | 3 | 27 | 2000–2008 | Direct-to-video | Big Idea Productions | | TV-Y7 | CGI |
| 3-South | 1 | 13 | 2002–2003 | MTV | Warner Bros. Animation; MTV Animation | | TV-14 | Traditional |
| 3Below: Tales of Arcadia | 2 | 28 | 2018–2019 | Netflix | DreamWorks Animation Television | | TV-Y7 | CGI |
| 3rd & Bird | 2 | 51 | 2008–2010 | Playhouse Disney | Little Airplane Productions | British co-production | TV-Y | Flash |
| 12 oz. Mouse | 3 | 31 | 2005–2020 | Adult Swim | Williams Street | | TV-MA | Flash |
| 101 Dalmatians: The Series | 2 | 65 | 1997–1998 | ABC; Syndication | Jumbo Pictures; Disney Television Animation | | TV-Y | Traditional |

=== A ===
| Title | Seasons | Episodes | Year | Original channel | American company | Note | Age rating | Technique |
|---|---|---|---|---|---|---|---|---|
| A Bunch of Munsch | 1 | 7 | 1991–1992 | Showtime | | Canadian co-production | TV-Y | Traditional |
| A Little Curious | 2 | 43 | 1999–2000 | HBO | Curious Pictures | | TV-Y | Traditional/CGI/Stop-Motion/Live-Action |
| A Pup Named Scooby-Doo | 3 | 27 | 1988–1991 | ABC | Hanna-Barbera | | TV-G | Traditional |
| A Tale Dark & Grimm | 1 | 10 | 2021 | Netflix | Netflix Animation | Canadian co-production | TV-Y7 | CGI |
| Aaahh!!! Real Monsters | 4 | 52 | 1994–1997 | Nickelodeon | Klasky Csupo; Games Animation | | TV-Y | Traditional |
| Abby's Flying Fairy School | 1 | 26 | 2009–2012 | PBS Kids | Sesame Workshop | | TV-Y | CGI |
| Abominable and the Invisible City | 2 | 20 | 2022–2023 | Hulu; Peacock | DreamWorks Animation Television | | TV-Y7 | CGI |
| Ace Ventura: Pet Detective | 2 | 41 | 1995–2000 | CBS; Nickelodeon | Nelvana | Canadian co-production | TV-Y7 | Traditional |
| Action League Now! | 1 | 12 | 2001–2002 | Nickelodeon | Nickelodeon Animation Studio | | TV-Y7 | Stop-Motion |
| Action Man (1995) | 1 | 26 | 1995–1996 | Syndication | DIC Entertainment | | TV-Y7 | Traditional/Live-Action |
| Action Man (2000) | 1 | 26 | 2000–2001 | Fox Kids | Saban Entertainment | Canadian co-production | TV-Y7 | CGI |
| Action Pack | 1 | 17 | 2022 | Netflix | OddBot Inc. | British-Canadian co-production | TV-Y | CGI |
| Ada Twist, Scientist | 4 | 41 | 2021–2023 | Netflix | Netflix Animation | | TV-Y | CGI |
| ADHD Shorts | 1 | 6 | 2013–2015 | Fox | ADHD Studios | | TV-14 | Flash |
| Adventure Time | 10 | 283 | 2010–2018 | Cartoon Network | Frederator Studios; Cartoon Network Studios | | TV-PG | Traditional |
| Adventure Time: Distant Lands | 1 | 4 | 2020–2021 | HBO Max | Frederator Studios; Cartoon Network Studios | | TV-PG | Traditional |
| Adventure Time: Fionna and Cake | 1 | 10 | 2023 | Max | Frederator Studios; Cartoon Network Studios | | TV-14 | Traditional |
| Adventure Time: Side Quests | 1 | 20 | 2026-present | Hulu; Disney+ | Cartoon Network Studios | | TV-PG | Traditional |
| Adventures from the Book of Virtues | 3 | 39 | 1996–2000 | PBS; PBS Kids | PorchLight Entertainment | | TV-Y7 | Traditional |
| Adventures of Pow Wow | 1 | 45 | 1956–1957 | Syndication | Tempe-Toons | | —N/a | Traditional |
| Adventures of Sonic the Hedgehog | 1 | 65 | 1992–1996 | Syndication | DIC Entertainment | Italian co-production | TV-Y | Traditional |
| Adventures of the Gummi Bears | 6 | 65 | 1985–1991 | NBC | Walt Disney Television Animation | | TV-Y | Traditional |
| Ӕon Flux | 2 | 16 | 1991–1995 | MTV | MTV Animation | | TV-14 | Traditional |
| Agent Elvis | 1 | 10 | 2023 | Netflix | Sony Pictures Animation | | TV-MA | Traditional |
| Aladdin | 3 | 86 | 1994–1995 | CBS | Walt Disney Television Animation | | TV-Y | Traditional |
| ALF Tales | 2 | 21 | 1988–1989 | NBC | DIC Entertainment | | TV-Y | Traditional |
| ALF: The Animated Series | 2 | 26 | 1987–1989 | NBC | DIC Entertainment | | TV-Y | Traditional |
| Alice's Wonderland Bakery | 2 | 50 | 2022–2024 | Disney Junior | Disney Television Animation | | TV-Y | CGI |
| Alien: Isolation – The Digital Series | 1 | 7 | 2019 | IGN | Reverse Engineering Studios | | TV-MA | CGI |
| Alien News Desk | 1 | 12 | 2019 | Syfy | Broadway Video | | TV-MA | Traditional |
| Alien Racers | 1 | 26 | 2005–2006 | Fox | SD Entertainment | Canadian co-production | TV-Y7 | CGI |
| Alienators: Evolution Continues | 1 | 26 | 2001–2002 | Fox Kids | DIC Entertainment, L.P. | French-Japanese co-production | TV-Y7 | Traditional |
| All Dogs Go to Heaven: The Series | 2 | 40 | 1996–1998 | Fox Family Channel | MGM Animation | | TV-Y | Traditional |
| All Grown Up! | 3 | 55 | 2003–2008 | Nickelodeon | Klasky Csupo; Nickelodeon Animation Studio | | TV-Y7 | Traditional |
| All Hail King Julien | 6 | 78 | 2014–2017 | Netflix | DreamWorks Animation Television | | TV-Y7 | CGI |
| Allen Gregory | 1 | 7 | 2011 | Fox | Chernin Entertainment | | TV-14 | Flash |
| Alma's Way | 2 | 52 | 2021–present | PBS Kids | Fred Rogers Productions | | TV-Y | Flash |
| Alvin and the Chipmunks | 8 | 102 | 1983–1990 | NBC | Bagdasarian Productions | | TV-G | Traditional |
| Alvinnn!!! and the Chipmunks | 5 | 130 | 2015–2023 | Nickelodeon | Bagdasarian Productions | French co-production | TV-Y7 | CGI |
| American Dad! | 22 | 403 | 2005–present | Fox (2005–2014, 2026–present); TBS (2014–2025) | Fuzzy Door Productions | | TV-14 | Traditional |
| American Dragon: Jake Long | 2 | 52 | 2005–2007 | Disney Channel | Disney Television Animation | | TV-G | Traditional |
| Among Us | 1 | 10 | 2026 | Paramount+ | CBS Eye Animation Productions | | TV-14 | Traditional |
| Amphibia | 3 | 58 | 2019–2022 | Disney Channel | Disney Television Animation | | TV-Y7 | Traditional |
| Angela Anaconda | 3 | 65 | 1999–2001 | Fox Kids | C.O.R.E. Digital Pictures | Canadian co-production | TV-Y7 | Flash |
| Angelina Ballerina: The Next Steps | 2 | 40 | 2009–2010 | PBS Kids | SD Entertainment | British co-production | TV-Y | CGI |
| Angry Birds Mystery Island | 1 | 24 | 2024 | Amazon Prime Video | Titmouse, Inc | Finnish co-production | TV-Y7 | Flash |
| Angry Birds: Summer Madness | 3 | 36 | 2022 | Netflix | Netflix Animation | British-Canadian-Finnish co-production | TV-Y7 | Flash |
| Animalia | 2 | 40 | 2007–2008 | PBS Kids Go! | PorchLight Entertainment | Australian co-production | TV-Y | CGI |
| Animals | 3 | 30 | 2016–2018 | HBO | Duplass Brothers Productions | | TV-MA | Traditional |
| Animals, Animals, Animals | 6 | | 1976–1981 | ABC | | | —N/a | Traditional/Live-action |
| Animaniacs (1993) | 5 | 99 | 1993–1998 | Fox Kids (1993–1995); Kids' WB (1995–1998) | Warner Bros. Animation | | TV-Y7 | Traditional |
| Animaniacs (2020) | 3 | 36 | 2020–2023 | Hulu | Warner Bros. Animation | | TV-Y7 | Traditional |
| Ant-Man | 1 | 6 | 2017 | Disney XD | Marvel Animation | | TV-Y7 | Traditional |
| Ape Escape | 1 | 38 | 2009 | Nicktoons Network | Frederator Studios | | TV-Y7 | Flash |
| Apollo Gauntlet | 1 | 6 | 2017 | Adult Swim | 6 Point Harness | | TV-14 | Flash |
| Apple & Onion | 2 | 76 | 2018–2021 | Cartoon Network | Cartoon Network Studios | | TV-Y7 | Flash |
| Aqua Teen Hunger Force | 12 | 144 | 2000–2015, 2023 | Adult Swim | Williams Street | | TV-14/TV-MA | Flash |
| Aquadonk Side Pieces | 1 | 10 | 2022 | YouTube | William Street | | —N/a | Flash |
| Aquaman | 1 | 36 | 1967–1970 | CBS | Filmation | | TV-Y7 | Traditional |
| Aquaman: King of Atlantis | 1 | 3 | 2021 | HBO Max | Warner Bros. Animation; DC Entertainment | | TV-Y7 | Traditional |
| Arabian Knights | 1 | 18 | 1968–1969 | NBC | Hanna-Barbera | | TV-G | Traditional |
| Arcane | 2 | 18 | 2021–2024 | Netflix | Riot Games | French co-production | TV-MA | CGI |
| Archer | 14 | 145 | 2009–2023 | FX (2009–2016); FXX (2017–2023) | Floyd County Productions | | TV-MA | Flash |
| Archibald's Next Big Thing | 6 | 50 | 2019–2021 | Netflix; Peacock | DreamWorks Animation Television | | TV-Y | Flash |
| Archie's TV Funnies | 1 | 16 | 1971–1973 | CBS | Filmation | | —N/a | Traditional |
| Archie's Weird Mysteries | 1 | 40 | 1999–2000 | Pax | DIC Entertainment | French co-production | TV-Y7 | Traditional |
| Ariel | 2 | 38 | 2024–present | Disney Jr. | Disney Television Animation | | TV-Y | CGI |
| Ark: The Animated Series | 1 | 6 | 2024–present | Paramount+ | Lex + Otis; Studio Wildcard | | TV-MA | Traditional |
| Armorsaurs | 1 | 13 | 2025–present | Disney XD | MGA Entertainment | British-South Korean co-production | TV-Y7 | CGI/Live-action |
| Around the World in 79 Days | 1 | 17 | 1969 | ABC | Hanna-Barbera | | TV-G | Traditional |
| Around the World in Eighty Days | 1 | 16 | 1972–1973 | NBC | | Australian co-production | —N/a | Traditional |
| Arthur | 25 | 253 | 1996–2022 | PBS Kids | WGBH | Canadian co-production | TV-Y | Traditional (Seasons 1-15, 20–25); Cel (Seasons 1-3); Digital ink-and-paint (Seasons 4-15, 20–25); Flash (Seasons 16-25); Adobe Flash (Seasons 16-19); Toon Boom Harmony (Seasons 20-25) |
| As Told by Ginger | 3 | 52 | 2000–2006 | Nickelodeon | Klasky Csupo; Nickelodeon Animation Studio | The last 2 episodes aired on Nicktoons leaving 6 unaired. | TV-Y7 | Traditional |
| Ask the StoryBots | 3 | 22 | 2016–2019 | Netflix | JibJab Bros. Studios | | TV-Y | CGI/Flash/Stop-Motion/Live-Action |
| Assy McGee | 2 | 20 | 2006–2008 | Adult Swim | Soup2Nuts Williams Street | | TV-MA | Flash |
| Astro and the Space Mutts | 1 | 11 | 1981 | NBC | Hanna-Barbera | | TV-Y7 | Traditional |
| Astroblast! | 2 | 52 | 2014–2015 | Sprout | Soup2Nuts | | TV-Y | Flash |
| Attack of the Killer Tomatoes | 1 | 21 | 1990–1991 | Fox Children's Network | Marvel Productions | | TV-Y7 | Traditional |
| Atom Ant | 2 | 26 | 1965–1968 | NBC | Hanna-Barbera | | TV-G | Traditional |
| Augie Doggie and Doggie Daddy | 3 | 45 | 1959–1962 | Syndication | Hanna-Barbera | | TV-G | Traditional |
| Auto-B-Good | 2 | 63 | 2005–2006 | Syndication | Wet Cement Productions; Gold King Media | | TV-Y | CGI |
| Avatar: Seven Havens | 1 | 13 | 2026–present | Paramount+ | Nickelodeon Animation Studios | | TV-PG | Traditional |
| Avatar: The Last Airbender | 3 | 61 | 2005–2008 | Nickelodeon | Nickelodeon Animation Studios | | TV-Y7 | Traditional |
| Avengers Assemble | 5 | 127 | 2013–2019 | Disney XD | Marvel Animation | | TV-Y7 | Traditional |
| Awesome Magical Tales | 1 | 26 | 2012–2013 | Hub Network | Home Plate Entertainment | Australian-Canadian-Irish-Mexican co-production | TV-Y7 | Flash |
| Axe Cop | 2 | 22 | 2013–2015 | Fox; FXX | ADHD Studios | | TV-14 | Traditional |

=== B ===
| Title | Seasons | Episodes | Year | Original channel | American company | Note | Age rating | Technique |
|---|---|---|---|---|---|---|---|---|
| Baby Blues | 1 | 13 | 2000–2002 | The WB | Split the Difference Productions | | TV-14 | Traditional |
| Baby Felix | 1 | 26 | 2000–2001 | NHK | Felix the Cat Productions | Japanese co-production | TV-Y | Traditional |
| Baby Looney Tunes | 4 | 53 | 2002–2005 | Kids' WB (season 1); Cartoon Network (season 2) | Warner Bros. Animation | | TV-Y | Traditional |
| Baby Shark's Big Show! | 3 | 91 | 2020–2025 | Nickelodeon | Nickelodeon Animation Studio | South Korean co-production | TV-Y | Flash |
| Back at the Barnyard | 2 | 52 | 2007–2011 | Nickelodeon | Omation Animation Studio; Nickelodeon Animation Studio | The last 6 episodes aired on Nicktoons in 2011. | TV-Y7 | CGI |
| Back to the Future | 1 | 26 | 1991–1992 | CBS | Universal Animation Studios | French co-production | TV-Y | Traditional |
| Bad Dog | 2 | 40 | 1998–2000 | Fox Family | Saban Entertainment | Canadian co-production | TV-Y | Traditional |
| Baggy Pants and the Nitwits | 1 | 13 | 1977 | NBC | DePatie–Freleng Enterprises | | —N/a | Traditional |
| Bailey's Comets | 1 | 32 | 1973–1974 | CBS | DePatie–Freleng Enterprises | | TV-G | Traditional |
| Ballmastrz: 9009 | 2 | 21 | 2018–2023 | Adult Swim | Williams Street | | TV-14 | Flash |
| Barbie Dreamhouse Adventures | 5 | 52 | 2018–2020 | Netflix | Mattel Television | Canadian co-production | TV-Y7 | CGI |
| Barbie: A Touch of Magic | 2 | 26 | 2023–2024 | Netflix | Mattel Television | | TV-Y7 | CGI |
| Barbie: It Takes Two | 2 | 26 | 2022 | Netflix | Mattel Television | Canadian co-production | TV-Y7 | CGI |
| Barbie: Life in the Dreamhouse | 4 | 75 | 2012–2018 | YouTube | Mattel Television | Canadian co-production | TV-Y7 | CGI |
| Barbie Mysteries | 1 | 8 | 2024–present | Netflix | Mattel Television | | TV-Y7 | CGI |
| Barker Bill's Cartoon Show | 2 | 52 | 1953–1955 | CBS | Terrytoons | | —N/a | Traditional |
| Barney's World | 1 | 52 | 2024–present | Cartoonito | Mattel Television | Canadian co-production | TV-Y | CGI |
| Barnyard Commandos | 1 | 4 | 1990 | Syndication | Fred Wolf Films | French co-production | TV-Y7 | Traditional |
| Bat-Fam | 1 | 10 | 2025 | Amazon Prime Video | Warner Bros. Animation | | TV-Y7 | Traditional |
| Batfink | 1 | 100 | 1966–1967 | Syndication | Hal Seeger Productions | | —N/a | Traditional |
| Batman Beyond | 3 | 52 | 1999–2001 | Kids' WB | Warner Bros. Animation | | TV-Y7 | Traditional |
| Batman: Caped Crusader | 1 | 10 | 2024–present | Amazon Prime Video | Warner Bros. Animation; DC Entertainment | | TV-14 | Traditional |
| Batman: The Animated Series | 2 | 85 | 1992–1995 | Fox Kids | Warner Bros. Animation | | TV-Y7 | Traditional |
| Batman: The Brave and the Bold | 3 | 65 | 2008–2011 | Cartoon Network | Warner Bros. Animation; DC Entertainment | | TV-Y7 | Traditional |
| Battle Kitty | 1 | 9 | 2022 | Netflix | Netflix Animation | | TV-Y7 | CGI |
| Battle of the Planets | 1 | 85 | 1978–1980 | Syndication | Sandy Frank Entertainment | Japanese co-production | TV-Y7 | Traditional |
| BattleTech: The Animated Series | 1 | 13 | 1994 | Syndication | Saban Entertainment | | —N/a | Traditional |
| Batwheels | 2 | 77 | 2022–present | Cartoonito | Warner Bros. Animation; DC Entertainment | | TV-Y | CGI |
| Baymax! | 1 | 6 | 2022 | Disney+ | Walt Disney Animation Studios | | TV-Y7 | CGI |
| Be Cool, Scooby-Doo! | 2 | 52 | 2015–2018 | Cartoon Network; Boomerang | Warner Bros. Animation | | TV-Y7 | Traditional |
| Bea's Block | 1 | 20 | 2023–2024 | Cartoonito | Sesame Workshop | | TV-Y | CGI |
| Beany and Cecil | 1 | 26 | 1962 | ABC | Bob Clampett Productions | | —N/a | Traditional |
| Bearbrick | 1 | 13 | 2025–present | Apple TV+ | DreamWorks Animation Television | Japanese co-production | TV-G | CGI |
| Beast Machines: Transformers | 1 | 26 | 1999–2000 | Fox Kids | Hasbro | Canadian co-production | TV-Y7 | CGI |
| Beast Wars: Transformers | 3 | 52 | 1996–1999 | Syndication | Hasbro | Canadian co-production | TV-Y7 | CGI |
| Beavis and Butt-Head | 11 | 296 | 1993–present | MTV; Paramount+; Comedy Central | MTV Animation | | TV-14 | Traditional |
| Bee and PuppyCat: Lazy in Space | 1 | 16 | 2022 | Netflix | Frederator Studios | Japanese co-production | TV-14 | Traditional |
| Beethoven | 1 | 13 | 1994 | CBS | Universal Cartoon Studios | | TV-Y7 | Traditional |
| Beetlejuice | 4 | 94 | 1989–1991 | ABC Fox | Nelvana | Canadian co-production | TV-Y | Traditional |
| Ben 10 (2005) | 4 | 52 | 2005–2008 | Cartoon Network | Cartoon Network Studios | | TV-Y7 | Traditional |
| Ben 10 (2016) | 4 | 178 | 2017–2021 | Cartoon Network | Cartoon Network Studios | | TV-Y7 | Traditional |
| Ben 10: Alien Force | 3 | 46 | 2008–2010 | Cartoon Network | Cartoon Network Studios | | TV-Y7 | Traditional |
| Ben 10: Omniverse | 8 | 80 | 2012–2014 | Cartoon Network | Cartoon Network Studios | | TV-Y7 | Traditional |
| Ben 10: Ultimate Alien | 3 | 52 | 2010–2012 | Cartoon Network | Cartoon Network Studios | | TV-Y7 | Traditional |
| Bert and Ernie's Great Adventures | 2 | 52 | 2008–2010 | PBS Kids | Sesame Workshop | Italian co-production | TV-Y | Stop-Motion |
| Betsy's Kindergarten Adventures | 1 | 26 | 2008 | PBS Kids | Polkadot Productions | | TV-Y | Traditional |
| Between the Lions | 10 | 130 | 2000–2010 | PBS Kids | WGBH | | TV-Y | Traditional/Live-Action/Flash/CGI |
| Beverly Hills Teens | 1 | 65 | 1987 | Syndication | DIC Entertainment | Canadian co-production | TV-Y7 | Traditional |
| Bibleman (revival series) | 1 | 26 | 2016–2020 | Direct-to-video | Pamplin Entertainment | | —N/a | CGI |
| Big Bag | 2 | 39 | 1996–1998 | Cartoon Network | Children's Television Workshop | | TV-Y | Traditional/Live-Action |
| Big City Greens | 4 | 110 | 2018–present | Disney Channel | Disney Television Animation | | TV-Y7 | Traditional |
| Big Guy and Rusty the Boy Robot | 1 | 26 | 1999–2001 | Fox Kids | Adelaide Productions | | TV-Y7 | Traditional |
| Big Hero 6: The Series | 4 | 56 | 2017–2021 | Disney Channel | Disney Television Animation; Man of Action Entertainment | | TV-Y7 | Traditional |
| Big Mouth | 8 | 81 | 2017–2025 | Netflix | Titmouse, Inc. | | TV-MA | Traditional |
| Big Nate | 2 | 52 | 2022–2024 | Paramount+ | Nickelodeon Animation Studio | | TV-Y7 | CGI |
| Bigfoot and the Muscle Machines | 1 | 9 | 1985 | Syndication | Sunbow Entertainment | | —N/a | Traditional |
| Biker Mice from Mars (1993) | 3 | 65 | 1993–1996 | Syndication | New World Animation | | TV-Y7 | Traditional |
| Biker Mice from Mars (2006) | 1 | 28 | 2006–2007 | 4Kids TV | Brentwood Television Funnies | | TV-Y7 | Traditional |
| Bill & Ted's Excellent Adventures | 1 | 21 | 1990–1991 | CBS | Hanna-Barbera | Canadian co-production | TV-Y7 | Traditional |
| Bionic Six | 2 | 65 | 1987 | Syndication | MCA TV | Japanese co-production | TV-Y7 | Traditional |
| Birdgirl | 1 | 12 | 2021–2022 | Adult Swim | Williams Street | | TV-14 | Flash |
| Birdman and the Galaxy Trio | 1 | 20 | 1967–1968 | NBC | Hanna-Barbera | | TV-Y7 | Traditional |
| Black Dynamite | 2 | 20 | 2012–2015 | Adult Swim | Williams Street | | TV-MA | Traditional |
| Black Panther | 1 | 6 | 2010 | BET | Marvel Animation | | TV-14 | Traditional |
| Blade Runner: Black Lotus | 1 | 13 | 2021–2022 | Adult Swim | Alcon Entertainment | Japanese co-production | TV-14 | CGI |
| Blackstar | 1 | 13 | 1981 | CBS | Filmation | Japanese co-production | TV-Y7 | Traditional |
| Blast-Off Buzzard | 1 | 13 | 1977 | NBC | Hanna-Barbera | | TV-G | Traditional |
| Blaster's Universe | 1 | 13 | 1999–2000 | CBS | Knowledge Adventure | Canadian-Taiwanese co-production | TV-Y7 | Traditional |
| Blaze and the Monster Machines | 9 | 180 | 2014–2025 | Nickelodeon | Nickelodeon Animation Studio | Canadian co-production | TV-Y | CGI |
| Blazing Team: Masters of Yo Kwon Do | 2 | 42 | 2015–2017 | Discovery Family | Hasbro Studios | Chinese co-production | TV-Y7 | Traditional |
| Bless the Harts | 2 | 34 | 2019–2021 | Fox | Titmouse, Inc. | | TV-14 | Flash |
| Blippi Wonders | 1 | 28 | 2021–present | YouTube | Moonbug Entertainment | British co-production | TV-Y | CGI |
| Blood of Zeus | 3 | 24 | 2020–2025 | Netflix | Powerhouse Animation Studios | | TV-MA | Traditional |
| Blue Eye Samurai | 1 | 8 | 2023–present | Netflix | 3 Arts Entertainment | Canadian co-production | TV-MA | Traditional |
| Blue's Clues | 10 | 143 | 1996–2006 | Nickelodeon | Nickelodeon Animation Studio | | TV-Y | Flash/Live-Action |
| Blue's Clues & You! | 5 | 90 | 2019–2024 | Nickelodeon | Nickelodeon Animation Studio | Canadian co-production | TV-Y | CGI/Live-Action |
| Bob's Burgers | 16 | 304 | 2011–present | Fox | Bento Box Entertainment | | TV-14 | Flash |
| Bobby's World | 7 | 81 | 1990–1998 | Fox Kids | Film Roman | Canadian co-production | TV-Y | Traditional |
| BoJack Horseman | 6 | 77 | 2014–2020 | Netflix | ShadowMachine | | TV-MA | Flash |
| Bonkers | 4 | 65 | 1993–1994 | The Disney Channel; Syndication | Walt Disney Television Animation | | TV-Y | Traditional |
| Bordertown | 1 | 13 | 2016 | Fox | Fuzzy Door Productions | | TV-14 | Traditional |
| Bozo: The World's Most Famous Clown | 1 | 157 | 1958–1962 | Syndication | Larry Harmon Pictures | | —N/a | Traditional |
| Braingames | 1 | 6 | 1983–1985 | HBO | Eliot Noyes Productions | | —N/a | Traditional/Live-Action |
| Brad Neely's Harg Nallin' Sclopio Peepio | 1 | 10 | 2016 | Adult Swim | Williams Street | | TV-14 | Flash |
| Brandy & Mr. Whiskers | 2 | 39 | 2004–2006 | Disney Channel | Walt Disney Television Animation | | TV-G | Traditional |
| Brats of the Lost Nebula | 1 | 13 | 1998–1999 | Kids' WB | The Jim Henson Company | | TV-Y | CGI/Live-action |
| Bratz | 2 | 40 | 2005–2008 | Fox (4Kids TV) | Mike Young Productions | | TV-Y7 | CGI |
| Bravest Warriors | 4 | 82 | 2012–2018 | YouTube; VRV | Frederator Studios | Canadian co-production | TV-PG | Traditional |
| BraveStarr | 1 | 65 | 1987–1988 | Syndication | Filmation | | TV-Y7 | Traditional |
| Breadwinners | 2 | 40 | 2014–2016 | Nickelodeon | Nickelodeon Animation Studio | The last 11 episodes aired on Nicktoons in 2016. | TV-Y7 | Flash |
| Breaking Bear | 1 | 10 | 2026–present | Tubi | To The Stars Inc. | Canadian co-production | TV-MA | Traditional |
| Breezly and Sneezly | 1 | 23 | 1964–1965 | Syndication | Hanna-Barbera | | —N/a | Traditional |
| Brickleberry | 3 | 36 | 2012–2015 | Comedy Central | Damn! Show Productions | | TV-MA | Traditional |
| Britannica's Tales Around the World | 1 | 6 | 1991–1993 | Direct-to-video | Encyclopædia Britannica Films | | —N/a | Traditional |
| Bruno the Kid | 1 | 36 | 1996–1997 | Syndication | Film Roman | British-German co-production | TV-Y | Traditional |
| Bubble Guppies | 6 | 129 | 2011–2023 | Nickelodeon | Nickelodeon Animation Studio | Canadian co-production | TV-Y | CGI |
| Bucky and Pepito | 1 | 36 | 1959–1960 | Syndication | Trans-Artists Productions | | —N/a | Traditional |
| Bucky O'Hare and the Toad Wars! | 1 | 13 | 1991 | Syndication | Sunbow Entertainment | | —N/a | Traditional |
| Buddy Thunderstruck | 1 | 12 | 2017 | Netflix | Stoopid Buddy Stoodios; American Greetings | | TV-Y7 | Stop-Motion |
| Bug Bites | 1 | 26 | 2016 | PBS Kids | Bug Bites Productions, LLC | | TV-Y | Flash/Live-Action |
| Bugs Bunny Builders | 2 | 75 | 2022–present | Cartoonito | Warner Bros. Animation | | TV-Y | Traditional |
| Bugs 'n' Daffy | 2 | 130 | 1995–1996 | Kids' WB | Warner Bros. Animation | | —N/a | Traditional |
| Bugtime Adventures | 1 | 13 | 2004–2007 | TBN | Lightning Bug Flix | | TV-G | Traditional |
| Bump in the Night | 1 | 26 | 1994–1995 | ABC | Greengrass Productions | | TV-Y | Stop-Motion |
| Bunnicula | 2 | 104 | 2016–2018 | Cartoon Network; Boomerang | Warner Bros. Animation | | TV-Y7 | Flash |
| Bunsen Is a Beast | 1 | 26 | 2017–2018 | Nickelodeon | Billionfold Inc.; Nickelodeon Animation Studio | The last 10 episodes aired on Nicktoons. | TV-Y7 | Flash |
| Bureau of Alien Detectors | 1 | 13 | 1996 | UPN | Saban Entertainment | | TV-Y7 | Traditional |
| Butch Cassidy and the Sundance Kids | 1 | 13 | 1973 | NBC | Hanna-Barbera | | —N/a | Traditional |
| Butt-Ugly Martians | 1 | 26 | 2001–2003 | Nickelodeon | Mike Young Productions | British-Chinese co-production | TV-Y7 | CGI |
| Butterbean's Cafe | 2 | 60 | 2018–2020 | Nickelodeon | Nickelodeon Animation Studio | Irish co-production | TV-Y | CGI |
| Buzz Lightyear of Star Command | 1 | 62 | 2000–2001 | UPN; ABC | Walt Disney Television Animation; Pixar Animation Studios | | TV-Y7 | Traditional |

=== C ===
| Title | Seasons | Episodes | Year | Original channel | American company | Note | Age rating | Technique |
|---|---|---|---|---|---|---|---|---|
| C Bear and Jamal | 1 | 13 | 1996–1997 | Fox Kids | Film Roman | German co-production | TV-Y | Traditional |
| Cadillacs and Dinosaurs | 1 | 13 | 1993–1994 | CBS | Nelvana | Canadian co-production | TV-Y7 | Traditional |
| Cake | 5 | 47 | 2019–2021 | FXX | SLQAR | | TV-MA | Flash/Live-Action |
| Calls | 1 | 5 | 2021 | Apple TV | Good Universe | French co-production | TV-MA | Traditional |
| Calliope | 1 | 78 | 1978–1993 | USA Network | Buzzco Associates | | —N/a | Traditional/Live-Action |
| Calvin and the Colonel | 1 | 26 | 1961–1962, 1964–1965 | ABC | Kayro Productions | | —N/a | Traditional |
| Camp Camp | 4 | 64 | 2016–2024 | YouTube | Rooster Teeth | | TV-MA | Flash |
| Camp Candy | 2 | 39 | 1989–1992 | NBC; Syndication | DIC Entertainment | Canadian co-production | TV-Y | Traditional |
| Camp Lazlo | 5 | 61 | 2005–2008 | Cartoon Network | Cartoon Network Studios | | TV-Y7 | Traditional |
| Camp WWE | 2 | 10 | 2016–2018 | WWE Network | Stoopid Buddy Stoodios | | TV-14 | Traditional |
| Can You Teach My Alligator Manners? | 1 | 20 | 2008–2010 | Playhouse Disney | OddBot Inc. | | TV-Y | Flash |
| Capitol Critters | 1 | 13 | 1992–1996 | CBS | Hanna-Barbera | | TV-PG | Traditional |
| Capt'n Sailorbird | 1 | 190 | 1959–1960 | Syndication | Magic Screen Pictures Inc. | | —N/a | Traditional |
| Captain Caveman and the Teen Angels | 1 | 20 | 1978–1979 | ABC | Hanna-Barbera | | TV-G | Traditional |
| Captain Fathom | 1 | 26 | 1965 | Syndication | Cambria Productions | | —N/a | Traditional |
| Captain Harlock and the Queen of a Thousand Years | 1 | 65 | 1986 | Syndication | Harmony Gold USA | Japanese co-production | —N/a | Traditional |
| Captain Kangaroo | 29 | 6,090 | 1955–1984; 1997–2000 | CBS | Robert Keeshan Associates | | TV-G | Traditional/Live-action |
| Captain Laserhawk: A Blood Dragon Remix | 1 | 10 | 2023 | Netflix | Ubisoft Film & Television | French co-production | TV-MA | Traditional |
| Captain N: The Game Master | 3 | 34 | 1989–1991 | NBC | DIC Entertainment | Canadian co-production | TV-Y7 | Traditional |
| Captain Planet and the Planeteers | 6 | 113 | 1990–1996 | TBS | DIC Entertainment; Hanna-Barbera | | TV-Y7 | Traditional |
| Captain Simian & the Space Monkeys | 1 | 26 | 1996–1997 | Syndication | Monkeyshine Productions, Inc. | | TV-Y7 | Traditional |
| Care Bears | 1 | 11 | 1985 | Syndication | DIC Entertainment | Canadian co-production | TV-Y | Traditional |
| Care Bears & Cousins | 1 | 12 | 2015–2016 | Netflix | Splash Entertainment; American Greetings | | TV-Y | CGI |
| Care Bears: Adventures in Care-a-lot | 1 | 26 | 2007–2008 | CBS | SD Entertainment | | TV-Y | Traditional |
| Care Bears: Unlock the Magic | 1 | 49 | 2019–2020 | Boomerang | Cloudco Entertainment | Canadian co-production | TV-Y | Flash |
| Care Bears: Welcome to Care-a-Lot | 1 | 26 | 2012 | The Hub | MoonScoop Entertainment; American Greetings | | TV-Y | CGI |
| Carl the Collector | 1 | 26 | 2024–present | PBS Kids | Spiffy Pictures | | TV-Y | Toon Boom Harmony |
| Carmen Sandiego | 3 | 19 | 2019–2021 | Netflix | Top Draw Animation | Canadian co-production | TV-Y7 | Flash |
| Carol & The End of The World | 1 | 10 | 2023 | Netflix | Bardel Entertainment | Canadian co-production | TV-14 | Flash |
| Cars on the Road | 1 | 9 | 2022 | Disney+ | Pixar Animation Studios | | TV-G | CGI |
| Cars Toons | 1 | 15 | 2008–2014 | Disney Channel | Pixar Animation Studios | | TV-G | CGI |
| Cartoon Alley | 1 | 47 | 2004–2007 | Turner Classic Movies | | | TV-G | Traditional |
| Cartoon Planet | 3 | 146 | 1995–1998, 2012–2014 | TBS; Cartoon Network | | | TV-Y7 | Traditional (season 1)/Flash (season 2-3) |
| Cartoon Sushi | 1 | 15 | 1997–1998 | MTV | MTV Animation | Canadian co-production | TV-14 | Traditional/Stop-Motion/CGI/Flash |
| Casper and the Angels | 1 | 13 | 1979 | NBC | Hanna-Barbera | | —N/a | Traditional |
| Casper's Scare School | 2 | 52 | 2009–2012 | Cartoon Network | The Harvey Entertainment Company | French-Indian co-production | TV-Y7 | CGI |
| Castlevania | 3 | 32 | 2017–2021 | Netflix | Frederator Studios | | TV-MA | Traditional |
| Castlevania: Nocturne | 1 | 8 | 2023–present | Netflix | Frederator Studios | | TV-MA | Traditional |
| CatDog | 3 | 68 | 1998–2005 | Nickelodeon | Peter Hannan Productions; Nickelodeon Animation Studio | | TV-Y | Traditional |
| Catscratch | 1 | 20 | 2005–2007 | Nickelodeon | Nickelodeon Animation Studio | | TV-Y7 | Traditional |
| Cattanooga Cats | 1 | 17 | 1969–1971 | ABC | Hanna-Barbera | | TV-G | Traditional |
| Cave Kids | 1 | 8 | 1996 | Syndication | Hanna-Barbera | | TV-G | Traditional |
| CB Bears | 1 | 13 | 1977 | NBC | Hanna-Barbera | | TV-G | Traditional |
| CBS Storybreak | 3 | 26 | 1985–1989 | CBS | CBS Productions | Australian co-production | TV-Y7 | Traditional |
| Celebrity Deathmatch | 6 | 93 | 1998–2002, 2006–2007 | MTV, MTV2 | Fogelmania Productions; MTV Animation | Canadian co-production | TV-14 | Stop-Motion |
| Centaurworld | 1 | 18 | 2021 | Netflix | Netflix Animation | | TV-Y7 | Traditional |
| Central Park | 3 | 39 | 2020–2022 | Apple TV+ | Wilo Productions | | TV-14 | Flash |
| Centurions | 1 | 65 | 1986 | Syndication | Ruby-Spears Enterprises | | TV-Y7 | Traditional |
| Ceasar and Chuy | 1 | 26 | 2007 | LATV | Overman Productions | | TV-14 | Flash |
| ChalkZone | 4 | 40 | 2002–2008 | Nickelodeon | Frederator Studios | | TV-Y | Traditional |
| Challenge of the GoBots | 2 | 65 | 1984–1985 | Syndication | Hanna-Barbera | | TV-Y7 | Traditional |
| Challenge of the Superfriends | 1 | 16 | 1978 | ABC | Hanna-Barbera | | TV-Y7 | Traditional |
| Channel Umptee-3 | 1 | 13 | 1997–1998 | Kids' WB | Adelaide Productions | | TV-Y | Traditional |
| Chaotic | 3 | 79 | 2006–2010 | Fox (4Kids TV) | 4Kids Entertainment | Canadian co-production (season 1 only) | TV-Y7 | Traditional |
| Charlie's Colorforms City | 6 | 34 | 2019–2022 | Netflix | 9 Story USA | Canadian co-production | TV-Y | CGI |
| Charlotte's Web | 1 | 3 | 2025 | HBO Max | Sesame Workshop | | TV-G | CGI |
| Chibiverse | 1 | 4 | 2022–present | Disney Channel | Disney Television Animation | | TV-Y7 | Traditional |
| Chicago Party Aunt | 1 | 16 | 2021–2022 | Netflix | Titmouse, Inc. | | TV-MA | Flash |
| Chico Bon Bon: Monkey with a Tool Belt | 4 | 38 | 2020 | Netflix | Silvergate Media | British-Irish co-production | TV-Y | CGI |
| China, IL | 3 | 30 | 2011–2015 | Adult Swim | Williams Street | | TV-14 | Flash |
| Chip Chilla | 2 | 24 | 2023–2024 | Bentkey | Matchbox Hero | | TV-Y | Traditional |
| Chip 'n Dale: Rescue Rangers | 3 | 65 | 1989–1990 | Syndication | Walt Disney Television Animation | | TV-Y | Traditional |
| Chip 'N Dale's Nutty Tales | 2 | 18 | 2017–2019 | Disney Junior | Disney Television Animation | | TV-Y | CGI |
| Chloe's Closet | 2 | 52 | 2009–2014 | Sprout | MoonScoop Entertainment | British co-production | TV-Y | Flash |
| Chowder | 3 | 49 | 2007–2010 | Cartoon Network | Cartoon Network Studios | | TV-Y7 | Traditional |
| Chozen | 1 | 10 | 2014 | FX | Floyd County Productions | | TV-MA | Flash |
| Cita's World | 2 | 26 | 1999–2003 | BET | | | TV-14 | CGI |
| City Island | 2 | 31 | 2022–present | PBS Kids | Augenblick Studios | | TV-Y | Flash |
| City of Ghosts | 1 | 6 | 2021 | Netflix | Netflix Animation | French co-production | TV-Y7 | CGI |
| Clarence | 3 | 130 | 2014–2018 | Cartoon Network | Cartoon Network Studios | | TV-PG | Traditional |
| Class of 3000 | 2 | 27 | 2006–2008 | Cartoon Network | Cartoon Network Studios | | TV-Y7 | Traditional |
| Classical Baby | 1 | 6 | 2005 | HBO Family | MaGiK World Animation | | TV-Y | Flash/Traditional/CGI |
| Cleopatra in Space | 3 | 24 | 2020–2022 | Hulu; Peacock | DreamWorks Animation Television | | TV-Y7 | Flash |
| Clerks: The Animated Series | 1 | 6 | 2000–2002 | ABC | View Askew Productions | | TV-14 | Traditional |
| Click and Clack's As the Wrench Turns | 1 | 10 | 2008 | PBS | Howard K. Grossman Productions | | TV-G | Traditional |
| Clifford the Big Red Dog (2000) | 2 | 66 | 2000–2003 | PBS Kids | Scholastic Corporation | | TV-Y | Traditional |
| Clifford the Big Red Dog (2019) | 1 | 39 | 2019–2021 | PBS Kids; Amazon Prime Video | Scholastic Entertainment | Canadian co-production | TV-Y | Flash |
| Clifford's Puppy Days | 2 | 39 | 2003–2006 | PBS Kids | Scholastic Corporation | | TV-Y | Traditional |
| Clone High | 2 | 23 | 2002–2003, 2023–2024 | MTV; Max | MTV Animation (season 1); ShadowMachine (seasons 2-3) | Canadian co-production (season 1 only) | TV-14 | Traditional (season 1)/Flash (season 2) |
| Close Enough | 3 | 24 | 2020–2022 | HBO Max | Cartoon Network Studios | | TV-14 | Traditional |
| Cloudy with a Chance of Meatballs | 2 | 52 | 2017–2018 | Cartoon Network | Sony Pictures Animation | Canadian co-production | TV-Y7 | Flash |
| Clue Club | 1 | 16 | 1976 | CBS | Hanna-Barbera | | TV-G | Traditional |
| Clutch Cargo | 1 | 52 | 1959–1960 | Syndication | Cambria Productions | | —N/a | Traditional |
| Cocomelon | | 80 | 2020–present | YouTube | Treasure Studio | British co-production | TV-Y | CGI |
| Cocomelon Lane | 3 | 30 | 2023–present | Netflix | Moonbug Entertainment | Canadian co-production | TV-Y | CGI |
| Coconut Fred's Fruit Salad Island! | 2 | 13 | 2005–2006 | Kids' WB | Warner Bros. Animation | Canadian co-production | TV-Y7 | Flash |
| Code Monkeys | 1 | 26 | 2007–2008 | G4 | Monkey Wrangler Productions | | TV-14 | Flash |
| Codename: Kids Next Door | 6 | 81 | 2002–2008 | Cartoon Network | Curious Pictures | | TV-Y7 | Traditional |
| Colonel Bleep | 1 | 100 | 1957–1960 | Syndication | Richard M. Ullcan Inc. | | —N/a | Traditional |
| Commander McBragg | 1 | 48 | 1964–1966 | CBS | Total Television | | —N/a | Traditional |
| Common Side Effects | 1 | 2 | 2025-present | Adult Swim | Bandera Entertainment | | TV-MA | Flash |
| Conan and the Young Warriors | 1 | 13 | 1994 | CBS | Sunbow Entertainment | | —N/a | Traditional |
| Conan the Adventurer | 2 | 65 | 1992–1993 | Syndication | Sunbow Entertainment | Canadian-French co-production | TV-Y7 | Traditional |
| Constantine: City of Demons | 1 | 2 | 2018–2019 | CW Seed | Warner Bros. Animation; DC Entertainment | | TV-14 | Traditional |
| Cool McCool | 1 | 20 | 1966–1967 | NBC | King Features Entertainment | Australian co-production | TV-Y7 | Traditional |
| COPS | 1 | 65 | 1988 | Syndication | DIC Entertainment | Canadian co-production | TV-Y7 | Traditional |
| Cosmic Quantum Ray | 1 | 26 | 2007–2008 | Animalia HD; The Hub | MoonScoop Entertainment | French-German co-production | TV-Y7 | CGI |
| Costume Quest | 1 | 14 | 2019 | Amazon Prime Video | Amazon Studios | | TV-Y7 | Flash |
| Courage the Cowardly Dog | 4 | 52 | 1999–2002 | Cartoon Network | Stretch Films | | TV-Y7 | Traditional |
| Courageous Cat and Minute Mouse | 1 | 130 | 1960–1962 | Syndication | Trans-Artists Productions | | —N/a | Traditional |
| Cow and Chicken | 4 | 52 | 1997–1999 | Cartoon Network | Hanna-Barbera | | TV-Y7 | Traditional |
| Craig of the Creek | 6 | 180 | 2018–2025 | Cartoon Network | Cartoon Network Studios | | TV-Y7 | Traditional |
| Crashbox | 2 | 52 | 1999–2000 | HBO Family | Cuppa Coffee Animation | Canadian co-production | TV-Y | Stop-Motion |
| Creative Galaxy | 3 | 36 | 2013–2019 | Amazon Prime Video | Amazon Studios; 9 Story USA | Canadian co-production | TV-Y | CGI |
| Creature Comforts | 1 | 7 | 2007 | CBS | Gotham Group | British co-production. Season 3 only. | TV-14 | Stop-motion |
| Creature Commandos | 1 | 13 | 2024–present | Max | DC Studios; Warner Bros. Animation | | TV-14 | Traditional |
| Creepy Crawlers | 2 | 23 | 1994–1996 | Syndication | Sunbow Entertainment | French co-production | TV-Y7 | Traditional |
| Cro | 2 | 21 | 1993–1994 | ABC | Film Roman | | TV-Y | Traditional |
| Crossing Swords | 2 | 20 | 2020–2021 | Hulu | Stoopid Buddy Stoodios | | TV-14 | Stop-Motion |
| Crusader Rabbit | 3 | 455 | 1950–1959 | Syndication | Television Arts Productions | First children's animated television series. | —N/a | Traditional |
| Cubix | 2 | 26 | 2001–2004 | Kids' WB | Konami Cross Media NY | South Korean co-production | TV-Y7 | CGI |
| Curiosity Shop | 1 | 17 | 1971–1972 | ABC | Sandler-Burns-Marmer Productions | | —N/a | Traditional/Live-action |
| Curious George (1982) | 1 | 100 | 1982 | Nickelodeon | Atkinson Film-Arts | Canadian co-production | TV-Y | Traditional |
| Curious George (2006) | 10 | 198 | 2006–2022 | PBS Kids; Peacock | Universal Animation Studios | | TV-Y | Traditional |
| Curses! | 2 | 20 | 2023–2024 | Apple TV+ | DreamWorks Animation Television | | TV-G | CGI |
| Cyberchase | 15 | 148 | 2002–present | PBS Kids (2002–2004, 2013-present); PBS Kids Go! (2004–2013) | WNET Thirteen | Canadian co-production | TV-Y | Traditional/Digital ink-and-paint (seasons 1-5)/Flash/Adobe Flash (season 6-present) |

=== D ===
| Title | Seasons | Episodes | Year | Original channel | American company | Note | Age rating | Technique |
|---|---|---|---|---|---|---|---|---|
| D-TV | 1 | 240 | 1984–1989 | The Disney Channel | The Walt Disney Company | | —N/a | Traditional |
| Da Boom Crew | 1 | 4 | 2004 | Kids' WB | Jambalaya Studios | Canadian-German co-production | TV-Y7 | Traditional |
| Da Jammies | 1 | 13 | 2015 | Netflix | Toon Farm Animation LLC. | Canadian co-production | TV-Y7 | CGI |
| Dallas & Robo | 1 | 8 | 2018 | YouTube Premium | ShadowMachine | | —N/a | Flash |
| Dan Vs. | 3 | 53 | 2011–2013 | The Hub | Film Roman | | TV-PG | Flash |
| Danger & Eggs | 1 | 13 | 2017 | Amazon Video | PUNY | | TV-G | Traditional |
| Danger Rangers | 1 | 16 | 2005–2006 | PBS Kids | Educational Adventures | | TV-Y | Traditional |
| Daniel Spellbound | 2 | 20 | 2022–2023 | Netflix | Netflix Animation | Canadian co-production | TV-Y7 | CGI |
| Daniel Tiger's Neighborhood | 7 | 152 | 2012–present | PBS Kids | Fred Rogers Productions | Canadian co-production | TV-Y | Flash |
| Danny Phantom | 3 | 53 | 2004–2007 | Nickelodeon | Billionfold Inc.; Nickelodeon Animation Studio | | TV-Y7 | Traditional |
| Daria | 5 | 65 | 1997–2002 | MTV | MTV Animation | | TV-PG | Traditional |
| Darkstalkers | 1 | 13 | 1995 | Syndication | Graz Entertainment | | TV-Y7 | Traditional |
| Darkwing Duck | 3 | 91 | 1991–1992 | ABC | Walt Disney Television Animation | | TV-Y7 | Traditional |
| Dastardly and Muttley in Their Flying Machines | 1 | 17 | 1969–1970 | CBS | Hanna-Barbera | | TV-G | Traditional |
| Dave the Barbarian | 1 | 21 | 2004–2005 | Disney Channel | Walt Disney Television Animation | | TV-G | Traditional |
| Davey and Goliath | 5 | 73 | 1961–1973 | Syndication | Chokey Productions | | TV-G | Stop-Motion |
| Dawn of the Croods | 4 | 52 | 2015–2017 | Netflix | DreamWorks Animation Television | | TV-Y7 | Traditional |
| DC Nation Shorts | 1 | 162 | 2011–2014 | Cartoon Network | Warner Bros. Animation; DC Entertainment | | TV-PG | Flash/Traditional |
| DC Super Hero Girls (2015) | 5 | 112 | 2015–2018 | YouTube | Warner Bros. Animation; DC Entertainment | | TV-Y7 | Traditional |
| DC Super Hero Girls (2019) | 2 | 78 | 2019–2021 | Cartoon Network | Warner Bros. Animation; DC Entertainment | | TV-Y7 | Flash |
| Dead End: Paranormal Park | 1 | 20 | 2022 | Netflix | Netflix Animation | British co-production | TV-Y7 | Traditional |
| Deathstroke: Knights & Dragons | 1 | 2 | 2020 | CW Seed | Warner Bros. Animation; DC Entertainment | | TV-MA | Traditional |
| Decisive Battles | 1 | 13 | 2004 | History Channel | | | TV-MA | Flash |
| Dee & Friends in Oz | 1 | 16 | 2024–present | Netflix | Brown Bag Films | Canadian co-production | TV-Y | CGI |
| Defenders of the Earth | 1 | 65 | 1986–1987 | Syndication | Marvel Productions | | TV-Y7 | Traditional |
| Dennis the Menace | 3 | 78 | 1986–1988 | Syndication | DIC Entertainment | Canadian-French co-production | TV-G | Traditional |
| Denver, the Last Dinosaur | 1 | 50 | 1988 | Syndication | World Events Productions | French co-production | TV-G | Traditional |
| Descendants: Wicked World | 3 | 33 | 2015–2017 | Disney Channel | Disney Television Animation | Canadian co-production | TV-Y7 | CGI |
| Detention | 1 | 13 | 1999–2000 | Kids' WB | Warner Bros. Animation | | TV-Y | Traditional |
| Devil May Care | 1 | 7 | 2021 | Syfy | Psyop | | TV-MA | Flash |
| Devil May Cry | 1 | 8 | 2025–present | Netflix | Studio Mir | South Korean co-production | TV-MA | Traditional |
| Devlin | 1 | 16 | 1974 | ABC | Hanna-Barbera | | TV-G | Traditional |
| Dew Drop Diaries | 2 | 40 | 2023 | Netflix | DreamWorks Animation Television | | TV-Y | CGI |
| Dexter's Laboratory | 6 | 78 | 1996–2003 | Cartoon Network | Hanna-Barbera; Cartoon Network Studios | | TV-G | Traditional |
| Diabolik | 1 | 40 | 1999–2001 | Fox Kids | Sunbow Entertainment | French-Italian co-production | TV-Y7 | Traditional |
| Dick Figures | 6 | 54 | 2010–2015 | YouTube | 6 Point Harness | | TV-14 | Flash |
| Dicktown | 1 | 20 | 2020–2022 | FXX | Floyd County Productions | | TV-MA | Flash |
| Digman! | 2 | 16 | 2023–present | Comedy Central | Titmouse, Inc. | | TV-MA | Flash |
| Dilbert | 3 | 30 | 1999–2000 | UPN | Adelaide Productions; Idbox | | TV-PG | Traditional |
| Dink, the Little Dinosaur | 1 | 21 | 1989–1990 | CBS | Ruby-Spears Enterprises | | TV-Y | Traditional |
| Dinky Dog | 1 | 16 | 1980 | CBS | Hanna-Barbera | Australian co-production | —N/a | Traditional |
| Dino Babies | 2 | 26 | 1994–1996 | Fox Family | Fred Wolf Films | British-Canadian-Irish co-production | TV-Y | Traditional |
| Dino Girl Gauko | 2 | 39 | 2019–2020 | Netflix | | Filipino-Japanese-Singaporean co-production | TV-Y7 | Traditional |
| Dinosaucers | 1 | 65 | 1987 | Syndication | DIC Entertainment | Canadian co-production | TV-Y7 | Traditional |
| Dinosaur Train | 5 | 100 | 2009–2020 | PBS Kids | The Jim Henson Company | Canadian-Singaporean co-production | TV-Y | CGI |
| DinoSquad | 2 | 26 | 2007–2008 | CBS | DIC Entertainment | | TV-Y7 | Traditional |
| Dinotrux | 6 | 78 | 2015–2018 | Netflix | DreamWorks Animation Television | | TV-Y7 | CGI |
| Dinozaurs | 1 | 26 | 2000 | Fox Kids | Saban Entertainment | Japanese co-production | TV-Y7 | Traditional |
| Dino-Riders | 1 | 14 | 1988 | Syndication | Marvel Productions | | TV-Y7 | Traditional |
| Disenchantment | 3 | 50 | 2018–2023 | Netflix | The ULULU Company | | TV-14 | Traditional |
| Disney anthology television series | 58 | N/A | 1954–83; 1985-present | ABC; CBS; NBC | Walt Disney Productions | Various episodes were live-action only. Large majority of animated episodes on the anthlogy series was created prior to 1985. | TV-G/TV-PG | Traditional/CGI/Live-action |
| DJ & the Fro | 1 | 12 | 2009 | MTV | MTV Animation | | TV-14 | Flash |
| Doc McStuffins | 5 | 136 | 2012–2020 | Disney Junior | Brown Bag Films | | TV-Y | CGI |
| Doctor Dolittle | 1 | 17 | 1970–1971 | NBC | DePatie–Freleng Enterprises | | —N/a | Traditional |
| Dog City | 2 | 31 | 1992–1994 | Fox Kids | The Jim Henson Company | Canadian co-production | TV-Y | Traditional/Live-Action |
| Dogs in Space | 2 | 20 | 2021–2022 | Netflix | Netflix Animation | Canadian co-production | TV-Y7 | Traditional |
| Domo TV | 1 | 26 | 2008–2009 | Nicktoons Network | | Japanese co-production | TV-Y7 | Stop-Motion |
| Donald Duck Presents | 1 | 71 | 1983–1992 | The Disney Channel | Walt Disney Productions | | —N/a | Traditional |
| Donald's Quack Attack | 1 | 94 | 1992–1997 | The Disney Channel | Walt Disney Productions | | —N/a | Traditional |
| Doomlands | 2 | 15 | 2022–2024 | The Roku Channel | Look Mom! Productions | Canadian co-production | TV-14 | Flash |
| Do, Re & Mi | 1 | 26 | 2021–2022 | Amazon Prime Video | Michael Made Me | French co-production | TV-Y | CGI |
| Dora | 4 | 104 | 2024–present | Paramount+ | Nickelodeon Animation Studio | Canadian co-production | TV-Y | CGI |
| Dora and Friends: Into the City! | 2 | 38 | 2014–2017 | Nickelodeon | Nickelodeon Animation Studio | | TV-Y | Traditional |
| Dora the Explorer | 8 | 177 | 2000–2019 | Nickelodeon | Nickelodeon Animation Studio | | TV-Y | Traditional |
| Dorothy and the Wizard of Oz | 3 | 60 | 2017–2020 | Boomerang | Warner Bros. Animation | | TV-Y7 | Traditional |
| Dot. | 2 | 78 | 2016–2018 | Universal Kids | The Jim Henson Company | Canadian co-production | TV-Y | Flash |
| Dota: Dragon's Blood | 1 | 24 | 2021–2022 | Netflix | Kaiju Boulevard | South Korean co-production | TV-MA | Traditional |
| Double Dragon | 1 | 26 | 1993–1994 | Syndication | DIC Entertainment | Italian co-production | —N/a | Traditional |
| Doug | 7 | 117 | 1991–1999 | Nickelodeon (Seasons 1–4); ABC (Seasons 5–7) | Jumbo Pictures; Games Animation (seasons 1–4); Walt Disney Television Animation (seasons 5–7) | French co-production (seasons 2-4) | TV-Y | Traditional |
| Doug Unplugs | 2 | 26 | 2020–2022 | Apple TV+ | DreamWorks Animation Television | | TV-Y | CGI |
| Downtown | 1 | 13 | 1999 | MTV | MTV Animation | | TV-14 | Traditional |
| Dr. Henry's Emergency Lessons for People | 1 | 8 | 1979–1980 | ABC | | | —N/a | Traditional |
| Dragon Age: Absolution | 1 | 6 | 2022 | Netflix | Red Dog Culture House | Canadian-South Korean co-production | TV-MA | Traditional |
| Dragon Flyz | 1 | 26 | 1996–1997 | Syndication | Abrams/Gentile Entertainment | French co-production | TV-Y7 | Traditional |
| Dragon Striker | 1 | 11 | 2026–present | Disney XD | Disney Television Animation | French co-production | TV-Y7 | Traditional |
| Dragon Tales | 3 | 94 | 1999–2005 | PBS Kids | Sesame Workshop | Canadian co-production | TV-Y | Traditional |
| Dragon's Lair | 1 | 13 | 1984 | ABC | Ruby-Spears Enterprises | | TV-Y7 | Traditional |
| Drak Pack | 1 | 16 | 1980 | CBS | Hanna-Barbera | Australian co-production | —N/a | Traditional |
| Drawn Together | 3 | 36 | 2004–2007 | Comedy Central | Comedy Partners; Double Hemm | | TV-MA | Traditional |
| Dream Corp LLC | 3 | 28 | 2016–2020 | Adult Swim | Williams Street | | TV-14 | Traditional/Live-Action |
| Dream Productions | 1 | 4 | 2024 | Disney+ | Pixar Animation Studios | | TV-G | CGI |
| DreamWorks Dragons | 8 | 118 | 2012–2018 | Cartoon Network; Netflix | DreamWorks Animation Television | | TV-PG | CGI |
| DreamWorks Dragons: Rescue Riders | 6 | 53 | 2019–2022 | Netflix; Peacock | DreamWorks Animation Television | | TV-Y | CGI |
| DreamWorks Dragons: The Nine Realms | 8 | 52 | 2021–2023 | Hulu; Peacock | DreamWorks Animation Television | | TV-Y7 | CGI |
| Droopy, Master Detective | 1 | 39 | 1993 | Fox Kids | Hanna-Barbera | | TV-G | Traditional |
| Dr. Katz, Professional Therapist | 6 | 81 | 1995–2002 | Comedy Central | Tom Snyder Productions | | TV-14 | Traditional |
| Dr. Seuss's Red Fish, Blue Fish | 1 | 5 | 2025 | Netflix | Atomic Cartoons | Canadian co-production | TV-Y | Flash |
| Duck & Goose | 2 | 17 | 2022–2023 | Apple TV+ | Titmouse, Inc. | | TV-Y | Traditional |
| Duck Dodgers | 3 | 39 | 2003–2005 | Cartoon Network | Warner Bros. Animation | | TV-Y7 | Traditional |
| Duckman | 4 | 70 | 1994–1997 | USA Network | Klasky Csupo | | TV-PG | Traditional |
| DuckTales (1987) | 4 | 100 | 1987–1990 | Syndication | Walt Disney Television Animation | | TV-Y | Traditional |
| DuckTales (2017) | 3 | 69 | 2017–2021 | Disney XD (2017, 2020-21); Disney Channel (2018-19) | Disney Television Animation | | TV-Y7 | Traditional |
| Dug Days | 1 | 5 | 2021 | Disney+ | Pixar Animation Studios | | TV-G | CGI |
| Dumb and Dumber | 1 | 13 | 1995–1996 | ABC | Hanna-Barbera | | TV-Y7 | Traditional |
| Duncanville | 3 | 36 | 2020–2022 | Fox | Paper Kite Productions | The last 6 episodes aired on Hulu. | TV-14 | Traditional |
| Dungeons & Dragons | 3 | 27 | 1983–1985 | CBS | Marvel Productions | | TV-Y7 | Traditional |
| Dynomutt, Dog Wonder | 1 | 20 | 1976–1977 | ABC | Hanna-Barbera | | TV-G | Traditional |

=== E ===
| Title | Seasons | Episodes | Year | Original channel | American company | Note | Age rating | Technique |
|---|---|---|---|---|---|---|---|---|
| Eagle Riders | 1 | 26 | 1996–1997 | Syndication | Saban Entertainment | Japanese co-production | TV-Y7 | Traditional |
| Earth to Luna! | 8 | 208 | 2014–2023 | Sprout | Little Airplane Productions (seasons 1-2) | Brazilian co-production. Seasons 1-2 only. | TV-Y | Flash |
| Earthworm Jim | 1 | 23 | 1995–1996 | Kids' WB | Universal Cartoon Studios | | TV-Y | Traditional |
| Ed, Edd n Eddy | 6 | 69 | 1999–2009 | Cartoon Network | a.k.a. Cartoon | Canadian co-production | TV-Y7 | Traditional |
| Edgar & Ellen | 1 | 26 | 2007–2008 | Nicktoons Network | Star Farm Productions | Canadian co-production | TV-Y7 | Flash |
| Eek! The Cat | 3 | 75 | 1992–1997 | Fox Kids | Film Roman | Canadian co-production | TV-Y | Traditional |
| El Deafo | 1 | 3 | 2022 | Amazon Prime Video | Lighthouse Studios | | TV-Y | Flash |
| El Tigre: The Adventures of Manny Rivera | 1 | 26 | 2007–2008 | Nickelodeon | Nickelodeon Animation Studio | Mexican co-production. The last 4 episodes aired on Nicktoons Network. | TV-Y7 | Flash |
| Elena of Avalor | 3 | 77 | 2016–2020 | Disney Junior | Disney Television Animation | | TV-Y | CGI |
| Elinor Wonders Why | 2 | 60 | 2020–present | PBS Kids | Pipeline Studios | Canadian co-production | TV-Y | Flash |
| Ellen's Acres | 1 | 26 | 2007 | Cartoon Network | Animation Collective | 26 episodes were left unaired. | TV-Y | Flash |
| Eloise: The Animated Series | 1 | 13 | 2006 | Starz Kids & Family | Film Roman | | TV-G | Traditional |
| Emergency +4 | 1 | 23 | 1973–1974 | NBC | Fred Calvert Productions | | —N/a | Traditional |
| Epithet Erased | 1 | 7 | 2019 | VRV | Powerhouse Animation Studios | | TV-PG | Flash |
| Esme & Roy | 2 | 52 | 2018–2021 | HBO | Sesame Workshop | Canadian co-production | TV-Y | Flash |
| Eureka! | 1 | 30 | 2022–2023 | Disney Junior | Brown Bag Films | | TV-Y | CGI |
| Ever After High | 5 | 17 | 2015–2016 | Netflix | Mattel Television | Canadian co-production | TV-Y7 | Traditional |
| Everybody Still Hates Chris | 1 | 10 | 2024–present | Netflix | Titmouse, Inc | | TV-14 | Flash |
| Evil Con Carne | 1 | 13 | 2001–2004 | Cartoon Network | Cartoon Network Studios | | TV-Y7 | Traditional |
| Ewoks | 1 | 26 | 1985–1986 | ABC | Lucasfilm | Canadian co-production | TV-Y7 | Traditional |
| Exosquad | 2 | 52 | 1993–1994 | Syndication | Universal Cartoon Studios | | TV-Y7 | Traditional |
| Exploding Kittens | 1 | 9 | 2024 | Netflix | Bandera Entertainment | Canadian co-production | TV-MA | Flash |
| Exposure | 1 | 20 | 2000–2002 | Sci Fi Channel | | | —N/a | Traditional |
| Extreme Dinosaurs | 1 | 52 | 1997 | Syndication | DIC Entertainment | Japanese co-production | TV-Y7 | Traditional |
| Extreme Ghostbusters | 1 | 40 | 1997 | Syndication | Adelaide Productions | | TV-Y7 | Traditional |
| Eye Drops | 1 | 13 | 2002 | TechTV | | | —N/a | CGI |
| Eyes of Wakanda | 1 | 4 | 2025 | Disney+ | Marvel Studios Animation | | TV-14 | CGI |

=== F ===
| Title | Seasons | Episodes | Year | Original channel | American company | Note | Age rating | Technique |
|---|---|---|---|---|---|---|---|---|
| F Is for Family | 5 | 44 | 2015–2021 | Netflix | Gaumont International Television | | TV-MA | Flash |
| Fabulous Funnies | 1 | 13 | 1978–1979 | NBC | Filmation | | —N/a | Traditional |
| Face's Music Party | 1 | 16 | 2022–2023 | Nickelodeon | Nickelodeon Animation Studio | | TV-Y | Traditional |
| Fairfax | 2 | 16 | 2021–2022 | Amazon Prime Video | Amazon Studios | | TV-MA | Flash |
| Fairview | 1 | 8 | 2022 | Comedy Central | Late Night Cartoons, Inc. | | TV-MA | Flash |
| Family Dog | 1 | 10 | 1993 | CBS | Amblin Television | Canadian co-production | TV-PG | Traditional |
| Family Guy | 24 | 446 | 1999–present | Fox | Fuzzy Door Productions | | TV-14 | Traditional |
| Famous Classic Tales | 1 | 31 | 1970–1984 | CBS | Ruby-Spears Enterprises | | —N/a | Traditional |
| Fanboy & Chum Chum | 2 | 52 | 2009–2014 | Nickelodeon | Frederator Studios; Nickelodeon Animation Studio | The last episode aired on Nicktoons in 2014. | TV-Y7 | CGI |
| Fancy Nancy | 3 | 63 | 2018–2022 | Disney Junior | Disney Television Animation | | TV-Y7 | CGI |
| Fangface | 1 | 16 | 1978–1980 | ABC | Ruby-Spears Enterprises | | TV-G | Traditional |
| Fantastic Four (1967) | 1 | 20 | 1967–1968 | ABC | Hanna-Barbera | | TV-Y7 | Traditional |
| Fantastic Four (1994) | 1 | 26 | 1994–1996 | Syndication | Marvel Entertainment | | TV-Y7 | Traditional |
| Fantastic Four: World's Greatest Heroes | 1 | 26 | 2006–2010 | Cartoon Network | Marvel Animation | Canadian-French co-production | TV-Y7 | Traditional |
| Fantastic Max | 2 | 26 | 1988–1990 | Syndication | Hanna-Barbera | British co-production | TV-G | Traditional |
| Fantastic Voyage | 1 | 17 | 1968–1969 | ABC | Filmation Associates | | —N/a | Traditional |
| Fast & Furious Spy Racers | 6 | 52 | 2019–2021 | Netflix | DreamWorks Animation Television; Universal Pictures | | TV-Y7 | CGI |
| Fat Albert and the Cosby Kids | 8 | 110 | 1972–1985 | CBS | Filmation | | TV-Y7 | Traditional |
| Father of the Pride | 1 | 13 | 2004–2005 | NBC | DreamWorks Animation Television | | TV-14 | CGI |
| Fatherhood | 2 | 26 | 2004–2006 | Nick at Nite | Smiley, Inc. | | TV-G | Flash |
| Farzar | 1 | 10 | 2022 | Netflix | Bento Box Entertainment | | TV-MA | Traditional |
| Feeling Good with JoJo | 1 | 20 | 2006–2008 | Playhouse Disney | Cartoon Pizza | Canadian co-production | TV-Y | Stop-motion |
| Felix the Cat | 2 | 260 | 1958–1960 | Syndication | Felix the Cat Productions | | TV-G | Traditional |
| Festival of Family Classics | 1 | 20 | 1972–1973 | Syndication | Rankin/Bass Productions | | —N/a | Traditional |
| Fetch! with Ruff Ruffman | 5 | 100 | 2006–2010 | PBS Kids Go! | WGBH | | TV-Y | Flash/Live-action |
| Fievel's American Tails | 1 | 13 | 1992 | CBS | Amblimation | Canadian co-production | TV-Y | Traditional |
| Fillmore! | 2 | 26 | 2002–2004 | ABC; Toon Disney | Walt Disney Television Animation | | TV-Y7 | Traditional |
| Final Space | 3 | 36 | 2018–2021 | TBS; Adult Swim | ShadowMachine | | TV-14 | Traditional |
| Firebuds | 3 | 60 | 2022–2025 | Disney Junior | Disney Television Animation | | TV-Y | CGI |
| Fired on Mars | 1 | 8 | 2023 | HBO Max | Pat & Mike Productions | | TV-MA | Traditional |
| Firehouse Tales | 1 | 26 | 2005–2006 | Cartoon Network | Warner Bros. Animation | | TV-Y | Traditional |
| Fish Hooks | 5 | 110 | 2010–2014 | Disney Channel | Disney Television Animation | | TV-G | Traditional |
| Fish Police | 1 | 3 | 1992 | CBS | Hanna-Barbera | | TV-PG | Traditional |
| Foofur | 1 | 26 | 1986–1988 | NBC | Hanna-Barbera | | TV-Y | Traditional |
| Force Five | 1 | 130 | 1980–1981 | Syndication | Jim Terry Productions | Japanese co-production | —N/a | Traditional |
| Forky Asks a Question | 1 | 10 | 2019–2020 | Disney+ | Pixar Animation Studios | | TV-G | CGI |
| Foster's Home for Imaginary Friends | 6 | 79 | 2004–2009 | Cartoon Network | Cartoon Network Studios | | TV-Y7 | Flash |
| Four Eyes! | 1 | 24 | 2006 | Nicktoons Network | PorchLight Entertainment | French co-production | TV-Y | Traditional |
| Fox's Peter Pan & the Pirates | 1 | 65 | 1990–1991 | Fox Kids | | Japanese co-production | TV-Y | Traditional |
| Fraggle Rock: The Animated Series | 1 | 13 | 1987 | NBC | Jim Henson Productions | | TV-Y | Traditional |
| Fraidy Cat | 1 | 12 | 1975 | ABC | Filmation | | TV-Y | Traditional |
| Frankenstein Jr. and The Impossibles | 1 | 18 | 1966–1967 | CBS | Hanna-Barbera | | TV-Y7 | Traditional |
| Freak Show | 1 | 8 | 2006 | Comedy Central | Radical Axis | | TV-MA | Flash |
| Freakazoid! | 3 | 24 | 1995–1996 | Kids' WB | Warner Bros. Animation | | TV-G | Traditional |
| Fred and Barney Meet the Shmoo | 1 | 17 | 1979–1980 | NBC | Hanna-Barbera | | TV-G | Traditional |
| Fred and Barney Meet the Thing | 1 | 13 | 1979 | NBC | Hanna-Barbera | | TV-G | Traditional |
| Fred Flintstone and Friends | 1 | 95 | 1977–1978 | Syndication | Hanna-Barbera | | TV-G | Traditional |
| Free for All | 1 | 7 | 2003 | Showtime | Film Roman | | TV-MA | Traditional |
| Free Willy | 2 | 21 | 1994–1995 | ABC | Warner Bros. Television | Canadian co-production | TV-Y | Traditional |
| Fresh Beat Band of Spies | 1 | 20 | 2015–2016 | Nickelodeon | Nickelodeon Animation Studio | Canadian co-production | TV-Y | Flash |
| Friday: The Animated Series | 1 | 7 | 2006 | MTV2 | MTV Animation | | TV-14 | Flash |
| Fright Krewe | 2 | 20 | 2023–2024 | Hulu; Peacock | DreamWorks Animation Television | | TV-Y7 | Traditional |
| Frisky Dingo | 2 | 25 | 2006–2008 | Adult Swim | Williams Street | | TV-MA | Flash |
| Fugget About It | 3 | 46 | 2012–2016 | Hulu | Darius Films | Canadian co-production | TV-MA | Flash |
| Futurama | 10 | 170 | 1999–present | Fox; Comedy Central; Hulu | The Curiosity Company | | TV-14 | Traditional |
| Future-Worm! | 2 | 21 | 2016–2018 | Disney XD | Disney Television Animation | | TV-Y7 | Flash |

=== G ===
| Title | Seasons | Episodes | Year | Original channel | American company | Note | Age rating | Technique |
|---|---|---|---|---|---|---|---|---|
| G-Force: Guardians of Space | 1 | 85 | 1983–1986 | TBS | King Features Syndicate | Japanese co-production | TV-Y7 | Traditional |
| G.I. Joe: A Real American Hero (1983) | 2 | 95 | 1983–1986 | Syndication | Sunbow Entertainment | | TV-PG | Traditional |
| G.I. Joe: A Real American Hero (1989) | 2 | 44 | 1989–1992 | Syndication | DIC Entertainment | | —N/a | Traditional |
| G.I. Joe Extreme | 1 | 26 | 1995–1996 | Syndication | Sunbow Entertainment | | —N/a | Traditional |
| G.I. Joe: Renegades | 1 | 26 | 2010–2011 | The Hub | Hasbro Studios | | TV-Y7 | Traditional |
| G.I. Joe: Resolute | 1 | 11 | 2009 | Adult Swim | Titmouse, Inc. | | TV-14 | Traditional |
| G.I. Joe: Sigma 6 | 1 | 26 | 2005–2006 | 4Kids TV | Hasbro | Japanese co-production | TV-Y7 | Traditional |
| Gabby's Dollhouse | 12 | 81 | 2021–present | Netflix | DreamWorks Animation Television | | TV-Y | CGI |
| Gadget & the Gadgetinis | 1 | 52 | 2002–2003 | Fox Kids | DIC Entertainment | French co-production | TV-Y | Traditional |
| Gadget Boy & Heather | 2 | 52 | 1995–1998 | Syndication | DIC Entertainment | French co-production | TV-Y | Traditional |
| Galaxy High School | 1 | 13 | 1986 | CBS | TMS Entertainment | Japanese co-production | TV-G | Traditional |
| Galtar and the Golden Lance | 1 | 21 | 1985–1986 | Syndication | Hanna-Barbera | | —N/a | Traditional |
| Game Over | 1 | 5 | 2004 | UPN | Carsey-Werner Productions | | TV-PG | CGI |
| Gargoyles | 3 | 78 | 1994–1997 | Syndication | Walt Disney Television Animation | Canadian co-production (season 3 only) | TV-Y7 | Traditional |
| Garfield and Friends | 7 | 121 | 1988–1994 | CBS | Film Roman | | TV-G | Traditional |
| Gary and His Demons | 2 | 26 | 2018–present | VRV; Amazon Prime Video | Mondo Media | Canadian co-production | TV-14 | Flash |
| Gary & Mike | 1 | 13 | 2001 | UPN | Bahr-Small Productions | | TV-PG | Stop-Motion |
| Gary the Rat | 1 | 26 | 2003 | Spike TV | Spike Animation Studios | | TV-MA | Flash |
| Gēmusetto | 2 | 20 | 2019–2020 | Adult Swim | Williams Street | | TV-14 | Traditional |
| Gen:Lock | 1 | 16 | 2019–2021 | Rooster Teeth; HBO Max | Rooster Teeth Studios | | TV-14 | CGI |
| Generation Jets | 1 | 13 | 2003–2004 | WCBS-TV | B-Train Films | | —N/a | Traditional |
| Generation O! | 1 | 13 | 2000–2001 | Kids' WB | Sunbow Entertainment | | TV-Y | Traditional |
| Generator Rex | 3 | 60 | 2010–2013 | Cartoon Network | Cartoon Network Studios | | TV-PG | Traditional |
| Genesis | 1 | 3 | 2023 | YouTube | Blizzard Entertainment | | TV-14 | Traditional |
| George and Martha | 2 | 26 | 1999–2000 | HBO Family | Nelvana | Canadian co-production | TV-Y | Traditional |
| George of the Jungle | 1 | 17 | 1967 | ABC | Jay Ward Productions | | TV-G | Traditional |
| George of the Jungle (2007) | 2 | 52 | 2007–2017 | Cartoon Network | Jay Ward Productions | Canadian co-production | TV-Y7 | Flash |
| Gerald McBoing-Boing | 2 | 52 | 2005–2007 | Cartoon Network | Cookie Jar Entertainment | Canadian co-production | TV-Y | Flash |
| Get Ed | 1 | 26 | 2005–2006 | Jetix | Jetix Animation Concepts | Canadian co-production | TV-Y7 | CGI |
| Get Jiro | 1 | 10 | 2026–present | Adult Swim | Warner Bros. Animation; DC Comics | | TV-MA | Traditional |
| Ghostbusters | 1 | 65 | 1986 | Syndication | Filmation | | TV-Y7 | Traditional |
| Gilligan's Planet | 1 | 13 | 1982 | CBS | Filmation | | —N/a | Traditional |
| Ginger Snaps | 1 | 9 | 2017 | ABCd | Blue Ribbon Content | Australian co-production | TV-MA | Flash |
| Glenn Martin, DDS | 2 | 40 | 2009–2011 | Nick at Nite | The Tornante Company | Canadian co-production | TV-PG | Stop-Motion |
| Glitch Techs | 1 | 19 | 2020 | Netflix | Nickelodeon Animation Studio | | TV-Y7 | Flash |
| Go Away, Unicorn! | 2 | 52 | 2018–2019 | Disney Channel | Sonar Entertainment | Canadian co-production | TV-Y7 | Flash |
| Go, Diego, Go! | 5 | 80 | 2005–2013 | Nickelodeon | Nickelodeon Animation Studio | The last episode aired on Nick Jr. in 2013. | TV-Y | Traditional |
| Go, Dog. Go! | 4 | 40 | 2021–2023 | Netflix | DreamWorks Animation Television | Canadian co-production | TV-Y | CGI |
| Go Go Gophers | 1 | 48 | 1968–1969 | CBS | Total Television; Leonardo Television | | TV-Y7 | Traditional |
| God, the Devil and Bob | 1 | 13 | 2000, 2011 | NBC; Adult Swim | Carsey-Werner Productions | | TV-14 | Traditional |
| Godzilla | 1 | 26 | 1978–1979 | NBC | Hanna-Barbera | | TV-Y7 | Traditional |
| Godzilla: The Series | 1 | 40 | 1998–1999 | Fox Kids | Adelaide Productions | Japanese co-production | TV-Y7 | Traditional |
| Golan the Insatiable | 2 | 12 | 2013–2015 | Fox | ADHD Studios | | TV-14 | Flash |
| Golden Axe | 1 | 10 | 2026 | Paramount+ | CBS Eye Animation Productions | | TV-14 | Traditional |
| Goldie | 1 | 13 | 2025 | Apple TV+ | Mercury Filmworks | | —N/a | Flash |
| Goldie & Bear | 2 | 45 | 2015–2018 | Disney Junior | Titmouse, Inc. | | TV-Y | CGI |
| Goldie Gold and Action Jack | 1 | 13 | 1981 | ABC | Ruby-Spears Enterprises | | —N/a | Traditional |
| Goober and the Ghost Chasers | 1 | 16 | 1973 | ABC | Hanna-Barbera | | TV-G | Traditional |
| Good Morning, Mickey! | 1 | 80 | 1983–1992 | The Disney Channel | Walt Disney Productions | | —N/a | Traditional |
| Good Morning Today | 1 | 20 | 2013–2014 | Fusion TV | The Jim Henson Company | | TV-14 | CGI |
| Good Times: Black Again | 1 | 10 | 2024–present | Netflix | Fuzzy Door Productions | | TV-MA | Flash |
| Good Vibes | 1 | 13 | 2011 | MTV | MTV Animation | | TV-14 | Flash |
| Goof Troop | 2 | 78 | 1992 | Syndication | Walt Disney Television Animation | | TV-Y | Traditional |
| Gotham Girls | 1 | 30 | 2000–2002 | warnerbros.com | Warner Bros. Animation | | —N/a | Flash |
| Gravedale High | 1 | 13 | 1990 | NBC | Hanna-Barbera | | TV-Y7 | Traditional |
| Gravity Falls | 2 | 40 | 2012–2016 | Disney Channel (2012-14); Disney XD (2014-16) | Disney Television Animation | | TV-Y7 | Traditional |
| Greatest Party Story Ever | 2 | 20 | 2016 | MTV | ShadowMachine; MTV Animation | | TV-14 | Flash |
| Green Eggs and Ham | 2 | 23 | 2019–2022 | Netflix | Warner Bros. Animation | | TV-Y7 | Traditional |
| Green Lantern: The Animated Series | 1 | 26 | 2011–2013 | Cartoon Network | Warner Bros. Animation; DC Entertainment | | TV-14 | CGI |
| Gremlins | 2 | 20 | 2023–present | Max | Warner Bros. Animation | | TV-Y7 | CGI |
| Grim & Evil | 2 | 27 | 2001–2004 | Cartoon Network | Cartoon Network Studios | | TV-Y7 | Traditional |
| Grimsburg | 2 | 26 | 2024–present | Fox | Bento Box Entertainment | | TV-14 | Flash |
| Growing Up Creepie | 1 | 26 | 2006–2008 | Discovery Kids | Mike Young Productions | Canadian co-production | TV-Y7 | Flash |
| Guardians of the Galaxy | 5 | 79 | 2015–2019 | Disney XD | Marvel Animation | | TV-Y7 | Traditional |

=== H ===
| Title | Seasons | Episodes | Year | Original channel | American company | Note | Age rating | Technique |
|---|---|---|---|---|---|---|---|---|
| Haha, You Clowns | 1 | 1 | 2025-present | Adult Swim | Williams Street | | TV-14 | Flash |
| Hailey's On It! | 1 | 30 | 2023–2024 | Disney Channel | Disney Television Animation | | TV-Y7 | Traditional |
| Hammerman | 1 | 13 | 1991–1992 | ABC | DIC Entertainment | Canadian-Italian co-production | TV-Y7 | Traditional |
| Hamster & Gretel | 2 | 50 | 2022–present | Disney Channel | Disney Television Animation | | TV-Y7 | Traditional |
| Hanazuki: Full of Treasures | 2 | 35 | 2017–2019 | YouTube; Discovery Family | Titmouse, Inc | | TV-Y7 | Flash |
| Handy Manny | 3 | 113 | 2006–2013 | Playhouse Disney | Disney Television Animation | Canadian co-production | TV-Y | CGI |
| Handy Manny's School for Tools | 1 | 19 | 2010–2012 | Playhouse Disney | Disney Television Animation | Canadian co-production | TV-Y | CGI |
| Hanna–Barbera's World of Super Adventure | 1 | 129 | 1978–1984 | Syndication | Hanna-Barbera | | —N/a | Traditional |
| Happily Ever After: Fairy Tales for Every Child | 3 | 39 | 1995–2000 | HBO | Hyperion Animation | | TV-Y | Traditional |
| Happy! | 2 | 18 | 2017–2019 | Syfy | Universal Content Productions | | TV-MA | CGI/Live-action |
| Happy Monster Band | 2 | 20 | 2007–2008 | Playhouse Disney | Kickstart Productions | British co-production | TV-Y | Flash |
| Happy Ness: The Secret of the Loch | 1 | 13 | 1995 | | Abrams/Gentile Entertainment | French co-production | —N/a | Traditional |
| Happy Tree Friends | 1 | 13 | 2006 | G4 | Mondo Media | Canadian co-production | TV-MA | Flash |
| Hard Drinkin' Lincoln | 1 | 16 | 2000–2002 | | icebox.com | | —N/a | Flash |
| Harlem Globetrotters | 1 | 22 | 1970–1971 | CBS | Hanna-Barbera | | TV-G | Traditional |
| HarmonQuest | 3 | 30 | 2016–2019 | Seeso; VRV | Universal Content Productions | | TV-14 | Flash/Live-Action |
| Harriet the Spy | 2 | 20 | 2021–2023 | Apple TV+ | The Jim Henson Company | | TV-Y7 | Flash |
| Harley Quinn | 5 | 57 | 2019–present | DC Universe; Max | Warner Bros. Animation; DC Entertainment | | TV-MA | Traditional |
| Harold and the Purple Crayon | 1 | 13 | 2001–2002 | HBO Family | Adelaide Productions | | TV-Y | Traditional |
| Harvey Beaks | 2 | 52 | 2015–2017 | Nickelodeon | Nickelodeon Animation Studio | The last 15 episodes aired on Nicktoons in 2017. | TV-Y7 | Traditional |
| Harvey Birdman, Attorney at Law | 4 | 39 | 2000–2007 | Adult Swim | Cartoon Network Studios (season 1); Williams Street | | TV-14 | Flash |
| Harvey Girls Forever! | 4 | 52 | 2018–2020 | Netflix | DreamWorks Animation Television | | TV-Y7 | Traditional |
| Haunted Hotel | 1 | 10 | 2025–present | Netflix | Netflix Animation Studios | | TV-14 | Traditional |
| Have a Laugh! | 1 | 60 | 2009–2012 | Disney Channel | Disney Television Animation | | TV-G | Traditional |
| Hazbin Hotel | 1 | 8 | 2024-present | Amazon Prime Video | SpindleHorse Toons; A24; Bento Box Entertainment | | TV-MA | Traditional |
| Hey A.J.! | 1 | 25 | 2026–present | Disney Jr. | Surfing Giant Studios | | TV-Y | Traditional |
| HBO Storybook Musicals | 1 | 18 | 1987–1993 | HBO | Michael Sporn Animation; Klasky Csupo; Cinar; Random House | | TV-Y | Traditional |
| HBTV | 2 | 52 | 1985–1987 | Syndication | Hanna-Barbera | | —N/a | Traditional |
| He-Man and the Masters of the Universe (1983) | 3 | 130 | 1983–1985 | Syndication | Filmation | | TV-Y7 | Traditional |
| He-Man and the Masters of the Universe (2002) | 3 | 39 | 2002–2004 | Cartoon Network | Mike Young Productions | Canadian co-production | TV-Y7 | Traditional |
| He-Man and the Masters of the Universe (2021) | 2 | 26 | 2021–2022 | Netflix | Mattel Television | | TV-Y7 | CGI |
| Headspace Guide to Meditation | 1 | 8 | 2021 | Netflix | Headspace Studios | | TV-G | Flash |
| Headspace Guide to Sleep | 1 | 7 | 2021 | Netflix | Headspace Studios | | TV-G | Flash |
| Heathcliff (1980) | 1 | 26 | 1980–1981 | ABC | Ruby-Spears Enterprises | | TV-G | Traditional |
| Heathcliff (1984) | 2 | 86 | 1984–1985 | Syndication | DIC Entertainment | | TV-G | Traditional |
| Heavy Gear: The Animated Series | 1 | 40 | 2001–2002 | Syndication | Adelaide Productions | Canadian co-production | TV-Y7 | CGI |
| Hell Den | 2 | 12 | 2019–2020 | DrinkTV; Syfy | Dr. God Productions | | TV-MA | Flash |
| Hello Kitty's Furry Tale Theater | 1 | 13 | 1987 | CBS | DIC Entertainment | Canadian-Japanese co-production | TV-Y | Traditional |
| Helluva Boss | 2 | 21 | 2020–present | YouTube | SpindleHorse Toons | | TV-MA | Flash |
| Help!... It's the Hair Bear Bunch! | 1 | 20 | 1976–1977 | CBS | Hanna-Barbera | | TV-G | Traditional |
| Henry Hugglemonster | 2 | 49 | 2013–2015 | Disney Junior | Brown Bag Films | | TV-Y | CGI |
| Hercules | 2 | 65 | 1998–1999 | ABC | Walt Disney Television Animation | | TV-Y | Traditional |
| Here Comes the Grump | 1 | 17 | 1969–1970 | NBC | DePatie–Freleng Enterprises | | —N/a | Traditional |
| Hermie and Friends | 1 | 16 | 2002–2010 | Direct-to-video | GlueWorks Entertainment; Tommy Nelson | | TV-G | CGI |
| Hero Elementary | 1 | 40 | 2020–2022 | PBS Kids | Twin Cities PBS | Canadian co-production | TV-Y | Flash |
| Hero Factory | 1 | 11 | 2010–2014 | Nicktoons | Threshold Animation Studios | Chinese-Danish co-production | TV-Y7 | CGI |
| Hero High | 1 | 26 | 1981–1982 | NBC | Filmation | | —N/a | Traditional |
| Hero: 108 | 2 | 52 | 2010–2012 | Cartoon Network | MoonScoop Entertainment | British-Chinese-Taiwanese co-production | TV-Y7 | Flash |
| Hey Arnold! | 5 | 100 | 1996–2004 | Nickelodeon | Nickelodeon Animation Studio | | TV-Y7 | Traditional |
| Heyyy, It's the King! | 1 | 13 | 1977 | NBC | Hanna-Barbera | | TV-G | Traditional |
| Hey Joel | 1 | 13 | 2003 | VH1 | Curious Pictures | | TV-14 | Flash |
| Hey Monie! | 1 | 25 | 2003 | BET | Soup2Nuts | | TV-14 | Flash |
| Higglytown Heroes | 3 | 65 | 2004–2008 | Playhouse Disney | Wild Brain | | TV-Y | CGI |
| High Guardian Spice | 1 | 12 | 2021 | Crunchyroll | Crunchyroll Studios | | TV-MA | Traditional |
| High School USA! | 1 | 12 | 2013–2015 | Fox | ADHD Studios | The last episode aired on FXX in 2015. | TV-MA | Flash |
| Highlander: The Animated Series | 2 | 40 | 1994–1996 | Syndication; USA Network | Gaumont Television | Canadian-French co-production | TV-Y7 | Traditional |
| Hi Hi Puffy AmiYumi | 3 | 39 | 2004–2006 | Cartoon Network | Renegade Animation; Cartoon Network Studios | | TV-Y7 | Flash |
| Histeria! | 2 | 52 | 1998–2000 | Kids' WB | Warner Bros. Animation | | TV-Y | Traditional |
| Hit-Monkey | 2 | 20 | 2021–2024 | Hulu | Floyd County Productions | | TV-14 | Traditional |
| HobbyKids Adventures | 1 | 27 | 2019–2020 | YouTube | PocketWatch, Inc. | | TV-Y7 | Flash |
| Hokey Wolf | 1 | 28 | 1960–1961 | Syndication | Hanna-Barbera | | TV-G | Traditional |
| Holly Hobbie & Friends | 1 | 8 | 2006–2009 | Nickelodeon | Nickelodeon Animation Studio; American Greetings | | TV-Y | Traditional |
| Home: Adventures with Tip & Oh | 4 | 52 | 2016–2018 | Netflix | DreamWorks Animation Television | | TV-Y7 | Flash |
| Home Movies | 4 | 52 | 1999–2004 | UPN; Adult Swim | Tom Synder Productions | | TV-PG | Flash |
| Hoops | 1 | 10 | 2020 | Netflix | Pepper Hill Productions | | TV-MA | Flash |
| Hong Kong Phooey | 1 | 16 | 1974 | ABC | Hanna-Barbera | | TV-G | Traditional |
| Hopeless Pictures | 1 | 9 | 2005 | IFC | Noodlesoup Productions | | TV-14 | Flash |
| Hoppity Hooper | 3 | 52 | 1964–1967 | ABC | Jay Ward Productions | | —N/a | Traditional |
| Horseland | 3 | 39 | 2006–2008 | CBS | DIC Entertainment | | TV-Y7 | Traditional |
| Hot Streets | 2 | 20 | 2018–2019 | Adult Swim | Williams Street | | TV-14 | Traditional |
| Hot Wheels | 1 | 17 | 1969–1971 | ABC | Ken Snyder Properties | | —N/a | Traditional |
| Hot Wheels Battle Force 5 | 2 | 52 | 2009–2011 | Cartoon Network | Mattel, Inc. | Canadian co-production | TV-Y7 | CGI |
| Hot Wheels Let's Race | 1 | 10 | 2024–present | Netflix | Mattel Television | | TV-Y | CGI |
| Hotel Transylvania: The Series | 2 | 52 | 2017–2020 | Disney Channel | Sony Pictures Animation | Canadian co-production | TV-Y7 | Flash |
| House of Cosbys | 1 | 4 | 2005 | Channel 101 | | | —N/a | Flash |
| House of Mouse | 3 | 52 | 2001–2003 | ABC; Toon Disney | Walt Disney Television Animation | | TV-G | Traditional |
| HouseBroken | 2 | 30 | 2021–2023 | Fox | Bento Box Entertainment | | TV-14 | Traditional |
| How to Stay at Home | 1 | 3 | 2021 | Disney+ | Disney Television Animation | | TV-G | Traditional |
| Hulk Hogan's Rock 'n' Wrestling | 2 | 26 | 1985–1986 | CBS | DIC Entertainment | | TV-Y7 | Traditional |
| Human Kind Of | 1 | 21 | 2018 | Facebook Watch | Cartuna | | TV-MA | Traditional |
| Human Resources | 2 | 20 | 2022–2023 | Netflix | Titmouse, Inc. | | TV-MA | Flash |
| Hurricanes | 5 | 65 | 1993–1997 | Syndication | DIC Entertainment | British co-production | TV-Y7 | Traditional |

=== I ===
| Title | Seasons | Episodes | Year | Original channel | American company | Note | Age rating | Technique |
|---|---|---|---|---|---|---|---|---|
| I Am Groot | 2 | 10 | 2022–2023 | Disney+ | Marvel Studios Animation | | TV-PG | CGI |
| I Am the Greatest: The Adventures of Muhammad Ali | 1 | 13 | 1977 | NBC | Farmhouse Films | | —N/a | Traditional |
| I Am Weasel | 5 | 79 | 1997–2000 | Cartoon Network | Hanna-Barbera | | TV-Y7 | Traditional |
| I Got a Rocket | 1 | 26 | 2006–2007 | Kabillion | Mike Young Productions | Australian co-production | TV-Y7 | Flash |
| I Heart Arlo | 1 | 19 | 2021 | Netflix | Titmouse, Inc. | | TV-Y7 | Traditional |
| I Spy | 2 | 26 | 2002–2003 | HBO Family | Scholastic Media | | TV-Y | Stop-motion |
| Ice Age: Scrat Tales | 1 | 6 | 2022 | Disney+ | Blue Sky Studios | | TV-G | CGI |
| Iconicles | 1 | 26 | 2011 | Discovery Familia | Dinamo Productions | British co-production | TV-Y | CGI/Flash/Live-action |
| If You Give a Mouse a Cookie | 3 | 50 | 2017–2021 | Amazon Prime Video | Amazon Studios | Canadian co-production | TV-Y | Traditional |
| Iggy Arbuckle | 1 | 26 | 2007 | Animalia HD | National Geographic Kids | Canadian co-production | TV-Y7 | Flash |
| Imaginary Mary | 1 | 9 | 2017 | ABC | Happy Madison Productions | | TV-PG | CGI/Live-Action |
| In the Bleachers | 1 | 28 | 2002 | ESPN | Walt Disney Television Animation | | —N/a | Flash |
| In the Know | 1 | 6 | 2024 | Peacock | ShadowMachine | | TV-MA | Stop-motion |
| Inch High, Private Eye | 1 | 13 | 1973 | NBC | Hanna-Barbera | | TV-G | Traditional |
| Infinity Train | 4 | 40 | 2019–2021 | Cartoon Network (2019); HBO Max (2020–2022) | Cartoon Network Studios | | TV-Y7 | Traditional |
| Inhumanoids | 1 | 13 | 1986 | Syndication | Sunbow Entertainment | | —N/a | Traditional |
| Inside Job | 1 | 18 | 2021–2022 | Netflix | Netflix Animation | | TV-MA | Traditional |
| Inspector Gadget | 2 | 86 | 1983–1986 | Syndication | DIC Entertainment | Canadian-French co-production | TV-Y | Traditional |
| Inspector Gadget's Field Trip | 1 | 22 | 1996–1998 | The History Channel | DIC Entertainment | | TV-Y7 | Traditional/Live-action |
| Interrupting Chicken | 1 | 9 | 2022–present | Apple TV+ | Mercury Filmworks | Canadian co-production | TV-Y | Traditional |
| Invader Zim | 2 | 27 | 2001–2006 | Nickelodeon | Nickelodeon Animation Studio | The last 6 episodes aired on Nicktoons Network in 2006. | TV-Y7 | Traditional |
| Invasion America | 1 | 13 | 1998 | The WB | DreamWorks Animation Television | | TV-Y7 | Traditional |
| Invincible | 3 | 25 | 2021–present | Amazon Prime Video | Amazon Studios | Canadian co-production | TV-MA | Traditional |
| Invincible Fight Girl | 1 | 13 | 2024–present | Adult Swim | Cartoon Network Studios | | TV-Y7 | Traditional |
| Iron Man | 2 | 26 | 1994–1996 | Syndication | Marvel Entertainment | | TV-Y7 | Traditional |
| Iron Man and His Awesome Friends | 1 | 26 | 2025–present | Disney Jr. | Marvel Studios Animation | | TV-Y7 | CGI |
| Iron Man: Armored Adventures | 2 | 52 | 2009–2012 | Nicktoons | Marvel Animation | Canadian-French co-production | TV-Y7 | CGI |
| It's a Big Big World | 2 | 47 | 2006–2010 | PBS Kids | Big Big Productions | | TV-Y | CGI/Live-Action |
| It's a Small World: The Animated Series | 1 | 9 | 2013–2014 | Disney.com | Disney Television Animation | | —N/a | Flash |
| It's Punky Brewster | 1 | 26 | 1985–1986 | NBC | Ruby-Spears Enterprises | | TV-Y | Traditional |
| It's the Wolf! | 1 | 25 | 1969–1970 | ABC | Hanna-Barbera | | TV-G | Traditional |
| Iyanu: Child of Wonder | 1 | 15 | 2025–present | Cartoon Network | Lion Forge Animation | | TV-Y7 | Traditional |

=== J ===
| Title | Seasons | Episodes | Year | Original channel | American company | Note | Age rating | Technique |
|---|---|---|---|---|---|---|---|---|
| Jabberjaw | 1 | 16 | 1976 | ABC | Hanna-Barbera | | TV-G | Traditional |
| Jabberwocky | 2 | | 1972–1974 | WCVB-TV | | | | Traditional/Live-action |
| Jackie Chan Adventures | 5 | 95 | 2000–2005 | Kids' WB | Adelaide Productions | | TV-Y7 | Traditional |
| Jake and the Never Land Pirates | 5 | 116 | 2011–2016 | Disney Junior | Disney Television Animation | | TV-Y | Flash |
| Jakers! The Adventures of Piggley Winks | 3 | 52 | 2003–2007 | PBS Kids | Mike Young Productions | British co-production | TV-Y | CGI |
| James Bond Jr. | 1 | 65 | 1991–1992 | Syndication | Murakami-Wolf-Swenson | | TV-Y | Traditional |
| Jana of the Jungle | 1 | 13 | 1978 | NBC | Hanna-Barbera | | —N/a | Traditional |
| Jay Jay the Jet Plane | 4 | 62 | 1998–2005 | TLC; PBS Kids | PorchLight Entertainment | | TV-Y | CGI/Live-action |
| Jeannie | 1 | 16 | 1973 | CBS | Hanna-Barbera | | —N/a | Traditional |
| Jeff & Some Aliens | 1 | 10 | 2017 | Comedy Central | ShadowMachine | | TV-MA | Traditional |
| Jelly, Ben & Pogo | 1 | 23 | 2021–2022 | PBS Kids | | Shown on Alma's Way. | TV-Y | Flash |
| Jellystone! | 3 | 77 | 2021–2025 | HBO Max | Warner Bros. Animation | | TV-G | Flash |
| Jem | 3 | 65 | 1985–1988 | Syndication | Sunbow Entertainment | | TV-Y7 | Traditional |
| Jentry Chau vs. the Underworld | 1 | 13 | 2024 | Netflix | Titmouse, Inc. | | TV-PG | Traditional |
| Jessica's Big Little World | 1 | 10 | 2023–2024 | Cartoonito | Cartoon Network Studios | | TV-Y | Traditional |
| Jim and Judy in Teleland | 1 | 52 | 1949–1950 | Syndication | Television Screen Productions | | —N/a | Traditional |
| Jin Jin and the Panda Patrol | 1 | 26 | 1994 | | Saban Entertainment | Chinese co-production | —N/a | Traditional |
| JJ Villard's Fairy Tales | 1 | 6 | 2020 | Adult Swim | Williams Street | | TV-MA | Traditional |
| Johnny Bravo | 4 | 65 | 1997–2004 | Cartoon Network | Hanna-Barbera | | TV-Y7 | Traditional |
| Johnny Cypher in Dimension Zero | 1 | 131 | 1967–1968 | Syndication | Oriolo Film Studios, Inc. | Japanese co-production | —N/a | Traditional |
| Johnny Test | 6 | 117 | 2005–2014 | The WB (Kids' WB) (2005–2008); Cartoon Network (2009–2014) | Warner Bros. Animation (seasons 1-2) | Canadian co-production | TV-Y7 | Traditional/Digital ink-and-paint (season 1)/Flash/Adobe Flash (seasons 2-6) |
| JoJo's Circus | 3 | 63 | 2003–2007 | Playhouse Disney | Cartoon Pizza | Canadian co-production | TV-Y | Stop-motion |
| Jokebook | 1 | 3 | 1982 | NBC | Hanna-Barbera | | —N/a | Traditional |
| Jonny Quest | 1 | 26 | 1964–1965 | ABC | Hanna-Barbera | | TV-Y7 | Traditional |
| Josie and the Pussycats | 1 | 16 | 1970 | CBS | Hanna-Barbera | | TV-G | Traditional |
| Josie and the Pussycats in Outer Space | 1 | 16 | 1972 | CBS | Hanna-Barbera | | TV-G | Traditional |
| JOT | 1 | 30 | 1965–1974 | Syndication | | First animated preschool television series. | TV-Y | Traditional |
| Journey to the Center of the Earth | 1 | 17 | 1967–1969 | ABC | Filmation | | —N/a | Traditional |
| Julius Jr. | 2 | 52 | 2013–2015 | Nick Jr. | Saban Brands | Canadian co-production | TV-Y | Flash |
| Jumanji | 3 | 40 | 1996–1999 | UPN; Syndication | Adelaide Productions | | TV-Y7 | Traditional |
| Jungle Cubs | 2 | 21 | 1996–1998 | ABC | Walt Disney Television Animation | | TV-Y | Traditional |
| Jungle Junction | 2 | 45 | 2009–2012 | Playhouse Disney | Spider Eye Productions | British co-production | TV-Y | CGI |
| Jurassic World Camp Cretaceous | 5 | 49 | 2020–2022 | Netflix | DreamWorks Animation Television | | TV-Y7 | CGI |
| Jurassic World: Chaos Theory | 4 | 39 | 2024–2025 | Netflix | DreamWorks Animation Television | | TV-Y7 | CGI |
| Justice League | 2 | 52 | 2001–2004 | Cartoon Network | Warner Bros. Animation | | TV-Y7 | Traditional |
| Justice League Action | 1 | 52 | 2016–2018 | Cartoon Network | Warner Bros. Animation; DC Entertainment | | TV-Y7 | Traditional |
| Justice League Unlimited | 3 | 39 | 2004–2006 | Cartoon Network | Warner Bros. Animation | | TV-Y7 | Traditional |
| Justice League: Gods and Monsters Chronicles | 1 | 3 | 2015 | Machinima | Warner Bros. Animation; DC Entertainment | | TV-MA | Traditional |

=== K ===
| Title | Seasons | Episodes | Year | Original channel | American company | Note | Age rating | Technique |
|---|---|---|---|---|---|---|---|---|
| KaBlam! | 4 | 48 | 1996–2000 | Nickelodeon | Nickelodeon Animation Studio | | TV-Y7 | Traditional |
| Kaijudo | 2 | 52 | 2012–2013 | The Hub Network | Hasbro Studios | | TV-Y7 | Traditional |
| Kamp Koral: SpongeBob's Under Years | 2 | 39 | 2021–2024 | Paramount+ | United Plankton Pictures; Nickelodeon Animation Studio | | TV-Y7 | CGI |
| Kappa Mikey | 2 | 52 | 2006–2008 | Nicktoons Network | Animation Collective | | TV-Y7 | Flash |
| Karate Kommandos | 1 | 5 | 1986 | Syndication | Ruby-Spears Enterprises | | TV-Y7 | Traditional |
| Karma's World | 4 | 40 | 2021–2022 | Netflix | Brown Bag Films | Canadian co-production | TV-Y | CGI |
| Kenny the Shark | 2 | 26 | 2003–2005 | Discovery Kids | Phase 4 | | TV-Y7 | Traditional |
| Kevin | 1 | 8 | 2026 | Amazon Prime Video | Titmouse, Inc. | | TV-MA | Traditional |
| Kick Buttowski: Suburban Daredevil | 2 | 54 | 2010–2012 | Disney XD | Disney Television Animation | | TV-Y7 | Flash |
| Kid Cosmic | 3 | 24 | 2021–2022 | Netflix | Netflix Animation | | TV-Y7 | Traditional |
| Kid Notorious | 1 | 13 | 2003 | Comedy Central | 6 Point Harness | | TV-14 | Traditional |
| Kid 'n Play | 1 | 13 | 1990 | NBC | Marvel Productions | | —N/a | Traditional |
| Kidd Video | 2 | 26 | 1984–1985 | NBC | DIC Entertainment | | TV-Y7 | Traditional |
| Kideo TV | 1 | 30 | 1986–1987 | Syndication | DIC Entertainment | | —N/a | Traditional |
| Kindergarten: The Musical | 1 | 26 | 2024–present | Disney Jr. | OddBot Inc. | | TV-Y | CGI/Flash |
| Kinderwood | 1 | 30 | 2020–2021 | Noggin | Titmouse, Inc. | | TV-Y | Traditional |
| Kizazi Moto: Generation Fire | 1 | 10 | 2023 | Disney+ | Triggerfish Animation Studios | South African co-production | TV-Y7 | Traditional/CGI |
| Kiff | 2 | 60 | 2023–present | Disney Channel | Disney Television Animation | South African co-production | TV-Y7 | Traditional |
| Kim Possible | 4 | 92 | 2002–2007 | Disney Channel | Walt Disney Television Animation | | TV-G | Traditional |
| King Arthur and the Knights of Justice | 1 | 26 | 1992–1993 | Syndication | Bohbot Entertainment | Canadian-French co-production | —N/a | Traditional |
| King Leonardo and His Short Subjects | 1 | 102 | 1960–1963 | NBC | Total Television | | —N/a | Traditional |
| King of the Hill | 14 | 269 | 1997–2010, 2025–present | Fox; Hulu | Deedle-Dee Productions | | TV-PG | Traditional |
| King Star King | 1 | 6 | 2014 | Adult Swim | Williams Street | | TV-MA | Traditional |
| Kings of Atlantis | 1 | 13 | 2017 | YouTube Premium | YouTube Studio | | TV-Y7 | CGI |
| Kipo and the Age of Wonderbeasts | 3 | 30 | 2020 | Netflix | DreamWorks Animation Television | | TV-Y7 | Traditional |
| Kissyfur | 1 | 26 | 1986–1988 | NBC | DIC Entertainment | | TV-Y | Traditional |
| Kite Man: Hell Yeah! | 1 | 10 | 2024 | Max | Warner Bros. Animation; DC Entertainment | | TV-MA | Traditional |
| Klondike Kat | 1 | 26 | 1966–1967 | CBS | Total Television | | —N/a | Traditional |
| Klutter! | 1 | 8 | 1995–1996 | Fox Kids | Film Roman | | —N/a | Traditional |
| Koala Man | 1 | 8 | 2023 | Hulu | Bento Box Entertainment | Australian co-production | TV-14 | Flash |
| Kong: King of the Apes | 2 | 23 | 2016–2018 | Netflix | Sprite Animation Studios | Canadian-Japanese co-production | TV-Y7 | CGI |
| Krapopolis | 3 | 57 | 2023–present | Fox | Bento Box Entertainment | | TV-14 | Flash |
| Krypto Saves the Day! | 1 | 4 | 2025–2026 | YouTube | Warner Bros. Animation | | TV-G | Traditional |
| Krypto the Superdog | 2 | 39 | 2005–2006 | Cartoon Network | Warner Bros. Animation | | TV-Y | Traditional |
| Kulipari | 3 | 26 | 2016–2024 | Netflix; Hulu | Splash Entertainment | Irish co-production | TV-Y7 | Flash |
| Kung Fu Panda: The Dragon Knight | 3 | 42 | 2022–2023 | Netflix | DreamWorks Animation Television | | TV-Y7 | CGI |
| Kung Fu Panda: Legends of Awesomeness | 3 | 80 | 2011–2016 | Nickelodeon | DreamWorks Animation Television; Nickelodeon Animation Studio | The last 10 episodes aired on Nicktoons in 2016. | TV-Y7 | CGI |
| Kung Fu Panda: The Paws of Destiny | 1 | 26 | 2018–2019 | Amazon Prime Video | DreamWorks Animation Television | | TV-Y7 | CGI |
| Kuu Kuu Harajuku | 3 | 78 | 2015–2019 | Nickelodeon | Red Flags Fly | Canadian-Japanese-Malaysian co-production | TV-Y7 | Flash |

=== L ===
| Title | Seasons | Episodes | Year | Original channel | American company | Note | Age rating | Technique |
|---|---|---|---|---|---|---|---|---|
| Lady Lovely Locks | 1 | 20 | 1987 | Syndication | DIC Entertainment | | —N/a | Traditional |
| Laff-A-Lympics | 1 | 24 | 1977–1978 | ABC | Hanna-Barbera | | TV-G | Traditional |
| Lalaloopsy | 2 | 52 | 2013–2015 | Nick Jr. | MoonScoop Entertainment | | TV-Y | Flash |
| Larryboy: The Cartoon Adventures | 1 | 4 | 2002–2003 | Direct-to-video | Big Idea Productions | | TV-Y7 | Flash |
| Lassie | 2 | 52 | 2014–2019 | Paramount+ | Classic Media | French-German co-production | TV-Y7 | Traditional (season 1)/CGI (season 2) |
| Lassie's Rescue Rangers | 1 | 16 | 1972–1973 | ABC | Filmation | | TV-G | Traditional |
| Laurel and Hardy | 1 | 156 | 1966–1967 | Syndication | Hanna-Barbera | | —N/a | Traditional |
| Laverne & Shirley | 1 | 21 | 1981–1982 | ABC | Hanna-Barbera | | —N/a | Traditional |
| Lazer Tag Academy | 1 | 13 | 1986 | NBC | Ruby-Spears Productions | | —N/a | Traditional |
| Lazor Wulf | 2 | 20 | 2019–2021 | Adult Swim | Williams Street | | TV-MA | Flash |
| Legend of the Three Caballeros | 1 | 13 | 2018 | Disney Channel | 6 Point Harness | | TV-Y7 | Flash |
| Legends of Chamberlain Heights | 2 | 20 | 2016–2017 | Comedy Central | Bento Box Entertainment | | TV-MA | Flash |
| Legion of Super Heroes | 2 | 26 | 2006–2008 | Kids' WB | Warner Bros. Animation; DC Entertainment | | TV-Y7 | Traditional |
| Lego City Adventures | 4 | 65 | 2019–2022 | Nickelodeon; Netflix; YouTube | The Lego Group | Danish co-production | TV-Y7 | CGI |
| Lego Elves: Secrets of Elvendale | 1 | 8 | 2017 | Netflix | The Lego Group | Danish co-production | TV-Y7 | Traditional |
| Lego Jurassic World: Legend of Isla Nublar | 1 | 13 | 2019 | Nickelodeon | The Lego Group | Canadian co-production | TV-Y7 | CGI |
| Lego Star Wars: Droid Tales | 1 | 5 | 2015 | Disney XD | Lucasfilm | | TV-Y7 | CGI |
| Lego Star Wars: Rebuild the Galaxy | 1 | 4 | 2024 | Disney+ | Lucasfilm | | TV-Y7 | CGI |
| Lego Star Wars: The Freemaker Adventures | 2 | 26 | 2016–2017 | Disney XD | Lucasfilm | | TV-Y7 | CGI |
| Lego Star Wars: The Resistance Rises | 1 | 5 | 2016 | Disney XD | Lucasfilm | | TV-Y7 | CGI |
| Let's Go Luna! | 2 | 64 | 2018–2022 | PBS Kids | Joe Murray Productions | Canadian co-production | TV-Y | Flash |
| Liberty's Kids | 1 | 40 | 2002–2003 | PBS Kids | DIC Entertainment | | TV-Y7 | Traditional |
| Life with Louie | 3 | 39 | 1995–1998 | Fox Kids | Hyperion Animation | | TV-Y | Traditional |
| Like, Share, Die | 2 | 16 | 2015 | Fusion TV | Mondo Media | | TV-MA | Flash |
| Lilo & Stitch: The Series | 2 | 67 | 2003–2006 | Disney Channel | Walt Disney Television Animation | | TV-G | Traditional |
| Lil' Bush | 2 | 17 | 2007–2008 | Comedy Central | Sugarshack Animation | One episode was left unaired. | TV-MA | Flash |
| Linus the Lionhearted | 2 | 39 | 1964–1969 | CBS; ABC | Ed Graham Productions | | —N/a | Traditional |
| Lippy the Lion and Hardy Har Har | 1 | 52 | 1962–1963 | Syndication | Hanna-Barbera | | —N/a | Traditional |
| Liquid Television | 4 | 27 | 1991–1995 | MTV | Colossal Pictures | | TV-14 | Traditional/CGI/Stop-Motion |
| Little Big Awesome | 1 | 13 | 2018 | Amazon Prime Video | Amazon Studios | | TV-Y | Traditional/Live-Action |
| Little Bill | 2 | 52 | 1999–2004 | Nickelodeon | Nickelodeon Animation Studio | | TV-Y | Flash |
| Little Demon | 1 | 10 | 2022 | FXX | ShadowMachine | Canadian co-production | TV-MA | Flash |
| Little Dracula | 1 | 10 | 1991–1999 | Fox Kids | Bandai Entertainment | 3 episodes were left unaired. | TV-Y | Traditional |
| Little Einsteins | 2 | 67 | 2005–2009 | Playhouse Disney | The Baby Einstein Company; Curious Pictures | | TV-Y | Flash |
| Little Ellen | 2 | 20 | 2021–2022 | Cartoonito | Warner Bros. Animation | Seasons 3-4 were left unaired. | TV-Y | Traditional |
| Little Mouse on the Prairie | 1 | 26 | 1996 | Fox Kids | Saban Entertainment | Chinese co-production | —N/a | Traditional |
| Little Muppet Monsters | 1 | 13 | 1985 | CBS | Henson Associates | | —N/a | Traditional/Live-Action |
| Little People | 1 | 52 | 2016–2018 | Sprout | Mattel Television | British-Canadian co-production | TV-Y | CGI |
| Little Rosey | 1 | 18 | 1990–1991 | ABC | Nelvana | Canadian co-production | TV-Y | Traditional |
| Little Shop | 1 | 13 | 1991 | Fox Kids | Saban Entertainment | French co-production | TV-G | Traditional |
| Little Wizards | 1 | 13 | 1987–1988 | ABC | Marvel Productions | | —N/a | Traditional |
| Littlest Pet Shop (1995) | 1 | 40 | 1995 | Syndication | Sunbow Entertainment | French-Canadian co-production | —N/a | Traditional |
| Littlest Pet Shop (2012) | 4 | 104 | 2012–2016 | The Hub Network / Discovery Family | Hasbro Studios | Canadian co-production | TV-Y | Flash |
| Littlest Pet Shop: A World of Our Own | 1 | 52 | 2018–2019 | Discovery Family | Allspark | Irish co-production | TV-Y | Flash |
| Liverspots and Astronots | 1 | 21 | 2018 | Facebook Watch | Cartuna | | TV-MA | Flash |
| Llama Llama | 2 | 25 | 2018–2019 | Netflix | Genius Brands | Irish co-production | TV-Y | Flash |
| Lloyd in Space | 4 | 39 | 2001–2004 | ABC; Toon Disney | Walt Disney Television Animation | | TV-Y7 | Traditional |
| Loafy | 1 | 8 | 2020 | Comedy Central | Cartuna | | TV-MA | Flash |
| Long Ago and Far Away | 4 | 35 | 1989–1992 | PBS | WGBH | | —N/a | Stop-Motion/Live-Action |
| Long Live the Royals | 1 | 4 | 2015 | Cartoon Network | Cartoon Network Studios | | TV-Y7 | Traditional |
| Long Story Short | 1 | 10 | 2025–present | Netflix | ShadowMachine | | TV-14 | Flash |
| Loonatics Unleashed | 2 | 26 | 2006–2008 | Kids' WB | Warner Bros. Animation | | TV-Y7 | Traditional |
| Looney Tunes Cartoons | 6 | 81 | 2020–2023 | HBO Max | Warner Bros. Animation | | TV-Y7 | Traditional |
| Lost Ollie | 1 | 4 | 2022 | Netflix | Industrial Light & Magic | | TV-PG | CGI/Live-Action |
| Lost in Oz | 2 | 26 | 2015–2018 | Amazon Prime Video | Amazon Studios | | TV-Y7 | CGI |
| Love, Death & Robots | 3 | 36 | 2019–present | Netflix | Blur Studio | | TV-MA | Stop-Motion/CGI/Flash |
| Lucas Bros. Moving Co. | 2 | 17 | 2013–2015 | Fox; FXX | ADHD Studios | | TV-MA | Flash |
| Lucky Luke | 1 | 26 | 1984–1985 | Syndication | Hanna-Barbera | French co-production | —N/a | Traditional |
| Lucy, the Daughter of the Devil | 1 | 11 | 2007 | Adult Swim | Williams Street | | TV-MA | CGI |
| Lugar Heights | 1 | 13 | 2001 | mun2 | | | TV-14 | Flash |
| Luna Petunia | 2 | 33 | 2016–2018 | Netflix | Saban Brands | Canadian co-production | TV-Y | CGI/Live-Action |
| Luno the White Stallion | 1 | 17 | 1963–1965 | | Terrytoons | | —N/a | Traditional |
| Lyla in the Loop | 1 | 26 | 2024–present | PBS Kids | Pipeline Studios | Canadian co-production | TV-Y | Flash |

=== M ===
| Title | Seasons | Episodes | Year | Original channel | American company | Note | Age rating | Technique |
|---|---|---|---|---|---|---|---|---|
| M.O.D.O.K. | 1 | 10 | 2021 | Hulu | Stoopid Buddy Stoodios | | TV-MA | Stop-Motion |
| M.A.S.K. | 2 | 75 | 1985–1986 | Syndication | DIC Entertainment | French co-production | TV-Y7 | Traditional |
| Mack & Moxy | 1 | 12 | 2016 | PBS Kids | Georgia Public Broadcasting | | TV-Y | CGI |
| Mad | 3 | 103 | 2010–2013 | Cartoon Network | Warner Bros. Animation | | TV-PG | Traditional/Stop-Motion/CGI/Flash |
| Mad Jack the Pirate | 1 | 20 | 1998–1999 | Fox Kids | Saban Entertainment | | TV-Y | Traditional |
| Madagascar: A Little Wild | 8 | 50 | 2020–2022 | Hulu | DreamWorks Animation Television | | TV-Y | CGI |
| Madeline | 3 | 59 | 1993–2001 | Fox Family; ABC; Disney Channel | DIC Entertainment | Canadian-French co-production | TV-Y | Traditional |
| Magical Girl Friendship Squad | 1 | 6 | 2020 | Syfy | Cartuna | | TV-MA | Flash |
| Magical Girl Friendship Squad: Origins | 1 | 6 | 2020 | Syfy | Cartuna | | TV-MA | Flash |
| Magicampers | 1 | 22 | 2026–present | Disney Jr. | ObieCo | French co-production | TV-Y | CGI |
| Major Lazer | 1 | 11 | 2014–2015 | FXX | ADHD Studios | | TV-MA | Traditional |
| Make Way for Noddy | 2 | 100 | 2002–2006 | PBS Kids | SD Entertainment | British co-production | TV-Y | CGI |
| Making Fiends | 1 | 6 | 2008 | Nicktoons | Nickelodeon Animation Studio | | TV-Y7 | Flash |
| Mama Mirabelle's Home Movies | 1 | 26 | 2007–2008 | PBS Kids | National Geographic Society | British co-production | TV-Y | Flash |
| Mao Mao: Heroes of Pure Heart | 1 | 40 | 2019–2020 | Cartoon Network | Cartoon Network Studios | | TV-Y7 | Flash |
| Marsupilami | 1 | 13 | 1993 | CBS | Walt Disney Television Animation | | TV-Y | Traditional |
| Martha Speaks | 6 | 96 | 2008–2014 | PBS Kids | WGBH | Canadian co-production | TV-Y | Flash |
| Marvel Superheroes: What the--?! | 1 | 108 | 2009 | YouTube | Marvel Entertainment | | —N/a | Stop-Motion |
| Marvel Super Hero Adventures | 4 | 40 | 2017–2020 | Disney Junior | Marvel Animation | | TV-Y | Flash |
| Marvel Zombies | 1 | 4 | 2025–present | Disney+ | Marvel Studios Animation | | TV-MA | Traditional |
| Mary Shelley's Frankenhole | 2 | 20 | 2010–2012 | Adult Swim | Williams Street | | TV-14 | Stop-Motion |
| Mary-Kate and Ashley in Action! | 1 | 26 | 2001–2002 | ABC | DIC Entertainment | | TV-Y7 | Traditional |
| Maryoku Yummy | 1 | 26 | 2010 | The Hub | American Greetings | | TV-Y | Flash |
| Masters of the Universe: Revelation | 1 | 10 | 2021 | Netflix | Powerhouse Animation Studios | | TV-Y7 | Traditional |
| Mating Season | 1 | 10 | 2026 | Netflix | Titmouse, Inc. | | TV-MA | Traditional |
| Matty's Funday Funnies | 1 | 26 | 1959–1961 | ABC | Harvey Films | | —N/a | Traditional |
| Max & the Midknights | 4 | 40 | 2024–2026 | Nickelodeon | Nickelodeon Animation Studio | | TV-Y7 | CGI |
| Maxie's World | 1 | 32 | 1987 | Syndication | DIC Entertainment | | TV-Y7 | Traditional |
| Max Steel (2000) | 3 | 35 | 2000–2002 | Kids' WB | Mattel Television | Canadian co-production | TV-Y7 | CGI |
| Max Steel (2013) | 2 | 52 | 2013–2014 | Disney XD (season 1); Netflix (season 2) | Mattel Television | Canadian co-production | TV-Y7 | CGI |
| Maya & Miguel | 5 | 65 | 2004–2007 | PBS Kids Go! | Scholastic Productions | | TV-Y | Traditional |
| Maya and the Three | 1 | 9 | 2021 | Netflix | Netflix Animation | Mexican co-production | TV-Y7 | CGI |
| McGee and Me! | 1 | 12 | 1989–1995 | Syndication | Tyndale Productions | | TV-G | Traditional/Live-Action |
| Meatballs & Spaghetti | 1 | 25 | 1982–1983 | CBS | Marvel Productions | | —N/a | Traditional |
| Mech Cadets | 1 | 10 | 2023 | Netflix | Polygon Pictures | Japanese co-production | TV-Y7 | CGI |
| Mecha Builders | 1 | 26 | 2022–2023 | Cartoonito | Sesame Workshop | | TV-Y | CGI |
| MechWest | 1 | 4 | 2024–present | Angel Studios | AnimSchool Studios | | TV-Y7 | CGI |
| Meet Spidey and His Amazing Friends | 5 | 52 | 2021–present | Disney Junior | Marvel Animation | | TV-Y7 | CGI |
| Mega Babies | 1 | 26 | 1999–2000 | Fox Family | Sony Wonder Television | Canadian co-production | TV-Y7 | Traditional |
| Mega Man | 1 | 27 | 1994–1996 | Syndication | Ruby-Spears Enterprises | Canadian-Japanese co-production | TV-Y7 | Traditional |
| Mega Man: Fully Charged | 1 | 52 | 2018–2019 | Cartoon Network | Dentsu Entertainment USA | Canadian-Japanese co-production | TV-Y7 | CGI |
| Megas XLR | 2 | 26 | 2004–2005 | Cartoon Network | Cartoon Network Studios | | TV-Y7 | Traditional |
| Megamind Rules! | 1 | 8 | 2024 | Peacock | DreamWorks Animation Television | | TV-Y7 | CGI |
| Mel-O-Toons | 1 | 104 | 1959–1960 | Syndication | United Artists Television | | —N/a | Traditional |
| Men in Black: The Series | 4 | 53 | 1997–2001 | Kids' WB | Adelaide Productions | | TV-Y7 | Traditional |
| Merrie Melodies Starring Bugs Bunny & Friends | 1 | 65 | 1990–1994 | Syndication; Fox Kids | Warner Bros. Animation | | —N/a | Traditional |
| Metalocalypse | 4 | 61 | 2006–2013 | Adult Swim | Williams Street | | TV-MA | Flash |
| Meteor and the Mighty Monster Trucks | 1 | 26 | 2006–2008 | Discovery Kids | Endgame Entertainment | Canadian co-production | TV-Y | CGI |
| Mickey Mouse | 5 | 96 | 2013–2019 | Disney Channel | Disney Television Animation | | TV-G | Flash |
| Mickey Mouse Clubhouse | 4 | 125 | 2006–2016 | Playhouse Disney | Disney Television Animation | | TV-Y | CGI |
| Mickey Mouse Clubhouse+ | 1 | 20 | 2025–present | Disney Jr. | Disney Television Animation | | TV-Y | CGI |
| Mickey Mouse Funhouse | 3 | 86 | 2021–2025 | Disney Junior | Disney Television Animation | | TV-Y | CGI |
| Mickey Mouse: Hot Diggity-Dog Tales | 1 | 18 | 2019–2021 | Disney Junior | Disney Television Animation | | TV-Y | CGI |
| Mickey Mouse Mixed-Up Adventures | 3 | 87 | 2017–2021 | Disney Junior | Disney Television Animation | | TV-Y | CGI |
| Mickey Mouse Works | 2 | 25 | 1999–2000 | ABC | Walt Disney Television Animation | | TV-Y | Traditional |
| Mickey's Mouse Tracks | 1 | 77 | 1992–1995 | The Disney Channel | Walt Disney Productions | | —N/a | Traditional |
| Mickey's Mousekersize | 1 | 10 | 2011 | Disney Junior | Disney Television Animation | | TV-Y | CGI |
| Middle School Moguls | 1 | 4 | 2019 | Nickelodeon | Nickelodeon Animation Studio | | TV-Y7 | CGI |
| Middlemost Post | 2 | 33 | 2021–2022 | Nickelodeon | Nickelodeon Animation Studio | | TV-Y7 | Traditional |
| Midnight Patrol: Adventures in the Dream Zone | 1 | 13 | 1990 | Syndication | Hanna-Barbera | British co-production | TV-G | Traditional |
| Mighty Ducks: The Animated Series | 1 | 26 | 1996–1997 | ABC | Walt Disney Television Animation | | TV-Y | Traditional |
| Mighty Magiswords | 2 | 92 | 2016–2019 | Cartoon Network | Cartoon Network Studios | | TV-Y7 | Flash |
| Mighty Man and Yukk | 1 | 32 | 1980–1981 | ABC | Ruby-Spears Enterprises | | —N/a | Traditional |
| Mighty Max | 2 | 40 | 1993–1994 | Syndication | Film Roman | British-French co-production | TV-Y7 | Traditional |
| Mighty MonsterWheelies | 2 | 52 | 2024–2025 | Netflix | DreamWorks Television Animation | | TV-Y | CGI |
| Mighty Mouse Playhouse | 11 | 80 | 1955–1967 | CBS | Terrytoons | | TV-Y7 | Traditional |
| Mighty Mouse: The New Adventures | 1 | 19 | 1987–1988 | CBS | Bakshi Animation | | TV-Y7 | Traditional |
| Mighty Orbots | 1 | 13 | 1984 | ABC | MGM Television | Japanese co-production | —N/a | Traditional |
| Mike, Lu & Og | 2 | 26 | 1999–2000 | Cartoon Network | Kinofilm | Russian co-production | TV-G | Traditional |
| Mike Judge Presents: Tales from the Tour Bus | 2 | 16 | 2017–2018 | Cinemax | Judgemental Films; Zipper Bros Films | | TV-MA | Traditional/Live-Action |
| Mike Tyson Mysteries | 4 | 70 | 2014–2020 | Adult Swim | Warner Bros. Animation; Williams Street | | TV-14 | Traditional |
| Miles from Tomorrowland | 3 | 75 | 2015–2018 | Disney Junior | Wild Canary Animation | | TV-Y | CGI |
| Milo Murphy's Law | 2 | 40 | 2016–2019 | Disney XD (season 1); Disney Channel (season 2) | Disney Television Animation | | TV-Y7 | Traditional |
| Milton the Monster | 1 | 26 | 1965–1968 | ABC | Hal Seeger Productions | | TV-G | Traditional |
| Mina and the Count | 1 | 6 | 1995–1999 | Nickelodeon | Frederator Studios | | TV-Y7 | Traditional |
| Minnie's Bow-Toons | 9 | 120 | 2011–present | Disney Junior | Disney Television Animation | | TV-Y | CGI |
| Minoriteam | 1 | 19 | 2006 | Adult Swim | Williams Street | | TV-MA | Flash |
| Mira, Royal Detective | 2 | 54 | 2020–2022 | Disney Junior | Wild Canary Animation | | TV-Y | CGI |
| Mission Hill | 1 | 13 | 1999–2001 | The WB; Adult Swim | Castle Rock Entertainment | | TV-14 | Traditional |
| Mission: Magic! | 1 | 16 | 1973 | ABC | Filmation | | —N/a | Traditional |
| Mister Magoo | 1 | 130 | 1960–1962 | Syndication | United Productions of America | | —N/a | Traditional |
| Mister T | 1 | 30 | 1983–1985 | NBC | Ruby-Spears Enterprises | | TV-G | Traditional |
| Misterjaw | 1 | 34 | 1976–1977 | NBC | DePatie–Freleng Enterprises | | —N/a | Traditional |
| Mixels | 2 | 26 | 2014–2016 | Cartoon Network | The Lego Group; Cartoon Network Studios | | TV-Y7 | Traditional/Flash |
| Moby Dick and Mighty Mightor | 1 | 18 | 1967–1968 | CBS | Hanna-Barbera | | TV-Y7 | Traditional |
| Molly of Denali | 4 | 67 | 2019–present | PBS Kids | WGBH | Canadian co-production | TV-Y | Flash |
| Momma Named Me Sheriff | 2 | 19 | 2019–2021 | Adult Swim | Williams Street | | TV-MA | Flash |
| Monchhichis | 1 | 13 | 1983 | ABC | Hanna-Barbera | | TV-Y | Traditional |
| Mongo Wrestling Alliance | 1 | 10 | 2011 | Adult Swim | Mirari Films; Williams Street | | TV-MA | Flash |
| Monsters at Work | 2 | 20 | 2021–present | Disney+ | Disney Television Animation | | TV-G | CGI |
| Monsters vs. Aliens | 1 | 26 | 2013–2014 | Nickelodeon | DreamWorks Animation; Nickelodeon Animation Studio | | TV-Y7 | CGI |
| Monster Farm | 1 | 13 | 1998–1999 | Fox Family | Saban Entertainment | | TV-G | Traditional |
| Monster Force | 1 | 13 | 1994 | Syndication | Universal Cartoon Studios | Canadian co-production | —N/a | Traditional |
| Monster High | 2 | 46 | 2022–2024 | Nickelodeon | Nickelodeon Animation Studio | | TV-Y7 | CGI |
| Monster High (web series) | 7 | 175 | 2010–2018 | YouTube | Mattel Television | | —N/a | Flash |
| Monster Mania | 1 | 26 | 1995–1996 | Syndication | Hallmark Entertainment; Kookanooga Toons | | —N/a | Traditional |
| Monsuno | 2 | 65 | 2012–2014 | Nicktoons | Topps Animation | Japanese co-production | TV-Y7 | Traditional |
| Moonbeam City | 1 | 10 | 2015 | Comedy Central | Titmouse, Inc. | | TV-MA | Flash |
| MoonDreamers | 1 | 16 | 1986–1987 | Syndication | Sunbow Productions | | TV-G | Traditional |
| Moon Girl and Devil Dinosaur | 2 | 41 | 2023–2025 | Disney Channel | Marvel Animation | | TV-Y7 | Traditional |
| Moral Orel | 4 | 40 | 2005–2008 | Adult Swim | ShadowMachine; Williams Street | | TV-MA | Stop-Motion |
| Mork & Mindy/Laverne & Shirley/Fonz Hour | 1 | 27 | 1982–1983 | ABC | Hanna-Barbera | | TV-G | Traditional |
| Mortal Kombat: Defenders of the Realm | 1 | 13 | 1996 | USA Network | Film Roman | | TV-Y7 | Traditional |
| Mother Goose and Grimm | 1 | 26 | 1991–1992 | CBS | Film Roman | | TV-G | Traditional |
| Mother Up! | 1 | 13 | 2013–2014 | Hulu | Broadway Video | Canadian co-production | TV-14 | Flash |
| Motorcity | 1 | 20 | 2012–2013 | Disney XD | Disney Television Animation | | TV-Y7 | Flash |
| Motormouse and Autocat | 1 | 34 | 1969–1971 | ABC | Hanna-Barbera | | TV-G | Traditional |
| Motown Magic | 2 | 51 | 2018–2019 | Netflix | PolyGram Entertainment | Australian co-production | TV-Y | CGI |
| Mouseterpiece Theater | 1 | 60 | 1983–1990 | The Disney Channel | Walt Disney Television Animation | | —N/a | Traditional |
| Mr. Birchum | 1 | 6 | 2024 | DailyWire+ | Chassy Media | | TV-MA | Traditional |
| Mr. Bogus | 3 | 43 | 1991–1993 | Syndication | Zodiac Entertainment | | TV-Y | Traditional |
| Mr. Pickles | 4 | 32 | 2013–2019 | Adult Swim | Williams Street | | TV-MA | Flash |
| Mulligan | 1 | 20 | 2023–2024 | Netflix | Bento Box Entertainment | | TV-14 | Flash |
| Mummies Alive! | 1 | 42 | 1997 | Syndication | DIC Entertainment | Canadian co-production | TV-Y7 | Traditional |
| Muppet Babies (1984) | 8 | 107 | 1984–1991 | CBS | Henson Associates | | TV-Y | Traditional |
| Muppet Babies (2018) | 3 | 71 | 2018–2022 | Disney Junior | The Muppets Studio | | TV-Y | CGI |
| Mutant League | 2 | 40 | 1994–1996 | Syndication | Claster Television | | TV-Y7 | Traditional |
| My Adventures with Superman | 3 | 30 | 2023–present | Adult Swim | DC Studios | | TV-PG | Traditional |
| My Dad the Bounty Hunter | 2 | 19 | 2023 | Netflix | Netflix Animation | | TV-Y7 | CGI |
| My Friends Tigger & Pooh | 3 | 63 | 2007–2010 | Playhouse Disney | Walt Disney Television Animation | | TV-Y | CGI |
| My Gym Partner's a Monkey | 4 | 56 | 2005–2008 | Cartoon Network | Cartoon Network Studios | | TV-Y7 | Traditional |
| My Life as a Teenage Robot | 4 | 40 | 2003–2009 | Nickelodeon | Frederator Studios; Nickelodeon Animation Studio | Season 3 aired on Nicktoons Network. | TV-Y7 | Traditional |
| My Little Pony | 2 | 65 | 1986–1987 | Syndication | Sunbow Productions | | TV-Y | Traditional |
| My Little Pony Tales | 1 | 26 | 1992 | The Disney Channel | Sunbow Productions | | TV-Y | Traditional |
| My Little Pony: Equestria Girls | 2 | 70 | 2017–2020 | YouTube | Hasbro Studios | Canadian co-production | —N/a | Flash |
| My Little Pony: Equestria Girls - Summertime Shorts | 1 | 16 | 2017 | Discovery Family | Hasbro Studios | Irish co-production | TV-Y7 | Flash |
| My Little Pony: Friendship Is Magic | 9 | 221 | 2010–2019 | The Hub Network / Discovery Family | Hasbro Studios | Canadian co-production | TV-Y | Flash |
| My Little Pony: Make Your Mark | 4 | 27 | 2022–2023 | Netflix | Hasbro Studios | Canadian co-production | TV-Y | CGI |
| My Little Pony: Pony Life | 2 | 40 | 2020–2021 | Discovery Family | Hasbro Studios | Irish co-production | TV-Y7 | Flash |
| My World and Welcome to It | 1 | 26 | 1969–1970 | NBC | Sheldon Leonard Productions | | —N/a | Traditional/Live-action |
| Mysticons | 2 | 40 | 2017–2018 | Nickelodeon; Nicktoons | Topps Animation | Canadian co-production | TV-Y7 | Flash |

=== N ===
| Title | Seasons | Episodes | Year | Original channel | American company | Note | Age rating | Technique |
|---|---|---|---|---|---|---|---|---|
| Napoleon Dynamite | 1 | 6 | 2012 | Fox | Scully Productions | | TV-14 | Traditional |
| NASCAR Racers | 2 | 26 | 1999–2001 | Fox Kids | Saban Entertainment | Canadian co-production | TV-Y7 | Traditional |
| Nature Cat | 5 | 93 | 2015–2024 | PBS Kids | Spiffy Pictures; WTTW | Canadian co-production | TV-Y | Flash |
| Neighbors from Hell | 1 | 10 | 2010 | TBS | DreamWorks Animation Television | | TV-14 | Flash |
| Nella the Princess Knight | 2 | 68 | 2017–2021 | Nickelodeon | Nickelodeon Animation Studio | Season 1, Episodes 24-48 and Season 2 aired on Nick Jr. Channel (2018–2019) and the last 3 episodes of Season 2 aired on Paramount+ (2021). | TV-Y | Flash |
| Neo Yokio | 1 | 6 | 2017–2019 | Netflix | Friends Night | Japanese co-production | TV-MA | Traditional |
| New Kids on the Block | 1 | 15 | 1990 | ABC | DIC Entertainment | | TV-Y7 | Traditional |
| New Looney Tunes | 3 | 156 | 2015–2020 | Cartoon Network; Boomerang | Warner Bros. Animation | | TV-Y7 | Traditional |
| NFL Rush Zone | 3 | 60 | 2010–2014 | Nicktoons | NFL Films | | TV-Y7 | Traditional |
| Ni Hao, Kai-Lan | 3 | 42 | 2008–2011 | Nickelodeon | Nickelodeon Animation Studio | | TV-Y | Traditional |
| Ni Ni's Treehouse | 3 | 65 | 2000–2003 | TLC | The Itsy Bitsy Entertainment Company | British co-production | TV-G | Traditional/Live-Action |
| Nicktoons Film Festival | 6 | 114 | 2004–2009 | Nicktoons Network | Frederator Studios | | TV-G | Traditional/Flash/CGI/Stop-Motion |
| Nightmare Ned | 1 | 25 | 1997 | ABC | Walt Disney Television Animation | | TV-Y7 | Traditional |
| Niko and the Sword of Light | 1 | 23 | 2017–2019 | Amazon Prime Video | Amazon Studios | | TV-Y7 | Flash |
| Nina Needs to Go! | 1 | 20 | 2014–2015 | Disney Junior | Disney Television Animation | British co-production | TV-Y | Flash |
| Nina's Little Fables | 1 | 24 | 2010–2013 | PBS Kids Sprout | Spacetoonz | | TV-Y | Flash |
| Nina's World | 2 | 52 | 2015–2018 | Sprout / Universal Kids | Sprout Originals | Canadian co-production | TV-Y | Flash |
| No Activity | 1 | 8 | 2021 | Paramount+ | Flight School Studio | Season 4 only. | TV-14 | CGI |
| Noddy, Toyland Detective | 2 | 104 | 2016–2020 | Sprout / Universal Kids | DreamWorks Animation Television | British-French co-production | TV-Y | CGI |
| Nomad of Nowhere | 1 | 12 | 2018 | Rooster Teeth | Otter Media | | TV-14 | Traditional |
| Norman Picklestripes | 1 | 23 | 2019–2021 | Universal Kids | Factory | British-Canadian co-production | TV-Y | Stop-Motion |
| Number 1 Happy Family USA | 1 | 8 | 2025–present | Amazon Prime Video | Amazon MGM Studios | | TV-14 | Flash |

=== O ===
| Title | Seasons | Episodes | Year | Original channel | American company | Note | Age rating | Technique |
|---|---|---|---|---|---|---|---|---|
| O'Grady | 2 | 19 | 2004–2006 | The N | Soup2Nuts | | TV-PG | Flash |
| Oddballs | 2 | 20 | 2022–2023 | Netflix | Netflix Animation | Canadian co-production | TV-Y7 | Flash |
| Off to See the Wizard | 1 | 26 | 1967–1968 | ABC | MGM Animation/Visual Arts | | —N/a | Traditional |
| Off the Air | 5 | 46 | 2011–present | Adult Swim | Williams Street | | TV-MA | CGI/Flash/Live-action |
| Office Ladies: The Animated Series | 1 | 10 | 2021 | Comedy Central | Cartuna | | TV-MA | Flash |
| Oh My God... Yes! A Series of Extremely Relatable Circumstances | 1 | 10 | 2025–present | Adult Swim | Williams Street | | TV-MA | Flash |
| Oh Yeah! Cartoons | 3 | 34 | 1998–2001 | Nickelodeon | Frederator Studios | | TV-Y | Traditional |
| Olivia | 2 | 40 | 2009–2015 | Nickelodeon | Brown Bag Films | British-Irish co-production | TV-Y | CGI |
| OK K.O.! Let's Be Heroes | 3 | 112 | 2017–2019 | Cartoon Network | Cartoon Network Studios | | TV-Y7 | Traditional |
| Olaf Presents | 1 | 5 | 2021 | Disney+ | Walt Disney Animation Studios | | TV-G | CGI |
| Ollie & Scoops | 1 | 10 | 2019–present | YouTube | Nico Animation, LLC | | TV-Y7 | Flash |
| Oni: Thunder God's Tale | 1 | 9 | 2022 | Netflix | Netflix Animation | Japanese co-production | TV-14 | CGI |
| Open Season: Call of Nature | 1 | 52 | 2023–present | Disney Channel | Sony Pictures Animation | Canadian co-production | TV-Y7 | Flash |
| Oswald | 1 | 26 | 2001–2003 | Nickelodeon | Nickelodeon Animation Studio | British co-production | TV-Y | Traditional |
| Our Cartoon President | 2 | 46 | 2018–2020 | Showtime | CBS Eye Animation Productions | | TV-MA | Flash |
| Out of Jimmy's Head | 1 | 20 | 2007–2008 | Cartoon Network | Cartoon Network Studios | | TV-Y7 | Flash/Live-action |
| Out There | 1 | 10 | 2013 | IFC | Quincy Productions | | TV-MA | Flash |
| Outer Space Astronauts | 1 | 5 | 2009 | Syfy | Russell Barrett Productions | | —N/a | CGI/Live-action |
| Over the Garden Wall | 1 | 10 | 2014 | Cartoon Network | Cartoon Network Studios | | TV-PG | Traditional |
| Ozzy & Drix | 2 | 26 | 2002–2004 | Kids' WB | Warner Bros. Animation | | TV-Y7 | Traditional |

=== P ===
| Title | Seasons | Episodes | Year | Original channel | American company | Note | Age rating | Technique |
|---|---|---|---|---|---|---|---|---|
| P. King Duckling | 2 | 78 | 2016–2017 | Disney Junior | Little Airplane Productions | Chinese co-production | TV-Y | Flash |
| Pac-Man | 2 | 42 | 1982–1983 | ABC | Hanna-Barbera | | TV-G | Traditional |
| Pac-Man and the Ghostly Adventures | 3 | 52 | 2013–2015 | Disney XD | 41 Entertainment; Sprite Animation Studios | Canadian-Japanese co-production | TV-Y7 | CGI |
| Packages from Planet X | 1 | 26 | 2013–2014 | Disney XD | American Greetings | Canadian co-production | TV-Y7 | Flash |
| Paddington Bear | 1 | 13 | 1989–1990 | Syndication | Hanna-Barbera | British co-production | TV-G | Traditional |
| Pandamonium | 1 | 13 | 1982 | CBS | Marvel Productions | | —N/a | Traditional |
| Pantheon | 1 | 8 | 2022 | AMC+ | Titmouse, Inc. | | TV-14 | Traditional |
| Paradise PD | 4 | 40 | 2018–2022 | Netflix | Damn! Show Productions | | TV-MA | Traditional |
| Paranormal Action Squad | 1 | 8 | 2016 | YouTube Premium | Pickaxe Productions | | TV-MA | Flash |
| Partridge Family 2200 A.D. | 1 | 16 | 1974 | CBS | Hanna-Barbera | | —N/a | Traditional |
| Party Legends | 1 | 14 | 2016–2017 | Viceland | Field Recordings | | TV-MA | Flash/Live-Action |
| Paw Paws | 1 | 21 | 1985–1986 | Syndication | Hanna-Barbera | | TV-Y | Traditional |
| PB&J Otter | 3 | 65 | 1998–2000 | Playhouse Disney | Jumbo Pictures; Walt Disney Television Animation | | TV-Y | Traditional |
| Peanuts | 1 | 37 | 2014–2016 | Boomerang | Peanuts Worldwide | French co-production | TV-G | Flash |
| Peep and the Big Wide World | 5 | 60 | 2004–2011 | Discovery Kids | WGBH | Canadian co-production. Seasons 4-5 aired on select local PBS Kids stations. | TV-Y | Flash |
| Peg + Cat | 2 | 63 | 2013–2018 | PBS Kids | Fred Rogers Productions | Canadian co-production | TV-Y | Flash |
| Penn Zero: Part-Time Hero | 2 | 35 | 2014–2017 | Disney XD | Disney Television Animation | | TV-Y7 | Flash |
| Pepper Ann | 5 | 65 | 1997–2000 | ABC | Walt Disney Television Animation | | TV-Y | Traditional |
| Perfect Hair Forever | 3 | 9 | 2004–2007, 2014 | Adult Swim | Williams Street | | TV-14 | Traditional |
| Pet Alien | 2 | 52 | 2005 | Cartoon Network (Season 1) kabillion (season 2) | Mike Young Productions | | TV-Y7 | CGI |
| Pete the Cat | 2 | 39 | 2018–2022 | Amazon Prime Video | Amazon Studios | | TV-Y | Flash |
| Peter Rabbit | 2 | 56 | 2012–2016 | Nickelodeon | Silvergate Media | British-Irish co-production | TV-Y | CGI |
| Phantom 2040 | 1 | 35 | 1994–1996 | Syndication | | French co-production | TV-Y7 | Traditional |
| Phantom Investigators | 1 | 13 | 2002 | Kids' WB | Adelaide Productions | | TV-Y7 | Traditional |
| Phineas and Ferb | 5 | 250 | 2007–2015, 2025–present | Disney Channel | Disney Television Animation | | TV-G | Traditional |
| Phoebe & Jay | 1 | 26 | 2026–present | PBS Kids | Phoebe & Jay Productions | Canadian co-production | TV-Y | Flash |
| Phred on Your Head Show | 2 | 31 | 1999–2001 | Noggin | MTV Animation; Possible Worlds | | TV-Y | Flash |
| Pickle and Peanut | 2 | 42 | 2015–2018 | Disney XD | Disney Television Animation | | TV-Y7 | Flash |
| Pig Goat Banana Cricket | 2 | 40 | 2015–2018 | Nickelodeon | Nickelodeon Animation Studio | Season 1, Episodes 21-30 and Season 2 aired on Nicktoons. | TV-Y7 | Flash |
| Piggsburg Pigs! | 1 | 13 | 1990 | Fox Children's Network | Ruby-Spears Enterprises | Canadian co-production | TV-Y | Traditional |
| Pinecone & Pony | 2 | 16 | 2022–2023 | Apple TV+ | DreamWorks Animation Television | Canadian co-production | TV-Y7 | Flash |
| Pink Panther and Pals | 1 | 26 | 2010 | Cartoon Network | Rubicon Studios | The last 8 episodes aired on Boomerang. | TV-Y7 | Traditional |
| Pink Panther and Sons | 1 | 13 | 1984–1986 | NBC | Mirisch-Geoffrey-DePatie-Freleng | | TV-Y | Traditional |
| Pinkalicious & Peterrific | 5 | 69 | 2018–present | PBS Kids | WGBH | British co-production | TV-Y | Flash |
| Pinky and the Brain | 3 | 65 | 1995–1998 | Kids' WB | Warner Bros. Animation | | TV-Y | Traditional |
| Pinky Dinky Doo | 2 | 52 | 2006–2011 | Noggin | Sesame Workshop; Cartoon Pizza | Canadian co-production | TV-Y | Flash |
| Pinky, Elmyra & the Brain | 1 | 13 | 1998–1999 | Kids' WB | Warner Bros. Animation | | TV-Y | Traditional |
| Pinky Malinky | 3 | 60 | 2019 | Netflix | Nickelodeon Animation Studio | | TV-Y7 | Flash |
| Pixie and Dixie and Mr. Jinks | 1 | 57 | 1958–1961 | Syndication | Hanna-Barbera | | TV-G | Traditional |
| PJ Masks | 6 | 151 | 2015–present | Disney Junior | Hasbro Entertainment | British-French co-production | TV-Y | CGI |
| Planet Sheen | 1 | 26 | 2010–2013 | Nickelodeon | Omation Animation Studio; Nickelodeon Animation Studio | The last 15 episodes aired on Nicktoons. | TV-Y7 | CGI |
| Playboy's Dark Justice | 1 | 20 | 2000–2001 | Playboy TV | Playboy Enterprises | | TV-MA | CGI |
| Playdate with Winnie the Pooh | 1 | 2 | 2023–present | Disney Junior | Disney Television Animation | | TV-Y | CGI |
| Pocket Dragon Adventures | 1 | 52 | 1996–1997 | Syndication | DIC Entertainment | Spanish co-production | TV-Y | Traditional |
| Pokémon Concierge | 1 | 4 | 2023–present | Netflix | The Pokémon Company | Japanese co-production | TV-Y7 | Stop-motion |
| Pole Position | 1 | 13 | 1984 | CBS | DIC Entertainment | | TV-Y7 | Traditional |
| Police Academy | 2 | 65 | 1988–1990 | Syndication | Ruby-Spears Enterprises | Canadian co-production | TV-Y7 | Traditional |
| Polly Pocket | 4 | 117 | 2018–present | Universal Kids; Netflix | Mattel Television | Canadian co-production | TV-Y7 | Flash |
| Poochini | 1 | 26 | 2000–2002 | Syndication | WildBrain Entertainment | | TV-Y7 | Traditional |
| Popeye and Son | 1 | 26 | 1987 | CBS | Hanna-Barbera | | TV-Y | Traditional |
| Popeye the Sailor | 1 | 220 | 1960–1963 | Syndication | King Features Syndicate | | —N/a | Traditional |
| Popples (1986) | 1 | 44 | 1986–1987 | Syndication | DIC Entertainment | | TV-Y | Traditional |
| Popples (2015) | 1 | 26 | 2015–2016 | Netflix | Saban Brands | French co-production | TV-Y | CGI |
| Popzilla | 1 | 12 | 2009 | MTV | Animax Entertainment; MTV Animation | | TV-14 | Flash |
| Posse Impossible | 1 | 13 | 1977 | NBC | Hanna-Barbera | | TV-G | Traditional |
| Postcards from Buster | 4 | 55 | 2004–2012 | PBS Kids Go! | Marc Brown Studios; WGBH | | TV-Y | Traditional |
| Potato Head Kids | 1 | 23 | 1986–1987 | Syndication | Sunbow Entertainment | | TV-Y | Traditional |
| Pound Puppies (1986) | 1 | 36 | 1986–1987 | ABC | Hanna-Barbera | | TV-G | Traditional |
| Pound Puppies (2010) | 3 | 65 | 2010–2013 | The Hub Network | Hasbro Studios | Canadian co-production | TV-Y | Flash |
| Power Players | 1 | 78 | 2019–2020 | Cartoon Network | Man of Action Entertainment | French co-production | TV-Y7 | CGI |
| Powerbirds | 1 | 20 | 2020 | Universal Kids | Brown Bag Films | Irish co-production | TV-Y | Flash |
| Praise Petey | 1 | 10 | 2023 | Freeform | ShadowMachine | | TV-14 | Flash |
| Precious Pupp | 1 | 26 | 1965–1967 | NBC | Hanna-Barbera | | TV-G | Traditional |
| President Curtis | 1 | 10 | 2026–present | Adult Swim | Williams Street | | TV-MA | Traditional |
| Pretzel and the Puppies | 1 | 18 | 2022–present | Apple TV+ | HarperCollins Productions | | TV-Y | CGI |
| Primal | 2 | 20 | 2019–present | Adult Swim | Cartoon Network Studios; Williams Street | | TV-MA | Traditional |
| Primos | 1 | 13 | 2024–present | Disney Channel | Disney Television Animation | | TV-Y7 | Traditional |
| Princess Gwenevere and the Jewel Riders | 1 | 26 | 1995–1996 | Syndication | Bohbot Entertainment | | TV-Y | Traditional |
| Princess Power | 3 | 45 | 2023–2024 | Netflix | Flower Films | | TV-Y | CGI |
| Problem Child | 2 | 26 | 1993–1994 | USA Network | Universal Cartoon Studios | Spanish co-production (season 1) and Canadian co-production (season 2) | TV-Y7 | Traditional |
| Project G.e.e.K.e.R. | 1 | 13 | 1996 | CBS | Adelaide Productions | | TV-Y7 | Traditional |
| ProStars | 1 | 13 | 1991 | NBC | DIC Entertainment | | TV-Y7 | Traditional |
| Puffin Rock | 2 | 26 | 2015–2016 | Netflix | Penguin Random House | British-Irish co-production | TV-Y | Flash |
| Punkin' Puss & Mushmouse | 1 | 23 | 1964–1966 | Syndication | Hanna-Barbera | | TV-G | Traditional |
| Puppy Dog Pals | 5 | 116 | 2017–2023 | Disney Junior | Wild Canary Animation | | TV-Y | CGI |
| Pupstruction | 2 | 50 | 2023–present | Disney Junior | Titmouse, Inc. | | TV-Y | CGI |

=== Q ===
| Title | Seasons | Episodes | Year | Original channel | American company | Note | Age rating | Technique |
|---|---|---|---|---|---|---|---|---|
| Q-Force | 1 | 10 | 2021 | Netflix | Titmouse, Inc. | | TV-MA | Flash |
| Q. T. Hush | 1 | 100 | 1960–1961 | Syndication | Animation Associates | | —N/a | Traditional |
| Quack Pack | 1 | 39 | 1996 | Syndication | Walt Disney Television Animation | | TV-Y | Traditional |
| Queer Duck | 1 | 20 | 2000–2002 | Showtime | Icebox | | TV-MA | Flash |

=== R ===
| Title | Seasons | Episodes | Year | Original channel | American company | Note | Age rating | Technique |
|---|---|---|---|---|---|---|---|---|
| Rabbids Invasion | 4 | 104 | 2013–2018 | Nickelodeon; Nicktoons | Ubisoft | French co-production | TV-Y7 | CGI |
| Raggs | 2 | 65 | 2008–2009 | PBS Kids | Raggs LLC | Australian co-production | TV-Y | CGI/Live-action |
| Rainbow Brite (1984) | 1 | 13 | 1984–1986 | Syndication | DIC Entertainment | | TV-G | Traditional |
| Rainbow Brite (2014) | 1 | 3 | 2014 | Feeln | | | TV-Y7 | Traditional |
| Rainbow Butterfly Unicorn Kitty | 1 | 26 | 2019 | Nickelodeon; Nicktoons | Funrise Toys | Canadian co-production | TV-Y7 | Flash |
| Rainbow Rangers | 2 | 52 | 2018–2021 | Nick Jr. Channel | Genius Brands | Irish co-production | TV-Y | CGI |
| Rambo: The Force of Freedom | 1 | 65 | 1986 | Syndication | Ruby-Spears Enterprises | | TV-Y7 | Traditional |
| Randy Cunningham: 9th Grade Ninja | 2 | 50 | 2012–2015 | Disney XD | Titmouse, Inc | British co-production | TV-Y7 | Flash |
| Rapunzel's Tangled Adventure | 3 | 60 | 2017–2020 | Disney Channel | Disney Television Animation | | TV-Y7 | Flash |
| Random! Cartoons | 1 | 13 | 2008–2009 | Nicktoons Network | Frederator Studios | | TV-Y7 | CGI/Traditional/Flash |
| Raw Toonage | 1 | 12 | 1992 | CBS | Walt Disney Television Animation | | TV-Y | Traditional |
| Ready Jet Go! | 2 | 66 | 2016–2019 | PBS Kids | Wind Dancer Films; Snee-Oosh, Inc. | Canadian co-production | TV-Y | CGI |
| Recess | 6 | 65 | 1997–2001 | ABC | Walt Disney Television Animation | | TV-Y | Traditional |
| Red Planet | 1 | 3 | 1994 | Fox Kids | | | TV-Y7 | Traditional |
| Regular Show | 8 | 261 | 2010–2017 | Cartoon Network | Cartoon Network Studios | | TV-PG | Traditional |
| Regular Show: The Lost Tapes | 1 | 40 | 2026–present | Cartoon Network | Cartoon Network Studios | | TV-PG | Traditional |
| Ren & Stimpy "Adult Party Cartoon" | 1 | 3 | 2003 | Spike | Spümcø | | TV-MA | Traditional |
| Return to the Planet of the Apes | 1 | 13 | 1975 | NBC | DePatie–Freleng Enterprises | | —N/a | Traditional |
| Rhyme Time Town | 2 | 21 | 2020–2021 | Netflix | DreamWorks Animation Television | | TV-Y | Traditional |
| Ribert and Robert's Wonderworld | 3 | 78 | 2005–2008 | PBS Kids | Deos Animation Studios | | TV-Y | CGI/Live-action |
| Richie Rich (1980) | 4 | 41 | 1980–1984 | ABC | Hanna-Barbera | | TV-G | Traditional |
| Richie Rich (1996) | 1 | 13 | 1996 | Syndication | Harvey Films | | TV-Y | Traditional |
| Rick and Morty | 9 | 91 | 2013–present | Adult Swim | Williams Street | | TV-14 | Traditional |
| Rick and Morty: The Anime | 1 | 10 | 2024 | Adult Swim | Williams Street | Japanese co-production | TV-14 | Traditional |
| Rick & Steve: The Happiest Gay Couple in All the World | 2 | 14 | 2007–2009 | Logo TV | Cuppa Coffee Studios | Canadian co-production | TV-14 | Stop-motion |
| Rickety Rocket | 1 | 16 | 1979–1980 | ABC | Ruby-Spears Enterprises | | —N/a | Traditional |
| Ricochet Rabbit & Droop-a-Long | 1 | 23 | 1964–1966 | Syndication | Hanna-Barbera | | TV-G | Traditional |
| Ridley Jones | 5 | 35 | 2021–2023 | Netflix | Netflix Animation | Irish co-production | TV-Y | CGI |
| Right Now Kapow | 1 | 26 | 2016–2017 | Disney XD | Warner Bros. Animation | | TV-Y7 | Flash |
| Ring Raiders | 1 | 5 | 1989 | Syndication | DIC Entertainment | | —N/a | Traditional |
| Rise of the Teenage Mutant Ninja Turtles | 2 | 39 | 2018–2020 | Nickelodeon | Nickelodeon Animation Studio | Season 2 aired on Nicktoons. | TV-Y7 | Traditional |
| Road Rovers | 1 | 13 | 1996 | Kids' WB | Warner Bros. Animation | | TV-Y | Traditional |
| RoboCop | 1 | 12 | 1988 | Syndication | Marvel Productions | Canadian co-production | —N/a | Traditional |
| RoboCop: Alpha Commando | 1 | 40 | 1998–1999 | Syndication | MGM Animation | Canadian co-production | TV-Y7 | Traditional |
| RoboGobo | 1 | 25 | 2025–present | Disney Jr. | Brown Bag Films | Irish co-production | TV-Y | CGI |
| Robot and Monster | 1 | 26 | 2012–2015 | Nickelodeon | Nickelodeon Animation Studio | The last 3 episodes aired on Nicktoons and the last episode was released on Noggin. | TV-Y7 | CGI |
| Robot Chicken | 11 | 220 | 2005–2022 | Adult Swim | Williams Street | | TV-MA | Stop-motion |
| Robotech | 3 | 85 | 1985 | Syndication | Harmony Gold USA | | TV-Y7 | Traditional |
| Robotix | 1 | 15 | 1986 | Syndication | Sunbow Entertainment | | TV-Y7 | Traditional |
| Robotomy | 1 | 10 | 2010–2011 | Cartoon Network | Cartoon Network Studios | | TV-PG | Traditional |
| Rock, Paper, Scissors | 1 | 20 | 2024–present | Nickelodeon | Nickelodeon Animation Studio | | TV-Y7 | Flash |
| Rocket & Groot | 1 | 12 | 2017 | Disney XD | Marvel Animation | | TV-Y7 | CGI |
| Rocket Power | 4 | 71 | 1999–2004 | Nickelodeon | Klasky Csupo; Nickelodeon Animation Studio | | TV-Y | Traditional |
| Rocko's Modern Life | 4 | 52 | 1993–1996 | Nickelodeon | Games Animation | | TV-Y | Traditional |
| Rod Rocket | 1 | 65 | 1963 | Syndication | Filmation | | —N/a | Traditional |
| Roger Ramjet | 5 | 156 | 1965–1969 | NBC | Pantomime Pictures | | —N/a | Traditional |
| Rosie's Rules | 1 | 40 | 2022–present | PBS Kids | Brown Bag Films | Canadian co-production | TV-Y | Flash |
| Roswell Conspiracies: Aliens, Myths and Legends | 1 | 40 | 1999–2000 | Syndication | BKN | Canadian co-production | TV-Y7 | Traditional |
| Roughnecks: Starship Troopers Chronicles | 1 | 40 | 1999–2000 | Syndication | Adelaide Productions | | TV-Y7 | CGI |
| Royal Crackers | 1 | 10 | 2023–present | Adult Swim | Titmouse, Inc. | | TV-MA | Flash |
| Rubik, the Amazing Cube | 1 | 12 | 1983 | ABC | Ruby-Spears Enterprises | | TV-Y | Traditional |
| Rude Dog and the Dweebs | 1 | 13 | 1989 | CBS | Marvel Productions | | TV-Y | Traditional |
| Rugrats (1991) | 9 | 172 | 1991–2004 | Nickelodeon | Klasky Csupo; Nickelodeon Animation Studio | | TV-Y | Traditional |
| Rugrats (2021) | 2 | 45 | 2021–2024 | Nickelodeon | Klasky Csupo; Nickelodeon Animation Studio | | TV-Y7 | CGI |
| RWBY | 9 | 116 | 2013–present | Rooster Teeth | Rooster Teeth Animation | | TV-MA | CGI |
| RWBY Chibi | 3 | 64 | 2016–2021 | YouTube | Rooster Teeth | | TV-MA | CGI |

=== S ===
| Title | Seasons | Episodes | Year | Original channel | American company | Note | Age rating | Technique |
|---|---|---|---|---|---|---|---|---|
| Saban's Adventures of Oliver Twist | 1 | 52 | 1996–1997 | Syndication | Saban Entertainment | | | Traditional |
| Saber Rider and the Star Sheriffs | 1 | 52 | 1987–1988 | Syndication | World Events Productions | Japanese co-production | | Traditional |
| Sabrina the Teenage Witch | 1 | 31 | 1970–1974 | CBS | Filmation | | | Traditional |
| Sabrina: Secrets of a Teenage Witch | 1 | 26 | 2013–2014 | Hub Network | MoonScoop Entertainment | Canadian-French-Indian-Irish co-production | TV-Y7 | CGI |
| Sabrina: The Animated Series | 1 | 65 | 1999 | ABC/UPN | DIC Entertainment | | TV-Y7 | Traditional |
| Sabrina's Secret Life | 1 | 26 | 2003–2004 | Syndication | DIC Entertainment | French co-production | TV-Y7 | Traditional |
| Sagwa, the Chinese Siamese Cat | 1 | 39 | 2001–2002 | PBS Kids | Sesame Workshop | Canadian co-production | TV-Y | Traditional |
| Salty's Lighthouse | 1 | 40 | 1997–1998 | TLC | Sunbow Entertainment | | TV-Y | Traditional |
| Sammy | 1 | 4 | 2000 | NBC | Adelaide Productions | | TV-PG | Traditional |
| Samson & Goliath | 1 | 20 | 1967–1968 | NBC | Hanna-Barbera | | | Traditional |
| Samurai Jack | 5 | 62 | 2001–2004, 2017 | Cartoon Network (2001–2004); Adult Swim (2017) | Cartoon Network Studios; Williams Street (S5) | | TV-Y7 (seasons 1-4); TV-14 (season 5) | Traditional |
| Samurai Rabbit: The Usagi Chronicles | 2 | 20 | 2022 | Netflix | Netflix Animation | French co-production | TV-Y7 | CGI |
| Sanjay and Craig | 3 | 60 | 2013–2016 | Nickelodeon | Nickelodeon Animation Studio | | TV-Y7 | Traditional |
| Santa Inc. | 1 | 8 | 2021 | HBO Max | Stoopid Buddy Stoodios | | TV-MA | Stop-Motion |
| Santiago of the Seas | 2 | 52 | 2020–2023 | Nickelodeon | Nickelodeon Animation Studio | | TV-Y | CGI |
| Santo Bugito | 1 | 13 | 1995–1996 | CBS | Klasky Csupo | | | Traditional |
| Saturday Morning All Star Hits! | 1 | 8 | 2021 | Netflix | Bento Box Entertainment | | TV-MA | Flash/Traditional |
| Saturday Supercade | 1 | 26 | 1983–1984 | CBS | Ruby-Spears Enterprises | | | Traditional |
| Sausage Party: Foodtopia | 1 | 16 | 2024–present | Amazon Prime Video | Sony Pictures Television | Canadian co-production | TV-MA | CGI |
| Saving Me | 1 | 20 | 2022–2023 | BYUtv | Sphere Animation | Canadian co-production | TV-Y7 | Flash |
| Scary Scooby Funnies | 1 | 20 | 1984–1985 | ABC | Hanna-Barbera | | | Traditional |
| Scavengers Reign | 1 | 9 | 2023–present | Max | Titmouse, Inc. | | TV-MA | Traditional |
| Schoolhouse Rock! | 7 | 65 | 1973–2009 | ABC | Scholastic Rock, Inc. | | TV-Y7 | Traditional |
| Science Court | 3 | 29 | 1997–2000 | ABC | Tom Snyder Productions | | TV-Y | Traditional |
| SciGirls | 7 | 46 | 2010–2023 | PBS Kids Go! (2010–2013); PBS Kids (2013–2023) | Twin Cities PBS | | TV-G | Flash/Live-action |
| Scooby-Doo and Guess Who? | 2 | 52 | 2019–2021 | Boomerang | Warner Bros. Animation | | TV-Y7 | Traditional |
| Scooby-Doo and Scrappy-Doo (1979) | 1 | 16 | 1979–1980 | ABC | Hanna-Barbera | | TV-G | Traditional |
| Scooby-Doo and Scrappy-Doo (1980) | 1 | 33 | 1980–1982 | ABC | Hanna-Barbera | | TV-G | Traditional |
| Scooby-Doo, Where Are You! | 3 | 41 | 1969–1978 | CBS; ABC | Hanna-Barbera | | TV-G | Traditional |
| Scooby-Doo! Mystery Incorporated | 2 | 52 | 2010–2013 | Cartoon Network | Warner Bros. Animation | | TV-Y7 | Traditional |
| Scooby's All-Star Laff-A-Lympics | 1 | 24 | 1977–1978 | ABC | Hanna-Barbera | | TV-G | Traditional |
| Scooby's Mystery Funhouse | 1 | 21 | 1985–1986 | ABC | Hanna-Barbera | | TV-G | Traditional |
| Scott Pilgrim Takes Off | 1 | 8 | 2023 | Netflix | Universal Content Productions | | TV-MA | Traditional |
| Sealab 2020 | 1 | 13 | 1972 | NBC | Hanna-Barbera | | TV-Y7 | Traditional |
| Sealab 2021 | 4 | 52 | 2001–2005 | Adult Swim | Williams Street; 70/30 Productions | | TV-14 | Traditional |
| Secret Adventures | 1 | 7 | 1993–1995 | Direct-to-video | Broadman & Holman Publishers | | | Traditional/Live-action |
| Secret Level | 1 | 8 | 2024–present | Amazon Prime Video | Blur Studio | | TV-14 | CGI |
| Secret Millionaires Club | 1 | 26 | 2011–2017 | The Hub Network | Bang Zoom! Entertainment | The last 4 episodes aired on qubo. | TV-Y7 | Flash |
| Secret Mountain Fort Awesome | 2 | 26 | 2011–2012 | Cartoon Network | Cartoon Network Studios | | TV-PG | Traditional |
| Secret Squirrel | 2 | 26 | 1965–1966 | NBC | Hanna-Barbera | | TV-G | Traditional |
| Sectaurs | 1 | 5 | 1985 | Syndication | Ruby-Spears Enterprises | | | Traditional |
| Seis Manos | 1 | 8 | 2019 | Netflix | Powerhouse Animation Studios | | TV-MA | Traditional |
| Sesame Street | 53 | 4,666 | 1969–present | PBS; PBS Kids; HBO | Sesame Workshop | | TV-Y | CGI/Flash/Stop-Motion/Traditional/Live-action |
| Seth MacFarlane's Cavalcade of Cartoon Comedy | 1 | 50 | 2008–2009 | YouTube | Fuzzy Door Productions | | | Traditional |
| Shaggy & Scooby-Doo Get a Clue! | 2 | 26 | 2006–2008 | Kids' WB | Warner Bros. Animation | | TV-Y7 | Traditional |
| Shake, Rattle and Roll | 1 | 13 | 1977 | NBC | Hanna-Barbera | | TV-G | Traditional |
| Shape Island | 1 | 8 | 2023–present | Apple TV+ | Bix Pix Entertainment | | TV-G | Stop-Motion |
| Sharkdog | 2 | 22 | 2021–present | Netflix | One Animation | Singaporian co-production | TV-Y7 | CGI |
| Shazzan | 1 | 18 | 1967–1968 | CBS | Hanna-Barbera | | | Traditional |
| Sheep in the Big City | 2 | 26 | 2000–2002 | Cartoon Network | Curious Pictures | | TV-Y7 | Traditional |
| Shelldon | 3 | 78 | 2008–2012 | Qubo | Classic Media | Season 1 only. Singaporean-Taiwanese-Thai co-production. | TV-Y7 | CGI |
| Shelley Duvall's Bedtime Stories | 2 | 13 | 1992–1993 | Showtime | Universal Animation Studios | | | Traditional |
| Sheriff Callie's Wild West | 2 | 45 | 2013–2017 | Disney Junior | Wild Canary Animation | | TV-Y | CGI |
| Sherlock Holmes in the 22nd Century | 1 | 26 | 1999–2001 | Fox Kids; Syndication | DIC Entertainment | British co-production | TV-Y7 | Traditional |
| Sherwood | 1 | 10 | 2019 | YouTube Premium | YouTube Originals | Irish-New Zealand co-production | TV-Y7 | CGI |
| She-Ra and the Princesses of Power | 5 | 52 | 2018–2020 | Netflix | DreamWorks Animation Television | | TV-Y7 | Traditional |
| She-Ra: Princess of Power | 2 | 93 | 1985–1987 | Syndication | Filmation | | TV-Y7 | Traditional |
| Shimmer and Shine | 4 | 86 | 2015–2020 | Nickelodeon | Nickelodeon Animation Studio | | TV-Y | CGI/Flash |
| Shirt Tales | 2 | 23 | 1982–1983 | NBC | Hanna-Barbera | | TV-G | Traditional |
| Shorties Watchin' Shorties | 1 | 13 | 2004 | Comedy Central | World Famous Pictures | | TV-MA | Flash |
| Shorty McShorts' Shorts | 2 | 13 | 2006 | Disney Channel | Walt Disney Television Animation | | TV-G | Flash |
| Sid the Science Kid | 3 | 67 | 2008–2013 | PBS Kids | The Jim Henson Company | | TV-Y | CGI |
| Siegfried & Roy: Masters of the Impossible | 1 | 4 | 1996 | Fox Kids | DIC Entertainment | | | Traditional |
| Silver Surfer | 1 | 13 | 1998 | Fox Kids | Marvel Studios | Canadian co-production | TV-Y7 | Traditional |
| SilverHawks | 1 | 65 | 1986 | Syndication | Rankin/Bass Animated Entertainment | | | Traditional |
| Sinbad Jr. and his Magic Belt | 1 | 102 | 1965 | Syndication | Hanna-Barbera | | | Traditional |
| Sing Me a Story with Belle | 2 | 26 | 1995–1997 | Syndication | Walt Disney Television | | | Traditional/Live-Action |
| Sit Down, Shut Up | 1 | 13 | 2009 | Fox | Adelaide Productions | | TV-14 | Traditional |
| Sitting Ducks | 2 | 26 | 2001–2003 | Cartoon Network | Creative Capers Entertainment | Canadian co-production | TV-Y | CGI |
| Skeleton Warriors | 1 | 13 | 1994 | CBS | Graz Entertainment | | TV-Y7 | Traditional |
| Skillsville | 1 | 26 | 2025–present | PBS Kids | Twin Cities PBS | Canadian co-production | TV-Y | Flash |
| Skull Island | 1 | 8 | 2023 | Netflix | Powerhouse Animation Studios | | TV-14 | Traditional |
| Sky Commanders | 1 | 13 | 1985–1987 | Syndication | Hanna-Barbera | | | Traditional |
| Sky Dancers | 1 | 27 | 1996 | France 2 | Gaumont | French co-production | | Traditional |
| Skyhawks | 1 | 17 | 1969–1971 | ABC | Pantomime Picture Production | | | Traditional |
| Skylanders Academy | 3 | 38 | 2016–2018 | Netflix | Activision Blizzard Studios | French co-production | TV-Y7 | CGI |
| Skysurfer Strike Force | 1 | 26 | 1995–1996 | Syndication | Ruby-Spears Enterprises | Japanese co-production | | Traditional |
| Slacker Cats | 2 | 12 | 2007–2009 | ABC Family | Film Roman | | TV-14 | Flash |
| Slangman's World | 1 | 13 | 2008–2009 | American Forces Network; GPB | Cosmic Toast Studios | | TV-Y | Live-Action/Flash |
| Slippin' Jimmy | 1 | 6 | 2022 | AMC+ | Starburns Industries | | TV-14 | Flash |
| Small Potatoes | 1 | 27 | 2011 | Disney Junior | Little Airplane Productions | British-Kenyan co-production | TV-Y | Flash |
| Smiling Friends | 3 | 25 | 2020–present | Adult Swim | Williams Street | Australian co-production | TV-MA | CGI/Flash/Stop-motion |
| Snoopy in Space | 2 | 24 | 2019–2021 | Apple TV+ | Peanuts Worldwide | Canadian co-production | TV-Y7 | Traditional |
| Sniz & Fondue | 1 | 23 | 1996–1998 | Nickelodeon | Nickelodeon Animation Studio | Shown on KaBlam!. | | Traditional |
| Snooper and Blabber | 3 | 45 | 1959–1961 | Syndication | Hanna-Barbera | | TV-G | Traditional |
| Snorks | 4 | 65 | 1984–1989 | NBC | Hanna-Barbera | | TV-G | Traditional |
| Sofia the First | 4 | 113 | 2012–2018 | Disney Junior | Disney Television Animation | | TV-Y | CGI |
| Sofia the First: Royal Magic | 1 | 26 | 2026–present | Disney Jr. | Disney Television Animation | | TV-Y | CGI |
| Son of Zorn | 1 | 13 | 2016–2017 | Fox | Agnew Jorné Productions | | TV-14 | Flash/Live-action |
| Sonic Boom | 2 | 52 | 2014–2017 | Cartoon Network; Boomerang | Sega | French co-production | TV-Y7 | CGI |
| Sonic Prime | 3 | 23 | 2022–2024 | Netflix | Netflix Animation | Canadian co-production | TV-Y7 | CGI |
| Sonic the Hedgehog | 1 | 26 | 1993–1994 | ABC | DIC Entertainment | Italitan co-production | TV-Y7 | Traditional |
| Sonic Underground | 1 | 40 | 1999 | Syndication | DIC Entertainment | French co-production | TV-Y7 | Traditional |
| Soul Quest Overdrive | 1 | 4 | 2011 | Adult Swim | Williams Street | | TV-MA | Flash |
| South Park | 26 | 327 | 1997–present | Comedy Central | South Park Studios | | TV-MA | CGI |
| Space Angel | 1 | 260 | 1962–1964 | Syndication | Cambria Productions | | | Traditional/Live-Action |
| Space Cats | 1 | 13 | 1991–1992 | NBC | Paul Fusco Productions | | TV-Y7 | Traditional |
| Space Ghost | 1 | 20 | 1966–1967 | CBS | Hanna-Barbera | | TV-Y7 | Traditional |
| Space Ghost Coast to Coast | 11 | 109 | 1994–2008 | Cartoon Network (1994–2001); Adult Swim (2001–2004) | Williams Street | | TV-PG | Traditional/Flash/Live-Action |
| Space Racers | 2 | 90 | 2014–2018 | PBS Kids (season 1); Sprout / Universal Kids (season 2) | Space Race, LLC; Maryland Public Television; WNET | | TV-Y | CGI |
| Space Sentinels | 1 | 13 | 1977 | NBC | Filmation | | | Traditional |
| Space Stars | 1 | 11 | 1981–1982 | NBC | Hanna-Barbera | | TV-Y7 | Traditional |
| Space Stars Finale | 1 | 11 | 1981 | NBC | Hanna-Barbera | | TV-Y7 | Traditional |
| Space Strikers | 1 | 13 | 1995 | UPN | Saban Entertainment | French co-production | | Traditional |
| Spaceballs: The Animated Series | 1 | 13 | 2008–2009 | G4 | G4 Media | | TV-14 | Flash |
| Special Agent Oso | 2 | 60 | 2009–2012 | Playhouse Disney | Disney Television Animation | | TV-Y | CGI |
| Special Agent Oso: Three Healthy Steps | 1 | 15 | 2011 | Disney Junior | Disney Television Animation | | TV-Y | CGI/Live-action |
| Speed Buggy | 1 | 16 | 1973 | CBS | Hanna-Barbera | | TV-G | Traditional |
| Speed Racer: The Next Generation | 2 | 52 | 2008–2013 | Nicktoons | Speed Racer Enterprises | Indian-Irish co-production | TV-Y7 | Flash |
| Spicy City | 1 | 6 | 1997 | HBO | HBO Animation | | TV-MA | Traditional |
| Spider-Man (1967) | 3 | 52 | 1967–1970 | ABC | Grantray-Lawrence Animation | Canadian co-production | TV-Y7 | Traditional |
| Spider-Man (1981) | 1 | 26 | 1981–1982 | Syndication | Marvel Productions | | TV-Y7 | Traditional |
| Spider-Man (1994) | 5 | 65 | 1994–1997 | Fox Kids | Marvel Entertainment | | TV-Y7 | Traditional |
| Spider-Man (2017) | 3 | 58 | 2017–2020 | Disney XD | Marvel Animation | | TV-Y7 | Traditional |
| Spider-Man and His Amazing Friends | 3 | 26 | 1981–1983 | NBC | Marvel Entertainment | | TV-Y7 | Traditional |
| Spider-Man Unlimited | 1 | 13 | 1999–2001 | Fox Kids | Marvel Studios | | TV-Y7 | Traditional |
| Spider-Man: The New Animated Series | 1 | 13 | 2003 | MTV | Sony Pictures Television | Canadian co-production | TV-PG | CGI |
| Spider-Woman | 1 | 16 | 1979–1980 | ABC | DePatie–Freleng Enterprises | | TV-Y7 | Traditional |
| Spidey and His Amazing Friends | 4 | 103 | 2021–present | Disney Junior | Marvel Animation | | TV-Y7 | CGI |
| Spiral Zone | 1 | 65 | 1981–1982 | Syndication | Atlantic/Kushner-Locke | | | Traditional |
| Spirit Rangers | 3 | 39 | 2022–2024 | Netflix | Netflix Animation | Italian co-production | TV-Y | CGI |
| Spirit Riding Free | 8 | 52 | 2017–2020 | Netflix | DreamWorks Animation Television | | TV-Y7 | CGI |
| Splash and Bubbles | 1 | 40 | 2016–2018 | PBS Kids | The Jim Henson Company | | TV-Y | CGI |
| Splinter Cell: Deathwatch | 1 | 8 | 2025–present | Netflix | Ubisoft Film & Television | Danish co-production | TV-MA | Traditional |
| SpongeBob SquarePants | 15 | 326 | 1999–present | Nickelodeon | United Plankton Pictures; Nickelodeon Animation Studio | | TV-Y7 | Traditional |
| Sport Billy | 1 | 26 | 1980–1981 | NBC | Filmation | | | Traditional |
| Spy Groove | 1 | 16 | 2000 | MTV | MTV Animation | | TV-14 | Traditional |
| Spy Kids: Mission Critical | 2 | 20 | 2018 | Netflix | Dimension Television | | TV-Y7 | CGI |
| Squidbillies | 13 | 132 | 2005–2021 | Adult Swim | Williams Street | | TV-MA | Flash |
| Squiddly Diddly | 1 | 26 | 1965–1966 | NBC | Hanna-Barbera | | TV-G | Traditional |
| Squirrel Boy | 2 | 26 | 2006–2007 | Cartoon Network | Cartoon Network Studios | | TV-Y7 | Traditional |
| Stanley | 3 | 65 | 2001–2004 | Playhouse Disney | Cartoon Pizza | | TV-Y | Traditional |
| Star Blazers | 3 | 77 | 1979–1984 | Syndication | Sunwagon Productions | Japanese co-production | | Traditional |
| Star Trek: Lower Decks | 4 | 40 | 2020–present | Paramount+ | CBS Eye Animation Productions | | TV-14 | Traditional |
| Star Trek: Prodigy | 3 | 20 | 2021–present | Paramount+; Netflix | Nickelodeon Animation Studio | | TV-Y7 | CGI |
| Star Trek: The Animated Series | 1 | 22 | 1973–1974 | NBC | Filmation | | | Traditional |
| Star vs. the Forces of Evil | 4 | 77 | 2015–2019 | Disney XD (seasons 1-3); Disney Channel (season 4) | Disney Television Animation | | TV-Y7 | Traditional |
| Star Wars Tales | 3 | 18 | 2022–2025 | Disney+ | Lucasfilm | | TV-PG | CGI |
| Star Wars: The Bad Batch | 3 | 44 | 2021–present | Disney+ | Lucasfilm Animation | | TV-PG | CGI |
| Star Wars: Clone Wars | 2 | 25 | 2003–2005 | Cartoon Network | Lucasfilm; Cartoon Network Studios | | TV-Y7 | Traditional |
| Star Wars: Droids | 1 | 13 | 1985–1986 | ABC | Lucasfilm | Canadian co-production | TV-Y7 | Traditional |
| Star Wars Forces of Destiny | 2 | 32 | 2017–2018 | YouTube | Lucasfilm | | | Flash |
| Star Wars: The Clone Wars | 7 | 133 | 2008–2020 | Cartoon Network; Netflix; Disney+ | Lucasfilm | | TV-PG | CGI |
| Star Wars: Visions | 2 | 18 | 2021–present | Disney+ | Lucasfilm | | TV-Y7 | CGI/Stop-Motion/Flash/Traditional |
| Star Wars: Visions Presents | 1 | 8 | 2026 | Disney+; Hulu | Lucasfilm | Japanese co-production | TV-14 | Anime |
| Star Wars: Young Jedi Adventures | 3 | 55 | 2023–present | Disney Jr. | Lucasfilm | | TV-Y7 | CGI |
| Starcom: The U.S. Space Force | 1 | 13 | 1987 | Syndication | DIC Entertainment | | | Traditional |
| Stargate Infinity | 1 | 26 | 2002–2003 | FoxBox | DIC Entertainment | French co-production | TV-Y7 | Traditional |
| Starship Regulars | 1 | 10 | 1999 | | icebox.com | | | Flash |
| Static Shock | 4 | 52 | 2000–2004 | Kids' WB | Warner Bros. Animation | | TV-Y7 | Traditional |
| Station Zero | 1 | 20 | 1999 | MTV | MTV Animation | | TV-14 | Traditional |
| Strange Planet | 1 | 10 | 2023–present | Apple TV+ | ShadowMachine | Canadian co-production | TV-14 | Flash |
| Starveillance | 1 | 6 | 2007 | E! | Fogelmania Productions | Canadian co-production | TV-14 | Stop-Motion |
| Steven Universe | 5 | 160 | 2013–2019 | Cartoon Network | Cartoon Network Studios | | TV-PG | Traditional |
| Steven Universe Future | 1 | 20 | 2019–2020 | Cartoon Network | Cartoon Network Studios | | TV-PG | Traditional |
| Stone Protectors | 1 | 13 | 1993 | Syndication | Graz Entertainment | | | Traditional |
| Stone Quackers | 1 | 12 | 2014–2015 | FXX | ADHD Studios | | TV-MA | Flash |
| StoryBots Super Songs | 1 | 10 | 2016–2017 | Netflix | JibJab Bros. Studios | | TV-Y | Flash |
| Stranger Things: Tales from '85 | 1 | 10 | 2026–present | Netflix | 21 Laps Entertainment | | TV-PG | CGI |
| Strawberry Shortcake | 4 | 22 | 2003–2008 | Syndication | DIC Entertainment | | TV-Y | Traditional |
| Strawberry Shortcake: Berry in the Big City | 3 | 60 | 2021–present | YouTube | WildBrain Studios | | TV-Y | Flash |
| Strawberry Shortcake's Berry Bitty Adventures | 4 | 65 | 2010–2015 | The Hub / Discovery Family | Splash Entertainment; American Greetings | | TV-Y | CGI |
| Street Fighter | 2 | 26 | 1995–1997 | USA Network | Universal Television | Canadian co-production | TV-Y7 | Traditional |
| Street Sharks | 3 | 40 | 1994–1997 | Syndication | DIC Entertainment | | TV-Y7 | Traditional |
| Stretch Armstrong and the Flex Fighters | 2 | 23 | 2017–2018 | Netflix | Hasbro Studios | | TV-Y7 | Traditional |
| Stressed Eric | 1 | 13 | 1998–2000 | NBC | Klasky Csupo | British co-production | TV-14 | Traditional |
| Stripperella | 1 | 13 | 2003–2004 | Spike | Spike Animation | | TV-MA | Traditional |
| Strip Law | 1 | 10 | 2026 | Netflix | Titmouse, Inc. | | TV-MA | Traditional |
| Stroker & Hoop | 1 | 13 | 2004–2005 | Adult Swim | Studio B Productions | | TV-14 | Flash |
| Stuart Little: The Animated Series | 1 | 13 | 2003 | HBO Family | Adelaide Productions | | TV-Y7 | Traditional |
| Student Bodies | 3 | 65 | 1997–2000 | Syndication | Sunbow Entertainment | Canadian co-production | TV-Y7 | Traditional/Live-action |
| StuGo | 1 | 20 | 2025 | Disney Channel | Disney Television Animation | | TV-Y7 | Flash |
| Stunt Dawgs | 1 | 40 | 1992–1993 | Syndication | DIC Entertainment | Canadian co-production | | Traditional |
| Subway Surfers: The Animated Series | 1 | 11 | 2018 | YouTube | SYBO | | | Flash |
| Sugar and Toys | 2 | 16 | 2019–2020 | Fuse | | | TV-MA | Flash/Live-Action |
| Sunny Day | 2 | 60 | 2017–2020 | Nickelodeon | Nickelodeon Animation Studio | Season 2 aired on Nick Jr. Channel and Season 3 aired on Amazon Prime Video. British-Canadian co-production | TV-Y | Flash |
| Super Chicken | 1 | 17 | 1967 | ABC | Jay Ward Productions | | | Traditional |
| Super Crooks | 1 | 13 | 2021 | Netflix | Millarworld | Japanese co-production | TV-MA | Traditional |
| Super Dave: Daredevil for Hire | 1 | 13 | 1992–1993 | Fox Kids | DIC Entertainment | Italian co-production | | Traditional |
| Super Dinosaur | 1 | 26 | 2018–2019 | Amazon Prime Video | Skybound Entertainment | Canadian co-production | TV-Y7 | CGI |
| Super Duper Bunny League | 1 | 26 | 2025–present | Nickelodeon | Nickelodeon Animation Studio | | TV-Y | Flash |
| Super Duper Sumos | 1 | 26 | 2002–2003 | Nickelodeon | DIC Entertainment | South Korean co-production | TV-Y7 | Traditional |
| Super Friends (1973) | 1 | 16 | 1973 | ABC | Hanna-Barbera | | TV-Y7 | Traditional |
| Super Friends (1980) | 3 | 22 | 1980–1983 | ABC | Hanna-Barbera | | TV-Y7 | Traditional |
| Super Friends: The Legendary Super Powers Show | 1 | 8 | 1984–1985 | ABC | Hanna-Barbera | | TV-Y7 | Traditional |
| Super Giant Robot Brothers | 1 | 10 | 2022 | Netflix | Netflix Animation | | TV-Y7 | CGI |
| Super Mario World | 1 | 13 | 1991 | NBC | DIC Entertainment | Canadian-Italian co-production | TV-Y7 | Traditional |
| Super Monsters | 3 | 21 | 2017–2021 | Netflix | 41 Entertainment | Canadian co-production | TV-Y | CGI |
| Super President | 1 | 30 | 1967–1968 | NBC | DePatie–Freleng Enterprises | | | Traditional |
| Super Robot Monkey Team Hyperforce Go! | 4 | 52 | 2004–2006 | Jetix; Toon Disney; ABC Family | Walt Disney Television Animation (credited as Jetix Animation Concepts) | Japanese co-production | TV-Y7 | Traditional |
| Super Science Friends | 1 | 7 | 2015–2020 | YouTube | Titmouse, Inc. | | | Flash |
| Super Why! | 3 | 103 | 2007–2016 | PBS Kids | Out of the Blue Enterprises | Canadian co-production | TV-Y | CGI |
| Super Wings | 8 | 264 | 2014–present | Universal Kids | Little Airplane Productions | Chinese-South Korean co-production | TV-Y | CGI |
| Superbook | 5 | 82 | 2011–2021 | CBN | | | | CGI |
| Superjail! | 4 | 36 | 2008–2014 | Adult Swim | Williams Street | | TV-MA | Flash |
| SuperKitties | 3 | 62 | 2023–present | Disney Jr. | Sony Pictures Television Kids | | TV-Y | CGI |
| Superman | 1 | 26 | 1988 | CBS | Ruby-Spears Enterprises | | TV-Y7 | Traditional |
| Superman: The Animated Series | 4 | 54 | 1995–2000 | Kids' WB | Warner Bros. Animation | | TV-Y7 | Traditional |
| Supernatural Academy | 1 | 16 | 2022 | Peacock | 41 Entertainment | Canadian co-production | TV-14 | CGI |
| SuperNews! | 2 | 67 | 2005–2010 | Current TV | | | TV-MA | Flash |
| Swamp Thing | 1 | 5 | 1990–1991 | Fox Kids | DIC Entertainment | | | Traditional |
| SWAT Kats: The Radical Squadron | 2 | 25 | 1993–1995 | TBS | Hanna-Barbera | | TV-Y7 | Traditional |
| Sylvanian Families | 1 | 13 | 1987 | Syndication | DIC Entertainment | | | Traditional |
| Sym-Bionic Titan | 1 | 20 | 2010–2011 | Cartoon Network | Cartoon Network Studios | | TV-PG | Traditional |

=== T ===
| Title | Seasons | Episodes | Year | Original channel | American company | Note | Age rating | Technique |
|---|---|---|---|---|---|---|---|---|
| T.O.T.S. | 3 | 75 | 2019–2022 | Disney Junior | Titmouse, Inc. | | TV-Y | CGI |
| T.U.F.F. Puppy | 3 | 60 | 2010–2015 | Nickelodeon | Billionfold Inc.; Nickelodeon Animation Studio | Season 2, Episodes 10-26 and Season 3 aired on Nicktoons. | TV-Y7 | Traditional |
| Tak and the Power of Juju | 1 | 26 | 2007–2009 | Nickelodeon | Nickelodeon Animation Studio | | TV-Y7 | CGI |
| Take Two with Phineas and Ferb | 1 | 20 | 2010–2011 | Disney Channel | Walt Disney Television Animation | | TV-G | Traditional/Live-action |
| Tales from the Cryptkeeper | 3 | 39 | 1993–1999 | ABC | Nelvana | Canadian co-production | TV-Y7 | Traditional |
| Tales of the Jedi | 1 | 6 | 2022 | Disney+ | Lucasfilm Animation | | TV-PG | CGI |
| Tales of the Teenage Mutant Ninja Turtles | 2 | 24 | 2024–2025 | Paramount+ | Nickelodeon Animation Studio | | TV-Y7 | Traditional |
| Tales of the Wizard of Oz | 1 | 110 | 1961 | Syndication | Videocraft Productions | | | Traditional |
| TaleSpin | 1 | 65 | 1990–1991 | The Disney Channel | Walt Disney Television Animation | | TV-Y | Traditional |
| Talking Friends | 1 | 10 | 2012 | Disney.com | Disney Interactive | | | CGI |
| Tangled: Short Cuts | 1 | 10 | 2017–2018 | Disney Channel | Disney Television Animation | | TV-Y7 | Traditional |
| Tarantula | 1 | 10 | 2017 | TBS | Studio T | | TV-14 | Traditional |
| Tarzan and Jane | 2 | 13 | 2017–2018 | Netflix | 41 Entertainment | Canadian co-production | TV-Y7 | CGI |
| Tarzan and the Super 7 | 1 | 36 | 1978–1980 | CBS | Filmation | | | Traditional |
| Tarzan, Lord of the Jungle | 1 | 33 | 1978–1980 | CBS | Filmation | | | Traditional |
| Tasty Time with ZeFronk | 1 | 20 | 2008–2010 | Playhouse Disney | OddBot Inc. | | TV-Y | Flash |
| Taz-Mania | 4 | 65 | 1991–1995 | Fox Kids | Warner Bros. Animation | | TV-Y | Traditional |
| Team Umizoomi | 4 | 77 | 2010–2015 | Nick Jr. Channel | Curious Pictures; Nickelodeon Animation Studio | | TV-Y | CGI/Flash/Live-Action |
| Teamo Supremo | 3 | 39 | 2002–2004 | Toon Disney | Walt Disney Television Animation | | TV-Y7 | Traditional |
| Team Zenko Go | 2 | 22 | 2022 | Netflix | DreamWorks Animation Television | Canadian co-production | TV-Y | CGI |
| Teacher's Pet | 2 | 39 | 2000–2002 | ABC; Toon Disney | Walt Disney Television Animation | | TV-Y7 | Traditional |
| Telecomics | 1 | 165 | 1949–1952 | NBC | | | | Traditional |
| Teen Force | 1 | 11 | 1981 | NBC | Hanna-Barbera | | TV-Y7 | Traditional |
| Teen Titans | 5 | 65 | 2003–2006 | Cartoon Network | Warner Bros. Animation | | TV-Y7 | Traditional |
| Teen Titans Go! | 8 | 397 | 2013–present | Cartoon Network | Warner Bros. Animation; DC Entertainment | | TV-PG | Flash |
| Teen Wolf | 1 | 21 | 1986–1987 | CBS | Southern Star/Hanna-Barbera Australia | Australian co-production | | Traditional |
| Teenage Euthanasia | 2 | 17 | 2021–2023 | Adult Swim | PFFR | | TV-MA | Flash |
| Teenage Mutant Ninja Turtles (1987) | 10 | 193 | 1987–1996 | Syndication; CBS | Fred Wolf Films | | TV-Y7 | Traditional |
| Teenage Mutant Ninja Turtles (2003) | 7 | 155 | 2003–2009 | 4Kids TV | 4Kids Entertainment | Season 7 aired on The CW4Kids. | TV-Y7 | Traditional |
| Teenage Mutant Ninja Turtles (2012) | 5 | 124 | 2012–2017 | Nickelodeon | Nickelodeon Animation Studio | | TV-Y7 | CGI |
| Teeny Mutant Ninja Turtles | 1 | 30 | 2026–present | YouTube | Nickelodeon Digital Studio | | TV-Y | CGI |
| Ten Year Old Tom | 2 | 20 | 2021–2023 | HBO Max / Max | ShadowMachine | | TV-MA | Flash |
| Tender Touches | 3 | 15 | 2017–2020 | Adult Swim | Williams Street | | TV-14 | Traditional |
| Tenko and the Guardians of the Magic | 1 | 13 | 1995–1996 | Syndication | Saban Entertainment | | | Traditional |
| Tennessee Tuxedo and His Tales | 3 | 70 | 1963–1966 | CBS | Total Television; Leonardo Television | | | Traditional |
| Terminator Zero | 1 | 8 | 2024–present | Netflix | Netflix Animation | Japanese co-production | | Traditional |
| Terminator Salvation: The Machinima Series | 1 | 6 | 2009 | Machinima | Machinima, Inc. | | | CGI |
| The 7D | 2 | 44 | 2014–2016 | Disney XD | Disney Television Animation | | TV-Y7 | Traditional |
| The 13 Ghosts of Scooby-Doo | 1 | 13 | 1985 | ABC | Hanna-Barbera | | TV-G | Traditional |
| The ABC Saturday Superstar Movie | 1 | 20 | 1972–1973 | ABC | | | | Traditional |
| The Abbott and Costello Cartoon Show | 1 | 39 | 1967–1968 | Syndication | Hanna-Barbera | | | Traditional |
| The Addams Family (1973) | 1 | 16 | 1973 | NBC | Hanna-Barbera | | TV-G | Traditional |
| The Addams Family (1992) | 1 | 21 | 1992–1993 | ABC | Hanna-Barbera | | TV-G | Traditional |
| The Adventures of Batman | 1 | 17 | 1968–1969 | CBS | Filmation | | TV-Y7 | Traditional |
| The Adventures of Chico and Guapo | 1 | 5 | 2006 | MTV2 | MTV Animation | | TV-14 | Flash |
| The Adventures of Chuck and Friends | 2 | 39 | 2010–2012 | The Hub | Hasbro Studios | Canadian co-production | TV-Y | CGI |
| The Adventures of Digger and Friends | 1 | 5 | 2009 | Fox | Fox Sports | | —N/a | CGI |
| The Adventures of Don Coyote and Sancho Panda | 1 | 26 | 1990–1991 | Syndication | Hanna-Barbera | Italian co-production | | Traditional |
| The Adventures of Edward the Less | 1 | 13 | 2001 | Sci-Fi Channel | | | | Flash |
| The Adventures of Gulliver | 1 | 17 | 1968–1969 | ABC | Hanna-Barbera | | TV-Y7 | Traditional |
| The Adventures of Hyperman | 1 | 13 | 1995–1996 | CBS | Hyperion Animation | | | Traditional |
| The Adventures of Jimmy Neutron: Boy Genius | 3 | 61 | 2002–2006 | Nickelodeon | O Entertainment; DNA Productions; Nickelodeon Animation Studio | | TV-Y7 | CGI |
| The Adventures of Kid Danger | 1 | 13 | 2018 | Nickelodeon | Schneider's Bakery; Nickelodeon Animation Studio | | TV-Y7 | Flash |
| The Adventures of Lariat Sam | 1 | 59 | 1962 | CBS | | | | Traditional |
| The Adventures of OG Sherlock Kush | 1 | 20 | 2015–2016 | FXX | ADHD Studios | | | Traditional |
| The Adventures of Paddy the Pelican | 1 | 6 | 1950 | ABC | Tempe-Toons | | | Traditional |
| The Adventures of Puss in Boots | 6 | 78 | 2015–2018 | Netflix | DreamWorks Animation Television | | TV-Y7 | CGI |
| The Adventures of Raggedy Ann and Andy | 1 | 13 | 1988 | CBS | CBS Entertainment Productions | | | Traditional |
| The Adventures of Rocky and Bullwinkle | 2 | 26 | 2018–2019 | Amazon Prime Video | DreamWorks Animation Television | | TV-Y7 | Flash |
| The Adventures of Rocky and Bullwinkle and Friends | 5 | 163 | 1959–1964 | ABC; NBC | Jay Ward Productions | | TV-G | Traditional |
| The Adventures of Sam & Max: Freelance Police | 1 | 13 | 1997–1998 | Fox Kids | Nelvana | Canadian co-production | TV-Y7 | Traditional |
| The Adventures of Spunky and Tadpole | 1 | 150 | 1958–1961 | Syndication | Beverly Hills Productions | | | Traditional |
| The Adventures of Super Mario Bros. 3 | 1 | 13 | 1990 | NBC | DIC Entertainment | Canadian-Italian co-production | TV-Y7 | Traditional |
| The Adventures of Superboy | 3 | 34 | 1966–1968 | CBS | Filmation | | TV-Y7 | Traditional |
| The Adventures of T-Rex | 1 | 52 | 1992 | Syndication | Gunther-Wahl Productions | French-Japanese co-production | | Traditional |
| The All New Popeye Hour | 4 | 56 | 1978–1983 | CBS | Hanna-Barbera | | | Traditional |
| The All-New Dennis the Menace | 1 | 13 | 1993 | CBS | DIC Animation City | | | Traditional |
| The All-New Super Friends Hour | 1 | 15 | 1977–1978 | ANC | Hanna-Barbera | | TV-Y7 | Traditional |
| The Alvin Show | 1 | 26 | 1961–1962 | CBS | Bagdasarian Productions | | TV-G | Traditional |
| The Amazing Chan and the Chan Clan | 1 | 16 | 1972 | CBS | Hanna-Barbera | | TV-G | Traditional |
| The Amazing Colossal Adventures of WordGirl | 1 | 26 | 2006–2007 | PBS Kids Go! | Soup2Nuts | Shown on Maya & Miguel. | TV-Y | Flash |
| The Amazing World of Gumball | 6 | 240 | 2011–2019 | Cartoon Network | Cartoon Network Development Studio Europe | British co-production | TV-Y7 | CGI/Flash/Stop-motion/Traditional |
| The Ambiguously Gay Duo | 1 | 12 | 1996–2011 | NBC | J.J. Sedelmaier Productions, Inc. | Shown on TV Funhouse. | | Traditional |
| The Angry Beavers | 4 | 62 | 1997–2001 | Nickelodeon | Nickelodeon Animation Studio | | TV-Y | Traditional |
| The Aquabats! Super Show! | 2 | 21 | 2012–2014 | The Hub Network | The Magic Store Productions | | TV-PG | Flash/Live-action |
| The Archie Show | 1 | 17 | 1968–1969 | CBS | Filmation | | TV-G | Traditional |
| The Astronut Show | 1 | 19 | 1965–1967 | Syndication | Terrytoons | | | Traditional |
| The Atom Ant/Secret Squirrel Show | 2 | 26 | 1965–1967 | NBC | Hanna-Barbera | | TV-G | Traditional |
| The Avengers: Earth's Mightiest Heroes | 2 | 52 | 2010–2011 | Disney XD | Marvel Animation | | TV-Y7 | Traditional |
| The Avengers: United They Stand | 1 | 13 | 1999–2000 | Fox Kids Network | Saban Entertainment | Canadian co-production | TV-Y7 | Traditional |
| The Awesomes | 3 | 30 | 2013–2015 | Hulu | Bento Box Entertainment | | TV-14 | Traditional |
| The Bad Guys: Breaking In | 1 | 9 | 2025 | Netflix | DreamWorks Animation Television | | TV-Y7 | CGI |
| The Baby Huey Show | 1 | 26 | 1994–1995 | Syndication | Harvey Entertainment | | | Traditional |
| The Backyardigans | 4 | 80 | 2004–2013 | Nickelodeon | Nickelodeon Animation Studio | Season 4 aired on Nick Jr. Canadian co-production | TV-Y | CGI |
| The Banana Splits | 2 | 36 | 1968–1970 | NBC | Hanna-Barbera | | TV-G | Traditional/Live-Action |
| The Barkleys | 1 | 13 | 1972 | NBC | DePatie–Freleng Enterprises | | | Traditional |
| The Batman | 5 | 65 | 2004–2008 | Kids' WB | Warner Bros. Animation | | TV-Y7 | Traditional |
| The Batman/Superman Hour | 1 | 34 | 1968–1969 | CBS | Filmation | | TV-Y7 | Traditional |
| The Batman/Tarzan Adventure Hour | 1 | 52 | 1977–1978 | CBS | Filmation | | TV-Y7 | Traditional |
| The Beagles | 1 | 36 | 1966–1967 | CBS | Total Television | | | Traditional |
| The Berenstain Bears | 2 | 52 | 1985–1987 | CBS | DIC Entertainment | Australian co-production | TV-Y | Traditional |
| The Big World of Little Adam | 1 | 110 | 1964 | Syndication | | | | Traditional |
| The Biskitts | 1 | 26 | 1983–1984 | CBS | Hanna-Barbera | | | Traditional |
| The Bob Clampett Show | 1 | 26 | 2000–2001 | Cartoon Network | Warner Bros. Cartoons | | | Traditional |
| The Boondocks | 4 | 55 | 2005–2014 | Adult Swim | Adelaide Productions | | TV-MA | Traditional |
| The Boss Baby: Back in Business | 4 | 49 | 2018–2020 | Netflix | DreamWorks Animation Television | | TV-Y7 | CGI |
| The Boss Baby: Back in the Crib | 2 | 28 | 2022–2023 | Netflix | DreamWorks Animation Television | | TV-Y7 | CGI |
| The Boys Presents: Diabolical | 1 | 8 | 2022 | Amazon Prime Video | Amazon Studios | | TV-MA | Traditional |
| The Brady Kids | 1 | 22 | 1972–1973 | ABC | Filmation | | | Traditional |
| The Brak Show | 3 | 28 | 2000–2003 | Adult Swim | Williams Street | | TV-PG | Flash |
| The Brothers Flub | 1 | 26 | 1999 | Nickelodeon | Sunbow Entertainment | German co-production | TV-Y7 | Traditional |
| The Brothers Grunt | 1 | 42 | 1994–1995 | MTV | a.k.a. Cartoon | Canadian co-production | TV-14 | Traditional |
| The Bugs Bunny Show | 27 | 684 | 1960–2000 | ABC; CBS | Warner Bros. Cartoons | | TV-G | Traditional |
| The Buzz on Maggie | 1 | 20 | 2005–2006 | Disney Channel | Walt Disney Television Animation | | TV-G | Flash |
| The California Raisin Show | 1 | 13 | 1989 | CBS | Will Vinton Productions | | | Stop-Motion |
| The Care Bears Family | 3 | 49 | 1986–1988 | ABC; Syndication | DIC Entertainment | Canadian co-production | TV-Y | Traditional |
| The Casagrandes | 3 | 70 | 2019–2022 | Nickelodeon | Nickelodeon Animation Studio | | TV-Y7 | Flash |
| The Cat in the Hat Knows a Lot About That! | 3 | 80 | 2010–2018 | PBS Kids | Random House | British-Canadian co-production | TV-Y | Flash |
| The Cat&Birdy Warneroonie PinkyBrainy Big Cartoonie Show | 1 | 13 | 1999–2000 | Kids' WB | Warner Bros. Animation | | TV-Y7 | Traditional |
| The Catillac Cats | 1 | 13 | 1984–1985 | Syndication | DIC Entertainment | | | Traditional |
| The Charlie Brown and Snoopy Show | 2 | 18 | 1983–1985 | CBS | Bill Melendez Productions | | TV-Y | Traditional |
| The Chica Show | 3 | 51 | 2012–2015 | Sprout | Sprout Originals | | TV-Y | Flash/Live-Action |
| The Chicken Squad | 1 | 29 | 2021–2022 | Disney Junior | Wild Canary Animation | | TV-Y | CGI |
| The Chosen Adventures | 1 | 14 | 2025 | Amazon Prime Video | Amazon MGM Studios | | TV-PG | CGI |
| The Cleveland Show | 4 | 89 | 2009–2013 | Fox | Fuzzy Door Productions | | TV-14 | Traditional |
| The Comic Strip | 1 | 65 | 1987 | Syndication | Rankin/Bass Animated Entertainment | | | Traditional |
| The Completely Mental Misadventures of Ed Grimley | 1 | 13 | 1988 | NBC | Hanna-Barbera | | | Traditional |
| The Cramp Twins | 1 | 26 | 2004 | Cartoon Network | Sunbow Entertainment | British-German co-production. Season 1 only. | TV-Y7 | Traditional |
| The Crayon Box | 1 | 26 | 1997–1998 | Syndication | Sunbow Entertainment | | TV-Y | Traditional/Live-Action |
| The Creature Cases | 3 | 20 | 2022–present | Netflix | Silvergate Media | British co-production | TV-Y | CGI |
| The Critic | 2 | 23 | 1994–1995 | ABC | Gracie Films | | TV-14 | Traditional |
| The Croods: Family Tree | 8 | 52 | 2021–2023 | Hulu; Peacock | DreamWorks Animation Television | | TV-Y7 | CGI |
| The Cuphead Show! | 3 | 36 | 2022 | Netflix | Netflix Animation | Canadian co-production | TV-Y7 | Traditional |
| The Cyanide & Happiness Show | 4 | 41 | 2014–2019 | YouTube; Seeso; VRV | LowBrow Studios | | | Flash |
| The Deputy Dawg Show | 1 | 104 | 1960–1964 | Syndication | Terrytoons | | | Traditional |
| The Dick & Paula Celebrity Special | 1 | 6 | 1999–2000 | FX | Soup2Nuts | | TV-MA | Flash |
| The Dick Tracy Show | 1 | 130 | 1961–1962 | Syndication | United Productions of America | | | Traditional |
| The Doc Files | 1 | 10 | 2013 | Disney Junior | Brown Bag Films | | TV-Y | Traditional |
| The Doomies | 1 | 10 | 2026–present | Disney XD | Disney Television Animation | French co-production | TV-Y7 | Traditional |
| The Doozers | 2 | 72 | 2013–2018 | Hulu | The Jim Henson Company | Canadian co-production | TV-Y | CGI |
| The Dragon Prince | 3 | 36 | 2018–present | Netflix | MWM Studios | Canadian co-production | TV-Y7 | CGI |
| The Drinky Crow Show | 1 | 10 | 2008–2009 | Adult Swim | Mirari Films; Williams Street | | TV-MA | CGI |
| The Duck Factory | 1 | 13 | 1984 | NBC | MTM Enterprises | | TV-14 | Traditional/Live-action |
| The Dukes | 1 | 20 | 1983 | CBS | Hanna-Barbera | | | Traditional |
| The Emperor's New School | 2 | 52 | 2006–2008 | Disney Channel | Walt Disney Television Animation | | TV-G | Traditional |
| The Epic Tales of Captain Underpants | 4 | 45 | 2018–2020 | Netflix | DreamWorks Animation Television; Scholastic Corporation | | TV-Y7 | Flash |
| The Fairly OddParents | 10 | 172 | 2001–2017 | Nickelodeon | Frederator Studios; Nickelodeon Animation Studio | The last 11 episodes aired on Nicktoons in 2017. | TV-Y7 | Traditional (seasons 1-9)/Flash (season 10) |
| The Fairly OddParents: A New Wish | 1 | 20 | 2024 | Nickelodeon | Frederator Studios; Nickelodeon Animation Studio | | TV-Y7 | CGI |
| The Fairly OddParents: Fairly Odder | 1 | 13 | 2022 | Paramount+ | Billionfold Inc. | | TV-G | Traditional/Live-action |
| The Famous Adventures of Mr. Magoo | 1 | 26 | 1964–1965 | NBC | United Productions of America | | | Traditional |
| The Fantastic Voyages of Sinbad the Sailor | 1 | 26 | 1998 | Cartoon Network | Fred Wolf Films | | TV-Y7 | Traditional |
| The Flintstone Comedy Hour | 1 | 16 | 1972–1974 | CBS | Hanna-Barbera | | TV-G | Traditional |
| The Flintstone Comedy Show | 1 | 18 | 1980–1981 | NBC | Hanna-Barbera | | TV-G | Traditional |
| The Flintstone Funnies | 1 | 45 | 1982–1984 | NBC | Hanna-Barbera | | TV-G | Traditional |
| The Flintstone Kids | 3 | 36 | 1986–1987 | ABC | Hanna-Barbera | | TV-G | Traditional |
| The Flintstones | 6 | 166 | 1960–1966 | ABC | Hanna-Barbera | | TV-G | Traditional |
| The Fonz and the Happy Days Gang | 1 | 24 | 1980–1981 | ABC | Hanna-Barbera | | | Traditional |
| The Fox Cubhouse | 1 | 234 | 1994–1996 | Fox Kids | WQED | | TV-Y | Traditional/Live-action |
| The Freak Brothers | 1 | 12 | 2021–present | Tubi | Lionsgate Television | | TV-MA | Flash |
| The Freedom Force | 1 | 5 | 1978 | ABC | Filmation | | | Traditional |
| The Fungies! | 3 | 80 | 2020–2021 | Max; Cartoon Network | Cartoon Network Studios | | TV-Y7 | Traditional |
| The Funky Phantom | 1 | 17 | 1971–1972 | ABC | Hanna-Barbera | Australian co-production | TV-G | Traditional |
| The Funny Company | 1 | 155 | 1963 | Syndication | Ken Snyder Productions | | TV-Y | Traditional |
| The Further Adventures of SuperTed | 1 | 13 | 1989 | Syndication | Hanna-Barbera | British co-production | | Traditional |
| The Future is Wild | 1 | 26 | 2007–2008 | Discovery Kids | | Canadian-Singaporean co-production | TV-Y7 | CGI |
| The Garden | 2 | 30 | 2023–present | Pure Flix; Angel Studios; Apple TV | | | TV-Y | Flash |
| The Gary Coleman Show | 1 | 26 | 1982 | NBC | Hanna-Barbera | | | Traditional |
| The Get Along Gang | 1 | 13 | 1984 | CBS | DIC Entertainment | French co-production | | Traditional |
| The Ghost and Molly McGee | 2 | 41 | 2021–2024 | Disney Channel | Disney Television Animation | | TV-Y7 | Flash |
| The Glo Friends | 1 | 26 | 1986–1987 | Syndication | Sunbow Productions | | | Traditional |
| The God & Devil Show | 1 | 44 | 1999–2001 | | Mondo Media | | | Flash |
| The Goddamn George Liquor Program | 1 | 8 | 1997 | | Spümcø | | | Flash |
| The Goode Family | 1 | 13 | 2009 | ABC | Judgmental Films | | TV-PG | Traditional |
| The Garfield Show | 5 | 107 | 2008–2016 | Cartoon Network; Boomerang | Paws, Inc. | French co-production | TV-Y7 | CGI |
| The Great Grape Ape Show | 1 | 16 | 1975 | ABC | Hanna-Barbera | | TV-G | Traditional |
| The Great North | 5 | 97 | 2021–2025 | Fox | Wilo Productions | | TV-14 | Traditional |
| The Great Space Coaster | 5 | 250 | 1981–1986 | Syndication | Sunbow Productions | | | Live-Action/Traditional |
| The Grim Adventures of Billy & Mandy | 6 | 84 | 2003–2007 | Cartoon Network | Cartoon Network Studios | | TV-Y7 | Traditional |
| The Guardians of Justice | 1 | 9 | 2022 | Netflix | Bootleg Universe | | TV-MA | Live-Action/Traditional |
| The Gumby Show | 1 | 43 | 1956 | NBC | Clokey Productions; Premavision | | | Stop-Motion |
| The Hanna-Barbera New Cartoon Series | 1 | 52 | 1962–1963 | Syndication | Hanna-Barbera | | | Traditional |
| The Hardy Boys | 1 | 17 | 1969 | ABC | Filmation | | | Traditional |
| The Harper House | 1 | 10 | 2021 | Paramount+ | CBS Eye Animation Productions | | TV-MA | Flash |
| The Harveytoons Show | 1 | 78 | 1950–1964 | Syndication | Famous Studios | | | Traditional |
| The Head | 1 | 14 | 1994 | MTV | Fogelmania Productions; MTV Animation | | TV-14 | Traditional |
| The Herculoids | 1 | 18 | 1967–1968 | CBS | Hanna-Barbera | | TV-Y7 | Traditional |
| The High Fructose Adventures of Annoying Orange | 3 | 60 | 2012–2014 | Cartoon Network | Annoying Orange, Inc. | | TV-PG | Live-Action/Flash |
| The Hillbilly Bears | 1 | 26 | 1965–1967 | NBC | Hanna-Barbera | | TV-G | Traditional |
| The Hot Rod Dogs and Cool Car Cats | 1 | 7 | 1995–1996 | CITV | Mike Young Productions | British co-production | | Traditional |
| The Houndcats | 1 | 13 | 1972 | NBC | DePatie–Freleng Enterprises | | | Traditional |
| The Huckleberry Hound Show | 3 | 57 | 1958–1961 | Syndication | Hanna-Barbera | | TV-G | Traditional |
| The Impossibles | 1 | 18 | 1966–1967 | CBS | Hanna-Barbera | | TV-Y7 | Traditional |
| The Incredible Crash Dummies | 1 | 13 | 2004–2005 | 4Kids TV | 4Kids Entertainment | | TV-Y7 | CGI |
| The Incredible Hulk (1982) | 1 | 13 | 1982–1983 | NBC | Marvel Productions | | TV-Y7 | Traditional |
| The Incredible Hulk (1996) | 1 | 21 | 1996–1997 | UPN | Marvel Studios | | TV-Y7 | Traditional |
| The Ink and Paint Club | 1 | 60 | 1997–1998 | The Disney Channel | Walt Disney Productions | | TV-Y | Traditional |
| The Itsy Bitsy Spider | 2 | 26 | 1993–1996 | USA Network | Hyperion Pictures | | TV-Y7 | Traditional |
| The Jackson 5ive | 1 | 23 | 1971–1972 | ABC | Rankin/Bass Productions | British co-production | | Traditional |
| The Jellies! | 2 | 20 | 2017–2019 | Adult Swim | Augenblick Studios | | TV-MA | Flash |
| The Jetsons | 3 | 75 | 1962–1963, 1985–1987 | ABC; Syndication | Hanna-Barbera | | TV-G | Traditional |
| The Karate Kid | 1 | 13 | 1989 | NBC | Saban Entertainment | | | Traditional |
| The Kid Super Power Hour with Shazam! | 1 | 36 | 1981–1982 | NBC | Filmation | | | Traditional |
| The Kids from Room 402 | 2 | 52 | 2000–2001 | Fox Family | Saban Entertainment | Canadian co-production | TV-Y7 | Traditional |
| The King Kong Show | 1 | 25 | 1966–1969 | ABC | Videocraft International | Japanese co-production. First anime-influenced Western animated television series. | | Traditional |
| The Kwicky Koala Show | 1 | 16 | 1981 | CBS | Hanna-Barbera | Australian co-production | TV-G | Traditional |
| The Land Before Time | 2 | 26 | 2007–2008 | Cartoon Network | Universal Animation Studios | | TV-Y | Traditional |
| The Last Kids on Earth | 3 | 21 | 2019–2021 | Netflix | Atomic Cartoons | Canadian co-production | TV-Y7 | Flash |
| The Legend of Calamity Jane | 1 | 13 | 1997–1998 | Kids' WB | Gangster Production | French co-production | TV-Y7 | Traditional |
| The Legend of Korra | 4 | 52 | 2012–2014 | Nickelodeon | Nickelodeon Animation Studio | Seasons 3-4 were released on Nick.com. | TV-Y7 | Traditional |
| The Legend of Prince Valiant | 2 | 65 | 1991–1993 | Kids' WB | Hearst Entertainment Productions | French-German co-production | | Traditional |
| The Legend of Tarzan | 2 | 39 | 2001–2003 | UPN | Walt Disney Television Animation | | TV-Y | Traditional |
| The Legend of Vox Machina | 1 | 24 | 2022–present | Amazon Prime Video | Amazon Studios | | TV-MA | Traditional |
| The Letter People | 1 | 60 | 1974–1976 | PBS | KETC | | | Traditional/Live-Action |
| The Liberator | 1 | 4 | 2020 | Netflix | A&E Studios | | TV-MA | Traditional |
| The Life and Times of Juniper Lee | 3 | 40 | 2005–2007 | Cartoon Network | Cartoon Network Studios | | TV-Y7 | Traditional |
| The Life & Times of Tim | 3 | 30 | 2008–2012 | HBO | Insane Loon Productions | | TV-MA | Flash |
| The Lion Guard | 3 | 74 | 2015–2019 | Disney Junior | Disney Television Animation | | TV-Y | Flash |
| The Lionhearts | 1 | 13 | 1998 | Syndication | MGM Animation | | TV-Y | Traditional |
| The Little Clowns of Happytown | 1 | 18 | 1987–1988 | ABC | Marvel Productions | | | Traditional |
| The Little Lulu Show | 3 | 52 | 1995–1999 | HBO | Golden Book Video | Canadian co-production | TV-Y | Traditional |
| The Little Mermaid | 3 | 31 | 1992–1994 | CBS | Walt Disney Television Animation | | TV-Y | Traditional |
| The Little Rascals | 1 | 22 | 1982–1983 | ABC | Hanna-Barbera | | | Traditional |
| The Littles | 1 | 29 | 1983–1985 | ABC | DIC Entertainment | French co-production | | Traditional |
| The Lone Ranger | 1 | 26 | 1966–1969 | CBS | Format Films | | | Traditional |
| The Looney Tunes Show | 2 | 52 | 2011–2013 | Cartoon Network | Warner Bros. Animation | | TV-PG | Traditional/CGI |
| The Loud House | 7 | 261 | 2016–present | Nickelodeon | Nickelodeon Animation Studio | | TV-Y7 | Flash |
| The Magic School Bus | 4 | 52 | 1994–1997 | PTV | Scholastic Productions | Canadian co-production | TV-Y7 | Traditional |
| The Magic School Bus Rides Again | 3 | 30 | 2017–2021 | Netflix | Scholastic Productions | Canadian co-production | TV-Y7 | Flash |
| The Magilla Gorilla Show | 1 | 31 | 1964–1967 | Syndication | Hanna-Barbera | | TV-G | Traditional |
| The Marvel Super Heroes | 1 | 65 | 1965–1966 | Syndication | Marvel Comics | | | Traditional |
| The Marvelous Misadventures of Flapjack | 3 | 46 | 2008–2010 | Cartoon Network | Cartoon Network Studios | | TV-Y7 | Traditional |
| The Mask: Animated Series | 3 | 54 | 1995–1997 | CBS | Film Roman | | TV-Y7 | Traditional |
| The Maxx | 1 | 13 | 1995 | MTV | MTV Animation | | TV-14 | Traditional |
| The Merrie Melodies Show | 1 | 24 | 1972 | Syndication | Warner Bros. Television | | | Traditional |
| The Metric Marvels | 1 | 7 | 1978–1979 | NBC | | | | Traditional |
| The Midnight Gospel | 1 | 8 | 2020 | Netflix | Netflix Animation | | TV-MA | Flash |
| The Mighty B! | 2 | 40 | 2008–2011 | Nickelodeon | Paper Kite Productions; Nickelodeon Animation Studio | The last 13 episodes aired on Nicktoons. | TV-Y7 | Traditional |
| The Mighty Heroes | 1 | 21 | 1966–1967 | CBS | Terrytoons | | | Traditional |
| The Mighty Hercules | 1 | 128 | 1963–1966 | Syndication | Adventure Cartoon Productions | Canadian co-production | | Traditional |
| The Mighty Nein | 1 | 8 | 2025–present | Amazon Prime Video | Titmouse, Inc. | | TV-MA | Traditional |
| The Mighty Ones | 4 | 40 | 2020–2022 | Hulu | DreamWorks Animation Television | | TV-Y7 | Flash |
| The Misfortune of Being Ned | 1 | 20 | 2013–2014 | YouTube | YouTube Studio | | | Flash |
| The Monchhichis/Little Rascals/Richie Rich Show | 1 | 13 | 1983–1984 | ABC | Hanna-Barbera | | | Traditional |
| The Most Important Person | 1 | 66 | 1972–1981 | CBS | Sutherland Learning Associates | | | Traditional/Live-action |
| The Most Popular Girls in School | 5 | 82 | 2012–2017 | YouTube | Extra Credit Studios | | | Stop-Motion |
| The Mouse and the Monster | 1 | 13 | 1996–1997 | UPN | Saban Entertainment | | | Traditional |
| The Mouse Factory | 1 | 43 | 1972–1973 | Syndication | Walt Disney Productions | | | Traditional |
| The Moxy Show | 1 | 24 | 1993–1995 | Cartoon Network | Hanna-Barbera | | TV-Y7 | CGI |
| The Mr. Men Show (1997) | 1 | 39 | 1997–1999 | Syndication | Breakthrough Entertainment | Canadian co-production | TV-Y | Traditional/Live-Action |
| The Mr. Men Show (2008) | 2 | 52 | 2008–2009 | Cartoon Network | Renegade Animation | British co-production | TV-Y | Flash |
| The Mr. Peabody & Sherman Show | 4 | 52 | 2015–2017 | Netflix | DreamWorks Animation Television | | TV-Y7 | Flash |
| The Mumbly Cartoon Show | 1 | 16 | 1976–1977 | ABC | Hanna-Barbera | | | Traditional |
| The Mummy | 1 | 26 | 2001–2003 | Kids' WB | Universal Cartoon Studios | | TV-Y7 | Traditional |
| The New 3 Stooges | 1 | 156 | 1965–1966 | Syndication | Cambria Productions | | | Traditional |
| The New Adventures of Batman | 1 | 16 | 1977 | CBS | Filmation; DC Comics | | | Traditional |
| The New Adventures of Beany and Cecil | 1 | 13 | 1988 | ABC | DIC Entertainment | | | Traditional |
| The New Adventures of Flash Gordon | 1 | 32 | 1979–1982 | NBC | Filmation | | | Traditional |
| The New Adventures of Gilligan | 1 | 24 | 1974–1975 | ABC | Filmation | | | Traditional |
| The New Adventures of He-Man | 1 | 65 | 1990 | Syndication | Mattel Television | Canadian co-production | | Traditional |
| The New Adventures of Huckleberry Finn | 1 | 20 | 1968–1969 | NBC | Hanna-Barbera | | | Traditional/Live-action |
| The New Adventures of Jonny Quest | 1 | 13 | 1986–1987 | Syndication | Hanna-Barbera | | TV-Y7 | Traditional |
| The New Adventures of the Lone Ranger | 1 | 28 | 1980–1982 | CBS | Filmation | | | Traditional |
| The New Adventures of Mighty Mouse and Heckle & Jeckle | 1 | 96 | 1979–1980 | CBS | Filmation | | | Traditional |
| The New Adventures of Pinocchio | 1 | 130 | 1961 | Syndication | Videocraft Productions | | | Stop-Motion |
| The New Adventures of Speed Racer | 1 | 13 | 1993 | Syndication | Fred Wolf Films | | | Traditional |
| The New Adventures of Superman | 4 | 68 | 1966–1970 | CBS | Filmation; DC Comics | | | Traditional |
| The New Adventures of Winnie the Pooh | 4 | 50 | 1988–1991 | The Disney Channel | Walt Disney Television Animation | | TV-Y | Traditional |
| The New Adventures of Zorro (1981) | 1 | 13 | 1981 | CBS | Filmation | | | Traditional |
| The New Adventures of Zorro (1997) | 1 | 26 | 1997–1998 | Syndication | Fred Wolf Films | | | Traditional |
| The New Archie and Sabrina Hour | 1 | 13 | 1977 | NBC | Filmation | | | Traditional |
| The New Archies | 1 | 13 | 1987 | NBC | DIC Entertainment | | | Traditional |
| The New Batman Adventures | 1 | 24 | 1997–1998 | Kids' WB | Warner Bros. Animation | | TV-Y7 | Traditional |
| The New Batman/Superman Adventures | 3 | 24 | 1997–2000 | Kids' WB | Warner Bros. Animation; DC Comics | | TV-Y7 | Traditional |
| The New Casper Cartoon Show | 1 | 26 | 1963–1964 | ABC | Paramount Cartoon Studios | | | Traditional |
| The New Fantastic Four | 1 | 13 | 1978 | NBC | DePatie–Freleng Enterprises | | TV-Y7 | Traditional |
| The New Fred and Barney Show | 1 | 17 | 1979 | NBC | Hanna-Barbera | | TV-G | Traditional |
| The New Norm | 1 | 5 | 2024–2025 | X | | | TV-MA | Flash |
| The New Scooby-Doo Movies | 2 | 24 | 1972–1973 | CBS | Hanna-Barbera | | TV-G | Traditional |
| The New Scooby Doo Mysteries | 1 | 26 | 1983–1984 | ABC | Hanna-Barbera | | TV-G | Traditional |
| The New Shmoo | 1 | 16 | 1979–1980 | NBC | Hanna-Barbera | | TV-G | Traditional |
| The New Woody Woodpecker Show | 3 | 53 | 1999–2003 | Fox Kids | Universal Cartoon Studios | | TV-Y | Traditional |
| The New Yogi Bear Show | 1 | 45 | 1988 | Syndication | Hanna-Barbera | | TV-G | Traditional |
| The Nutty Squirrels Present | 1 | 145 | 1960 | Syndication | Transfilm-Wylde Animation | | | Traditional |
| The Oblongs | 1 | 13 | 2001–2002 | The WB | Mohawk Productions | | TV-14 | Traditional |
| The Oddball Couple | 1 | 16 | 1975 | ABC | DePatie–Freleng Enterprises | | | Traditional |
| The Off-Beats | 1 | 14 | 1996–1998 | Nickelodeon | Nickelodeon Animation Studio | Segment on KaBlam!. | | Traditional |
| The Ollie & Moon Show | 2 | 52 | 2017–2021 | Universal Kids | Cottonwood Media | Canadian-French co-production | TV-Y | Flash |
| The Osmonds | 1 | 17 | 1972 | ABC | Rankin/Bass Productions | | | Traditional |
| The Owl House | 3 | 43 | 2020–2023 | Disney Channel | Disney Television Animation | | TV-Y7 | Traditional |
| The Oz Kids | 1 | 9 | 1996–1997 | Direct-to-video | Hyperion Animation | | | Traditional |
| The Pac-Man/Little Rascals/Richie Rich Show | 1 | 13 | 1982–1983 | ABC | Hanna-Barbera | | | Traditional |
| The Patrick Star Show | 2 | 63 | 2021–present | Nickelodeon | United Plankton Pictures; Nickelodeon Animation Studio | | TV-Y7 | Traditional |
| The Paz Show | 2 | 80 | 2003–2006 | Discovery Kids | | British co-production | TV-Y | Traditional |
| The Pebbles and Bamm-Bamm Show | 1 | 16 | 1971–1972 | CBS | Hanna-Barbera | | TV-G | Traditional |
| The Penguins of Madagascar | 3 | 149 | 2008–2015 | Nickelodeon | DreamWorks Animation Television; Nickelodeon Animation Studio | The last 7 episodes aired on Nicktoons. | TV-Y7 | CGI |
| The Perils of Penelope Pitstop | 1 | 17 | 1969–1970 | CBS | Hanna-Barbera | | TV-G | Traditional |
| The Peter Potamus Show | 1 | 27 | 1964–1966 | ABC | Hanna-Barbera | | TV-G | Traditional |
| The Pink Panther | 1 | 121 | 1993–1995 | Syndication | MGM Animation | | | Traditional |
| The Pink Panther Show | 1 | 190 | 1969–1980 | NBC; ABC | DePatie–Freleng Enterprises | | | Traditional |
| The Pirates of Dark Water | 1 | 21 | 1991–1993 | ABC | Hanna-Barbera | | TV-Y7 | Traditional |
| The Plastic Man Comedy/Adventure Show | 1 | 112 | 1979–1981 | ABC | Ruby-Spears Enterprises | | | Traditional |
| The Plucky Duck Show | 1 | 13 | 1992 | Fox Kids | Warner Bros. Animation | | | Traditional |
| The Popeye Show | 1 | 45 | 2001–2003 | Cartoon Network | | | TV-Y7 | Traditional |
| The Porky Pig Show | 1 | 26 | 1964–1967 | ABC | Warner Bros. Cartoons | | | Traditional |
| The Power Team | 1 | 35 | 1990–1991 | Syndication | Bohbot Entertainment | | | Traditional |
| The Powerpuff Girls (1998) | 6 | 78 | 1998–2005 | Cartoon Network | Hanna-Barbera; Cartoon Network Studios | | TV-Y7 | Traditional |
| The Powerpuff Girls (2016) | 3 | 119 | 2016–2019 | Cartoon Network | Cartoon Network Studios | | TV-Y7 | Traditional |
| The Problem Solverz | 2 | 26 | 2011–2013 | Cartoon Network | Cartoon Network Studios | The last 8 episodes aired on Netflix. | TV-PG | Flash |
| The Proud Family | 2 | 52 | 2001–2005 | Disney Channel | Jambalaya Studios | | TV-G | Traditional |
| The Proud Family: Louder and Prouder | 2 | 20 | 2022–present | Disney+ | Disney Television Animation | | TV-G | Traditional |
| The Puppy's Further Adventures | 2 | 21 | 1982–1984 | ABC | Ruby-Spears Enterprises | | | Traditional |
| The Quick Draw McGraw Show | 3 | 45 | 1959–1961 | Syndication | Hanna-Barbera | | TV-G | Traditional |
| The Real Adventures of Jonny Quest | 2 | 52 | 1996–1997 | Cartoon Network | Hanna-Barbera | | TV-Y7 | Traditional |
| The Reluctant Dragon & Mr. Toad Show | 1 | 17 | 1970 | ABC | Rankin/Bass Productions | | | Traditional |
| The Ren & Stimpy Show | 5 | 93 | 1991–1996 | Nickelodeon | Spümcø | | TV-Y7 | Traditional |
| The Replacements | 2 | 52 | 2006–2009 | Disney Channel | Walt Disney Television Animation | | TV-G | Traditional |
| The Richie Rich/Scooby-Doo Show | 1 | 21 | 1980–1981 | ABC | Hanna-Barbera | | TV-G | Traditional |
| The Ricky Gervais Show | 2 | 39 | 2010–2012 | HBO | Wildbrain Entertainment | British co-production | TV-MA | Flash |
| The Ripping Friends | 1 | 13 | 2001–2002 | Fox Kids | Spümcø | Canadian co-production | TV-Y7 | Traditional |
| The Road Runner Show | 1 | 26 | 1966–1972 | CBS | DePatie–Freleng Enterprises | | | Traditional |
| The Robonic Stooges | 1 | 16 | 1977–1978 | CBS | Hanna-Barbera | | TV-Y7 | Traditional |
| The Rocketeer | 1 | 22 | 2019–2020 | Disney Junior | Wild Canary Animation | | TV-Y | CGI |
| The Roman Holidays | 1 | 13 | 1972 | CBS | Hanna-Barbera | | | Traditional |
| The Ruff and Reddy Show | 3 | 156 | 1957–1960 | NBC | Hanna-Barbera | | TV-G | Traditional |
| The Ruff Ruffman Show | 1 | 20 | 2017 | PBS Kids | | | TV-Y | Flash |
| The Savage Dragon | 1 | 26 | 1995–1996 | USA Network | Universal Cartoon Studios | Canadian co-production | | Traditional |
| The Save-Ums! | 2 | 39 | 2003–2005 | Discovery Kids | The Dan Clark Company | Canadian co-production | TV-G | CGI |
| The Scooby & Scrappy-Doo/Puppy Hour | 1 | 13 | 1982 | ABC | Hanna-Barbera | | TV-G | Traditional |
| The Scooby-Doo/Dynomutt Hour | 1 | 16 | 1976 | ABC | Hanna-Barbera | | TV-G | Traditional |
| The Scooby-Doo Show | 3 | 40 | 1976–1978 | ABC | Hanna-Barbera | | TV-G | Traditional |
| The Second Best Hospital in the Galaxy | 1 | 8 | 2024 | Amazon Prime Video | Titmouse, Inc. | | TV-MA | Flash |
| The Secret Files of the Spy Dogs | 1 | 22 | 1998–1999 | Fox Kids | Saban Entertainment | | TV-Y | Traditional |
| The Secret Lives of Waldo Kitty | 1 | 13 | 1975 | NBC | Filmation | | | Traditional |
| The Secret Saturdays | 2 | 36 | 2008–2009 | Cartoon Network | PorchLight Entertainment | | TV-Y7 | Traditional |
| The Shivering Truth | 2 | 12 | 2018–2020 | Adult Swim | PFFR | | TV-MA | Stop-Motion |
| The Shnookums & Meat Funny Cartoon Show | 1 | 13 | 1995 | Syndication | Walt Disney Television Animation | | | Traditional |
| The Simpsons | 38 | 813 | 1989–present | Fox | Gracie Films; 20th century | | TV-PG/TV-14 | Traditional |
| The Sisters Grimm | 1 | 10 | 2025 | Apple TV | Titmouse, Inc. | | | Traditional |
| The Skatebirds | 1 | 16 | 1977–1978 | CBS | Hanna-Barbera | | | Traditional |
| The Smokey Bear Show | 1 | 17 | 1969–1970 | ABC | Rankin/Bass Enterprises | Japanese co-production | | Traditional |
| The Smurfs | 9 | 258 | 1981–1989 | NBC | Hanna-Barbera | | TV-G | Traditional |
| The Snoopy Show | 3 | 38 | 2021–2023 | Apple TV+ | Peanuts Worldwide | Canadian co-production | | Traditional |
| The Space Kidettes | 1 | 20 | 1966–1967 | NBC | Hanna-Barbera | | | Traditional |
| The Spectacular Spider-Man | 2 | 26 | 2008–2009 | The CW4Kids; Disney XD | Marvel Entertainment | | TV-Y7 | Traditional |
| The Spooktacular New Adventures of Casper | 4 | 52 | 1996–1998 | Fox Kids | Harveytoons | | | Traditional |
| The Stinky & Dirty Show | 2 | 39 | 2015–2019 | Amazon Prime Video | Amazon Studios | Irish co-production | TV-Y | CGI |
| The Super 6 | 1 | 20 | 1966–1967 | NBC | DePatie–Freleng Enterprises | | | Traditional |
| The Super Globetrotters | 1 | 13 | 1979 | NBC | Hanna-Barbera | | TV-G | Traditional |
| The Super Hero Squad Show | 2 | 52 | 2009–2011 | Cartoon Network | Marvel Animation | | TV-Y7 | Traditional |
| The Super Mario Bros. Super Show! | 1 | 65 | 1989 | Syndication | DIC Entertainment | South Korean co-production | | Traditional |
| The Super Powers Team: Galactic Guardians | 1 | 8 | 1985 | ABC | Hanna-Barbera | | | Traditional |
| The Superman/Aquaman Hour of Adventure | 1 | 36 | 1967–1968 | CBS | Filmation | | TV-Y7 | Traditional |
| The Superman/Batman Adventures | 1 | 13 | 1995 | USA Network | Filmation | | TV-Y7 | Traditional |
| The Sylvester & Tweety Mysteries | 5 | 52 | 1995–2002 | Fox Kids | Warner Bros. Animation | | TV-G | Traditional |
| The Tarzan/Lone Ranger Adventure Hour | 2 | 24 | 1980–1982 | CBS | Filmation | | | Traditional |
| The Tex Avery Show | 1 | 99 | 1996–2002 | Cartoon Network | MGM Cartoon Studio; Warner Bros. Cartoons | | | Traditional |
| The Three Musketeers | 1 | 18 | 1968–1969 | NBC | Hanna-Barbera | | TV-G | Traditional |
| The Tick | 3 | 36 | 1994–1996 | Fox Kids | Sunbow Productions | | TV-Y7 | Traditional |
| The Tiny Chef Show | 3 | 42 | 2022–2025 | Nickelodeon | Nickelodeon Animation Studio | | TV-Y | Stop-motion |
| The Tom and Jerry Comedy Show | 1 | 45 | 1980 | CBS | Filmation | | TV-G | Traditional |
| The Tom and Jerry Show (1975) | 1 | 16 | 1975 | ABC | Hanna-Barbera | | TV-G | Traditional |
| The Tom and Jerry Show (2014) | 5 | 117 | 2014–2021 | Cartoon Network; Boomerang | Warner Bros. Animation | | TV-PG | Flash |
| The Tomfoolery Show | 1 | 4 | 1970–1971 | NBC | Rankin/Bass Productions | | | Traditional |
| The Twisted Tales of Felix the Cat | 1 | 21 | 1995–1997 | CBS | Felix the Cat Productions | | TV-G | Traditional |
| The Twisted Whiskers Show | 1 | 26 | 2009–2010 | The Hub | American Greetings | Canadian-French co-production | TV-G | CGI |
| The U.S. of Archie | 1 | 16 | 1974 | CBS | Filmation | | | Traditional |
| The Underseas Explorers | | | 1961 | | | | | Traditional |
| The URL with Phred Show | 1 | 20 | 2001–2002 | Noggin | | | TV-Y | Traditional |
| The VeggieTales Show | 1 | 26 | 2019–2022 | Trinity Broadcasting Network | Big Idea Productions | | TV-Y | CGI |
| The Wacky Adventures of Ronald McDonald | 1 | 6 | 1998–2000 | Direct-to-video | Klasky Csupo | | TV-G | Traditional |
| The Wacky World of Tex Avery | 1 | 65 | 1997 | Syndication | DIC Entertainment | French co-production | TV-Y7 | Traditional |
| The Weekenders | 2 | 39 | 2000–2004 | ABC; UPN; Toon Disney | Walt Disney Television Animation | | TV-Y7 | Traditional |
| The Why Why Family | 1 | 26 | 1996 | Syndication | Saban Entertainment | French co-production | | Traditional |
| The Wild Thornberrys | 5 | 91 | 1998–2004 | Nickelodeon | Klasky Csupo | | TV-Y7 | Traditional |
| The Wizard of Oz | 1 | 13 | 1990 | ABC | DIC Entertainment | | TV-Y | Traditional |
| The Wonderful Stories of Professor Kitzel | 1 | 105 | 1972 | Syndication | Krantz Films | Canadian co-production | | Traditional |
| The Wonderful World of Mickey Mouse | 3 | 25 | 2020–2023 | Disney+ | Disney Television Animation | | TV-G | Traditional |
| The Wonderfully Weird World of Gumball | 1 | 40 | 2025–present | Hulu | Hanna-Barbera Studios Europe | British-German co-production | TV-Y7 | CGI/Flash/Stop-motion/Traditional |
| The Woody Woodpecker Show | 5 | 113 | 1957–1977 | ABC | Walter Lantz Productions | | | Traditional |
| The World's Greatest SuperFriends | 1 | 8 | 1979–1980 | ABC | Hanna-Barbera | | TV-Y7 | Traditional |
| The Wuzzles | 1 | 13 | 1985 | CBS | Walt Disney Pictures Television Animation Group | | | Traditional |
| The X's | 1 | 20 | 2005–2006 | Nickelodeon | Nickelodeon Animation Studio | One episode was left unaired. | TV-Y7 | Traditional |
| The Xtacles | 1 | 2 | 2008 | Adult Swim | Williams Street | | TV-MA | Flash |
| The Yogi Bear Show | 2 | 33 | 1961–1962 | Syndication | Hanna-Barbera | | TV-G | Traditional |
| The Zeta Project | 1 | 26 | 2001–2002 | Kids' WB | Warner Bros. Animation | | TV-Y7 | Traditional |
| The ZhuZhus | 1 | 26 | 2016–2017 | Disney Channel | Cepia LLC | Canadian co-production | TV-Y7 | Flash |
| The Zula Patrol | 3 | 52 | 2005–2008 | PBS Kids | The Hatchery | | TV-Y | CGI |
| These Are the Days | 1 | 16 | 1974–1975 | ABC | Hanna-Barbera | | | Traditional |
| This Is America, Charlie Brown | 1 | 8 | 1988–1989 | CBS | Lee Mendelson Film Productions | | | Traditional |
| This Just In! | 1 | 4 | 2004 | Spike | Spike Animation | | TV-MA | Flash |
| Three Delivery | 1 | 26 | 2008–2009 | Nicktoons Network | Animation Collective | Canadian co-production | TV-Y7 | Flash |
| Thomas & Friends: All Engines Go | 4 | 139 | 2021–present | Cartoonito | Mattel Television | Canadian co-production | TV-Y | Flash |
| Thundarr the Barbarian | 1 | 21 | 1980–1981 | ABC | Ruby-Spears Productions | | TV-Y7 | Traditional |
| ThunderCats (1985) | 4 | 130 | 1985–1989 | Syndication | Rankin/Bass Productions | | TV-Y7 | Traditional |
| ThunderCats (2011) | 1 | 26 | 2011–2012 | Cartoon Network | Warner Bros. Animation | Japanese co-production | TV-PG | Traditional |
| ThunderCats Roar | 1 | 26 | 2020 | Cartoon Network | Warner Bros. Animation | | TV-Y7 | Traditional |
| Tig n' Seek | 3 | 80 | 2020–2022 | Max; Cartoon Network | Cartoon Network Studios | | TV-Y7 | Traditional |
| TigerSharks | 1 | 20 | 1987 | Syndication | Rankin/Bass Productions | | | Traditional |
| Tigtone | 2 | 20 | 2019–2022 | Adult Swim | Williams Street | | TV-MA | CGI |
| Time Squad | 2 | 26 | 2001–2003 | Cartoon Network | Cartoon Network Studios | | TV-Y7 | Traditional |
| Time Warp Trio | 1 | 26 | 2005–2006 | Discovery Kids | Soup2Nuts; WGBH | Canadian co-production | TV-Y7 | Flash |
| Timon & Pumbaa | 3 | 85 | 1995–1999 | CBS | Walt Disney Television Animation | | TV-Y7 | Traditional |
| Tiny Planets | 1 | 65 | 2001–2002 | Noggin | Sesame Workshop | British co-production | TV-Y | CGI |
| Tiny Toon Adventures | 3 | 98 | 1990–1995 | Syndication; Fox Kids | Warner Bros. Animation | | TV-Y7 | Traditional |
| Tiny Toons Looniversity | 1 | 10 | 2023–present | Max | Warner Bros. Animation | | TV-Y7 | Traditional |
| Titan Maximum | 1 | 9 | 2009 | Adult Swim | Stoop!d Monkey | | TV-14 | Stop-motion |
| ToddWorld | 1 | 39 | 2004–2008 | Discovery Kids | Mike Young Productions | Canadian co-production | TV-Y | Flash |
| Tom and Jerry in New York | 1 | 13 | 2021 | HBO Max | Warner Bros. Animation | | TV-Y7 | Flash |
| Tom & Jerry Kids | 4 | 65 | 1990–1993 | Fox Kids Network | Hanna-Barbera | | TV-G | Traditional |
| Tom and Jerry Special Shorts | 1 | 2 | 2021 | HBO Max | Warner Bros. Animation | | TV-Y7 | Traditional |
| Tom and Jerry Tales | 2 | 26 | 2006–2008 | Kids' WB | Warner Bros. Animation | | TV-Y7 | Traditional |
| Tom Goes to the Mayor | 2 | 30 | 2004–2006 | Adult Swim | Williams Street | | TV-MA | Stop-motion |
| Tom Slick | 1 | 17 | 1967 | ABC | Jay Ward Productions | | | Traditional |
| Tom Terrific | 1 | 26 | 1957–1959 | CBS | Terrytoons | | | Traditional |
| Tomb Raider: The Legend of Lara Croft | 2 | 16 | 2024–2025 | Netflix | Powerhouse Animation Studios | | TV-MA | Traditional |
| Too Cool! Cartoons | 1 | 11 | 2013–2014 | YouTube | Frederator Studios | | | Traditional/Flash |
| Toon In with Me | 6 | 1,100 | 2021–present | MeTV | | | TV-PG | Traditional/Live-Action |
| Tooning Out the News | 3 | 263 | 2020–2023 | Paramount+ | Spartina Productions | | TV-MA | Flash |
| ToonHeads | 8 | 102 | 1992–2003 | Cartoon Network | | | | Traditional |
| Toonsylvania | 1 | 21 | 1998–1999 | Fox Kids | DreamWorks Animation Television | | TV-Y | Traditional |
| Toot & Puddle | 1 | 26 | 2008–2009 | Noggin | National Geographic Kids | Canadian co-production | TV-Y | Traditional |
| Tooter Turtle | 1 | 39 | 1960–1961 | NBC | Total Television | | | Traditional |
| Top Cat | 1 | 30 | 1961–1962 | ABC | Hanna-Barbera | | TV-G | Traditional |
| Total DramaRama | 3 | 153 | 2018–2023 | Cartoon Network | Fresh TV | Canadian co-production | TV-Y7 | Flash |
| Totally Tooned In | 1 | 65 | 1999–2000 | Syndication | Associated Studios | | TV-Y7 | Traditional |
| Touché Turtle and Dum Dum | 1 | 52 | 1962–1963 | Syndication | Hanna-Barbera | | TV-G | Traditional |
| Toxic Crusaders | 1 | 13 | 1991 | Syndication | Fred Wolf Films | | | Traditional |
| Toy Story Toons | 1 | 3 | 2011–2012 | Disney Channel | Pixar Animation Studios | | TV-G | CGI |
| Toy Story Treats | 1 | 54 | 1996 | ABC | Pixar Animation Studios | | | CGI |
| Transformers: Animated | 3 | 42 | 2007–2009 | Cartoon Network | Cartoon Network Studios | | TV-Y7 | Traditional |
| Transformers: Armada | 1 | 52 | 2002–2003 | Cartoon Network | SD Entertainment | Japanese co-production | TV-Y7 | Traditional |
| Transformers: BotBots | 1 | 10 | 2022 | Netflix | Hasbro Studios | Canadian-Irish co-production | TV-Y7 | Flash |
| Transformers: Combiner Wars | 1 | 10 | 2016 | go90 | Hasbro Studios | Japanese co-production | | CGI |
| Transformers: Cyberverse | 4 | 71 | 2018–2021 | Cartoon Network | Allspark | Irish co-production. Season 4 aired on Netflix. | TV-Y7 | CGI |
| Transformers: EarthSpark | 4 | 46 | 2022–2025 | Paramount+ | Nickelodeon Animation Studio | Canadian co-production | TV-Y7 | CGI |
| Transformers: Generation One | 4 | 98 | 1984–1987 | Syndication | Sunbow Entertainment | | TV-PG | Traditional |
| Transformers: Generation 2 | 1 | 52 | 1993 | go90 | | Japanese co-production | | CGI |
| Transformers: Power of the Primes | 1 | 10 | 2018 | go90 | Hasbro Studios | | | CGI |
| Transformers: Prime | 3 | 65 | 2010–2013 | The Hub | Hasbro Studios | | TV-Y7 | CGI |
| Transformers: Rescue Bots | 4 | 104 | 2012–2016 | The Hub Network / Discovery Family | Hasbro Studios | Australian-Canadian-Malaysian co-production | TV-Y7 | Flash |
| Transformers: Rescue Bots Academy | 2 | 104 | 2019–2021 | Discovery Family | Allspark | Irish co-production | TV-Y | Flash |
| Transformers: Robots in Disguise | 3 | 71 | 2015–2017 | Cartoon Network | Hasbro Studios | | TV-Y7 | Traditional |
| Transformers: Titans Return | 1 | 10 | 2017–2018 | go90 | Hasbro Studios | | | CGI |
| Transformers: War for Cybertron Trilogy | 1 | 18 | 2020–2021 | Netflix | Rooster Teeth | Japanese co-production | | CGI |
| Trash Truck | 1 | 28 | 2020–2021 | Netflix | Netflix Animation | | TV-Y | CGI |
| Treehouse Detectives | 1 | 20 | 2018 | Netflix | Saban Brands | South Korean co-production | TV-Y | CGI |
| TripTank | 2 | 28 | 2015–2016 | Comedy Central | ShadowMachine | | TV-MA | Flash |
| Tripping the Rift | 3 | 39 | 2004–2007 | Sci Fi | Film Roman | Canadian co-production | TV-MA | CGI |
| Trollhunters: Tales of Arcadia | 3 | 52 | 2016–2018 | Netflix | DreamWorks Animation Television | | TV-Y7 | CGI |
| Trollkins | 1 | 13 | 1981–1982 | CBS | Hanna-Barbera | | | Traditional |
| Trolls: The Beat Goes On! | 8 | 52 | 2018–2019 | Netflix | DreamWorks Animation Television | | TV-Y7 | Traditional |
| Trolls: TrollsTopia | 7 | 52 | 2020–2022 | Hulu; Peacock | DreamWorks Animation Television | | TV-Y7 | Flash |
| Trollz | 1 | 27 | 2005 | Syndication | DIC Entertainment | | TV-Y7 | Traditional |
| Tron: Uprising | 1 | 19 | 2012–2013 | Disney XD | Disney Television Animation | | TV-Y7 | CGI |
| True and the Rainbow Kingdom | 2 | 26 | 2017–2019 | Netflix | Home Plate Entertainment | Canadian co-production | TV-Y | CGI |
| Tuca & Bertie | 3 | 30 | 2019–2022 | Netflix; Adult Swim | ShadowMachine | | TV-MA | Flash |
| Tumble Leaf | 4 | 51 | 2014–2019 | Amazon Prime Video | Amazon Studios; Bix Pix Entertainment | | TV-Y | CGI |
| Turbo Dogs | 1 | 26 | 2008–2011 | Qubo | Scholastic Corporation | Canadian co-production | TV-Y7 | CGI |
| Turbo Fast | 3 | 52 | 2013–2016 | Netflix | DreamWorks Animation Television | | TV-Y7 | Flash |
| Turbo Teen | 1 | 13 | 1984 | ABC | Ruby-Spears Enterprises | | | Traditional |
| Tutenstein | 3 | 39 | 2003–2008 | Discovery Kids | PorchLight Entertainment | | TV-Y7 | Traditional |
| Tuttle Twins | 3 | 37 | 2021–present | YouTube | Angel Studios | | | Traditional |
| TV Funhouse | 1 | 8 | 2000–2001 | Comedy Central | Poochie Doochie Productions | | TV-MA | Traditional/Live-action |
| Twelve Forever | 1 | 25 | 2019 | Netflix | Puny Entertainment | | TV-Y7 | Traditional |
| Twilight of the Gods | 1 | 10 | 2024 | Netflix | The Stone Quarry | | | Traditional |
| Twinkle, the Dream Being | 1 | 26 | 1992–1993 | Syndication | Zodiac Entertainment | South Korean co-production | | Traditional |
| Two More Eggs | 3 | 90 | 2015–2017 | Disney XD | Disney Television Animation | | TV-Y7 | Flash |

=== U ===
| Title | Seasons | Episodes | Year | Original channel | American company | Note | Age rating | Technique |
|---|---|---|---|---|---|---|---|---|
| Ugly Americans | 2 | 31 | 2010–2012 | Comedy Central | Augenblick Studios | Canadian co-production | TV-14 | Flash |
| Ultimate Spider-Man | 4 | 104 | 2012–2017 | Disney XD | Marvel Animation | | TV-Y7 | Traditional |
| Ultraforce | 1 | 13 | 1994–1995 | USA Network | DIC Entertainment | Canadian co-production | TV-PG | Traditional |
| Uncle Croc's Block | 1 | 16 | 1975–1976 | ABC | Filmation | | —N/a | Traditional/Live-action |
| Uncle Grandpa | 5 | 153 | 2013–2017 | Cartoon Network | Cartoon Network Studios | | TV-PG | Traditional |
| Undercover Elephant | 1 | 13 | 1977 | NBC | Hanna-Barbera | | —N/a | Traditional |
| Underdog | 1 | 124 | 1964–1967 | NBC | Total Television; Leonardo Television | | TV-G | Traditional |
| Undone | 2 | 16 | 2019–2021 | Amazon Prime Video | Amazon Studios | | TV-MA | Traditional |
| Undergrads | 1 | 13 | 2001 | MTV | MTV Animation | Canadian co-production | TV-14 | Traditional |
| Unicorn: Warriors Eternal | 1 | 9 | 2023 | Adult Swim | Cartoon Network Studios | | TV-PG | Traditional |
| Unikitty! | 3 | 104 | 2017–2020 | Cartoon Network | The Lego Group; Warner Bros. Animation | | TV-Y7 | Flash |
| Universal Basic Guys | 1 | 13 | 2024–present | Fox | Sony Pictures Television; Bento Box Entertainment | | TV-14 | Flash |
| Unsupervised | 1 | 13 | 2012 | FX | Floyd County Productions | | TV-MA | Flash |

=== V ===
| Title | Seasons | Episodes | Year | Original channel | American company | Note | Age rating | Technique |
|---|---|---|---|---|---|---|---|---|
| Valley of the Dinosaurs | 1 | 16 | 1974 | CBS | Hanna-Barbera | | TV-Y7 | Traditional |
| Vampirina | 3 | 147 | 2017–2021 | Disney Junior | Brown Bag Films | | TV-Y | CGI |
| Van-Pires | 1 | 13 | 1997 | Syndication | Abrams/Gentile Entertainment | | —N/a | CGI |
| Vegetable Soup | 2 | 78 | 1975–1978 | Syndication | NYSED | | —N/a | Traditional/Live-action |
| VeggieTales | | 50 | 1993–2015 | Direct-to-video | Big Idea Productions | | TV-Y | CGI |
| VeggieTales in the City | 2 | 26 | 2017 | Netflix | Big Idea Productions | | TV-Y | CGI |
| VeggieTales in the House | 4 | 52 | 2014–2016 | Netflix | Big Idea Productions | | TV-Y | CGI |
| Velma | 2 | 21 | 2023–2024 | Max | Warner Bros. Animation | | TV-MA | Traditional |
| VH1 ILL-ustrated | 1 | 13 | 2003–2004 | VH1 | Camp Chaos Productions | | —N/a | Traditional |
| Victor and Valentino | 3 | 119 | 2019–2022 | Cartoon Network | Cartoon Network Studios | | TV-Y7 | Traditional |
| Video Mods | 1 | 6 | 2004–2005 | MTV2 | Big Bear Entertainment | | —N/a | CGI |
| Video Power | 1 | 83 | 1990–1992 | Syndication | Saban Entertainment | | TV-Y7 | Traditional/Live-Action |
| Visionaries: Knights of the Magical Light | 1 | 13 | 1987 | Syndication | Sunbow Entertainment | | TV-Y7 | Traditional |
| Viva Piñata | 2 | 52 | 2006–2009 | 4Kids TV | Bardel Entertainment | Canadian co-production | TV-Y7 | CGI |
| Vixen | 1 | 12 | 2015–2016 | CW Seed | Warner Bros. Animation; DC Entertainment | | TV-14 | Traditional |
| Voltron | 3 | 124 | 1984–1985 | Syndication | World Events Productions | Japanese co-production | TV-Y7 | Traditional |
| Voltron Force | 1 | 26 | 2011–2012 | Nicktoons | World Events Productions | Canadian co-production | TV-Y7 | Traditional |
| Voltron: Legendary Defender | 8 | 78 | 2016–2018 | Netflix | DreamWorks Animation Television | | TV-Y7 | Traditional |
| Voltron: The Third Dimension | 1 | 26 | 1998–2000 | Syndication | Mike Young Productions | | TV-Y7 | CGI |
| Vor-Tech: Undercover Conversion Squad | 1 | 13 | 1996 | ABC | Universal Cartoon Studios | Canadian-French co-production | —N/a | Traditional |
| Vytor: The Starfire Champion | 1 | 4 | 1989 | Syndication | World Events Productions | | —N/a | Traditional |

=== W ===
| Title | Seasons | Episodes | Year | Original channel | American company | Note | Age rating | Technique |
|---|---|---|---|---|---|---|---|---|
| W.I.T.C.H. | 2 | 52 | 2004–2006 | ABC | The Walt Disney Company | French co-production | TV-Y7 | Traditional |
| Wacky Races (1968) | 1 | 17 | 1968–1969 | CBS | Hanna-Barbera | | TV-G | Traditional |
| Wacky Races (2017) | 2 | 43 | 2017–2019 | Boomerang | Warner Bros. Animation | | TV-Y7 | Traditional |
| Wait Till Your Father Gets Home | 3 | 48 | 1972–1974 | Syndication | Hanna-Barbera | First adult animated television series. | TV-Y7 | Traditional |
| Wake, Rattle, and Roll | 1 | 50 | 1990–1991 | Syndication | Hanna-Barbera | | TV-Y7 | Traditional/Live-action |
| Wally Gator | 1 | 52 | 1962–1963 | Syndication | Hanna-Barbera | | TV-G | Traditional |
| Wallykazam! | 3 | 52 | 2014–2017 | Nickelodeon | Nickelodeon Animation Studio | | TV-Y | CGI |
| Walter Melon | 2 | 52 | 1997–1998 | Fox Family | Saban Entertainment | French co-production | TV-Y | Traditional |
| Wander Over Yonder | 3 | 43 | 2013–2016 | Disney Channel (2013-14); Disney XD (2014-16) | Disney Television Animation | | TV-Y7 | Flash |
| Watership Down | 1 | 4 | 2018 | Netflix | Biscuit Filmworks | British co-production | TV-PG | CGI |
| Waynehead | 1 | 13 | 1996–1997 | Kids' WB | Warner Bros. Animation | Canadian co-production | TV-Y | Traditional |
| We Baby Bears | 2 | 55 | 2022–present | Cartoon Network | Cartoon Network Studios | | TV-Y7 | Traditional |
| We Bare Bears | 4 | 140 | 2015–2019 | Cartoon Network | Cartoon Network Studios | | TV-Y7 | Traditional |
| We the People | 1 | 10 | 2021 | Netflix | Netflix Animation | | TV-Y7 | Traditional |
| Weather Hunters | 1 | 26 | 2025–present | PBS Kids | Al Roker Entertainment; Silver Creek Falls Entertainment | | TV-Y | CGI |
| Weird-Ohs | 1 | 13 | 1999–2000 | Fox Family | Testor Corporation | Canadian co-production | TV-Y7 | CGI |
| Welcome to the Wayne | 3 | 30 | 2017–2019 | Nickelodeon | Nickelodeon Animation Studio | Canadian co-production. Season 1, Episodes 10-20 and Season 2 aired on Nicktoons. | TV-Y7 | Traditional |
| WellieWishers | 1 | 26 | 2016–2017 | Amazon Prime Video | Mattel Television | Dutch co-production | TV-Y | Traditional |
| We're Lalaloopsy | 1 | 13 | 2017 | Netflix | Splash Entertainment | | TV-Y | Flash |
| What a Cartoon! | | 48 | 1995–1997 | Cartoon Network | Hanna-Barbera | | TV-Y7 | Traditional |
| What-a-Mess | 1 | 47 | 1996 | ABC | DIC Entertainment | British co-production | TV-Y | Traditional |
| What If...? | 3 | 26 | 2021–2024 | Disney+ | Marvel Studios Animation | | TV-14 | CGI |
| What's New, Mr. Magoo? | 1 | 16 | 1977 | CBS | DePatie–Freleng Enterprises | | —N/a | Traditional |
| What's New, Scooby-Doo? | 3 | 42 | 2002–2006 | Kids' WB | Warner Bros. Animation | | TV-Y7 | Traditional |
| What's with Andy? | 2 | 26 | 2001–2002 | Fox Kids | CinéGroupe | Canadian co-production. Season 1 only. | TV-Y7 | Traditional |
| Whatever Happened to... Robot Jones? | 1 | 14 | 2002–2003 | Cartoon Network | Hanna-Barbera (pilot); Cartoon Network Studios | | TV-Y7 | Traditional |
| Wheelie and the Chopper Bunch | 1 | 13 | 1974 | NBC | Hanna-Barbera | | —N/a | Traditional |
| Where My Dogs At? | 1 | 8 | 2006 | MTV2 | MTV Animation | | TV-14 | Traditional |
| Where on Earth Is Carmen Sandiego? | 4 | 40 | 1994–1999 | Fox Kids | DIC Entertainment | | TV-Y7 | Traditional |
| Where's Huddles? | 1 | 10 | 1970 | CBS | Hanna-Barbera | | TV-G | Traditional |
| Where's My Water?: Swampy's Underground Adventures | 1 | 12 | 2012–2013 | Disney Channel | Animax Entertainment | | TV-Y7 | Flash |
| Where's Wally? | 1 | 13 | 1991 | CBS | DIC Enterprises | British-Canadian co-production | TV-G | Traditional |
| Where's Waldo? | 2 | 40 | 2019–2021 | Universal Kids | DreamWorks Animation Television | | TV-Y | Flash |
| Whisker Haven | 1 | 31 | 2015–2017 | Disney Junior | Disney Publishing | | TV-Y | Flash |
| Widget | 2 | 65 | 1990–1991 | Syndication | Zodiac Entertainment | | TV-Y7 | Traditional |
| Wild C.A.T.s | 1 | 13 | 1994–1995 | CBS | Nelvana | Canadian co-production | TV-Y7 | Traditional |
| Wild Grinders | 2 | 52 | 2012–2015 | Nicktoons | Home Plate Entertainment | Canadian-Irish co-production | TV-Y7 | Flash |
| Wild Life | 1 | 6 | 2021 | Syfy | TZGZ Productions | | TV-MA | Flash |
| Wild West C.O.W.-Boys of Moo Mesa | 1 | 26 | 1992–1993 | ABC | King World Productions | | TV-Y7 | Traditional |
| Wildfire | 1 | 13 | 1986 | CBS | Hanna-Barbera | | TV-Y | Traditional |
| Will the Real Jerry Lewis Please Sit Down | 1 | 18 | 1974–1975 | ABC | Filmation | | —N/a | Traditional |
| Wing Commander Academy | 1 | 13 | 1996 | USA Network | Universal Cartoon Studios | | TV-Y7 | Traditional |
| Winky Dink and You | 1 | 65 | 1953–1957, 1969–1973 | CBS; Broadcast syndication | Universal Television | | —N/a | Traditional |
| Winsome Witch | 1 | 26 | 1965–1966 | NBC | Hanna-Barbera | | TV-G | Traditional |
| Winx Club (revival series) | 3 | 78 | 2011–2016 | Nickelodeon | Nickelodeon Animation Studio | Italian co-production. Seasons 5-7 only. | TV-Y7 | Traditional |
| Win or Lose | 1 | 8 | 2025 | Disney+ | Pixar Animation Studios | | TV-PG | CGI |
| Wish Kid | 1 | 13 | 1991 | NBC | DIC Entertainment | Italian co-production | TV-Y | Traditional |
| Wishenpoof! | 2 | 39 | 2014–2019 | Amazon Prime Video | Amazon Studios; Out of the Blue Enterprises | Canadian co-production | TV-Y | CGI |
| Wizards: Tales of Arcadia | 1 | 10 | 2020 | Netflix | DreamWorks Animation Television | | TV-Y7 | CGI |
| Wolfboy and the Everything Factory | 2 | 20 | 2021–2022 | Apple TV+ | Bento Box Entertainment | British co-production | TV-Y7 | Flash |
| Wolf Rock TV | 1 | 7 | 1984 | ABC | DIC Entertainment | | —N/a | Traditional |
| Wolverine and the X-Men | 1 | 26 | 2009 | Nicktoons | Marvel Entertainment | | TV-Y7 | Traditional |
| Wonder Pets! | 3 | 62 | 2006–2016 | Nickelodeon | Nickelodeon Animation Studio; Little Airplane Productions | | TV-Y | Flash |
| Wonder Pets: In the City | 1 | 13 | 2024 | Apple TV | Nickelodeon Animation Studio | | TV-Y | Flash |
| Wonder Showzen | 2 | 16 | 2005–2006 | MTV2 | PFFR | | TV-MA | Flash/Traditional/Live-Action |
| Wonder Wheels | 1 | 16 | 1977–1978 | CBS | Hanna-Barbera | | —N/a | Traditional |
| WondLa | 3 | 20 | 2024–2025 | Apple TV+ | Skydance Animation | | TV-PG | CGI |
| Woody Woodpecker | 3 | 30 | 2018–2022 | YouTube | Splash Entertainment | | TV-Y7 | Flash |
| Word Party | 5 | 60 | 2016–2021 | Netflix | The Jim Henson Company | | TV-Y | CGI |
| Word Party Presents: Math! | 1 | 10 | 2021 | Netflix | The Jim Henson Company | | TV-Y | CGI |
| WordGirl | 8 | 130 | 2007–2015 | PBS Kids Go! (2007–13); PBS Kids (2013–15) | Soup2Nuts; Scholastic Entertainment | | TV-Y7 | Flash |
| WordWorld | 3 | 45 | 2007–2011 | PBS Kids | The Learning Box | | TV-Y | CGI |
| Work It Out Wombats! | 1 | 40 | 2023–present | PBS Kids | WGBH | Canadian co-production | TV-Y | Flash |
| World of Quest | 2 | 26 | 2008–2009 | Kids' WB | Cookie Jar | Canadian co-production (season 1) | TV-Y7 | Flash |
| Wow! Wow! Wubbzy! | 2 | 52 | 2006–2010 | Nickelodeon | Bolder Media; Starz Media | | TV-Y | Flash |
| WWE Slam City | 1 | 26 | 2014 | WWE Network | WWE | | TV-Y7 | Stop-Motion |
| Wylde Pak | 1 | 13 | 2025–present | Nickelodeon | Nickelodeon Animation Studio | | TV-Y7 | Traditional |

=== X ===
| Title | Seasons | Episodes | Year | Original channel | American company | Note | Age rating | Technique |
|---|---|---|---|---|---|---|---|---|
| X-Men '97 | 1 | 10 | 2024–present | Disney+ | Marvel Studios Animation | | TV-14 | Traditional |
| X-Men: The Animated Series | 5 | 76 | 1992–1997 | Fox Kids Network | Marvel Entertainment Group | Canadian co-production | TV-Y7 | Traditional |
| X-Men: Evolution | 4 | 52 | 2000–2003 | Kids' WB | Marvel Studios | | TV-Y7 | Traditional |
| Xavier Riddle and the Secret Museum | 2 | 47 | 2019–2022 | PBS Kids | Brown Bag Films | Canadian co-production | TV-Y | Flash |
| Xavier: Renegade Angel | 2 | 20 | 2007–2009 | Adult Swim | PFFR; Williams Street | | TV-MA | CGI |
| Xiaolin Chronicles | 1 | 26 | 2013–2015 | Disney XD | ActionFliks Media Corporation | French co-production. The last 6 episodes aired on Netflix. | TV-Y7 | Traditional/CGI |
| Xiaolin Showdown | 3 | 52 | 2003–2006 | Kids' WB | Warner Bros. Animation | | TV-Y7 | Traditional |
| Xyber 9: New Dawn | 1 | 22 | 1999–2007 | Fox Kids | Saban Entertainment | | TV-Y7 | Traditional |

=== Y ===
| Title | Seasons | Episodes | Year | Original channel | American company | Note | Age rating | Technique |
|---|---|---|---|---|---|---|---|---|
| Yabba Dabba Dinosaurs | 2 | 26 | 2021–2022 | HBO Max | Warner Bros. Animation | | TV-Y7 | Flash |
| Yin Yang Yo! | 2 | 65 | 2006–2009 | Jetix (on Toon Disney) (2006–09); Disney XD (2009) | Jetix Animation Concepts | Canadian co-production | TV-Y7 | Flash |
| Yippee, Yappee and Yahooey | 1 | 23 | 1964–1967 | Syndication | Hanna-Barbera | | —N/a | Flash |
| Yo Gabba Gabba! | 4 | 66 | 2007–2015 | Nickelodeon | Wildbrain Entertainment | Canadian co-production | TV-Y | Flash/Live-action |
| Yo Yogi! | 1 | 13 | 1991 | NBC | Hanna-Barbera | | TV-G | Traditional |
| Yogi Bear & Friends | 1 | 96 | 1967–1968 | Syndication | Hanna-Barbera | | TV-G | Traditional |
| Yogi's Gang | 1 | 15 | 1973 | ABC | Hanna-Barbera | | TV-G | Traditional |
| Yogi's Space Race | 1 | 13 | 1978 | NBC | Hanna-Barbera | | TV-G | Traditional |
| Yogi's Treasure Hunt | 3 | 27 | 1985–1988 | Syndication | Hanna-Barbera | | TV-G | Traditional |
| YOLO | 1 | 16 | 2020–2025 | Adult Swim | Williams Street | Australian co-production | TV-14 | Flash |
| You're Not a Monster | 1 | 10 | 2019 | IMDB | Bold Soul Studios | | TV-MA | Flash |
| Young David | 1 | 5 | 2023–2024 | | Angel Studios | South African co-production | TV-Y | CGI |
| Young Justice | 5 | 98 | 2010–2022 | Cartoon Network; DC Universe; HBO Max | Warner Bros. Animation; DC Entertainment | | TV-PG | Traditional |
| Young Love | 1 | 12 | 2023 | Max | Sony Pictures Animation | | TV-PG | Flash |
| Young Robin Hood | 1 | 26 | 1991–1992 | Syndication | Hanna-Barbera | Canadian co-production | —N/a | Traditional |
| Your Friendly Neighborhood Spider-Man | 1 | 2 | 2025–present | Disney+ | Marvel Studios Animation | | TV-PG | CGI |

=== Z ===
| Title | Seasons | Episodes | Year | Original channel | American company | Note | Age rating | Technique |
|---|---|---|---|---|---|---|---|---|
| Zafari | 2 | 52 | 2018–2019 | Peacock | Zafari Productions | Canadian co-production | TV-Y | CGI |
| Zak Storm | 1 | 39 | 2016–2018 | Discovery Family | Man of Action Entertainment | French-Indonesian-Italian-South Korean co-production | TV-Y7 | CGI |
| Zazoo U | 1 | 13 | 1990 | Fox Children's Network | Film Roman | | —N/a | Traditional |
| Zevo-3 | 1 | 26 | 2010–2011 | Nicktoons | MoonScoop Entertainment | | TV-Y7 | Traditional |
| Zoboomafoo | 2 | 65 | 1999–2001 | PBS Kids | Maryland Public Television | Canadian co-production | TV-Y | Stop-motion/Live-action |
| Zokie of Planet Ruby | 1 | 26 | 2023 | Amazon Prime Video | Nelvana | Canadian co-production | TV-Y7 | Flash |
| Zombie College | 1 | 12 | 2000–2001 | | icebox.com | | —N/a | Flash |
| Zombies: The Re-Animated Series | 1 | 10 | 2024–present | Disney Channel | Disney Television Animation | Canadian co-production | TV-Y7 | CGI |
| Zootopia+ | 1 | 6 | 2022 | Disney+ | Walt Disney Animation Studios | | TV-PG | CGI |

== Live-action series that used animation ==
| Title | Episodes | Year | Original channel | American company | Note | Usage |
|---|---|---|---|---|---|---|
| Batman (1966) | 120 | 1966–1968 | ABC | Greenway Productions | | Theme song |
| Bear in the Big Blue House | 118 | 1997–2006 | Playhouse Disney | The Jim Henson Company | | Live-Action Puppetry combined with Animated Segments |
| Bewitched | 254 | 1964–1972 | ABC | Screen Gems | | Theme song |
| Bobcat Goldthwait's Misfits & Monsters | 8 | 2018 | TruTV | Left/Right Productions | | Various animated segments |
| The Book of Pooh | 51 | 2001–2003 | Playhouse Disney | Shadow Projects | | Live-Action Puppetry combined with Animated Scenery |
| Choo-Choo Soul | 23 | 2006–2013 | Disney Junior | | | Combined with Live-Action and CGI animation |
| Disjointed | 20 | 2017–2018 | Netflix | Chuck Lorre Productions | | Carter's trip |
| The Electric Company (1971) | 780 | 1971–1977 | PBS | Children's Television Workshop | | Various animated segments |
| The Electric Company (2009) | 60 | 2009–2012 | PBS Kids Go! | Sesame Workshop | | Various animated segments |
| Hi-5 | 70 | 2003–2006 | Discovery Kids | Kids Like Us | | Theme song |
| Hubworld | 52 | 2010–2011 | The Hub | Hasbro Studios | | Clips on animated TV shows |
| I Dream of Jeannie | 139 | 1965–1970 | NBC | Screen Gems | | Theme song |
| Kirby Buckets | 59 | 2014–2017 | Disney XD | Horizon Productions, Inc | | Kirby's drawings |
| Kratts' Creatures | 53 | 1996 | PTV | Maryland Public Television | Canadian co-production | Ttark the dinosaur |
| Lizzie McGuire | 65 | 2001–2004 | Disney Channel | Stan Rogow Productions | | Lizzie McGuire as the cartoon character |
| Mad TV | 321 | 1995–2009 | Fox | Quincy Jones-David Salzman Entertainment | | Various animated segments |
| Noodle and Doodle | 26 | 2010–2013 | Sprout | Enthusiastic Productions | | Doggity's animated segments |
| Pee-wee's Playhouse | 45 | 1986–1990 | CBS | Pee-Wee Pictures | | Penny Shorts and Various Animated Segments |
| Pinwheel | 260 | 1977–1984 | Nickelodeon | QUBE | | Various animated segments |
| Reading Rainbow | 155 | 1983–2006 | PBS Kids | WNED | | Opening sequence |
| Saturday Night Live | 948 | 1975–present | NBC | Broadway Video | | Various animated segments |
| Square One Television | 230 | 1987–1992 | PBS | Children's Television Workshop | | Various animated segments |
| The Tracey Ullman Show | 81 | 1987–1990 | Fox | Gracie Films | | The Simpsons shorts and Dr. N!Godatu |
| The Weird Al Show | 13 | 1997 | CBS | Dick Clark Productions | | Various animated segments |

== Upcoming ==
| Title | Release date | Original channel | American company | Note | Technique |
|---|---|---|---|---|---|
| Avengers: Mightiest Friends | 2027 | Disney Junior | Disney Television Animation | | CGI |
| Cars: Lightning Racers | 2027 | Disney Junior | Disney Television Animation | | CGI |
| Garfield | December 11, 2026 | Paramount+ | Nickelodeon Animation Studio | | Traditional |
| Stewie | 2027 | Fox | 20th Television Animation | | Flash |
| The Sunnyridge 3 | 2027 | Disney+ | Disney Television Animation | | Flash |
| Ted: The Animated Series | December 17, 2026 | Peacock | TBA | | Traditional |
| Wacky Wednesday | TBA | Netflix | Netflix Animation | | Mixed Media |

== Pilots ==
| Title | Release date | Original channel | American company | Note | Technique |
|---|---|---|---|---|---|
| AJ's Infinite Summer | May 16, 2014 | Cartoon Network | Cartoon Network Studios | | Traditional |
| Battletoads | 1992 | Syndication | DIC Entertainment | | Traditional |
| Cheyenne Cinnamon and the Fantabulous Unicorn of Sugar Town Candy Fudge | March 29, 2010 | Adult Swim | Williams Street | | Traditional |
| The Groovenians | November 10, 2002 | Adult Swim | Cartoon Network Studios | | CGI |
| A Kitty Bobo Show | August 17, 2001 | Cartoon Network | Cartoon Network Studios | | Traditional |
| Korgoth of Barbaria | June 3, 2006 | Adult Swim | Williams Street | | Traditional |
| Neon Knome | 2008 | Adult Swim | Williams Street | | Flash |
| Plastic Man | 2006 | Cartoon Network | Warner Bros. Animation | | Traditional |
| Snake 'n' Bacon | May 10, 2009 | Adult Swim | Williams Street | | Flash |
| Wacky Races Forever | 2006 | Cartoon Network | Warner Bros. Animation | | Flash |
| Welcome to Eltingville | March 3, 2002 | Adult Swim | Cartoon Network Studios | | Traditional |

== Unaired shows in the United States ==
| Title | Episodes | Year | Original channel | American company | Note | Technique |
|---|---|---|---|---|---|---|
| The Adventures of Napkin Man! | 60 | 2013–2017 | —N/a | Little Airplane Productions | Canadian co-production | Flash/Live-Action |
| Boy Girl Dog Cat Mouse Cheese | 156 | 2019–2024 | —N/a | Cloudco Entertainment | French-Irish co-production | Flash |
| Buffy: The Animated Series | 6 | 2002 | Fox Kids | 20th Century Fox | | Traditional |
| The Cartoonstitute | 39 | 2010 | Cartoon Network | Cartoon Network Studios | | Traditional/Flash |
| Dan Dare: Pilot of the Future | 26 | 2001–2002 | —N/a | Netter Digital | British co-production | CGI |
| Deadpool | 10 | 2018 | FXX | Marvel Television | | Traditional |
| Fat Dog Mendoza | 26 | 2001–2002 | —N/a | Sunbow Entertainment | British-German co-production | Traditional |
| Finley the Fire Engine | 78 | 2007–2012 | —N/a | RHI Entertainment; Kickstart Productions | British co-production | CGI |
| Full English | 5 | 2012 | Channel 4 | Rough Draft Studios | British co-production | Traditional |
| Garbage Pail Kids | 13 | 1987 | CBS | The Topps Company | Unaired due to controversial themes. | Traditional |
| Garfield Originals | 24 | 2019–2020 | | Paws, Inc. | French co-production | Traditional |
| Horrible Histories | 26 | 2001–2002 | —N/a | Mike Young Productions | British-Irish co-production | Traditional |
| The Skinner Boys: Guardians of the Lost Secrets | 26 | 2014 | —N/a | Home Plate Entertainment | Australian co-production (season 1) | Traditional |
| Star Wars: Detours | 39 | 2013 | —N/a | Lucasfilm | | CGI |
| The Wrong Coast | 13 | 2003–2004 | —N/a | Curious Pictures | Canadian co-production | Stop-Motion |
| YooHoo & Friends | 26 | 2012 | —N/a | Toonzone Studios | | Flash |

== See also ==
- List of animated television series by episode count
- List of theatrical animated short film series
