= Larz Bourne =

American cartoonist

Larz Bourne (February 8, 1916 – March 14, 1993) was an American cartoon writer, animator, storyboard artist, and comic artist for Famous Studios, Hanna-Barbera, DePatie-Freleng Enterprises, and Terrytoons.

== Career ==
Bourne started his career in 1937 after graduating from Chicago Professional School of Cartooning. He was the creator of Spooky the Tuff Little Ghost and Deputy Dawg. He died in 1993 at the age of 77.

== Work ==
- Popeye the Sailor - Writer (Famous Studios shorts)
- Noveltoons - Writer
- Screen Songs - Writer (Famous Studios shorts)
- Jingle Jangle Comics - Artist
- Kartunes - Writer
- Casper the Friendly Ghost - Writer
- Herman and Katnip - Writer
- Little Dot - Writer
- Tom Terrific - Animation director
- Hector Heathcote - Writer
- Deputy Dawg - Creator, Writer
- The Astronut Show - Creator, Writer
- The Adventures of Lariat Sam - Storyboard artist
- Tom and Jerry - Writer (Gene Deitch shorts)
- Wacky Races - Writer
- Cattanooga Cats - Writer
- Dastardly and Muttley in Their Flying Machines - Writer
- Scooby-Doo, Where Are You! - Writer (Season 2)
- Josie and the Pussycats - Writer
- The Pebbles and Bamm-Bamm Show - Writer
- The Pink Panther Show - Writer
- The Funky Phantom - Writer
- Josie and the Pussycats in Outer Space - Writer
- The New Scooby-Doo Movies - Writer (Season 2)
- Bailey's Comets - Writer
- Speed Buggy - Writer, Storyboard artist
- Wheelie and the Chopper Bunch - Writer
- Hong Kong Phooey - Writer
- Jabberjaw - Writer
- The Scooby-Doo Show - Writer
- Laff-A-Lympics - Writer
- Captain Caveman and the Teen Angels - Writer
- CB Bears - Associate story editor
- The All New Popeye Hour - Developer, Story editor (Seasons 1–3)
- The New Fred and Barney Show - Story editor
- Casper's Halloween Special - Writer
- Drak Pack - Writer, Story editor
- The Kwicky Koala Show - Writer, Story editor
