= Dingbat Land =

- Directed by: Connie Rasinski
- Story by: John Foster
- Produced by: Paul Terry
- Starring: Tom Morrison (uncredited)
- Music by: Philip A. Scheib
- Animation by: John Foster; Connie Rasinski; Reuben Timmins; Jim Tyer; Carlo Vinci (all uncredited)
- Layouts by: Art Bartsch (uncredited)
- Backgrounds by: Anderson Craig; Bill Hilliker (both uncredited)
- Color process: Technicolor
- Production company: Terrytoons
- Distributed by: 20th Century Fox
- Release date: February 1, 1949
- Running time: 6:29
- Language: English

Dingbat Land is a 1949 short animated film produced by Terrytoons and distributed by 20th Century Fox starring Gandy Goose and Sourpuss.

== Plot ==
Gandy Goose and Sourpuss go on a safari jungle hunt in search for a rare Dingbat bird.

== Production ==
This is the second short to feature Dingbat, a yellow canary wearing a sailor hat who has a maniacal laughter. The character was introduced in Hard Boiled Egg (1948). Paul Terry was inspired by the Looney Tunes character Tweety, and hoped that Dingbat would become a recurring character. The series lasted for three more cartoons, with All This and Rabbit Stew, Foiling The Fox and Sour Grapes (all released in 1950). Dingbat would occasionally be paired up with Sylvester the Fox.
