= Gypsy Life =

1945 film by Connie Rasinski

- Directed by: Connie Rasinski
- Story by: John Foster
- Produced by: Paul Terry
- Starring: Roy Halee; Betty Jaynes (both uncredited)
- Music by: Philip A. Scheib
- Animation by: Carlo Vinci; Connie Rasinski (both uncredited)
- Color process: Technicolor
- Production company: Terrytoons
- Distributed by: 20th Century Fox
- Release date: August 3, 1945
- Running time: 7 min (one reel)
- Language: English

Gypsy Life is a 1945 American animated short film directed by Connie Rasinski. It is part of the Mighty Mouse series. It is notable for being nominated for an Oscar in the 18th Academy Awards, a rarity in Terrytoons' history due to the studio's middling output.

== Summary ==
A caravan of gypsy mice travel through the countryside in horse-drawn wagons, singing about their carefree and "ever gay" lifestyle. As evening falls, they set up camp and gather to watch a beautiful female dancer perform a high-energy routine to a violin accompaniment.

Unbeknownst to the mice, they are being stalked by a colony of "cat-bats"—predatory, vampire-like creatures with the wings of bats and the heads of cats—who watch from a nearby mountain cave. The leader of the cat-bats rallies his group, and they launch a coordinated aerial assault on the camp. The cat-bats terrorize the mice, capturing several and causing the caravan to flee in panic.

The female dancer is cornered by the cat-bat leader, but she defiantly sings that help is on the way. Hearing their pleas, Mighty Mouse flies to the scene and engages the cat-bats in a series of mid-air dogfights. He uses his super-strength to punch and collide with the villains, eventually driving the colony back into their cave.

During the chaos, the dancer falls from a cliff and is suspended precariously over a crocodile-infested pond. Mighty Mouse swoops down at the last second, rescuing her from the snapping jaws of the crocodiles. With the threat defeated, the mice celebrate their hero, and the dancer rewards Mighty Mouse with a kiss.

== Accolades ==
This is the only Mighty Mouse cartoon that was nominated for an Oscar even though it lost to a Tom and Jerry cartoon called Quiet Please!, also released in 1945.

== See also ==
- 1945 in film
- Operetta
