= Mad Mad Mad Monsters =

- Official logo
- Written by: William J. Keenan; Lou Silverstone
- Directed by: Arthur Rankin Jr. Jules Bass
- Starring: Allen Swift; Bob McFadden; Bradley Bolke; Rhoda Mann
- Theme music composer: Maury Laws
- Countries of origin: United States; Japan
- Original language: English

Production
- Producers: Arthur Rankin Jr. Jules Bass
- Cinematography: Steve Nakagawa
- Editor: Irwin Goldress
- Running time: 43 minutes
- Production companies: Rankin/Bass Productions; Animation: Mushi Production

Original release
- Network: ABC
- Release: September 23, 1972

Mad Mad Mad Monsters is a 1972 traditional animated Halloween-themed comedy television special produced by Rankin/Bass Productions in the United States and animated overseas by Mushi Production in Japan. The special aired on September 23, 1972, as an episode of The ABC Saturday Superstar Movie. It is "related" to the 1967 stop motion animated film Mad Monster Party?

== Plot ==
After Baron Henry von Frankenstein creates a Bride for his Monster, he decides to make arrangements for a lavish wedding at the Transylvania Astoria Hotel. Henry's assistant Igor is jealous of the Monster and wants the Bride for his own, much to the annoyance of Henry.

Arriving at the hotel, Henry gets the wedding booked on Friday the 13th while having the hotel manager Harold write down the required foods. He does turn down the flaming shish-kebabs idea since some of the guests are allergic to fire. Another thing Henry asks is for him to watch his pet vulture Rosebud and make sure he stays in his cage during the event since he does not want him bothering his guests.

Many monsters are invited to the wedding including Count Dracula, his son Boobula and Boobula's pet black cat, Ron Chanley the Werewolf, the Mummy, the Creature, Claude the Invisible Man, his invisible wife Nagatha, his invisible son Ghoul, and Ghoul's invisible dog Goblin when Harold's mailman brother Harvey delivers the invites.

Following his visit to a therapist, Harvey is asked by Harold to watch over the hotel while he takes a vacation. Once the wedding guests arrive, they terrify the guests and staff as the bellhop Norman gets the autographs of the monsters (since he believes them to be movie stars). Norman even talks to Count Dracula and Claude about a rumor that the Wicked Witch of the East will emerge from the cake at midnight during the bachelor party. Henry arrives to see that the Transylvania Astoria is as he likes it. He also reminds Harvey to keep an eye on Rosebud and make sure he stays in his cage.

When the bachelor party occurs, Count Dracula and Claude talk about the Monster's various moments in the past while Nagatha advises them not to embarrass the Monster. When the Bride is shown, the monsters are fascinated and start fighting each other (all except Claude and Nagatha who continue eating their dinner) and the two pets chase each other. As midnight happens, the Wicked Witch of the East does indeed emerge from the cake.

Igor begins to steal the Bride the next day when instructed to hide her until the wedding which does not go at all according to plan when the Bride ends up snatched up by a pterosaur and lands in the clutches of a giant gorilla named Modzoola.

Running back to the Transylvania Astoria, Igor uses charades to inform Henry what happened. While Harvey stays behind, Henry leads the monsters and Norman to rescue the Bride. When they catch up to Modzoola, they work to rescue the Bride. Just then, Modzoola's wife Mrs. Zoola shows up and Modzoola releases the Bride as Mrs. Zoola drags him off to deal with him.

When the wedding approaches, the Monster is nervous until Henry and Norman help him get over it and have his suit specially made. Due to the priest not showing up, Harvey is enlisted to wed them. When the monsters kiss as the Bride's face is shown, they release massive electrical energy that destroys the Transylvania Astoria.

Sometime later, Harvey visits the therapist again who tells him that monsters are not real. The therapist turns out to be Dr. Jekyll. When he drinks his elixir, Dr. Jekyll becomes Mr. Hyde and chases Harvey.

As the credits roll, the Creature, Count Dracula, Ron Chanley's werewolf form, the Mummy, Boobula, Claude and Ghoul, the Monster, his Bride, and their newborn child all join Mr. Hyde in chasing Harvey. Norman runs after them in order to get Mr. Hyde's autograph which will complete his collection of the monsters' autographs.

== Cast ==
- Bob McFadden as Baron Henry von Frankenstein, and Harvey
- Allen Swift as Count Dracula, Igor, the Monster, Claude the Invisible Man, Ron Chanley the Werewolf, Dr. Jekyll and Mr. Hyde, Rosebud the vulture, Harold, Post Office Boss
- Bradley Bolke as Norman the bellhop, Additional Voices
- Rhoda Mann as the Bride, Nagatha the Invisible Woman, Wicked Witch of the East, Ghoul the Invisible Boy, Boobula

== Credits ==
- Produced and directed by: Arthur Rankin Jr. and Jules Bass
- Written by: William J. Keenan and Lou Silverstone
- Associate producer: Basil Cox
- Animation production by: Mushi Production
  - Animation supervision: Steve Nakagawa
  - Key animation and layout by: Yoshikazu Yasuhiko (uncredited)
- Sound engineers: David Scott and Robert Elder
- Editorial supervisor: Irwin Goldress
- Music: Maury Laws

== Reception ==
The special was called "visually stunning" but, because of the poor storyline, a "disappointing outing".
