= Carmen's Veranda =

- Directed by: Mannie Davis
- Story by: John Foster
- Produced by: Paul Terry
- Music by: Philip A. Scheib
- Color process: Technicolor
- Production company: Terrytoons
- Distributed by: 20th Century Fox
- Release date: July 28, 1944
- Running time: 6:25
- Language: English

Carmen's Veranda is a 1944 short animated musical film produced by Terrytoons and distributed by 20th Century Fox. The film is one of the studio's early films in color.

== Plot ==
An opera is taking place at a theatre. The opera centers on Carmen, a white cat in a racy red dress and racy red high heels.

In the opera, Carmen's mother, a pink hippo, urges Carmen to marry the count, a generous and wealthy but unattractive nobleman. Carmen, however, does not adore the count, and will therefore only marry whom she has affection for.

The count comes to Carmen's place with various gifts (a reference to wartime rationing). But Carmen remains strong to her marital preference. Every time the count approaches the cat at her balcony, Carmen either bashes him back down or drops a heavy object. Carmen's mother then resorts to sending armored guards to Carmen's room, in an attempt to push Carmen to take the count. Carmen locks her room and writes a distress letter to someone named Tyrone. Carmen sends the message via bird.

In another scene in the opera, Tyrone, who is played by Gandy Goose, receives the message carried by the bird. He then sets off in a flying horse to the William Tell Overture.

Tyrone arrives just outside Carmen's home. The guards charge at him but Tyrone is able to overcome them. Eventually, with his flying horse, Tyrone comes to the elevated window of Carmen's room where he picks up Carmen before flying away. The count, however, isn't left loveless as he finds a lover in Carmen's mother.
