= 271 North Avenue =

Building in New Rochelle, New York, United States

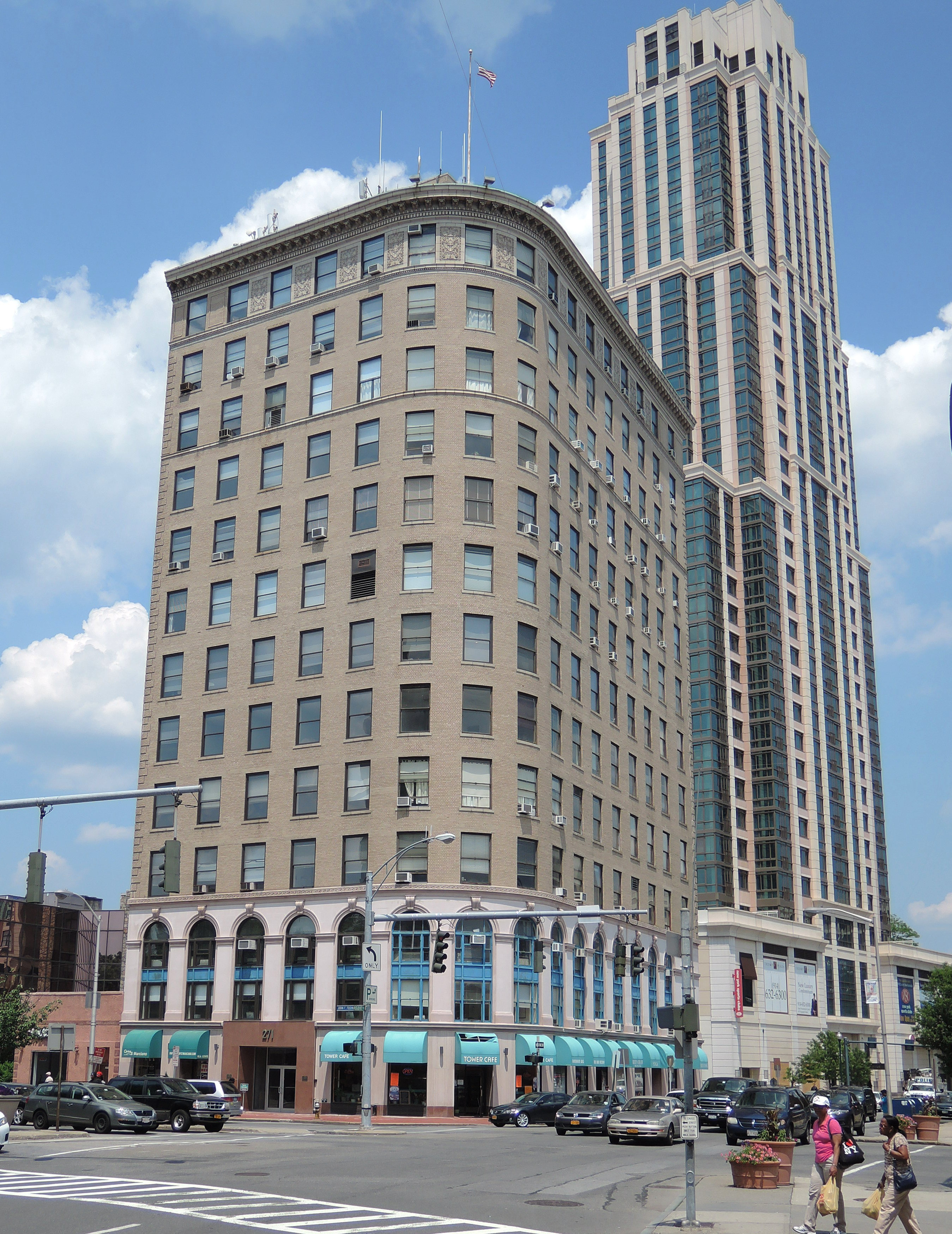
- Interactive map of the 271 North Avenue area

General information
- Status: Completed
- Location: 271 North Avenue, New Rochelle, New York 10801
- Coordinates: 40°54′42.8″N 73°46′56.3″W
- Completed: 1930
- Cost: $1,000,000

Height
- Roof: 247.0 feet (75.29 m)

Technical details
- Floor count: 13

Design and construction
- Architects: Schwartz & Gross
- Main contractor: Harry Schiff & Sons

271 North Avenue (also known as the Schiff Building, Pershing Square, the Kaufman or K Building) is a 13-story art-deco office tower located in the downtown section of New Rochelle in Westchester County, New York.

== Overview ==
The brick, limestone and terra-cotta structure was designed by the architectural firm Schwartz & Gross and constructed by Harry Schiff & Sons. It was completed in 1930 at a cost of $1 million.

The building is built-up following the principles which guided early skyscraper design.

Overall, the building's use of massing is derived from the sections used in all classic columnar orders, consisting of a base, shaft and capital.

The 3-story retail storefront space serves as the base, upon which are 10 stories, serving as the shaft, and, above this, is the cornice, representing the capital. The lower floors include commercial storefronts on the first story with a round-arched arcade on the second and third. The upper facade is designed with flat topped windows with minor detailing in the brick surrounds. In 1936 an additional floor was added to the building. The cornice is of terra cotta and includes medallions and dentils.

This was the tallest building in Westchester County when it was built in the 1920s. It was originally called the "Pershing Square Building", derived from its location on Pershing Square at the intersection of North Avenue and Huguenot Street. The building is located on the site of the former "Besley's Tavern", a Revolutionary War-era establishment where town meetings were held in 1773–1776. George Washington had once lodged at the tavern on a trip through New Rochelle. The building was developed, built and owned by Harry Schiff & Son, prominent New York developers who erected and owned numerous buildings in New Rochelle and New York City. It was later renamed "Kaufman" by a later landlord, the owner of Kaufman Studios in Queens, New York. Paul Terry established his animation company Terrytoons here in 1934. The firm created such well known characters as Mighty Mouse and Heckle & Jeckle, in the building until 1949 when it relocated to a nearby downtown location at 38 Centre Avenue. WVOX-AM 1460 maintained studios and offices here for decades.
