= The Astronut Show =

1965 animated television series

The Astronut Show is an animated TV series, produced by the Terrytoons animation studio. It first aired on August 23, 1965. In the late 1960s, each episode included Astronut, Hashimoto-san, and Luno the White Stallion. In the early 1970s, the episodes were reprogrammed; these episodes included Astronut, Sad Cat and James Hound.

== Main character ==
Astronut first appeared on the Deputy Dawg series. He is a squat, childlike, short, friendly green alien in a tiny flying saucer who frequently gets into mischief on Earth. He has a human friend called Oscar Mild, who was, as his name suggested, a soft-spoken character. Oscar works in an office for Mr. Nicely, whose temperament is the exact opposite of his name.

== Production ==
The series was directed by Art Bartsch, Bob Kuwahara, Connie Rasinski, and David Tendlar. The writers were Larz Bourne, Glan Heish, Tom Morrison, and Bob Ogle. Voices were provided by Dayton Allen and Bob McFadden.

The Astronut cartoons were originally produced by Terrytoons for theatrical distribution by 20th Century Fox from 1964 to 1966. Starting in 1966, the cartoons were solely made for television. In 1989, Video Treasures released three VHS tapes; two included all of the theatrical cartoons and the third had some of the made-for-TV cartoons.

== Astronut theatrical cartoons ==
1964

- Brother from Outer Space
- Oscar's Moving Day
- Kisser Plant
- Outer Galaxy Gazette
- Molecular Mixup
- Hokey Home Movies

1965

- Sky's the Limit, The
- Weather Magic
- Robots in Toyland
- Twinkle Twinkle Little Telstar

1966

- Gems for Gemini
- Haunted Housekeeping

== Astronut TV cartoons ==
1966

- Oscar's Birthday Present
- Jolly Jupiter
- No Space Like Home
- Martian Recipe
- Martian Moochers
- Oscar's Thinking Cap
- The Invisibeam
