= Luno the White Stallion =

Terrytoons cartoon character

Luno the White Stallion is a Terrytoons cartoon character (1963 to 1965). The series of cartoons centered on a little boy, Tim, who had a toy horse of marble white, Luno. Luno would come alive and whisk him off on adventures in far off lands when Tim said the words, "Oh winged horse of marble white, take me on a magic flight". The series was produced by William Weiss, and directed by Connie Rasinski and Arthur Bartsch.

Six Luno shorts were released theatrically; eleven further shorts aired as backup segments in the Terrytoons television shows The Astronut Show and Deputy Dawg. Five of the shorts produced for The Astronut Show were later released theatrically in the mid-1970s.

== Cast ==
- Bob McFadden - Luno the White Stallion
- Norma MacMillan and Dayton Allen - Tim

== Episodes ==
Theatrical releases:

- The Missing Genie (Apr 1963)
- Trouble in Baghdad (June 1963)
- Roc-A-Bye Sinbad (Jan 1964)
- King Rounder (April 1964)
- Adventure By the Sea (July 1964)
- The Gold Dust Bandit (Oct 1964)

Episodes produced for The Astronut Show:

- The Poor Pirate
- Island of the Giants
- The Flying Chariot
- Mixed Up Matador
- Melvin the Magnificent
- King Neptune's Castle
- The Square Planet
- The Prehysteric Inventor
- Who's Dragon
- Jungle Jack
- 1772
