= White Stallion =

White Stallion may refer to:

- An alternative title for Harmony Trail
- Lightning, the White Stallion, 1986 American drama film
- Luno the White Stallion, a Terrytoons cartoon character
- The White Stallion, a 1982 children's book by Elizabeth Shub
