= Hashimoto-san =

Terrytoons animated television character

Hashimoto-san is a fictional Japanese mouse created by Japanese-born animator Bob Kuwahara and Eli Bauer for the Terrytoons animation company. Hashimoto is a jujutsu instructor living in Japan with his wife Hanako, son Saburo, and daughter Yuriko.

The first cartoon in the series, "Hashimoto-san", was a seven-minute short released theatrically on September 6, 1959. Fourteen cartoons were produced, ending with "Spooky-Yaki", which was released on November 13, 1963.

Hashimoto is an expert in jujutsu and the ninja arts, but never used his skills to harm anyone. He also frequently told stories about Japan to an American reporter named G.I. Joe a.k.a. Joey or Joey-san.

Hashimoto and the other characters in the series were voiced by John Myhers. All of the shorts were directed by Kuwahara, who had an intimate knowledge of Japanese culture through his own family ties.

Between 1963 and 1965, the shorts were incorporated into The Hector Heathcote Show as part of NBC's Saturday morning cartoon lineup. During the mid-1960s, Hashimoto had his own board game and also appeared in a handful of comic books published by Gold Key Comics, always with other Terrytoon characters such as Deputy Dawg or Hector Heathcote.

Some episodes contained scenes whose artwork reflected Japan's traditional ukiyo-e woodblock prints.

Neil Young often had Hashimoto cartoons playing in the auditoriums where he was performing in concert to entertain the crowd before the show and during intermissions.

== Filmography ==
Fourteen cartoons were produced between 1959 and 1963, directed by Bob Kuwahara, Dave Tendlar, Connie Rasinski, Mannie Davis, and Art Bartsch.

- "Hashimoto-San" (Sept. 6, 1959) - Kuwahara and Tendlar
- "House of Hashimoto" (Nov. 30, 1960) - Rasinski
- "Night Life in Tokyo" (Feb. 1961) - Davis
- "So Sorry, Pussycat" (March 1961) - Bartsch
- "Son of Hashimoto" (April 12, 1961) - Rasinski
- "Strange Companion" (May 12, 1961) - Davis
- "Honorable Cat Story" (Nov. 1961) - Rasinski
- "Honorable Family Problem" (March 30, 1962) - Kuwahara
- "Loyal Royalty" (May 18, 1962) - Kuwahara
- "Honorable Pain in the Neck" (Aug. 22, 1962) - Kuwahara
- Tea House Mouse (Jan. 1963) - Kuwahara
- "Pearl Crazy" (May 1963) - Kuwahara
- "Cherry Blossom Festival" (June 17, 1963) - Kuwahara
- "Spooky-Yaki" (Nov 13, 1963) - Kuwahara
