= Dayton Allen =

American comedian and voice actor

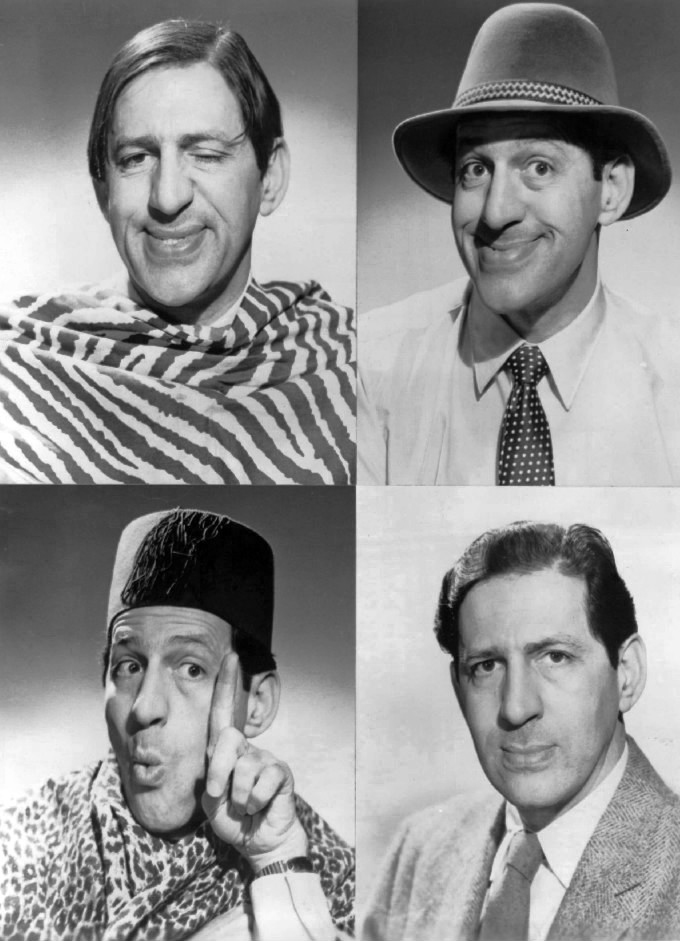
- Allen as some of the characters he performed on The Steve Allen Show, and also as himself, 1959.
- Born: Dayton Allen Bolke; September 24, 1919; New York City, U.S.
- Died: November 11, 2004 (aged 85); Hendersonville, North Carolina, U.S.
- Occupations: Comedian, voice actor
- Years active: 1937–1985
- Spouse: Elvi Allen (m. 1958)
- Relatives: Bradley Bolke (brother)

Dayton Allen (born Dayton Allen Bolke; September 24, 1919 – November 11, 2004) was an American comedian and voice actor. He was one of the "men in the street" on The Steve Allen Show. His catchphrase was "Why not, Bubbe?" (pronounced "whooooyyy not!")

== Early life ==
Allen was born in New York City, the son of Helen and Sol Bolke, a dress manufacturer. His younger brother, Bradley Bolke, had some limited success as a voice actor, often appearing in supporting roles alongside Allen. He grew up in Mount Vernon, New York, where he graduated from A.B. Davis High School in June 1936. One of his school friends was Art Carney.

== Career ==
Allen, like Carney, began his career in radio. In 1937–1938 WINS (AM) hired him as a disc jockey.

He was the voice of various New York-based children's television show characters, appearing on Winky Dink and You as Mr. Bungle for five years, and playing Phineas T. Bluster, Flub-a-Dub, and various other puppet characters on Howdy Doody (as well as several "live" characters, including Ugly Sam and Pierre the Chef) for four years. Dayton was also the voice of Deputy Dawg, Heckle and Jeckle, Luno, and many early 1960s Terrytoons cartoon characters. Allen also provided the voice of the title character on Lancelot Link, Secret Chimp. He continued to be a voiceover performer through the 1990s.

He was best known as the "Why Not?" man when he joined the cast of the NBC Sunday night variety show that Allen began hosting to compete against Ed Sullivan on CBS. The catchphrase began as a stalling ad-lib to an interview question, then it caught on. Allen used it for television commercials and saw novelty toys, a book, and a record spin-off from the "Why not?" phenomenon. In its day, fans were shouting "Why not?" as often as Mad Magazine's famous "What? Me Worry?" A classic example of Allen's humor comes from an August 1968 appearance on The Steve Allen Show, syndicated nationally in the US by Filmways: "Did you know your mind alone can make you smart?" Why Not was also an album he recorded in 1960, that peaked at No. 35 on the Billboard Top LPs, in a week stay on the chart.

His brother, Bradley Bolke, was also a voice actor, best known as the voice of Chumley (Tennessee Tuxedo's walrus sidekick) on Tennessee Tuxedo and His Tales, and the syndicated version of The Underdog Show.

Allen's talents as a mimic were showcased in October 1963 when he appeared alongside Groucho Marx on the CBS-TV game show I've Got a Secret. The show’s panelists had been blindfolded, and all their questions to Groucho were answered instead by Allen doing an accurate Groucho impersonation. Finally, with panelists Bess Myerson, Betsy Palmer, Henry Morgan, and Bill Cullen all stumped, the secret was revealed.

After his show business career ended, Allen was a real estate agent, operating out of an office in Dobbs Ferry, New York.

== Death ==
Allen died on November 11, 2004, in Hendersonville, North Carolina, due to complications from a stroke.

== Filmography ==
=== Film & TV ===
| Year | Title | Character |
|---|---|---|
| 1945 | Bad Bill Bunion | TV Announcer (voice) |
| 1945 | The Exterminator | Radio Announcer, Narrator (voice) |
| 1946 | The Tortoise Wins Again | Papa Hare, Papa Tortoise, Pig (voice) |
| 1946 | The Uninvited Pests | Heckle, Jeckle, Dimwit (voice) (uncredited) |
| 1947 | Howdy Doody | Phineas T. Bluster (1 episode) |
| 1948 | Felix the Fox | Dimwit, Felix the Fox (voice) |
| 1948 | Magpie Madness | Heckle, Jeckle, Dimwit, Doctor (voice) |
| 1948 | Goony Golfers | Heckle, Jeckle, Bulldog Golfer (voice) (uncredited) |
| 1948 | The Racket Buster | Narrator, Edward G. Robincat (voice) |
| 1949 | Mrs. Jones' Rest Farm | Mrs. Jones (voice) |
| 1951 | The Helpful Geni | Geni (voice) (uncredited) |
| 1951 | The Cat's Tale | Cat (voice) |
| 1956 | The Steve Allen Show | Self (4 episodes) |
| 1958 | Grateful Gus | Grateful Gus (uncredited) |
| 1960 | Courageous Cat and Minute Mouse | (124 episodes) |
| 1960 | Deputy Dawg | All Voices |
| 1960 | Galaxia | Matchmaker (uncredited) (voice) |
| 1961 | Tree Spree | Stanley, Cleo the Giraffe |
| 1962 | Funderful Suburbia | Hardy, Pay Toll Man (voice) |
| 1962 | Send Your Elephant to Camp | Sidney the Elephant (voice) |
| 1962 | The Merv Griffin Show | Self (2 episodes) |
| 1962 | The Old Man and the Flower | Narrator |
| 1963 | Sidney's White Elephant | Sidney (voice) |
| 1963 | Obnoxious Obie | Deputy Dawg |
| 1963 | Split-Level Treehouse | Sidney (voice) |
| 1964 | Oscar's Moving Day | Astronut (voice) |
| 1964 | Short Term Sheriff | Duckwood |
| 1964 | Oil Thru the Day | Duckwood |
| 1964 | Search for Misery | Roland Stone |
| 1964 | The Red Tractor | Duckwood |
| 1964 | The Astronut Show | Luno (16 episodes) |
| 1964 | Hokey Home Movies | Astronut, Oscar (voice) |
| 1964 | The Munsters | (1 episode) |
| 1965 | No Space Like Home | Astronut (voice) |
| 1965 | The Invisibeam | Astronut (voice) |
| 1965 | Twinkle Twinkle Little Telestar | Astronut, Oscar (voice) |
| 1966 | The Monster Master | James Hound (voice) |
| 1966 | Gems from Gemini | Astronut (voice) |
| 1966 | The Phantom Skyscraper | James Hound (voice) |
| 1966 | Dr. Ha-Ha | James Hound (voice) |
| 1967 | A Voodoo Spell | James Hound (voice) |
| 1967 | The Heat's Off | James Hound (voice) |
| 1967 | Mr. Winlucky | James Hound (voice) |
| 1967 | Give Me Liberty | James Hound (voice) |
| 1967 | Bugged by a Bug | James Hound (voice) |
| 1967 | Which Is Witch? | James Hound (voice) |
| 1967 | Dr. Rhinestone's Theory | James Hound (voice) |
| 1967 | Marvin Digs | Marvin, George (voice) |
| 1967 | Frozen Sparklers | James Hound (voice) |
| 1967 | Baron Von Go-Go | James Hound (voice) |
| 1969 | Space Pet | Astronut (voice) |
| 1971 | Oscar's Thinking Cap | Astronaut, Oscar (voice) |
| 1984 | The Cotton Club | Solly |
