= Dinky Duck =

Terrytoons animated film character

- Terrytoons character
- First appearance: The Orphan Duck (1939)
- Created by: Paul Terry
- Voiced by: Tom Morrison (1952–1953); Allen Swift (1957); Dee Bradley Baker (1999)

In-universe information
- Species: Duck
- Gender: Male

Dinky Duck is a Terrytoons cartoon character who first appeared in the 1939 animated short The Orphan Duck. Unlike fellow Terrytoons characters Mighty Mouse, silly Gandy Goose and the magpie duo Heckle and Jeckle, Dinky never became popular, appearing in a total of only 15 cartoons between 1939 and 1957.

For most of his appearances, Dinky is a young black duck who lived on a farm with ducks, chickens and other typical farm animals. Sometimes he was an orphan who simply wanted a place to call home; on other occasions, he would perform some heroic deed and help restore calm to the barnyard when adult animals quarreled.

The early Dinky Duck cartoons presents Dinky making a sharp quacking noise, while the later shorts gave a young voice to Dinky, performed by Tom Morrison. Several of the cartoons had a singing chorus that gave an introduction to the upcoming story.

Dinky's final appearance was in It's a Living, a CinemaScope cartoon. Here, he was voiced by actor Allen Swift. In the short, he sheds his cute farmyard duck persona and instead takes on the role of a disgruntled animation actor who quits his cartoon character job to try his hand in television commercial acting.

Dinky was going to have a cameo in the 1988 film Who Framed Roger Rabbit, but rights to the character could not be obtained in time.

Dinky appears as a supporting character in the 1999 pilot Curbside. Here, he was voiced by Dee Bradley Baker.

== Filmography ==
=== List of shorts ===
- The Orphan Duck (October 6, 1939)
- Much Ado About Nothing (March 22, 1940)
- The Lucky Duck (September 6, 1940)
- Welcome Little Stranger (October 3, 1941)
- Life with Fido (August 21, 1942)
- Dinky Finds a Home (June 7, 1946)
- The Beauty Shop (April 28, 1950)
- Flat Foot Fledgling (January 25, 1952)
- The Foolish Duckling (May 16, 1952)
- Sink or Swim (August 29, 1952)
- Featherweight Champ (February 6, 1953)
- Wise Quacks (February 27, 1953)
- The Orphan Egg (April 24, 1953)
- The Timid Scarecrow (August 28, 1953)
- It's a Living (November 15, 1957)
