= Hector Heathcote =

Fictional animated Terrytoons character

- Terrytoons character
- First appearance: The Minute and a Half Man (July 18, 1959)
- Created by: Eli Bauer and Ralph Bakshi
- Voiced by: John Myhers

Hector Heathcote is a Terrytoons animated cartoon character. Created by Eli Bauer and Ralph Bakshi, he first appeared on July 4, 1959, in The Minute and a Half Man. He was voiced by John Myhers. Terrytoons created the character for television, but the cartoons also received theatrical distribution.

Hector is an 18-year-old orange-haired Colonial era patriot who turned up, often as an unsung hero, during various stages of American history. In later cartoons he was accompanied by his faithful red-and-yellow dog Winston who talked with a slight English accent. Heathcote was also antagonized by a big bully named Benedict, who parodied the infamous American traitor Benedict Arnold.

While much of the cartoons were historical, occasionally some would focus on science, one example being where Hector talks through two tin cans and a piece of string, then is inspired by Winston to make use of electrical currents to upgrade such a device to travel long distances, thus inventing telecommunications. In the same episode, Hector is also a messenger boy in the employ of Mr. Benedict. Hector is motivated to find a way to communicate long distances after not desiring to deliver messages through "rain, sleet, nor gloom of night". Conversely, Mr. Benedict attempts to sabotage the concept before Hector can patent it, as that would put his messenger service out of business.

The Hector Heathcote Show aired on NBC Saturday mornings from October 5, 1963, to September 25, 1965, and is one of the early Saturday morning cartoons. The series ran for two seasons, replacing The Shari Lewis Show. Additional cartoons in the program included Hashimoto-san, a Japanese mouse, and Silly Sidney the Elephant, a wacky pachyderm whose friends included Cleo the giraffe and Stanley, a cantankerous lion. The show would end with a scene of Hector going to bed.

Hector is merchandised on lunch boxes, books and toys. Gold Key Comics published him in comic book form, but only produced one issue in 1964.

== Filmography ==
Terrytoons made 35 Hector Heathcote cartoons between 1959 and 1974, directed by Arthur Bartsch, Dave Tendlar, Connie Rasinski, Bill Tytla and Bob Kuwahara.

- The Minute and a Half Man (July 4, 1959)
- The Famous Ride (April 1960)
- Daniel Boone, Jr. (Dec 8, 1960)
- Drum Roll (March 31, 1961)
- Railroaded to Fame (May 7, 1961)
- The First Fast Mail (May 19, 1961)
- Crossing the Delaware (June 9, 1961)
- Unsung Hero (July 21, 1961)
- Klondike Strikes Out (Jan 1962)
- He-Man Seaman (March 1962)
- Riverboat Mission (May 20, 1962)
- First Flight Up (Oct 30, 1962)
- A Flight to the Finish (Jan 1963)
- Tea Party (April 1963)
- A Bell for Philadelphia (July 1963)
- Vally Forge Hero (August 28, 1963)
- The Big Clean-Up (Sept 1963)
- Foxed by a Fox (Sept 1963)
- Expert Explorer (November 6, 1963)
- Hold the Fort (January 4, 1964)
- Search for a Symbol (January 18, 1964)
- The First Telephone (January 25, 1964)
- High Flyer (February 1964)
- Messy Messenger (February 29, 1964)
- Hats off to Hector (August 18, 1964)
- Land Grab (Feb 1970)
- Lost and Foundation (June 1970)
- Belabour Thy Neighbor (Oct 1970)
- Train Terrain (Feb 1971)
- Wing Bag (June 1971)
- Ice Cream for Help (October 1971)
- Barrel of Fun (June 1972)
- Peace Pipe (June 1973)
- The Hectormobile (October 1973)
- Har Har Harpoon (November 1974)
