= Fanny Zilch =

American theatrical cartoon character

Fanny Zilch is an animated cartoon character, part of the Terrytoons series. She made her debut in 1933. Her cartoons were musical spoofs of melodrama serials like The Perils of Pauline, in which blonde sweetheart Fanny -- "the Banker's Daughter"—was pursued by the villainous Oil Can Harry, and protected by the heroic J. Leffingwell Strongheart.

Terrytoons later used the melodrama spoof as a running theme in the Mighty Mouse cartoons, beginning with A Fight to the Finish in 1947. The endangered heroine was renamed Pearl Pureheart in Mighty Mouse, and Oil Can Harry became Mighty Mouse's cat archvillain.

Fanny Zilch also inspired a series of Betty Boop melodrama spoofs, beginning in 1934 with She Wronged Him Right.

== Development ==
Fanny's character design originated in the 1933 cartoon King Zilch, as a dancing girl who made romantic gestures toward the King.

Her first starring role was in 1933's The Banker's Daughter, which begins with an opening crawl: "EPISODE I: Fanny Zilch, the banker's daughter, has been captured by the bootleggers (the dirty skunks). She has had nothing to eat but fried chicken for a week... poor Gal. "Oil Can Harry" her third husband by a former marriage is the fly in the beer can. Will her lover arrive in time?" The cartoon opens with Fanny tied up in a sawmill by the sneering, silk-hatted villain. Oil Can Harry telegraphs her father with a ransom note, but her somewhat effeminate lover Strongheart rides a white horse to her rescue. When Fanny refuses to go along with Harry's plans, he sends her down a chute towards a spinning saw. Strongheart arrives and beats up the villain, saving Fanny from her dreadful fate.

In Episode II, The Oil Can Mystery, Fanny is once again in Oil Can Harry's power, with Strongheart tied to a railroad track.

Episode III, Fanny in the Lion's Den, has Harry lock Fanny up in a dungeon filled with lions, but over the course of several months, she befriends the lions, and they try to help her escape.

In Episode IV, Hypnotic Eyes, Harry has gained power over Fanny through hypnosis.

In the final episode of the 1933 series, Fanny's Wedding Day, Harry tries to interrupt Fanny and Strongheart's wedding day.

The characters were brought back in 1935 for a simpler, cheaper followup, Foiled Again. In this cartoon, Strongheart leads a gang in pursuit of Harry, who's got Fanny in yet another sawmill. This cartoon has less music and dialogue than the previous series; Harry is the only character with dialogue.

In 1937, the series was revived again as "Oil Can Harry" in The Villain Still Pursued Her with new character designs, including a dark-haired Fanny. The characters were brought back for one more cartoon in 1937's The Saw Mill Mystery.

== Reception and legacy ==
The 1933 episodes were deemed a success, with Film Daily writing a glowing review of The Banker's Daughter: "The opera idea combined with the burlesque meller makes this a real laugh number that will appeal to grown-ups with its cleverness and be received with delight by the kids. It is the first of a series of four. If the new technique catches on, it is liable to create a new slant in the animated field."

Happy with the results, Paul Terry went on to create a variety of musical and operetta cartoons over the next couple years, including Jealous Lover, Robin Hood, Gypsy Fiddler, and The Pirate Ship in 1933, and A Mad House and Holland Days in 1934.

== Filmography ==
Dates of the eight Fanny Zilch cartoons:

- The Banker's Daughter (June 25, 1933)
- The Oil Can Mystery (July 9, 1933)
- Fanny in the Lion's Den (July 23, 1933)
- Hypnotic Eyes (August 11, 1933)
- Fanny's Wedding Day (September 22, 1933)
- Foiled Again (October 14, 1935)
- The Villain Still Pursued Her (September 3, 1937)
- The Saw Mill Mystery (October 29, 1937)

== Restoration ==
Fanny's first cartoon, The Banker's Daughter, was restored by the UCLA Film and Television Archive in 2019.
