= Mighty Mouse: The New Adventures =

American animated television series (1987–1988)

- Genre: Action; Adventure; Comedy; Superhero
- Created by: Ralph Bakshi
- Developed by: Ralph Bakshi
- Directed by: Ralph Bakshi; John Kricfalusi; Kent Butterworth
- Starring: Patrick Pinney; Maggie Roswell; Dana Hill; Charlie Adler; Michael Pataki
- Country of origin: United States
- No. of seasons: 2
- No. of episodes: 19 (38 segments)

Production
- Executive producers: John W. Hyde (season 1); Tom Klein (season 2)
- Producer: Ralph Bakshi
- Running time: 24 minutes
- Production companies: Bakshi Animation; Bakshi-Hyde Ventures; Viacom Productions; Terrytoons

Original release
- Network: CBS
- Release: September 19, 1987 – October 22, 1988

Mighty Mouse: The New Adventures is an American animated television series. It is a revival of the Mighty Mouse cartoon character. Produced by Bakshi-Hyde Ventures (a joint venture of animator Ralph Bakshi and producer John W. Hyde) and Terrytoons, the show aired on CBS on Saturday mornings from fall 1987 through the 1988–89 season. It was briefly rerun on Saturday mornings on Fox Kids in November and December 1992. The series began airing reruns on MeTV Toons as part of Mighty Mouse and Friends on November 2, 2025.

The quality of Mighty Mouse as compared with other 1980s animated television series is considered by animation historian Jerry Beck to "foreshadow the higher quality [animation] boom coming in the next decade." It was one of the first Saturday morning cartoons on CBS to be broadcast in stereo.

== Format ==
The series was a commercial half-hour format (22 minutes plus commercials), and each episode consisted of two self-contained 11-minute cartoon segments. It differed from the earlier incarnations of Mighty Mouse in many ways.

The show gave Mighty Mouse the secret identity of Mike Mouse and a sidekick in the form of the orphan Scrappy Mouse (who knows the hero's secret identity). The cast included heroic colleagues such as Bat-Bat and his sidekick Tick the Bug Wonder and the League of Super-Rodents, and introduced antagonists like Petey Pate, Big Murray, Madame Marsupial and the Cow. The original Mighty Mouse villain, Oil Can Harry, made a couple of appearances. Pearl Pureheart was not always the damsel in distress and many episodes did not feature her at all. Mighty Mouse's light-operatic singing was eliminated except for his trademark, "Here I come to save the day!" (a trait previously used in The New Adventures of Mighty Mouse and Heckle & Jeckle), which was sometimes interrupted. The tone of the show was much more irreverent than previous incarnations; the character of Bat-Bat, for example, was a bat who dressed as Batman and drove the "Man-Mobile" – a human-looking car with legs instead of wheels. In another episode, Scrappy Mouse expresses concern for Mighty Mouse's whereabouts, but only because he owes Scrappy money.

Unlike other American animated TV shows of the time (and even Mighty Mouse's past theatrical shorts), the show's format was loose and episodes did not follow a particular formula. Some episodes offered parodies of shows like The Honeymooners ("Mighty's Wedlock Whimsy") and the 1960s Batman series ("Night of the Bat-Bat" and "Bat with a Golden Tongue"); movies like Fantastic Voyage ("Mundane Voyage"); Japanese monster films (the opening of "Mighty's Wedlock Whimsy"); and comic books ("See You in the Funny Papers"). The series sometimes lampooned other cartoons ("Don't Touch That Dial!") and specifically Alvin and the Chipmunks ("Mighty's Benefit Plan").

The series resurrected other Terrytoons characters, but acknowledged the passage of time: perennial menace Oil Can Harry returns to chase Pearl Pureheart once more ("Still Oily After All These Years"), the 1940s characters Gandy Goose and Sourpuss and the 1960s character Deputy Dawg are revived (with Gandy and Dawg frozen in time in blocks of ice) in "The Ice Goose Cometh", "Gaston Le Crayon" has a cameo ("Still Oily After All These Years") and Bakshi's own 1960s creations the Mighty Heroes appear, aged, in the episode "Heroes and Zeroes". Fellow Terrytoons characters Heckle and Jeckle also made an appearance in "Mighty's Wedlock Whimsy".

== Cast ==
- Patrick Pinney as Mighty Mouse (Mike Mouse) / Gandy Goose / Petey Pate
- Maggie Roswell as Pearl Pureheart / Additional Voices
- Dana Hill as Scrappy Mouse
- Charlie Adler as Bat-Bat (Bruce Vein) / Additional Voices
- Joe Alaskey as Sourpuss / Additional Voices
- Michael Pataki as The Cow / Additional Voices
- Beau Weaver as Fractured Narrator / Additional Voices

== Crew ==
- Producer/Supervising Director/Story Direction: Ralph Bakshi
- Executive Producer: John Hyde
- Executive in charge of production: Tom Klein
- Senior Director: John Kricfalusi (season 1), Kent Butterworth (season 2)
- Directors: John Kricfalusi, John Sparey, Bruce Woodside, Bob Jaques, Kent Butterworth
- Writers (Season 1): Tom Minton, Doug Moench, Nate Kanfer, Jim Reardon, Eddie Fitzgerald, Rich Moore, Andrew Stanton
- Writers (Season 2): Jim Reardon, Tom Minton
- Layout artists: Ken Boyer, Mike Kazaleh, Kathleen Castillo, William Recinos, Jim Gomez, Lynne Naylor, Dave Concepcion, Bruce Timm

== Development ==
=== Origin and production ===
Mighty Mouse in Ralph Bakshi's adaptation.

In April 1987, Bakshi set up a meeting with Judy Price, the head of CBS's Saturday morning block. Price rejected Bakshi's prepared pitches, including one featuring John Kricfalusi's Ren & Stimpy characters, but asked what else he had. He told her that he had the rights to Mighty Mouse and she agreed to purchase the series. However, Bakshi did not own the rights and did not know who did. While researching the rights, he learned that CBS had acquired the entire Terrytoons library in 1955 and forgotten about it. According to Bakshi, "I sold them a show they already owned, so they just gave me the rights for nothin'!"

Kricfalusi's team wrote story outlines for 13 episodes in a week and pitched them to Price. By the next week, Kricfalusi had hired animators he knew who had been working at other studios. They ended up hiring Jeff Pidgeon, Rich Moore, Carole Holiday, Andrew Stanton and Nate Kanfer. Mighty Mouse: The New Adventures went into production in the month it was greenlighted; it was scheduled to premiere on September 19, 1987. This haste required the crew to be split into four teams, led by supervising director Kricfalusi, Fitzgerald, Steve Gordon and Bruce Woodside. Each team was given a handful of episodes and operated almost entirely independently of the others. Although the scripts required approval by CBS executives, Kricfalusi insisted that the artists add visual gags as they drew.

Despite the time constraints, CBS was pleased with the way Bakshi Productions addressed the network's notes. Kricfalusi did not return for the second season and took some of the crew to work on The New Adventures of Beany and Cecil for ABC.

=== Production style ===
Kricfalusi described Mighty Mouse: The New Adventures as the origin of the "'Creator-Driven' revolution" and that he hired artists "dissatisfied with the formula cartoons they were forced to work on at other studios" and as a "witty, satirical and wildly imaginative" series and "quite a revolution when compared to the cartoons being made everywhere else." Kricfalusi said that he supervised the development of the cartoon in all aspects except the final editing.

Kricfalusi said that he restored the "old time-director-unit system" in which three or four directors theoretically supervise all of the creative aspects of each individual cartoon. He said that two of the directors felt "kind of" reluctant to participate as they did not "really approve" of the direction. Kricfalusi intended for the cartoon to be "like a Warner Bros. cartoon", and that the show does not have his personal humor style. He described the team as "slightly cautious" in presenting ideas to CBS's executives. Artists were allowed to use their own style in the episodes that they worked on, and that one can determine which artist drew which cartoon based on the styles present. Kricfalusi described Ken Boyer's scenes as "cute and dynamic", Istvan Majoros's scenes as "extremely crazy-looking", his own scenes as "very specifically acted", Lynne's scenes as "very girly and cartoony at the same time" and Jim Smith's scenes as "manly and well composed".

While an article about the series in Amazing Heroes #129 made it appear like Bakshi was the director of the show, Kricfalusi clarified that Bakshi was the producer and that Bakshi's creative involvement was the highest during the first several weeks of the production, after which he stood out of the way and let the team go about its business.

=== Usage of older cartoon footage ===
Kricfalusi said "Layouts take a lot of artists, and most studios just shipped them overseas to be done by cheap foreign labor. It wasn't thought of as a creative process. To me, the cartoons had no chance of working without them."

In order to bring down the budget so that layouts could be completed in-house, the show opted to build three entire cartoon segments from vintage Terrytoons cartoon stock footage: "Mighty's Musical Classics", "Animation Concerto" and the bulk of "Scrappy's Playhouse". A dream sequence in "The Ice Goose Cometh" also utilized Terrytoons footage.

Additionally, three segments were clip-shows that re-used animation from previous episodes: "Stress for Success", "Anatomy of a Milquetoast" and "Mighty's Tone Poem".

== Episodes ==
=== Series overview ===
Season	Episodes	Originally released	
Season	Episodes	First released	Last released
1	13	September 19, 1987	December 12, 1987
2	6	September 17, 1988	October 22, 1988

=== Season 1 (1987) ===
No. overall	No. in season	Title	Original release date
1	1	"Night on Bald Pate" "Mouse from Another House"	September 19, 1987
"Night on Bald Pate": Ostracized for having a bald scalp, Petey Pate turns to villainy and kidnaps Pearl to make Mouseville take him seriously.; "Mouse from Another House": Lonely orphan Scrappy listens as Pearl describes Mighty Mouse's beginnings.
2	2	"Me-Yowww!" "Witch Tricks"	September 26, 1987
"Me-Yowww!": Mighty's new pal Durf tries to fit in with mouse society but is rejected, forcing them to go to Cat Town where Durf finds a new friend.; "Witch Tricks": Scrappy helps a sick tooth fairy, but is pursued by a wicked witch. Mighty Mouse comes to the rescue and calms the witch down.
3	3	"Night of the Bat-Bat" "Scrap-Happy"	October 3, 1987
"Night of the Bat-Bat": While Mighty Mouse is away on vacation, Bat-Bat (a parody of Batman) and his sidekick, Tick the Bug Wonder, step in to save Vermin City from some dairy food changes caused by the Cow.; "Scrap-Happy": Scrappy tries to fit in with a shady gang, but he and the gang are sold to the carnival. When the going gets tough, Mighty Mouse is summoned to the rescue.
4	4	"Catastrophe Cat" "Scrappy's Field Day"	October 10, 1987
"Catastrophe Cat": After a long and exhausting aversion of disasters, Mighty Mouse discovers that a hiccupping cat is the culprit.; "Scrappy's Field Day": Mighty Mouse takes Scrappy on a field trip to prehistoric times, braving much danger throughout.
5	5	"The Bagmouse" "The First Deadly Cheese"	October 17, 1987
"The Bagmouse": Scrappy is captured by Mr. Maxie, who intends to commercialise mouse burgers. Mighty Mouse finds out about this and puts a stop to it.; "The First Deadly Cheese": The Cow finds a cosmic cheese and uses it to beat Mighty Mouse. Despite multiple contacts with it, Mighty is able to avoid letting it overwhelm him.
6	6	"This Island Mouseville" "Mighty's Musical Classics"	October 24, 1987
"This Island Mouseville": An alien cat is claiming Mouseville, but he does not prove to be a major threat and his conquest is short-lived.; "Mighty's Musical Classics": In this episode, footage from vintage Terrytoons cartoons play in time to "The Loco-Motion" and "Why Do Fools Fall in Love".
7	7	"The Littlest Tramp" "Puffy Goes Berserk"	October 31, 1987
"The Littlest Tramp": Polly Pineblossom is refusing Mighty's help, so he solves minor problems until he finds out that Big Murray is upsetting Polly (a parody of City Lights and the Color Rhapsody short The Little Match Girl).; "Puffy Goes Berserk": The mutated giant kitten Puffy is terrorising Mouseville. After a brief fight with Mighty, some aliens take Puffy to a place where he will be welcomed and accepted.
8	8	"The League of Super-Rodents" "Scrappy's Playhouse"	November 7, 1987
"The League of Super-Rodents": The Cow defeats the League of Super-Rodents (a parody of the Justice League) to impress Madame Marsupial, but is beaten by the Rampaging Sloth.; "Scrappy's Playhouse": The shady gang sneak into the Mouseville Cinema and combine old Terrytoons Mighty Mouse clips.
9	9	"All You Need Is Glove" "It's Scrappy's Birthday"	November 14, 1987
"All You Need Is Glove": The Glove imprisons Mike and Pearl and they and Scrappy head off to his brother Lefty for help. Mighty takes care not to compromise his secret identity.; "It's Scrappy's Birthday": Thinking no one remembers his birthday, Scrappy moves away with a hobo named Slappy. After Mighty Mouse rescues them, they are surprised with a birthday celebration.
10	10	"Aqua-Guppy" "Animation Concerto"	November 21, 1987
"Aqua-Guppy": A. Crab mistakes Pearl Pureheart for his fiancée and kidnaps her. Mighty's friend Aqua-Guppy brings A. Crab's real fiancée to him.; "Animation Concerto": Old Terrytoons cartoons play in sequence to a jazz concerto song about Mighty Mouse.
11	11	"The Ice Goose Cometh" "Pirates with Dirty Faces"	November 28, 1987
"The Ice Goose Cometh": Gandy Goose thaws from an iceberg, but he is lost without Sourpuss. Mighty is overwhelmed by Gandy's antics, but he manages to reunite him with Sourpuss.; "Pirates with Dirty Faces": The shady gang are abducted on a pirate ship and, after a mutiny, are deceived by the pirates. They wake up from this staged nightmare ready to reform.
12	12	"Mighty's Benefit Plan" "See You in the Funny Papers"	December 5, 1987
"Mighty's Benefit Plan": Mighty takes Scrappy to meet Elwy and the Tree Weasels. At the concert that night, Mighty saves the Mouseville Orphans' benefit from going to ruin.; "See You in the Funny Papers": Mighty must defeat villains from Crimebusters Comics that have come to life, while an alien force invades Mouseville.
13	13	"Heroes and Zeroes" "Stress for Success"	December 12, 1987
"Heroes and Zeroes": After Big Murray's ransom scheme backfires, Mighty Mouse and the Mighty Heroes are out to capture rampaging stolen numbers.; "Stress for Success": An overworked Mighty Mouse tries to recuperate, but old Terrytoons adventures make him restless. However, he gains his needed strength.

=== Season 2 (1988) ===
No. overall	No. in season	Title	Original release date
14	1	"Day of the Mice" "Still Oily After All These Years"	September 17, 1988
"Day of the Mice": Petey Pate forms a rebellion to overwhelm cats. Shocked by the mice's bullying, Pearl protests and Mighty comes to the rescue and restores order.; "Still Oily After All These Years": The Cow bails out Oil Can Harry, who wastes no time pursuing Pearl, but his visit to Pearl becomes stressful and he wishes to go back to prison.
15	2	"Mighty's Wedlock Whimsy" "Anatomy of a Milquetoast"	September 24, 1988
"Mighty's Wedlock Whimsy": Gandy Goose and Sourpuss try to bring Pearl and Mighty together for marriage. After a long hesitation, Mighty reconsiders about the marriage.; "Anatomy of a Milquetoast": Mighty Mouse is charged with Scrappy's disappearance. As the case nears to an end, a monster Scrappy approaches. All this time Scrappy was having a nightmare.
16	3	"Bat with a Golden Tongue" "Mundane Voyage"	October 1, 1988
"Bat with a Golden Tongue": Bat-Bat is sent to stop Ski Nose's numerous thefts of golden awards, all with Mighty Mouse's assistance. Ski Nose is a caricature of Bob Hope.; "Mundane Voyage": Mighty Mouse and Pearl go inside the President's body to cure his cardiac ailment within one hour.
17	4	"Snow White & the Motor City Dwarfs" "Don't Touch That Dial!"	October 8, 1988
"Snow White & the Motor City Dwarfs": Mighty Mouse pitches out his retelling of Snow White and the Seven Dwarfs.; "Don't Touch That Dial!": A little boy switches Mighty Mouse from channel to channel, until Mighty Mouse breaks out and convinces him to do something different.
18	5	"Mouse and Supermouse" "The Bride of Mighty Mouse"	October 15, 1988
"Mouse and Supermouse": Petey Pate builds Supermouse robots to replace Mighty Mouse, but they become corrupted, so Mighty terminates them.; "The Bride of Mighty Mouse": 20 years later Mighty is married to Pearl, running a motel and raising their son, but is threatened by Howard Hack (a parody of Howard Roark from Ayn Rand's The Fountainhead) rivaling with his own motel.
19	6	"A Star Is Milked" "Mighty's Tone Poem"	October 22, 1988
"A Star Is Milked": Mighty heads to Hollywood to become a star, but the Cow seeks to sabotage his position. Mighty co-stars with him instead.; "Mighty's Tone Poem": Mighty Mouse has the villains watch some previous episodes of Mighty Mouse, with many interruptions throughout.

== Home media ==
On January 5, 2010, CBS Home Entertainment (distributed by Paramount) released the complete series on three DVDs, with every installment of the Saturday morning cartoon uncut and presented in the original full screen video format. The collection includes the uncut version of "The Littlest Tramp", in which the controversial scene begins at 9:41 in the episode, but features an error in the version of "Mighty's Wedlock Whimsy" included on the set, where the penultimate live action shot of layout artist Ed Bell is substituted with an animatic version of the shot. The actual shot as aired appears in the included documentary.

Among the extras are the documentary "Breaking the Mold: The Re-Making of Mighty Mouse" and commentary tracks for several episodes. Also included are three original Terrytoons theatrical Mighty Mouse cartoon shorts, as taken from Paramount's vaults, which are the first-ever official release of Terrytoons material on DVD.

== Controversy ==
Stills from the Mighty Mouse: The New Adventures episode "The Littlest Tramp". Top left: the flower is crushed by the rich man. Top right: Mighty Mouse receives the remains of the flower, which falls apart in his hand. Bottom left: Mighty Mouse thinks fondly of the girl, and brings out what's left of the flower. Bottom right: Mighty Mouse smells the flower, inhaling it in the process.

The show's content sometimes crossed into controversial territory. In "Mighty's Wedlock Whimsy", it is hinted that peripheral male characters Gandy Goose and Sourpuss are showering together, and — in a dream sequence — that Pearl Pureheart has a child with Mighty Mouse's unhinged nemesis, the Cow.

During the production of the episode "The Littlest Tramp", editor Tom Klein expressed concern that a sequence showing Mighty Mouse sniffing the remains of a crushed flower resembled cocaine use. Bakshi did not initially view the footage; he believed that Klein was overreacting, but agreed to let him cut the scene. Kricfalusi expressed disbelief over the cut, insisting that the action was harmless and that the sequence should be restored. Following Kricfalusi's advice, Bakshi told Klein to restore the scene, which had been approved by network executives and the CBS Standards and Practices department. The episode aired on October 31, 1987, initially without controversy.

On June 6, 1988, Donald Wildmon, head of the American Family Association (AFA), alleged that "The Littlest Tramp" depicted cocaine use, instigating a media frenzy. Concerning Bakshi's involvement with Mighty Mouse: The New Adventures, the AFA claimed that CBS "intentionally hired a well-known pornographer to do a cartoon for children, and then allowed him to insert a scene in which the cartoon hero is shown sniffing cocaine." Bakshi responded, "You could pick a still out of Lady and the Tramp and get the same impression. Fritz the Cat wasn't pornography. It was social commentary. This all smacks of burning books and the Third Reich. It smacks of McCarthyism. I'm not going to get into who sniffs what. This is lunacy!"

Bakshi defended the episode, saying, "I despise drugs. I would be out of my mind to show a cartoon character snorting cocaine in a cartoon", and stating that Wildmon had interpreted the scene out of context. "Mighty Mouse was happy after smelling the flowers because it helped him remember the little girl who sold it to him fondly. But even if you're right, their accusations become part of the air we breathe. That's why I cut the scene. I can't have children wondering if Mighty Mouse is using cocaine." On CBS's order, Klein removed the sequence from the master broadcast footage.

Wildmon claimed that the edits were "a de facto admission that, indeed, Mighty Mouse was snorting cocaine". Bakshi agreed to the removal of the offending 3½ seconds from future airings of the episode because of his concern that the controversy might lead children to believe that what Wildmon was saying was true. Wildmon's group then demanded the removal of Bakshi but, on July 25, 1988, CBS released a statement in support of him.

== Influence and legacy ==
The show was considered revolutionary at the time and, along with 1988's Who Framed Roger Rabbit, inspired a wave of animated shows that were much zanier than those that had dominated children's animation in the previous two decades. It is credited by some as the impetus for the "creator-driven" animation revolution of the 1990s.

The series was a springboard for many cartoonists and animators who would later become famous, among them John Kricfalusi (creator of The Ren & Stimpy Show), Bruce Timm (creator of Batman: The Animated Series), Jim Reardon (writer for Tiny Toon Adventures, WALL-E, Zootopia and Ralph Breaks the Internet, and director for The Simpsons), Tom Minton (writer and producer for many Warner Bros. Animation productions, including Tiny Toons, Animaniacs, The Sylvester & Tweety Mysteries, Baby Looney Tunes and Duck Dodgers), Lynne Naylor (co-founded Spümcø with Kricfalusi, character designer for Batman: The Animated Series and storyboard artist for The Powerpuff Girls and Cow and Chicken), Rich Moore (animation director for Futurama, director for The Simpsons and director of Wreck-It Ralph, Zootopia and Ralph Breaks the Internet), and Andrew Stanton (director of Finding Nemo, WALL-E and Finding Dory) and others. The Loud House creator Chris Savino says the show's classic cartoon style, which contrasted with the dominant style of TV animation at the time, spurred him to become an animator.

Kricfalusi supervised the production for the first season and directed eight of its 26 segments. Kent Butterworth supervised the second season, after John Kricfalusi's departure to work on the similarly short-lived 1988 animated series The New Adventures of Beany and Cecil.

== Comic book spin-off ==
A Mighty Mouse comic book series was published by Marvel Comics. It lasted for 10 issues from 1990 to 1991 after and took place after this series.

Shortly after the events of Mighty Mouse: The New Adventures, Scrappy abandons Mighty and Pearl to spend all his time at the Four Fingers Video Arcade. When the Four Fingers Video Arcade closes down, Scrappy vanishes. It is revealed that Mighty Mouse's enemy, the Glove, was behind the Four Fingers Video Arcade. Mighty saves Scrappy in the end, but Scrappy is still "zapped" into playing video games. Scrappy is then sent to rehab and is back to normal a few issues later. In the 10th and final issue of the comic, Scrappy substitutes for Pearl Pureheart when she gives up her role in the comic.

== See also ==
- Looney Tunes
- Modern animation in the United States
- Terrytoons
