= Tom Terrific =

20th-century American cartoon

- Genre: Animated television series
- Created by: Gene Deitch
- Developed by: Gene Deitch
- Written by: William Bernal, Phil Eastman, Bud Evsalin, Bob Kuwahara, Ralph Newman
- Directed by: Gene Deitch
- Starring: Lionel Wilson
- Theme music composer: Thomas Lee Morrison, Philip A. Scheib
- No. of seasons: 1
- No. of episodes: 26

Production
- Executive producer: William M. Weiss
- Producer: Gene Deitch
- Editor: Jack MacConnell
- Production company: Terrytoons

Original release
- Network: CBS
- Release: June 10, 1957 – 1959

Tom Terrific is a 1957–1959 animated series on American television, presented as part of the Captain Kangaroo children's television show.

The show features a gee-whiz boy hero, Tom Terrific, who lives in a treehouse and can shapeshift into anything he wants, thanks to his magical funnel-shaped "thinking cap", which also enhances his intelligence. He has a comic lazybones of a sidekick, Mighty Manfred the Wonder Dog, and an archenemy named Crabby Appleton, whose motto is, "I'm rotten to the core!" Other foes include Mr. Instant the Instant Thing King, Captain Kidney Bean, Sweet Tooth Sam the Candy Bandit, and Isotope Feeney the Meany.

== Production ==
Created by Gene Deitch under the Terrytoons studio (which by that time was a subsidiary of CBS, the network that broadcast Captain Kangaroo), Tom Terrific was made as twenty-six stories, each split into five episodes, with one five-minute episode broadcast per day. The first thirteen stories were filmed in 1957, with the second set in 1958. Captain Kangaroo continued to rerun the episodes for many years. Starting in 1962, Captain Kangaroo broadcast Tom Terrific every other week, alternating with Terrytoons' Lariat Sam. It was drawn in a simple black-and-white style reminiscent of children's drawings. Some of the dialogue was written by cartoonist Jules Feiffer.

Gene Deitch adapted the feature from his earlier newspaper comic strip, "Terr'ble Thompson!" distributed during the 1950s by the United Features Syndicate. Terr'ble Thompson was a six-year-old boy who imagined himself to be the "Hero of Hist'ry" and freely time traveled to assist historical figures. An illustrated book reprinting the adventures of this precursor to Tom Terrific was published by Fantagraphics Books.

All the voices were performed by Lionel Wilson (who later voiced Eustace Bagge from the Cartoon Network series Courage the Cowardly Dog).

== Episodes ==
Each episode was shown in five installments, one per day, Monday through Friday.

| Episode | Title | Air Date |
|---|---|---|
| 1 | The Nasty Knight | June 10, 1957 |
| 2 | The Pill of Smartness | June 17, 1957 |
| 3 | Sweet Tooth Sam | June 24, 1957 |
| 4 | Snowy Picture | July 1, 1957 |
| 5 | Crabby Appleton's Dragon | July 8, 1957 |
| 6 | Captain Kidney Bean | July 15, 1957 |
| 7 | The Gravity Maker | July 22, 1957 |
| 8 | Scrambled Dinosaur Eggs | July 29, 1957 |
| 9 | Who Stole the North Pole | August 5, 1957 |
| 10 | Instant Tantrums | August 12, 1957 |
| 11 | Track Meet, Well Done | August 19, 1957 |
| 12 | The Great Calendar Mystery | August 26, 1957 |
| 13 | Elephant Stew | August 2, 1957 |
| 14 | The Missing Mail Mystery | August 9, 1957 |
| 15 | The Prince Frog | September 16, 1957 |
| 16 | Isotope Feeney's Foolish Fog | September 23, 1957 |
| 17 | Moon Over Manfred | September 30, 1957 |
| 18 | Go West, Young Manfred | December 2, 1957 |
| 19 | The Silly Sandman | September 7, 1957 |
| 20 | Crabby Park | October 14, 1957 |
| 21 | The Million Manfred Mystery | October 21, 1957 |
| 22 | The Flying Sorcerer | October 28, 1957 |
| 23 | The Big Dog Show-Off | November 4, 1957 |
| 24 | The End of Rainbows | November 11, 1957 |
| 25 | Robinsnest Crusoe | November 18, 1957 |
| 26 | The Everlasting Birthday Party | November 25, 1957 |

== Reception ==
The character Tom Terrific was ranked #32 by TV Guide magazine on its 2002 list of "50 Greatest TV Cartoon Characters".

== Home video ==
As of 2024, there has not been an authorized VHS, DVD or Blu-ray release of the series.

== In popular culture ==
- The character also appeared in a comic book published by Pines Comics for six issues from Summer 1957 to Fall 1958, with some stories drawn by Ralph Bakshi.
- Tom Terrific appeared in a few Wonder Books, an imitation of Little Golden Books.
- Crabby Appleton was the name of a rock group, which used the character's image on a 1971 album, Rotten to the Core.
- In the introduction to his book, The Great Big Book of Tomorrow, Tom Tomorrow (Dan Perkins) says that he chose his pseudonym through misremembering the name of Tom Terrific.
- Tom Terrific appeared in the 1999 pilot Curbside, voiced by Haley Joel Osment.
- American football player Tom Brady attempted to trademark the phrase for himself, but was turned down in August 2019, to prevent confusion with baseball player Tom Seaver.
