= Sad Cat =

Terrytoons cartoon character created by Ralph Bakshi in 1965

- Sad Cat and his brothers
- First appearance: "Gadmouse the Apprentice Good Fairy" (January, 1965)
- Created by: Ralph Bakshi
- Voiced by: Bob McFadden
- Developed by: Art Bartsch

In-universe information
- Species: Anthropomorphic cat
- Family: Latimore and Fenimore (brothers)

Sad Cat is an animated cartoon character created by director Ralph Bakshi at the Terrytoons studio in 1965. The character was the subject of 13 theatrical cartoons, which were syndicated to television in the early 1970s as part of The Astronut Show.

Eli Bauer and Al Kouzel wrote the cartoons. Film critic and historian Leonard Maltin said that Sad Cat was "perhaps the dreariest character ever created at Terrytoons".

== Overview ==
Sad Cat was a put-upon feline, originally based on the Cinderella character. He lived in the city of Imagination with his two mean brothers, Latimore and Fenimore, and had a fairy godmouse named Gadmouse. In the first five cartoons directed by Bakshi, Gadmouse attempts to earn his wand and become a full-fledged good fairy by helping Sad Cat achieve his goals. Unfortunately, Gadmouse's schemes always go wrong, leaving Sad Cat still under his siblings' thumb.

After Bakshi left the Terrytoons studio in 1967, Arthur Bartsch directed the eight further Sad Cat cartoons. In these more upbeat cartoons, Gadmouse is replaced by Sad Cat's Super Ego, who transforms Sad Cat into a skilled competitor and helps him to triumph over his brothers in various contests, including a fishing competition, a golf tournament, and a judo match.

Bob McFadden performed all of the voices for the cartoon, and was paid $150 for each cartoon. He explained, "They could play the cartoon for a thousand years and you would never get any more money, but you had to do all of the voices for the $150. That's why they wouldn't write women into the scripts because that would be two people they would have to pay."

== Cartoons ==
=== Directed by Ralph Bakshi ===
- Gadmouse the Apprentice Good Fairy (Jan 1965): Gadmouse gives Sad Cat magic dancing shoes, so he can go to the dance club.
- Don't Spill the Beans (April 1965): Gadmouse gives Sad Cat defective magic beans.
- Dress Reversal (July 1965): Sad Cat competes with his brothers in a contest for the best dressed cat.
- The Third Musketeer (Oct 1965): Sad Cat is transformed into a Musketeer so that he can play with his brothers.
- Scuba Duba Do (June 1966): Sad Cat goes scuba diving for sunken treasure with his brothers.

=== Directed by Art Bartsch ===
- Dribble Drabble (July 1967): Super Ego helps Sad Cat become a champion basketball player.
- Big Game Fishing (Aug 1967): Sad Cat competes with his brothers in a fishing competition.
- Grand Prix Winner (Sept 1967): Sad Cat competes in a car race.
- Commander Great Guy (Nov 1967): Sad Cat becomes a TV superhero.
- All Teed Off (Dec 1967): Sad Cat and his brothers compete at golf.
- The Abominable Mountaineers (Dec 1968): Sad Cat and his brothers climb Mount Everest.
- Judo Kudos (Dec 1968): Sad Cat becomes a martial arts champion.
- Loops and Swoops (Dec 1968): Sad Cat competes in a flying contest.
