= Bob Kuwahara =

Japanese-American animator (1901–1964)

Rokuro "Bob" Kuwahara (Japanese: 桑原 六郎, August 12, 1901 – December 10, 1964) was a Japanese-born American animator best known for his work with Walt Disney Productions and Terrytoons between the 1930s and 1960s.

Kuwahara was born in Tokyo on August 12, 1901, and his family moved to the United States in 1910, where he graduated from Los Angeles Polytechnic High School in 1921. After high school he attended the Otis Art Institute in Los Angeles until 1928. In 1929 Kuwahara moved to New York City to work as a commercial artist, but the Wall Street crash of 1929 forced him to return to Los Angeles.

In 1932 Kuwahara began working as an animator and writer for Disney, where he had a hand in shorts like Thru the Mirror and the Academy Award-nominated Who Killed Cock Robin?, as well as the feature-length film Snow White and the Seven Dwarfs. In 1937 Kuwahara went to work for the Metro-Goldwyn-Mayer cartoon studio, but later spent three years in the Heart Mountain internment camp during World War II following the signing of Executive Order 9066.

In 1945 Kuwahara and his family moved to Larchmont, New York where he wrote and drew a comic strip called Miki for five years before low circulation forced him to drop the strip. In 1950 Kuwahara returned to animation, signing on with Paul Terry's Terrytoons studio, and stayed with the studio following CBS' purchase of the studio in 1955. In 1959 Kuwahara wrote and directed the first of 14 Hashimoto-san theatrical shorts, for which he is probably best remembered today. Production of these shorts continued until 1963, after which time they were incorporated into CBS' The Hector Heathcote Show. During the same period Kuwahara was also a director for the popular Deputy Dawg series. Kuwahara's final TV series was 1965's syndicated The Astronut Show.

Kuwahara died in 1964. He was survived by a wife, Julia (1904–1996), and two sons, Denis and Michel.
