= The Adventures of Lariat Sam =

Animated TV series

- Genre: Western
- Starring: Dayton Allen
- Country of origin: United States

Production
- Running time: 5 minutes

Original release
- Network: CBS
- Release: 1962 – 1962

The Adventures of Lariat Sam is an American Western animated television series that ran 59 episodes Saturday mornings on CBS which was a serialized cartoon from Captain Kangaroo in 1962.
