= Gandy Goose =

- Terrytoons character
- First appearance: Gandy the Goose (1938)
- Created by: Paul Terry; John Foster
- Voiced by: Arthur Kay (1938–1940); Tom Morrison (1941–1955); Roy Halee (1944); Patrick Pinney (1987–1988)

In-universe information
- Species: Goose
- Gender: Male

Gandy Goose is a Terrytoons cartoon character who first appeared in the 1938 short Gandy the Goose. He is frequently paired with Sourpuss, a cat, beginning in the 1939 short Hook Line and Sinker. Sourpuss' first appearance was in the 1939 short The Owl and the Pussycat, and had appearances without Gandy in the shorts How Wet Was My Ocean (1940), Fishing Made Easy (1941), and A Torrid Toreador (1942). Originally voiced by Arthur Kay from 1938 to 1941, Gandy spoke in a lyrical vocal parody of radio comedian Ed Wynn while Sourpuss vocally impersonated an impatient Jimmy Durante. Their surreal adventures often showcase extended dreams, bookended by coarse bedroom arguments.

Gandy was used to promote the U.S. war effort during World War II. In the cartoons, Gandy Goose joined the US Army in 1941 in the cartoon "Flying Fever" and also in "The Home Guard".

Gandy Goose appeared in a total of 54 cartoons between 1938 and 1955. He also made two appearances in Mighty Mouse: The New Adventures (1987–1988) voiced by Patrick Pinney. Sourpuss also appears in the series, voiced by Joe Alaskey. Here, Gandy and Sourpuss are heavily implied to be lovers and are shown showering together.

An unidentified background character resembling Gandy Goose appeared in the final scene of the 1988 film Who Framed Roger Rabbit, alongside obscure Terrytoons characters Oscar The Timid Pig and Looey Lion.

Gandy Goose (along with Sourpuss) is one of the only characters who did not appear in the 1999 Terrytoons pilot Curbside, likely to avoid comparisons to Ren and Stimpy.

== Comic books ==
Gandy Goose and Sourpuss also appeared in comic books, beginning in 1942 and lasting until 1964. Starting out published by Timely Comics, Gandy Goose was a regular feature in such titles as Terry-Toons Comics and Mighty Mouse, as well as the superhero titles Young Allies and Captain America Comics. In 1947, St. John Publications took over the licensing of Terrytoons characters; Gandy Goose continued to appear in Terry-Toons Comics and Mighty Mouse as well as Dinky Duck, Heckle and Jeckle, and his own self-titled series, which ran four issues from March 1953 to November 1953 and an additional two issues at Pines Comics from 1956 to 1958. Gandy Goose appeared in issues of Dell Comics' New Terrytoons title in the early 1960s and then in Mighty Mouse when it was being published by Western Publishing.

== Filmography ==
Gandy Goose appeared in the following 54 cartoons:

- Gandy the Goose (March 4, 1938)
- Goose Flies High (September 9, 1938)
- Doomsday (December 16, 1938)
- The Frame-Up (December 30, 1938)
- G-Man Jitters (March 10, 1939)
- A Bully Romance (June 16, 1939)
- Barnyard Baseball (July 14, 1939)
- Hook, Line and Sinker (September 8, 1939)
- The Hitchhiker (December 1, 1939)
- It Must Be Love (April 5, 1940)
- The Magic Pencil (November 15, 1940)
- The Home Guard (March 7, 1941)
- Good Old Irish Tunes (June 27, 1941)
- The One Man Navy (September 5, 1941)
- Slap Happy Hunters (October 31, 1941)
- Flying Fever (December 26, 1941)
- Sham Battle Shenanigans (March 20, 1942)
- The Night (April 17, 1942)
- Lights Out (April 17, 1942)
- Tricky Business (May 1, 1942)
- The Outpost (July 10, 1942)
- Tire Trouble (July 24, 1942)
- Night Life in the Army (October 12, 1942)
- Scrap for Victory (January 22, 1943)
- Barnyard Blackout (March 5, 1943)
- The Last Round Up (May 14, 1943)
- Camouflage (August 27, 1943)
- Somewhere in Egypt (September 17, 1943)
- Aladdin's Lamp (October 22, 1943)
- The Frog and the Princess (April 7, 1944)
- My Boy Johnny (May 12, 1944)
- Carmen's Veranda (July 28, 1944)
- The Ghost Town (September 22, 1944)
- Gandy's Dream Girl (December 8, 1944)
- Post War Inventions (March 23, 1945)
- Fisherman's Luck (March 23, 1945)
- Mother Goose Nightmare (May 4, 1945)
- Aesop Fable: The Mosquito (June 29, 1945)
- Who's Who in the Jungle (October 19, 1945)
- The Exterminator (November 23, 1945)
- Fortune Hunters (February 8, 1946)
- It's All in the Stars (April 12, 1946)
- The Golden Hen (May 24, 1946)
- Peace-Time Football (July 19, 1946)
- Mexican Baseball (March 14, 1947)
- The Chipper Chipmunk (March 9, 1948)
- Dingbat Land (February 1, 1949)
- The Covered Pushcart (August 26, 1949)
- Comic Book Land (December 23, 1949)
- Dream Walking (June 9, 1950)
- Wide Open Spaces (November 1, 1950)
- Songs of Erin (February 25, 1951)
- Spring Fever (March 18, 1951)
- Barnyard Actor (January 25, 1955)
