= Bradley Bolke =

American voice actor (1925–2019)

- Born: October 1, 1925; New York City, U.S.
- Died: January 15, 2019 (aged 93); Dobbs Ferry, New York, U.S.
- Occupation: Voice actor
- Years active: 1961–1984
- Relatives: Dayton Allen (brother)

Bradley Bolke (October 1, 1925 – January 15, 2019) was an American voice actor. He was best known for his role as Chumley the Walrus on Tennessee Tuxedo and His Tales.

== Early life ==
Bolke was born on October 1, 1925, in New York City. He later lived in Dobbs Ferry, New York. His brother was actor Dayton Allen.

He was the son of Helen and Sol Bolke, a dress manufacturer.

== Filmography ==
Year	Title	Role	Notes
1962	The First Family	Nikita Khrushchev	
1963	New Casper Cartoon Show		Voice (including "The Ghostly Trio")
1963-1966	Tennessee Tuxedo and His Tales	Chumley the Walrus	Voice, 70 episodes
1964	Diary of a Bachelor	Bachelor	
1964	Underdog	Chumley the Walrus / Jerboa Jump	Voice
1967	The Wacky World of Mother Goose	Crooked Man	Voice
1972	The ABC Saturday Superstar Movie	Shmitzel / Norman	Voice, 2 episodes
1974	The Year Without a Santa Claus	Jangle Bells	TV movie, Voice (final film role)
