= Carlo Vinci =

American animator

Carlo Vinci (February 27, 1906 – September 30, 1993) was an American animator active from the 1930s to the 1970s. He is mainly known for his career at the Terrytoons and Hanna-Barbera cartoon studios. Among the characters he animated were the original Mighty Mouse, Yogi Bear and Flintstones.

== Biography ==
He was born Carlo A. Vinciguerra on February 27, 1906 in the city of New York, as the only son of a family of Italian immigrants. His father Andrea was a barber, and his mother Maria a seamstress.

He worked as a commercial artist from 1921 to 1932. In 1924, Vinci was awarded the scholarship for the National Academy of Design when he was in high school, he graduated in 1929 and received a silver medal. In 1933, he was hired at the Van Beuren Studios in New York as an animator, where he trained a young newcomer named Joe Barbera. When Van Beuren closed, Vinci found work at the Terrytoons studio. In 1938, he met his future wife Margaret Leonardi. They married in 1939, they became parents to four children and they also had 10 grandchildren and were together for the next 54 years.

Vinci was fired during a nasty strike at Terrytoons on May 16, 1947 but returned on November 15. In 1955, Vinci was offered a job at MGM in California by Barbera, where he was first credited on the animated short "Give and Tyke." He remained at the studio until it closed in 1957. Barbera helped Vinci land a temporary job with the Walt Disney studio until the Hanna-Barbera cartoon studio opened later that year. Vinci was one of the original four animators hired at H-B, and remained there until his retirement in 1979.

He died in Ventura, California at age 87.

== Filmography ==
- Van Beuren Studios (1933-1936)
- Terrytoons (1936-1955)
- MGM Cartoons (1955-1957)
- Walt Disney Productions (1957-1959)
- Hanna-Barbera (1957-1979)
- Bakshi Productions (1973)
