= Heckle and Jeckle =

Animated cartoon magpies created by Paul Terry of Terrytoons

- Terrytoons characters
- First appearance: The Talking Magpies (Terrytoons, 1946) (prototypes); The Uninvited Pests (Terrytoons, 1946) (official)
- Created by: Paul Terry
- Voiced by: Danny Webb (1946–1947); Sid Raymond (1947); Dayton Allen (1947–1952, 1966); Ned Sparks (1950); Roy Halee (1950–1960); Tom Morrison (1959); Frank Welker (The New Adventures of Mighty Mouse and Heckle & Jeckle); Toby Huss and Bobcat Goldthwait (Curbside); Shinsuke Minami; Isamu Nagato (CR TerryToons)

In-universe information
- Species: Yellow-billed magpies
- Gender: Males

Heckle and Jeckle are animated cartoon characters created by Paul Terry, originally produced at his own Terrytoons animation studio and released through 20th Century Fox. The characters are a pair of identical anthropomorphic yellow-billed magpies who usually cause problems to others and for themselves with their bizarre antics. Heckle speaks in a tough New York style manner, while Jeckle has a more polite British accent. They were voiced at different times by Danny Webb (1946–47), Sid Raymond (1947), Dayton Allen (1947–52, 1966), Ned Sparks (1950), Roy Halee (1950–60), and Frank Welker (1979).

== Production history ==
A still from "The Talking Magpies". This short featured prototypes of the duo.

The Talking Magpies, released January 4, 1946, was the first Terrytoons cartoon to feature a pair of wisecracking magpies. This was a husband-and-wife pair, not the pair of identical birds that they would become. Terry was taken with the idea of a pair of identical characters, and followed up with The Uninvited Pests (November 29, 1946), which established the pair as new characters. Terrytoons made 52 Heckle and Jeckle theatrical cartoons between 1946 and 1966. The early cartoons paired the duo with the popular song of the time, "Listen to the Mocking Bird", as their theme.

== Television shows ==
After Paul Terry sold the Terrytoons studio to CBS in 1955, the studio's cartoons were repackaged in different timeslots. In summer 1956, the premiere episode of the primetime CBS Cartoon Theater included the 1947 magpie short Flying South.

The Heckle and Jeckle Cartoon Show premiered on CBS Saturday mornings on October 14, 1956, and aired until 1966. The show also included shorts starring other Terrytoons characters, including Mighty Mouse, Little Roquefort and Percy the Cat, Gandy Goose, Dinky Duck and the Terry Bears.

After a hiatus, the show moved to NBC Saturday mornings in September 1969, and aired until September 4, 1971.

The New Adventures of Mighty Mouse and Heckle & Jeckle premiered on CBS Saturday mornings on September 8, 1979. The show featured newly-animated 11-minute magpie cartoons, in which the characters were not as abrasive as their theatrical personas. The hour-long show featured two Heckle and Jeckle cartoons. The show was cut to a half-hour for the 1980-1981 season, and featured one Heckle and Jeckle cartoon.

Heckle and Jeckle made a cameo in the 1988 Mighty Mouse: The New Adventures episode "Mighty's Wedlock Whimsy", alongside a few other Terrytoons characters, but they have no speaking lines.

In an unreleased 1999 Terrytoons pilot called Curbside, Heckle was voiced by Toby Huss and Jeckle was voiced by comedian Bobcat Goldthwait. They were also changed from magpies to crows.

== Comic books and licensing ==
Gold Key Comics Heckle and Jeckle #2, from February 1962

Heckle and Jeckle have been licensed for toys, T-shirts, puzzles, games, salt and pepper shakers, Halloween costumes, plush dolls, puppets, coloring books, cookie jars and other consumer products for decades, variously through Terrytoons, CBS Television and Viacom. Selected cartoons from the original series of 52 theatrical titles were briefly made available on VHS home video in the 1990s, but a major DVD release has yet to materialize. The characters also regularly appeared in comic books over the years, including "Mighty Mouse", "Terrytoons" and "Paul Terry's Comics", and even headlined a number of their own comic book titles:

- St. John Publications, Heckle and Jeckle #1–24 (1951–55)
- Pines Comics, Heckle and Jeckle #25–34 (1956–59)
- Dell Comics, New Terrytoons #6–8 (1962)
- Gold Key Comics, New Terrytoons #1–43; 47 (1962–77)

Heckle and Jeckle were planned to have a cameo in the deleted scene "Acme's Funeral" from the 1988 film Who Framed Roger Rabbit.

== Home video ==
Aside from the bootleg VHS and DVDs, there were a few authorized home video releases.

1978 - Magnetic Video released VHS and Betamax tapes that included Heckle & Jeckle:

- 5 Terrytoon Cartoons Featuring Heckle & Jeckle included "Stowaways" along with 4 other Terrytoons.
- 5 Terrytoon Cartoons Featuring Mighty Mouse included "King Tut's Tomb" along with 4 other Terrytoons.

1981 - RCA Selectavision CED discs (not laserdiscs):

- Terrytoons Volume 1 featuring Mighty Mouse included "Wild Life" and "Miami Maniacs" along with 13 other Terrytoons.

1989 - Video Treasures released VHS tapes (at LP speed):

- The Best of Terrytoons included "The Talking Magpies" along with 5 other Terrytoons.
- Terrytoon Olympics included "Gooney Golfers" along with 5 other Terrytoons.
- Heckle & Jeckle vol.1 featured "Magpie Madness", "Free Enterprise", "The Power of Thought", "The Stowaways", and "Happy Landing".
- Heckle & Jeckle vol.2 featured "The Intruders", "Flying South", "Fishing By The Sea", "The Super Salesmen", "The Hitch-Hikers", and "A Sleepless Night".

No official laserdiscs, DVDs, or Blu-rays were released.

== Filmography ==
1946

- The Talking Magpies (prototypes) (January 4)
- The Uninvited Pests (official debut) (November 29)

1947

- McDougal's Rest Farm (January 31)
- Happy Go Lucky (February 28)
- Cat Trouble (April 11)
- The Intruders (May 9)
- Flying South (August 15)
- Fishing By the Sea (September 19)
- The Super Salesman (October 24)
- The Hitch Hikers (December 12)

1948

- Taming the Cat (April 14)
- A Sleepless Night (August 24)
- Out Again in Again (November 1)
- Magpie Madness (November 2)
- Free Enterprise (November 23)
- Goony Golfers (December 1)
- The Power of Thought (December 31)

1949

- The Lion Hunt (May 13)
- Happy Landing (June 5)
- Hula Hula Land (June 22)
- The Stowaways (July 1)
- Dancing Shoes (November 11)

1950

- The Fox Hunt (February 17)
- A Merry Chase (February 21)
- King Tut's Tomb (September 29)
- Rival Romeos (November 7)

1951

- Bulldozing the Bull (March 11)
- The Rainmakers (May 13)
- Steeple Jacks (June 27)
- 'Sno Fun (August 22)
- Movie Madness (November 7)

1952

- Off to the Opera (February 22)
- House Busters (June 6)
- Moose on the Loose (August 22)
- Hair Cut-Ups (October 11)
- Pill Peddlers (December 13)

1953

- Ten Pin Terrors (April 7)
- Bargain Daze (June 12)
- Log Rollers (September 4)
- Blind Date (November 27)

1954

- Satisfied Customers (February 4)
- Blue Plate Symphony (October 29)

1955

- Miami Maniacs (November 12)
- Pirate's Gold (December 14)

1959

- Wild Life (September 1)

1960

- Thousand Smile Checkup (April 24)
- Trapeze, Pleeze (June 12)
- Mint Men (June 23)
- Deep Sea Doodle (September 16)
- Stunt Men (November 23)

1961

- Sappy New Year (November 10)

1966

- Messed Up Movie Makers (June 1)
