= Bob McFadden =

American actor (1923–2000)

- Born: Robert McFadden; January 19, 1923; East Liverpool, Ohio, US
- Died: January 7, 2000 (aged 76); Delray Beach, Florida, US
- Occupations: Singer, impressionist, voice-over artist
- Years active: 1945–1989

Robert McFadden (January 19, 1923 – January 7, 2000) was an American singer, impressionist, and voice-over actor perhaps best known for his many contributions to animated cartoons.

His most popular television cartoon characters included Milton the Monster from the ABC series The Milton The Monster Show; Cool McCool from the NBC series Cool McCool; and Snarf from the syndicated series ThunderCats.

McFadden was also the voice behind numerous radio and television commercial parts including Franken Berry in the animated commercials for the General Mills Franken Berry cereal as well as the pet parrot who cackled "ring around the collar" in the TV commercials for Wisk laundry detergent. He also performed the voices for the Sad Cat theatrical cartoons.

== Musical career ==
While in the United States Navy during World War II, he began performing as a singer and impressionist. After the war, he went on to work at a steel mill in Pittsburgh, Pennsylvania, and continued performing nights as an opening act for artists such as Harry Belafonte. In 1959, he appeared as a singer with folk music artist Rod McKuen on the Brunswick Records album entitled Songs Our Mummy Taught Us which included the two tracks, "The Mummy" and "The Beat Generation", also released as a single. "The Beat Generation" was later used by Richard Hell as the basis for his song "Blank Generation".

== Voice acting ==
When McFadden moved to New York City after his work in Pittsburgh, he obtained extensive voice-over work in both commercials and animation. He was featured on the best-selling 1962 Vaughn Meader comedy LP The First Family.

In 1963, McFadden released the Audio Fidelity Records parody album entitled Fast, Fast, Fast Relief From TV Commercials followed by the 1968 Columbia Records spoken-word album The Medium Is the Massage. In 1977, McFadden voiced Chugs the Train in the animated Rankin/Bass Easter special The Easter Bunny Is Comin' To Town.

=== Roles ===
==== Movies and TV specials ====
- 1966 – The Soupy Sales Hour – Various Roles
- 1967 – The Wacky World of Mother Goose – Count Warptwist
- 1972 – The Enchanted World of Danny Kaye: "The Emperor's New Clothes" – Jasper
- 1974 – The Year Without a Santa Claus – Jingle Bells, Additional Voices
- 1977 – The Easter Bunny Is Comin' to Town – Chugs
- 1979 – Rudolph and Frosty's Christmas in July – Additional Voices
- 1980 – I Go Pogo – Howland Owl/Bothered Bat
- 1980 – Pinocchio's Christmas – Cricket
- 1981 – The Berenstain Bears Easter Special – Boss Bunny
- 1982 – The Flight of Dragons – Sir Orrin Neville-Smythe/Gorbash The Dragon
- 1985 – The Life & Adventures of Santa Claus – Tingler
- 1985 – ThunderCats – Lynx-O/Snarf/Slithe
- 1987 – The Wind in the Willows – Magistrate

==== TV ====
- 1964 – Linus the Lionhearted – Loveable Truly, Rory, So-Hi
- 1965 – Astronut – Astronut/Oscar
- 1965–1966 – Milton the Monster – Milton
- 1966 – Cool McCool – Cool McCool/Dr. Madcap/Harry McCool
- 1966 – Journey to the Bottom of the Sea – Invader
- 1972–1973 – ABC Afternoon Superstar Movies – Barron Von Frankenstein/Additional Voices
- 1980 – Drawing Power – Additional Voices
- 1983 – The Coneheads – Louie Boucher
- 1980 – Gnomes – Kostya the Gnome
- 1985–1989 – ThunderCats – Snarf/Ma-Mutt/Slithe/Driller/Grune The Destroyer/Tug-Mug/Topspinner/Snarfer/Wolo/Mole Master/Two Time/Polly/Quick Pick/Char/Dr. Dometone/Captain Bragg/Giantors/Bundun/Living Ooze/Burnout/Charr-Nin/Dirge/Enflamer/Micrit Leader/Mad Bubbler/Maftet/Mongor/Mr. Grubber/Mule/Screwloose/Terator/Zaxx/Tuskas/Trollog/Thunderian Guard/Captain Shiner/Guard/Cave Dweller
- 1986 – Silverhawks – Commander Stargazer/Steelwill/Yesman/Hardware/Condor/Flashback

==== Shorts ====
- 1965 - Gadmouse the Apprentice Good Fairy - Sad Cat/Gadmouse/Latimore/Fenimore
- 1965 - Don't Spill the Beans - Sad Cat/Gadmouse/Latimore/Fenimore
- 1965 - Dress Reversal - Sad Cat/Gadmouse/Latimore/Fenimore
- 1965 - The Third Musketeer - Sad Cat/Gadmouse/Latimore/Fenimore
- 1966 – Haunted Housecleaning – Oscar
- 1966– The Defiant Giant – George the Giant
- 1966 – Scuba Duba Do – Sad Cat/Gadmouse/Latimore/Fenimore
- 1966 – Va-Room Service – Additional Voices
- 1966 – Mighty Heroes – Oscar/Gadmouse
- 1967 – The Squawk Peg – Geronimo/Say-Ah the Medicine Man/Foback/Big Yawn
- 1967 – Clean Sweep – Policeman/Repairman
- 1967 – Mouse Trek – Cat
- 1967 – The Fuz – The Cat
- 1967 - Big Game Fishing - Sad Cat/Fenimore/Latimore/Super Ego
- 1967 – Grand Prix Winner – Sad Cat/Fenimore/Latimore/Super Ego/Announcer
- 1967 – All Teed Off – Sad Cat/Fenimore/Latimore
- 1967 - Dribble Drabble - Sad Cat/Fenimore/Latimore/Super Ego
- 1968 – Commander Great Guy – Sad Cat/Fenimore/Latimore/Super Ego
- 1968 – Judo Kudos – Sad Cat/Fenimore/Latimore/Super Ego
- 1968 – The Abominable Mountaineers – Sad Cat/Fenimore/Latimore/Super Ego
- 1968 – Loops and Swoops – Sad Cat/Fenimore/Latimore/Super Ego
- 1969 – Scientific Sideshow – Oscar
- 1969 – Balloon Snatcher – Oscar
- 1970 – The Proton Pulsator – Oscar/Gadmouse
- 1971 – Oscar's Birthday Present – Oscar
- 1974 – 'Twas the Night Before Christmas – Substation Operator, Councilmen, Handyman
- 1976 – The Little Drummer Boy Book II – Additional Voices
- 1977 – The Four Kings – Beaver
- 1981 – The Leprechaun Christmas Gold – Additional Voices

== Later life ==
McFadden continued to work until the late 1980s, when he was forced to retire due to failing health. On January 7, 2000, he died in Delray Beach, Florida, at the age of 76.
