= Terrytoons =

Defunct American animation studio

Terrytoons, Inc.
- Logo used since 1956
- Formerly: Moser & Terry, Inc. (1929–1936)
- Industry: Animation
- Predecessor: Van Beuren Studios
- Founded: 1929; 97 years ago
- Founders: Paul Terry; Frank Moser; Joseph Coffman
- Defunct: December 29, 1972; 53 years ago
- Fate: Closed
- Successors: Viacom; Paramount Animation; Skydance Corporation
- Headquarters: 1929–1930, Long Island, New York, United States; August 1930–1932, Bronx, New York, United States; 1932–1935, Manhattan, New York, United States; 1935–1949, "K" Building, New Rochelle, New York, United States; 1949–1972, New Rochelle, New York, United States
- Key people: Paul Terry; Frank Moser; Tom Morrison; Connie Rasinski; Eddie Donnelly; Mannie Davis; Carlo Vinci; Jim Tyer; Gene Deitch; Bill Weiss; Ralph Bakshi
- Products: Theatrical animated short films
- Parent: Viacom (1956–1972)

Terrytoons, Inc. was an American animation studio headquartered in New Rochelle, New York, which was active from 1929 until its closure on December 29, 1972 (and returned between 1987 and 1996 for television in name only). Founded by Paul Terry, Frank Moser, and Joseph Coffman, it operated out of the "K" Building in downtown New Rochelle and later nearby at 38 Centre Avenue. The studio created many cartoon characters including Fanny Zilch, Mighty Mouse, Heckle and Jeckle, Gandy Goose, Sourpuss, Dinky Duck, Little Roquefort, the Terry Bears, Dimwit, and Luno; Terry's pre-existing character Farmer Al Falfa was also often featured in the series.

The "New Terrytoons" period of the late 1950s through the mid-1960s produced new characters such as Clint Clobber, Tom Terrific, Deputy Dawg, Hector Heathcote, Hashimoto-san, Sidney the Elephant, Possible Possum, James Hound, Astronut, Sad Cat, The Mighty Heroes, and Sally Sargent. Also during that time, Ralph Bakshi got his start as an animator, and eventually as a director, at Terrytoons.

Terrytoons shorts were originally released to theaters by 20th Century Fox from 1938 until 1971. After Terry retired in 1956, CBS bought the studio, then later obtained the library. The enactment of the FCC's Financial Interest and Syndication Rules resulted in CBS selling Terrytoons to Viacom, who would suspend the studio's operations.

== History ==
=== Pre-Terrytoons era ===
Farmer Al Falfa in "River of Doubt" (1927)

Terry first worked for Bray Studios in 1916, where he created the Farmer Al Falfa series. He then made a Farmer Al Falfa short for Edison Pictures, called "Farmer Al Falfa's Wayward Pup" (1917), and some later cartoons were made for Paramount Pictures.

Around 1921, Terry founded the Fables animation studio, named for its Aesop's Film Fables series, in conjunction with the studio of Amedee J. Van Beuren. Fables churned out a Fable cartoon every week for eight years in the 1920s. Terry's brother, John Terry, animated on the films from 1921 to 1922. John soon left the business for comics, later introducing Scorchy Smith in 1930. Other animators included Frank Moser, John Foster, Jerry Shields, Harry Bailey, Bill Tytla, and Mannie Davis (brother of Art Davis.).

In 1928, Van Beuren, anxious to compete with the new phenomenon of talking pictures, released Terry's Dinner Time (released October 1928). Van Beuren then urged Terry to start producing actual sound films, instead of postsynchronizing the cartoons. Terry refused, and Van Beuren fired him in 1929. Almost immediately, Terry and many of his staff started up a new studio near his former studio, incorporated as Moser & Terry, Inc. One staff member during that time was Art Babbitt, who went on to become a well-known Disney animator.

=== Peak era ===
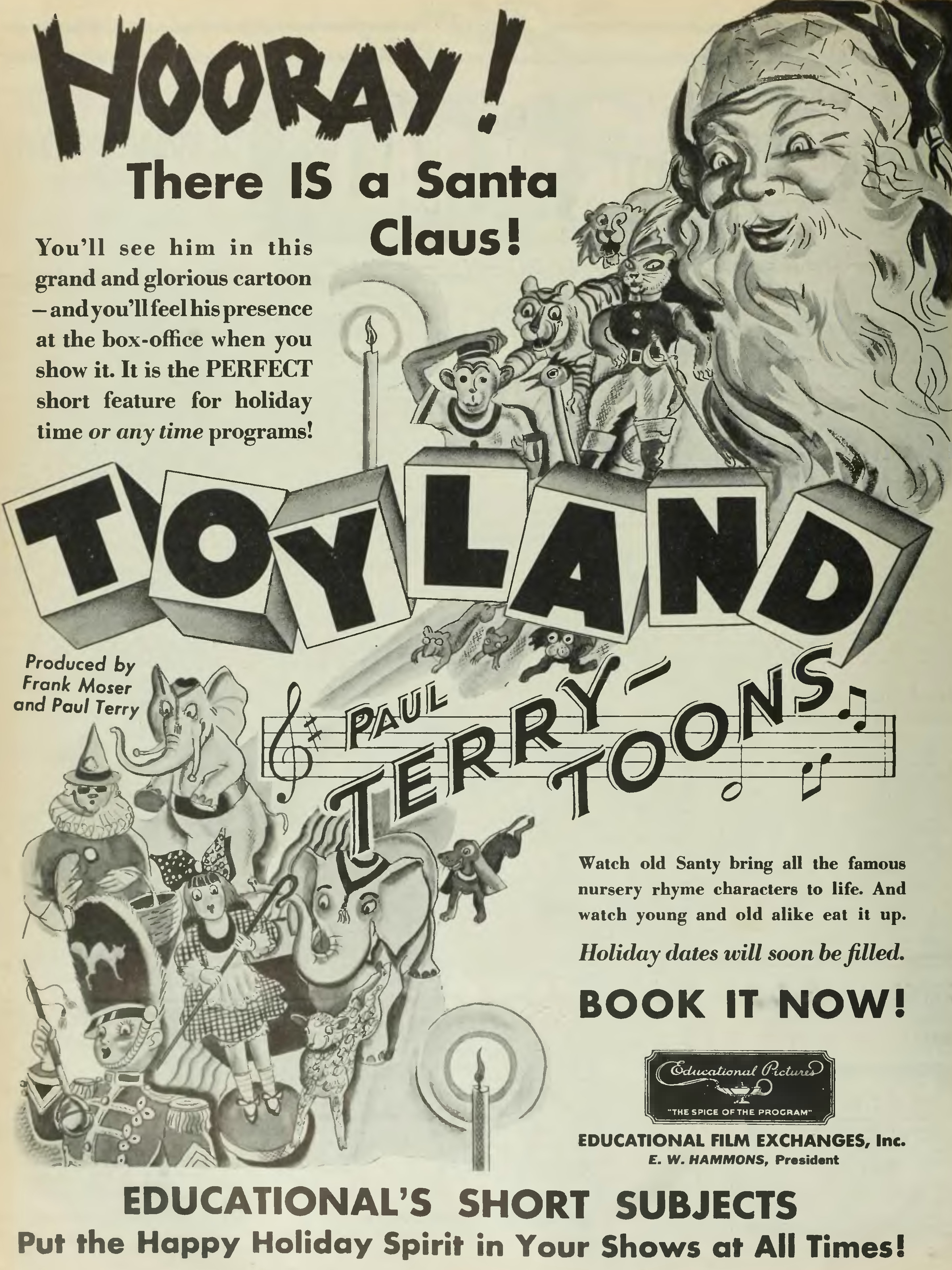
"Toyland" produced by Frank Moser and Paul Terry-Toons ad from The Film Daily, 1932

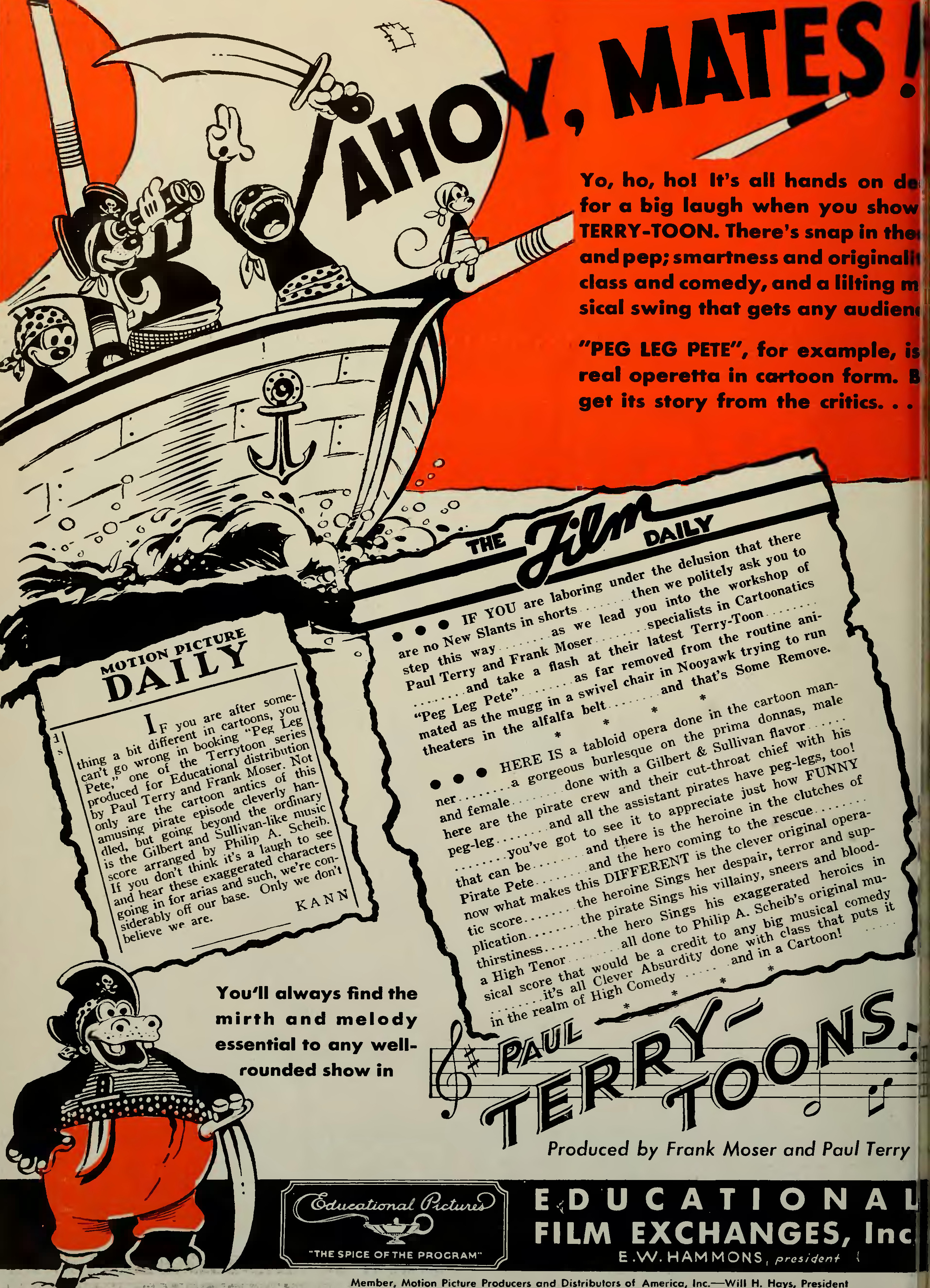
Paul Terry-toons ad in The Film Daily, 1932

Terrytoons' first distributor was Educational Pictures, specialists in short-subject comedies and novelties. Audio-Cinema in the early 1930s backed the production of Terrytoons and distributed the Educational library internationally, except in the United Kingdom and Ireland, where the library was distributed by Educational and Gaumont-British in partnership with the Ideal Film Company. Terrytoons also partnered with Warner Bros. Pictures to launch two advertisements for Flit, which were written by Dr. Seuss.

The Fox Film company then released Educational's shorts to theaters in the 1930s, giving the Terry cartoons wide exposure. Following the merger between Fox Film and 20th Century, the newly formed 20th Century Fox later withdrew its support from Educational Pictures in 1938 due to the latter's financial troubles, and afterwards, the company both backed and distributed Terrytoons. Farmer Al Falfa was Terry's most familiar character in the 1930s; Kiko the Kangaroo was spun off the Farmer Al Falfa series. Most of the other cartoons featured stock generic animal characters and designs, one of which was a scruffy dog with a black patch around one eye; Terry ultimately built a series around this character, now known as Puddy the Pup.

Paul Terry may have realized that Educational was in financial trouble because he found another lucrative outlet for his product. In 1938, he arranged to release his older cartoons through home-movie distributor Castle Films. Educational went out of business within the year, but 20th Century Fox continued to release Terrytoons to theaters for the next two decades. With a new emphasis on "star" characters, Terrytoons featured the adventures of Super Mouse (later renamed Mighty Mouse), the talking magpies Heckle and Jeckle, the silly and flamboyant Gandy Goose and his partner Sourpuss, the unusually unlucky Dinky Duck, the mischievous mouse Little Roquefort, and the Terry Bears.

Through much of its history, the studio was considered one of the lowest-quality houses in the field, to the point where Paul Terry noted, "Let Walt Disney be the Tiffany's of the business. I want to be the Woolworth's!" Terry's studio had the lowest budgets and was among the slowest to adapt to new technologies such as sound (in about 1930), Technicolor (in 1938), and more complex animation. While its graphic style remained remarkably static for decades, it actually followed the sound cartoon trend of the late 1920s and early 1930s very quickly. Music was entrusted to one man, Philip Scheib, but Terry's refusal to pay royalties for popular songs forced Scheib to compose his own original scores and use public domain music.

Prior to 1957, the studio's output was considered to be varying in quality due to their highly formulaic nature and low budgets. Terry's lack of oversight on quality control however, was taken advantage of by some of the artists; amongst them was animator Jim Tyer, who had considerably more experience at higher-budgeted studios and was able to get away with wildly-drawn sequences, which John Kricfalusi, who later worked on Mighty Mouse: The New Adventures, praised for elevating the overall quality of the studio's output. Despite this, Terrytoons was nominated three times for the Academy Award for Animated Short Film under his tenure: All Out for V in 1942, My Boy, Johnny in 1944, and Gypsy Life in 1945.

Paul Terry took pride in producing a new cartoon every other week, regardless of the quality of the films. Until 1957, screen credits were very sparse, listing only the writer (until 1950, solely John Foster; then Tom Morrison thereafter), director (Terry's three main directors were Connie Rasinski, Eddie Donnelly, and Mannie Davis), and musician (musical director Philip A. Scheib).

=== Changing hands ===
The studio was sold outright by the retiring Paul Terry to CBS in 1955, but 20th Century Fox continued distribution. The deal closed the following year, and it became a division of the CBS Films subsidiary. Later in 1957, CBS put it under the management of UPA alumnus Gene Deitch, who had to work with even lower budgets.

Deitch significantly shifted the studio's direction away from its roots and instead focused on a style more reminiscent of UPA's cartoons. His most notable work at the studio were the Tom Terrific cartoon segments for the Captain Kangaroo television show. He also discontinued the Mighty Mouse and Heckle and Jeckle cartoons to instead put focus on a number of new characters, such as Sidney the Elephant, Gaston Le Crayon, John Doormat, and Clint Clobber. One of Deitch's Sidney cartoons, "Sidney's Family Tree", was nominated for an Academy Award in 1958 for Best Animated Short, only to lose to Warner Bros.'s Looney Tunes short "Knighty Knight Bugs".

Bill Weiss soon took complete control of the studio and fired Deitch in 1959. Under his supervision, Heckle and Jeckle and Mighty Mouse went back into production. Besides the three core directors of the Terry era who were still involved as animators and directors, two Famous Studios stalwarts joined the crew, Dave Tendlar and Martin Taras. Other new theatrical cartoon series included Hector Heathcote, Luno, and Hashimoto-san. The studio also began producing the Deputy Dawg series for television in 1959. Another television production for the Captain Kangaroo show was "The Adventures of Lariat Sam", which was written in part by Gene Wood, who later became the announcer for several TV gameshows, including Family Feud. Phil Scheib continued as the studio's musical director through the mid-1960s, when he was replaced by Jim Timmens and Elliott Lawrence.

The best-known talent at Terrytoons in the 1960s was animator/director/producer Ralph Bakshi, who started his career in Terrytoons in the 1950s as an opaquer, but climbed the ranks and eventually helmed the Mighty Heroes series, as well as a series of cartoons starring his creation Sad Cat. Bakshi left Terrytoons in 1967 for Paramount's own cartoon studio, which closed its cartoon unit later that year. He went on to produce Mighty Mouse: The New Adventures for television in 1987, which was also produced by future The Ren & Stimpy Show creator John Kricfalusi.

=== Closure ===
As a result of the FCC banning TV networks from owning cable television and syndication of television programs, CBS created Viacom Enterprises to handle all network programs beyond TV production and network broadcasting. On July 4, 1971, Viacom Enterprises spun off from CBS; neither Viacom Enterprises nor CBS had any interest in Terrytoons. The Terrytoons film library was still regularly re-released to theaters by Fox. The studio's final short was an unsold TV pilot called Sally Sargent, about a 16-year-old girl who is a secret agent. Soon after Sally Sargent was completed, Viacom International ended their relationship with Fox and re-releases ceased. Terrytoons’ existence soon came to an end.

Art Bartsch, who kept the studio running after Bakshi left, soon died, as did Connie Rasinski and Bob Kuwahara, reducing the studio to a ghost studio with executive producer Bill Weiss and story supervisor Tom Morrison; Viacom kept the studio open until 1972. Weiss retired in September of that year, but was retained by Viacom as a studio consultant until his death in 1997. By November 1972, Viacom International announced that Terrytoons would shutter its New Rochelle facility and relocate to Viacom International's office in New York City. By December 29, Viacom sold the now-abandoned New Rochelle studio.

=== Post-history and Legacy ===
In two January 1973 interviews with Weiss and Morrison, Weiss believed that computer animation would be the destined future for animation, saying, "They’re now working on a way to produce animated work by computer", a notion that Morrison was vehemently against. Weiss also said that if the Terrytoons studio were to continue, it would have to open a new facility on the West Coast. No new studio ever opened, though, and any new cartoons were outsourced to other studios, instead.

In the late 1970s, Filmation Associates licensed the rights to make the new Mighty Mouse and Heckle & Jeckle series from Viacom International. The series The New Adventures of Mighty Mouse and Heckle & Jeckle aired from 1979 to 1980 on CBS.

Bakshi later produced Mighty Mouse: The New Adventures in 1987, which lasted for two seasons. Together, Bakshi and his friend John Kricfalusi inspired the staff to try to get as much Jim Tyer-style drawing in the show as possible. Tyer, a Terry animator known for his wildly outlandish style, became a strong influence on the artists of the Bakshi series, such as recognized writers, artists, and animators Bruce Timm, Doug Moench, Andrew Stanton, Rich Moore, Lynne Naylor, Jim Reardon, Tom Minton, and Bob Jaques.

Two attempts were made to revive the Terrytoon characters in the 1990s. John Kricfalusi pitched a revival to Paramount in the mid 1990s, but to no success. Later in 1999, animation historian Jerry Beck attempted to revive the Terrytoons characters as a pitch pilot to Nickelodeon under its in-house studio called Curbside. It would have been a parody of late-night talk shows with Heckle & Jeckle serving as hosts, along with Dinky Duck as their assistant, and would have featured new cartoons featuring Terrytoon characters such as Deputy Dawg, Sidney the Elephant, and Mighty Mouse. The pilot featured talented voices of Toby Huss and Bobcat Goldthwait as Heckle & Jeckle, Dee Bradley Baker as Mighty Mouse, Dinky Duck and Sidney the Elephant, Billy West as Deputy Dawg, Haley Joel Osment as Tom Terrific, and additional voices of West, Charlie Adler, Rob Paulsen, and Robert Taylor. Beck left the project early on after Nickelodeon secured the rights to the characters, and the pilot was never picked up, making it the only Terrytoons project that was never officially released as a full television series. Beck would later express dissatisfaction with the pilot due to its misunderstanding of Terry's characters. He later created the short "Hornswiggle" in 2008 as part of Random! Cartoons for Nicktoons, which was initially conceived as a Sidney the Elephant cartoon.

Between 2001 and 2002, the Terrytoons characters returned to television in original commercials for Brazilian blue cheese (for what is now America's Dairy Farmers) and fine wine. One such infamous commercial was the Mighty Mouse ad (entitled "Dining With Cheese") dining calmly on cheese in a restaurant, utterly unconcerned with a scene of chaos and terror visibly unfolding in the street outside. That said commercial was then pulled from airing following the September 11th attacks.

In 2004, a supposed live-action/animated hybrid Mighty Mouse film adaptation was announced for Nickelodeon Movies and Paramount Pictures with Steve Oedekerk of Omation Animation Studio to produce and direct, but was cancelled and has been in development hell since then. However, development later revived in April 2019 for Paramount Animation with Jon and Erich Hoeber to write the screenplay and both Karen Rosenfelt and Robert W. Cort to produce. It was later announced that in November 2024, Paramount Animation was associated with Maximum Effort, with its co-founder Ryan Reynolds as producer and Matt Lieberman as writer.

In 2025, MeTV Toons announced it would air all the classic Terrytoons cartoons starting on November 2, making their return to TV for the first time in decades. While some cartoons currently airing are from the previously re-edited TV prints, others are derived from original 35mm elements archived at Paramount, and complete with their original front-and-end titles. Some of these cartoons from the original 35mm format have been restored by Paramount, but the rest that were aired prior were left in low quality.

== Comic books ==
Terry-Toons Comics #61 (Oct. 1947). Cover artist unknown.

Among the many licensed Terrytoons products are comic books, mainly published throughout the 1940s and 1950s. The company's characters — including Mighty Mouse, Heckle and Jeckle, Dinky Duck, Gandy Goose, and Little Roquefort — were initially licensed to Timely, a predecessor of Marvel Comics, in 1942. St. John Publications took over the license from 1947 to 1956, Pines Comics published Terrytoons comics from 1956 to 1959, Dell Comics made an attempt from 1959 to 1962 (and again later from 1966 to 1967), and finally, Western Publishing published Mighty Mouse comics from 1962 to 1980.

The lead title, Terry-Toons Comics, was published by Timely from Oct. 1942–Aug. 1947. With issue #60 (Sept. 1947), publication of the title was taken over by St. John Publications, which published another 27 issues until issue #86 (May 1951). The series continued in 1951 (with duplicate issues #85–86) as Paul Terry's Comics, publishing another 41 issues until May 1955, when it was canceled with issue #125.

Timely launched the Mighty Mouse series in 1946. The first St. John Terrytoons comic was Mighty Mouse #5 (Aug. 1947), its numbering also taken over from the Timely run. That series eventually ran 71 issues with St. John, moving to Pines for 16 issues from Apr. 1956 to Aug. 1959, to Dell for 12 issues from Oct./Dec. 1959–July/Sept. 1962, and Western for 17 issues from Oct. 1962 to Jan. 1980 (with a hiatus from Sept. 1965 to Mar. 1979), finally ending with issue #172.

St. John's Terrytoons comics include the field's first 3-D comic book, Three Dimension Comics #1 (Sept. 1953 oversize format, Oct. 1953 standard-size reprint), featuring Mighty Mouse. According to Joe Kubert, co-creator with the brothers Norman Maurer and Leonard Maurer, it sold an exceptional 1.2 million copies at 25 cents apiece at a time when comics cost a dime.

Dell Comics published eight issues of a New Terrytoons title from June/Aug. 1960 to March/May 1962.

=== Terrytoons comic-book titles ===
- Adventures of Mighty Mouse (18 issues, November 1951 – May 1955) — St. John
- Dinky Duck (19 issues, November 1951 – Summer 1958) — launched by St. John, continued by Pines
- Gandy Goose (4 issues, March 1953 – November 1953) – St. John
- Heckle and Jeckle (32 issues, October 1951 – June 1959) — launched by St. John, continued by Pines
- Heckle and Jeckle (4 issues, November 1962 – August 1963) — Western Publishing
- Heckle and Jeckle (3 issues, May 1966 – 1967) — Dell
- Little Roquefort Comics (10 issues, June 1952 – Summer 1958) — launched by St. John, continued by Pines
- Mighty Mouse / Paul Terry's Mighty Mouse Comics (172 issues, Fall 1946 – January 1980) — launched by Timely; continued by St. John, Pines, Dell, and Western
- Mighty Mouse Album (3 issues, October – December 1952) — St. John
- New Terrytoons (8 issues, June/August 1960 – March/May 1962) — Dell
- Terry Bears Comics / Terrytoons, the Terry Bears (4 issues, June 1952 – Summer 1958) — launched by St. John, continued by Pines
- Terry-Toons Comics / Paul Terry's Comics (125 issues, Oct. 1942 – May 1955) — launched by Timely Comics, continued by St. John
- TerryToons Comics (9 issues, June 1952 – November 1953) — St. John; separate from Terry-Toons Comics / Paul Terry's Comics

== Filmography ==
See List of Terrytoons animated shorts for complete filmography

=== Theatrical short film series ===
- Aesop's Fables (1945–1960)
- Astronut (1964–1973)
- Clint Clobber (1957–1959)
- Deputy Dawg (1960–1975)
- Dimwit (1953–1959)
- Dingbat (1948 - 1950)
- Dinky Duck (1939–1957)
- Duckwood (1964)
- Fanny Zilch (1933-1938)
- Farmer Al Falfa (1915–1956)
- Foofle (1959–1960)
- Gandy Goose (1938–1955)
- Gaston Le Crayon (1957–1959)
- Good Deed Daily (1955–1956)
- Half Pint (1950 - 1951)
- Hashimoto (1959–1963)
- Heckle and Jeckle (1946–1966)
- Hector Heathcote (1959–1974)
- James Hound (1966–1967)
- John Doormat (1957–1959)
- Kiko the Kangaroo (1936–1937)
- Little Roquefort (1950–1955)
- Luno the White Stallion (1963–1975)
- Martian Moochers (1966)
- Mighty Mouse (1942–1961)
- Nancy (1942)
- Possible Possum (1965–1974)
- Puddy the Pup (1935–1942)
- Sad Cat (1965–1968)
- Sidney the Elephant (1958–1963)
- The Terry Bears (1951–1955)

=== TV series ===
- Barker Bill's Cartoon Show (1953–1956)
- Mighty Mouse Playhouse (1955–1967)
- CBS Cartoon Theatre (1956)
- The Heckle and Jeckle Show (1956)
- Tom Terrific (1957)
- Easy Winners (1958) (unaired pilot)
- The Deputy Dawg Show (1959–1964)
- The Adventures of Lariat Sam (1962)
- The Hector Heathcote Show (1963)
- The Astronut Show (1965)
- Mighty Mouse, & The Mighty Heroes (1966–1967)
- Sally Sargent (1968) (pilot)

== Terrytoons, Inc. staff: (1929–1972) ==
- Joseph Barbera
- Ralph Bakshi
- Gene Deitch
- Connie Rasinski
- Paul Terry
- William Weiss
- John Foster

== Bibliography ==
- Hamonic, W. Gerald (2018). Terrytoons: The Story of Paul Terry and His Classic Cartoon Factory. John Libbey Publishing Ltd. ISBN 978-0861967292.
