= Deputy Dawg =

- Deputy Dawg
- Created by: Larz Bourne
- Starring: Dayton Allen
- Country of origin: United States
- No. of episodes: 104

Production
- Executive producer: Bill Weiss
- Running time: 4–6 minutes
- Production company: Terrytoons

Original release
- Network: CBS
- Release: January 1, 1960 – December 31, 1964

Deputy Dawg is a Terrytoons cartoon character, featured in the animated television series of the same name that aired from 1960 to 1964.

== Background ==
The character of Deputy Dawg originated in 1959 as part of a projected series entitled Possible Possum, intended as a component of the Captain Kangaroo Show. Larz Bourne came up with the series concept and drew the first storyboards. Midway through production, the project was overhauled as a standalone series; Deputy Dawg became the star, and "Possible" was rechristened Muskie Muskrat, to avoid comparisons with Walt Kelly's comic strip character Pogo Possum. A later, less Kelly-inspired Terrytoons character would eventually take the Possible Possum name.

The Deputy Dawg Show first ran weekly from January 1, 1960 to December 31, 1964. Each episode has a Deputy Dawg cartoon, followed by Sidney the Elephant. The British television debut came on BBC Television on August 31, 1963.

The cartoons are between four and six minutes long, and were packaged three at a time and shown as a half-hour program. The show was produced by CBS and was the professional animation debut of Ralph Bakshi (as animator) of adult animation fame.

The cartoons originally featured Deputy Dawg, an anthropomorphic dog, as a deputy sheriff in Florida, although as the episodes progressed, the location changed to Mississippi, and later to Tennessee. The other main characters are the "varmints" Muskie Muskrat, Ty Coon, Vincent van Gopher, and Pig Newton, as well as Dawg's boss the Sheriff and his wife Mrs. Deputy. A wilder addition to the cast was the "space varmint" Astronut, a mischievous alien visitor who was later given his own spin-off show.

Deputy Dawg was voiced by Dayton Allen, a prolific voice actor who voiced many Terrytoons characters in television and theatrical shorts in the 1950s and 1960s.

Much of the comedy in the cartoons is sight gag/action-based, with additional humor provided by comical dialects and stereotypical southern characteristics. Many storylines involve Deputy Dawg battling with peculiar locals and trying to please the Sheriff, as well as protecting his produce from Muskie and Vince. However, most of Muskie's and Vince's crimes are not taken very seriously, enabling Deputy Dawg to pal around with them when they are not causing trouble. The trio often engage in their favorite pastime, fishing for catfish.

Musical direction was by Terrytoons standby Philip A. Scheib, who at the time had recently worked on the Oscar-nominated Terrytoons shorts Sidney's Family Tree (1958) and The Juggler of Our Lady (1958). The Deputy Dawg musical accompaniment often features a distinctive bass harmonica.

Deputy Dawg later appeared in episodes of the 1987 series Mighty Mouse: The New Adventures.

Deputy Dawg also appeared in the 1999 pilot Curbside.

== Home video ==
Children's Video Library issued "Terrytoons Good Guys" compilation VHS tapes in 1985 which included one Deputy Dawg cartoon per tape.

Video Treasures issued five "Deputy Dawg" VHS tapes in 1989. The tape catalogue numbers are listed below for the titles released.

== Episode guide ==
=== Season 1 (1960) ===
| No. Overall | No. in season | Title | Directed by | Story by | Date | Prod. code |
|---|---|---|---|---|---|---|
| 1 | | The Yoke's On You | Dave Tendlar | Larz Bourne | 1960 | 657 |
| 2 | | Space Varmint | Connie Rasinski | Larz Bourne | 1960 | 659 |
| 3 | | Shotgun Shambles | Dave Tendlar | Larz Bourne | 1960 | 660 |
| 4 | | Seize You Later, Alligator | Dave Tendlar | Larz Bourne | 1960 | 663 |
| 5 | | Li'l Whooper | Dave Tendlar | Larz Bourne | 1960 | 666 |
| 6 | | Welcome, Mischa Mouse | Martin Taras | Larz Bourne | 1960 | 672 |
| 7 | | Cotton-Pickin' Picnic | Connie Rasinski | Eli Bauer | 1960 | 673 |
| 8 | | Henhouse Hassle | Mannie Davis | Larz Bourne | 1960 | 674 |
| 9 | | Law and Disorder | Dave Tendlar | Bob Kuwahara | 1960 | 675 |
| 10 | | Rabid Rebel | Mannie Davis | Larz Bourne | 1960 | 676 |
| 11 | | Friend Fox | Dave Tendlar | Eli Bauer | 1960 | 677 |
| 12 | | Deputy Dawg's Nephew | Mannie Davis | Bob Kuwahara | 1960 | 683 |
| 13 | | Dog-Gone Catfish | Connie Rasinski | Larz Bourne | 1960 | 684 |
| 14 | | National Spoof Day | Mannie Davis | Eli Bauer | 1960 | 685 |
| 15 | | Aig Plant | Dave Tendlar | Larz Bourne | 1960 | 691 |
| 16 | | Creek Mud Monster | Connie Rasinski | Eli Bauer | 1960 | 693 |
| 17 | | Duped Deputy | Mannie Davis | Al Bertino & Dick Kinney | 1960 | 694 |
| 18 | | Home Cookin' | Dave Tendlar | Larz Bourne | 1960 | 695 |
| 19 | | Penguin Panic | Mannie Davis | Bob Kuwahara | 1960 | 697 |
| 20 | | People's Choice | Connie Rasinski | Al Bertino & Dick Kinney | 1960 | 698 |
| 21 | | Kin Folk | Dave Tendlar | Al Bertino & Dick Kinney | 1960 | 700 |
| 22 | | Lynx, th' Jinx | Mannie Davis | Larz Bourne | 1960 | 701 |
| 23 | | The Bird Burglar | Dave Tendlar | Kin Platt | 1960 | 703 |
| 24 | | Watermelon Watcher | Connie Rasinski | Larz Bourne | 1960 | 704 |
| 25 | | Dragon, My Foot | Mannie Davis | Eli Bauer | 1960 | 705 |
| 26 | | Star for a Day | Connie Rasinski | Al Bertino & Dick Kinney | 1960 | 706 |

=== Season 2 (1961–1962) ===
| No. Overall | No. in season | Title | Directed by | Story by | Date | Prod. code |
|---|---|---|---|---|---|---|
| 27 | 1 | Th' Two Inch Inchworm | Connie Rasinski | Larz Bourne | 1961 | 731 |
| 28 | 2 | Nobody's Ghost | Dave Tendlar | Larz Bourne | 1961 | 732 |
| 29 | 3 | Honey Tree | Art Bartsch | Larz Bourne | 1961 | 733 |
| 30 | 4 | Where There's Smoke | Bob Kuwahara | Larz Bourne | 1961 | 734 |
| 31 | 5 | Oil Tycoons | Tom Golden | Larz Bourne | 1961 | 735 |
| 32 | 6 | Rebel Trouble | Dave Tendlar | Larz Bourne | 1961 | 736 |
| 33 | 7 | Big Chief No Treaty | Bob Kuwahara | Larz Bourne | 1961 | 737 |
| 34 | 8 | Beaver Battle | Dave Tendlar | Larz Bourne | 1961 | 738 |
| 35 | 9 | Ship Aha Ha | Bob Kuwahara | Larz Bourne | 1961 | 739 |
| 36 | 10 | The Fragrant Vagrant | Tom Golden | Larz Bourne | 1961 | 740 |
| 37 | 11 | Noise Annoys | Connie Rasinski | Larz Bourne | 1961 | 741 |
| 38 | 12 | Tennessee Walkin' Horse | Bob Kuwahara | Larz Bourne | 1961 | 742 |
| 39 | 13 | Peanut Pilferer | Bill Tytla | Larz Bourne | 1961 | 743 |
| 40 | 14 | Mr. Moose | Bob Kuwahara | Larz Bourne | 1961 | 744 |
| 41 | 15 | National Lazy Day | Bob Kuwahara | Larz Bourne | 1961 | 745 |
| 42 | 16 | Little Red Fool House | Dave Tendlar | Larz Bourne | 1962 | 746 |
| 43 | 17 | Astronut | Connie Rasinski | Larz Bourne | 1962 | 747 |
| 44 | 18 | Echo Park | Dave Tendlar | Larz Bourne | 1962 | 748 |
| 45 | 19 | Physical Fatness | Bob Kuwahara | Larz Bourne | 1962 | 749 |
| 46 | 20 | Corn Cribber | Dave Tendlar | Larz Bourne | 1962 | 750 |
| 47 | 21 | Herman the Hermit | Connie Rasinski | Larz Bourne | 1962 | 751 |
| 48 | 22 | Heat Wave | Dave Tendlar | Larz Bourne | 1962 | 752 |
| 49 | 23 | Long Island Duckling | Connie Rasinski | Larz Bourne | 1962 | 753 |
| 50 | 24 | Tents Moments | Bill Tytla | Larz Bourne | 1962 | 754 |
| 51 | 25 | Dangnabit, Rabbit | Dave Tendlar | Larz Bourne | 1962 | 755 |
| 52 | 26 | Tourist Tirade | Dave Tendlar | Larz Bourne | 1962 | 756 |

=== Season 3 (1963–1964) ===
| No. Overall | No. in season | Title | Directed by | Story by | Animator | Date | Prod. code |
|---|---|---|---|---|---|---|---|
| 53 | 1 | Orbit a Little Bit | Bob Kuwahara | Larz Bourne | Cosmo Anzilotti | 1963 | 768 |
| 54 | 2 | Dry Spell | Dave Tendlar | Larz Bourne | Dave Tendlar | 1963 | 769 |
| 55 | 3 | Terrific Traffic | Bob Kuwahara | Larz Bourne | Cosmo Anzilotti | 1963 | 772 |
| 56 | 4 | Safe an' Insane 4th | Bob Kuwahara | Larz Bourne | Ralph Bakshi | 1963 | 773 |
| 57 | 5 | Lowman Lawman | Bob Kuwahara | Larz Bourne | Ralph Bakshi | 1963 | 775 |
| 58 | 6 | Open Wide | Dave Tendlar | Larz Bourne | Dave Tendlar | 1963 | 786 |
| 59 | 7 | The Catfish Poachin' Pelican | Bob Kuwahara | Larz Bourne | Mannie Davis | 1963 | 787 |
| 60 | 8 | The Milkweed from Space | Dave Tendlar | Larz Bourne | Dave Tendlar | 1963 | 788 |
| 61 | 9 | Bad Luck Day | Bob Kuwahara | Larz Bourne | Cosmo Anzilotti | 1963 | 789 |
| 62 | 10 | Royal Southern Dismounted Police | Bob Kuwahara | Larz Bourne | Cosmo Anzilotti | 1963 | 790 |
| 63 | 11 | Stuck Duck | Bob Kuwahara | Larz Bourne | Ralph Bakshi | 1963 | 792 |
| 64 | 12 | Go-Go Gorilla | Dave Tendlar | Larz Bourne | Dave Tendlar | 1963 | 793 |
| 65 | 13 | Grandpa Law | Bob Kuwahara | Larz Bourne | Mannie Davis | 1963 | 794 |
| 66 | 14 | Champion Whopper Teller | Art Bartsch | Larz Bourne | Art Bartsch | 1963 | 795 |
| 67 | 15 | Daddy Frog Legs | Bob Kuwahara | Larz Bourne | Cosmo Anzilotti | 1963 | 796 |
| 68 | 16 | Science Friction | Bob Kuwahara | Larz Bourne | Ralph Bakshi | 1963 | 797 |
| 69 | 17 | On the Lam with Ham | Connie Rasinski | Larz Bourne | Connie Rasinski | 1963 | 798 |
| 70 | 18 | Just Ghost T' Show You | Dave Tendlar | Larz Bourne | Dave Tendlar | 1963 | 799 |
| 71 | 19 | Mama Magnolia's Pecan Pies | Bob Kuwahara | Larz Bourne | Mannie Davis | 1963 | 800 |
| 72 | 20 | Lawman to the Rescue | Bob Kuwahara | Larz Bourne | Cosmo Anzilotti | 1963 | 801 |
| 73 | 21 | Peach Pluckin' Kangaroo | Bob Kuwahara | Larz Bourne | Ralph Bakshi | 1963 | 802 |
| 74 | 22 | The Neverglades | Bob Kuwahara | Larz Bourne | Cosmo Anzilotti | 1963 | 803 |
| 75 | 23 | Feud for Thought | Bob Kuwahara | Kin Platt | Mannie Davis | 1964 | 804 |
| 76 | 24 | The Poster Caper | Bob Kuwahara | Larz Bourne | Mannie Davis | 1964 | 805 |
| 77 | 25 | Diamonds in the Rough | Ralph Bakshi | Larz Bourne | Ralph Bakshi | 1964 | 806 |
| 78 | 26 | Double Barreled Boom-Boom | Art Bartsch | Larz Bourne | Art Davis | 1964 | 807 |
| 79 | 27 | Spare That Tree | Cosmo Anzilotti | Kin Platt | Cosmo Anzilotti | 1964 | 808 |
| 80 | 28 | The Pig Rustler | Bob Kuwahara | Larz Bourne | Bard Wiggenhorn | 1964 | 809 |
| 81 | 29 | Chicken Bull | Bob Kuwahara | Larz Bourne | Bard Wiggenhorn | 1964 | 810 |
| 82 | 30 | Hex Marks the Spot | Bob Kuwahara | Kin Platt | Cosmo Anzilotti | 1964 | 811 |
| 83 | 31 | Something to Crow About | Cosmo Anzilotti | Larz Bourne | Cosmo Anzilotti | 1964 | 812 |
| 84 | 32 | Catfish Crisis | Art Bartsch | Larz Bourne | Alan Zaslove | 1964 | 813 |
| 85 | 33 | Show Biz Whiz | Ralph Bakshi | Jack Mercer | Ralph Bakshi | 1964 | 814 |
| 86 | 34 | Save Ol' Piney | Ralph Bakshi | Larz Bourne | Ralph Bakshi | 1964 | 815 |
| 87 | 35 | Pinch Hittin' for a Pigeon | Art Bartsch | Larz Bourne | Alan Zaslove | 1964 | 816 |
| 88 | 36 | Mountain Melvin Meets Hairy Harry | Bob Kuwahara | Larz Bourne | Mannie Davis | 1964 | 817 |
| 89 | 37 | Protestin' Pilot | Bob Kuwahara | Larz Bourne | Bard Wiggenhorn | 1964 | 818 |
| 90 | 38 | Mule-itary Maneuvers | Art Bartsch | Jack Mercer | John Gentilella | 1964 | 819 |
| 91 | 39 | Millionaire Deputy | Connie Rasinski | Kin Platt | Connie Rasinski | 1964 | 820 |
| 92 | 40 | All Tuckered Out | Bob Kuwahara | Larz Bourne | Mannie Davis | 1964 | 821 |
| 93 | 41 | Th' Hungry Astronut | Dave Tendlar | Larz Bourne | Dave Tendlar | 1964 | 822 |
| 94 | 42 | Museum of th' South | Bob Kuwahara | Larz Bourne | Bard Wiggenhorn | 1964 | 823 |
| 95 | 43 | Scare Cure | Bob Kuwahara | Larz Bourne | Ralph Bakshi | 1964 | 824 |
| 96 | 44 | The Great Grain Robbery | Connie Rasinski | Larz Bourne | Connie Rasinski | 1964 | 825 |
| 97 | 45 | Corn Pone Limited | Art Bartsch | Larz Bourne | John Gentilella | 1964 | 826 |
| 98 | 46 | Space Invitation | Bob Kuwahara | Larz Bourne | Cosmo Anzilotti | 1964 | 827 |
| 99 | 47 | You're Fired and I'm Tired | Bob Kuwahara | Larz Bourne | Mannie Davis | 1964 | 828 |
| 100 | 48 | The Pink Flamingo | Art Bartsch | Larz Bourne | Mannie Davis | 1964 | 829 |
| 101 | 49 | Imperfect Crime | Art Bartsch | Bernie Kahn | John Gentilella | 1964 | 830 |
| 102 | 50 | Obnoxious Obie | Bob Kuwahara | Larz Bourne | Ralph Bakshi | 1964 | 831 |
| 103 | 51 | Elusive Louie | Bob Kuwahara | Larz Bourne | Cosmo Anzilotti | 1964 | 832 |
| 104 | 52 | The Governor's Guide | Art Bartsch | Larz Bourne | John Gentilella | 1964 | 833 |

== Credits ==
- Direction: Art Bartsch, Bob Kuwahara, Connie Rasinski, Dave Tendlar, Mannie Davis, Ralph Bakshi
- Story supervisor: Tom Morrison
- Stories: Larz Bourne, Eli Bauer, Bob Kuwahara, Al Bertino, Dick Kinney
- Animation: Cosmo Anzilotti, Ralph Bakshi, Doug Crane, Mannie Davis, Eddie Donnelly, Dick Hall, John Gentilella, Larry Silverman
- Design and layout supervisor: Art Bartsch
- Design and layout: Martin Strudler, John Zago
- Backgrounds: Bill Focht, Bill Hilliker
- Music: Phil Scheib
- Voices: Dayton Allen
- Photography: George Davis, Ted Moskowitz, Joseph Rasinski
- Editing: George McAvoy, Jack MacConnell
- Production manager: Frank Schudde
- Executive producer: Bill Weiss

== See also ==
- The Astronut Show
