= Connie Rasinski =

American film director

- Born: Constantine Rasinski; January 28, 1907; Torrington, Connecticut
- Died: October 13, 1965 (aged 58); Larchmont, New York
- Known for: Animation, illustration

J. Conrad "Connie" Rasinski (January 28, 1907 in Torrington, Connecticut – October 13, 1965 in Larchmont, New York) was an animation director who did the 1952 animated short "Hansel and Gretel" among others. Rasinski's "House of Hashimoto" was in competition at the 1961 Cannes Film Festival.

== Biography ==
Connie Rasinski was born Constantine Rasinski on January 28, 1907, in Torrington, Connecticut.

As a young man Rasinski studied with Norman Rockwell at the Art Students League of New York. After a variety of jobs, Rasinski decided to become an animator. In 1930 he became an inker for Terrytoons. In 1937 he became a director at Terrytoons.

His filmography includes Mighty Mouse, Heckle and Jeckle, Gandy Goose, Deputy Dawg, Clint Clobber, Terry Bears, and Little Roquefort.

Rasinski died in Larchmont, New York on October 13, 1965.
