= Paul Terry (cartoonist) =

American animator (1887–1971)

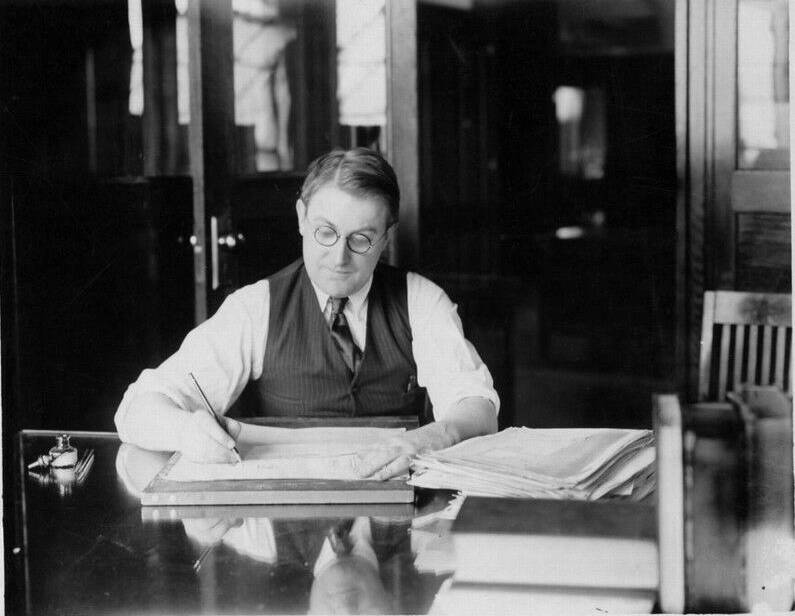
- Paul Terry working at Pathe Pictures, circa 1920s
- Born: Paul Houlton Terry; February 19, 1887; San Mateo, California, U.S.
- Died: October 25, 1971 (aged 84); New York City, U.S.
- Occupations: Cartoonist; screenwriter; film director; film producer
- Years active: 1915–1955
- Spouse: Irma Terry (m. 1933; died 1969)
- Children: Patricia Terry-Leahy
- Relatives: Alex Anderson (nephew)

Paul Houlton Terry (February 19, 1887 – October 25, 1971) was an American cartoonist, animator, screenwriter, film director and producer. He produced over 1,300 cartoons between 1915 and 1955 including the many Terrytoons cartoons. His studio's most famous character is Mighty Mouse, and also created Heckle and Jeckle, Gandy Goose and Dinky Duck.

== Early life ==
Born in California to Joseph and Minnie Perron, Terry's parents moved to San Francisco where he spent most of his early life. In 1904 he began working as a news photographer and drawing cartoons for newspapers such as the San Francisco Chronicle, San Francisco Call, and the San Francisco Examiner. He contributed to a weekly comic strip about a dog titled "Alonzo" for the San Francisco Call in 1909, before it was taken over by his brother John a year later. He later transferred to the New York Press in 1910, a newspaper in New York City.

In 1914, Terry became interested in animation after seeing Winsor McCay's Gertie the Dinosaur. While still working for the newspaper, he made his first film, Little Herman, which he completed in four months in his living room. He struggled to sell the film to distributors until he met Edwin Thanhouser, executive of the Thanhouser film company of New Rochelle, New York, in 1915. Thanhouser organized a successful test screening with children and agreed to distribute the film.

Later that year, he completed his second film, Down on the Phoney Farm, which is notable for being the first appearance of Farmer Al Falfa.

In 1916, he began working at Bray Productions, directing and producing a series of eleven Farmer Al Falfa films. Before the end of the year, Terry left Bray, taking the rights to Farmer Al Falfa with him.

== Paul Terry Productions ==
In 1917, Terry formed his own production company, Paul Terry Productions, and produced nine more animated films, including one Farmer Al Falfa film. Terry closed his studio to join the United States Army and fought in World War I. After he was discharged from the army in 1919, he briefly supervised cartoons for Paramount Magazine until he eventually made a deal in 1920 to make the Aesop's Fables series to screenwriter Howard Estabrook.

== Fables Pictures ==
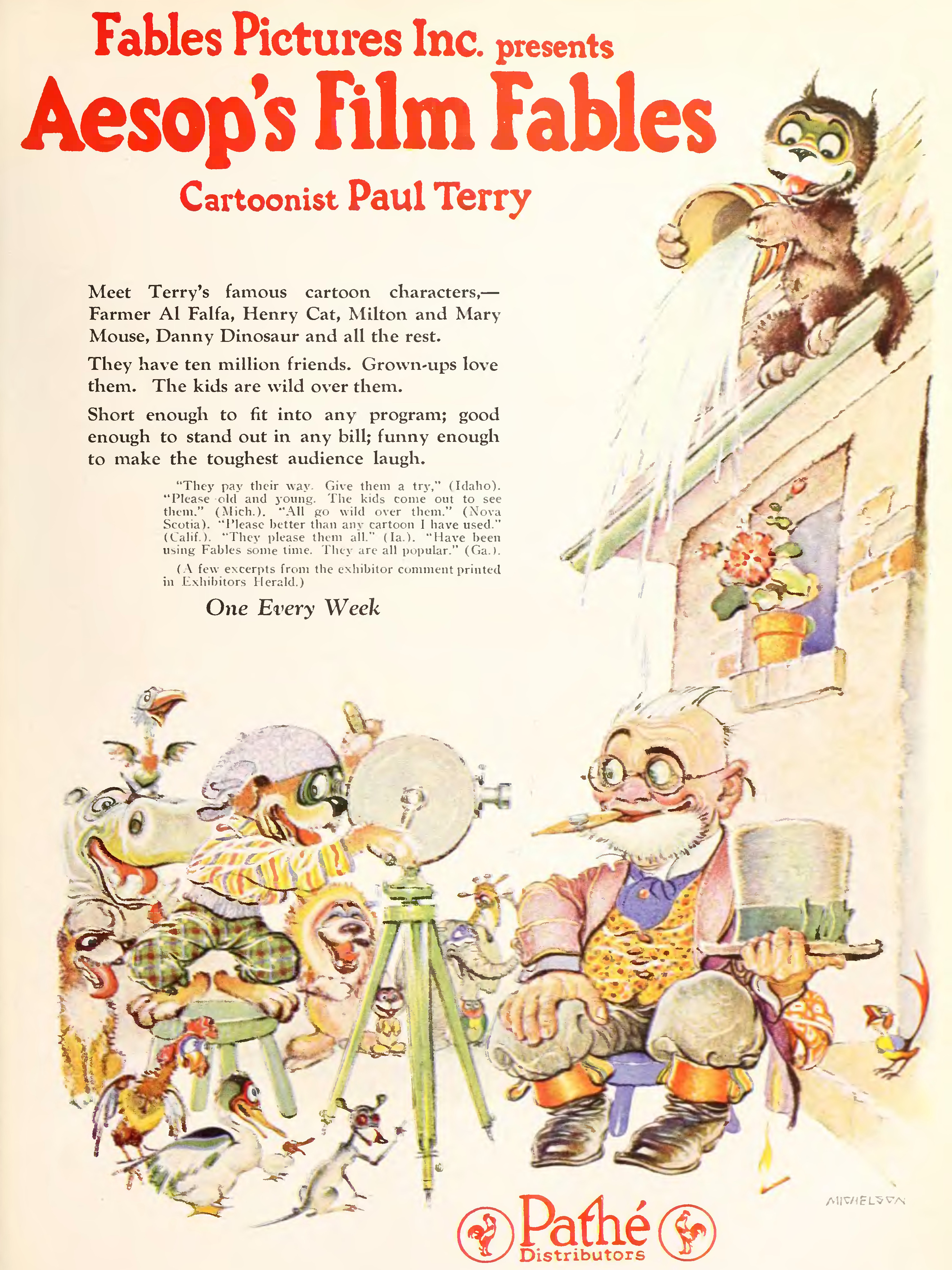
Ad for Terry's Aesop's Film Fables in Motion Picture News, 1926

One of the earliest surviving Aesop's Fables, albeit in a destructed fragment

In 1920, Terry entered into a partnership with Amedee J. Van Beuren, and founded Fables Pictures. The studio signed a contract with Pathé Pictures on June 7, 1921. The first picture was released on June 19 on that same year. During this time, Terry began producing a series of Aesop's Film Fables as well as new Farmer Al Falfa films under that banner. Terry experimented with the sound process in a Fable Cartoon called Dinner Time after pressure from Van Beuren, released in September 1928, two months before Walt Disney's Steamboat Willie was released in November 1928.

Terry's partnership with Van Beuren lasted until 1929, when Terry and Van Beuren disagreed over the switch to producing films with sound. Terry started up the Terrytoons studio in New York, where he later moved the studio to New Rochelle in 1932. The Thanhouser film company, purchasers of Terry's first films, were also located there. Van Beuren retained "Fables Pictures" and renamed it "Van Beuren Studios".

== Terrytoons ==
Caviar, 1930, the first Terrytoon.

Terry's Terrytoons produced a large number of animated films, including Gandy Goose, Mighty Mouse, Heckle and Jeckle, and many other lesser-known characters. Theatrical distribution was at first through Educational Pictures and then, after it was acquired in 1937, through 20th Century Fox.

Terry was quick to adopt techniques that simplified the animation process, but he resisted "improvements" that complicated production. He was one of the first to make use of "cel animation", including animation of separate body parts. His studio was slow to switch to synchronized sound tracks and to color. He managed to keep his studio profitable while others went out of business. Terry was once quoted as saying, "Walt Disney is the Tiffany's of the business, and I am the Woolworth's."

== Later years ==
Terry became the first major cartoon producer to package his old films for television. In 1955, Terry sold his animation studio and film library to CBS for $5 million and retired. In 1956, Gene Deitch was appointed as the creative supervisor of the studio, who replaced the old characters with new ones such as Clint Clobber and John Doormat.

Deitch departed after three years. After Deitch's departure, Mighty Mouse and Heckle & Jeckle returned, as well as new characters such as Deputy Dawg. CBS made the Terrytoons library of films a mainstay of its Saturday morning programming and continued operating the studio, making both new theatrical films and series for television until the late 1960s.

Terry died on October 25, 1971, aged 84, at the Memorial Hospital for Cancer and Allied Diseases in New York, New York. In Terry's later life, his home was the Westchester Country Club in Rye, New York. During those years he lived a leisurely retirement, painting and sculpting in his home until his death. His nephew, Alex Anderson, was also an animator. Terry's wife Irma preceded him in death in 1969 at age 70. Daughter Patricia Terry-Leahy, who survives them, has her father's cremated remains in her North Carolina home.
