= Farmer Al Falfa filmography =

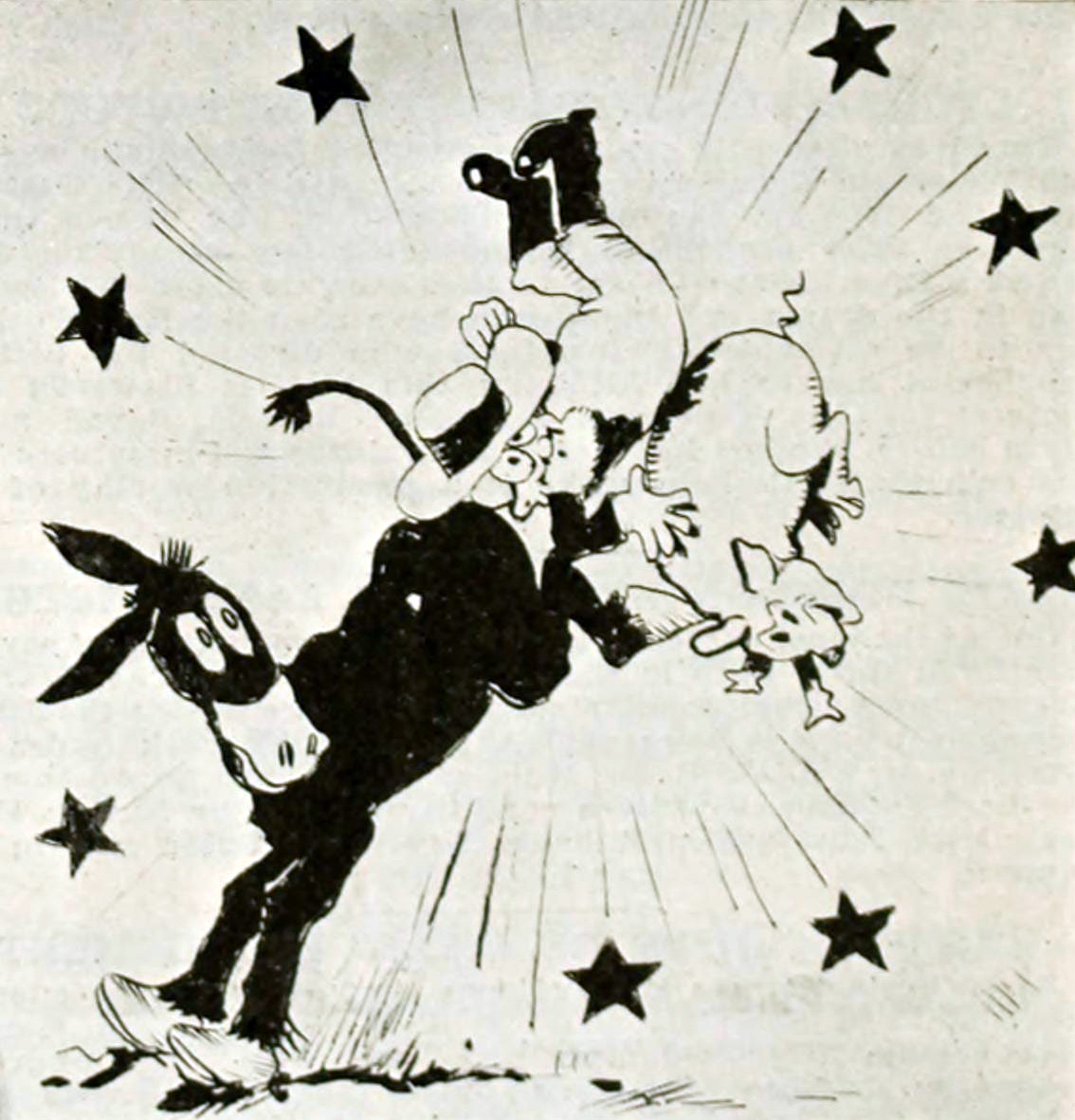
Farmer Al Falfa and his Tentless Circus (1916)

The following is a list of theatrical short films featuring the cartoon character Farmer Al Falfa. Each set of films here is separated by studio.

== Thanhouser Corporation ==
#	Title	Release date	Director	Film	Notes
1	Down on the Phoney Farm	October 12, 1915	Paul Terry		First appearance of Farmer Al Falfa in a theatrical cartoon. Only Farmer Al Falfa theatrical cartoon made by Thanhouser Corporation.

== Bray Studios ==
#	Title	Release date	Director	Film	Notes
2	Farmer Al Falfa's Catastrophe	February 3, 1916	Paul Terry	Lost film	First Farmer Al Falfa theatrical cartoon made by Bray Studios.
3	Farmer Al Falfa Invents a New Kite	March 12, 1916	Paul Terry	Lost film	
4	Farmer Al Falfa's Scientific Diary	April 14, 1916	Paul Terry	Lost film	
5	Farmer Al Falfa and his Tentless Circus	June 3, 1916	Paul Terry	Lost film	
6	Farmer Al Falfa's Watermelon Patch	June 29, 1916	Paul Terry	Lost film	
7	Farmer Al Falfa's Egg-Citement	August 4, 1916	Paul Terry	Lost film	
8	Farmer Al Falfa's Revenge	August 25, 1916	Paul Terry		
9	Farmer Al Falfa's Wolfhound	September 16, 1916	Paul Terry	Lost film	
10	Farmer Al Falfa Sees New York	October 9, 1916	Paul Terry		
11	Farmer Al Falfa's Prune Plantation	November 3, 1916	Paul Terry	Lost film	
12	Farmer Al Falfa's Blind Pig	December 1, 1916	Paul Terry	Cartoon link	Final Farmer Al Falfa theatrical cartoon made by Bray Studios.

== Edison/Conquest Pictures ==
#	Title	Release date	Director	Film	Notes
13	Farmer Al Falfa's Wayward Pup	May 7, 1917	Paul Terry		Only Farmer Al Falfa theatrical cartoon made by Edison/Conquest Pictures.

== A. Kay Co. ==
#	Title	Release date	Director	Film	Notes
14	Some Barrier	June 1917	Paul Terry	Lost film	First Farmer Al Falfa theatrical cartoon made by A. Kay Co.
15	His Trial	July 1917	Paul Terry	Lost film	Final Farmer Al Falfa theatrical cartoon made by A. Kay Co.

== Paramount Pictures ==
#	Title	Release date	Director	Film	Notes
16	The Bone of Contention	March 14, 1920	Paul Terry	Lost film	Only Farmer Al Falfa theatrical cartoon made by Paramount Pictures.

== Fables Pictures ==
#	Title	Release date	Reissue title
17	The Fable of the Goose That Laid the Golden Egg	June 19, 1921	
18	The Fable of Venus and the Cat	October 9, 1921	All in a Day (Commonwealth TV)
19	The Miller and His Donkey	January 29, 1922	Donkey Tricks (Commonwealth TV)
20	The Dog and the Thief	February 19, 1922	
21	The Farmer and the Ostrich	March 19, 1922	
22	The Fable of the Lion and the Mouse	April 2, 1922	
23	The Boy and the Dog	April 30, 1922	
24	The Model Dairy	May 14, 1922	
25	The Farmer and His Cat	June 18, 1922	
26	Crime in a Big City	July 9, 1922	
27	The Farmer and the Mice	August 20, 1922	
28	The Fable of Fearless Fido	September 3, 1922	
29	The Two Slick Traders	September 24, 1922	Farmer Gray in On the Farm/Farmer Gray Makes a Deal (?)
30	The Fable of the Big Flood	October 1, 1922	
31	The Fable of Two of a Trade	October 15, 1922	Fisherman's Dream (Commonwealth TV)
32	The Fable of the Enchanted Fiddle	November 12, 1922	
33	The Fable of Friday the 13th	December 3, 1922	
34	The Fable of the Man Who Laughed	December 10, 1922	
35	The Two Trappers	December 31, 1922	
36	The Fable of a Stone Age Romeo	January 14, 1923	
37	The Fable of Cheating the Cheaters	January 21, 1923	
38	The Fable of a Fisherman's Jinx	January 28, 1923	
39	The Fable of a Raisin and a Cake of Yeast	February 4, 1923	Chemistry Lesson (Commonwealth TV)
40	The Fable of the Gliders	February 11, 1923	
41	The Fable of Troubles on the Ark	February 18, 1923	
42	The Fable of the Traveling Salesman	March 11, 1923	Smart Salesman (Commonwealth TV)
43	The Fable of the Alley Cat	March 25, 1923	
44	The Fable of Farmer Al Falfa's Bride	April 1, 1923	Wedding Bells (Commonwealth TV)
45	The Fable of Day by Day in Every Way	April 8, 1923	
46	The Fable of One Hard Pull	April 15, 1923	
47	The Fable of the Gamblers	April 22, 1923	
48	The Fable of Pharao's Tomb	May 6, 1923	
49	The Fable of the Mouse Catcher	May 13, 1923	
50	The Fable of a Fish Story	May 20, 1923	
51	Amateur Night on the Ark	May 27, 1923	
52	The Fable of Spooks	June 3, 1923	
53	Springtime	June 17, 1923	
54	The Burglar Alarm	June 24, 1923	
55	The Beauty Parlor	July 1, 1923	
56	The Covered Push-Cart	July 8, 1923	
57	Mysteries of the Sea	July 22, 1923	Wonders of the Deep (Commonwealth TV)
58	The Thoroughbred	July 29, 1923	Feathered Friend (Commonwealth TV)
59	The Marathon Dancers	August 5, 1923	
60	The Bad Bandit	August 19, 1923	
61	The Walrus Hunters	September 9, 1923	
62	The Cat's Revenge	September 16, 1923	
63	Farmer Al Falfa's Pet Cat	November 18, 1923	
64	Five Orphans of the Storm	December 23, 1923	Christmas Cartoon (Castle Films)
65	The Black Sheep	January 20, 1924	
66	Herman, the Great Mouse	March 2, 1924	
67	Why Mice Leave Home	March 16, 1924	
68	Running Wild	April 6, 1924	
69	If Noah Lived Today	April 13, 1924	Flying Ark (Commonwealth TV)
70	An Ideal Farm	April 27, 1924	
71	The Jealous Fisherman	May 18, 1924	
72	The Flying Carpet	June 8, 1924	
73	Flying Fever	August 3, 1924	
74	House Cleaning	August 17, 1924	
75	A Message From the Sea	August 31, 1924	Magic Boots/Black Magic (Commonwealth TV)
76	Barnyard Olympics	September 7, 1924	
77	In the Good Old Summer Time	September 14, 1924	
78	Noah's Outing	October 5, 1924	
79	Black Magic	October 19, 1924	
80	The Cat and the Magnet	November 2, 1924	
81	She Knew Her Man	November 16, 1924	
82	She's In Again	December 7, 1924	
83	Noah's Athletic Club	December 14, 1924	
84	On the Ice	January 4, 1925	Cracked Ice (Commonwealth TV)
85	African Huntsmen	January 18, 1925	
86	Hold That Thought	January 25, 1925	Concentrate (Commonwealth TV) (Fables Studios 1929 sound reissue)
87	A Transatlantic Flight	February 8, 1925	
88	Fisherman's Luck	February 22, 1925	
89	Clean Up Week	March 1, 1925	House Cleaning Time (Fables Studios 1929 sound reissue)
90	In Dutch	March 8, 1925	Wooden Shoes (Commonwealth TV)
91	Jungle Bike Riders	March 15, 1925	
92	The Pie Man	March 22, 1925	Custard Pies (Fables Studios 1929 sound reissue)
93	At the Zoo	March 29, 1925	
94	The Housing Shortage	April 5, 1925	
95	The Adventures of Adenoid	April 19, 1925	
96	Deep Stuff	April 26, 1925	
97	Permanent Waves	May 3, 1925	
98	Darkest Africa	May 10, 1925	
99	Echoes from the Alps	May 24, 1925	
100	Hot Times in Iceland	May 31, 1925	
101	The Runt	June 7, 1925	
102	The End of the World	June 14, 1925	The Big Scare (Fables Studios 1929 sound reissue)
103	The Runaway Balloon	June 21, 1925	
104	Office Help	June 28, 1925	
105	Wine, Women and Song	July 5, 1925	A Cat's Life/A Day's Outing (Commonwealth TV)
106	A Yarn About Yarn	August 2, 1925	
107	Bubbles	August 9, 1925	
108	Soap	August 16, 1925	
109	Over the Plate	August 23, 1925	
110	The Window Washers	August 30, 1925	
111	The Ugly Duckling	September 13, 1925	
112	Nuts and Squirrels	September 20, 1925	
113	Hungry Hounds	September 27, 1925	
114	Air-Cooled	October 18, 1925	
115	Closer Than a Brother	October 25, 1925	
116	More Mice Than Brains	November 15, 1925	
117	A Day's Outing	November 29, 1925	
118	The Bonehead Age	December 6, 1925	
119	The Haunted House	December 13, 1925	
120	The English Channel Swim	December 20, 1925	
121	Noah Had His Troubles	December 27, 1925	
122	The Gold Push	January 3, 1926	Gold Rush (Stuart Pictures/Guaranteed Pictures)
123	Three Blind Mice	January 10, 1926	
124	Lighter Than Air	January 17, 1926	
125	The Little Brown Jug	January 24, 1926	
126	A June Bride	January 31, 1926	
127	The Wind Jammers	February 7, 1926	
128	Hunting in 1950	February 14, 1926	
129	Spanish Love	March 7, 1926	
130	The Fire Fighter	March 14, 1926	
131	Up in the Air	March 21, 1926	
132	The Merry Blacksmith	April 4, 1926	
133	Hearts and Showers	April 18, 1926	
134	Farm Hands	May 2, 1926	
135	Liquid Dynamite	May 23, 1926	
136	The Bumper Crop	May 30, 1926	
137	The Land Boom	June 20, 1926	
138	A Plumber's Life	June 27, 1926	
139	Jungle Sports	July 4, 1926	Monkey Shines (Commonwealth TV)
140	Her Ben	July 25, 1926	Dog Catcher (Commonwealth TV)
141	The Dough Boys	August 8, 1926	
142	The Last Ha Ha	August 15, 1926	
143	Scrambled Eggs	August 22, 1926	Closer Than a Brother (Commonwealth TV)
144	A Knight Out	August 29, 1926	
145	Pests	September 5, 1926	
146	Watered Stock	September 26, 1926	
147	Why Argue?	October 3, 1926	Don't Get Excited (Commonwealth TV)
148	The Road House	October 10, 1926	
149	Gun Shy	October 24, 1926	
150	Home, Sweet Home	October 31, 1926	
151	Through Thick and Thin	November 7, 1926	Playmates (Commonwealth TV)
152	Buck Fever	November 28, 1926	
153	School Days	December 19, 1926	
154	Where Friendship Ceases	December 26, 1926	
155	The Musical Parrot	January 2, 1927	
156	Chasing Rainbows	January 16, 1927	
157	In the Rough	February 6, 1927	
158	Cracked Ice	February 27, 1927	Skating Hounds (Fables Studios 1929 sound reissue)
159	Taking the Air	March 6, 1927	
160	Keep of the Grass	March 27, 1927	A Day at the Park (Commonwealth TV)
161	The Medicine Man	April 3, 1927	
162	Anti-Fat	April 17, 1927	
163	The Pied-Eyed Piper	April 24, 1927	
164	A Fair Exchange	May 1, 1927	
165	When the Snow Flies	May 15, 1927	
166	Digging for Gold	May 29, 1927	
167	A Dog's Day	June 5, 1927	The Faithful Pup (Fables Studios 1929 sound reissue)
168	Hard Cider	June 12, 1927	
169	The One-Man Dog	June 26, 1927	
170	The Big Reward	July 3, 1927	
171	Riding High	July 10, 1927	
172	Red Hot Sands	August 14, 1927	
173	A Hole In One	August 21, 1927	
174	Hook, Line and Sinker	August 28, 1927	
175	Small Town Sheriff	September 4, 1927	Space Trip (Commonwealth TV)
176	Cutting a Melon	September 11, 1927	
177	The Human Fly	September 25, 1927	
178	The River of Doubt	October 2, 1927	
179	All Bull and a Yard Wide	October 9, 1927	On the Air (Commonwealth TV)
180	Lindy's Cat	October 16, 1927	
181	Signs of Spring	November 6, 1927	
182	The Fox Hunt	November 20, 1927	
183	Flying Fishers	November 27, 1927	
184	Carnival Week	December 4, 1927	
185	Rats in His Garret	December 11, 1927	
186	Christmas Cheer	December 18, 1927	
187	The Junk Man	December 25, 1927	Magnetized (Commonwealth TV)
188	The Broncho Buster	January 1, 1928	
189	A Short Circuit	January 8, 1928	
190	High Stakes	January 15, 1928	
191	Everybody's Flying	February 8, 1928	The Animal Aviators (Motion Picture Bureau)
192	On the Ice	March 11, 1928	
193	Scalling the Alps	April 1, 1928	
194	Barnyard Artists	April 29, 1928	
195	Coast to Coast	May 13, 1928	
196	The Mouse's Bride	June 24, 1928	
197	City Slickers	July 1, 1928	
198	The Huntsman	July 8, 1928	
199	The Baby Show	July 15, 1928	
200	In the Bag	August 26, 1928	The Picnic (Commonwealth TV)
201	Static	September 2, 1928	
202	Sunday on the Farm	September 16, 1928	
203	Cure or Kill	October 7, 1928	The Medicine Man (Commonwealth TV)
204	Dinner Time	October 14, 1928	
205	The Big Game	October 21, 1928	Grampus and Scrappy (Radio & Television Packagers)
206	Gridiron Demons	October 28, 1928	
207	On the Links	November 25, 1928	

== Van Beuren Corporation ==
#	Title	Release date	Reissue title
208	The Fishing Fool	December 2, 1928	
209	Barnyard Politics	December 16, 1928	
210	Stage Struck	December 23, 1928	
211	Flying Hoofs	December 23, 1928	
212	The Mail Man	December 30, 1928	
213	A White Elephant	January 13, 1929	
214	Snapping the Whip	January 20, 1929	Roller Skates (Commonwealth TV)
215	The Break of the Day	January 27, 1929	
216	Sweet Adeline	February 3, 1929	
217	Wooden Money	February 10, 1929	
218	The Under Dog	March 31, 1929	
219	The Water Cure	April 14, 1929	
220	The Little Game Hunter	May 5, 1929	
221	The Ball Park	May 19, 1929	In Baseballstadion (Commonwealth TV)
222	Snow Birds	June 9, 1929	
223	Kidnapped	June 23, 1929	
224	The Farmer's Goat	July 14, 1929	
225	A Midsummer's Day Dream	July 28, 1929	
226	Three Game Guys	August 4, 1929	
227	The Jungle Fool	September 15, 1929	
228	Summertime	October 11, 1929	
229	The Mill Pond	October 18, 1929	
230	The Barnyard Melody	November 1, 1929	
231	Tuning In	November 10, 1929	
232	Ship Ahoy	January 5, 1930	
233	The Iron Man	January 19, 1930	
234	Sky Skippers	February 16, 1930	
235	Midnight	October 12, 1930	

== Terrytoons ==
#	Title	Release date
236	French Fried	September 7, 1930
237	Club Sandwich	January 25, 1931
238	Razzberries	February 8, 1931
239	The Explorer	March 22, 1931
240	The Sultan's Cat	May 17, 1931
241	Jazz Mad	August 9, 1931
242	Canadian Capers	August 23, 1931
243	The Champ	September 20, 1931
244	Noah's Outing	January 24, 1932
245	Ye Olde Songs	March 20, 1932
246	Woodland	May 1, 1932
247	Farmer Al Falfa's Bedtime Story	June 12, 1932
248	Spring Is Here	July 24, 1932
249	Farmer Al Falfa's Ape Girl	August 7, 1932
250	Farmer Al Falfa's Birthday Party	October 2, 1932
251	Tropical Fish	May 14, 1933
252	Pick-Necking	September 8, 1933
253	The Village Blacksmith	November 3, 1933
254	Streamlined Robinson Crusoe	November 17, 1933
255	Holland Days	January 12, 1934
256	Rip Van Winkle	February 9, 1934
257	The Owl and the Pussycat	March 9, 1934
258	Why Mules Leave Home (aka Farmyard Whoopee)	September 7, 1934
259	Jack's Shack	November 30, 1934
260	What a Night	January 25, 1935
261	Old Dog Tray	March 21, 1935
262	Flying Oil	April 5, 1935
263	Moans and Groans	June 28, 1935
264	A June Bride	November 1, 1935
265	The 19th Hole Club	January 24, 1936
266	Home Town Olympics	February 7, 1936
267	The Alpine Yodeler	February 21, 1936
268	Barnyard Amateurs	March 6, 1936
269	The Western Trail	April 3, 1936
270	Rolling Stones	May 1, 1936
271	The Runt	May 15, 1936
272	The Hot Spell	July 10, 1936
273	Puddy the Pup and the Gypsies	July 24, 1936
274	Farmer Al Falfa's Prize Package	July 31, 1936
275	The Health Farm	September 4, 1936
276	A Battle Royal	October 30, 1936
277	Farmer Al Falfa's Twentieth Anniversary	November 27, 1936
278	Skunked Again	December 25, 1936
279	Tin Can Tourist	January 22, 1937
280	The Big Game Haunt (The Big Game Hunt)	February 19, 1937
281	Flying South	March 19, 1937
282	The Mechanical Cow	June 25, 1937
283	Pink Elephants	July 9, 1937
284	Trailer Life	August 20, 1937
285	A Close Shave	October 1, 1937
286	The Dancing Bear	October 15, 1937
287	The Billy Goat's Whiskers	December 10, 1937
288	Plane Goofy	November 29, 1940
289	Funny Bunny Business	February 6, 1942
290	The Cat Came Back	August 18, 1944
291	Swooning the Swooners	September 14, 1945
292	The Talking Magpies	January 4, 1946
293	The Uninvited Pests	November 29, 1946
294	Hounding the Hares	June 9, 1948
295	Uranium Blues	February 1, 1956
