= 1916 in animation =

Events in 1916 in animation.

== Events ==
- J.R. Bray's studio signs a contract with Paramount Studios.
- Raoul Barré and Charles Bowers establish the Barré-Bowers Studio.

== Films released ==
- Unknown date – Domestic Difficulties (United States)
- 6 January – Colonel Heeza Liar's Waterloo (United States)
- 27 January – Police Dog On the Wire (United States)
- 3 February – Farmer Al Falfa's Catastrophe (United States)
- 6 February - Mr. Addiquete and the Human Butcher (United States)
- 18 February – Introducing Krazy Kat and Ignatz Mouse (United States)
- 21 February – Krazy Kat and Ignatz Mouse Believe in Signs (United States)
- 25 February – Krazy Kat & Ignatz Mouse Discuss the Letter 'G' (United States)
- 29 February – Krazy Kat Goes A-Wooing (United States)
- 3 March – Krazy Kat and Ignatz Mouse: A Duet, He Made Me Love Him (United States)
- 5 March – Colonel Heeza Liar And The Pirates (United States)
- 6 March – Krazy Kat and Ignatz Mouse in Their One-Act Tragedy: "The Tail of the Nude Tail" (United States)
- 12 March – Farmer Al Falfa Invents a New Kite (United States)
- 14 March – Krazy Kat, Bugologist (United States)
- 17 March – Krazy Kat and Ignatz Mouse at the Circus (United States)
- 19 March - Chrissy Carson Drives Away (United States)
- 21 March – Krazy Kat Demi-Tasse (United States)
- 27 March – Krazy Kat Invalid (United States)
- 2 April – Police Dog Turns Nurse (United States)
- 3 April – Krazy Kat at the Switchboard (United States)
- 14 April:
  - A Tale That is Knot (United States)
  - Farmer Al Falfa's Scientific Diary (United States)
  - Krazy Kat the Hero (United States)
  - Krazy Kat to the Rescue (United States)
- 27 April – Colonel Heeza Liar Wins The Pennant (United States)
- 7 May – Police Dog in the Park (United States)
- 25 May – Colonel Heeza Liar Captures Villa (United States)
- 3 June – Farmer Al Falfa and his Tentless Circus (United States)
- 6 June – Working Out with the Police Dog (United States)
- 17 June – Krazy Kat at Looney Park (United States)
- 22 June – Colonel Heeza Liar And The Bandits (United States)
- 29 June – Farmer Al Falfa's Watermelon Patch (United States)
- 3 July – A Tempest in a Paint Pot (United States)
- 20 July – Colonel Heeza Liar's Courtship (United States)
- 4 August – Farmer Al Falfa's Egg-Citement (United States)
- 17 August – Colonel Heeza Liar On Strike (United States)
- 20 August - The Adventures of Izzy - The Great Sundae Challenge (United States)
- 24 August – Colonel Heeza Liar Plays Hamlet (United States)
- 14 September – Colonel Heeza Liar Bachelor Quarters (United States)
- 16 September – Farmer Al Falfa's Wolfhound (United States)
- 28 September - The Adventures of Izzy - The Haunting of the Ghost Peppers (United States)
- 9 October – Farmer Al Falfa Sees New York (United States)
- 11 October – Colonel Heeza Liar Gets Married (United States)
- 3 November – Farmer Al Falfa's Prune Plantation (United States)
- 15 November – Colonel Heeza Liar, Hobo (United States)
- 27 November – The Missing One (United States)
- 1 December – Farmer Al Falfa's Blind Pig (United States)
- 2 December - The Adventures of Izzy - Duncan Wise (United States)
- 21 December – Colonel Heeza Liar at The Vaudeville Show (United States)
- 23 December:
  - Krazy Kat Takes Little Katrina For an Airing (United States)
  - Zepped (United States)

== Births ==
=== January ===
- January 3: Maxene Andrews, American singer (co-sang the "Johnny Fedora and Alice Blue Bonnet" segment in Make Mine Music, and "Little Toot" in Melody Time), (d. 1995).
- January 18: Vladimir Degtyaryov, Russian film director and animator (Beloved Beauty), (d. 1974).

=== February ===
- February 8: Larz Bourne, American animation writer (Famous Studios, Gene Deitch, Hanna-Barbera, DePatie-Freleng Enterprises, Terrytoons), (d. 1993).
- February 12: Rudy Larriva, American animator and director (Warner Bros. Cartoons, UPA, the opening credits of The Twilight Zone), (d. 2010).
- February 23: Retta Scott, American artist (Walt Disney Animation Studios), (d. 1990).
- February 29: Dinah Shore, American singer and actress (sang the "Two Silhouettes" segment in Make Mine Music, and narrated and sang the "Bongo the Bear" segment in Fun and Fancy Free), (d. 1994).

=== March ===
- March 6:
  - Virginia Gregg, American actress (voice of Tara in The Herculoids), (d. 1986).
  - Rochelle Hudson, American actress (voice of Honey in the Bosko cartons), (d. 1972).
- March 15: Tom Okamoto, Japanese-American animator and comics artist (Walt Disney Animation Studios), (d. 1978).
- March 31: Lucille Bliss, American actress (voice of the title character in Crusader Rabbit, Anastasia Tremaine in Cinderella, Nibbles in Tom and Jerry, a sunflower and tulip in Alice in Wonderland, Smurfette in The Smurfs, Mrs. Beth Fitzgibbons in The Secret of NIMH, Ms. Bitters in Invader Zim), (d. 2012).

=== April ===
- April 26:
  - Eyvind Earle, American artist, author and illustrator (Walt Disney Animation Studios), (d. 2000).
  - Vic Perrin, American actor (voice of Dr. Zin in Jonny Quest), (d. 1989).

=== May ===
- May 6: Adriana Caselotti, American actress and singer (voice of the title character in Snow White and the Seven Dwarfs), (d. 1997).
- May 10: John McLeish, Canadian actor (narrator in Dumbo, The Ducktators, The Dover Boys, and many Goofy cartoons, voice of the Carnival Barker in Pinocchio and John Ployardt in The Wind in the Willows segment of The Adventures of Ichabod and Mr. Toad) and animation writer (The Rite of Spring segment in Fantasia), (d. 1969).
- May 21: Dennis Day, American actor, comedian and singer (narrator of the Johnny Appleseed segment in Melody Time), (d. 1988).

=== June ===
- June 17: Terry Gilkyson, American lyricist (wrote "The Bare Necessities" from The Jungle Book), (d. 1999).

=== July ===
- July 2: Ken Curtis, American singer and actor (voice of Nutsy in Robin Hood), (d. 1991).
- July 3: Al Stahl, American animator and comics artist (Terrytoons, Fleischer Brothers, Stahl's Animated Productions), (d. 1999).
- July 6: Don R. Christensen, American animator, comics artist and writer, scriptwriter (Walt Disney Company, Warner Bros. Cartoons, DePatie-Freleng, Hanna-Barbera), (d. 2006).
- July 27: Keenan Wynn, American actor (voice of the Winter Warlock in Santa Claus Is Comin' to Town, Captain Cully and the Harpy in The Last Unicorn), (d. 1986).

=== August ===
- August 4: Carlos Ramírez, Colombian singer (opera voice in Tex Avery's Magical Maestro), (d. 1986).
- August 21: Bill Lee, American playback singer (Walt Disney Animation Studios), (d. 1980).
- August 24: Hal Smith, American actor (voice of Owl in Winnie the Pooh, Goliath in Davey and Goliath, Flintheart Glomgold and Gyro Gearloose in DuckTales, continued voice of Goofy, Elmer Fudd, and Winnie the Pooh), (d. 1994).
- August 27: Larry Thor, Canadian newscaster, announcer, and actor (voice of Tock the Watchdog in The Phantom Tollbooth), (d. 1976).

=== September ===
- September 13: Hal Geer, American producer, film editor and animator (Looney Tunes), (d. 2017).
- September 25: Jack Boyd, American animator and special effects creator (Walt Disney Company), (d. 1998).

=== October ===
- October 4: George Sidney, American film director and producer (Anchors Aweigh, co-founder of Hanna-Barbera), (d. 2002).
- October 22: Sidney Miller, American actor (voice of the Dungeon Master in Dungeons & Dragons, Hornswoggle in The Gary Coleman Show, Horrg in Monchhichis, Oompe in Little Nemo: Adventures in Slumberland), (d. 2004).
- October 31: Phil Monroe, American animator and film director (Warner Bros. Cartoons, Walt Disney Company, UPA, Terrytoons), (d. 1988).

=== November ===
- November 4: Walter Cronkite, American broadcast journalist (voice of Captain Neweyes in We're Back! A Dinosaur's Story, Benjamin Franklin in Liberty's Kids), (d. 2009).
- November 14: Sherwood Schwartz, American television writer and producer (creator of The Brady Kids, The New Adventures of Gilligan and Gilligan's Planet, co-wrote the song "The Ballad of Gilligan's Isle" which was used on Rugrats Go Wild and the Robot Chicken episode "Suck It", and "The Brady Bunch Theme" which was parodied as the "T.U.F.F. and D.O.O.M. Theme" in the T.U.F.F. Puppy episode "Share-A-Lair"), (d. 2011).
- November 15: Bill Melendez, American animator (Walt Disney Animation Studios, Warner Bros. Cartoons, UPA), film director (Peanuts specials) and actor (voice of Snoopy and Woodstock), (d. 2008).
- November 16: Daws Butler, American actor (voice of the City Wolf in Tex Avery's Little Rural Riding Hood, Mysto the Magician in Avery's Magical Maestro, Spike the Bulldog in Tom & Jerry, Chilly Willy in Walter Lantz's cartoons, Nasty Canasta in Barbary Coast Bunny, Huckleberry Hound, Yogi Bear, Snagglepuss, Hokey Wolf, Elroy Jetson in The Jetsons, Wally Gator, Quick Draw McGraw, Loopy De Loop), (d. 1988).
- November 17: Diana Chesney, British-American actress (voice of Mrs. Judson in The Great Mouse Detective), (d. 2004).
- November 19: George Hall, Canadian actor (additional voices in Courage the Cowardly Dog), (d. 2002).
- November 27: Chick Hearn, American sportscaster (voice of The Announcer in Sport Goofy in Soccermania, Chick Mouse in the Garfield and Friends episode "Basket Brawl", Announcer in the Life with Louie episode "The Masked Chess Boy", himself in The Simpsons episode "Homer Defined", and the Duckman episode "Vuuck, as in Duck"), (d. 2002).
- November 30: Owen Fitzgerald, American animator and comics artist (Walt Disney Company, Fleischer Studios, Warner Bros. Cartoons, DePatie-Freleng, Hanna-Barbera), (d. 1994).

=== December ===
- December 9: Kirk Douglas, American actor (voice of Chester J. Lampwick in The Simpsons episode "The Day the Violence Died"), (d. 2020).
- December 14: John Freeman, American animator (Walt Disney Company, Peanuts specials, Hanna-Barbera, Ruby-Spears, DePatie-Freleng), (d. 2010).
- December 15: Dick Kinney, American animator, screenwriter (Walter Lantz, Walt Disney Company, Terrytoons, Hanna-Barbera) and comics writer, (d. 1985).
