= List of Our Cartoon President episodes =

The following is a list of episodes from the American animated satirical television series Our Cartoon President.

== Series overview ==
Season	Episodes	Originally released	
Season	Episodes	First released	Last released
1	17	February 11, 2018	August 26, 2018
Special		November 4, 2018	
2	10	May 12, 2019	July 14, 2019
3	18	January 26, 2020	November 8, 2020

== Episodes ==
=== Season 1 (2018) ===
No. overall	No. in season	Title	Written by	Original release date	U.S. viewers (millions)
1	1	"State of the Union"	Story by : Stephen Colbert, Chris Licht, Matt Lappin, Tim Luecke & R. J. Fried; Teleplay by : R. J. Fried	February 11, 2018 (Note: Premiered early online through the ShowtimeAnytime app on January 28, 2018.)	0.439
Trump tries to revive his low approval ratings by delivering the greatest State of the Union speech in history and to strengthen his relationship with First Lady Melania by naming her the national bird.
2	2	"Disaster Response"	Zach Smilovitz	February 11, 2018	0.417
Trump avoids comforting disaster victims by recruiting a team of impersonators to do the job while his son Eric sets out to prove he's truly a part of the Trump family.
3	3	"Rolling Back Obama"	Mike Leech	February 18, 2018	0.298
Trump power-saws through the Resolute desk. Cartoon Trump sets out to reverse every last one of President Obama's accomplishments while a timid Jared Kushner and intense Stephen Miller spark an unlikely friendship.
4	4	"Family Leave"	Bob Powers	February 25, 2018	0.260
Trump tries to win back Ivanka Trump by supporting her progressive Paid Family Leave initiative, a move that sends Fox & Friends' Brian Kilmeade into an existential crisis.
5	5	"State Dinner"	Cathy Lew	March 4, 2018	0.124
Trump tries to outdo handsome Canadian Prime Minister Justin Trudeau at the White House's first State Dinner while Don Jr. sees an opportunity to make a new best friend.
6	6	"Media Strategy"	Sam West	March 11, 2018	0.164
Trump battles with the news media after an embarrassing video surfaces of First Lady Melania rolling her eyes, leading her to seek face coaching from dead-eyed Press Secretary Sarah Huckabee Sanders.
7	7	"Wealth Gap"	Jennifer F. Jackson	March 18, 2018	0.199
Trump tries to boost public perception of his questionable net worth, while Vice President Mike Pence grapples with Second Lady Karen Pence's newfound obsession with the finer things.
8	8	"Government Shutdown"	Gabe Gundacker	March 25, 2018	0.195
Trump lets loose while General Kelly is out of town, throwing a party in the wake of a government shutdown and inspiring congressional leaders to have wild night in a hot tub.
9	9	"Church and State"	Eliana Kwartler	April 1, 2018	0.180
Trump tries to shore up his Evangelical base by embracing Christianity, while his son-in-law Jared Kushner embraces the Don Jr. and Eric religion of Trumpianity.
10	10	"First Pitch"	R. J. Fried	April 8, 2018	0.171
Trump tries to prove he's a man's man by throwing out the first pitch at a Washington Nationals game, while Ivanka attempts to become a feminist icon by opening a school for girls.
11	11	"Russia Investigation"	Zach Smilovitz	July 15, 2018	0.186
Trump tries to survive the Russia investigation with Steve Mnuchin's help while Nancy Pelosi and Chuck Schumer fire up Democrats with a new message.
12	12	"First Family"	Jocelyn Richard	July 22, 2018	0.126
Trump patches up his marriage to Melania while Don Jr. and Eric stay on their best behavior ahead of the 2018 midterm elections.
13	13	"Mueller Probe"	Mike Leech	July 29, 2018	0.137
Trump struggles to keep his disloyal staff from cooperating with Robert Mueller while Karen Pence worries that her husband's Mar-a-Lago trip changed him forever.
14	14	"The Senior Vote"	Bob Powers	August 5, 2018	0.101
Trump energizes elderly voters ahead of the midterm elections while Don Jr. leaves behind his hard partying ways and acts his age with the help of Paul Ryan and Mike Pence.
15	15	"The Wall"	Jennifer F. Jackson	August 12, 2018	0.161
Trump nefariously drums up funding for The Wall while Sarah Huckabee Sanders and Stephen Miller go to the southern border to pull off the most "Trumpian" groundbreaking in history.
16	16	"Civil War"	R. J. Fried	August 19, 2018	0.122
Trump learns to campaign like a traditional non-racist president with help from Mike Pence while Karen Pence plots her husband's ascent to the presidency.
17	17	"Militarization"	Gabe Gundacker	August 26, 2018	0.167
Trump militarizes the government and launches a military parade with National Security Advisor John Bolton's help while Sean Hannity reshapes his cable news network in his aggressive image (the planned 2018 Washington Veterans Day Parade was canceled).

=== Special (2018) ===
Title	Written by	Original release date	U.S. viewers (millions)
"Our Cartoon President: Election Special 2018"	Story by : R. J. Fried; Teleplay by : R. J. Fried, Mike Leech, & Zach Smilovitz	November 4, 2018	0.108
Fearing a Democratic blue wave and the threat of impeachment, Trump teams up with his son Don Jr. to help Republicans win the midterm elections and save America from the grips of democracy.

=== Season 2 (2019) ===
No. overall	No. in season	Title	Written by	Original release date	U.S. viewers (millions)
18	1	"Trump Tower-Moscow"	R. J. Fried	May 12, 2019	0.158
Trump declares a national emergency to build Trump Tower Moscow while Democratic leaders Nancy Pelosi and Chuck Schumer attempt to win back their base from newcomer Alexandria Ocasio-Cortez. Jeff Bezos breaks ground of a fictitious Amazon warehouse with Vladimir Putin in Russia.
19	2	"The Party of Trump"	Zach Smilovitz	May 19, 2019	0.184
Pete Buttigieg, Elizabeth Warren, Beto O'Rourke, Bernie Sanders, Cory Booker, Amy Klobuchar, and Kamala Harris strategize against Joe Biden. Trump fights a right-wing revolt led by Ann Coulter by becoming the most deplorable president in history while Mitt Romney rallies Senator Susan Collins to take back the party for "decent" Republicans.
20	3	"Culture War"	Mike Leech	May 26, 2019	0.179
Trump declares war on corporate America with the aid of My Pillow CEO Mike Lindell while an out-of-step Joe Biden seeks Barack Obama's help to defeat his Democratic opponents in 2020.
21	4	"The Best People"	Bob Powers	June 2, 2019	0.126
Trump makes his cabinet more competent to prove he only hires "the best people," while a freshly bearded Ted Cruz sets out to makeover Stephen Miller in his slightly less repulsive image.
22	5	"Mental Fitness"	Jennifer F. Jackson	June 9, 2019	0.109
Trump must prove his mental fitness after declaring nuclear war with Portugal while the cast of Fox & Friends transforms their show into more cerebral content that doesn't flame the president's insanity.
23	6	"Visiting the Troops"	Gabriel Gundacker	June 16, 2019	0.177
Trump uses Hollywood magic to fake a handshake with the troops while a lonely Don Jr. forms a fast friendship with tech mogul Elon Musk.
24	7	"Supreme Court"	Gabriel Gundacker, Jennifer F. Jackson, & Bob Powers	June 23, 2019	0.166
Trump schmoozes the Supreme Court at Mar-A-Lago to ensure the court upholds his right to commit crimes while Eric attempts to babysit an intoxicated Brett Kavanaugh.
25	8	"Climate Change"	Mike Leech	June 30, 2019	0.144
Trump decides to buck his party and reverse climate change to solve his sweating problem while a disheveled Bernie Sanders asks Mitt Romney to transform him into a polished candidate.
26	9	"Save the Right"	Zach Smilovitz	July 7, 2019	0.091
Trump teams up with Ben Shapiro to fight for the civil rights of right-wing personalities.
27	10	"Space Force"	R. J. Fried	July 14, 2019	0.105
Trump pushes for the launch of his Space Force without thinking about the details. Meanwhile, the Democratic candidates try to tank their campaigns only to be threatened by Howard Schultz.

=== Season 3 (2020) ===
Note: Due to the COVID-19 pandemic effect, the second half of Season 3's episodes were animated remotely.

No. overall	No. in season	Title	Written by	Original release date	U.S. viewers (millions)
28	1	"Impeachment"	Zach Smilovitz	January 26, 2020	N/A
After the House of Representatives impeaches Trump, he teams up with Sean Hannity to convince the nation he's been wrongly accused. Meanwhile, Elizabeth Warren worries her wonky approach won't connect with Iowa voters and severely dumbs down her campaign with the help of Brian Kilmeade, Chris Cuomo, and Joe Kennedy III.
29	2	"The Economy"	R. J. Fried	February 2, 2020	N/A
After Trump discovers that an impending economic downturn threatens his re-election chances, he and his sons Don Jr. and Eric must con the country into believing the economy has never been stronger. Meanwhile, a gaffe-prone Joe Biden solicits help from Alexandria Ocasio-Cortez to help him appear “with it.”
30	3	"Election Security"	Bob Powers	February 9, 2020	N/A
Fearing massive Democratic voter turnout, Trump, with the help of Cartoon “Moscow” Mitch McConnell, guts election security measures, leaving the door wide open for Russian interference. Meanwhile, Pete Buttigieg struggles to keep his campaign viable after the scandalous revelation that he's only the mayor of South Bend, Indiana.
31	4	"Fox News"	Mike Leech	February 16, 2020	N/A
After Trump sees Fox News giving airtime to Democrats, he ends their relationship and sets out to find a new media arm to spread his message. Meanwhile, Bernie Sanders witnesses his rival candidates co-opting his message and sets out to hold them to their left wing promises.
32	5	"Hillary 2020"	Gabriel Gundacker	February 23, 2020	N/A
After Michael Bloomberg's campaign stumbles, he enlists Hillary Clinton to take up the billionaire cause and launch a run for president. Meanwhile, Kellyanne Conway and Larry Kudlow grow tired of defending the president and enlist Elon Musk to create an Oval Office simulator to distract Trump.
33	6	"The Endorsement"	Jennifer F. Jackson	March 1, 2020	N/A
At the urging of Speaker Pelosi and Leader Schumer, Joe Biden pursues Barack Obama's prized endorsement in hopes of clinching the nomination. Meanwhile, Kellyanne Conway must convince Trump that his fabled and impossibly positive "internal polls" actually do exist.
34	7	"Warren Vs. Facebook"	Mark Thompson	March 8, 2020	N/A
After a fake news story spreads on Facebook that threatens Elizabeth Warren's campaign, she vows to hold cartoon tech giant Mark Zuckerberg accountable. Meanwhile, Eric grows insecure about his position in the Trump family hierarchy and, with the help of his wife Lara, he sets out to become the Trump campaign's media darling.
35	8	"G-7"	Maureen Monahan	March 15, 2020	N/A
Russia has been voted out of the G-7 back in 2014. After the G-7 nations make Trump feel like a loser at the planned G-7 summit at Camp David, he decides to start his own international alliance for cool dictators including Putin, Turkey's Erdogan, and Saudi Arabia's Mohammad bin Salman. Meanwhile, Ivanka and Don Jr. fight to see who will inherit the Trump dynasty.
36	9	"Secret Money"	Allie Levitan	March 22, 2020	N/A
After Trump learns he doesn't have enough money to pay his lawyers, he realizes he must fundraise from dreaded Silicon Valley tech moguls Zuckerberg, Musk and Bezos. Meanwhile, Elizabeth Warren, also strapped for cash, swallows her pride and seeks help from Wall Street and Michael Bloomberg.
37	10	"Coronavirus"	Mike Leech	September 13, 2020	N/A
In the mid-season premiere, with the pandemic ravaging the country and his reelection in jeopardy, Trump launches a propaganda campaign to convince America he's got the crisis under control. Meanwhile, after social distancing guidelines force Joe Biden out of the spotlight and into his basement, he enlists Barack Obama to help him recapture his former glory.
38	11	"Party Unity"	Jennifer F. Jackson	September 20, 2020	N/A
Feeling overshadowed by the idolized Bernie Sanders and Barack Obama, Joe Biden sets out to earn his place as the face of the Democratic Party. Meanwhile, Don Jr. and Eric Trump try to develop a miracle cure for coronavirus with the help of MyPillow CEO Mike Lindell.
39	12	"Debate Prep"	R. J. Fried, Mike Leech & Zach Smilovitz	September 27, 2020	N/A
With the first presidential debate looming, Trump must learn to behave like a civilized human being with the help of Kellyanne Conway and Mitch McConnell. Meanwhile, Jill Biden teaches the gaffe-prone Joe Biden how to think before he speaks.
40	13	"Madam Vice President"	Bob Powers	October 4, 2020	N/A
After Joe Biden's record comes under scrutiny, Kamala Harris must publicly forgive him for his problematic past, even if it tarnishes her own record in the process. Meanwhile, as Mike Pence prepares for the imminent vice presidential debate, he struggles with the moral dilemma of studying intimate details of a woman who is not his wife.
41	14	"Hiding Joe Biden"	Gabriel Gundacker	October 11, 2020	N/A
Chuck Schumer and Nancy Pelosi trap Joe Biden on an Amtrak train to nowhere. Meanwhile, Donald Trump Jr. tries to impress his father by digging up dirt on Hunter Biden.
42	15	"Wartime President"	Maureen Monahan	October 18, 2020	N/A
With a restless nation turning against him, Trump declares war on the invisible enemy COVID-19 and exploits the benefits of a wartime Presidency.
43	16	"Senate Control"	Ziwe	October 25, 2020	N/A
Chuck Schumer and Nancy Pelosi try to avoid responsibility by sabotaging their own party's electoral chances. Meanwhile, Susan Collins flees to her home state of Maine to lead a life of zero accountability.
44	17	"Closing Arguments"	Naima Pearce	November 1, 2020	N/A
With his popularity dangerously low, Trump must do the unthinkable and campaign one-on-one with average Americans. Meanwhile, Joe Biden tries to energize his half-hearted supporters.
45	18	"Election Day"	Jen Jackson; Mike Leech	November 8, 2020	N/A
In the series finale, it's Election Day and everyone is gearing up to find out who will be the next Our Cartoon President. Will it be Donald Trump or Joe Biden? Either way, everything is about to change forever.
