= CBS Eye Animation Productions =

American animation studio

- Type: Division
- Industry: Television animation
- Predecessors: Group W Productions; Terrytoons; Viacom Productions
- Founded: October 2018; 8 years ago
- Headquarters: CBS Studio Center, Los Angeles, California, U.S. (2018–25); Television City, Los Angeles, California, U.S. (2025–present)
- Key people: Alec Botnick (head of animation, 2018–2023)
- Owner: Skydance
- Parent: CBS Studios (2018–2026); Skydance Television Animation (2026–present)
- Divisions: Late Night Cartoons, Inc.

CBS Eye Animation Productions is the television animation studio division of Skydance via CBS Studios, itself owned by Skydance Corporation. The studio is closely associated with the Star Trek franchise with its first projects, Star Trek: Lower Decks and Star Trek: Prodigy.

== Background ==
In the 1950s, CBS began to invest further into television programs, creating many live shows as I Love Lucy and Captain Kangaroo. However, by 1956, CBS' syndication division, CBS Films, purchased Terrytoons. Subsequently, CBS placed Terrytoons under the management of UPA's Gene Deitch (who had already secured a contract with CBS). Deitch would soon produce animated Tom Terrific shorts for Captain Kangaroo in 1957. Terrytoons would continue animation under CBS until its closure in 1972 after the corporate spin-off of CBS' syndication division which, at the time, became Viacom Enterprises, and CBS would begin to contract with other production companies to provide animated programming on Saturday mornings and primetime rather than producing it in-house.

== History ==
In late 2018, CBS Studios unveiled CBS Eye Animation Productions to produce animated content for CBS All Access (now Paramount+). Star Trek: Lower Decks would become the first animated television series, followed by Star Trek: Prodigy (a co-production with sister studio Nickelodeon Animation Studio). Initially, the studio would only create shows based on the Star Trek franchise but has invested in other shows such as The Harper House and Showtime's Our Cartoon President, as well as critically acclaimed live-action/animated news program, Tooning Out the News.

On September 29, 2022, the CBS Eye Animation Productions employees formed a union with Animation Guild IATSE Local 839 to publicly submit a letter for voluntary recognition.

=== Late Night Cartoons, Inc. ===
The Late Show host Stephen Colbert and his production company, Spartina Productions, founded Late Night Cartoons, Inc., an animation studio that has collaborated with developers of Adobe Character Animator to produce and provide real-time interactive animations for broadcast. Their topical productions range from a live interview with an animated cartoon version of Donald Trump and Hillary Clinton in 2016 to several animated series including; Showtime's Our Cartoon President, Paramount+/Comedy Central’s Tooning Out the News, and Comedy Central’s Fairview. Another series, Washingtonia, was announced with a trailer in October 2021, but has not aired anywhere since.

== Filmography ==
=== TV series ===
#	Title	Creator(s) / Developer(s)	Years	Co-production with	Network	Notes
2020s
1	Star Trek: Lower Decks	Mike McMahan	2020–2024	Secret Hideout; Important Science; Roddenberry Entertainment; Titmouse, Inc.	CBS All Access (2020); Paramount+ (2021–2024)	Based on the 1966 TV series and its spin-offs by Gene Roddenberry
2	The Harper House	Brad Neely	2021	Neely Comics; 219 Productions; Titmouse, Inc.	Paramount+	
3	Star Trek: Prodigy	Kevin and Dan Hageman	2021–2024	Nickelodeon Animation Studio; Secret Hideout; Roddenberry Entertainment; Brothers Hageman Productions	Paramount+ (2021–2022); Nickelodeon (2021–2022); Netflix (2024)	Based on the 1966 TV series and its spin-offs by Gene Roddenberry
4	Everybody Still Hates Chris	Sanjay Shah	2024–2025	Sanjay Shah Productions; CR Enterprises, Inc. 3 Arts Entertainment; Titmouse, Inc. MTV Entertainment Studios (2024)	Comedy Central	Revival and sequel to Everybody Hates Chris
5	Among Us	Owen Dennis	2026	Keybot; Innersloth; Titmouse, Inc.	Paramount+	Based on the video game by Innersloth
6	Golden Axe	Mike McMahan; Joe Chandler	2026	Chandyland; Important Science; Sony Pictures Television; Original Film; Sega Sammy Group; Titmouse, Inc.	Paramount+	Based on the video game series by Sega

=== TV specials ===
#	Title	Year	Co-production with	Network	Notes
1	Reindeer in Here	2022	The Tiny Toons Co. Jam Filled Entertainment	CBS	Based on the children's book by Adam Reed

=== Late Night Cartoons, Inc. ===
#	Title	Creator(s) / Developer(s)	Years	Co-production with	Network	Notes
2010s
1	Our Cartoon President	Stephen Colbert; Chris Licht; Tim Luecke; R. J. Fried; Matt Lappin	2018–2020	Spartina Productions; Licht Media Solutions; Showtime Networks	Showtime	
2020s
2	Tooning Out the News	Stephen Colbert; R. J. Fried; Chris Licht; Tim Luecke; Zach Smilovitz; Mike Leech	2020–2023	Spartina Productions; Licht Media Solutions; RJ Fried Worldwide	CBS All Access (2020); Paramount+ (2021); Comedy Central (2022–2023)	
3	Fairview	R. J. Fried; Stephen Colbert; Chris Licht; Tim Luecke; Kim Gamble; Grant Gish; Mike Leech; Zach Smilovitz	2022	Spartina Productions; Licht Media Solutions; RJ Fried Worldwide; MTV Entertainment Studios	Comedy Central	

== See also ==
- MTV Animation
- Nickelodeon Animation Studio
- Nickelodeon Movies
- Paramount Animation
- Terrytoons
- Warner Bros. Animation
- Warner Bros. Pictures Animation
- Hanna-Barbera Productions
- Cartoon Network Studios
- Hanna-Barbera Studios Europe
- Williams Street
- List of animation studios owned by Paramount Global
