= List of animation studios owned by Skydance =

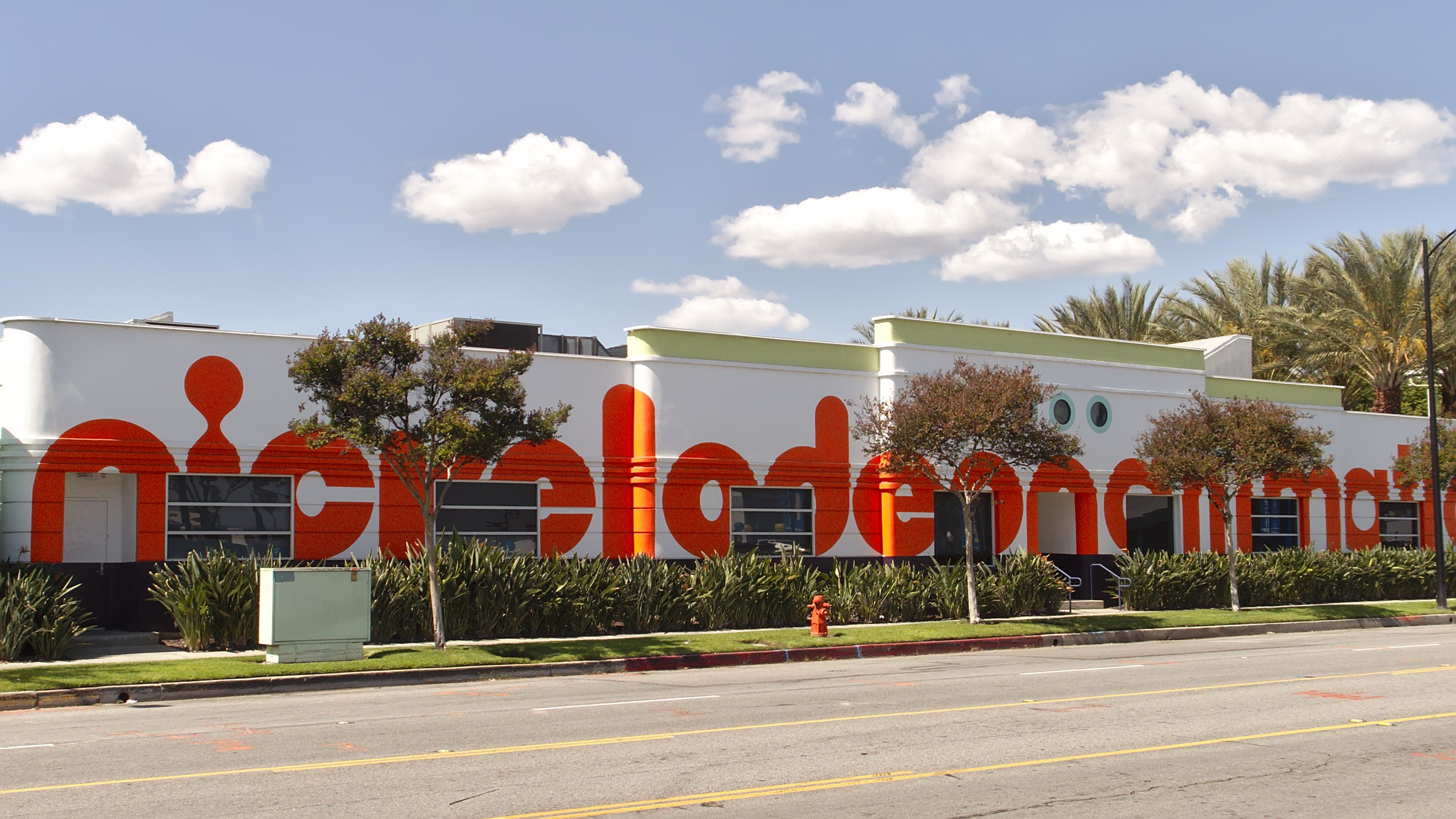
The Nickelodeon Animation Studio located in Burbank, California.

Skydance has owned and operated several animation studios since its founding on March 16, 1952 as the original Viacom, throughout the first and second incarnation and CBS Corporation (previously Westinghouse Electric Corporation). The two companies merged into one on December 4, 2019, before merging with Skydance Media in 2025 and Warner Bros. Discovery in 2026.

Currently, MTV Animation, Nickelodeon Animation Studio, Cartoon Network Studios, Paramount Animation (through Paramount Pictures), Skydance Animation, Warner Bros. Pictures Animation (through Warner Bros. Pictures), CBS Eye Animation Productions, Warner Bros. Animation operate their flagship brands.

== Full list ==
Current animation studios
Studio	Established	Parent unit
Warner Bros. Animation	1980	Skydance Television Animation
Animation: Television & DVD films, short films, specials and television series in hand-drawn, digital, and CGI. Current animation division of Warner Bros. and successor of Warner Bros. Cartoons. Units: Warner Bros. Television Animation (1981–2003), Warner Bros. Feature Animation (1994–2004), Warner Bros. Animation VFX (2004–2018)
Nickelodeon Animation Studios	1990	Skydance Television Animation
Animation: Television series, specials, and TV films Animation division producing original series and films for Nickelodeon brands such as Nickelodeon and Nick Jr. Former names: Games Productions Inc. (1990–1998) Units: Nickelodeon Digital Subunits: Paws, Inc., Avatar Studios
MTV Animation	1993	Paramount Television Studios (Skydance Television Studios Group)
Animation: Television series and feature films Animation division of MTV producing animated series and films for MTV brands.
Cartoon Network Studios	1994	Warner Bros. Animation (Skydance Television Animation)
Animation: Television series, specials and feature films Currently an animation division of Warner Bros (operated through Warner Bros. Discovery Networks, formerly Turner Broadcasting System) under The Cartoon Network, Inc. The studio produces original series and films for Cartoon Network. The studio also does some live-action programming for the channel. Satellite studios: CN LA Original Productions
Williams Street	1994	Skydance Television Animation
Animation: Television series, specials and feature films Currently an animation division of Warner Bros (operated through Warner Bros. Discovery Networks, formerly Turner Broadcasting System) under The Cartoon Network, Inc. The studio produces live-action and animated series and films for Cartoon Network's programming block Adult Swim. Former names: Ghost Planet Industries (1994–1999) (Note: Original name for Williams Street, taking its name from the fictional planet from Space Ghost.); Units: Big Pixel Studios, Williams Street Records
Hanna-Barbera Studios Europe	2007	Warner Bros. Animation (Skydance Television Animation)
Animation: Television series, specials, shorts and feature films Currently an animation division of Warner Bros (operated through Warner Bros. Discovery Networks, formerly Turner Broadcasting System) under The Cartoon Network, Inc. The studio produces series and shorts across Europe, such as The Amazing World of Gumball. Former names: Cartoon Network Development Studio Europe (2007–2019), Cartoon Network Studios Europe (2017–2021).
Paramount Animation	2011	Paramount Pictures
Animation: Theatrical feature films Animation division of Paramount.
Skydance Animation	2017	Paramount Pictures
Animation: Streaming feature films and TV series Animation division of Paramount. Units: Skydance Animation Madrid
CBS Eye Animation Productions	2018	Skydance Television Animation
Animation: Television series and TV films The animation production company of CBS Studios. Units: Late Night Cartoons, Inc.
Miramax Animation (49% stake)	2019	Miramax (Paramount Pictures)
Animation: Theatrical feature films and TV series Animation division of Miramax.

== Skydance Motion Picture Group ==
=== Paramount Animation ===
Founded in 2011, Paramount Animation is the animation division of Paramount Pictures that creates animated theatrical films. The company serves after a successor to Paramount Cartoon Studios (and the previous animation studios before it).

==== Projects ====
Release date	Title	Notes
February 6, 2015	The SpongeBob Movie: Sponge Out of Water (Note: Combines live-action with animation) (Note: Co-produced with Nickelodeon Movies)	
January 13, 2017	Monster Trucks	
March 23, 2018	Sherlock Gnomes	
March 15, 2019	Wonder Park	
August 14, 2020 (Note: Released theatrically only in Canada)	The SpongeBob Movie: Sponge on the Run	
December 15, 2021	Rumble	
October 27, 2023	Under the Boardwalk	
February 2, 2024	The Tiger's Apprentice	
September 20, 2024	Transformers One	
July 18, 2025	Smurfs	
December 19, 2025	The SpongeBob Movie: Search for SquarePants	
August 14, 2026	Paw Patrol: The Dino Movie	

=== Warner Bros. Pictures Animation ===
Warner Bros. Pictures Animation (formerly known as the Warner Animation Group) was created in 2013, by Jeff Robinov to create animated theatrical films for Warner Bros. Pictures, and to replace the shuttered Warner Bros. Feature Animation which closed in 2004.

==== Projects ====
Release date	Title	Notes
February 7, 2014	The Lego Movie	
June 17, 2014	Enter the Ninjago	Included with the home media release of The Lego Movie.
January 29, 2016	The Lego Movie: 4D – A New Adventure	An attraction at Legoland Florida
September 23, 2016	The Master	Short which premiered before the theatrical release of Storks
September 23, 2016	Storks	
February 10, 2017	The Lego Batman Movie	
September 22, 2017	The Lego Ninjago Movie	
September 28, 2018	Smallfoot	
February 8, 2019	The Lego Movie 2: The Second Part	
May 15, 2020	Scoob!	
February 26, 2021	Tom & Jerry	
July 16, 2021	Space Jam: A New Legacy	
July 29, 2022	DC League of Super-Pets	
August 28, 2026	Coyote vs. Acme	
November 6, 2026	Daffy Season	Short which premiered before the theatrical release of The Cat in the Hat
November 6, 2026	The Cat in the Hat	

=== Skydance Animation ===
Founded in 2017, Skydance Animation is the animation division of Paramount Pictures that creates animated theatrical films. The studio is based in Los Angeles, with offices in East Hartford, Connecticut, and Madrid, Spain; the Madrid branch was originally Ilion Animation Studios.

==== Projects ====
Release date	Title	Notes
August 5, 2022	Luck	
November 22, 2024	Spellbound	
May 1, 2026	Swapped	

=== Fleischer Studios ===
Fleischer Studios was founded in 1921 by Max Fleischer and his brother Dave Fleischer who originally ran the pioneering company. The studios are most well known for creating famous characters such as Koko the Clown, Betty Boop, Bimbo, and producing shorts for licensed characters such as Popeye the Sailor and Superman. In 1942, Fleischer Studios was renamed to Famous Studios (later Paramount Cartoon Studios) after Paramount Pictures acquired it. The studio has also released animated feature films under Paramount.

==== Projects ====
Release date	Title	Notes
December 22, 1939	Gulliver's Travels	
December 5, 1941	Mr. Bug Goes to Town	

=== Famous Studios/Paramount Cartoon Studios ===
Famous Studios (later renamed Paramount Cartoon Studios in 1956) was Paramount Pictures' first animation division. It was founded as a successor to Fleischer Studios after Paramount seized its founders, Max and Dave Fleischer's control in 1941. The studio's productions included three series started by the Fleischer Popeye the Sailor, Superman, and Screen Songs. It also featured Harvey Comic characters such as Little Audrey, Little Lulu, Casper the Friendly Ghost, Honey Halfwitch, Herman and Katnip, Baby Huey, and the anthology Noveltoons series. After the animation studio shut down in 1967, Paramount sold most of these original characters back to their original owners.

=== Terrytoons ===
Terrytoons was founded in 1929 by Paul Terry, Frank Moser, and Joseph Coffman. The studio has brought many cartoon characters such as Mighty Mouse, Heckle & Jeckle, Gandy Goose, Sourpuss, Dinky Duck, Luno, and Farmer Al Falfa (from Bray Productions, the studios' predecessor). 20th Century Fox (and its precursor Fox Films) originally released Terrytoons theatrical shorts. In 1955, CBS purchased the studio. The theatrical library was transferred under Paramount Pictures (via the ViacomCBS re-merger). Its television library still remains under CBS Entertainment Group.

== Skydance Television Studios Group ==
=== CBS Eye Animation Productions ===
Founded in 2018, CBS Eye Animation Productions is the animation production arm of CBS Studios. Its first projects announced were two Star Trek animated series, Star Trek: Lower Decks and Star Trek: Prodigy (for Nickelodeon & Paramount+).

=== Nickelodeon Animation Studio ===
Founded in 1990, Nickelodeon Animation Studio was originally named Games Animation (previously Games Productions Inc.); it oversaw the production of animated programs for Nickelodeon such as Doug, Rugrats, and The Ren & Stimpy Show with Rocko's Modern Life becoming Games Animation's first fully in-house series produced for the network. In 1998-99 the studio's name was changed to Nickelodeon Animation Studio following relocation from Studio City, California to Burbank with a second facility in New York City in 1999.

=== MTV Animation ===
Established in 1986, MTV Animation began by producing several animated shorts that aired as bumpers for its namesake network. While its department is often grouped with that of Nickelodeon's, the two entities are completely separate. MTV's cartoons typically have more dark humor, sexual jokes, graphic violence, and pop culture references than its sister studio. In the early 2000s, MTV Animation branched out to Web-based content. As of recently, the current state of the studio remains unknown.

=== Warner Bros. Cartoons ===
Established in 1933, after Harman and Ising who had been creating animated shorts for Warner Bros. since 1927, left for Metro-Goldwyn-Mayer. Warner Bros. Cartoons began creating animated shorts for the company, going on to launch the most famous characters in history, Bugs Bunny, Porky Pig and Daffy Duck for the Looney Tunes and Merrie Melodies series. The animation studio created dozens of award-winning shorts before shuttering in 1969.

=== Cartoon Network Studios ===
Founded in 1994, Cartoon Network Studios originated as a division of Hanna-Barbera, that focused on producing original programing for Cartoon Network including Dexter's Laboratory, Johnny Bravo, and The Powerpuff Girls. Following the merger of Hanna-Barbera's parent, Turner Broadcasting System with Time Warner, the Hanna-Barbera studio was folded into Warner Bros. Animation by its chief executive, Jean MacCurdy. After Hanna-Barbera merged into Warner Bros. Animation, Cartoon Network Studios was resurrected as a separate entity.

=== Williams Street ===
Created in 1994, Williams Street Productions was started by Cartoon Network to produce more adult-targeted serials for the network. Being the main production arm of Adult Swim, the division started as Ghost Planet Industries, named after the home planet of the titular character of their first production, Space Ghost Coast to Coast.

== Paramount International Networks ==
=== Rainbow S.p.A. ===
In February 2011, Viacom purchased a 30% ownership stake in the Italian animation studio Rainbow S.p.A. for 62 million euros (US$83 million). Since then, the studio has collaborated with ViacomCBS' other company, Nickelodeon, on multiple shows, including Winx Club and Club 57. Paramount Global sold its 30% stake in the studio in 2023.
