= Fairview (TV series) =

American adult animated satirical sitcom

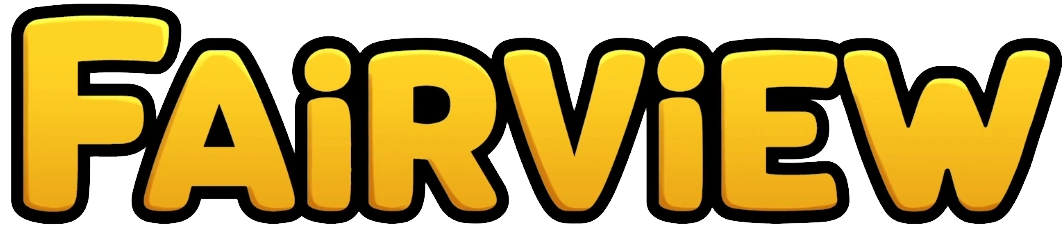
- Genre: Animated sitcom; Comedy; Satire
- Created by: R. J. Fried
- Written by: R. J. Fried
- Voices of: Marina Cockenberg; Aparna Nancherla; Jack Bensinger; Jeremy Levick; Blair Socci; James Austin Johnson
- Country of origin: United States
- Original language: English
- No. of seasons: 1
- No. of episodes: 8

Production
- Executive producers: R. J. Fried; Stephen Colbert; Chris Licht; Tim Luecke; Kim Gamble; Mike Leech; Zach Smilovitz; Grant Gish
- Producers: Sachi Ezura; Rob Chandler; Michael Stanger
- Running time: 21 minutes
- Production companies: Spartina Productions; Licht Media Solutions; RJ Fried Worldwide; Late Night Cartoons, Inc.; CBS Studios; MTV Entertainment Studios

Original release
- Network: Comedy Central
- Release: February 9 – March 30, 2022

Fairview is an American adult animated satirical sitcom created by R. J. Fried and executive produced by The Late Show host Stephen Colbert.

The show premiered on Comedy Central on February 9, 2022. It received negative reviews from critics, who lambasted the series for its writing, humor, and social commentary, although its animation and voice acting were praised. Although there was no cancellation announcement, the series was not renewed for a second season.

== Synopsis ==
Set in a world populated by anthropomorphic nesting dolls and roly-poly people, the series focuses on how national political issues caused societal problems within the communities through an interaction with the dysfunctional citizens of Fairview, a so-called idyllic small town inhabited with idiotic party people who are willing to urinate in the public and fight in the parking lots. The town is overseen by Kelly Sampson, a former party girl turned mayor (who is not the smartest person in the book), along with her fellow incompetent political figures and their families.

== Cast and characters ==
- Marina Cockenberg as Kelly Sampson
- Aparna Nancherla as Chelsea Hill
- Jack Bensinger as Glen Michaels
- Jeremy Levick as Todd Osterdorff
- Blair Socci as Holly Osterdorff
- James Austin Johnson as Wade Moonman, Pastor Marv
- R. J. Fried as Jake, Principal Dunlap
- Graham Techler as Breckman
- Atsuko Okatsuka as Mary
- Otter Lee as Mack
- Matt Rogers as Luck Dragon
- Lisa Gilroy as Denise, Ashley Osterdorff, Deputy Connie, Cindy
- Joey Romaine as Beef Osterdorff, Simone Hamm, Sammy Sugar
- Carl Foreman Jr. as Sheriff Roger, Dr. Thomas
- Zack Smilovitz
- Mitch Lewis

== Production ==
The series was animated using Adobe After Effects. It was picked up by Comedy Central on October 7, 2021, with a slate premiere for early 2022. On January 27, 2022, it was announced that the series would premiere on February 9, 2022. Only eight episodes were produced.

== Episodes ==
No.	Title	Written by	Original release date	Prod. code	US viewers (millions)
1	"COVID Party"	R.J. Fried	February 9, 2022	101	0.266
Despite a COVID-19 pandemic in Fairview, Mayor Kelly and the gang throw an epic party at Cornpeppers for the Big Game.
2	"Cancel Culture"	R.J. Fried & Mike Leech & Zach Smilovitz	February 16, 2022	102	0.221
Fairview won't cancel their anthem "Baby, Let's Rock!" even though an infamous rock singer, Sammy Sugar, faces harrowing accusations.
3	"Fulfillment"	R.J. Fried & Mike Leech & Zach Smilovitz	February 23, 2022	103	0.120
Due to horrible working conditions at Omni Fulfillment Center, Fairview residents seek more fulfilling opportunities via OnlyFans.
4	"Crime Spike"	R.J. Fried & Mike Leech & Zach Smilovitz	March 2, 2022	104	0.147
After the residents see a crime on TV, Fairview beefs up its local police force with military-grade equipment.
5	"Critical Race Theory"	R.J. Fried & Mike Leech & Zach Smilovitz	March 9, 2022	105	0.148
A prophecy reveals that an approaching meteor is heading for Fairview in the form of three books focusing on critical race theory.
6	"Crypto"	Teleplay by : R.J. Fried & Mike Leech & Zach Smilovitz; Story by : Naima Pearce and R.J. Fried & Mike Leech & Zach Smilovitz	March 16, 2022	106	0.144
Fairview residents hand over their life savings to a magical Luck Dragon promising countless riches for those who invest in cryptocurrency and NFTs.
7	"Climate Catastrophe"	R.J. Fried & Mike Leech & Zach Smilovitz	March 23, 2022	107	0.127
After bizarre weather hits Fairview, leading the students of Fairview High School to protest climate change inaction, influencing Mayor Kelly to become history's greatest activist.
8	"Moral Anarchy"	R.J. Fried & Mike Leech & Zach Smilovitz	March 30, 2022	108	0.140
After Pastor Marv and Mary catch Ashley engaging in deviance inside the church, Mayor Kelly and the gang lead a campaign to bring morality back to Fairview.

== Critical reception ==
Fairview has received negative reviews, with critics lambasting the series for its writing, humor, and social commentary. Nick Schager of The Daily Beast called the show a "tasteless mockery of small-town America" and goes on by saying "[i]ts animation is similarly dreary, with character designs that feature no hands, legs or feet; the bottom of each figure is instead a rounded ball as if everyone were an anthropomorphic round-bottomed dolls [sic] or kids’ punching bag." Maxwell Yezpitelok of Cracked.com derided its writing and humor, saying "[s]hows like Fairview skip ahead to the point where the showrunners are already kind of burned out and grabbing ideas from whatever's on the news, without the benefit of having previously developed strong characters and a distinctive style."
