= Tooning Out the News =

American live-action/animated satirical news television show

- Also known as: Stephen Colbert Presents Tooning Out the News
- Genre: Live-action animation; News/Political satire; Variety
- Created by: Stephen Colbert; R. J. Fried; Chris Licht; Tim Luecke; Zach Smilovitz; Mike Leech
- Voices of: R. J. Fried; Maureen Monahan; Jack Bensinger; Naima Pearce; Ike Ufomadu; Zach Smilovitz; Addison Anderson
- Narrated by: Mitch Lewis
- Theme music composer: Tom Polce
- Country of origin: United States
- Original language: English
- No. of seasons: 3
- No. of episodes: 263

Production
- Executive producers: Stephen Colbert; R. J. Fried; Chris Licht; Tim Luecke
- Producers: Zach Smilovitz; Mike Leech; Nicole Savini; Melanie Loebig; Tiffany Pollard
- Editors: Thomas Berkley; Jesse Millward; Katey Spinner; Melissa Weiss
- Running time: 7–44 min. (seasons 1–2); 21 min. (seasons 3)
- Production companies: Spartina Productions; Licht Media Solutions; RJ Fried Worldwide; Late Night Cartoons, Inc.; CBS Studios; CBS Broadcasting

Original release
- Network: Paramount+
- Release: April 7, 2020 – November 12, 2021
- Network: Comedy Central
- Release: October 5, 2022 – May 3, 2023

Related
- The Colbert Report; The Late Show with Stephen Colbert; Our Cartoon President

Stephen Colbert Presents Tooning Out the News (TOTN) is an American live-action/animated satirical news television show created and executive produced by comedian and The Late Show host Stephen Colbert, R. J. Fried, Chris Licht and Tim Luecke. The series premiered on CBS All Access (now Paramount+) on April 7, 2020. The series received positive reviews and received several award nominations, including two Primetime Emmy nominations and a Writers Guild of America Award nomination.

In March 2021, the show was renewed for a second season starting with an exclusive half-hour special to promote the launch of Paramount+ on March 4, 2021, which was followed by a full premiere on March 9, 2021. On October 4, 2021, it was announced that the short-form episodes would expand to half-hour episodes starting on October 8, 2021, and the show would switch to a weekly format, releasing on Fridays.

On May 18, 2022, Comedy Central picked up the show for a third season renewal consisting of thirteen episodes, which premiered on October 5, 2022. On February 7, 2023, the third season was expanded with twelve additional episodes, including a special coverage based on the 2023 State of the Union Address. However, on May 18, 2023, Comedy Central cancelled the show after airing 23 of 25 episodes of the third season, due to production delays caused by the 2023 Writers Guild of America strike amid the 2023 Hollywood labor disputes.

== Format ==
Describing itself as an animated news program, Tooning Out the News combines live-action and animation and focuses on topical news satire from real-life news stories as well as lampooning current events, political issues, media coverages, social commentaries, pop culture topics, and often aspects of the show itself.

The first season consisted of four main segments, "Big News with James Smartwood," "Inside The Hill," "Hot Take," and "Virtue Signal," which resemble shows seen on cable news channels, plus added interstitial vignettes covering other stories not mentioned in the main segments. Some interstitial vignettes are previewed on The Late Show. The second season was added with two new segments, "The Establishment with Tory Hughes" and "Smart Talk Tonight." "The Establishment with Tory Hughes" and the vignettes were dropped in the third season with a new segment, "Sparks!".

Three of the main segments originally debut on Paramount+ Tuesday through Thursday (the morning after a new The Late Show with Stephen Colbert episode), with the fourth, plus a compilation "Week in Review" show containing all four plus vignettes are released every Friday. In the second season, both short-form episodes expanded to a half-hour, which was released every Friday starting on October 8, 2021, and the series would switch to a weekly format. The third season airs on Comedy Central every Wednesday, following after The Daily Show.

== Cast and characters ==
=== Main ===
- R. J. Fried as James Smartwood
- Maureen Monahan as Kylie Weaver, Sarah Sabo, Nicole Vance
- Jack Bensinger as Tyler Templeton
- Naima Pearce as Tory Hughes
- Ike Ufomadu as Dr. Ike Bloom
- Zach Smilovitz as James Smartwood Jr.
- Addison Anderson as Rich Ballard, Austin Sparks

=== Recurring ===
- Laurel Zoff Pelon as Bonnie Davis
- Jeremy Bent as Teddy Hopper, Jonathan Keene
- Sarah Caldwell as Eleanor Palmer
- Keisha Zollar as Susan Shephard
- Neil D'Astolfo as Peter Womack, Troy Lawson
- Alise Morales as Lila Moreno
- Nathan Min as Brian Min
- Otter Lee as Otter Lin
- Kennedy Baldwin as Morgan Herbert Walker
- Graham Techler as Kenneth Parsons
- Moujan Zolfaghari as Catherine Nadaan
- Niccole Thurman as Jordan Thurman
- Clark Jones as Blake Holliday
- Steph Cook as Charlotte Fitzgerald
- Allison Reese as Lydia Parker
- Ritchie Moriarty as Ted Jaworski
- Jeremy Levick as Jeremy Levy-Levin
- Rajat Suresh as Rajat Mehta
- Mitch Lewis as Announcer

=== Notable guests ===
The show features interviews with newsmakers, journalists, analysts, politicians, activists, and celebrities, including:

- Aasif Mandvi
- A. B. Stoddard
- Adam Pally
- Adam Schiff
- Al Sharpton
- Alan Dershowitz
- Alex Gibney
- Alex Jones
- Alex Wagner
- Alyssa Milano
- André Carson
- Andrew Ross Sorkin
- Andy Slavitt
- Anthony Mason
- Anthony Scaramucci
- Barbara Lee
- Barry Sonnenfeld
- Ben Rhodes
- Ben Smith
- Bill Kristol
- Bob Woodward
- Bomani Jones
- Brian Stelter
- Carl Bernstein
- Carol D. Leonnig
- Cecile Richards
- Charlamagne tha God
- Charles M. Blow
- Chasten Buttigieg
- Chris Hadfield
- Chris Murphy
- Clarence Page
- Clarissa Ward
- Cori Bush
- Cory Booker
- Cornel West
- Cornell Belcher
- Craig Fugate
- Cullen Hoback
- Dan Abrams
- Darren Soto
- David Gregory
- David Ignatius
- David Remnick
- Dean Cain
- Deepak Chopra
- DeRay Mckesson
- Desi Lydic
- Deval Patrick
- Donny Deutsch
- Ed O'Keefe
- Ed Rendell
- Eleanor Clift
- Eleanor Holmes Norton
- Eric Adams
- Eric Swalwell
- Eugene Robinson
- Ezekiel Emanuel
- Fareed Zakaria
- Frank Rich
- Frank Luntz
- George R. R. Martin
- George Will
- Gregory Meeks
- Gretchen Whitmer
- Grover Norquist
- Harry Reid
- Herschel Walker (via phone call)
- H. R. McMaster
- Hillary Rosen
- Howard Fineman
- Huma Abedin
- Ian Bremmer
- Ibram X. Kendi
- Ijeoma Oluo
- Ike Barinholtz
- Jaime Harrison
- Jamaal Bowman
- James Carville
- James Patterson (via phone call)
- Jared Polis
- Jeff Daniels
- Jeff Merkley
- Jeh Johnson
- Jemele Hill
- Jennifer Palmieri
- Jennifer Rubin
- Jessica Yellin
- Jim Sciutto
- Jimmy Gomez
- Joe Arpaio
- John Brennan
- John Dickerson
- John F. Harris
- John Heilemann
- John Hickenlooper
- Jon Meacham
- Jonathan Capehart
- Jonathan Lemire
- Jorge Ramos
- Judy Chu
- Judy Woodruff
- Julian Castro
- Justin Jackson
- Kal Penn
- Kara Swisher
- Karen Bass
- Katie Porter
- Katty Kay
- Ken Burns
- Kirsten Gillibrand
- Lauren Underwood
- Larry Sabato
- Lawrence O'Donnell
- Lawrence Wright
- Linda Sánchez
- Major Garrett
- Malcolm Gladwell
- Marc Lamont Hill
- Marc Veasey
- Margaret Hoover
- Mark Cuban
- Mark Hamill
- Mark Takano
- Matt Bai
- Matt Schlapp
- Maxwell Frost
- Mazie Hirono
- Mehdi Hasan
- Michael Bennett
- Michael Beschloss
- Michael Cohen
- Michael Isikoff
- Michael Lewis
- Michael Steele
- Mike Levin
- Molly Ball
- Nate Silver
- Neera Tanden
- Nicholas Kristof
- Nikki Glaser
- Nikole Hannah-Jones
- Nicole Perlroth
- Nina Turner
- Norman Lear
- Olivia Nuzzi
- Orna Guralnik
- P. J. O'Rourke
- Padma Lakshmi
- Patrick Radden Keefe
- Paul Krugman
- Pete Buttigieg
- Pete Souza
- Peter Bergen
- Phil Murphy
- Philip Rucker
- Pramila Jayapal
- Preet Bharara
- Rainn Wilson
- Raja Krishnamoorthi
- Randi Weingarten
- Raul Ruiz
- Reza Aslan
- Richard N. Haass
- Richard Wolffe
- Rick Gates
- Rick Klein
- Rick Tyler
- Rick Wilson
- Ritchie Torres
- Ro Khanna
- Rob Reiner
- Robert Draper
- Robert Reich
- Ronan Farrow
- Rosa DeLauro
- Ross Douthat
- Roy Wood Jr.
- Ruben Gallego
- Rush Limbaugh (via archive recordings)
- Salman Rushdie
- Samantha Power
- Sara Jacobs
- Sarah McBride
- Sebastian Junger
- Shannon Watts
- Sharice Davids
- Sheldon Whitehouse
- Sheryl Lee Ralph
- Stanley A. McChrystal
- Steven Clemons
- Steven Rattner
- Susan Page
- Symone D. Sanders
- Tara Palmeri
- Taylor Rooks
- Thomas Friedman
- Tiffany Cross
- Tiffany Haddish
- Tig Notaro
- Tina Smith
- Tony Cárdenas
- Touré
- Van Jones
- Vivek Murthy
- Vivek Ramaswamy
- Walter Isaacson
- Wesley Clark
- Weijia Jiang
- Wes Moore
- William Barber II
- Willie Geist
- Yamiche Alcindor
- Ziwe Fumudoh

== Episodes ==
=== Series overview ===
| Season | Episodes | Originally released | | |
| Season | Episodes | First released | Last released | Network |
|---|---|---|---|---|
| 1 | 112 | April 7, 2020 | December 11, 2020 | CBS All Access |
| 2 | 121 | March 9, 2021 | November 12, 2021 | Paramount+ |
| 3 | 23 | October 5, 2022 | May 3, 2023 | Comedy Central |

=== Notable episodes ===
- From August 18 to 20, 2020, the show covered the 2020 Democratic National Convention. It also covered the 2020 Republican National Convention from August 26 to 28, 2020.
- From November 1 to 3, 2020, the show also covered the 2020 United States presidential election.
- On April 28, 2021, the show also covered the 2021 joint session of the United States Congress.
- On November 9, 2022, the show also covered the 2022 United States midterm elections.
- On February 8, 2023, the show also covered the 2023 State of the Union Address.
- On March 22, 2023, the show also covered the live report at 2023 Conservative Political Action Conference.

== Production ==
=== Development ===
The show was originally set to premiere on March 16, 2020, but production was delayed due to the COVID-19 pandemic. The show was debuted on April 7, 2020, instead, after production continued via remote work, with animators and showrunner RJ Fried, who has also produced The Late Show and Showtime animated series Our Cartoon President, working via Zoom and Slack.

On October 4, 2021, both short-form episodes would expand to a half-hour starting on October 8, 2021, and the show would switch to a weekly format.

On March 29, 2022, co-creators and co-executive producers Mike Leech and Zach Smilovitz renewed their overall deal at CBS Studios, initially signed in 2020, where they will continue to write and produce across all platforms. On May 18, 2022, the show would move to Comedy Central as part of its adult animation push, with Paramount+ will simultaneously serve as its streaming home.

On September 29, 2022, the animation staff at Tooning Out the News publicly voted to join a union with The Animation Guild, IATSE Local 839, making them the second group of animation workers and production staff in New York to vote in favor of unionizing. At the same time, the guild is generally submitting a letter for voluntary recognition to CBS Eye Animation Productions, an animation studio division of CBS Studios.

=== Animation ===
The show is produced by "The Late Show"'s animation studio, Late Night Cartoons, Inc., which was inspired by the idea of parodying an animated version of the popular cable news program. The concept of the show gradually took shape with the help of short clips that featured animated cartoon pundits on "The Late Show". On a parallel track, the animated anchors and correspondents, designed by "The Late Show"'s character animator Tim Luecke, David Saracino, Scott Brundage, and Charlie Cooper, were interviewed by a range of guests while working to produce the segments for the week. Originally, the show's production used motion capture to "record" the actors' performances on the show, after converting David Letterman's old personal screening room at the Ed Sullivan Theater as a control room.

After the pandemic forced animators to work from home, they switched to remote production, shipping equipment to animators' houses and using Adobe Character Animator to animate the show's virtual hosts, which allowed guests to interact with the show’s animated hosts and panelists in real-time. While the show usually takes months to produce, an episode of Tooning Out the News is turned around a few days before airtime for the concept to stay current, with the topical productions and real-time animation works done remotely.

The pandemic also forced producers to find a remote solution for guests, who were set to be filmed in the studio. Because the show's back-and-forth banter required low latency, producers partnered with The Video Call Center to handle the acquisition and quality control of guest connections. The VCC developed a custom process that enables the show’s animated hosts and correspondents to have topical, live, natural conversations with newsmakers and journalists.

== Reception ==
=== Critical response ===
Tooning Out The News has received critical acclaim from news and television critics for its take on current affairs, hyper-topical coverage, and real-life interviews. It currently holds a 5.6/10 rating on IMDb with 55% of users giving it a positive review, while Rotten Tomatoes score remains hidden, despite several reviews being posted by users. The show has also been featured in numerous publications, including Los Angeles Times, NPR, Comic Book Resources, Mediaite, and The Daily Beast.

=== Accolades ===
The show also garnered nominations for numerous awards, including two Primetime Emmy Award for Outstanding Short Form Comedy, Drama or Variety Series, but eventually lost to Carpool Karaoke: The Series. However, despite being considered for nominations at the 72nd and 75th Primetime Emmy Awards, "Tooning Out The News" was not nominated for Outstanding Short Form Variety Series and Outstanding Scripted Variety Series.

Awards and nominations for Stephen Colbert Presents Tooning Out the News
| Year | Award | Category | Recipients and nominees | Result | Ref. |
|---|---|---|---|---|---|
| 2021 | Critics' Choice Award | Best Short Form Series | Stephen Colbert Presents Tooning Out the News | Nominated | |
| 2021 | Primetime Creative Arts Emmy Awards | Outstanding Short Form Comedy, Drama or Variety Series | Stephen Colbert Presents Tooning Out the News | Nominated | |
| 2022 | Producers Guild of America Awards | Outstanding Short-Form Program | Stephen Colbert Presents Tooning Out the News | Nominated | |
| 2022 | 2022 Webby People's Voice Award | Technical Achievement Video | Stephen Colbert Presents Tooning Out the News | Won | |
| 2022 | Primetime Creative Arts Emmy Awards | Outstanding Short Form Comedy, Drama or Variety Series | Stephen Colbert Presents Tooning Out the News | Nominated | |
| 2023 | Writers Guild of America Awards | Comedy-Variety Talk Series | Addison Anderson, Sarah Caldwell, Stephen Colbert, RJ Fried, Julie Greiner, Mike Leech, Ron Metellus, Bob Powers, Libby Schreiner, Zach Smilovitz, Hannah Wright | Nominated | |

== Media appearances ==
The characters from 'Tooning Out the News' have made appearances on The Late Show with Stephen Colbert and in various marketing campaigns to promote the show. From October 9–10, 2020, the hosts from Tooning Out The News made their appearance at 2020 Just for Laughs Comedy Festival. On February 4, 2021, James Smartwood made his cameo appearance in a marketing campaign for Super Bowl LV commercial to promote ViacomCBS' launch of the rebranded streaming service Paramount+. On July 23, 2021, the hosts from Tooning Out The News also made their appearance along with a special coverage to promote the show during Paramount+'s "Peak Animation" panel at 2021 Comic-Con@Home.
