= Nickelodeon Animation Studio =

American animation studio

Nickelodeon Animation Studios Inc.
- Logo used since 2026

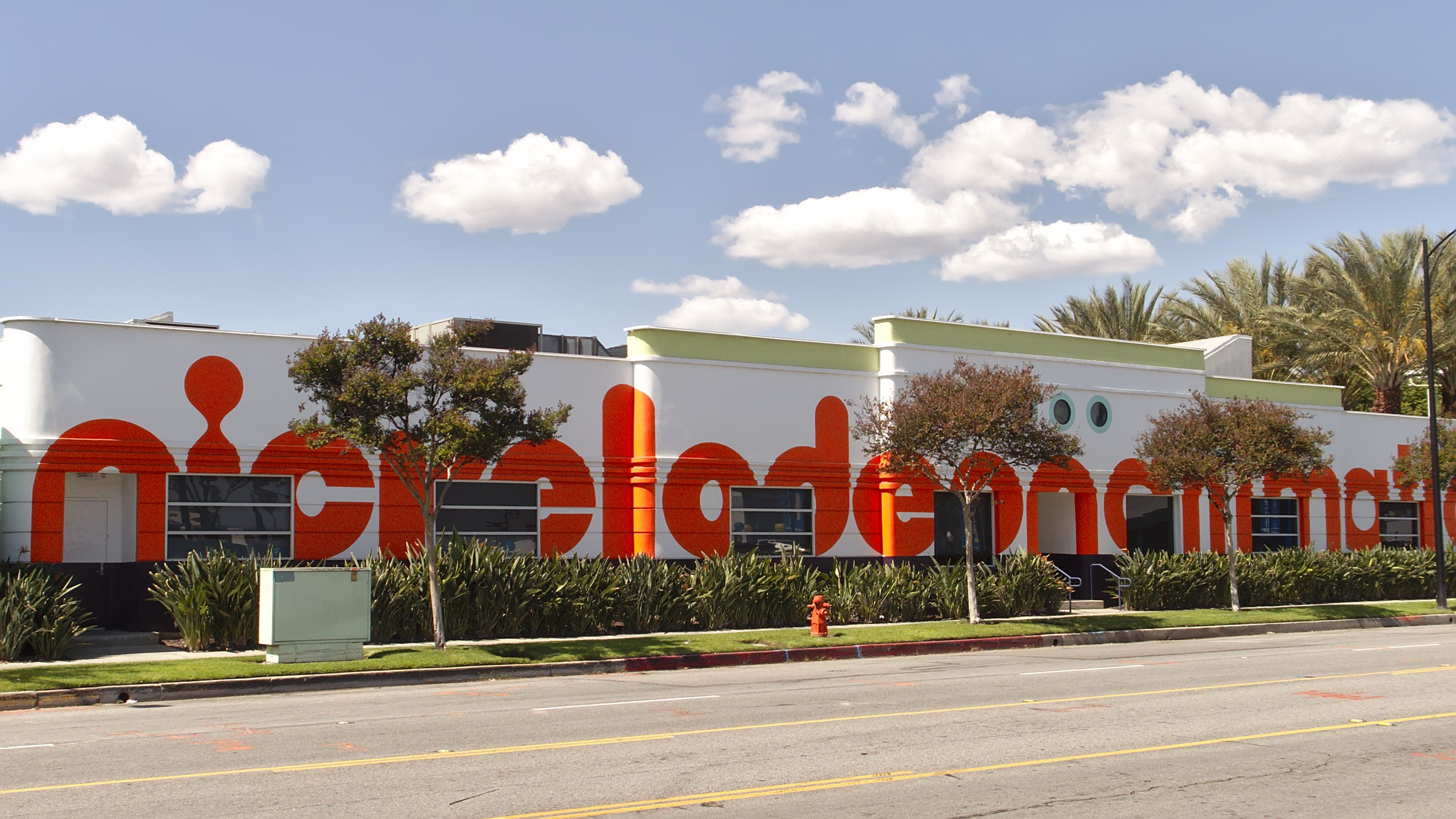
- The Nickelodeon Animation Studio on Olive Avenue in Burbank, California
- Formerly: Games Animation (1992–1998); Nickelodeon Animation Studio (2009–2026)
- Type: Label
- Industry: Animation
- Founded: 1992; 34 years ago
- Founders: Vanessa Coffey; Mary Harrington
- Headquarters: Studio City, Los Angeles, California, U.S. (1992–1998); 231 West Olive Ave, Burbank, California, U.S. (1998–present); 1515 Broadway, New York City, New York, U.S. (second facility, 1999–present)
- Products: Television; Movies
- Owner: Skydance
- Parent: Nickelodeon (1992–2022); Paramount Pictures (2022–2026); CBS Studios (2026); Skydance Television Animation (2026–present)
- Divisions: Avatar Studios; Nickelodeon Digital
- Website: nickanimation.com (archived)

Nickelodeon Animation Studios Inc. is an American animation studio owned by Skydance via Skydance Television Animation. It has created original animated television programs for Nickelodeon, Nicktoons, and Nick Jr., such as SpongeBob SquarePants, Dora the Explorer, and Avatar: The Last Airbender, among various others. Since the 2010s, the studio has also produced its own series based on pre-existing IP purchased by Skydance Corporation, such as Teenage Mutant Ninja Turtles and Winx Club. In November 2019, Nickelodeon Animation Studio signed a multiple-year output deal for Netflix, which included producing content in both new and preexisting IP for the streaming platform, while also doing so for Paramount+.

The studio was founded in 1992 under the name Games Animation Inc. as a subsidiary of a pre-existing company named Games Productions (now known as Nickelodeon Productions). Subsequently, it began work on the first fully in-house Nicktoon, Rocko's Modern Life. In 1998, the studio moved from Studio City, California to Burbank with the construction of a new facility and was renamed as Nickelodeon Animation Studio. It was renamed to Nickelodeon Animation Studios upon becoming a label of CBS Studios in 2026. In 1999, a second facility in New York City was opened, named Nickelodeon Animation Studio New York.

== History ==
An official timeline of Nickelodeon Animation Studio's productions (as well as Nicktoons produced by other studios), posted in 2022.

=== 1990–98: Precursors and origin ===
Nickelodeon Animation Studios' beginnings lie in the roots of the channel's Nicktoons endeavor. In 1990, Nickelodeon hired Vanessa Coffey as a creative consultant to develop Nicktoons, providing her with the task of seeking out new characters and stories that would allow the channel a grand entrance into the animation business. The high cost of high-quality animation had discouraged the network from developing weekly animated programming. Although most television networks at the time tended to go to large animation houses with proven track records to develop Saturday-morning series, often generally pre-sold characters from movies, toys or comics, Nickelodeon desired differently. Inspired by the early days of animation and the work of Bob Clampett, Tex Avery and Chuck Jones, Nickelodeon set out to find frustrated cartoonists swallowed up by the studio system. Nickelodeon president Geraldine Laybourne commissioned eight six-minute pilots at a cost of $100,000 each before selecting three. Seeking the most innovative talents in the field, the products of this artists' union – Doug, Rugrats and The Ren & Stimpy Show – represented twelve years of budget-building toward that end. Coffey was hired as Nickelodeon's Executive Producer of Animation between the pilots and series production. The Nicktoons were produced by external studios, Jumbo Pictures, Klasky Csupo and Spümcø, with oversight from Nickelodeon. However, this method of production led to both Spümcø and Jumbo Pictures having strained relationships with the network, with only Klasky Csupo retaining a relationship with the network for more than a decade.

In fall 1992, the studio fired John Kricfalusi and Spümcø from The Ren & Stimpy Show. Coffey asserts that John was in breach of contract for not delivering on time, creating disturbing content and going over budget. Kricfalusi suspected the real reason was that the network was uncomfortable with more crude humor. Nickelodeon objected to numerous proposed plotlines and new characters—including George Liquor, an Archie Bunker-ish "All-American Male". After missing several promised new-episode delivery and air dates, Nickelodeon's parent company MTV Networks—which had acquired the rights to the Ren & Stimpy characters from Kricfalusi—negotiated a settlement with him. The creative tug of war was closely watched by both animators and the television industry and covered in the national press. In response, Nickelodeon formed Games Animation, located in an office building in Studio City, California, and immediately moved the series' production there. Games hired as much personnel from Spümcø as possible and put the show under the creative supervision of Bob Camp, one of Kricfalusi's former writer-director partners. This period was considered to be a great decline in quality for the series, which would eventually be cancelled in 1995. Coffey soon stepped down as animation vice president for Nickelodeon, to pursue her own projects. She was replaced by Mary Harrington, a Nickelodeon producer who moved out from New York to help run the Nicktoons division that was a near-shambles after Kricfalusi was fired.

Nickelodeon's plan was to hire bright, young animators and let them do almost anything they want. In 1992, animator Joe Murray was approached by the studio with intentions of developing a new animated series for Nickelodeon. The series became Games Animation's first in-house production, Rocko's Modern Life, which premiered on the network in 1993. Games worked on the show for three years and employed over 70 people during the course of its run. Executives did not share space with the creative team. The show ended in 1996 as its creator Joe Murray wanted to spend more time with his family.

Following the end of Rocko's Modern Life, Games Animation produced the pilots for Hey Arnold! and CatDog, along with the former's first 26 episodes. The latter was produced by Nickelodeon Animation Studio alongside the former by this point forward.

=== 1998–2007: As Nickelodeon Animation Studio ===
In 1996, Albie Hecht, then-president of Film and TV Entertainment for Nickelodeon, met with Nickelodeon artists for a brainstorming session on the elements of their ideal studio, and, with their feedback (and some inspiration from the fabled Willy Wonka chocolate factory), created "a playful, inspirational and cutting-edge lab which will hopefully give birth to the next generation of cartoon classics." He added, "For me, this building is the physical manifestation of a personal dream, which is that when people think of cartoons, they'll say Nicktoons." Nickelodeon threw a bash to celebrate the opening of the new Nicktoons animation studio on March 4, 1998. During the launch party, a gathering of union labor supporters formed a picket line to protest Nickelodeon's independent hiring practices outside the studio's iron gates.

Located at 231 West Olive Avenue in Burbank, California, the 72,000-square-foot (6,700 m^{2}) facility, designed by Los Angeles architecture firm AREA, houses 200–300 employees and up to five simultaneous productions. It also contains a miniature golf course (with a hole dedicated to Walt Disney), an indoor basketball course/screening room, an artists' gallery, a studio store, and a fountain that shoots green water into the air. The Nicktoons studio houses five, project driven production units. Each has its own color and design environment and includes a living room, writer's lounge, and storyboard conference room. The studio also has a foley stage, a post-production area, sound editing and mixing rooms and an upstairs loft area with skylights for colorists.

In September 1999, Nickelodeon opened a major new digital animation studio at 1633 Broadway in Manhattan. The New York studio primarily took over production of Nick Jr. animated properties. At the same time, the Los Angeles facility animated the intro for The Amanda Show.

In mid-2006, Nickelodeon announced a collaboration with DreamWorks Animation to create shows based on DWA's films. The first DWA co-production was The Penguins of Madagascar, which would eventually premiere in November 2008 (followed by 2011's Kung Fu Panda: Legends of Awesomeness and 2013's Monsters vs. Aliens).

=== 2007–19: Studio collaborations and acquisitions ===
In 2007, Nick launched El Tigre: The Adventures of Manny Rivera (the first Nicktoon created in Adobe Flash) and Tak and the Power of Juju (based on the video game series of the same name). Back at the Barnyard (a spin-off of the theatrical film Barnyard) was released that same year. These shows showed Nickelodeon's increasing willingness to collaborate with a diverse portfolio of companies, with Mexopolis and THQ being examples.

In 2009, Nickelodeon acquired the rights to Teenage Mutant Ninja Turtles from Mirage Studios. In early 2011, Viacom bought 30 percent of the Italian studio Rainbow SpA, the creators of Winx Club. Following both purchases, Nickelodeon Animation Studio began to produce new content for both franchises: a continuation of Winx Club and a reboot series of TMNT. Since they were produced by Nickelodeon Animation Studio, Nickelodeon refers to both continuations as official Nicktoons.

By 2013, Nickelodeon's deal with DreamWorks Animation had reached an end; according to Bob Schooley, Nickelodeon Animation expressed a desire to refocus on "more Nickish shows". Looking for original concepts, Nickelodeon Animation Studio created the Nickelodeon Animated Shorts Program, under which it would produce new animated shorts with the potential to turn into whole shows. A select few were greenlit and premiered within the following years.

In 2016, Nickelodeon's Burbank animation facility moved into a five-story glass structure that is part of a larger studio complex. The move was intended to bring animated productions currently produced elsewhere in Southern California under a single production facility. Because it houses both animated and live-action productions, the Burbank location has been renamed to simply "Nickelodeon Studios" (which is not to be confused with the original Nickelodeon Studios at Universal Studios Florida, which closed in 2005). The studio also houses the Nickelodeon time capsule, first buried in Orlando, Florida in 1992 at the original Nickelodeon Studios and later at the Nickelodeon Suites Resort in 2006, which has moved to the new studio by the latter's closure and rebrand on June 1, 2016. The capsule is set to be opened on April 30, 2042. The new studio opened on January 11, 2017.

=== 2019–present: Expanding brands ===
In October 2018, Brian Robbins became president of Nickelodeon. In November, he appointed Ramsey Ann Naito as head of animation at Nickelodeon; she was later promoted to president of Nickelodeon Animation Studio in 2020. In both roles, Naito reported to Robbins. Under Robbins' presidency, Nickelodeon began to focus more on expanding some its preexisting franchises. At Nickelodeon Animation Studio, this effort encompassed continuations for legacy shows, including Rocko's Modern Life: Static Cling and Invader Zim: Enter the Florpus for Netflix and a CGI reboot of Rugrats for Paramount+. The first-ever SpongeBob spin-offs (Kamp Koral: SpongeBob's Under Years and The Patrick Star Show) were also produced. The studio also collaborated with corporate sibling CBS Eye Animation Productions to produce Star Trek: Prodigy. In 2021, Avatar Studios, a division of Nickelodeon Animation dedicated to producing projects from the Avatar: The Last Airbender franchise, was launched. In 2023, the studio signed a first-look deal for animated series and features with Lion Forge Entertainment.

In April 2026, Paramount Skydance announced that Nickelodeon Animation Studio would no longer operate as a separate entity and would become the kids and family animation label of CBS Studios, being renamed to Nickelodeon Animation Studios.

In November 2026, Skydance announced the formation of Skydance Television Animation which would include NAS as part of the unit alongside sister studios Williams Street, Cartoon Network Studios, Warner Bros. Animation and Hanna-Barbera Studios Europe. Cartoon Network and Adult Swim president Michael Ouweleen would be promoted as the president of the combined division with Peter Girardi and Botnick overseeing content across all four labels.

== See also ==
- List of animation studios owned by Skydance
  - Nickelodeon Movies
  - Paramount Animation – animation division of Skydance Corporation's film studio, Paramount Pictures
  - MTV Animation – animation division of fellow Skydance Corporation's MTV Entertainment Studios
  - CBS Eye Animation Productions – the animation division of CBS Studios
  - Rainbow S.p.A. – Italian animation studio co-owned by Skydance Corporation from 2011 until 2023
