= Breaking news =

Current issue that has to be reported

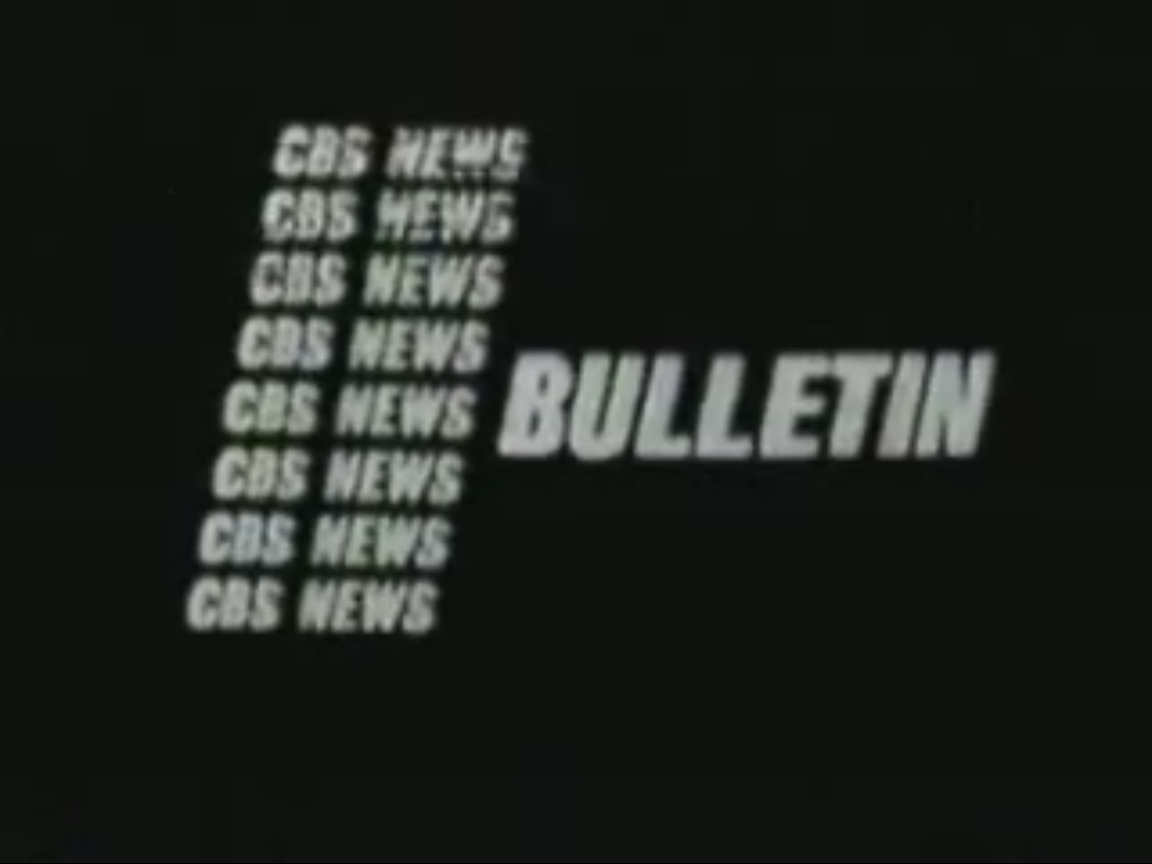
Graphic used by CBS News on the day of the assassination of John F. Kennedy, an event which elicited nationwide coverage requiring numerous stations to interrupt programming.

Breaking news, also called late-breaking news, a special report, special coverage, or a news flash, is a current issue that warrants the interruption of a scheduled broadcast in order to report its details. News broadcasters also use the term for continuing coverage of events of broad interest to viewers, attracting accusations of sensationalism.

== Formats ==
Breaking news has been common to American mass media culture since the 1930s, when the mass adoption of radio allowed the public to learn about new events without the need to print an extra edition of a newspaper.

History

The early 2000s introduced major changes to breaking news through digital journalism and continuous news streams and expanding online news outlets. News organizations transformed their sense of urgency and newsworthiness through the creation of the 24-hour news cycle, which cable networks started before web-based platforms expanded it. The shift of news into an endless cycle caused scholars to observe that breaking news alerts became more common for stories of different importance to keep audiences engaged.

=== Television ===
When a news event warrants an interruption of current non-news programming (or, in some cases, regularly scheduled newscasts), the broadcaster will usually alert all of its affiliates, telling them to stand by for the interruption. The network's feed will then switch to a countdown sequence, to allow any affiliated stations to switch to the network feed. If a national network newscast is in progress when the breaking news event occurs, the newscast will pause temporarily to allow other network affiliates to join the feed. There is then an opening graphic, with a distinctive music cue. The open is followed by the introduction of a news anchor, who welcomes the viewer to the broadcast and introduces the story at hand. Lower thirds and other graphics may also be altered to convey a sense of urgency. In recent years, major networks such as NBC have begun using "Special Report" tickers for select breaking stories during regularly scheduled programming, lessening the need for cut-ins.

Depending on the story being followed, the report may last only a few minutes or continue for multiple hours or with the longest uninterrupted news events, four days – at a time (events in which the latter instances has occurred include the assassination of John F. Kennedy and the September 11 attacks, which took place between November 22–26, 1963 and September 11–15, 2001, respectively). If coverage continues for an extended amount of time, the network may integrate analysis about the story through analysts in-studio, via phone, satellite, broadband (B-GAN) or through other means of communication. Depending on the severity of the event, regular commercial advertising may be suspended entirely for sustained coverage. Network affiliates will be required to insert their station identification in at the top of the hour overlaid during the report rather than through the usual means of a station imaging promo or program reminder.

Breaking news reports are often incomplete because reporters have only a basic awareness of the story. For example, major American broadcast networks analyzed the search warrant affidavit related to the FBI search of Mar-a-Lago in real time, while on the air, breaking into programming immediately after the document was released. The Radio Television Digital News Association (RTDNA) maintains a list of guidelines for broadcasters reporting breaking news.

==== Talking heads ====
Breaking news reports often face the same problems in reporting: no footage of the incident, no reporters at the scene, and little available information. To be able to report on current affairs despite this, many networks either employ full-time (typical in the United States) or contact freelance (typical in the United Kingdom) experts and pundits to be "talking heads". These people have either experience or expertise and are considered reliable by the general public. They have been common on television and can also appear on radio.

In the United States, the competitive nature of commercial networks has allowed for pundits to develop their skills and dedicate themselves to respond to breaking news with analysis in a variety of fields, most often political. These talking heads can be paid millions to work exclusively for a network. In the United Kingdom, TV talking heads are sometimes considered filler who talk around the subject. They are not full-time employees of networks and are not always paid – when they are it is a flat fee for the slot – and will be urgently called in to discuss the relevant field (in which they will typically work full-time). Pundits in the UK have said that they do it because they deem it important to get expert coverage of breaking news, and because it can put their field (and themselves) in the spotlight. Research has suggested that talking heads in the United States are more likely to be partial than talking heads in the United Kingdom.

In 2015, the Financial Times suggested that with modern technological developments broadening news coverage, and with networks opting to show "livelier" non-expert comments from social media more, the need for talking heads may be shrinking.

=== Radio ===
National news that is broadcast over a radio network requires constant monitoring by station employees to allow the network coverage to air, although many stations will take a signal sent by the network and break into programming immediately. In the United Kingdom, Independent Radio News provides special alarm systems specifically to notify its affiliates of deaths in the British royal family, mandating their participation in heavily coordinated mourning protocols (such as "Operation London Bridge") that are practiced by the government and broadcasters.

=== Mobile phones ===
Smartphone users who have mobile apps for news may choose to receive push notifications about news updates. In 2016, the Pew Charitable Trusts conducted a survey and found that 55% of U.S. smartphone users received news alerts, although only 13% of users reported receiving them "often". The New York Times split its push notifications into "Breaking News" and less urgent "Top Stories" in 2016, after modifying its email lists in the same way. National Public Radio increased its push notifications significantly in 2018, notifying app users about both breaking news and programming information, to mixed reactions from its audience. The Columbia Journalism Review found in a 2017 study that 43% of news apps' push notifications were not related to breaking news. The social media platforms, especially Twitter, have revolutionized the way breaking news spreads through real-time updates from journalists and eyewitnesses. The immediate nature of this process enables information to appear online before traditional news verification and reporting processes take place in organizations.

== Usage ==
News bulletins have been a fixture of radio broadcasting since the 1920s. Examples of early news bulletins in the Golden Age of Radio include fictionalized versions in the 1938 radio drama The War of the Worlds and coverage of the attack on Pearl Harbor, which was also the first television news bulletin, reported on stations in New York and Pennsylvania. KTLA in Los Angeles is credited with being the first television station to provide extended coverage of a breaking news event: for 27½ hours from April 8 to 9, 1949, the station carried live coverage of an attempt to rescue three-year-old Kathy Fiscus, who had fallen down an abandoned well in San Marino, California, where she ultimately perished due to asphyxia from a lack of oxygen.

Before 24-hour news networks existed, programming interruptions were restricted to extremely urgent news, such as for the assassination of U.S. President John F. Kennedy in 1963. Such breaks are now common at 24-hour news channels, which have an anchor available for live interruption at any time.

Another type of breaking news is for severe weather events. In North America until the 1990s, television and radio stations normally only provided long-form weather coverage during immediate, ongoing threats, such as a tornado or a landfalling hurricane. Cut-ins and alert crawls during regular programming were used otherwise, even when higher-end alerts such as tornado warnings were issued. Advancements in newsgathering and weather technology (including the deployment of helicopters to provide aerial coverage and radar systems that can detect specific storm attributes), coupled with a few highly life-threatening events during the 1990s (such as Hurricane Andrew and the 1999 Oklahoma tornado outbreak) and the resulting heightened urgency to advise those in the storm's path to take safety precautions in advance made extended (or "wall-to-wall") weather coverage once a high-end alert is issued more common in storm-prone areas, with cut-ins only being used in weather events of lesser severity.

Not all viewers agree that stories labeled as "breaking news" are urgent or important. CNN chairman and CEO Chris Licht wrote upon assuming the position in 2022, "It has become such a fixture on every channel and network that its impact has become lost on the audience." To address this, he began limiting CNN's use of the term only to stories of utmost importance.

Challenges in digital age

Social media platforms, together with user-generated content, have rapidly accelerated the spread of breaking news throughout the digital revolution. News dissemination at high speed through modern media channels has established major challenges for verifying misinformation. News organizations require time to verify content through their editorial standards, but Twitter, Facebook, and TikTok allow unverified information to spread rapidly in real time. News organizations face immediate pressure to publish news, which leads to the premature release of unverified information. Newsrooms have developed extensive verification procedures that employ digital authentication tools to authenticate eyewitness reports and visual materials. News distribution changes, according to media scholars, have forced journalistic standards of credibility to face challenges because of the need for immediate reporting.

== Criticism ==
In early coverage of a breaking story, details are often inaccurate or incomplete. For example, during the Sago Mine disaster in 2006, there were initial reports that 12 of the 13 miners were found alive, but news organizations later learned that only one actually survived.

Some commentators question as to whether the use of the term "breaking news" is excessive, citing occasions when the term is used even though scheduled programming is not interrupted. For example, an evening broadcast may begin with "Breaking news as we come on the air" to cover a story that has been covered by other broadcasts repetitively within the last 24 hours.

In June 2013, Fox affiliate WDRB in Louisville, Kentucky gained notice in the television industry for a promo that criticized the broad and constant use of the "breaking news" term, explaining that it has been overused as a "marketing ploy" by other news-producing stations, who tend to apply the term to stories that are low in urgency or relevance. To coincide with the promo, on its website, WDRB posted "Contracts" with its viewers and advertisers, with the former list promising to use "breaking news" judiciously (applying it to stories that are "both 'breaking' and 'news'").

In June 2022, CNN chief Chris Licht oversaw the addition of guidance regarding the use of "breaking news" to the network's style guide. Licht, who took over leadership after the recent merger of its parent company WarnerMedia with Discovery Inc., argued in an internal memo that overuse of the term by news channels had made it lose its impact among viewers, and that "We are truth-tellers, focused on informing, not alarming our viewers."
