= Swooning the Swooners =

- Directed by: Connie Rasinski
- Story by: John Foster
- Produced by: Paul Terry
- Music by: Philip A. Scheib
- Color process: Technicolor
- Production company: Terrytoons
- Distributed by: 20th Century Fox
- Release date: September 14, 1945
- Running time: 6:29
- Language: English

Swooning the Swooners is a 1945 short animated film produced by Terrytoons and distributed by 20th Century Fox. It is among the Terrytoons films made during the studio's color era.

== Plot ==
One night in a city, numerous animals, mostly cats in saddle shoes, line up to watch a concert. The star of the event is a cat named Frankie. The cat sings a lullaby-style song of moderate tempo. Some of the cats fall off the stands because of their affection for the singer.

In a house in the vicinity, a white cat watches the performance through an open window. Lying in bed only a few feet away is Farmer Al Falfa who is the cat's master. The man, not liking the song, gets up and closes the window. The white cat, however, heads to the living room downstairs, and turns on a radio before she selects a station that plays the song. Al Falfa rushes to the living room, turns off the radio, and places the white cat outside. Without her master knowing, the white cat reenters the house through an open window, and hides under a chair. As Al Falfa is heading back to the bedroom, a pack of mice gather at the living room, and play the cat's song on the radio. The man returns downstairs, sweeps away the mice and smashes the radio.

Al Falfa is back in his bedroom trying to sleep, but he can still hear the cat's live performance, so he leaves the house with a rifle, aims his weapon, and pulls the trigger. The gun does not fire, so he resorts to picking up a tomato which he hurls. The cat is struck head on, and falls unconsciousness. The cats, who are most shocked, rush to check on their idol. Enraged, they begin to chase and throw stuff at the man.

After a chase, Al Falfa makes it safely home. To prevent the angry cats from breaking in, he seals every door and window with lumber, only for the white cat to come out from behind the chair along with three kittens who resemble the singer cat. The three kittens, in their squeaky voices, sing the singer's song. The man is driven to insanity as he cartwheels into his backyard and falls into the well.
