= Our Cartoon President =

American animated satirical television series

- Genre: Animated sitcom; Political satire; Workplace comedy
- Created by: Stephen Colbert; Chris Licht; Matt Lappin; Tim Luecke; RJ Fried
- Voices of: Jeff Bergman; Cody Lindquist; Gabriel Gundacker; Emily Lynne; Griffin Newman; John Viener
- Ending theme: "Donald Trump is the President" by Gabriel Gundacker (episodes 1–45); "Donald Trump was the President" by Gabriel Gundacker (episode 46)
- Composer: Gabriel Gundacker
- Country of origin: United States
- Original language: English
- No. of seasons: 3
- No. of episodes: 46 (list of episodes)

Production
- Executive producers: Stephen Colbert; Chris Licht; RJ Fried
- Producer: Tammy Walters
- Editors: Thomas Berkley; Thomas Vogt; Will Velasquez
- Running time: 24–43 minutes
- Production companies: Spartina Productions; Licht Media Solutions; Late Night Cartoons, Inc.; CBS Television Studios; CBS Broadcasting; Showtime Networks

Original release
- Network: Showtime
- Release: February 11, 2018 – November 8, 2020

Related
- The Colbert Report; The Late Show with Stephen Colbert; Tooning Out the News

Our Cartoon President is an American adult animated satirical television series satirizing the first presidency of Donald Trump that premiered on February 11, 2018, and ended on November 8, 2020, on Showtime. The series was created by Stephen Colbert, Chris Licht, Matt Lappin, Tim Luecke, and RJ Fried and is based on a recurring segment from Colbert's late-night talk show The Late Show with Stephen Colbert.

In August 2019, it was announced that the series had been renewed for a third and final season, which premiered on January 26, 2020.

== Premise ==
Our Cartoon President is based on a recurring segment of Stephen Colbert's The Late Show with Stephen Colbert. A workplace comedy taking place in the White House and other Washington, D.C., locations, the show takes a look at the first presidency of Donald Trump, his sycophants, his family members, members of Congress, and cable news-based newscasters and political commentators.

The second season introduces the 2020 Democratic presidential candidates, as the focus of the show shifts to the 2020 election.

== Cast and characters ==
=== Main ===
- Jeff Bergman as Donald Trump, Lou Dobbs, Joe Biden, Bill de Blasio, John F. Kennedy, and Chris Wallace
- Cody Lindquist as Melania Trump and Louise Linton
- William Sadler as John F. Kelly, Jeff Sessions, Mitch McConnell, Wilbur Ross and William Barr
- Emily Lynne as Ivanka Trump, Eric Trump, Karen Pence, Nancy Pelosi, Stormy Daniels, Theresa May, Elizabeth II, and Ann Coulter
- John Viener as Mike Pence, God, and Howard Schultz
- Gabriel Gundacker as Donald Trump Jr., Stephen Miller, Jake Tapper, and Brian Kilmeade
- Griffin Newman as Jared Kushner
- Jennifer F. Jackson as Sarah Huckabee Sanders (episodes 11–46), Maggie Haberman, Kellyanne Conway, and Susan Collins
- Molly Gordon as Sarah Huckabee Sanders (episodes 1–10)
- Jim Santangeli as H. R. McMaster and Fred Trump
- James Adomian as Ted Cruz, Sean Hannity, Alex Jones, Bill Clinton, Rudy Giuliani, Sebastian Gorka, Benjamin Franklin, Mike Lindell, Bernie Sanders, and Elon Musk
- Zach Cherry as Ben Carson, Colin Kaepernick and Evander Holyfield

=== Recurring ===
- Amanda Phillipson as Rachel Maddow and Kimberly Guilfoyle
- Stephen Colbert as Wolf Blitzer and Wilson Livingood (Season 1 premiere and Season 3 premiere)
- Brett Davis as Anderson Cooper
- Katie Rich as Betsy DeVos and Ruth Bader Ginsburg
- Mike Leech as Paul Ryan and Tim Pawlenty
- Anna Eilinsfeld as Ainsley Earhardt and Kristen Welker
- Thomas Whittington as Chuck Schumer, Emmanuel Macron, Tucker Carlson, and Beto O'Rourke
- RJ Fried as Steve Doocy, Vladimir Putin, Chris Cuomo, and Stephen Breyer
- Zach Smilovitz as Steven Mnuchin, John R. Bolton, and Chuck Todd
- Paul Christie as Jim Mattis
- Jen Spyra as Hillary Clinton
- Eliana Kwartler as Angela Merkel, Hope Hicks and Marianne Williamson
- Mike MacRae as Mitt Romney and Joe Manchin
- Matt Rogers as Bill Shine, Pete Buttigieg and Ben Shapiro
- Jack McBrayer as Lindsey Graham
- Alise Morales as Alexandria Ocasio-Cortez
- Godfrey (season 1) as Cory Booker and Barack Obama
- Dean Edwards (season 2–3) as Cory Booker
- Iman Crosson (season 2–3) as Barack Obama
- Bob Powers as Mike Pompeo
- Ben Siemon as Tagg Romney
- Tim Robinson as Brett Kavanaugh
- Joe Cassidy as John Roberts
- Allie Levitan as Elizabeth Warren
- Matthew Piazzi as Jim Acosta and George Stephanopoulos
- Kate Villa as Amy Klobuchar and Elena Kagan
- Yoshi Amao as Shinzo Abe
- Ziwe Fumudoh as Kamala Harris

=== Guest ===
- Arthur Lai as Xi Jinping
- Aaron Landon as Justin Trudeau
- James Monroe Iglehart as Barack Obama (singing)
- Thomas Berkley as Rex Tillerson
- Grace Edwards as Omarosa Manigault Newman and Michelle Obama
- David Slavin as Sean Conley
- Jason Kravits as Michael Bloomberg
- Sam Freed as Ronny Jackson
- Jonathan Van Ness as himself
- Kathryn Allison as Aretha Franklin
- Brian Stack as Ronald Reagan
- John Thibodeaux as Lester Holt
- Michael Shannon as Midterms Trump ad narrator
- Matt Lucas as Boris Johnson
- Nathan Min as Andrew Yang

== Episodes ==
| Season | Episodes | Originally released | |
| Season | Episodes | First released | Last released |
|---|---|---|---|
| 1 | 17 | February 11, 2018 | August 26, 2018 |
| Special | | November 4, 2018 | |
| 2 | 10 | May 12, 2019 | July 14, 2019 |
| 3 | 18 | January 26, 2020 | November 8, 2020 |

== Production ==
=== Background ===
The series is a spin-off from The Late Show with Stephen Colbert and is produced by an animation studio, Late Night Cartoons, Inc., which, since 2016, had featured a series of sketches featuring an animated caricature of Trump designed by Tim Luecke and Rob Chandler, with Cartoon Trump voiced by Brian Stack. The sketches used Adobe Character Animator to allow Colbert to interact with the character in real-time. The character was also featured in an animated short during Colbert's election night special for Showtime.

=== Development ===
Following the online success of the sketches, Late Show showrunner Chris Licht suggested to Tim Luecke and Matt Lappin that they develop the concept into its own television series. In their pitch to Showtime, Luecke and Lappin described the potential series as a look "behind the scenes at the White House" and that their goal would be to "produce it as quickly as we possibly could so that we could begin to keep up with the news cycle".

On July 27, 2017, Showtime announced that it had greenlit an animated series based on the sketches, with Colbert, Matt Lappin, and Chris Licht as executive producers. On December 18, 2017, it was announced that the series would premiere on February 11, 2018. On March 8, 2018, Showtime announced that they were ordering an additional seven episodes of the series that are set to air during the summer of 2018. This order brought the first season's total of episodes up to seventeen. On May 30, 2018, it was announced that the additional seven episodes of season one would premiere on July 15, 2018. On August 22, 2018, it was announced that Showtime had greenlit a midterm elections themed television special from the series titled "Our Cartoon President: Election Special 2018". The episode aired on November 4, 2018, and featured appearances from the cartoon versions of Vladimir Putin, Rudy Giuliani, Bill Clinton, Hillary Clinton, and Barack Obama. On January 22, 2019, it was announced that Showtime had renewed the series for a second season consisting of ten episodes. On January 26, 2020, the first part of the third season was aired, consisting of ten more episodes. On July 29, 2020, Showtime announced in a video that the show would be returning on September 20, 2020, with the second half of Season 3, featuring new characters, such as Cartoon Jill Biden, Cartoon Dr. Anthony Fauci, and Cartoon Andrew Cuomo.

Colbert said during the 2020 presidential election that if Trump won a second term, the series would be renewed for a fourth season. Trump lost the election and the series was cancelled after three seasons, with Colbert and the team moving to other projects. Trump won a second term four years later in 2024. In 2025, Colbert produced a short Christmas video in a similar style, featuring narration by Nick Offerman.

== Release ==
=== Marketing ===
On December 18, 2017, Showtime released the first teaser trailer for the series. On May 30, 2018, a trailer for the additional seven episodes of season one was released. On October 31, 2018, a trailer for the "Our Cartoon President: Election Special 2018" television special was released.

=== 2018 White House Correspondents' Dinner ===
On April 28, 2018, a special three-minute video created by the cast and crew of the series aired during the 2018 White House Correspondents Dinner.

=== Home media ===
On December 18, 2018, the first season was released on DVD by CBS Home Entertainment and Paramount Home Media Distribution featuring all eighteen episodes and the mid-term election special. The release also includes numerous bonus features such as episode commentary tracks, a featurette looking at the animation process, footage from the table read for episode eleven, and clips from The Late Show with Stephen Colbert, Stephen Colbert's 2016 Election Special, and The White House Correspondent's Dinner. The second season was released on DVD on October 13, 2020.

== Reception ==
The first season of Our Cartoon President has been met with a mixed to negative response from critics upon its premiere. On the review aggregation website Rotten Tomatoes, the first season holds a 32% approval rating with an average rating of 5.17 out of 10 based on 25 reviews. The website's critical consensus reads, "Sugar-coated satire, Our Cartoon President wavers between scathing social criticism and softball slings in a way that's as unsatisfying as it is uncomfortable." Metacritic, which uses a weighted average, assigned the season a score of 42 out of 100 based on 11 critics, indicating "mixed or average reviews".

Jack Nevins of The Guardian praised the show, calling it a farce that "nailed the Trump drama," and contrasting the show's surreal workplace comedy approach with the more reality and headline-driven approach of other late night comedy shows. In contrast, USA Today critic Kelly Lawler reviewed Our Cartoon President negatively, describing it as "slight, dated and unsustainable". She also concluded that "Watching one episode is enough to get the point. Watching nine more feels unnecessary." Ben Travers of Indiewire also reviewed the show unfavorably, calling it "a pointless, unfunny drudge" and criticized it for "humanizing" Trump. In a mixed review, Brian Lowry of CNN wrote that "While Our Cartoon President certainly has its moments, the best news for Showtime might be it's only stuck with this experiment in quick-turnaround animation, at least initially, for 10 weeks." He also said that the show suffered from many of the same problems as That's My Bush!, a sitcom produced in 2001 satirizing the presidency of George W. Bush. Matt Wilstein of The Daily Beast was more favorable, writing that "The biggest surprise [of the show] is how hilarious it is" and praising the show for being "remarkably adept at boiling down characters to their core traits, from Trump and his family to members of his Cabinet and Congress to the Fox News personalities he spends most of his day watching".
