= RJ Fried =

American television producer

- Born: Robert J. Fried; 1981 (age 44–45); Philadelphia, Pennsylvania, U.S.
- Education: Harvard University (B.A.)
- Occupations: Comedy writer, producer, performer
- Years active: 2010–present
- Known for: Co‑creator of Our Cartoon President, Tooning Out the News, and creator of Fairview
- Awards: Multiple Primetime Emmy Award nominations; Writers Guild Award winner
- Website: rjfried.com

RJ Fried (born 1981) is an American comedy writer, producer, and performer. He has written for several late-night and satirical television programs and is the co-creator of the animated series Our Cartoon President and Tooning Out the News.

Fried also created the Comedy Central animated sitcom Fairview. He is a multiple Primetime Emmy Award nominee and a Writers Guild Award winner, known for his work on political satire and variety comedy.

== Early life and education ==
Fried was born in 1981 in Philadelphia, Pennsylvania. During his prep school years at Deerfield Academy in Massachusetts, he captained the hockey team and earned All-League honors, also being named a Sports Illustrated/Old Spice Athlete of the Month in 1999. He was drafted by the Florida Panthers in the third round of the 2000 NHL entry draft.

== Career ==
Fried worked in broadcast journalism as a segment producer for MSNBC's The Last Word with Lawrence O'Donnell from 2010 to 2013. He also wrote for Comedy Central's charity special Night of Too Many Stars in 2010 and 2012, earning Primetime Emmy Award nominations for Outstanding Writing for a Variety Special.

In 2013, Fried joined the writing staff of The Late Show with David Letterman on CBS as a writer and occasional performer. After the Late Show ended its run in 2015, Fried wrote for the NBC variety series Maya & Marty in 2016 and began working with comedian Robert Smigel on a series of political satire specials featuring Triumph the Insult Comic Dog. He was a writer and producer on Triumph's Election Special 2016, a satirical election-year special on Hulu that won a 2017 Writers Guild of America Award and earned Fried another Emmy nomination. That same year, he served as head writer for the Comedy Central late-night talk show Problematic with Moshe Kasher.

In 2017, Fried was tapped by Stephen Colbert's production team to work on a new animated satire series for Showtime centered on Donald Trump White House. He co-created the resulting show, Our Cartoon President, with Colbert and others, and served as its showrunner and executive producer during its run from 2018 to 2020.

In 2020, Fried co-created Stephen Colbert Presents Tooning Out the News, a topical animated news parody series, alongside Colbert, Chris Licht, and Tim Luecke. He acted as a showrunner, executive producer, and writer on Tooning Out the News, which launched on the CBS All Access streaming platform (later Paramount+) and features animated anchors lampooning current events. It was nominated for Emmy Awards in 2021 and 2022 for Outstanding Short Form Comedy/Variety Series.

In 2022, Fried created Fairview, an animated adult sitcom that premiered on Comedy Central. He served as a showrunner and voice actor on Fairview, which featured a voice cast including comedians Aparna Nancherla and James Austin Johnson.

== Filmography ==
List of television works, with year, title, role, network, and references
Year	Title	Role	Network	References
2010, 2012, 2015	Night of Too Many Stars	Writer	Comedy Central	
2010–2013	The Last Word with Lawrence O'Donnell	Segment Producer	MSNBC	
2013–2015	Late Show with David Letterman	Writer and Performer	CBS	
2016	Maya & Marty	Writer	NBC	
2016	Triumph's Election Special 2016	Writer and Producer	Hulu	
2016	Triumph's Election Watch 2016	Writer and Performer	Hulu	
2017	Problematic with Moshe Kasher	Head Writer	Comedy Central	
2018–2020	Our Cartoon President	Co‑creator, Showrunner, Executive Producer	Showtime	
2022	Fairview	Creator, Showrunner, Executive Producer	Comedy Central	
2020–2023	Tooning Out the News	Co‑creator, Showrunner, Executive Producer	Paramount+ Comedy Central	
