= Down on the Phoney Farm =

1915 film by Paul Terry

- Directed by: Paul Terry (uncredited)
- Produced by: Edwin Thanhouser
- Color process: Black-and-white
- Production company: Thanhauser Corporation
- Distributed by: Thanhauser Corporation
- Release date: October 12, 1915
- Running time: 2:31
- Country: United States
- Language: English

Down on the Phoney Farm is an American silent short animated film directed by Paul Terry and released by Thanhauser Corporation. Released on October 12, 1915, it marks the debut appearance of the character Farmer Al Falfa who would appear in numerous short films over the following decades.

== Plot ==
Down on the Phoney Farm (1915)

Farmer Al Falfa is sprinkling water on a farmground which momentarily grows a plant that bearfruits a mug of beer. After consuming the beverage, he tries to grow another one. The second plant, however, bearfruits wine in a wine glass with an imp close to it. Feeling that the drink might not be safe, Al offers the glass to his cow. When the cow drinks the wine, the animal turns aggressive and starts chasing Al. Al jumps into and swims in a lake, but the bodacious bovine comes after doing the same. The cow even chases Al across several mountain tops. When Al is back on the plain, a giant flower grows next to him. Al climbs to the top of the flower. The cow checks under the flower but does not notice him before walking out of the picture.
