= Farmer Al Falfa Sees New York =

- Directed by: Paul Terry
- Produced by: J.R. Bray
- Color process: Black and white
- Distributed by: J. R. Bray; Famous Players–Lasky
- Release date: October 9, 1916
- Running time: 6:04
- Language: English

Farmer Al Falfa Sees New York, also called Farmer Al Falfa in New York, is a 1916 American silent short animated film produced by Bray Productions, featuring Farmer Al Falfa. The film is part of the early series to feature the character. The series itself began after a successful pilot film was released a year previously.

The film features Farmer Al Falfa getting involved in a high-stakes poker game, where the other players are trying to cheat.

== Plot ==
Farmer Al Falfa arrives in New York City by taxi. Yards away, a man with binoculars on a rooftop looks for visitors to rob until setting sights on Al. The man phone calls a femme fatale woman and tells her to meet him. The woman finds and invites Al to come with her to a night club.

At the night club, Al and the woman drink some wine. After consuming two glasses, he becomes intoxicated and collapses. While Al is flat on the floor, the woman heads to his bag, and takes some valuables before running off. Coming out of the bag is Al's dog which barks to wake up its master.

Just after exiting the night club, Al, who still has hangover, decides to lay his back on a lightpost. Momentarily, a hefty man comes and greets him. Figuring he has much cash, the hefty man invites and takes Al to the latter's buddies.

Al meets the hefty man's three friends at a poker room who then entice him to a high-stakes poker game. Over the course of the play, Al's stacks of chips become smaller and smaller. One of the poker players then employ an illegal strategy of secretly trying to pass cards to another player. Al, who is suspicious of the game, opens his bag and releases his dog which snatches and brings the cards to him. Al then comes up with a winning combination that garners him all the chips on the table, much to the other players' surprise. The dog then puts out the light, and a brawl erupts. Fortunately for him, Al is able to escape with his winnings.

Riding on a train in style, Al leaves New York City a wealthy man.
