= Zepped =

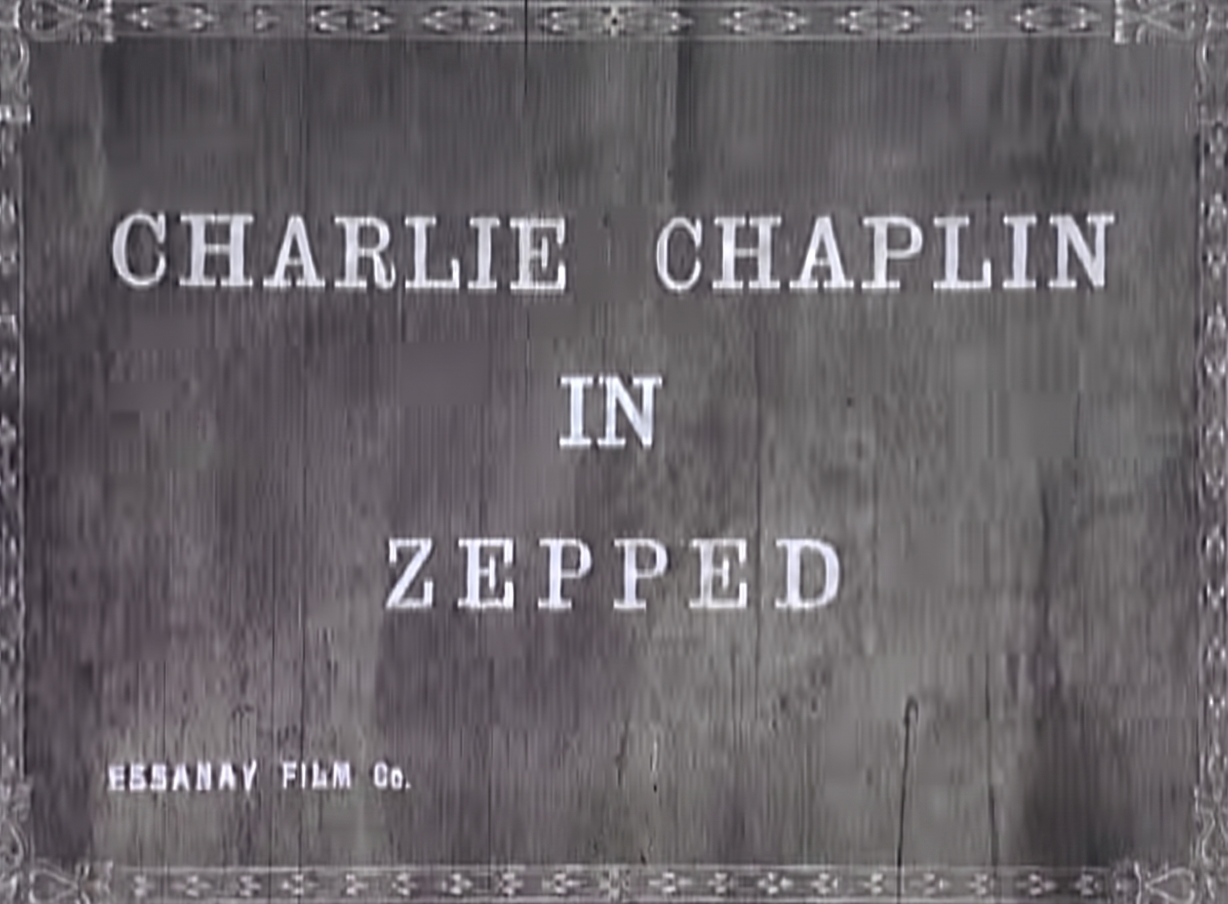
- Title card
- Starring: Charlie Chaplin
- Release date: December 23, 1916
- Running time: "Over six"–seven minutes
- Language: Silent

Zepped is a 1916 propaganda comedy short film about a German Zeppelin attack on London during the First World War. Charlie Chaplin appears in the film, although it is unlikely he himself was involved in the production. Making use of stop-motion animation, Zepped may have used previously-unknown outtakes of three or four earlier Chaplin films: His New Profession (1914), A Jitney Elopement (1915) and The Tramp (1915), and according to Bonhams, By the Sea (1915).

== Plot ==
Charlie Chaplin goes on an espionage adventure. When his neighbor mistakes a passing German Zeppelin for a giant aerial bomb, Chaplin a disguises himself to thwart enemy spies and save the day.

== Cast ==
- Charlie Chaplin as the Tramp

== Unique Reel ==
There is only one copy in existence. It was unknowingly purchased by a collector who bought an old film reel tin on eBay for £3.20 (about $5) in September 2009 and found the nitrate film inside. He put it up for auction in June 2011 but the sole bid did not reach the £100,000 ($160,000) reserve price. The film reel is the original version physically edited by splicing together outtakes of old Chaplin movies and sequences. No other copy is thought to exist.

== Exported to Egypt ==
Although a 1917 advertisement in the Manchester Film Renter announced a trade viewing, it may only have been shown in Egypt. An October 1917 entry in the British Board of Film Censorship's Ledgers says it was "For Export Only", and a Ministry of Interior film censorship certificate displayed at the beginning of the film states it was "Passed for Exhibition in Egypt".
