= Farmer Al Falfa =

Animated character

- Aesop's Fables/Farmer Al Falfa character
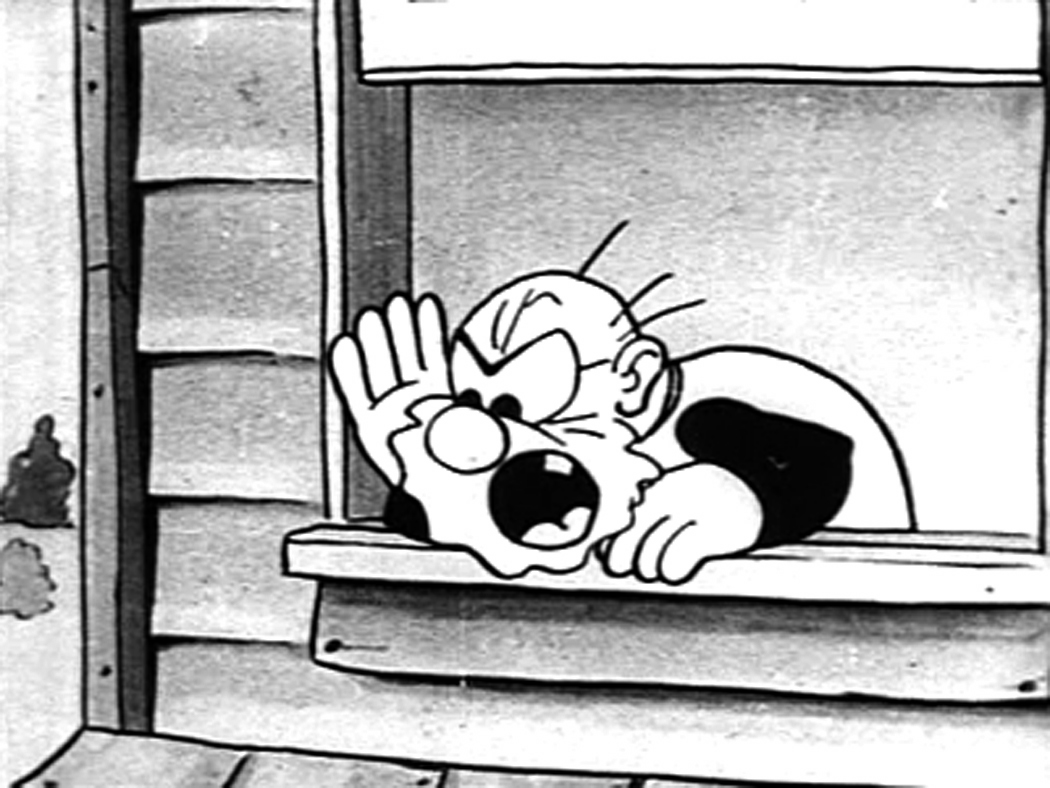
- Farmer Al Falfa in The Iron Man (1930)
- First appearance: Down on the Phoney Farm (1915)
- Created by: Paul Terry
- Voiced by: Roy Halee (1944); Tom Morrison (1959)

In-universe information
- Aliases: Farmer Alfalfa; Farmer Gray (alternative names)
- Species: Human
- Gender: Male
- Occupation: Farmer

Farmer Al Falfa, also known as Farmer Alfalfa, is an animated cartoon character created by American cartoonist Paul Terry. Serving as one of the mascots of Terrytoons, he appeared in numerous cartoons created by the company and its predecessors over an unusually long lifespan of 41 years, having outlived most of its competitors in the silent film era and the golden age of American animation.

== History ==
The Farmer's first appearance in Down on the Phoney Farm (1915)

The character first appeared in Down on the Phoney Farm (1915), a short Terry cartoon distributed by the Thanhouser Company. Next came a series of shorts produced by Terry for Bray Studios, starting with Farmer Al Falfa's Cat-Tastrophe (1916).

After leaving Bray, Terry retained the character, making new shorts for Edison and Paramount over the few years following. Terry then used Farmer Al Falfa frequently during the 1920s for his Aesop's Film Fables series, the character's most prolific period. By this time, the Farmer had been redesigned to allow simplified animation, necessary as the Fables were released by Pathé on a weekly basis. The Farmer's head and arms could be drawn on a separate cel while the rest of his body was drawn on another, a technique anticipating the limited animation of television cartoons. When Terry made the transition to sound, so did the Farmer. The first publicly released sound cartoon, Dinner Time, featured Farmer Al Falfa as an irritable butcher who had to fend off a pack of hungry hounds. The short failed to garner the amount of public interest that occurred following the release one month later of Walt Disney's Steamboat Willie.

In 1929, Terry left his producer, Amadee J. Van Beuren to open his own studio, Terrytoons, with distribution covered by Educational Pictures. The farmer character was revived in 1930, beginning with French Fried, and continuing until 1937, after which the character would appear only irregularly until 1955.

For roughly a year, the farmer continued to appear in Van Beuren's cartoons, then being made by former Terry associates John Foster and Mannie Davis (both of whom would rejoin Terry a few years later). Since the character was established as his own property, Terry threatened legal action against his former producer, Van Beuren, after which the farmer stopped appearing in the Van Beuren films. As Terry's studio began to grow and develop, Farmer Al Falfa wore out his welcome and was subsequently all but retired. The Farmer never entirely disappeared, however. He was featured as a supporting player in the first two Heckle and Jeckle cartoons (1946) and he starred in Uranium Blues (1956) ten years later.

In the early 1950s, the character was unofficially rechristened "Farmer Gray", probably by Fred Sayles, the host of the daily children's program entitled, Junior Frolics, that was broadcast on station WATV in Newark, New Jersey (the television station that would become WNET). Sayles certainly named some of the subsidiary characters (presumably previously nameless), such as the donkey "Bumpy", the cats "Casper" and "Bad Mike", and the mice "Marty" and "Millie".

In the Terrytoons comics of the mid-1950s, the character was briefly rechristened "Farmer Gray", presumably in an effort to capitalize on the popularity of "Junior Frolics" through television, but the renaming in the comics did not last. Its use was inconsistent (sometimes changing from month to month), and by the late 1950s, the original character name had returned to use permanently in the Terrytoons comics.

In the fall of 1958, the white-bearded protagonist starred in the syndicated television program Farmer Al Falfa and his Terrytoon Pals, a compilation of earlier black and white Terry shorts. Although no longer for sale in the mainstream television market, most of the early cartoons, the silent ones in particular, have surfaced on public domain compilations including, most notably, Video Yesteryear's Cartoonal Knowledge VHS series from the 1980s.

In 2024, The Life and Times of Farmer Al debuted on HBO Max, with an introduction hosted by Leonard Maltin, marking the first time his cartoons had been on television since the 1950s.

== See also ==
- Farmer Al Falfa filmography
- Animation Before Hollywood: The Silent Period
- Humbug

== Bibliography ==
- Crafton, Donald (1993): Before Mickey: The Animated Film, 1898-1928. University of Chicago Press.
- Maltin, Leonard (1987): Of Mice and Magic: A History of American Animated Cartoons. Penguin Books.
