= Chris Licht =

American newsman and producer (born 1971)

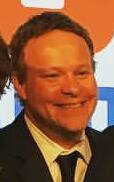
- Licht in 2015
- Born: Christopher Andrew Licht; October 22, 1971 (age 55); Switzerland
- Education: Syracuse University (BA)
- Years active: 1993–present
- Notable work: The Late Show with Stephen Colbert; Our Cartoon President; CBS This Morning Morning Joe
- Spouse: Jenny Blanco (m. 2006)
- Children: 2

Christopher Andrew Licht (born October 22, 1971) is an American television newsman and producer. He is best known as the showrunner and executive producer of The Late Show With Stephen Colbert, as well as CBS's executive vice president of special programming. He is also known for having launched Morning Joe on MSNBC, and the reboot of CBS This Morning. From May 2022 to June 2023 he was the chairman and CEO of CNN.

== Early life and education ==
Licht was born in Switzerland, to Susan Mary (Kneeland) and Dr. Peter David Licht of Newtown, Connecticut. He graduated from Syracuse University's S. I. Newhouse School of Public Communications in 1993 with a bachelor's degree in broadcast journalism and political science. In 2014, one of the TV news control rooms at the Newhouse Studio and Innovation Center was named in his honor.

== Career ==
Licht began his career at KNBC in Los Angeles around the time of the O. J. Simpson trial. He also worked with local NBC affiliates in LA and San Francisco markets.

In 2005, he joined MSNBC as the executive producer for Scarborough Country and later was the founding executive producer of Morning Joe, which he and host Joe Scarborough helped create prior to its launch in 2007.

He joined CBS in 2011 and was named vice president of programming at CBS News. Licht was the executive producer of CBS This Morning starting when the show launched in 2012, and later joined The Late Show with Stephen Colbert in 2016. While in charge of CBS This Morning, he was credited with making the show unexpectedly successful, giving CBS its most competitive place in the morning show race in almost 30 years. This success occurred partly because Licht allowed the show's hosts Gayle King, Charlie Rose, and Norah O'Donnell, to talk freely about news events and about themselves. A month after he was named executive producer and showrunner of The Late Show, the show saw its largest weekly audience since February 19 of that year. As executive producer, he focused on management issues that host Stephen Colbert had previously handled, as well as shortening the opening credits and adding a comedy sketch immediately before them.

=== CNN chairman and CEO ===
After the abrupt resignation of CNN president Jeff Zucker in February 2022, Licht was named his successor on February 26, 2022.

On his first day as chairman and CEO of CNN, Licht sent a memo to all employees saying, "Sadly too many people have lost trust in the news media. I think we can be a beacon in regaining that trust by being an organization that exemplifies the best characteristics in journalism: fearlessly speaking truth to power, challenging the status quo, questioning ‘group-think’ and educating viewers and readers with straightforward facts and insightful commentary, while always being respectful of differing viewpoints. First and foremost, we should, and we will be advocates for truth." One such method involves limiting CNN's use of the term "breaking news" to stories that have a significant importance. Licht has expressed a desire to change negative perceptions of CNN among Republicans.

In late 2022, Licht received criticism as CNN terminated the contracts of several long-time correspondents including Brian Stelter, John Harwood, and Jeffrey Toobin. The Washington Post described the moves "as the latest evidence of a shift to a less politically charged tone under new leader Chris Licht."

Licht was fired as CNN's president and CEO in June 2023 after The Atlantic revealed that employees had become unhappy with him over actions taken during his tenure.

=== Post-CNN ===
Since departing CNN, Licht has kept a low profile. He's done some consulting and taught a class at Syracuse University on the future of media. Licht has not ruled out a return to the media business.

== Awards ==
While Licht was executive producer of CBS This Morning, the series won a Peabody Award and three Emmy Awards (one Daytime Emmy Award and two News & Documentary Emmy Awards). As CBS This Morning's executive producer, he was co-nominated for three Emmy Awards in 2015: one for Outstanding Investigative Journalism in a Regularly Scheduled Newscast, one for Outstanding Feature Story in a Regularly Scheduled Newscast, and one for Outstanding Continuing Coverage of a News Story in a Regularly Scheduled Newscast. The following year, the series won an Emmy for Outstanding Investigative Journalism in a Regularly Scheduled Newscast for a story on fraud at compounding pharmacies, which he co-executive produced with Steve Capus.

== Personal life ==
On April 28, 2010, Licht suffered a near-fatal cerebral hemorrhage while driving in Washington, D.C. He later wrote a book about the resulting experience, What I Learned When I Almost Died: How a Maniac TV Producer Put Down His BlackBerry and Started to Live His Life, which was published in 2011. Joe Biden, the then-vice president and a survivor of an aneurysm himself, cold-called Dr. Vivek Deshmukh, a highly recommended neurosurgeon, to ask him to take care of Licht.

As of 2017, Licht lived in Manhattan with his wife, Jenny Blanco, and their two sons. Blanco worked at CNN for several years as a producer for Anderson Cooper and then as a director of talent recruiting and development. Licht and Blanco began dating while both were on assignment at the 2004 Summer Olympics in Athens. They married in April 2006 at the L'Auberge Del Mar, in Del Mar, California.

== Book ==
- What I Learned When I Almost Died: How a Maniac TV Producer Put Down His BlackBerry and Started to Live His Life. New York: Simon & Schuster. 2011. ISBN 978-1451627671.
