= List of Drawn Together episodes =

Episode list for an animated sitcom

This is a comprehensive list of episodes for the animated television comedy Drawn Together. Each episode (except "Lost in Parking Space, Part One" and "Nipple Ring-Ring Goes to Foster Care") contains at least one musical number that ties into the action of the scene in which it appears. These are either original songs (some parodies of existing songs) sung by the cast (often full-blown production numbers), or outside songs that play during montages. Season 1 premiered on October 27, 2004. Season 3, which consists of fourteen episodes, began airing on October 5, 2006. After a one-year hiatus, season 3 returned on October 4, 2007 with the last episode airing on November 14, 2007. The series finale was released on April 20, 2010. A total of 36 episodes were produced over the series' three seasons.

== Series overview ==
Season	Episodes	Originally released	
Season	Episodes	First released	Last released
1	7	October 27, 2004	December 15, 2004
2	15	October 19, 2005	March 15, 2006
3	14	October 5, 2006	November 14, 2007
Film		April 20, 2010	

== Episodes ==
=== Season 1 (2004) ===
No. overall	No. in season	Title	Directed by	Written by	Original release date	Prod. code
1	1	"Hot Tub"	Peter Avanzino	Matt Silverstein & Dave Jeser	October 27, 2004	101
When eight cartoon characters move into a house together, Clara immediately assumes Foxxy is the servant girl because she’s black. Foxxy decides to open Clara’s mind… and her mouf. Meanwhile, Toot must come to terms with the fact that she wouldn’t be a sex symbol when she falls in love for (gay) Xandir, who repeatedly claims he’s on a never-ending quest to save his girlfriend. Musical number: "Black Chick's Tongue"
2	2	"Clara's Dirty Little Secret"	Dwayne Carey-Hill	Matt Silverstein & Dave Jeser	November 3, 2004	102
Clara reveals that she has a tentacled monster living in her vagina, which, after Toot angers it and eats Wooldoor, it causes the other housemates (except for Foxxy) to attempt to destroy the monster. However, Clara later finds out from her "evil" stepmother (via magic mirror communication) that the only way to break the spell would be able to find her Prince Charming. Meanwhile, Ling-Ling is busy with a load of dirty dishes. Musical number: "La-La-La-La-Labia"
3	3	"Gay Bash"	James Purdum	Elijah Aron	November 10, 2004	103
When the other housemates begin to wonder if Xandir is really gay, their suspicions are confirmed later, and a worried Xandir tries to adjust to life out of the closet; however Foxxy holds a gay bash to force Xandir to admit and embrace his homosexuality. Meanwhile, Spanky forces Ling-Ling into slavery by making bootleg sneakers (using a sewing machine) for an NBA competition. Musical number: "Ling-Ling's Lament"
4	4	"Requiem for a Reality Show"	Ray Claffey	Erik Sommers	November 17, 2004	104
A food competition from the producers leaves half the housemates (Captain Hero, Clara, Spanky and Wooldoor) on the brink of starvation. Toot, on the other hand, gets super big and soon has to overdue weight loss (as told by Xandir) with disturbing psychological results. Meanwhile, Captain Hero begs Foxxy for food, and she responds by taking him to the basement and torturing him, sparking a short-lived romance between them. Plus, a starving and infuriated Spanky bullies Wooldoor, believing that he is the reason for his starvation. Wooldoor is comforted by Clara and her woodland friends, and despite Spanky, on the brink of starvation, destroys the woodland creatures, unknown to Clara. Musical number: "Bully Song"
5	5	"The Other Cousin"	Peter Avanzino	Reid Harrison	December 1, 2004	105
Captain Hero kisses for Clara's mentally retarded cousin, Bleh, who is visiting the house, after Spanky promises to pay him $50 to seduce her. Meanwhile, Ling-Ling is discovered to secrete a hallucinogenic drug when disappointed, and Toot, Xandir and Wooldoor learn what happens when you lick him. Musical number: "You’re My Hero" (background) Guest star: Sarah Silverman as Bleh
6	6	"Dirty Pranking No. 2"	James Purdum	Jordan Young	December 8, 2004	107
Spanky teaches Clara the fine art of pranking the pizza delivery guy, sparking a romantic relationship between the pair (of which Clara's father disapproves). Meanwhile, Xandir is upset when Captain Hero keeps canceling their plans together (due to Captain Hero's heroic duties). Musical number: "The Time of My Life" (Broadcast only), untitled replacement song (DVD only) Guest star: Jonathan Kimmel as The King
7	7	"The One Wherein There Is a Big Twist"	Ray Claffey	Dave Jeser & Matt Silverstein	December 15, 2004	108
Due to the large number of cameras watching them, the housemates grow agitated, realizing that they are not receiving any prize for starring on the show. Toot snaps and complains to the producers; in response to this, the housemates are locked inside the house, but they protest and are subsequently let out. However, the housemates are then dragged into a competition and pitted against each other in a parody of The Apprentice. Foxxy prevails in the end, only for them all to find out that this competition is just a devious plot devised by the most powerful entity of the entire series. In the end, the infuriated housemates hijack a helicopter and blow the house up, but the helicopter is thrown off course and the housemates crash-land on a deserted island. Musical number: "Cash Cash Cashety Cash" (parody)

=== Season 2 (2005–06) ===
No. overall	No. in season	Title	Directed by	Written by	Original release date	Prod. code
8	1	"The One Wherein There Is a Big Twist, Part II"	Dwayne Carey-Hill	Dave Jeser & Matt Silverstein	October 19, 2005	201
Continuing from the last episode, as the helicopter plummets from the sky, Toot is swept out of it and is beached on an island, where the local natives, thinking she is a whale, feed her offerings. Meanwhile, the housemates crash on a "deserted" island, but are rescued and returned to their respective homes, where they find that they have grown used to life with the cameras, and Wooldoor, distraught, supposedly hangs himself, and during his funeral, the remaining housemates return to the ruins of their old home, where the entity from the previous episode says that they can return to the house, although they must find a new housemate. After several auditions, the externally sweet and innocent Strawberry Sweetcake becomes the newest cast member. However, when Wooldoor, having not actually died, returns to the house, he reveals that Strawberry Sweetcake has a dark secret, which Foxxy, using her mystery-solving abilities, proves. Musical number: "Shit Sandwich" (seen only in DVD version)
9	2	"Foxxy vs. the Board of Education"	Raymie Muzquiz	Elijah Aron	October 26, 2005	202
Foxxy's quest to get her detective license leads her towards a conspiracy involving the Board of Education's plans to keep black people from getting a proper education, and so she and Ling-Ling try to bring down the leader of the plot, the literally-named Board of Education (a parody of the character Bill from Schoolhouse Rock!). Meanwhile, Spanky comes down with a computer virus and marries Xandir so he can qualify for health insurance; however, Clara is onto them, believing that if the two marry, the institution of marriage will fall apart, so she contacts the King of Insurance, leading to Spanky and Xandir having to pretend they are legitimately married as to avoid punishment from him. Musical number: "The Board of Education" and "Fire the Load"
10	3	"Little Orphan Hero"	Ray Claffey	Erik Sommers	November 2, 2005	203
After discovering that his supposedly destroyed home planet still exists, Captain Hero contacts and reunites with his parents, who tell him the truth about why he was sent to Earth, mainly because he was apparently predicted to be the lamest superhero ever before being born, causing his parents to have an abortion. Enraged, Captain Hero actually does destroy his home planet, meaning that his heartbroken parents must live with him. Meanwhile, the other housemates start a suicide hotline, although Foxxy initially objects to this. However, the housemates stick to the hotline, before abandoning it to worship a "frog god" for a while, but soon must pay a visit to a disembodied man, who is feeling suicidal, although he is hiding a dark secret. Musical number: "Being a Hero"
11	4	"Captain Hero's Marriage Pact"	Chuck Sheetz	Reed Agnew; Story by : Elliot Blake	November 9, 2005	205
Captain Hero is forced to honor a marriage pact with his old girlfriend, Unusually Flexible Girl; however, when he confesses to her that he does not want to marry her, she soon becomes engaged to Wooldoor, and Captain Hero suddenly aches to have her back. Meanwhile, Foxxy reunites with her band members during a drunken night out, but when she accidentally kills them in a car accident, Foxxy is initially depressed, until Spanky offers to help her regain her fame by recording a song; Foxxy accepts this offer and takes advantage of the deaths of her band members by creating a song based on the car accident. Musical number: "Crashy Smashy Die Die Die" Guest star: John Ondrasik as Captain Hero's Father
12	5	"Clum Babies"	Rich Moore	Jon Kimmel	November 16, 2005	204
After Wooldoor hits puberty and becomes uncontrollably horny, Foxxy teaches him how to masturbate, and using this new knowledge, Wooldoor produces sperm (which take the shape of "clum babies") with magical healing powers—something that Princess Clara vehemently crusades against (mainly by using the VeggieFables, a parody of VeggieTales, to show Wooldoor the error of his ways and teach him the ways of Christianity, which actually works) until she contracts tuberculosis, and becomes desperate to be healed by a clum baby. Now close to death, Clara is dragged to the church that Wooldoor now prays in by Foxxy and Spanky; however Wooldoor is thoroughly convinced of the error of his ways by the VeggieFables, but is forced to produce a clum baby to heal Clara through means of torture from Foxxy and Spanky, causing him to be caught between the conflicting ways of the VeggieFables and his fellow housemates. Meanwhile, Captain Hero and Xandir follow Ling-Ling to a night club, then, the next morning, Ling-Ling is forced into an "arranged battle" by his parents, through which he meets the girl of his dreams. Musical number: "God Is Watching Everything You Do" Guest star: Victor Yerrid as Blind Boy
13	6	"Ghostesses in the Slot Machine"	Tuck Tucker	Bill Freiberger	November 30, 2005	206
When an Indian casino opens up next door, Foxxy opens a strip club (and ends up competing with Clara for her father's love), while Captain Hero takes part in fixed fights at the casino so that he and Spanky can make a profit, until he betrays Spanky by going it alone to make a profit by himself. Musical number: "Lady Luck" Guest star: Jonathan Kimmel as The King
14	7	"Super Nanny"	Peter Avanzino	Matt Silverstein & Dave Jeser	December 7, 2005	207
Captain Hero is disciplined by a reality show nanny. Meanwhile, in order to earn his driver's license, Ling-Ling is advised by Spanky to sell out his Asian heritage by getting cheap surgery to fix his slanted eyes, which he actually does. Musical number: "Who's That Guy?"
15	8	"Terms of Endearment"	Dwayne Carey-Hill	Sam Freiberger and Bill Freiberger	January 25, 2006	106
Captain Hero sacrifices his powers after his X-ray vision turns Foxxy Love into a racial minstrel show-style black stereotype—which gets Foxxy taken away to a prison where all ethnically offensive caricatures are sent to be erased. Musical number: "Shortin' Bread"
16	9	"Captain Girl"	Dwayne Carey-Hill	Jordan Young	February 1, 2006	208
Toot becomes a mother to a baby from Nicaragua; Wooldoor becomes Captain Hero's sidekick. Musical number: "Captain Hero Theme Song" (Parody)
17	10	"A Tale of Two Cows"	Ray Claffey	Dave Lewman & Joe Liss	February 8, 2006	210
The other housemates discover that Wooldoor has been making secret voyages to the Live-Action Forest and has brought back a live-action cow. They convince Wooldoor to take her back to the forest and he does so, but then realizes that he cannot live without her. He then returns to the forest, unknowingly followed by the other housemates, and finds the live-action cow, but he and the other housemates are attacked by the most feared animal in the forest, a live-action squirrel with big balls, but the live-action cow saves them in a battle, but catches rabies from the squirrel, meaning she must be shot, leaving Wooldoor distraught. Meanwhile, Toot fears to go to her fat camp reunion, worried that she will be teased by the bullies at the camp, but then she discovers a video game cheat book for "The Legend of Xandir" in the attic, and uses it to control Xandir so he can accompany her to the reunion. Musical number: "Honey Baked Ham" Guest star: Alex Borstein as Jelly Donuts Leader
18	11	"Xandir and Tim, Sitting in a Tree"	Raymie Muzquiz	Bill Freiberger	February 15, 2006	209
Xandir has a romantic encounter with Tim Tommerson, who appears to be Captain Hero's alter ego; the other housemates plot their vengeance on an Entertainment Weekly writer who panned the show for being offensive and tasteless, which caused Spanky to believe he was the problem and leave the house. Later, episode 214 showed Captain Hero and Tim Tommerson to be different characters. Musical number: "Morning Train" Guest star: Jimmy Kimmel as Entertainment Weekly Critic
19	12	"The Lemon-AIDS Walk"	Tuck Tucker	Erik Sommers	February 22, 2006	212
Captain Hero uses steroids to win the AIDS walk; Spanky convinces Wooldoor to steal candy from the mall. Musical number: "Judge Fudge Power Hour Theme Song" Guest stars: Billy West as Mall Security Guard, Popeye and Stimpy, and Alex Borstein as AIDS Walk Coordinator and Lois Griffin Note: This episode features a guest appearance from Lois and Peter Griffin (although their faces are unseen), two of the main characters in Fox's Family Guy.
20	13	"A Very Special Drawn Together Afterschool Special"	Peter Avanzino	Valerie Ahern & Christian McLaughlin; Story by : Stacey Majers	March 1, 2006	213
The housemates do a role-playing exercise to help Xandir tell his parents (played by Captain Hero and Toot) he is gay, which blows up into a story of seduction, betrayal and redemption. Musical number: "You Belong to the City"
21	14	"Alzheimer's That Ends Well"	Rich Moore	Elijah Aron	March 8, 2006	211
Clara gets an operation (from Wooldoor) to remove her Octopussoir; Toot is sent to a nursing home after the other housemates believe she has Alzheimer's. Musical number: "You'll Really Love Being Abandoned Here" Guest stars: Jimmy Kimmel as Old Man and Debi Mae West as Vajoana
22	15	"The Drawn Together Clip Show"	Dwayne Carey-Hill	Matt Silverstein & Dave Jeser	March 15, 2006	214
The best of the past two seasons in clip show form, as presented by the Jew Producer. Musical number: "Board of Education", "Black Chick's Tongue", "Ling-Ling Lament", "The Bully Song", "God Is Watching Everything You Do", "La-La-La-La-Labia" (reprises)

=== Season 3 (2006–07) ===
No. overall	No. in season	Title	Directed by	Written by	Original release date	Prod. code
23	1	"Freaks & Greeks"	Ray Claffey	Dave Jeser & Matt Silverstein	October 5, 2006	301
Captain Hero sets up his own fraternity, with Wooldoor and Xandir as pledges, to compete with the new Greek family next door, whom Captain Hero believes also has a fraternity. Meanwhile, Ling-Ling's father falls in love with Toot. Musical number: "Pledging Days" and "Girls Just Want to Have Fun" Guest star: Maurice LaMarche as George Georgiopolis
24	2	"Wooldoor Sockbat's Giggle-Wiggle Funny Tickle Non-Traditional Progressive Multicultural Roundtable!"	Dwayne Carey-Hill	Erik Sommers	October 12, 2006	302
A Terminator tries to stop Wooldoor's new children's show from turning the world gay after Clara alerts it of this problem, causing Wooldoor to go on the run, with the aid of Xandir, who is from the "gay future", caused by Wooldoor's show, while the Terminator befriends Captain Hero. Toot pursues the mythical Wienermobile, although Foxxy and Ling-Ling, believing it is just a myth, seal her in the closet to prevent her from searching for it. Musical number: "The Happy Stupid Kid Show Theme Song" and "Wieners"
25	3	"Spelling Applebee's"	Frank Marino	Jordan Young	October 19, 2006	303
Foxxy competes in spelling bees, with Spanky as her agent. Captain Hero falls in love with Clara, but fails to impress her, until he discovers Clara has a sexual fetish for car crashes. Musical number: "No Easy Way Out" and "Holding Out for a Hero" Guest star: David Cooley
26	4	"Unrestrainable Trainable"	Kyounghee Lim	Elijah Aron	October 25, 2006	304
Captain Hero's "special" son, mothered by his sister, attacks the city. Clara keeps Wooldoor sick to receive attention for taking care of him, although Foxxy is onto her. Features Bill Cosby saying "without the pudding, I'm just another unemployed sexual predator" Musical number: "Cat's in the Kitchen" (parody) Guest stars: Billy West and David Cooley
27	5	"N.R.A.Y. RAY"	Stephen Sandoval	Craig DiGregorio	November 1, 2006	305
Captain Hero takes up hunting after being "raped", and getting carried away with firearm usage. Meanwhile, Foxxy hides her grandson Ray-Ray in the walls of the Drawn Together house while she's on trial, and he falls for Toot. Musical number: "I Wanted You to Know" Guest star: Phil LaMarr as Delivery Guy
28	6	"Mexican't Buy Me Love" "Captain Hero and the Cool Kids"	Dwayne Carey-Hill	Reed Agnew	November 8, 2006	307
Ling-Ling takes up cockfighting in order to bribe the Mexican police into letting himself and Toot leave the country. Captain Hero is desperate to hang out with the Cool Kids, but cannot until Foxxy, who is one of them, gives him a chance to join them. Musical number: "El Cascabel" Guest star: Carlos Mencia as King of Mexico
29	7	"Lost in Parking Space, Part One"	Peter Avanzino	Elijah Aron and Erik Sommers	November 15, 2006	306
Clara preaches to her housemates about the rapture. When they later get trapped in a parking space, she thinks they have been taken off to Heaven. Meanwhile, the rest of the gang leaves her behind to go to the mall, but end up getting trapped in the van. Guest stars: Will Forte as Kirk Cameron and Phil LaMarr as Delivery Guy
30	8	"Lost in Parking Space, Part Two"	Ray Claffey	Elijah Aron and Erik Sommers	October 4, 2007	308
While trying to save his friends from the van, Xandir becomes a derelict hobo and abandons them. Meanwhile, Foxxy is captured by a goth cashier at Hot Topic and Clara forgets her religion and becomes a rebellious, sinning henchman of a mailman who she has mistaken for Satan. Musical number: "Scumma Bumma Grubba Moochie" Guest stars: Billy West as Denzel Washington, Qarie Marshall and Phil LaMarr as Delivery Guy
31	9	"Charlotte's Web of Lies"	Ray Claffey	Bill Freiberger	October 11, 2007	313
During a men's night, Captain Hero, Xandir, Spanky, Wooldoor and Ling-Ling play the "Drawn Together Drinking Game" and become thoroughly drunk; unfortunately, Ling-Ling kills Xandir, depriving him of his last life (as he is a video game character), an act that Ling-Ling feels regret over. Meanwhile, Captain Hero, Spanky and Wooldoor, still drunken, drive out in the Foxxy 5 van to buy some more alcohol, but run over a "homeless" man, who Captain Hero and Wooldoor decide to bring home, while Spanky, being drunken, runs into the bushes. While in the bushes, Spanky meets Charlotte the spider, who he has an overnight affair with. Meanwhile, during Captain Hero's shift to take care of the "homeless man" that he ran over last night, he discovers that the man is his arch-nemesis, Scroto, who makes him wash his testicles. Meanwhile, Spanky is being stalked by Charlotte, after she has become entranced by him. While this is happening, Ling-Ling reveals his tragic backstory and crushed dreams of becoming a dancer to an anger management club, before going out to pursue his dream, and winds up getting a part in the stage production "Drawn Together: The Musical". Musical number: "Face the Balls" Guest stars: Rebecca Romijn as Charlotte and Jason Huber as Gash
32	10	"Breakfast Food Killer"	Peter Avanzino	Josh Lieb	October 18, 2007	312
Wooldoor becomes a mascot for an evil cereal company. Meanwhile, Toot finds all five UPCs with the help of Foxxy and stops the company from enslaving kids. Musical number: "The Best Time of Your Life" Guest star: Jason Huber as Gash
33	11	"Drawn Together Babies"	Frank Marino	Erik Sommers	October 25, 2007	309
The housemates, as baby versions of themselves, accidentally kill their babysitter and try to cover it up from the babysitter's rich boyfriend Chad, their carers, and the infant Captain Hero. The story also explains how the housemates, originally polar opposites of what they are in the actual series, settled into their present-day personalities. Musical number: "Drawn Together Babies Theme Song" Guest star: Ian Ziering as Chase Huffington Note: This episode was originally written for being the pilot of a Drawn Together Babies spin-off series, until Comedy Central rejected the idea.
34	12	"Nipple Ring-Ring Goes to Foster Care"	Stephen Sandoval	Elijah Aron & Jordan Young	November 1, 2007	310
Ling-Ling is sent to foster care to Foxxy's father, who turns out to be Uncle Ben of Uncle Ben's Rice fame. Captain Hero discovers how to communicate through time with his younger self when his nipple ring is struck by lightning.
35	13	"Foxxy and the Gang Bang" "Toot Goes Bollywood"	Dwayne Carey-Hill	Dave Lewman & Joe Liss	November 8, 2007	311
When Toot challenges Foxxy to cease having sex (and Foxxy challenging Toot to do the opposite), Toot discovers that no one wants to have sex with her until she is hit by a car containing an Indian family, who, believing her to be a sacred talking cow, take her to their home, where she is eventually given the title of "King of India". Meanwhile, Foxxy seeks psychiatric help from Wooldoor, who implants a false memory in her head about being sexually suppressed by Phat Allen and His Junkyard Pals. Musical number: "Implanted Memories" Guest star: Otis Day
36	14	"The Elimination Special, Part II: The Elimination" "American Idol Parody Clip Show"	Frank Marino	Stacey Deddo	November 14, 2007	314
The housemates compete in an American Idol-type talent contest. At the end of the episode, the housemates read a letter telling them they have been cancelled and walk into a room marked "Unemployment". Musical number: "One House", "Daisy Bell", "Black Chick's Tongue", "A Moment Like This", "Ling-Ling Battle Song!", "Fire the Load", "I Wanted You to Know" and "La-La-La-La-Labia" (reprises) Guest stars: Billy West and Jason Huber as Gash

== Film ==
- The Drawn Together Movie: The Movie!
