= Jordan Young (producer) =

American television producer and writer

- Occupations: Producer, writer
- Years active: 2000–present
- Television: BoJack Horseman; Drawn Together; Raising Hope; Life in Pieces

Jordan Young is an American film and television producer and writer best known for BoJack Horseman, Drawn Together, Raising Hope, and Life in Pieces.

== Early life and education ==
Young was born and raised in Syosset, New York; he attended Syosset High School. He went to School of Visual Arts in New York City, and left after receiving a job offer in animation on The Simpsons.

== Career ==
Young began his career in animation as a character layout artist on the animated sitcom The Simpsons from 2000 until 2004, in addition to the animated series The Oblongs in 2001. He began his writing career on the adult animated sitcom Drawn Together in 2004 after developing the series for Comedy Central along with Dave Jeser and Matt Silverstein. Young was responsible for the original character designs and for helping the development team bring a visual element to the pitch to help executives understand the show's concept. He later served as a consultant on the 2010 film The Drawn Together Movie: The Movie! which followed the series finale. In 2008, he wrote an episode for the popular sitcom It's Always Sunny in Philadelphia. The following year he produced an episode of the MTV animated series DJ & the Fro and wrote multiple episodes of the satirical sitcom series Better Off Ted.

He wrote and produced the popular sitcom Raising Hope from 2010 to 2014, followed by multiple episodes for the animated series Golan the Insatiable in 2015 and Son of Zorn in 2016 and 2017.

In 2015, Young co-wrote and co-executive produced the hit adult animated black comedy-drama series BoJack Horseman in collaboration with Elijah Aron. The series follows BoJack Horseman, who is described as "the most beloved sitcom horse of the '90s, 20 years later. He's a curmudgeon with a heart of... not quite gold... but something like gold. Copper?" It stars Will Arnett, Aaron Paul, and Amy Sedaris. Young is cited as saying of BoJack Horseman, "If he could talk, he would have pawned that burden off as quickly as possible." The show's writing has received rave reviews from multiple media outlets, including The Ringer who said: "The really striking thing is the way writers Jordan Young and Elijah Aron fold a one-off adventure into the broader themes of the show."

In 2017, Young and Aron were nominated for a Writers Guild of America Award for Television: Animation for the BoJack Horseman episode "Fish Out of Water". The episode received rave reviews from multiple critics, including The A.V. Club, which called it "a tour de force episode", "nothing short of a masterpiece", and "a bold, tremendous, and beautiful achievement in both animation and storytelling". Paste Magazine said, "...in its playful, ingenious, sensitive portrait of a stranger in a strange land, 'Fish Out of Water' is likely to leave you as it left me: speechless," The show's creator, Raphael Bob-Waksberg, also praised Young and Aron saying: "They took this thing that none of us knew how to write, and did a really good job writing a full script without the dialogue, describing everything meticulously: 'BoJack walks from the doorway to his bed. He sits down. Looks at his cigarette. How's he gonna light that?" The episode also won an Award in Annecy for Special Distinction for a TV Series in the same year.

In June 2017, Young was a speaker on the Film2Future Panel, a nonprofit organization serving high schoolers in Los Angeles.

He has been a co-executive producer on the CBS sitcom Life in Pieces since 2017; he is also a writer for the show.

== Filmography ==
=== Film ===
Year	Title	Role	Notes
2010	The Drawn Together Movie: The Movie!	Consultant	Direct-to-Video

=== Television ===
Year	Title	Role	Notes
2000–04	The Simpsons	Character Layout Artist	20 episodes
2001	The Oblongs	Character Layout Artist	2 episodes
2004–07	Drawn Together	Writer (developed by), Supervising Producer, Writer	36 episodes
2008	It's Always Sunny in Philadelphia	Writer	Episode: "Mac and Dennis: Manhunters"
2009	DJ & the Fro	Consulting Producer	Episode: "101"
2009–10	Better Off Ted	Story Editor, Writer	13 episodes
2010–14	Raising Hope	Producer, Co-Producer, Executive Story Editor, Co-Executive Producer, Writer	87 episodes
2015	Golan the Insatiable	Co-Executive Producer, Writer	6 episodes
2016–17	Son of Zorn	Writer, Co-Executive Producer	4 episodes
2015–17	BoJack Horseman	Consulting Producer, Co-Executive Producer, Writer	36 episodes
2017–18	Life in Pieces	Co-Executive Producer, Writer, Consulting Producer	15 episodes
2022	Close Enough	Co-Executive Producer, Writer	Episode: "Robots with Benefits"

== Awards and nominations ==
Year	Nominee / work	Award	Result
2017	BoJack Horseman (Episode: "Fish Out of Water")	Writers Guild of America Award for Television: Animation	
