= Foxxy =

Foxxy may mean:

- Foxxy Cleopatra, fictional character from the film Austin Powers in Goldmember
- Foxxy Love, fictional character from the TV series Drawn Together
