= List of Drawn Together characters =

Character list for an animated sitcom

The Drawn Together cast (Counter-clockwise from upper left): Wooldoor, Toot, Ling-Ling, Foxxy, Xandir, Clara, Spanky and Captain Hero.

This is a list of characters appearing in the animated television series Drawn Together.

== Main characters ==
=== Princess Clara ===
Princess Clara (voiced by Tara Strong) is a parody of Disney princesses. Most of her humor revolves around her bigotry, gullibility, stupidity and religious fanaticism. Among reality show archetypes, she represents the "sheltered rich girl." According to creators Dave Jeser and Matt Silverstein, they partially based Clara on The Real World: New Orleans' Julie Stoffer, a Mormon who had little experience dealing with gay people or people of other cultures and who tended to make offensive remarks without realizing it.

Originally, while Clara was portrayed as being bigoted, she never seemed to be genuinely and completely hateful. For example, she seemed to get along with both Foxxy and Xandir despite being bigoted and homophobic and acted surprised and confused when they were offended by her behavior, as well as having a brother-sister relationship with Wooldoor. She often clashes with (and loses to) Foxxy due to her bigotry, though she sees her as one of her best friends. Usually, Foxxy returns the same feeling, until she makes more bigoted remarks towards her. However, later episodes show her as harsh, strident, fundamentalist and intolerant. Concerned solely with crusading against sinfulness, her desire to quench sin is so strong that she shows no concern for the happiness or well-being of others.

Throughout the first half of Season Three, Clara begins a dark, downward spiral, reaching her lowest point in "Lost in Parking Space"; believing that the Rapture had come and left her behind, Clara sells her soul to a delivery driver whom she believes to be Satan and dedicates herself to hurting others, ultimately becoming a torturer. However, when she discovers that her first victim is Foxxy, she realizes her mistake and rededicates her life to God, becoming a much kinder and sympathetic individual.

In original artwork before the show's release, Clara was originally drawn as a blonde, with a different dress and a lighter skin tone.

=== Wooldoor Jebediah Sockbat ===
Wooldoor Jebediah Sockbat (voiced by James Arnold Taylor) is a bizarre children's show character that is combination of Nickelodeon characters, SpongeBob SquarePants and Stimpy, with many of the typical reality-defying behaviors as seen in the Looney Tunes franchise and Tex Avery-directed cartoons of MGM. He is also good friends with Xandir, Spanky and sometimes Captain Hero. Most of his humor revolves around his childlike innocence, his happy-go-lucky nature or his general strangeness; he is often used to assume a variety of professions to fit the needs of the scene. Among reality show archetypes, he represents the "attention-starved weirdo". Wooldoor is the least mature out of all the main characters, reaching puberty in "Clum Babies"; though Ling-Ling is far younger in actual calendar years, despite being a fully grown individual of his species.

Originally, Wooldoor's role was to have been that of a bipolar drug addict. However, creators Jeser and Silverstein decided to change this when Comedy Central producers protested, noting that the cast's personalities were getting too dark, and they needed a character who was innocent and childlike to contrast with the darker tendencies of the others; though Wooldoor does indeed have a dark side, he rarely shows it. Wooldoor is originally described as a "Whacky Whatchamacallit", but the species are named "sockbats". The rest of his species was exterminated in a holocaust by a species of Strawberry Shortcake-like characters known as the sweetcakes.

=== Foxxy Love ===
Foxxy Love (voiced by Cree Summer) is a sharp-tongued African-American parody of Valerie Brown from Josie and the Pussycats. Her name is a combination of the names of blaxploitation characters Foxy Brown and Christie Love. She is a promiscuous mystery-solving musician. Most of her humor revolves around her sexual habits and her unsophisticated or uneducated manner of speech; she is often used to poke fun at black stereotypes, but is the wisest and most far-sighted of all the housemates, serving as the voice of reason in many episodes. She has at least two children, Qualmella and Timmy (the circumstances of Timmy's missing status change from episode to episode), as well as a teenage grandson named Ray-Ray. All were mentioned in a few episodes and were then taken away from her. She was also a member of an all-female band, The Foxxy 5, which consisted of various other female versions of black cartoon characters and is a reference to The Jackson 5. Among reality show archetypes, she represents the sassy black woman, often acting as the voice of reason among the cast members. Foxxy also has father issues; he left for cigarettes when she was three years old. Her tail and ears are the result of her father having sex with a fox.

In original artwork before the show's release, Foxxy Love wore a different outfit.

=== Toot Braunstein ===
Toot Braunstein (voiced by Tara Strong) is an overweight sex symbol from the 1920s based on rubber hose-animated cartoon characters from the golden age of American animation, particularly Fleischer Studios' Betty Boop, who demands to be the center of attention, cuts herself with razor blades when depressed and often instigates conflict in the house. Most of her humor revolves around her unattractiveness (especially her weight), her gluttony, her poor personal hygiene or her frequent bouts of psychosis and alcoholism. Among reality show archetypes, she is the manipulative, although later evolves into the dumpy fat/unpopular girl archetype. According to creators Jeser and Silverstein, Toot is partially based on Big Brother 3's Amy Crews. Toot's passion for cheese, as well as her tendency to cry and put on weight (from "Requiem for a Reality Show"), come directly from Crews. In an interview on Comedy Central's website, Strong states that Toot was her favorite role in the history of her career.

In original artwork before the series' release, Toot had longer hair, a thin waist with broad hips and wore a strapless dress. In the third season, Toot becomes a much more sympathetic character and her role as the series' mean-spirited character is largely taken over by Clara.

=== Ling-Ling ===
Ling-Ling (voiced by Abbey DiGregorio) is a psychopathic and homicidal spoof of Pikachu from the Pokémon franchise. He is an orange-furred battle monster with an exclamation mark for a tail who battles using various supernatural abilities and speaks in pseudo-Japanese gibberish. Most of his humor revolves around his sociopathic desires or his difficulty assimilating into American culture; he is often used to poke fun at Asian stereotypes. Among reality show archetypes, he represents the culture-shocked foreigner. In "Super Nanny", it is shown that because Ling-Ling has slanted eyes he sees things as a manga instead of the way everyone else does. It was revealed that he had a bad relationship with his trainer, Gash (a parody of Ash Ketchum), who would not allow him a chance to live his dream of becoming a dancer; in retaliation, Ling-Ling shot an electric ball at Gash and proceeded to disembowel him.

In original artwork before the series' release, Ling-Ling was green and much smaller, similar to Jerry the mouse from Tom and Jerry.

=== Xandir P. Whifflebottom ===
Xandir P. Whifflebottom (voiced by Jack Plotnick) is a homosexual and effeminate spoof of young, blonde and handsome swordsman protagonists in video games, particularly Link from The Legend of Zelda series and Cloud Strife from the Final Fantasy series. Xandir is extremely sensitive and easily scared or worried; among reality show archetypes, he represents the token gay participant. At the start of the first season, he often claims to be on "a never-ending quest to save his girlfriend", but in the episode "Gay Bash", along with help from the other housemates, Xandir comes out of the closet and this is often poked fun at by the other males in the house, and criticized by the homophobic Princess Clara. Xandir's girlfriend dumps him, but he finds new love with a genie, who is promptly kidnapped by Xandir's nemesis Lord Slashstab.

Along with Foxxy, Xandir is often the most sane or reasonable member of the house. He is frequently dismayed and surprised at the bizarre and illogical tangents the other housemates often take (especially Captain Hero, whom he shares an odd relationship based upon Captain Hero's particular mood). When asked for advice, his tends to be most grounded in the real-world and he offers useful input. Being a video game character means that Xandir has "multiple lives" so even though he is sometimes killed on the series, he reappears without any damage with a counter flashing above his head indicating the number of lives he has left.

In original artwork before the series' release, Xandir's hair was dark brown and longer and his skin tone was much darker. He was originally supposed to be a satyr.

=== Spanky Ham ===
Spanky Ham (voiced by Adam Carolla) is an anthropomorphic pig who serves as a parody of crass Internet flash animation cartoons. Among reality show archetypes, most of his humor revolves around his crudeness and he represents the boorish party animal. The creators also modeled Spanky's personality on David "Puck" Rainey from The Real World: San Francisco. During the first few episodes of the series, Spanky serves as an antagonist. Toward the end of the first season, Spanky bonds with Clara and is depicted as more sympathetic afterward.

=== Captain Leslie Hero ===
Captain Leslie Hero (voiced by Jess Harnell) is a dimwitted, lecherous, heteroflexible parody of Superman (and other superheroes), with a visual style taken from the works of Bruce Timm and Max Fleischer. Most of his humor revolves around his perverse sexual tastes, his tendency toward violence, his immaturity or his stupidity; there is also a running joke in which he is heavily suggested to be pansexual and interested in necrophilia. Among reality TV archetypes, he represents the macho egotist.

Of all the housemates, Captain Hero saw the most character development over the series. In the first season, Hero was a simple character with a fairly minor role on the show; he was introduced in the first episode as simply "another person in the house", and as Harnell puts it, his personality was that of an "overgrown frat guy" whose libido was his main source of humor. Over time, however, he grew considerably more complex; consequently, his role was expanded to the point where he became the most frequently used on the show. "The Other Cousin" was the first episode to focus on Hero, but it was the second-season episode "Little Orphan Hero" that proved to be a major turning point for the character. In the episode, Hero, after suffering a nervous breakdown, meets his parents for the first time and sees many long-dormant emotional issues rise to the surface. Subsequent episodes would expand on these developments. By the time of "A Very Special Drawn Together Afterschool Special", it seemed perfectly natural for Hero to be cast in the role of the sensitive and caring (if overly emotional) nurturer. Hero has an "arch nemesis" called Scroto who is a parody of Lex Luthor, whose "villainous" activity always involves tricking Hero into washing his testicles.

In original artwork before the series' release, Hero wore tights, his suit was slightly darker in color and had a different symbol on it.

== Recurring characters ==
=== Octopussoir ===
Octopussoir (voiced by Jess Harnell) is a tentacled monster created after Clara's evil stepmother put a curse on her when she was young, causing Octopussoir to appear in place of her vagina. Despite its frightening appearance, the Octopussoir is actually quite kind, only attacking people when it is frightened by loud noises or provoked in some fashion. When the housemates first learn of Octopussoir in "Clara's Dirty Little Secret", they intend to kill it, but come to accept it after realizing how kind it was. Still, Clara never got over the stigma she felt not having a normal vagina, so she gets rid of it through plastic surgery in "Alzheimer's That Ends Well". Clara eventually reconsiders; however, when she tries to get the procedure reversed, Octopussoir tells her that it had moved on, having completed college and married Unusually Flexible Girl.

=== Bleh ===
Bleh (voiced by Sarah Silverman) is Clara's intellectually disabled cousin. However, she is impossibly attractive, to the point which Spanky calls her "retarded hot". Her speech consists almost solely of blurbs taken from critical reviews of the film I Am Sam. She makes a harsh braying sound when excited or distressed and is also prone to drooling. Bleh possesses the ability to count cards, as evidenced in "Ghostesses in the Slot Machine"; this ability was inspired by Dustin Hoffman's character in Rain Man. Bleh's name is a reference to The Facts of Life, a reference to how Blair Warner's handicapped cousin pronounced Blair's name. She can also catch thrown objects without looking, a reference to the films Awakenings and The Boy Who Could Fly.

=== Jun-Jee ===
Jun-Jee (voiced by Jess Harnell) is Ling-Ling's father who speaks in a stereotypical Japanese accent. Just as Ling-Ling is based on Pikachu, Jun-Jee seems to be based on Raichu, the evolved form of Pikachu. The creators revealed in the DVD commentary to "The Other Cousin" that Jun-Jee is named after Jun Song and Jee Choe from Big Brother IV. "Freaks & Greeks" also reveals that Jun-Jee is extremely wealthy and that his vision is significantly impaired because of cataracts, which hampers his ability to enjoy one of his favorite hobbies, karaoke.

In his debut in "The Other Cousin", Jun-Jee speaks in Ling-Ling's language, but in subsequent appearances he speaks English. He used to be a great battle monster like Ling-Ling, but eventually retired and started a dry cleaning business. In the past, Jun-Jee often missed out on important moments in his son's life. He also disapproves of Ling-Ling's lifestyle, feeling that Ling-Ling battles too much and needs to settle down and find one monster to battle with. Despite all this, he and his son share a clear bond with each other.

=== The King ===
The King (voiced by Jonathan Kimmel) is Clara's father, and the source of all her bigoted beliefs. While Clara is a generic composite of nearly every Disney princess, the King seems to be based more specifically on Ariel's father, King Triton, from The Little Mermaid. He originally disliked Spanky Ham, but became friends with him after Spanky taught Clara how to laugh and have fun. He drives a carriage, sometimes while drunk (which, according to Clara's evil stepmother, is the reason Clara's mother is no longer around). His favorite activity is watching strippers, whose activities he always refers to as "the ballet"; in fact, his preoccupation with strippers made his relationship with Clara an emotionally distant one, since he always spent more time with strippers than he did with his daughter. In "Ghostesses in the Slot Machine", Clara takes up the profession to try to win his affection; though her efforts are initially unsuccessful, the King eventually tells Clara (and Foxxy) that he loves her after watching his daughter simulate lesbian sex with Foxxy on stage. He appears to have an incestuous interest in his daughter; in addition to being eager to see her strip (mentioned above), in "Dirty Pranking No. 2", he gives her a kiss that seems passionate rather than familial.

=== The Jew Producer ===
The Jew Producer (voiced by James Arnold Taylor) is in charge of the reality show and owns the house. He appears as a man in a suit with a speaker for a head. He calls the housemates via intercom to inform them of reality show challenges and can be contacted when they need him. He openly admits that he sometimes edits the show in order to produce something more exciting, a practice to which both Foxxy and Toot strongly object.

In "The One Wherein There Is a Big Twist", after the housemates demand a material prize of some sort, he disguises himself as Bucky Bucks (a parody of Richie Rich and Donald Trump) to give them that challenge. After the contest is over, he reveals that it was all a hoax and then rips off his mask to reveal his true identity. In "The One Wherein There Is a Big Twist, Part II", he forces the housemates bow down to his penis in a humiliating game of Simon Says to allow them to return to the newly rebuilt house after they destroyed it. He hosted "The Drawn Together Clip Show", promising that at the end, one of the housemates would be crowned winner of Drawn Together. At the end, however, he announced that the viewer was the winner.

In the series finale, "American Idol Parody Clip Show", vocals from backstage indicate he kills two stagehands, then himself. In the same episode, he mentions that he was burned in a horrible accident, which explains why he has a speaker for his head. In The Drawn Together Movie: The Movie!, it is revealed that his wife and son both have speakers for heads.

He is the in-show representation of creators Dave Jeser and Matt Silverstein, both of whom are also Jewish.

=== The Sockbats ===
The Sockbats are Wooldoor's people, who were largely wiped out in a holocaust by the Sweetcakes, who took to eating the Sockbats in the midst of a famine and ever since have been obsessed with cooking and eating Sockbats. Since that time, the ones who survived have become proficient in making pornography, creating the popular Sockbats Gone Wild video series. It is unknown how many Sockbats are still around, but all of Wooldoor's immediate family seem to be deceased. Often, as a joke, Sockbats will be inserted into the backgrounds of certain scenes (usually those taking place away from the house) as extras.

=== Strawberry Sweetcake ===
Strawberry Sweetcake (voiced by Cree Summer) is a diminutive redheaded young woman and a parody of Strawberry Shortcake. When Wooldoor hangs himself, the Jew Producer demands that the housemates find a replacement for him in order for them to be able to return to the house. After exhaustive interviews, they choose Strawberry Sweetcake. After Wooldoor returned to the house alive and well, he reveals that her people, the Sweetcakes, used to live peacefully with Wooldoor's people, the Sockbats. After a while, a great famine swept the lands. The Sweetcakes tagged the innocent Sockbats and fooled them into manual labor. Eventually, they turned the Sockbats into chocolate (a reference to the Holocaust, and a parody of the film Soylent Green). Sweetcake assures the housemates that it is all in the past, and they believe her, with the exception of Foxxy Love. Foxxy attempts to find out the truth about Sweetcake, but ends up being captured. Sweetcake attempts to cook Wooldoor, but Foxxy manages to get free and expose her plan. After threatening the housemates with violence if they get in her way, Sweetcake is finally eaten by Toot.

=== Edward Goldberg ===
Mr. Goldberg (voiced by Jess Harnell) is a figure whom the show trots out any time a Jewish stereotype is needed (an example of the Jewish tradition of often scathingly self-deprecating humor – see Jewish humor). He has appeared in three episodes to date: he is the Orthodox Jew who "poisons" the well in "Foxxy vs. the Board of Education", the homeless person Wooldoor uses as a cadaver in "Terms of Endearment", and "the most confused villain in the world", Señor Eskimo Goldberg in "Captain Girl".

=== Unusually Flexible Girl ===
Unusually Flexible Girl (voiced by Tara Strong) is a superheroine with the ability to stretch like elastic, a spoof of Elastigirl from Disney and Pixar's The Incredibles. She was Captain Hero's "girlfriend" in superhero school. Hero later on meets her again, and after a quick sex session, he learns she is interested in marriage. Uncomfortable with this, Hero convinces Wooldoor to marry her for him. But he later gets jealous of Wooldoor and wins her back, only to regret it. Wooldoor starts to feel the same. Around the end of the episode, she is shot in the head by Clara and Toot with a potato cannon. She is pronounced dead, but is revealed to be alive in "Alzheimer's That Ends Well". She is later seen marrying Octopussoir.

=== Steve from Long Island ===
Steve (voiced by James Arnold Taylor) is a regular club-goer who has a past friendship with Ling-Ling. In his second appearance, however, he does not interact with Ling-Ling at any point, and their friendship is not mentioned. It is also "revealed" that Steve has a third arm, but this is obviously just a gag.

=== Judge Fudge ===
Judge Fudge (voiced by James Arnold Taylor) is a square of fudge who fights crime and serves as a judge. He has his own TV series, The Judge Fudge Adventure Power Hour, a parody of '70s blaxploitation films and courtroom TV shows. He also has his own theme song, "The Judge Fudge Theme", a funk/soul song which plays whenever he makes an appearance. He is revealed in "The Lemon-AIDS Walk" to be a steroid user and, in "The Drawn Together Clip Show", the Jew Producer reveals that he was last year's Drawn Together winner.

=== Child Services ===
Child Services (voiced by Paget Brewster in "Captain Girl", Tara Strong in "Nipple Ring-Ring Goes to Foster Care") is a woman who works for the Child Services company. She is a serious woman who always has a dull and stern look on her face. She will visit the Drawn Together House whenever she hears word that there is a baby or young child being abused or living in improper conditions, so that she can take them to foster families. She is, however, very illogical, as she will take children from their unfit homes and relocate them in even more unfit foster homes.

=== Gash ===
Gash (voiced by Jason Huber) is a black-haired adolescent boy who is the former trainer/best friend of Ling-Ling. A spoof of Pokémon's Ash Ketchum (the trainer of Pikachu, whom Ling-Ling is based on), Gash captures and trains battle monsters to fight using a red and white pyramid, a reference to Poké Balls. Several years ago, Gash ruined Ling-Ling's dreams of becoming a dancer by capturing him and taking his dancing shoes away, forcing him into a life of fighting.

A clip of Ling-Ling attacking Gash and disemboweling him is shown in previous episodes.

=== Excludie ===
Excludie (voiced by James Arnold Taylor) is a diminutive furry yellow humanoid who is very excitable and outgoing, but, as his name suggests, is always being ostracized from the other housemates' activities.

=== Ni-Pul ===
Ni-Pul (voiced by Cree Summer) is a purple cat-like battle monster with whom Ling-Ling's father paired Ling-Ling in an arranged relationship. Her name is a pun on the word "nipple". Ling-Ling genuinely falls in love with Ni-Pul, but she gradually becomes less interested in him. When Ling-Ling confronts her about how the passion had gone from their relationship, Ni-Pul suggested that they reinvigorate the relationship by dropping the battle metaphor and simply having sex. Ling-Ling agrees to it, and they happily spent the rest of the episode fooling around until Bob the Cucumber kills them both during his shooting spree. Though Ni-Pul is resurrected by Wooldoor's Clum Babies, her relationship with Ling-Ling is never mentioned again.

=== Bob the Cucumber ===
Bob the Cucumber (voiced by James Arnold Taylor) is an anthropomorphic cucumber, a Catholic extremist, and the main antagonist in "Clum Babies". He goes on a murderous rampage, killing everyone except Wooldoor which made him shot himself. He is a parody of Larry the Cucumber from VeggieTales.

=== Larry the Tomato ===
Larry the Tomato (voiced by James Arnold Taylor) is an anthropomorphic tomato and a Catholic extremist. He got brutally murdered at the ending by Bob, along with Princess Clara, Foxxy, Spanky Ham, Ling-Ling, Ni-Pul, Captain Hero, Xandir, and more other people. He is a parody of Bob the Tomato from VeggieTales.

=== Charlotte ===
Charlotte (voiced by Tara Strong) is a teenage girl assigned to babysit the Drawn Together babies, but is nothing but cruel to them. After the babies' parents leave, she cusses them out and leaves to meet her boyfriend Chad Huffington. However, the babies plot revenge and inadvertently break her neck over a rocking horse. She is later revealed to be alive, but is killed by Toot.

=== Franken Berry ===
Franken Berry (voiced by Jason Huber) is the mascot for the cereal Franken Berry and the main antagonist of the episode "Breakfast Food Killer". His mission was to collect all of the UPC codes in order to take down the cereal empire and make it his own. He accomplishes this by gaining the trust of Wooldoor and harnessing his power for evil.

=== The Board of Education ===
The Board of Education (voiced by Chris Edgerly) is an anthropomorphic wooden board who is a parody of Bill from Schoolhouse Rock!.

== Movie characters ==
=== The Network Head ===
The Network Head (voiced by Vernon Wells) is the primary antagonist in the film. As his name suggests, he is the head of the television network airing the show. He lost his wife and his daughter, Sasha, who was killed in the car crash after her daughter saw a billboard depicting Foxxy and Clara making simulated love, and fell into a vat of acid. This made the Network Head try to cancel the show to exact his revenge for his family. He designed a robot named I.S.R.A.E.L. (Intelligent Smart Robot Animation Eraser Lady) to have the housemates erased from existence. The Network Head is defeated and killed after being impaled on a spike, but despite this, his plan to cancel the show succeeds as the cast ends up being erased afterwards.

=== I.S.R.A.E.L. ===
I.S.R.A.E.L. (voiced by Seth MacFarlane) is a feminine robot who is the secondary antagonist of the film. Her name is an acronym for Intelligent Smart Robot Animation Eraser Lady I.S.R.A.E.L. is sent by the Network Head to erase the housemates with the assistance of the Jew Producer. In the end, the Jew Producer convinces I.S.R.A.E.L. to spare the housemates and she kills the Network Head when he gets mad with her. She dies at the end of the movie when she is erased along with the rest of the cast.

=== The Suck My Taint Girl ===
The Suck My Taint Girl (voiced by Cree Summer) is a girl, presumably around 5, 6, 7 or 8 years old, who has her own show The Suck My Taint Show that replaced the reality show in which the protagonists starred. She is drawn in a style similar to that of South Park, which had taken over Drawn Together's timeslot when the show was cancelled in real life, and her personality is reminiscent of Darla Dimple from Cats Don't Dance.

When Foxxy, Spanky, and Wooldoor arrive to ask for help, the Suck My Taint Girl reveals herself to be a fan of the fictional, in-universe Drawn Together TV series, and informs them that the way to get back on the air is the get a point in Make-A-Point Land. She informs Foxxy that if she can assemble the rest of the group, she will lead them to Make-A-Point-Land. Foxxy agrees and manages to round up everyone except Clara, who has been killed. The Suck My Taint Girl is saddened by Clara's death, but agrees to take the group to meet the Make-A-Point wizard.

It is later revealed that the Suck My Taint Girl was the one who tricked them, and in fact, hates Drawn Together, as well as being in a relationship with the Network Head. She declares that she has no intention of letting the housemates get their timeslot back. She is eventually erased when they drop the detonator for the eraser bomb under the Network Head's coat is dropped and set off, erasing the entirety of Make-A-Point-Land, along with the Jew Producer and the Wizard. The housemates make it out just in time.

=== Molly ===
Molly is a dead, young woman who appears as Captain Hero's "love interest" in The Drawn Together Movie: The Movie!. It is unknown if Molly is in fact the woman's real name, or if Captain Hero made it up for her. Hero believes that Molly is in fact alive and returns his affections, but the rest of the cast (especially Xandir) know she is dead and just another victim of Hero's strange sexual behaviors.
