= Apollo Gauntlet =

American adult animated television series

- Created by: Myles Langlois
- Based on: Apollo Gaunlet by Myles Langlois
- Written by: Myles Langlois
- Directed by: Greg Franklin
- Voices of: Myles Langlois; Tom Kenny
- Theme music composer: Myles Langlois
- Opening theme: "Apollo Gauntlet Theme"
- Composer: Myles Langlois
- Country of origin: United States
- Original language: English
- No. of seasons: 1
- No. of episodes: 6 (+ Pilot)

Production
- Executive producers: Myles Langlois; Brendan Burch; Wendy Willis; Sam Hansen; Jimmy Miller
- Producers: Andy Fiedler; Duncan Ferguson (Pilot)
- Editors: Tony Christopherson; Ryan Samsam (Series only, Episode 1–3)
- Running time: 11 minutes
- Production companies: 6 Point Harness; Mosaic; Williams Street

Original release
- Network: Adult Swim
- Release: December 4, 2016 – August 13, 2017

Apollo Gauntlet is an American adult animated television series created and written by Canadian animator Myles Langlois, which is an adaptation of his independent web series of the same name, released in 2012 on Rug Burn, a YouTube network born from a partnership between Titmouse, Inc. and 6 Point Harness. It follows the eponymous superhero as he fights evil in a futuristic medieval society.

Produced for Adult Swim by the companies 6 Point Harness (its first television series as a production label for Mondo Media), Mosaic and Williams Street, its pilot episode was aired on December 4, 2016, while the series aired from July 9 to August 13, 2017. The series was not picked up for a second season.

== Plot ==
Apollo Gauntlet is the pseudonym of Paul Cassidy, a police officer from Winnipeg, Manitoba who gets sent to a futuristic medieval society by Dr. Benign. His namesake derives from the pair of sentient talking gauntlets he wears along with his magical suit. In this society, Apollo Gauntlet fights evil while trying to capture Dr. Benign and undo the Oracles of Doom all while figuring out how to get back home.

He also must contend with the evil machinations of Corporal Vile who wants to steal his magic gauntlets due to a prophecy that foretells that the warrior who wears them into battle will achieve omnipotence.

== Characters ==
- Apollo Gauntlet/Paul Cassidy (voice by Myles Langlois)
- King Bellenus (voice by Tom Kenny)
- Daphne (voice by Kelsy Abbott)
- Superknife (voice by Ryan Kwanten)
- Monty (voice by Mark Proksch)
- Rubis (voice by Betsy Sodaro)
- Orenthal Bellenus (voice by James Urbaniak)
- Corporal Vile (voice by Tom Kenny)

== Episodes ==
=== Pilot (2016) ===
No.	Title	Storyboarded by	Original release date	U.S. viewers (millions)
0	"Apollo Gauntlet"	Myles Langlois, Greg Franklin, Brock Gallagher, and Saharat Tantivaranyoo	December 4, 2016	0.727

=== Season 1 (2017) ===
No.	Title	Storyboarded by	Original release date	Prod. code	U.S. viewers (millions)
1	"Origin"	Frank Macchia	July 9, 2017	0.709	
2	"Eros"	Jennifer Shang	July 16, 2017	0.551	
3	"Lunacy"	Frank Macchia, Zach Ramirez, Sakari Singh, and Chris Toms	July 23, 2017	0.513	
4	"Dinner Party"	Zach Ramirez, Sakari Singh, and Chris Toms	July 30, 2017	0.825	
5	"Demon"	Kai Akira, Zach Ramirez, Sakari Singh, and Chris Toms	August 6, 2017	0.676	
6	"Bellenus Blade"	Zach Ramirez, Sakari Singh, and Chris Toms	August 13, 2017	0.868	

== Release and reception ==
Apollo Gauntlet began airing on Adult Swim in July 2017. The pilot aired on December 4, 2016, and was previously released on Adult Swim's official website in August 2016, along with the pilots for several prospective television series, including Brian Wysol's Hot Streets. Viewers could rate each pilot by clicking one of five buttons corresponding to their reactions.

Daniel Kurland of the Den of Geek called the plainness of its animation style unique, identifying influences from the He-Man animated series and other animated fares from the 1960s and '70s. Kurland wrote that its setting would allow many stories to be told and that the "rogues' gallery of creatures" prevalent in the pilot were indicative of many more "exciting" creatures. The A.V. Club's William Hughes called both Apollo and Hot Streets "very Adult Swim–esque", writing that they felt in tandem with Adult Swim's "core aesthetic of cheap-looking, surrealist animation mixed with self-aware dialogue, delivered with a distinctive slacker vibe".
