= Bob the Cucumber =

Bob the Cucumber may refer to:

- Bob the Cucumber, a recurring character from Drawn Together
- The older brother of the VeggieTales character, Larry the Cucumber
