= Drawn Together =

American animated television sitcom (2004–2007)

- Genre: Animated sitcom; Reality; Adult animation; Parody; Crossover; Black comedy; Musical comedy; Surreal humor; Shock humor; Toilet humor; Satire
- Created by: Dave Jeser; Matt Silverstein
- Developed by: Dave Jeser; Matt Silverstein; Jordan Young
- Voices of: Adam Carolla; Jess Harnell; Abbey McBride; Jack Plotnick; Tara Strong; Cree Summer; James Arnold Taylor
- Composer: Eban Schletter
- Country of origin: United States
- Original language: English
- No. of seasons: 3
- No. of episodes: 36 (list of episodes)

Production
- Executive producers: Dave Jeser; Matt Silverstein; Bill Freiberger
- Producers: J. Michael Mendel; Claudia Katz
- Running time: 22–23 minutes (excluding commercials)
- Production companies: Double Hemm; Comedy Partners; Rough Draft Studios

Original release
- Network: Comedy Central
- Release: October 27, 2004 – November 14, 2007

Drawn Together is an American adult animated sitcom created by Dave Jeser and Matt Silverstein. It aired on Comedy Central from October 27, 2004, to November 14, 2007, spanning three seasons. The series is a parody of house-based reality shows and follows the misadventures of the housemates in the fictional series of the same name. The series uses a sitcom format with a reality TV show setting.

Drawn Together uses caricatures of established cartoon characters and stock characters. These character traits parody personalities that are typically seen in reality television shows. Comedy Central advertised it as the first "animated reality TV series" and in some episodes the characters participate in challenges that are similar to reality television challenges. This premise is largely dropped in later episodes.

The series was cancelled after three seasons. A direct-to-video film which serves as its series finale, The Drawn Together Movie: The Movie!, was released on April 20, 2010.

== Characters ==
The cast; counter-clockwise from upper left: Wooldoor Sockbat, Toot Braunstein, Ling-Ling, Foxxy Love, Xandir, Princess Clara, Spanky Ham and Captain Hero

- Captain Leslie Hero (voiced by Jess Harnell): A sociopathic, chauvinistic, idiotic, immature, perverted, heteroflexible, necrophiliac and lecherous parody of superheroes. Being primarily macho, he is prone to occasional random fits of hysteria, akin to post-traumatic stress disorder, playing on the "tragic origin" stories of many superheroes. His character is based on the "flying brick" superhero archetype, especially DC Comics' Superman and Shazam, though he refers in one episode to his "hero cave", an allusion to Batman's Batcave.
- Wooldoor Jebediah Sockbat (voiced by James Arnold Taylor): A hyperactive, bizarre, gullible and simple-minded yellow creature reminiscent of characters like SpongeBob SquarePants, and Stimpy. In addition, he displays many of the typical reality-defying behaviors seen in characters from the Looney Tunes franchise and Tex Avery-directed cartoons of MGM.
- Princess Clara (voiced by Tara Strong): A pampered and bigoted princess. A Christian, she is passionate about singing, but repeatedly demonstrates homophobic and racist behavior. Aside from being partially based on The Real World: New Orleans' Julie Stoffer, she is a spoof of Disney Princesses, mostly Ariel from The Little Mermaid franchise.
- Foxxy Love (voiced by Cree Summer): A sharp-tongued and promiscuous mystery-solving musician who is a parody of Valerie Brown from the Josie and the Pussycats franchise.
- Toot Braunstein (voiced by Tara Strong): An obese, egotistical, depressed and alcoholic sex symbol who is a parody of rubber hose-animated cartoon characters from the golden age of American animation, particularly Fleischer Studios' Betty Boop while being partially based on Big Brother 3's Amy Crews. Toot demands to be the center of attention, cuts herself with razor blades, practices poor personal hygiene, eats excessively when depressed and often instigates conflict in the house.
- Xandir P. Wifflebottom (voiced by Jack Plotnick): A homosexual and effeminate spoof of young, blonde and handsome swordsman protagonists in video games, particularly Link from The Legend of Zelda series and Cloud Strife from the Final Fantasy series.
- Spanky Ham (voiced by Adam Carolla): A horny, crude-humored, obnoxious and greedy anthropomorphic pig-based parody of various Internet Flash animation characters, specifically from Newgrounds and Adult Swim; his likenesses was inspired by The Real World: San Francisco cast member David "Puck" Rainey.
- Ling-Ling (voiced by Abbey McBride): A psychopathic and homicidal anime-styled battle monster from somewhere in Asia who is a spoof of Pikachu from the Pokémon franchise. He battles using various supernatural powers/abilities, represented with a matching anime-like style, and English subtitles are shown on-camera due to Ling-Ling speaking pseudo-Japanese gibberish (or "Japorean", a portmanteau of Japanese and Korean, as McBride calls it).

== Production ==
=== Animation style ===
Drawn Together's visual style is that of digital ink-and-paint. The style was chosen both for the retro feel it gives the series and for the versatility and freedom it allows the animators, providing an environment in which it is possible to combine many different styles of animation. Another unique aspect of the series is that, where most cartoons present their characters, though animated, as real within the series' universe, the Drawn Together characters retain their identities as cartoon characters even within their animated world and they acknowledge their status as such. The series has cameo appearances by famous characters (or in some cases, clones to avoid infringing copyright) from all across the animated spectrum. In keeping with the various animation styles for the characters, Wooldoor and Toot have four fingers on each hand, whereas Clara, Foxxy, Hero and Xandir have five. In promotional artwork for the show, Toot and Wooldoor are drawn with the standard five fingers, but in the series itself they have four. Whereas most of the characters are drawn with black outlines, Clara and items belonging to her are drawn with soft edges, a reference to Disney animation techniques, which involve "cleanup" of any black outlines. Contrasting, Toot is drawn in the grainy and high-contrast monochrome of her era's technology.

The series was made by Rough Draft Studios in Glendale, California, with much of the animation done at the studio's facilities in South Korea. A gag in "The Drawn Together Clip Show" is that they show a list of all the Korean children who died animating the series.

The film was produced by 6 Point Harness and done completely with Flash animation due to budget cuts.

=== Cancellation ===
A total of three seasons were produced. Season 3 began airing on October 5, 2006, and took a mid-season break which started on November 15, 2006. The second half of season three began airing on October 4, 2007. In March 2007, it was announced that creators Dave Jeser and Matt Silverstein had left Comedy Central and later created DJ & the Fro for their sister channel MTV in 2009, and eventually signed a two-year contract with 20th Century Fox Television to create new series and/or work on the studio's existing programs.

The season three finale included multiple jokes about the series' cancellation. TV Guide listed this episode as a series finale and described the episode as follows: "The series wraps up with the housemates participating in a singing competition as they look back on their recent misadventures."

In March 2008, Tara Strong confirmed that the series had been cancelled, and the back of the third season DVDs box refers to it as the "third and final season".

Since cancellation, the series has partial rotation late-nights and airs uncensored on Comedy Central's Secret Stash and on Logo.

In response to the cancellation, the official page of Drawn Together on Myspace had suggested the fans call Comedy Central and convince them to make a new season.

== Content ==
The plots and humor of Drawn Together are adult-oriented and heavily loaded with shock comedy. The humor is largely raunchy, morbid and satirical in nature, its primary focus being the mockery of stereotypes and the casual exploration of taboo subject matter, such as profanity, masturbation, paraphilia, kink, homosexuality or gay marriage, abortion, rape, incest, pedophilia, bestiality, menstruation, spousal abuse, racism, homophobia, xenophobia, antisemitism, necrophilia, terrorism, graphic violence and death. Episodes such as "Gay Bash" or "A Very Special Drawn Together Afterschool Special", for example, feature the exploration of homosexuality as a central theme. Nearly all episodes feature at least one death, and several episodes feature characters going on killing sprees or perpetrating or becoming victims of mass murder, though the main characters subsequently returned alive and uninjured. The series breaks the fourth wall regularly; on one occasion, it mocks Adam Carolla, the voice of Spanky Ham.

Despite the series' overt and underlined sexuality, the characters' innocent and sensual sides are often the main driving force of the plot (alongside comedic non-sequitur moments intended to parody standard plot lines). This adds romantic comedy, melodrama, action film, war film, court drama and other genres to the pool of spoofing material. Sincere feelings the characters are forced to experience (and comic disregard thereof) seem to add integrity to the plot and imbue every episode with a genuine moral message, made more efficient by constant spoofing of moral message clichés like "character X has learned a valuable lesson".

The hot tub kiss as depicted on promotional posters

Comedy Central's original tagline for the series was "Find out what happens when cartoon characters stop being polite... and start making out in hot tubs", referring to Clara and Foxxy's kiss in the pilot episode. The line is a parody of The Real World's tagline, "Find out what happens when people stop being polite... and start getting real." The aforementioned hot tub kiss is considered one of the show's defining images; Comedy Central based nearly all of its first-season promotional material for Drawn Together on it. In The Drawn Together Movie: The Movie!, a billboard featuring the hot tub kiss is a major plot point in the film and is the main reason why the Network Head is hunting the housemates down in order to kill them in the film, due to the billboard being the cause of his wife and daughter's death.

The extensive use of stereotypes is another controversial aspect of the series, though the intent is actually to make fun of bigotry. As Jess Harnell states in the DVD commentary for "Hot Tub", "Most of the racism on the show is coming from people who are so obviously stupid about it; it really isn't that threatening". (Jewish people are mocked, including creators and principal cast member Tara Strong.) Other content known to be featured on some episodes are occurrences of natural disasters, depictions of dictators and sexual fetishes.

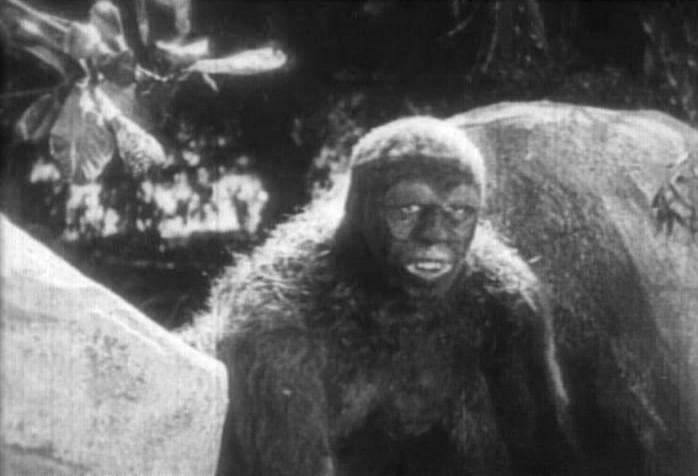
The ape-man looking back is a running gag in Drawn Together. The fragment is originally from the 1925 film The Lost World.

Drawn Together is heavy with popular culture references. Animation is a major source of material; as mentioned above, many characters from comics and animated cartoons make cameo appearances and often are the subjects of parody. Numerous live-action films, TV shows and video games are referenced as well. Reality shows are another prime inspiration, not surprising given that Drawn Together is presented as a reality show that takes place in a cartoon world. Although many of the first-season plots made extensive use of the reality show scenario, this aspect of the show has largely been de-emphasized in later episodes. The spoofing of film and television clichés is another common theme in the series; many Drawn Together stories are parodies of overused plots from film and television.

One notable factor of the series are musical numbers. Some are parodies of real songs (i.e. in "Hot Tub", the song "Black Chick's Tongue" is a parody of "A Whole New World" from Aladdin; in the episode "Super Nanny", the song at the DMV is a riff on "Who's That Guy?" from Grease 2; in "Freaks & Greeks", the song at the end is a take on "Summer Nights" from Grease; and "You'll Really Love Being Abandoned Here" in "Alzheimer's That Ends Well" is a reference to "I Think I'm Gonna Like It Here" from Annie). Other songs are those written by the show's creators/writers, like "The Bully Song" from "Requiem for a Reality Show" and "La-La-La-La-Labia" in "Clara's Dirty Little Secret". Only two episodes ("Lost in Parking Space, Part One" and "Nipple Ring-Ring Goes to Foster Care") do not feature a musical performance.

In terms of continuity, events in different episodes contradict each other, as there is a loose sense of canon. One such example is in "The Other Cousin" and "N.R.A.y RAY", in which Toot is pictured with a penis, something that is not consistent with other episodes. Another is Foxxy's various and contradictory stories about her son Timmy (one involves selling him on the black market, another involves her accidentally shooting him after believing him to be rabid, when he was really just brushing his teeth). Plots and gags are often used that do not make any type of internal sense, but are used as one-off jokes, as when Foxxy, who is in her twenties, is said to have a teenage grandson. Some episodes begin with a fake recap of events supposed to have happened in a (non-existent) previous episode. According to executive producer Bill Freiberger, "Very little on Drawn Together can be considered canon. If you try to find continuity on this show you'll drive yourself nuts. The only thing that's consistent is we try to make the show as funny as possible. And we'd never let a little thing like continuity get in the way of that."

Occasionally, episodes of Drawn Together are shown with less editing for content during Secret Stash, a Comedy Central program aired on weekends at 1am that showcases films (i.e. Not Another Teen Movie), comedy specials (Comedy Central Roast), and animated programs (this and South Park) with uncensored language. Though Secret Stash programs typically have the nudity still censored, Drawn Together is an exception to this. Some nudity not seen in the original broadcast is shown in the Secret Stash version, while the nudity in other scenes is censored with a caption reading "DVD only"; this is done as a way of promoting the show's DVD releases.

== Voice cast ==
Drawn Together features an ensemble cast of veteran voice actors (Tara Strong, Cree Summer, Jess Harnell, Adam Carolla, and James Arnold Taylor) and newcomers to the field (Abbey McBride and Jack Plotnick).

Three of the series' voice actors had worked with creators Dave Jeser and Matt Silverstein on other projects: Jack Plotnick on Action, and Adam Carolla and Abbey McBride on The Man Show. Two of Drawn Together's guest stars also came from the casts of earlier Jeser/Silverstein projects: "The Other Cousin" guest star Sarah Silverman (from Greg the Bunny), and Carolla's Man Show co-host Jimmy Kimmel, who guest-starred in "Xandir and Tim, Sitting in a Tree" and "Alzheimer's That Ends Well".

Tara Strong and James Arnold Taylor had previously worked together on the animated series Mutant League and the video game Final Fantasy X where they voiced the characters of Thrasher and Rikku (Strong) and Cannonball and Tidus (Taylor) respectively.

Principal cast member Tara Strong has stated that she deeply loves the series, as it was such a departure from the family-friendly productions that she was used to working on at the time. The only problems that she had with it were a few jokes related to Anne Frank.

Originally, Xandir was to have been played by Nat Faxon, but he was fired following the first table read because the network felt his portrayal of the character was too stereotypically gay. Actor Jack Plotnick ended up being cast because he could play a gay man without resorting to stereotypical mannerisms such as the gay lisp.

In addition to their regular roles, the series' cast provides many of the minor roles and guest voices on the series, Summer, Strong, Harnell and Taylor in particular. In the DVD commentary for "Hot Tub", Tara Strong jokes that this is because the series does not have a lot of money to pay guest stars. Chris Edgerly appears in the majority of season one and two episodes despite not having a regular role on the series.

== Critical reception ==
The pilot episode, "Hot Tub", was given mediocre reviews, which focused mostly on its crudity. USA Today deemed Drawn Together "the smutty offspring of Real World and Superfriends", stating that the pilot pushed the limits of taste, being overpowered by violence, sex, and disgusting subject matter. According to The New York Times, "Hot Tub", while it had many good sight gags, did not go far enough in parodying reality television. The domination of Clara's racism in the story was criticized as being a weak attempt to "send up racism while still showcasing its cruel excitement". Toot's cutting was praised as a good parody of self-harm presented on reality shows, but Spanky's flatulence was considered more disgusting than humorous.

The pilot episode was given an F rating from Entertainment Weekly, leading to the second-season episode "Xandir and Tim, Sitting in a Tree" having a subplot in which the majority of the housemates seek revenge for the rating. The latter episode also received an F from the magazine. Some reviewers called Drawn Together a "bizarre and highly entertaining series" which has a unique style of humor and "level of self-parody."

Despite this, TV Guide named Drawn Together in its 60 Greatest Cartoons of All Time list in 2013.

== Episodes ==
Season	Episodes	Originally released	
Season	Episodes	First released	Last released
1	7	October 27, 2004	December 15, 2004
2	15	October 19, 2005	March 15, 2006
3	14	October 5, 2006	November 14, 2007
Film		April 20, 2010	

== Distribution ==
=== Syndication and streaming ===
The series previously aired on Logo TV with episodes uncensored.

In May 2019, the series began streaming on the Viacom owned streaming platform, Pluto TV on the Comedy Central Pluto TV channel. The entire series was added to CBS All Access's (now Paramount+) roster in July 2020 among other Paramount Global properties.

=== Home releases ===
Season releases

DVD name	Release date	Discs	Episodes	Special features
Season One Uncensored	October 4, 2005	2	7	Uncensored and extended versions of every episode; Commentary by Dave Jeser and Matt Silverstein (along with cast and crew) on "Hot Tub", "Clara's Dirty Little Secret", "The Other Cousin", and "The One Wherein There Is a Big Twist"; Deleted scenes; Karaoke/sing-along versions of the show's songs; Censored/Uncensored game
Season Two Uncensored	September 25, 2007	2	15	Uncensored and extended versions of every episode; Commentary by Dave Jeser and Matt Silverstein (along with cast and crew) on "Clum Babies", "Super Nanny", "Terms of Endearment", and "A Very Special Drawn Together Afterschool Special"; Commentary on the commentary of "Terms of Endearment"; Behind the scenes interviews with the cast and creators; Karaoke/sing-along versions of the show's songs
Season Three Uncensored	May 13, 2008	2	14	Uncensored and extended versions of every episode; Commentary by Dave Jeser and Matt Silverstein (along with cast and crew) on "Freaks & Greeks", "Lost in Parking Space, Part One", "Drawn Together Babies", and "Breakfast Food Killer"; Original network promos from all three seasons; Karaoke/sing-along versions of the show's songs
Complete Series: Party in Your Box	November 17, 2009	6	36	All three season sets; Get the DTs Drinking Game; Drawn Together: Truth or Dare?; Collectible board game; Sneak peek of the upcoming movie
The Drawn Together Movie: The Movie!	April 20, 2010	1	1	Drawn Together True Confessionals; Drawn Together: The Legacy; Anatomy of an Animated Sex Scene; Re-Animating Drawn Together: From the Small Screen to the Slightly Bigger Screen; D.I.Y. 3D Glasses Additional Scenes: Deleted Scenes; Drawn Together Minisodes; Audio commentary with Matt Silverstein, Dave Jeser, Jordan Young & Kurt Vanzo
Drawn Together: The Complete Collection	October 10, 2017	7	37	All three season sets; The Drawn Together Movie: The Movie!

The first season of Drawn Together was released on DVD by Paramount Home Entertainment on October 4, 2005. Its release was timed to coincide to be the same month as the premiere of Season Two on television on October 19, 2005. The set includes all seven aired first-season episodes. (By the time the release was finalized, it had been determined that the unaired "Terms of Endearment" would air during Season Two, so it was left off the set and eventually released as part of the Season Two set.) The profanity and nudity are intact and uncensored. Some shows also contain additional lines and scenes. Special features include audio commentary on select episodes by creators Dave Jeser and Matt Silverstein along with assorted cast and crew members, in addition to deleted scenes and karaoke/sing-along versions of the show's songs.

The set has a game called the Censored/Uncensored game: A line is given, and the viewer must decide if the line aired on television as given (uncensored), or if it had to be altered significantly or deleted (censored). Some of the censored lines appear intact in the extended DVD version of the episode. Getting at least 11 of the 19 questions correct unlocks a hidden feature, a prank phone call by Jeser and Silverstein to their agent regarding the royalties they are to receive for the DVD audio commentaries.

The song "Time of My Life" from "Dirty Pranking No. 2" had to be left off the first season DVD because of copyright concerns. The show mocked the situation in the lyrics of the replacement music.

Season Two Uncensored was released on September 25, 2007. Like the Season One set, the set features audio commentaries by Jeser and Silverstein along with assorted cast and crew members, as well as karaoke/singalong versions of the show's songs. The set also contains, in the words of the box art, "potentially annoying" commentary on the commentary for "Terms of Endearment". The behind-the-scenes interviews in the set are the same ones that appear on Comedy Central's website, which feature each of the voice actors talking about his or her character, along with a separate interview with creators Jeser and Silverstein. Tara Strong does two separate interviews, one for each of her characters (Princess Clara and Toot Braunstein).

The set includes the controversial horse shot from "Terms of Endearment", which was not allowed to air on television.

Season Three Uncensored was released on May 13, 2008.

The censored broadcast cuts of the episodes have never been made available on DVD or any other physical media, but they are available on Amazon.com's streaming service, with the original music.

== Broadcast ==
The show aired on Comedy Central for three seasons from October 27, 2004 to November 14, 2007.

== See also ==
- Total Drama, a Canadian animated television series that parodies reality television.
