= Golan the Insatiable =

American adult animated television series

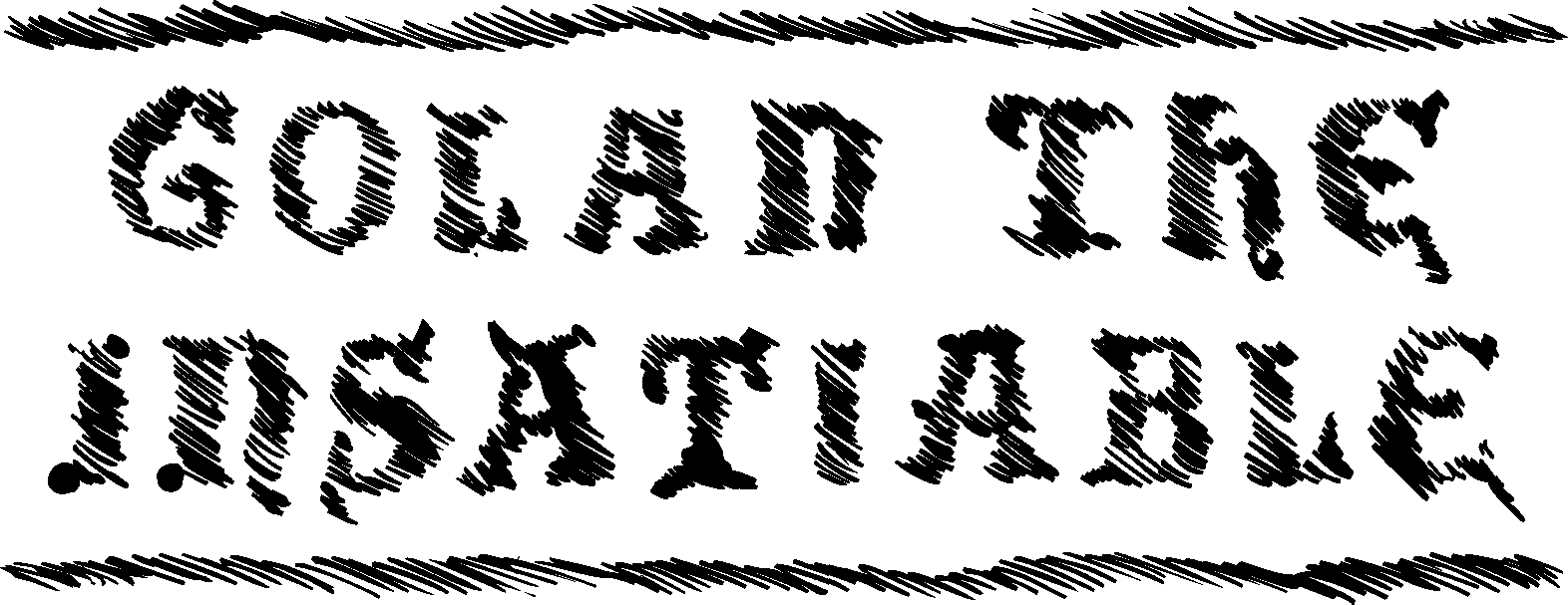
- Genre: Dark comedy Fantasy
- Created by: Josh Miller
- Developed by: Dave Jeser & Matt Silverstein
- Creative director: Ben Jones
- Voices of: Josh Miller (Season 1); Mary Mack (Season 1); Maria Bamford; Rachel Butera; Matt Silverstein; Nick Rutherford; Rob Riggle (Season 2); Aubrey Plaza (Season 2)
- Composer: Mark Rivers
- Country of origin: United States
- Original language: English
- No. of seasons: 2
- No. of episodes: 12

Production
- Executive producers: Nick Weidenfeld; Hend Baghdady; Dave Jeser; Matt Silverstein; Josh Miller (Season 1)
- Producer: Greg Lloyd Brown (Season 2)
- Editors: Al LeVine; James Atkinson
- Running time: 11 minutes (Season 1); 22 minutes (Season 2)
- Production companies: Double Hemm; Amazing Schlock (Season 1); Friends Night; ADHD Studios

Original release
- Network: Fox
- Release: November 23, 2013 – July 19, 2015

Golan the Insatiable is an American adult animated television series created by Josh Miller and developed by Dave Jeser & Matt Silverstein for Fox. It premiered on November 23, 2013 along with Lucas Bros. Moving Co.; it officially premiered on January 11, 2014. It is based on stories written by Miller that appeared on the website Something Awful. It aired on Fox's Animation Domination High-Def programming block.

Golan the Insatiable was picked up by Fox for a second season consisting of 6 half-hour prime-time episodes featuring a new voice cast and alternate continuity. The season premiered on May 31, 2015 on Fox's Sunday Funday lineup.

== Plot ==
Golan the Insatiable is a demigod warlord who reigned over the dimension of Gkruool with an iron fist before he was summoned to Earth by Dylan, the goth daughter of the Beekler family in the town of Oak Grove, Minnesota. He stays with her after finding out that his acolyte Kruung has overthrown him for control of Gkruool during his absence. Besides learning about Earth's customs and causing havoc in Oak Grove, Golan plans to build up his power so that he can return to Gkruool and take revenge on Kruung.

== Characters ==
=== Main characters ===
- Golan the Insatiable (voiced by Josh Miller in Season One, Rob Riggle in Season Two) - Golan the Insatiable is the "Godlord terrible of Gkruool, crusher of wills, defiler of all." In the original shorts, he was banished by Gkruool's rebels and lives with Dylan Beekler. In the 30 minute reboot, Golan was accidentally summoned to Earth by Dylan, who had acquired the legendary Gkruoolian Tome of Infinite Evil, and later remains with her after finding that Kruung has overthrown him during his disappearance. They both enjoy causing misery to the citizens of the city. In season one, he gets used to Earth's customs. In season two, he plans to take over Oak Grove then Minnesota along with Dylan.
- Dylan Beekler (voiced by Mary Mack in Season One, Aubrey Plaza in Season Two) - Dylan Beekler is a goth girl who's Golan's new acolyte. She used to get suspended a lot at school. Her mother is Carole Beekler, and her older sister is Alexis Beekler (although later, it is revealed that Alexis is Dylan's mother, with Carole lying to protect her daughter and granddaughter from emotional pain and complications). Despite her hatred to most people in "Winter is Staying," she enjoyed being her mom's favorite and enjoyed spending time with her. Also in "Deer Uncle Gerald," she couldn't go through with stealing the ashes of her Great Uncle Gerald for her and Golan's plan and let his ashes in the river as she wishes.
- Carole Beekler (voiced by Maria Bamford) - Carole Beekler is Dylan and Alexis' single mother in season two. She was initially extremely terrified of Golan but eventually got used to him. Although she doesn't much approve of Dylan's goth lifestyle she still loves her, although she is seen being with Alexis a lot as well. According to Alexis, she is her mother's favorite child.
- Richard Beekler (voiced by Matt Silverstein) - Richard Beekler is the husband of Carole Beekler and father of the Beekler children. He doesn't consider Golan as family as much as the others. He is not included in the reboot. It is claimed by Carole that Dylan doesn't have a father and implied that he left her at some point. It was also claimed by Alexis that Richard died from contracting "Robot AIDS."
- Alexis Beekler (voiced by Rachel Butera) - Alexis Beekler is Carole's daughter, Dylan's sister, and Keith's girlfriend. She is very obnoxious and slightly dimwitted. She constantly makes fun of Dylan by calling her names like "Butt Licks" and "Fart Sponge", just as similar as Dylan loves harassing her, it has also been shown that Dylan has lit her on fire numerous times. Despite her intelligence, she figured out Dylan and Golan's plan about winter and was the only one who was able to get her to stop in "Winter is Staying". She enjoys spending time with her mother and always has her back.
- Keith Knudsen Jr. (voiced by Nick Rutherford) - Keith Knudsen Jr. is Alexis' boyfriend who is the son of Keith Knudsen Sr. He is friendly with Golan. Alexis is the only one in the Beekler family who tolerates him.

=== Recurring characters ===
- Mayor of Oak Grove (voiced by Josh Miller in Season One, John DiMaggio in Season Two) - The unnamed Mayor of Oak Grove is Oak Grove's jolly and short mayor. It is hinted he might be gay. He carries a duck around with him as the city mascot.
- Mrs. Budnick (voiced by Kaitlyn Robrock) - Mrs. Budnick is Oak Grove Elementary's short-tempered elderly teacher.
- Mackenzie B (voiced by Abbey DiGregorio in Season One, Tara Strong in Season Two) - Mackenzie B is Dylan's archenemy and classmate in school who constantly makes fun of Dylan. She is usually afraid of Golan as her mother forces her to invite Dylan to her parties.
- Swingley (voiced by Maria Bamford) - Swingley is a new kid in Dylan's class whom she has a crush on. In Season 2, she admits she likes him only for Swingley to reveal that he is gay and already has a boyfriend.
- Keith Knudsen Sr. (voiced by Ken Marino) - The father of Keith Knudsen Jr. and the husband of Go-Go Knudsen. He often expects his son to succeed in specific things.
- Go-Go Knudsen (voiced by Cree Summer) - The busty mother of Keith Knudsen Jr. and the wife of Keith Knudsen Sr.

== Episodes ==
=== Series overview ===
Season	Episodes	Originally aired	
Season	Episodes	First aired	Last aired
1	6	November 23, 2013	March 1, 2014
2	6	May 31, 2015	July 19, 2015

=== Season 1 (2013–14) ===
No. overall	No. in season	Title	Directed by	Written by	Original release date	Prod. code
1	1	"Ragin' Fun"	Rusty Yunusoff	Josh Miller and Patrick Casey	November 23, 2013	101
Golan and Dylan get suspicious of Alexis' boyfriend Keith. So they end up following them to a water park called "Ragin' Fun Bayou Water Park" where Golan gets separated from Dylan.
2	2	"A Pox on Your Pox"	Douglas Einar Olsen	Josh Miller and Patrick Casey	January 11, 2014	102
At the time when Dylan gets the chickenpox, Golan makes plans to make a portal gate during a meteor shower to harness its powers so that he can return to Gkruool and reclaim his throne.
3	3	"Escape to Tooth Mountain"	David Stephan and Douglas Einar Olsen	Josh Miller and Patrick Casey	January 18, 2014	103
Dylan loses a tooth while at the family fun restaurant Pepe Roni. Upon learning about the tooth fairy, Golan plans to trap the tooth fairy and have romance with her.
4	4	"Deer Uncle Gerald"	Aldin Baroza	Josh Miller and Patrick Casey	January 25, 2014	104
Golan is enraged when the Beekler Family ditches him to attend a funeral of Richard's Uncle Gerald. When Golan catches up to the Beeklers, he plans to have Richard say his final goodbyes to Uncle Gerald by having Dylan steal Uncle Gerald's ashes and performing a ritual that involves the ashes being fed to a virgin deer.
5	5	"I Can Smell That Cheep Clone from Here"	Douglas Einar Olsen	Josh Miller and Patrick Casey	February 1, 2014	105
Golan learns about Easter and the resurrection of Jesus. In an attempt to mimic Jesus' Easter resurrection, Golan accidentally creates a clone of himself who proves to have a mind of his own and is doing good deeds around Oak Grove.
6	6	"Dylan Crushes Reading"	Chase Conley and Mike McCraw	Josh Miller and Patrick Casey	March 1, 2014	106
Golan discovers that Dylan can't read. In order to help Dylan read, Golan puts her through different challenges that involves pronouncing words and saving a boy named Swingley.

=== Season 2 (2015) ===
No. overall	No. in season	Title	Directed by	Written by	Original release date	Prod. code	US viewers (millions)
7	1	"Pilot"	Douglas Einar Olsen	Dave Jeser, Matt Silverstein, and Jordan Young	May 31, 2015	201	1.59
A mighty demigod warlord named Golan finds himself in Oak Grove, Minnesota after being inadvertently summoned there by Dylan Beekler, who accidentally found an ancient Gkruoolian tome containing various spells. Though he manages to return to his world, Golan finds that his former acolyte Kruung has subverted his throne in his absence, and Golan is forced to retreat to Earth. Golan moves in with the Beekler family, intending to return once he has the means to reclaim his throne.
8	2	"Winter Is Staying"	Douglas Einar Olsen	Josh Miller and Patrick Casey	June 7, 2015	202	1.20
As winter's end draws near, Golan and Dylan hatch a scheme to prevent spring from arriving by using the magic of dance, all the while trying to keep Alexis from uncovering their plans.
9	3	"Shame on Pee"	Douglas Einar Olsen	Josh Miller and Patrick Casey	June 14, 2015	204	1.41
When Golan discovers Dylan has wet the bed, Golan blackmails her in an attempt to get an invite to Keith's "Sick 17" party; he succeeds, and Dylan, upset by Golan's treachery and trying to get her crush Swingley into the cult, plots to get even with Golan by revealing his own bed-wetting. Golan accidentally releases a shame-dependent demon called the Shamunculous, and it possesses Swingley and others while plotting its own rise to power.
10	4	"Shell Raiser"	Douglas Einar Olsen	Nick Rutherford	June 28, 2015	205	1.00
Following Mackenzie B.'s birthday, Dylan finds a bacteria-covered turtle with a birthday entertainer and steals it. Upon naming the turtle Shell Raiser, Golan and Dylan plot to use it to poison Oak Grove at the town's Annual Chili Cook-Out.
11	5	"On Golan Pond"	Douglas Einar Olsen	Josh Miller and Patrick Casey	July 12, 2015	203	1.14
During a weekend at the Knudsen Family Cabin at Leech Lake, Golan sheds his skin in the wilderness, leaving Dylan to protect him for 24 hours. Golan is abducted by a mother wolf, and one of the wolf cubs drinks Golan's blood and mutates into a monster. Meanwhile, Carole befriends a Party-Bot and develops a crush on it. At the same time, Keith Knudsen Sr. encourages his son Keith to commit outercourse with Alexis.
12	6	"Golan the Impregnable"	Douglas Einar Olsen	Jordan Young	July 19, 2015	206	1.21
Golan attends Oak Grove High School with Alexis to get crowned King in the school dance as part of his plan to become the King of Earth. Meanwhile, Dylan worries that she is losing Golan to Alexis' world of popularity and parties, in the same manner in which Alexis stole Keith Knudsen Jr. from her some years prior. Unwilling to let him go, Dylan attempts to sabotage his plans by using a Gkruoolian spell to get Golan pregnant.
