= DJ & the Fro =

American television series

- DJ (left) and the Fro (right)
- Created by: Dave Jeser; Matt Silverstein
- Starring: Matt Silverstein; Nat Faxon; Cree Summer; James Arnold Taylor
- Country of origin: United States
- No. of seasons: 1
- No. of episodes: 20

Production
- Executive producers: Chris Prynoski; Shannon Prynoski
- Running time: 22 minutes
- Production companies: Titmouse, Inc. Double Hemm; MTV Production Development

Original release
- Network: MTV
- Release: May 31 – July 18, 2009

DJ & the Fro is an adult animated series created by Dave Jeser and Matt Silverstein for MTV. The show focuses on two co-workers, DJ and The Fro, who work at the fictitious company Oppercon Industries. They rarely do work, and instead look for funny videos on the Internet, which they comment on (similar to Beavis and Butt-head and Station Zero with music videos). The show’s creators, Dave Jeser and Matt Silverstein originally created Comedy Central's Drawn Together.

Within weeks of its debut, DJ & the Fro was moved from its 5:00 pm EST time slot to 12:30 am EST time slot due to the Parents Television Council deeming it "too racy for daytime T.V."

== Cast ==
- Matt Silverstein as DJ
- Nat Faxon as The Fro
- Cree Summer as Doreen, Gigi, Additional voices
- James Arnold Taylor as Ken, Mr. Balding, Additional voices

== Episodes ==
No.	Title	Original release date	Prod. code
1	"Sexual Harassment"	May 31, 2009	107
Two twenty-something slackers spend their days trolling the Internet for outrageous videos.
2	"Emergency Contact"	June 15, 2009	104
DJ and Fro must stay late on a Friday to finish their personal information sheets.
3	"I Love You"	June 16, 2009	105
DJ accidentally tells a client he loves him.
4	"Horowitz"	June 17, 2009	111
The boys are paired up with a new guy for a project, but worry when he has to be home by sundown.
5	"Alpaca"	June 18, 2009	114
DJ and Fro pool their paychecks to buy an Alpaca.
6	"Pedophile"	June 22, 2009	101
DJ unwittingly befriends a pedophile in a chat room.
7	"Breast Milk"	June 23, 2009	106
Fro develops a bond with a co-worker after accidentally drinking her breast milk.
8	"Birds"	June 25, 2009	113
DJ believes that Jim the Janitor is relaying prophetic messages from birds.
9	"Fred"	June 29, 2009	112
Desperate for approval, Fro uses information about Balding's past in an attempt to heal him.
10	"La Pequena"	June 30, 2009	102
While preparing for a presentation, DJ and the Fro get sidetracked by a horrifying video.
11	"Gambling"	July 1, 2009	103
Fro becomes jealous when DJ shows interest in Greta.
12	"Sub Boss"	July 2, 2009	116
When Mr. Balding calls in sick, a substitute boss turns the office into a playground.
13	"Intern"	July 6, 2009	119
DJ falls in love in a newly hired intern.
14	"Nipples"	July 7, 2009	109
Fro lowers the office thermostat, causing DJ to get stiff nipples.
15	"Sick Kid"	July 8, 2009	117
DJ donates Fro's personal day to a coworker with a terminally ill son, prompting a angered Fro to attempt to reclaim his day off.
16	"Notary Public"	July 9, 2009	115
Fro becomes a notary public and discovers that the organization operates like an organized crime syndicate.
17	"Egg"	July 14, 2009	110
Wanting an office assistant, DJ and Fro must prove their responsibility by caring for an egg.
18	"Mail Room"	July 15, 2009	118
DJ and The Fro are tasked to visit the mail room.
19	"Employee of The Month"	July 16, 2009	108
Fro becomes Employee of the Month.
20	"Fake Video"	July 18, 2009	120
DJ and The Fro face competition from two new employees, Milo and Buttcut, who take over their habit of sending cool videos to the entire office.

== Reception ==
Common Sense Media rated the show 2 out of 5 stars.
