= Accidental Love =

2015 American comedy film

- Theatrical release poster
- Directed by: David O. Russell (as Stephen Greene)
- Screenplay by: Kristin Gore (Note: Gore is credited as a writer twice; first by herself, and again as part of a team with Silverstein and Jeser.); Matt Silverstein; Dave Jeser
- Based on: Sammy's Hill by Kristin Gore
- Produced by: Kia Jam; Judd Payne; Matthew Rhodes
- Starring: Jessica Biel; Jake Gyllenhaal; Catherine Keener; James Marsden; Tracy Morgan; James Brolin
- Cinematography: Max Malkin
- Edited by: Mark Bourgeois; Robert K. Lambert
- Music by: John Swihart
- Production companies: K. JAM Media; Persistent Entertainment; Vocal Yokels
- Distributed by: Millennium Entertainment
- Release date: February 10, 2015
- Running time: 100 minutes
- Country: United States
- Language: English
- Budget: $26 million
- Box office: $139,436

Accidental Love is a 2015 American romantic comedy film directed by David O. Russell (under a pseudonym) and written by Kristin Gore, Matt Silverstein, and Dave Jeser, based on Gore's 2004 novel Sammy's Hill. The film stars Jessica Biel and Jake Gyllenhaal, and includes Kirstie Alley in her final film role.

Production started in 2008 under the title Nailed, but filming was frequently halted due to financial difficulties, leading to Russell quitting the project in 2010. The film was completed without his involvement and he has since disowned it, leaving the finished product credited to "Stephen Greene". The film was released online on February 10, 2015, before a limited release on March 20, 2015, by Millennium Entertainment. Accidental Love was panned by critics and was a massive financial failure, grossing a mere $139,436 against a $26 million production budget.

== Plot ==
Alice is a waitress in a small Indiana town. She and her boyfriend, Indiana State Trooper Scott, are on a dinner date. Just as he pulls out a ring and starts proposing to her, a repairman using a nail gun in the middle of the fancy restaurant falls and fires a nail into her head.

Doctors refuse to operate, because she does not have health insurance. They inform her that the nail will influence her psychologically, making her sexually uninhibited, prone to fits of anger and rage, and randomly speak Portuguese. Scott temporarily rescinds his proposal, not wanting to marry a woman prone to bouts of anger.

Alice's parents hold a fundraiser to cover her operation, but only come up with $600. Aunt Rita, the local vet, performs a free but unsuccessful operation. Alice reacts with a temper tantrum, and Scott breaks things off; he starts dating Alice's co-worker.

Alice is consoled by local pastor Reverend Norm, who is suffering from an experimental drug's effect which caused a perpetual erection. He is accompanied by Keyshawn, who has a problem with a prolapsed anus that is also pending treatment. Neither of them has healthcare coverage.

Alice sees junior Congressman Howard Birdwell speak on television about how he wants to serve the people of Indiana, inviting his constituents to bring their issues to him. Alice decides to go to Washington, D.C., with Reverend Norm and Keyshawn.

They reach Howard's office, but are sent away when House Whip Pam Hendrickson arrives. Hendrickson is bullying Howard into helping her become Speaker of the House, and also raise funds for her military Moon-base initiative.

Keyshawn falls in love with Congress security guard Rakeesha and departs with her on a date, while Reverend Norm goes back to their motel to nurse his erection. Alice waits in the hallway for Howard. Just when they meet, her lack of sexual inhibition kicks in, with the two having sex in a cloakroom. Howard promises to help Alice if she agrees to support the Moon-base funding.

Hendrickson has garnered the support of the Squaw Girls, who are falsely promised an appearance by Shakira at their national jamboree.

Alice and the Squaw Girls do their bit to promote the Moon-base at a press event. However, House Speaker Buck McCoy is so impressed with the Moon-base hype that he makes it "his" project, taking credit while enjoying the Squaw Girl cookies that were baked in honor of the Moon-base. McCoy chokes on his cookie and though they try to revive him with a defibrillator, Hendrickson secretly unplugs it and McCoy dies.

At the funeral, Alice hijacks the podium and convinces those present that McCoy wanted everyone to have healthcare and did not care about the Moon-base. The Squaw Girls, upset with the betrayal over Shakira, promote the Moon-base cookies as toxic and start promoting the "Alice's Law" healthcare bill.

Hendrickson plots revenge. She has her aide, Edwin, afflict the Squaw Girls with poison ivy and create a false narrative that they are promoting childhood lesbianism. Howard disappears and Hendrickson brings Scott from Indiana to convince Alice to return home as his girlfriend. Alice discovers the ruse and asks Scott to help her. Scott finds Howard at a retreat, trying to regain his manhood, and convinces Howard to return.

When congress convenes and Hendrickson is promoted to Speaker, she reveals that Howard slept with multiple female lobbyists to promote his own issues, doing the same with Alice. Howard confesses, drops the health care bill and returns to the party fold. Alice tries to ask congress to consider her plight, but they overwhelmingly vote against the health care bill.

Alice is packing to leave when it is revealed that Howard successfully tacked a health care bill – tightly specified to cover the maladies of Alice and her friends – to the moon-base bill. The bill passed, with Hendrickson admitting to reporters that members of Congress rarely read the bills. Howard is forced to resign.

Reverend Norm officiates the wedding of Rakeesha and new congressional candidate Keyshawn. Alice is about to propose to Howard when Keyshawn damages her eye with a champagne cork.

== Cast ==
- Jessica Biel as Alice Eckle
- Jake Gyllenhaal as Howard Birdwell
- Catherine Keener as Rep. Pam Hendrickson
- James Marsden as Scott
- Tracy Morgan as Keyshawn
- Paul Reubens as Edwin
- Beverly D'Angelo as Helen Eckle
- Kurt Fuller as Reverend Norm
- Malinda Williams as Rakeesha
- David Ramsey as Congressman Harshtone
- Kirstie Alley as Aunt Rita
- James Brolin as Speaker Buck McCoy

== Production ==
Red Wagon Productions' Douglas Wick and Lucy Fisher first developed the property, hiring Kristin Gore (daughter of Al Gore) to adapt the screenplay based on her 2004 novel Sammy's Hill. In 2008, Russell was named the director of the film, then titled Nailed. Russell, Wick, and Fisher were reportedly promised a budget of $26 million by Capitol Films, a production company led by then-Hollywood newcomer David Bergstein. Principal photography began in April 2008, in Columbia, South Carolina. That month, James Caan dropped out of the film, after "creative differences" over his character's death scene. Production was shut down frequently—as many as 14 times—for nonpayment of the cast and crew, leading to walk-outs by stars Biel and Gyllenhaal as well as several crew members. Bergstein attributed the film's financial woes to the 2008 financial collapse, but the filmmakers believed they were being "intentionally squeezed." In a dispute over control of the film, and to prevent the possibility of Capitol releasing an unpolished version of the film, Wick and Fisher decided to withhold film negatives and postpone shooting the crucial sequence in which Biel's character is injured with a nail gun until the final day of filming. As a result of one of the unions pulling support for the film with only two days left to shoot, the sequence was not shot and the film was left incomplete.

In early 2010, the film's financier, Ronald Tutor, who controlled the film's rights along with Bergstein, paid millions of dollars to get several films, including Nailed, out of a foreclosure action. Bergstein hired an editor to assemble a cut of the film that was shown to Russell when he was asked to return and film reshoots. Russell and Tutor were unable to strike a deal and Russell permanently left the production in July. According to The Hollywood Reporter, Russell's primary grievance was Wick and Fisher being pushed to accept 50% pay cuts. The producers, who also left the film, called the requested concessions "unfair, unprofessional and detrimental to the movie." Russell said of quitting the film: "This has been a painful process for me. The multiple production delays and stoppages, which were caused by David Bergstein and preceded Ron Tutor's direct involvement with me, have now spanned two years, and the circumstances under which the film would now be completed are much different on several fundamental levels than when we embarked several years ago. I, unfortunately, am no longer involved in the project and cannot call it 'my' film. I wish Ron Tutor well." Contractual agreements required Biel and Tracy Morgan to film reshoots, which did not involve Russell.

Capitol Films went bankrupt in 2010 and the property was purchased in 2014 by independent distributor Millennium Entertainment for an undisclosed sum. Retitled Accidental Love, a cut was assembled under producer Kia Jam, a former executive with Capitol, who said, "People are expecting to see a broken film, and it's not. We tried very much to be respectful of the creative forces behind it." With the film set to be released, Russell negotiated with the Directors Guild of America to remove his name from the film; he is credited for his roles as director and co-writer as "Stephen Greene," an alternative to the former official pseudonym, Alan Smithee, used by directors wishing to disown a film.

== Release ==
In March 2011, an unfinished cut of the film was screened in Los Angeles. The film was released on VOD on February 10, 2015. The film was given a limited theatrical release on March 20, 2015. It was released on DVD and Blu-ray in the United States on April 28, 2015.

== Reception ==
=== Critical response ===
The film was panned by critics. On the review aggregator website Rotten Tomatoes, 9% of 35 critics' reviews are positive, with an average rating of 3.4/10. The website's consensus reads: "Cobbling together an unfinished satire on the healthcare system and contorting it into a dopey romance, Accidental Love is a cynical repurposing of unrealized potential." Metacritic, which uses a weighted average, assigned the film a score of 20 out of 100, based on 13 critics, indicating "generally unfavorable" reviews.

A.A. Dowd of The A.V. Club wrote: "To be fair to whoever refashioned Accidental Love from the abandoned scraps of Nailed, there’s little reason to believe that the ideal, untroubled version of the material would have been a comedic masterstroke." Following a home video release by Mongrel Media in Canada, Dowd accused the company of quoting his review out of context, making a negative film review look like a positive one, in an article titled "No, I didn't call your shitty movie a 'comedic masterstroke'". In response to the accusation, Mongrel Media issued an apology and said they would remove the quote from further prints of the DVD.

Richard Roeper of the Chicago Sun-Times wrote: "The satire is broad and forced and unfunny, there’s no cadence to the setups and visual punch lines, and the likable cast is hopelessly lost. Some disasters should remain forgotten."

=== Box office ===
After its seven years of production troubles, Accidental Love received a limited theatrical release, earning $135,436 at the worldwide box office against a budget of $26 million.
