= Action (TV series) =

American comedy television series

- Genre: Sitcom
- Created by: Chris Thompson
- Starring: Jay Mohr; Illeana Douglas; Jarrad Paul; Buddy Hackett; Jack Plotnick
- Opening theme: "Even A Dog Can Shake Hands" performed by Warren Zevon
- Country of origin: United States
- Original language: English
- No. of seasons: 1
- No. of episodes: 13 (5 unaired)

Production
- Executive producers: Joel Silver; Chris Thompson; Don Reo; Barry Katz
- Camera setup: Single-camera
- Running time: 30 minutes
- Production companies: Silver Pictures Television; Christopher Thompson Productions; Columbia TriStar Television

Original release
- Network: Fox
- Release: September 16 – December 2, 1999

Action is an American dark comedy series about a Hollywood producer named Peter Dragon, who is trying to recover from his last box-office failure. It aired on Fox from September 16 to December 2, 1999. The series was critically praised for its irreverent and sometimes hostile look at Hollywood culture. Thirteen episodes were produced. The show was created by Chris Thompson and the show runner was Don Reo. Future Saturday Night Live cast member Will Forte was the story editor for twelve episodes, and wrote three.

== Characters ==
=== Main ===
- Peter Dragon, played by Jay Mohr, is the head of Dragonfire Films. Peter got his start as a screenwriter for gay pornography, but eventually moved up the ladder of Hollywood as a hotshot producer of tasteless action films. Under tremendous pressure to make his next film a big success, Peter is bossy, arrogant, and unscrupulous.
- Wendy Ward, played by Illeana Douglas, is a former child actress as the cute star of the TV show, The Elephant Princess (not to be confused with The Elephant Princess). She had been a teen cocaine addict, and is now a high priced hooker with a heart of gold. Peter names her Vice President of Production at Dragonfire Films and has a romantic open relationship. Douglas later called this role "the greatest part offered to me in my career".
- Lonnie Dragon, played by Buddy Hackett, is Peter's uncle and chief of security at Dragonfire Films. Lonnie and Peter seem to understand each other perfectly.
- Stuart Glazer, played by Jack Plotnick, is President of Production at Dragonfire Films. Stuart desperately wants to be taken seriously as a Hollywood developer, but is frequently abused and ordered around by Peter. In spite of his important sounding position, Stuart is often asked to do demeaning tasks like babysit, have suits dry-cleaned, and order gift baskets for star talent.
- Adam Rafkin, played by Jarrad Paul, is a Jewish struggling screenwriter whose screenplay, Beverly Hills Gun Club, was picked up by Dragonfire Films for development. Adam's script was actually bought mistakenly by Dragonfire Films because his name was confused with the much better known writer Adam Rifkin.

=== Supporting ===
- Asher, played by John Vargas, is the Eurotrash maître d' that runs the high-end restaurant where every power player in town lunches. Getting the right table is vital, and Asher wields his power with the same aplomb as Peter does. Watching Peter squirm is one of Asher's delights.
- Bobby Gianopolis, played by Lee Arenberg, is the chief executive of the unnamed movie studio. He uses menacing threats to get what he wants from Dragonfire, such as withdrawing his massive financial backing or exposing his gigantic penis. He is homosexual, but married Jane, Peter's ex-wife, to quell any rumors of such. Many critics have suggested that Bobby is a parody of former FOX CEO Barry Diller.
- Jane Dragon, played by Cindy Ambuehl, is Peter's ex-wife. She married Bobby Gianopolis mostly to spite Peter. She is manipulative, scheming, and is so orally gifted she can hum and whistle at the same time. She has a daughter by Peter named Georgia and was pregnant with his second child, unknown to him.
- Georgia Dragon, played by Sara Paxton, is Peter's daughter by Jane. 11–12 years old, she is deceptively innocent but mildly stone-hearted for her age, a trait she gets from her parents.
- Jenny, played by Erin Daniels, is a struggling Hollywood career woman. She used to work at UPN, but after having sex with Peter, moved on to become a production assistant at Dragonfire Films, where she then had sex with Wendy. She is in competition with Stuart.
- Cole Riccardi, played by Richard Burgi, is a famous action star who has been in many of Peter's movies. He is introspective, self-obsessed and secretly gay.
- Connie Hunt, played by Amy Aquino, is the aggressive publicist assigned to Peter Dragon by Bobby Gianapolis after a major public relations disaster. She is dry, practical, and cold-hearted.
- Titus Scroad, played by R. Lee Ermey, is an eccentric American movie director loosely parodying real-life Italian director Tinto Brass (albeit lightly crossed with Terrence Malick).] He has a predilection for hydro-colonic therapy and tends to accentuate his bravado by grabbing his listener's testicles.
- Holden van Dorn, played by Fab Filippo, is a hotshot young actor, with a very public record of alcohol and drug abuse.
- Reagan Lauren Busch, played by Jennifer Lyons, is a sexy starlet with an anxious appetite and recurrent weight problems.

Action also frequently used celebrities playing themselves in cameo appearance, including Keanu Reeves, Sandra Bullock, Salma Hayek, and David Hasselhoff.

== Theme song ==
The song in the opening credits, "Even A Dog Can Shake Hands", was performed by Warren Zevon from his album Sentimental Hygiene.

== Episodes ==
No. overall	DVD order	Title	Directed by	Written by	Original release date	Prod. code
1	1	"Pilot"	Ted Demme	Chris Thompson	September 16, 1999	100
2	2	"Re-Enter the Dragon"	John Whitesell	Chris Thompson	September 16, 1999	101
3	3	"Blood Money"	Bryan Gordon	Don Reo	September 23, 1999	102
4	4	"Blowhard"	John Whitesell	Don Reo	September 30, 1999	103
5	5	"Mr. Dragon Goes to Washington"	Danny Leiner	Ron Zimmerman	October 21, 1999	108
6	6	"Twelfth Step to Hell"	Gil Junger	Will Forte	October 28, 1999	104
7	9	"Strong Sexual Content"	John Fortenberry	Don Reo	December 2, 1999	110
8	10	"Lights, Camera, Action"	James D. Parriott	Adam Hamburger & David Hamburger	December 2, 1999	107
9	7	"Dragon's Blood"	Adam Bernstein	Adam Hamburger & David Hamburger	Unaired	105
10	8	"Love Sucks"	John Fortenberry	Jim Vallely	Unaired	106
11	11	"Dead Man Floating"	Larry Shaw	Dave Jeser & Matt Silverstein	Unaired	109
12	13	"Last Ride of the Elephant Princess"	Vahan Moosekian	Jim Vallely & Ron Zimmerman	Unaired	111
13	12	"One Easy Piece"	Don Reo	Will Forte	Unaired	112

== Reception ==
Caryn James of The New York Times said "the show is truly subversive and daring in its scabrous attitude". Tom Shales of The Washington Post called it "the most daring and outrageous new comedy of the season", and The Seattle Times called it "a dead-on satire of lost souls in the entertainment biz, with enough boldness to qualify for cable viewing". Ken Tucker of Entertainment Weekly gave the series a grade of B, saying, "Action shreds Hollywood corporate culture more viciously than current big-screen spoofs like Bowfinger and The Muse. The difference is, Action's acid heartlessness renders it a more artful but ultimately less likable piece of work."

David Zurawik of The Baltimore Sun found the series insulting and the pilot episode in particular to be culturally insensitive. He wondered whether audiences are supposed to identify with or despise Peter Dragon.

== Broadcast and syndication ==
Fox canceled it due to ratings. Of the 13 produced episodes, only 8 ran on Fox in 1999. The remaining five episodes were eventually broadcast on other networks such as FX and Comedy Central. This is the first Fox series to receive a TV-MA rating.

The show reran on IFC from 2012 to 2013.

== Home media ==
On February 21, 2006, Sony Pictures Home Entertainment released the complete series on DVD in Region 1.

On August 27, 2013, it was announced that Mill Creek Entertainment had acquired the rights to various series from the Sony Pictures Television library including Action. The complete series was subsequently re-released on April 1, 2014.

As of March 2009, the show can be purchased on iTunes.
