= Greg Franklin =

American cartoonist and animation director

- Occupation: Animation director / Co-founder of Six Point Harness
- Known for: The Drawn Together Movie: The Movie!, Prison Pit
- Website: http://www.6pointmedia.com/directors/greg-franklin/

Greg Franklin is an American cartoonist and animation director. He is the co-founder of Six Point Harness (6PH), a Los Angeles-based animation studio that develops and produces animated television programming, feature films, music videos and web-based content.

Greg has presided over several dozen hours of all manner of animated entertainment and is best known for directing The Drawn Together Movie: The Movie! for Comedy Central, the animated sequences for Cosmos: A Spacetime Odyssey, and episodes of MTV's Good Vibes. He has also helmed many other animated projects and live-action/animation hybrids like Where My Dogs At?, animated segments of Sony Pictures' Black Dynamite, FOX's Fringe, NBC's Medium and Drop Dead Diva, TV commercials for MetLife, KIA and Taco Bell, as well as a series of acclaimed animated shorts for comedians Jerry Seinfeld, Louis C.K., Wyatt Cenac, Kyle Kinane and many others.

His latest projects for 6PH include Cosmos: A Spacetime Odyssey on FOX, the Nickelodeon short Bear Wrestler, and directing animation on a series of 2-D shorts based on Sony Pictures' Cloudy with a Chance of Meatballs 2. Most recently Franklin directed the animated version of the fan-favorite and cult classic graphic novel Prison Pit, written by Johnny Ryan and published by Fantagraphics. The uncensored, ultra-violent series is well received among comic book insiders and fans alike, acclaimed for its creative allegiance to the original black and white comic book.
