= James Arnold Taylor =

American voice actor (born 1969)

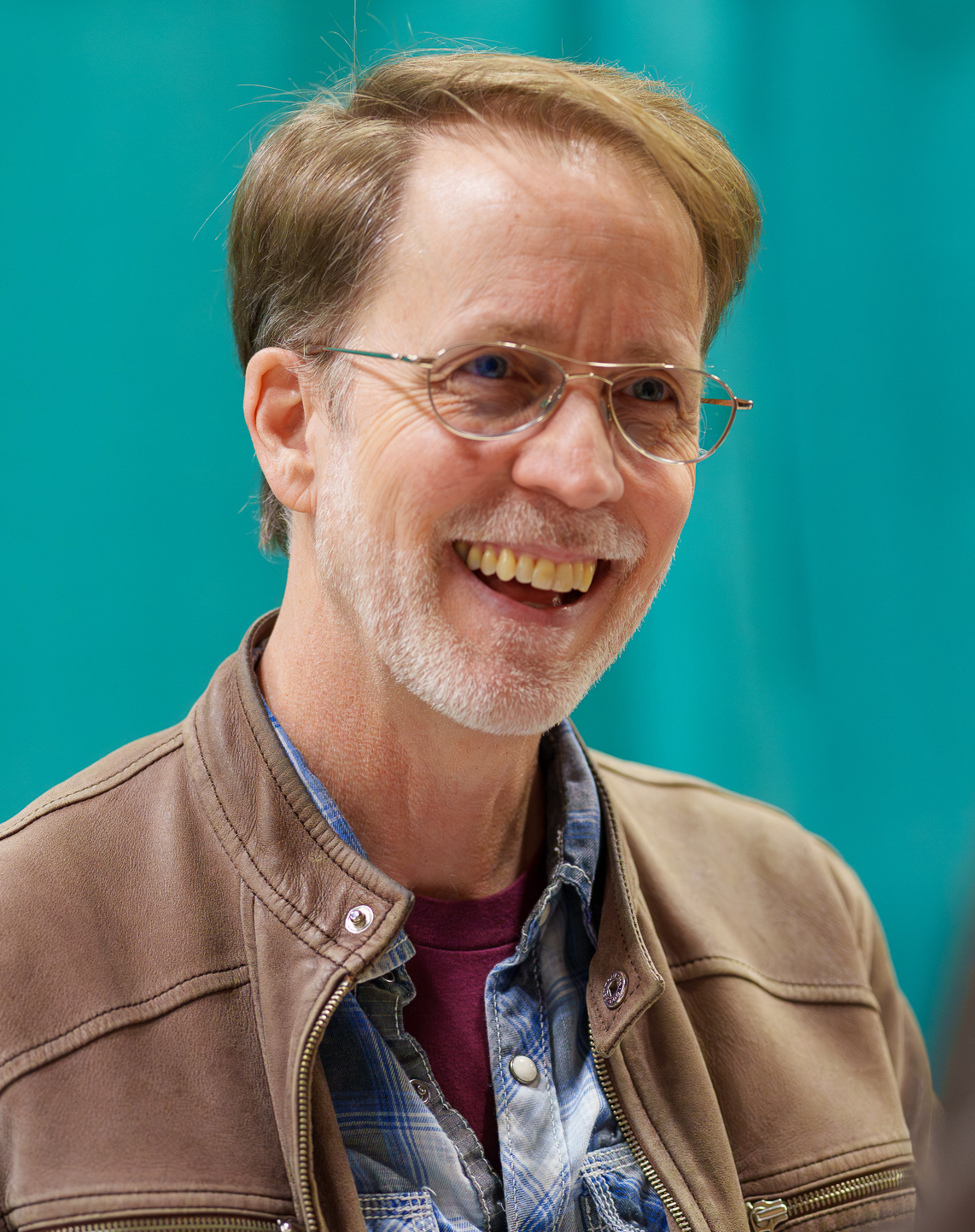
- Taylor in 2025
- Born: July 22, 1969 (age 57); Santa Barbara, California, U.S.
- Other name: JAT
- Occupations: Voice actor; podcaster
- Years active: 1980s–present
- Spouse: Allison Taylor (m. 1991)
- Children: 1
- Website: www.jamesarnoldtaylor.com

James Arnold Taylor (born July 22, 1969), also known by his initials JAT, is an American voice actor and podcaster. He is known for voicing Ratchet in the Ratchet & Clank franchise, Fred Flintstone in various commercials, Tidus in the Final Fantasy X series, Shuyin in Final Fantasy X-2, Obi-Wan Kenobi in various Star Wars media beginning with Star Wars: Clone Wars, Wooldoor Sockbat in Drawn Together (2004–2007), and the titular character in the animated series Johnny Test (2005–2014) and its revival (2021–2022).

== Early life and career ==
Taylor grew up in Santa Barbara, California. He dropped out of high school. Taylor started performing stand up comedy at the age of 16. He later became a radio DJ and comedy writer for various radio personalities such as Jonathon Brandmeier, Mancow, Rick Dees and Howard Stern. Taylor eventually became a production director where he was focused on radio commercials. He worked at Premiere Radio Networks. He decided to become a voice actor after doing a radio commercial with voice actor Don Messick. Taylor decided to use his full name to distinguish himself from singer James Taylor due to Screen Actors Guild guidelines.

== Voice acting career ==
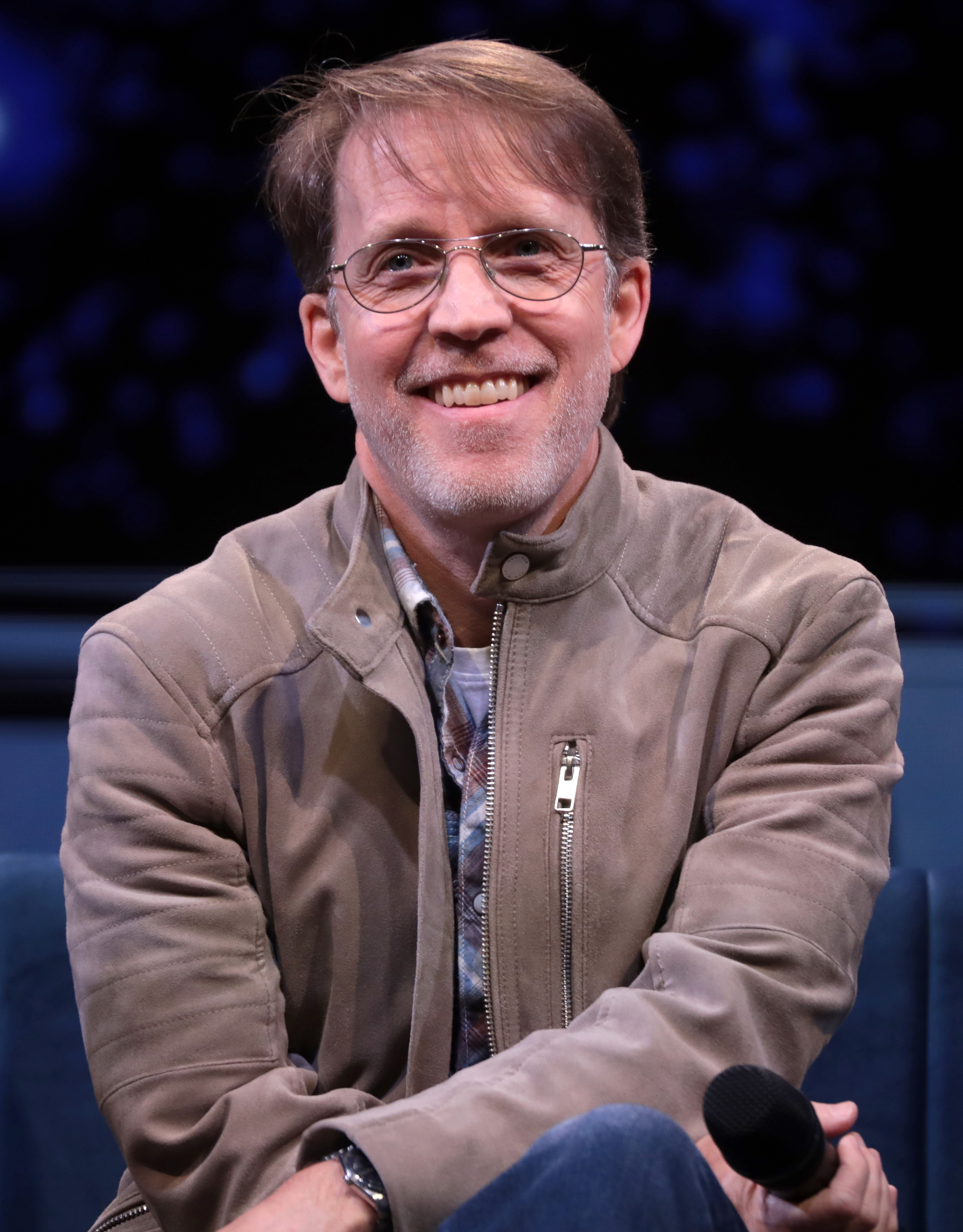
Taylor at the 2023 Phoenix Fan Fusion.

Taylor began his animation voice acting career in the 1990s, appearing in numerous roles including Ratchet in the Ratchet & Clank video game series and Tidus from Final Fantasy X. From 2005 until 2011, Taylor voiced Fred Flintstone in commercials and promotional material following the death of Fred Flintstone's previous voice actor, Henry Corden in 2005. He was also the voice of the titular character on Johnny Test. Taylor is currently the announcer for Fox’s Animation Domination.

In 2013, Taylor published the book JAT 365: 365 Inspirations for the Pursuit of Your Dreams. In 2018, he began the podcast Talking to Myself.

== Personal life ==
Taylor is married. As of 2017, his wife Allison is also his manager. Together they have a daughter, Lydia, who was adopted from China. He starred in Animal Crackers alongside his daughter.

Taylor is a devout Christian and has discussed his faith on several occasions.

He contracted a black mold infection in 2005 which nearly caused him to lose his voice and took almost a year to recover.

== Filmography ==
=== Voice-over roles ===
==== Film ====
List of voice performances in feature films
| Year | Title | Role | Notes | Source |
|---|---|---|---|---|
| 2007 | TMNT | Leonardo | | |
| 2008 | Star Wars: The Clone Wars | Obi-Wan Kenobi, 4-A7, Medical Droid | | |
| 2012 | Foodfight! | Doctor Si Nustrix | Limited theatrical release | |
| 2015 | Star Wars: The Force Awakens | Obi-Wan Kenobi | Lines redubbed by Ewan McGregor | |
| 2016 | Ratchet & Clank | Ratchet | | |
| 2017 | Animal Crackers | Buffalo Bob | Limited theatrical release | |
| 2018 | Teen Titans Go! To the Movies | Fake Slade Actor | Character is identified as Shia LaBeouf within the film | |
| 2025 | The King of Kings | Matthew, Phillip, Thomas | | |

List of voice performances in direct-to-video and television films
| Year | Title | Role | Notes | Source |
|---|---|---|---|---|
| 2003 | Atlantis: Milo's Return | Milo Thatch | | |
| 2003 | The Animatrix | Ash, Raul | | |
| 2007 | Superman: Doomsday | Officer Tucker | | |
| 2008 | Justice League: The New Frontier | Captain Cold | | |
| 2008 | The Goldilocks and the 3 Bears Show | Cricket, Weasel, Pig Classmate | | |
| 2009 | Bionicle: The Legend Reborn | Berix, Vastus | | |
| 2010 | The Drawn Together Movie: The Movie! | Wooldoor Sockbat, Jew Producer | | |
| 2010 | Gnomes and Trolls: The Secret Chamber | Slim, Prickles, Hilda, Spike | | |
| 2011 | Green Lantern: Emerald Knights | Tomar-Re | | |
| 2011 | Batman: The Dark Knight Returns | Mr. Hudson | | |
| 2015 | Lego DC Comics Super Heroes: Justice League vs. Bizarro League | Barry Allen / Flash, DeSaad | | |
| 2015 | Lego DC Comics Super Heroes: Justice League: Attack of the Legion of Doom | Barry Allen / Flash, Sam Lane | | |
| 2016 | Lego DC Comics Super Heroes: Justice League – Cosmic Clash | Barry Allen / Flash | | |
| 2016 | Lego Scooby-Doo! Haunted Hollywood | Chet Brickton, Narrator | | |
| 2018 | Lego DC Comics Super Heroes: The Flash | Barry Allen / Flash | | |
| 2020 | Lego DC Shazam! Magic and Monsters | Barry Allen / Flash, Dummy | | |
| 2023 | Scooby-Doo! and Krypto, Too! | Jimmy Olsen, Rex Ruthor | | |
| 2025 | The Greatest Thing Ever: A Garden Cartoon Movie | Lenny the Lion | | |
| 2025 | The Christmas King!: A Garden Cartoon Movie | Lenny the Lion | | |

==== Animation ====
List of voice performances in animation
| Year | Series | Role | Notes | Source |
|---|---|---|---|---|
| 1997 | Johnny Bravo | Various voices | | |
| 2003–2007 | Codename: Kids Next Door | Various voices | 10 episodes | |
| 2003 | Whatever Happened to... Robot Jones? | Various voices | 2 episodes | |
| 2003 | Teen Titans | Overload | Episode: "Car Trouble" | |
| 2003–2004 | The Powerpuff Girls | Various voices | 5 episodes | |
| 2003–2005 | Star Wars: Clone Wars | Obi-Wan Kenobi, additional voices | | |
| 2004 | Static Shock | Eddie Felson/Speedwarp | Episode: "Now You See Him..." | |
| 2004 | The Fairly OddParents | Sprig Speevak / Crash Nebula | Episode: "Crash Nebula" | |
| 2004 | Justice League Unlimited | Kaznian Private | Episode: "Hawk and Dove" | |
| 2004 | Game Over | Various characters | | |
| 2004–2007 | Danny Phantom | Walker, Monster, Ghost Cops | | |
| 2004–2007 | Drawn Together | Wooldoor Sockbat, Jew Producer, various characters | | |
| 2005 | My Life as a Teenage Robot | Kenny/Y-K9, Oblivious Guy, Customer | Episode: "Love 'Em or Leash 'Em" | |
| 2005 | Duck Dodgers | Rogue's Assistant, Lifomatica | 2 episodes | |
| 2005 | Stroker and Hoop | Ron Howard, Answering Machine Guy | 2 episodes | |
| 2005–2014 | Johnny Test | Johnny Test, various voices | | |
| 2005–2007 | A.T.O.M. | Axel Manning, Sebastian Manning, TIllian | 52 episodes | |
| 2006 | The Grim Adventures of Billy & Mandy | Fred Flintstone | Episode: "Modern Primitives" | |
| 2006–2007 | Legion of Super Heroes | Mekt Ranzz / Lightning Lord | 3 episodes | |
| 2007 | Loonatics Unleashed | Bugsy the Bug, Male Reporter (3) | Episode: "In the Pinkster" | |
| 2007 | Afro Samurai | Yashichi | Episode: "The Dream Reader" | |
| 2008–2009 | The Spectacular Spider-Man | Harry Osborn, Frederick Foswell / Patch, Homonculi, Alan O'Neil | | |
| 2008 | Ben 10: Alien Force | Raff | Episode: "X = Ben + 2" | |
| 2008–2011 | Batman: The Brave and the Bold | Green Arrow, Blue Bowman, Guy Gardner, Major Disaster, Wotan, Nabu, Jace, Arges | | |
| 2008–2014, 2020 | Star Wars: The Clone Wars | Obi-Wan Kenobi, Plo Koon, Rako Hardeen, others | | |
| 2010 | G.I. Joe: Renegades | Sheriff Terry, Matty, Russel Clemens | | |
| 2011 | Generator Rex | Trig Student, Video Kid | Episode: "Without a Paddle" | |
| 2011 | ThunderCats | Old Emrick, Khamai | Episode: "Song of the Petalars" | |
| 2011 | T.U.F.F. Puppy | Biff, Citizen | Episode: "Dog Save the Queen" | |
| 2011–2013, 2019–2022 | Young Justice | Barry Allen / Flash, Hawkman, Topo, G. Gordon Godfrey, Neutron, King Shark, additional voices | | |
| 2012 | Kaijudo: Rise of the Duel Masters | King Tritonus | | |
| 2012 | Randy Cunningham: Ninth Grade Ninja | Randy Cunningham | First few episodes only, lines redubbed by Ben Schwartz | |
| 2012–2020 | Doc McStuffins | Boppy | 5 episodes | |
| 2013 | Teen Titans Go! | Hadji, Benton Quest, Race Bannon | Episode: "La Larva de Amor" | |
| 2013 | Beware the Batman | William Benjamin | Episode: "Control" | |
| 2013–2015 | Hulk and the Agents of S.M.A.S.H. | Leader, Blastaar, Triton, Human Torch, Moon-Boy, Junior, additional voices | | |
| 2014 | Star Wars Rebels | Obi-Wan Kenobi | Episode: "Spark of Rebellion" | |
| 2014 | Lego DC Comics: Batman Be-Leaguered | Barry Allen / Flash | | |
| 2014 | We Wish You a Merry Walrus | Roofhowse | | |
| 2015 | Penn Zero: Part-Time Hero | Additional voices | | |
| 2015–2017 | Ultimate Spider-Man | Triton, Molten Man, Blastaar, Leader, Hydro-Man, additional voices | | |
| 2015–2019 | Guardians of the Galaxy | Cosmo the Spacedog, Yondu, additional voices | | |
| 2016 | Turbo Fast | Ant Leader, Grasshopper | Episode: "The Ants and the Grasshoppers" | |
| 2016 | SpongeBob SquarePants | Nick Fishkins | Episode: "Sold!" | |
| 2016–2018 | DreamWorks Dragons | Throk, Trader Zachariah, various voices | | |
| 2016–2017 | Avengers Assemble | Leader, additional voices | 3 episodes | |
| 2016–2017 | Transformers: Robots in Disguise | Boostwing, Crazybolt, Arnold, Teenage Boy | 3 episodes | |
| 2017 | Be Cool, Scooby-Doo! | Mort, Teenage Boy | Episode: "El Bandito" | |
| 2017 | Billy Dilley's Super-Duper Subterranean Summer | Count Wretcher, Maria | | |
| 2017 | LEGO Marvel Super Heroes – Guardians of the Galaxy: The Thanos Threat | Yondu | Television film | |
| 2017–present | The Loud House | Various voices | | |
| 2017–2018 | Stretch Armstrong and the Flex Fighters | Circuit-Stream, Controller, Security Guard | 2 episodes | |
| 2019–2022 | Lego City Adventures | Tippy Dorman | | |
| 2019 | Victor and Valentino | Chip | Episode: "The Collector" | |
| 2020 | The Casagrandes | Pierre, Little Burger | Episode: "Fast Feud" | |
| 2020 | Jurassic World Camp Cretaceous | Eddie | Episode: "Happy Birthday, Eddie!" | |
| 2020 | The Lego Star Wars Holiday Special | Obi-Wan Kenobi, Ben Kenobi | | |
| 2021 | Lego Star Wars: Terrifying Tales | Ben Kenobi, Cozler | | |
| 2021 | Looney Tunes Cartoons | Russian Dog | | |
| 2021–2022 | Johnny Test | Johnny Test, various voices | | |
| 2022 | Lego Star Wars: Summer Vacation | Obi-Wan Kenobi, Jawa | | |
| 2022 | Batwheels | Toyman | 2 episodes | |
| 2022 | Tales of the Jedi | Obi-Wan Kenobi | | |
| 2024 | Mr. Birchum | Brad | 4 episodes | |
| 2024 | Batman: Caped Crusader | Marcus Driver, Client | 3 episodes | |
| 2025 | Gabriel and the Guardians | Malachros | | |

==== Anime ====
List of dubbing performances in anime
| Year | Series | Role | Notes | Source |
|---|---|---|---|---|
| 2005 | Nausicaä of the Valley of the Wind | Muzu | | |

==== Video games ====
List of voice performances in video games
| Year | Title | Role | Notes | Source |
|---|---|---|---|---|
| 2001 | Final Fantasy X | Tidus | | |
| 2002 | The Lord of the Rings: The Fellowship of the Ring | Pippin Took | | |
| 2003 | Crimson Skies: High Road to Revenge | Sheriff, DeCarlo, Cajun, Red Skull | | |
| 2003 | Ratchet & Clank: Going Commando | Ratchet, additional voices | | |
| 2003 | Final Fantasy X-2 | Tidus, Shuyin | | |
| 2004 | Scooby-Doo! Mystery Mayhem | Jeremy Rhodes, additional voices | | |
| 2004 | Shrek 2 | Gingerbread Man, Prince Charming, additional voices | | |
| 2004 | Spider-Man 2 | Quentin Beck / Mysterio | | |
| 2004 | Tales of Symphonia | Lord Yggdrasill, Gnome | | |
| 2004 | Ratchet & Clank: Up Your Arsenal | Ratchet, Maxmillian, additional voices | | |
| 2004 | Vampire: The Masquerade – Bloodlines | Vandal, Julius, Killer | | |
| 2005 | Star Wars: Episode III – Revenge of the Sith | Obi-Wan Kenobi | | |
| 2005 | Charlie and the Chocolate Factory | Willy Wonka | | |
| 2005 | X-Men Legends II: Rise of Apocalypse | Iceman, Sugar Man | | |
| 2005 | Jak X: Combat Racing | Ratchet | | |
| 2005 | Shrek SuperSlam | Humpty Dumpty, Prince Charming | | |
| 2005 | Ratchet: Deadlocked | Ratchet, Announcer | | |
| 2005 | Nicktoons Unite! | Walker, Male Fairy, Doomsday Trooper | | |
| 2005 | Star Wars: Battlefront II | Obi-Wan Kenobi | | |
| 2005 | Neopets: The Darkest Faerie | King Altador | | |
| 2006 | Kingdom Hearts II | Jack Sparrow | | |
| 2006 | Shrek Smash n' Crash Racing | Gingerbread Man, Prince Charming, Humpty Dumpty | | |
| 2006 | X-Men: The Official Game | Cyclops | | |
| 2006 | Pirates of the Caribbean: The Legend of Jack Sparrow | Marty, additional voices | | |
| 2006 | Marvel: Ultimate Alliance | Iceman | | |
| 2006 | Spider-Man: Battle for New York | Spider-Man | | |
| 2007 | Ratchet & Clank: Size Matters | Ratchet | | |
| 2007 | TMNT | Leonardo | | |
| 2007 | Shrek the Third | Artie, Prince Charming, Gnome | | |
| 2007 | Hot Shots Tennis | Kent | | |
| 2007 | Spider-Man: Friend or Foe | Peter Parker / Spider-Man | | |
| 2007 | Shrek: Ogres & Dronkeys | Dwarf | | |
| 2007 | Ratchet & Clank Future: Tools of Destruction | Ratchet | | |
| 2008 | Secret Agent Clank | Ratchet | | |
| 2008 | Ratchet & Clank Future: Quest for Booty | Ratchet | | |
| 2008 | Lego Batman: The Videogame | Robin, Nightwing | | |
| 2008 | Star Wars: The Clone Wars – Lightsaber Duels | Obi-Wan Kenobi, Plo Koon | | |
| 2009 | Cartoon Network Universe: FusionFall | Eddy, Johnny Test | | |
| 2009 | Free Realms | Chatty | | |
| 2009 | Transformers: Revenge of the Fallen | The Fallen | | |
| 2009 | Ice Age: Dawn of the Dinosaurs | Crash | | |
| 2009 | Dissidia Final Fantasy | Tidus | | |
| 2009 | Star Wars Battlefront: Elite Squadron | Obi-Wan Kenobi, Ferroda | | |
| 2009 | Star Wars: The Clone Wars – Republic Heroes | Obi-Wan Kenobi, Plo Koon | | |
| 2009 | Speed Racer: The Videogame | Jack "Cannonball" Taylor, Colonel Colon | | |
| 2009 | Ratchet & Clank Future: A Crack in Time | Ratchet | | |
| 2010 | Final Fantasy XIII | Cocoon Inhabitants | | |
| 2010 | How to Train Your Dragon | Fishlegs Ingerman | | |
| 2010 | Despicable Me: The Game | Minions | | |
| 2010 | Monkey Island 2 Special Edition: LeChuck's Revenge | Largo LeGrande, Mad Marty, Fisherman, Spitting Contest Referee | | |
| 2010 | Valkyria Chronicles II | Shop Clerk | | |
| 2010 | Back to the Future: The Game | Young Emmett "Doc" Brown | | |
| 2011 | Dissidia 012 Final Fantasy | Tidus | | |
| 2011 | Lego Star Wars III: The Clone Wars | Obi-Wan Kenobi, Plo Koon, Nuvo Vindi | | |
| 2011 | PlayStation Move Heroes | Ratchet | | |
| 2011 | Ratchet & Clank: All 4 One | Ratchet | | |
| 2011 | Super Star Kartz | Hiccup | | |
| 2012 | Kinect Star Wars | Obi-Wan Kenobi | | |
| 2012 | Ice Age: Continental Drift – Arctic Games | Squint | | |
| 2012 | Marvel Avengers: Battle for Earth | Spider-Man, Thor, Magneto | | |
| 2012 | PlayStation All-Stars Battle Royale | Ratchet | | |
| 2012 | Ratchet & Clank: Full Frontal Assault | Ratchet | | |
| 2013 | Ratchet & Clank: Into the Nexus | Ratchet | | |
| 2012, 2014 | Ratchet & Clank Collection | Ratchet | Going Commando and Up Your Arsenal | |
| 2013 | Marvel Heroes | Magneto, Iceman | | |
| 2013 | Lego Marvel Super Heroes | Professor X, Silver Surfer, Spider-Man, Superior Spider-Man, Winter Soldier, Ant-Man | | |
| 2014 | How to Train Your Dragon: School of Dragons | Hiccup, Fishlegs Ingerman | | |
| 2014 | Skylanders: Trap Team | Various characters | Grouped under Voice Actors | |
| 2014 | Kingdom Hearts HD 2.5 Remix | Captain Jack Sparrow, The Prince | Archive audio | |
| 2015 | Infinite Crisis | Nightmare Robin | | |
| 2015 | Disney Infinity 3.0 | Obi-Wan Kenobi, Plo Koon, TD-54 | | |
| 2015 | Transformers: Devastation | Menasor, Seeker 1 | | |
| 2016 | Ratchet & Clank | Ratchet | | |
| 2016 | Final Fantasy Explorers | Tidus | | |
| 2016 | World of Final Fantasy | Tidus | | |
| 2018 | Dissidia Final Fantasy NT | Tidus | | |
| 2018 | Super Bomberman R | Ratchet | PlayStation 4 version | |
| 2018 | Marvel Powers United VR | Iceman, Magneto | | |
| 2018 | Mobius Final Fantasy | Tidus | | |
| 2018 | Lego DC Super-Villains | Green Arrow | | |
| 2018 | Star Wars Battlefront II | Obi-Wan Kenobi | Downloadable content | |
| 2019 | Marvel Ultimate Alliance 3: The Black Order | Cosmo, Iceman | | |
| 2019 | Star Wars Jedi: Fallen Order | Obi-Wan Kenobi | Reused voice lines from Star Wars Rebels | |
| 2020 | Star Wars: Squadrons | Feresk Tssat | | |
| 2021 | Ratchet & Clank: Rift Apart | Ratchet | | |
| 2022 | Lego Star Wars: The Skywalker Saga | Obi-Wan Kenobi | | |
| 2023 | DreamWorks All-Star Kart Racing | Hiccup, King Gristle | | |
| 2023 | Disney Speedstorm | Kuzco | | |
| 2024 | Marvel Rivals | Magneto / Erik Lehnsherr | | |
| 2026 | Marvel Tokon: Fighting Souls | Magneto / Erik Lehnsherr | English dub | |

=== Live action roles ===
List of acting performances and appearances in television and film
| Year | Title | Role | Notes | Source |
|---|---|---|---|---|
| 2001 | The Comedy Team of Pete & James | Himself | Documentary; also writer and producer | |
| 2008 | X-treme Weekend | —N/a | Executive producer | |
| 2008 | The Audition | —N/a | Associate producer | |
| 2010 | Big Time Rush | Regional Manager Taylor | Episode: 'Big Time Demos' | |
| 2013 | I Know That Voice | Himself | Documentary | |
| 2015 | Summer '78 | —N/a | Producer | |
| 2015 | A Certain Point of View | —N/a | Producer (3 episodes) | |
| 2017 | Clone Wars Conversations | Himself/host | Also writer and producer | |
| 2019 | Kenobi: A Star Wars Fan Film | Captain Leegus | Fan film | |
| 2020 | The Last Blockbuster | Himself | Documentary | |

=== Web ===
List of appearances in web series
| Year | Title | Role | Notes | Source |
|---|---|---|---|---|
| 2018–present | James Arnold Taylor's Talking to Myself | Himself/host | Also writer and producer | |
| 2023–present | The Garden | Lenny the Lion, additional voices | | |
