= The Drawn Together Movie: The Movie! =

2010 American animated direct-to-video film

- DVD cover
- Directed by: Greg Franklin
- Written by: Dave Jeser; Matt Silverstein
- Based on: Drawn Together by: Dave Jeser; Matt Silverstein
- Produced by: Richard Quan
- Starring: Adam Carolla; Abbey DiGregorio; Jess Harnell; Seth MacFarlane; Jack Plotnick; Tara Strong; Cree Summer; James Arnold Taylor; Vernon Wells
- Edited by: Tony Christopherson
- Music by: Eban Schletter
- Production companies: Comedy Central Films; Double Hemm; 6 Point Harness
- Distributed by: Paramount Home Entertainment
- Release dates: March 18, 2010 (South by Southwest); April 20, 2010 (United States)
- Running time: 71 minutes
- Country: United States
- Language: English
- Budget: $1 million

The Drawn Together Movie: The Movie! (also known as The Drawn Together Movie or Drawn Together: The Movie) is a 2010 American adult animated parody musical black comedy film. It is based on the Comedy Central animated sitcom Drawn Together, written and executive produced by creators Dave Jeser and Matt Silverstein, produced by Richard Quan, and directed by Greg Franklin. The film is the first Drawn Together release since the TV show's cancellation, and the film itself deals with the subject. It is the second animated film from Comedy Central, after South Park: Bigger, Longer & Uncut.

The original cast returned to voice their characters and features the guest voice of Seth MacFarlane as "I.S.R.A.E.L." (Intelligent Smart Robot Animation Eraser Lady), and Vernon Wells as the villainous Network Head. While the television series was produced and animated by Rough Draft Studios using digital ink and paint, the film was instead produced and animated by 6 Point Harness and done entirely in Flash animation using Toon Boom and Adobe Flash Professional due to budget cuts.

The film received a generally negative reception.

== Plot ==
Foxxy Love discovers she can swear without being censored, and calls the network to find out why the TV show Drawn Together has been canceled due to The Suck My Taint Show (a parody of South Park). The Network Head, who has long harbored a hatred of the series, learns that the Drawn Together housemates are still alive – their survival having been concealed from him by the Jew Producer – and furiously summons I.S.R.A.E.L. (Intelligent Smart Robot Animation Eraser Lady), a robot designed to erase cartoon characters. As the Jew Producer attempts to warn the housemates, I.S.R.A.E.L. arrives and erases the Drawn Together house; the housemates escape in Foxxy's van, while I.S.R.A.E.L. takes the Jew Producer captive and brings him to the Network Head.

The housemates learn that they are not originals but are parodies created specifically for the show. Foxxy insists that their survival lies in getting their TV show back on air. Princess Clara refuses to believe she is not a real princess and claims her father can protect them. Captain Hero, Xandir and Ling-Ling go with Clara, while Spanky Ham and Wooldoor Sockbat go with Foxxy. While they argue, Toot Braunstein steals Foxxy's van and drives away.

Clara, Hero, Molly (a corpse Hero believes to be his girlfriend), Xandir and Ling-Ling arrive at Clara's kingdom, expecting refuge. Clara encounters the king, who is not her father, having only been hired to portray the role. The group are thrown in the dungeons for impersonating royalty, and the guards dismember and kill Clara. The other three hijack a carriage and escape.

Foxxy, Spanky and Wooldoor visit the Suck My Taint Girl, who it transpires is a fan of the Drawn Together show. She says they were canceled because vulgar and offensive content is only acceptable when it "makes a point", and they can "get a point" by visiting Make-A-Point Land. Foxxy, Spanky and Wooldoor reunite with Hero, Xandir, Ling-Ling and Molly when their carriage – following an attack by I.S.R.A.E.L. – collides with the trio. They and their carriage fall into a river. They escape drowning when the director's commentary informs them that Ling-Ling can inflate into a life raft when his tail is pulled.

After Foxxy retrieves a drunk, heavily pregnant Toot from Bedrock, the housemates travel to Make-A-Point Land with the Suck My Taint Girl. The land's resident wizard gives the group a box, saying it contains a point. Spanky persuades most of the housemates to reject the point in favor of continuing with vulgar and offensive behavior for their own pleasure, but Wooldoor – still desperate to get back on the air – opens the box whereupon the eraser bomb inside explodes, killing him. The Network Head, I.S.R.A.E.L. and the Jew Producer show up to erase the remaining cast. The Suck My Taint Girl reveals that she is the Network Head's wife and that she alerted him to the group's whereabouts.

The Jew Producer convinces I.S.R.A.E.L. to spare the housemates, motivating I.S.R.A.E.L. to impale the Network Head on a spike. The dying Network Head subsequently reveals he has enough eraser bombs strapped to his waist to erase all of Make-A-Point Land. The Jew Producer and Suck My Taint Girl struggle for the detonator and drop it, killing them and erasing Make-A-Point Land and everyone in it. However, the housemates escape with the help of the Giant Who Shits into His Own Mouth (a parody of a South Park metaphor for political bipartisanship).

The Giant and surviving housemates visit the remains of the Drawn Together house. The Jew Producer's son takes over and tells them that he might be able to give them a direct-to-DVD movie. I.S.R.A.E.L. arrives, and she and the giant are smitten with each other. Everyone laughs until Spanky steps on an unexploded eraser bomb, erasing the group and ending the series.

== Cast ==
Voice actor	Main role	Parody of	Other roles
Jess Harnell	Captain Hero	Superman and various superheroes	Wile E. Coyote, Rhinoceros Guard 1 (Ryan), The King, Bedrock Bartender
Cree Summer	Foxxy Love, Suck-My-Taint Girl	Valerie Brown, South Park characters	The Network Head's Wife, Old Lady
James Arnold Taylor	Wooldoor Sockbat	SpongeBob SquarePants / Stimpy	The Jew Producer, Road Runner, Barney Rubble, Eddie, Brainy and Hefty Smurf, the Make-a-Point Wizard, "Suck-My-Taint Show" Audience Members
Adam Corolla	Spanky Ham	Internet Flash cartoons / Porky Pig	-
Tara Strong	Princess Clara, Toot	Princess Ariel / Betty Boop and silent-era cartoons	Sasha, Jew Producer's Wife, the Red-Haired Princess, Betty Rubble, Bedrock Blonde
Abbey DiGregorio	Ling-Ling	Pikachu / Anime	-
Jack Plotnick	Xandir P. Wifflebottom	Link and other video game protagonists	-
Seth MacFarlane	I.S.R.A.E.L.	The State of Israel	-
Vernon Wells	The Network Head	-	-

Dave Jeser, Matt Silverstein, and Kaitlyn Robrock appear in the film uncredited as the Giant Who Shits into His Own Mouth / Rhino Guard 2, the Jew Producer's Son, and Smurfette respectively.

== Production ==
In an interview with Animation World Network, the series creators, Dave Jeser and Matt Silverstein, expressed dissatisfaction with ending Drawn Together's original run on a clip show. The duo approached the film with the intention of creating a more "dynamic" conclusion to the series. Silverstein and Jeser also intended for the film's content to be more tame compared to the series, which Jeser commented that they "failed miserably on that".

=== Animation ===
While the series was animated by Rough Draft Studios in South Korea and Glendale, California using digital ink and paint, the movie was animated by 6 Point Harness in Los Angeles, California using Flash animation and Toon Boom. This was because the movie had to be done under half the cost of the series. While the movie had a new crew of animators and artists, the director of the film, Greg Franklin, had actually worked on the original pilot for Drawn Together, which was originally done in Flash.

When the series was animated by Rough Draft, the creators, Dave Jeser and Matt Silverstein, weren't that much involved with the animation process. In the movie however, the creators were more involved, even as far as to tweak-out jokes. The animation in the film also proved to be quicker than the show.

== Release ==
Though originally announced for a November 2009 release, the film's release date was pushed to March 23, 2010, then released on April 20, 2010. The film premiered at the 2010 SXSW festival in Austin, Texas, on March 18, 2010.

The film was released on April 20, 2010, on DVD, and on Blu-ray exclusively at Best Buy. The film was released on DVD in Australia later that year on October 6, 2010.

== Reception ==
The film received negative reviews from critics. Common Sense Media panned the movie and gave it one star, criticizing its vulgarity, stating that the film is "filled to the brim with lewd sexual acts, language, and violence. The cartoon parody is meant to push the boundaries of taste, but amidst violence against women, the violation of corpses, kids asking to be sexually abused, heads blown off at close range, the drinking of baby blood ... who -- and especially what child -- is going to be thinking of this as a parody?"

IGN also gave the movie a critical review, writing that a "great comedic opportunity was wasted on cheap one-dimensional gags and boring sex jokes."

In contrast, DVD Verdict was more favorable, commenting that the movie was "first and foremost a goodbye gift to fans of the series and they should have no problem enjoying the myriad references and in-jokes scattered about, as well as all of the crude humor."

== Controversy ==
The film was criticized for its supposed antisemitism, even though the producers said that "it was supposed to make fun of bigotry". Dave Jeser and Matt Silverstein, who created the show and wrote the movie, are both Jewish.
