= Matt Silverstein =

American screenwriter

- Born: Matthew Richard Silverstein; April 1, 1972 (age 53); Oradell, New Jersey, U.S.
- Occupation: Television writer
- Years active: 1994–present
- Known for: Co-creator of Drawn Together, producer and co-developer of Golan the Insatiable

Matthew Richard "Matt" Silverstein (born April 1, 1972) is an American television writer and co-creator with Dave Jeser of the Comedy Central adult animated sitcom Drawn Together. He has also written for other television shows including 3rd Rock from the Sun, The Man Show, Action, Greg the Bunny, 3-South, Axe Cop, The Goode Family and The Cleveland Show, and also created the MTV animated comedy DJ & the Fro in 2009. He cowrote the script to the film Accidental Love.

== Biography ==
Silverstein was raised in a Jewish family in Oradell, New Jersey. Silverstein graduated from the Dwight-Englewood School in Englewood, New Jersey which he attended with Jeser. In 2015, Silverstein, along with Dave Jeser, developed author Joshua Miller's Golan the Insatiable for television appearing on Fox Television in May 2015. Producers were Jeser, Silverstein, Hend Baghdady and Nick Weidenfeld.

== Filmography ==
=== Film ===
Year	Title	Role	Notes
2010	The Drawn Together Movie: The Movie!	Producer's son	Executive producer, writer
2015	Accidental Love		Screenwriter
