= Dave Jeser =

American TV writer

- Born: David Mark Douglas Jeser; September 25, 1977 (age 48); New Milford, New Jersey, U.S.
- Occupation: Television writer
- Years active: 1998–present
- Known for: Co-creator of Drawn Together, producer and co-developer of Golan the Insatiable, executive producer and creator of "The Prank Panel"

David Mark Douglas Jeser (born September 25, 1977) is an American television writer and co-creator with Matt Silverstein of the Comedy Central adult animated sitcom Drawn Together. He has also written for other television shows including 3rd Rock from the Sun, The Man Show, Action, Greg the Bunny, 3-South, Axe Cop, The Goode Family, The Cleveland Show and Life in Pieces, and also ran "Crank Yankers", created Golan the Insatiable, the MTV animated comedy DJ & the Fro in 2009 and Johnny Knoxville's The Prank Panel for ABC.

== Biography ==
Jeser was raised in a Jewish family in New Milford, New Jersey. His parents were ardent Zionists. Jeser is a graduate of Solomon Schechter Day School of Bergen County in New Milford and the Dwight-Englewood School in Englewood, New Jersey where he met Silverstein. In 2015, Jeser, along with Matt Silverstein, developed author Joshua Miller's Golan the Insatiable for television appearing on Fox Television in May 2015. Producers were Jeser, Silverstein and Hend Baghdady.

== Filmography ==
=== Film ===
Year	Title	Role	Notes
2010	The Drawn Together Movie: The Movie!	The Giant Who Shits Into His Own Mouth / Rhino Guard 2	Executive producer, writer
2013	Coffin Dodgers		Co-creator, writer, producer; failed pilot
2015	Accidental Love		Screenwriter
