= 1977 in animation =

Events in 1977 in animation.

== Events ==
=== February ===
- February 9: Ralph Bakshi's Wizards is first released. It will later become a cult classic.

=== March ===
- March 11: The Many Adventures of Winnie the Pooh, produced by the Walt Disney Company, is first released.
- March 29: 49th Academy Awards: Leisure by Suzanne Baker wins the Academy Award for Best Animated Short.

=== April ===
- April 1: Richard Williams' debut film Raggedy Ann & Andy: A Musical Adventure premieres. Due to going well-over the budget near completion, Williams was withdrawn from the project as 20th Century-Fox took control over it. The reviews were mixed.
- April 20: Woody Allen's live-action comedy film Annie Hall premieres which has an animated segment directed by former Disney animator Chris Ishii.

=== June ===
- June 22: The Walt Disney Company releases The Rescuers, directed by Wolfgang Reitherman, John Lounsbery and Art Stevens.

=== August ===
- August 24: The Peanuts film, Race for Your Life, Charlie Brown, premieres in theaters.
- August 26: The first episode of the Hungarian animated TV series A kockásfülű nyúl is broadcast.

=== September ===
- September 10:
  - Hanna-Barbera first broadcasts Captain Caveman and the Teen Angels
  - A celebrity animated TV show I Am the Greatest: The Adventures of Muhammad Ali, voiced by the boxing legend himself, is first broadcast, produced by Farmhouse Films. However, it will only run one season.

=== October ===
- October 24: The Peanuts TV special, It's Your First Kiss, Charlie Brown, premieres on CBS. It was deemed infamous for the revealed appearance of the Little Red-Haired Girl, who was attended to be unseen at the time, and the result of Peppermint Patty blaming and insulting Charlie Brown, which were subsequently made lower and backmasked following the protest. This was also the first Peanuts special to not be composed by Vince Guaraldi (due to his passing from last year), instead being Ed Bogas.
- October 28: The Dr. Seuss special Halloween Is Grinch Night airs, marking the second animated appearance of The Grinch.

=== Specific date unknown ===
- Magic Bus is founded.
- Ruby-Spears is founded.
- Robert Grossman, James Picker and Craig Whitaker's Jimmy the C is first released, a clay animation film starring U.S. President Jimmy Carter singing Georgia On My Mind.

== Films released ==
- February 4 - The Lighthouse Island (East Germany)
- February 9 - Wizards (United States)
- March 1 - Krabat - The Sorcerer's Apprentice (Czechoslovakia and West Germany)
- March 11 - The Many Adventures of Winnie the Pooh (United States)
- March 19 - The Wild Swans (Japan)
- April 1 - Raggedy Ann & Andy: A Musical Adventure (United Kingdom and United States)
- April 6 - The Easter Bunny Is Comin' To Town (United States)
- April 7:
  - Bugs Bunny's Easter Special (United States)
  - Mattie the Goose-boy (Hungary)
- May 6 - Gulliver's Travels (United Kingdom and Belgium)
- May 18 - Love in Freedom (Belgium)
- May 27 - Fantastic Animation Festival (United States)
- June 22 - The Rescuers (United States)
- July 20 - Robot Taekwon V: Underwater Rangers (South Korea)
- July 23 - Donald Duck's Summer Magic (United States)
- July 27 - Taekwon dongja Maruchi Arachi (South Korea)
- August 4 - Mr. Rossi's Dreams (Italy)
- August 6 - Space Battleship Yamato (Japan)
- August 24 - Race for Your Life, Charlie Brown (United States)
- September 16 - Around the World with Bolek and Lolek (Poland)
- November 3 - Pete's Dragon (United States)
- November 13 - A Journey to the Center of the Earth (United States)
- November 18 - The Mouse and His Child (United States and Japan)
- November 24 - 5 Weeks in a Balloon (United States)
- November 27 - The Hobbit (United States and Japan)
- December 1 - New Star of the Giants (Japan)
- December 7 - A Flintstone Christmas (United States)
- December 9 - Electronic Man 337 (South Korea)
- December 15 - Dot and the Kangaroo (Australia)

== Television series ==
=== Debuts ===
- January 1 - Yatterman debuts on Fuji TV.
- January 2 - Araiguma Rascal debuts on Fuji TV.
- February 3 - Jetter Mars debuts on Fuji TV.
- February 12 - The New Adventures of Batman debuts on CBS.
- February 14 - The Flumps debuts on BBC1.
- March 3 - Mechander Robo debuts on Tokyo Channel 12.
- March 6 - Wakusei Robo Danguard Ace debuts on FNS (Fuji TV).
- April 4 - Attack on Tomorrow debuts on Fuji TV.
- April 9 - Ginguiser debuts on ANN (ABC).
- June 4 - Chōdenji Machine Voltes V debuts on TV Asahi.
- June 7 - Monarch: The Big Bear of Tallac debuts on ABC.
- July 3 - Chojin Sentai Barattack debuts on ANN (ANB).
- August 26 - A kockásfülű nyúl debuts on Magyar Televízió.
- September 10:
  - Captain Caveman and the Teen Angels, Laff-A-Lympics, Scooby's All-Star Laff-A-Lympics, and The All-New Super Friends Hour debut on ABC.
  - What's New, Mr. Magoo?, The Robonic Stooges, The Skatebirds, Wonder Wheels, and The Batman/Tarzan Adventure Hour debut on CBS.
  - Baggy Pants and the Nitwits, CB Bears, Space Sentinels, The New Archie and Sabrina Hour, and I Am the Greatest: The Adventures of Muhammad Ali debut on NBC.
- September 12 - Ore wa Teppei debuts on Fuji TV.
- September 18 - Ippatsu Kanta-kun debuts on Fuji TV.
- September 22 - Arrow Emblem Hawk of the Grand Prix debuts on Fuji TV.
- October 1:
  - Star of the Giants debuts on Yomiuri Television.
  - Temple the Balloonist debuts on Fuji TV.
- October 2:
  - Ie Naki Ko debuts on Nippon TV.
  - Rittai Anime Ie Naki Ko debuts in syndication.
- October 3:
  - Fred Flintstone and Friends debuts in syndication.
  - Lupin III Part II debuts on Nippon TV.
- October 5:
  - Manga Nippon Emaki debuts on TBS.
  - Tobidase! Machine Hiryū debuts on TV Tokyo.
- October 8 - Invincible Super Man Zambot 3 debuts on NBN.
- October 17 - Dinosaur War Izenborg debuts on TV Tokyo.
- October 29 - Wakakusa no Charlotte debuts on ABC.
- November 11 - Manga Ijin Monogatari debuts in syndication.
- December 13 - Angie Girl debuts on ABC.
- December 23 - Yakyū-kyō no Uta debuts on Nippon TV.
- Specific date unknown - The Toothbrush Family debuts in syndication.

== Births ==
=== January ===
- January 2: Anna Cummer, Canadian actress (voice of Pepper Potts in Iron Man: Armored Adventures, Strawberry Shortcake in Strawberry Shortcake's Berry Bitty Adventures).
- January 7:
  - Dustin Diamond, American actor and comedian (voice of Chubby Kid in Yogi's Great Escape), (d. 2021).
  - Tomm Moore, Irish filmmaker, animator, illustrator and comics artist (co-founder of Cartoon Saloon).
- January 13: Orlando Bloom, English actor (voice of Prince Harry in The Prince).
- January 16: Gabe Lopez, American composer (Dora, Trolls: TrollsTopia), (d. 2026).
- January 17: Leigh Whannell, Australian actor (voice of Jatt in Legend of the Guardians: The Owls of Ga'Hoole).
- January 21: Jerry Trainor, American actor (voice of Dudley Puppy in T.U.F.F. Puppy, Will in Doc McStuffins, Commander Cone in Bunsen Is a Beast).
- January 23: Peter Sohn, American animator, director, voice actor, and storyboard artist (Pixar) (voice of Emile in Ratatouille, Scott 'Squishy' Squibbles in Monsters University, Sox in Lightyear).
- January 29: Justin Hartley, American actor (voice of Superman in Injustice).
- January 31:
  - Bobby Moynihan, American voice actor and comedian (voice of Louie in DuckTales, Panda in We Bare Bears, Fantos in Kid Cosmic, the title character in Chozen).
  - Kerry Washington, American actress, producer and director (voice of Shuri in Black Panther, Natalie Certain in Cars 3, Rayshelle Peyton in The Simpsons).

=== February ===
- February 2: Shakira, Columbian singer (voice of Gazelle in the Zootopia franchise and performed "Try Everything", and "Zoo", as well as "Todos Juntos" for Dora the Explorer ).
- February 7: Susanne Pollatschek, Scottish-British actress (voice of Olivia Flaversham in The Great Mouse Detective)
- February 9: A. J. Buckley, Irish-Canadian actor (voice of Toad in Wolverine and the X-Men, Melter, Klaw and Batroc the Leaper in The Super Hero Squad Show, Pigeon Pete in Teenage Mutant Ninja Turtles, Nash in The Good Dinosaur).
- February 17: Kara Edwards, American voice actress (voice of Goten and Videl in the Dragon Ball franchise).
- February 18: Ike Barinholtz, American actor, comedian, writer, director, and producer (voice of Tiny in The Angry Birds Movie, Wayne Edwards in Bless the Harts, Muscleman in The Awesomes, Lex Luthor in The Lego Movie 2: The Second Part).

=== March ===
- March 8: James Van Der Beek, American actor (voice of Boris in Vampirina, Jonathan "Mox" Moxon in the Robot Chicken episode "Message Chair", English dub voice of Pazu in Castle in the Sky), (d. 2026).
- March 9: Lydia Mackay, American voice actress (voice of Trisha Elric and Sloth in Fullmetal Alchemist).
- March 15: Rebecca O'Mara, Irish actress (voice of Caitlin in Thomas & Friends).
- March 22: Manda Rin, Scottish singer, artist and songwriter (performed the closing theme song from The Powerpuff Girls).
- March 23: Sindy Boveda-Spackman, American television writer (Nickelodeon Animation Studio, Peter Rabbit, The 7D, Get Blake!, Rusty Rivets, Sunny Day, Mutt & Stuff, The Epic Tales of Captain Underpants, Love Monster, Vampirina, The Chicken Squad, Do, Re & Mi) and script coordinator (Nickelodeon Animation Studio).
- March 24: Jessica Chastain, American actress and producer (voice of Gia in Madagascar 3: Europe's Most Wanted)
- March 25: Rob Oliver, American animator and director (The Simpsons).

=== April ===
- April 2: Thomas Krajewski, American television writer (The Replacements, Nickelodeon Animation Studio, Skunk Fu!, Kick Buttowski: Suburban Daredevil, YooHoo & Friends, Iron Man: Armored Adventures, Action Dad, Packages from Planet X, Monsuno, Max Steel, Buddy Thunderstruck, Scooby-Doo and Guess Who?, Boy Girl Dog Cat Mouse Cheese).
- April 3: Gavin Freitas, American animator (Brickleberry, Rick and Morty, Rainbow Brite, The SpongeBob Movie: Sponge Out of Water) and storyboard artist (Full English, Brickleberry, The Fairly OddParents, The Simpsons, Duncanville).
- April 8: Ana de la Reguera, Mexican actress (voice of Carmen Sánchez in The Book of Life, Ambassador Turais in Elio).
- April 9: Tim McKeon, American producer, director and screenwriter (Sitting Ducks, Cartoon Network Studios, Disney Television Animation, Top Cat: The Movie, Hilda, Kid Cosmic, co-creator of Out of Jimmy's Head).
- April 10: Stephanie Sheh, American voice actress, writer, and producer (voice of Mamimi Samejima in FLCL, Hinata Hyuga in Naruto, Eureka in Eureka Seven, Orihime Inoue in Bleach, Usagi Tsukino / Sailor Moon in the Viz Media dub of Sailor Moon, Mitsuha Miyamizu in Your Name, Lotte Yanson in Little Witch Academia, Mackenzie Mack / Glitter Spade in Glitter Force Doki Doki, Manon Chamack in Miraculous: Tales of Ladybug & Cat Noir, Katana in DC Super Hero Girls).
- April 14: Sarah Michelle Gellar, American actress (voice of the Seventh Sister in Star Wars Rebels, April O'Neil in TMNT, Teela in Masters of the Universe: Revelation, Ella in Happily N'Ever After, Gina Vendetti in The Simpsons, Buffy Summers, Daphne Blake and other various characters in Robot Chicken).
- April 23:
  - Eric Edelstein, American actor and comedian (voice of Chad in Clarence, Grizzly in We Bare Bears, B.O.B. in Monsters vs. Aliens, Coach Croach in The Fungies!, Daddy Shark in Baby Shark's Big Show!, Geoff in The Ghost and Molly McGee).
  - John Cena, American professional wrestler and actor (voice of the title character in Ferdinand, Baron Draxum in Rise of the Teenage Mutant Ninja Turtles, J.C. in Surf's Up 2: WaveMania, himself in Scooby-Doo! WrestleMania Mystery and The Flintstones & WWE: Stone Age SmackDown!).
  - John Oliver, English-American television host and actor (voice of Augustus Crumhorn in Central Park, Zazu in The Lion King, Vanity Smurf in The Smurfs and The Smurfs 2).
  - Kal Penn, American actor (voice of Mikku in Mira, Royal Detective, Ravi Singh in Fancy Nancy).

=== May ===
- May 1: Christian Lanz, Mexican actor (voice of Achi and Tez in Victor and Valentino, Esteban in Elena of Avalor, Gregorio Cortez in Spy Kids: Mission Critical, Fishface in Teenage Mutant Ninja Turtles, Scarecrow in Batman: Assault on Arkham).
- May 5: Virginie Efira, Belgian actress (French dub voice of Piper in Robots, Kitty Softpaws in Puss in Boots, and Mavis in the Hotel Transylvania franchise).
- May 10: David Menkin, Norwegian actor (voice of Jack and Porter in Thomas & Friends, Virgil Tracy and Gordon Tracy in Thunderbirds Are Go, Mr. Cleaver in Ron's Gone Wrong, Munki in Jungle Beat: The Movie).
- May 12:
  - Michael Jelenic, American television writer, producer, and animator (Batman: The Brave and the Bold, ThunderCats, Teen Titans Go!, The Super Mario Bros. Movie).
  - Rachel Wilson, Canadian actress (voice of Heather in Total Drama).
- May 13: Samantha Morton, English actress and director (voice of Ruby in Max & Ruby, Sonia in Free Jimmy).
- May 16: Melanie Lynskey, New Zealand actress (voice of Beatrice in Over the Garden Wall, Becky in The Life & Times of Tim, Pearl in Jake and the Never Land Pirates).
- May 19: Kelly Sheridan, Canadian voice actress (voice of Melody in My Little Pony Tales, Ukyo Kuoji in Ranma ½, Scarlet Witch in X-Men: Evolution, Leena Toros in Zoids: New Century, Sango in Inuyasha, Diana Lombard in Martin Mystery, Mammoth Mutt in Krypto the Superdog, Greenback Jane in Black Lagoon: The Second Barrage, Theresa in Class of the Titans, Starlight Glimmer in My Little Pony: Friendship Is Magic, Barbie in the Barbie film series from 2001 to 2010 and 2012 to 2015).
- May 23: Richard Ayoade, English actor, broadcaster, comedian, and filmmaker (voice of Edgar in Full English, Templeton in Strange Hill High, Mr. Pickles in The Boxtrolls, The Snowman in Danger Mouse, various characters in Neo Yokio, Treebor in Early Man, Onion in Apple & Onion, Ice Cream Cone in The Lego Movie 2: The Second Part, The Ghost in Moominvalley, Counselor Jerry B in Soul, Gordy and Alva Gunderson in Disenchantment, Professor Marmalade in The Bad Guys, Xeni in Dream Productions).
- May 28: Erin Mathews, Canadian voice actress (voice of Pac-Man in Pac-Man and the Ghostly Adventures, Coop Burtonburger in Kid vs. Kat, Benjamin Stilton in Geronimo Stilton, Gabby in My Little Pony: Friendship Is Magic, Kasey in Powerpuff Girls Z).

=== June ===
- June 1: Danielle Harris, American actress and film director (voice of Debbie Thornberry in The Wild Thornberrys, Sierra in Father of the Pride, Barbara in Night of the Living Dead: Darkest Dawn).
- June 2: Zachary Quinto, American actor and filmmaker (voice of Lex Luthor in Superman: Man of Tomorrow, Aiden in Big Mouth, Robot in Invincible, Barry Leibowitz-Jenkins in The Proud Family: Louder and Prouder).
- June 5: Kristin Gore, American author and screenwriter (Futurama).
- June 8: Kanye West, American actor and rapper (voice of Kenny West in The Cleveland Show).
- June 26: Tite Kubo, Japanese manga artist and character designer (Bleach).
- June 30: Colton Dunn, American comedian, actor, writer and producer (voice of Mayor Peeve in Middlemost Post, Russell Remington in Big City Greens, second voice of Mr. Smiley in Steven Universe).

=== July ===
- July 5: Armen Mirzaian, Iranian-born American animator, storyboard artist (Cartoon Network Studios, Hasbro Studios, Hulk and the Agents of S.M.A.S.H.) and writer (Adventure Time), (d. 2013).
- July 8: Milo Ventimiglia, American actor (voice of Spider-Man Noir in Ultimate Spider-Man).
- July 10:
  - Gwendoline Yeo, Singaporean actress (voice of Lady Shiva in Young Justice, Domino in Wolverine and the X-Men, Nala Se in the Star Wars franchise, Princess Iron Fan in Monkie Kid, Nyancy Chan and Shelane in Ben 10: Omniverse, Lilo in Stitch!).
  - Chiwetel Ejiofor, English actor (voice of Dr. Watson in Sherlock Gnomes, Scar in The Lion King).
- July 13: Kari Wahlgren, American voice actress (voice of Haruko Haruha in FLCL, Robin Sena in Witch Hunter Robin, Fuu in Samurai Champloo, Saya Otonashi in Blood +, Anemone in Eureka Seven, Celty Sturluson in Durarara!!, Charmcaster in the Ben 10 franchise, Shannon in OK K.O.! Let's Be Heroes, Nova in Super Robot Monkey Team Hyperforce Go!, Suzy Johnson in Phineas and Ferb, Emma Frost in Wolverine and the X-Men, Chloe Carmichael in The Fairly OddParents, Saturn Girl, Triplicate Girl, and Shrinking Violet in Legion of Super Heroes, Honey Buttowski in Kick Buttowski: Suburban Daredevil, Shellsea in Fish Hooks, Kimmy in Sym-Bionic Titan, Tigress in Kung Fu Panda: Legends of Awesomeness, Shandra Jimenez and Priscilla Northwest in Gravity Falls, Jessica in Rick and Morty, Amanda Killman in Bunsen Is a Beast, Zatanna in DC Super Hero Girls, Baby Scrat in Ice Age: Scrat Tales, Toasty in Oddballs).
- July 22: Joaquim Dos Santos, American storyboard artist, director, producer, writer, and designer (Warner Bros. Animation, Avatar: The Last Airbender, Voltron: Legendary Defender, Spider-Man: Across the Spider-Verse).
- July 26: Tony Sampson, Canadian former voice actor (voice of Gemini Man in Mega Man, Eddy in Ed, Edd n Eddy, Brock Wickersham in What About Mimi?, Fred in Transformers: Armada).
- July 27: Aaron Alexovich, American animator (The SpongeBob SquarePants Movie) and character designer (Invader Zim, Avatar: The Last Airbender, Randy Cunningham: 9th Grade Ninja).
- July 29: Mike MacRae, American actor, stand-up comedian, producer, director and writer (voice of Gauron in Full Metal Panic!, Leon Oswald in Kaleido Star, Hijikata Toshizō in Peacemaker Kurogane).
- July 30: Jaime Pressly, American actress (voice of Mrs. Quilligan in Horton Hears a Who!).

=== August ===
- August 2: Artemis Pebdani, American actress (voice of Gramma Alice in Big City Greens, Gran in The Croods: Family Tree, Ensign Karavitus in Star Trek: Lower Decks, Jan Serpent in Puss in Boots: The Last Wish).
- August 8:
  - Mary Faber, American actress (voice of Medusa in Ultimate Spider-Man and Hulk and the Agents of S.M.A.S.H., Quackson and Karaoke Katie in Doc McStuffins, Morbidia and Grace in Mighty Magiswords, Terry in The Fungies!).
  - Lindsay Sloane, American actress (voice of Big Sister in Why, Charlie Brown, Why?).
- August 11: Toby Chu, American film and television composer and artist (Father of the Pride, Legends of Oz: Dorothy's Return, Barbie: Star Light Adventure, Surf's Up 2: WaveMania, Bao, Henchmen, Stillwater, Centaurworld, The Monkey King).
- August 13: Damian O'Hare, Irish actor (voice of Tranche in The Adventures of Puss in Boots, John Constantine in Justice League Action, Chas Chandler in Constantine: City of Demons).
- August 23: Kenta Miyake, Japanese voice actor and narrator (voice of Scar in Fullmetal Alchemist Brotherhood, All Might in My Hero Academia, Muhammad Avdol in JoJo's Bizarre Adventure: Stardust Crusaders).

=== September ===
- September 7: Peter Shin, American animator, director, and producer (The Simpsons, Family Guy, American Dad!, Duckman, Freakazoid).
- September 8: Asami Sanada, Japanese actress (voice of Vita in Magical Girl Lyrical Nanoha, Jun Sakurada in Rozen Maiden, Kurumi Tokisaki in Date A Live, Sawako Yamanaka in K-On!, Dejiko in Di Gi Charat).
- September 10: Ryan Koh, American television producer and writer (Kappa Mikey, The Simpsons).
- September 11: Jackie Buscarino, American television writer and producer (Steven Universe, Victor and Valentino) and voice actress (voice of Vidalia in Steven Universe, Susan Strong in Adventure Time, Pacifica Northwest in Gravity Falls).
- September 14: Miyu Matsuki, Japanese actress (voice of Anna Nishikinomiya in Shimoneta, Choppy in Futari wa Pretty Cure Splash Star, Isumi Saginomiya in Hayate the Combat Butler, Kuko in Nyaruko: Crawling with Love), (d. 2015).
- September 15: Kenny Blank, American actor and musician (voice of Darren Patterson in As Told by Ginger, Lamar Abu Dabe in Pepper Ann).
- September 24:
  - Clément Sauvé, Canadian comic book artist and character designer (G.I. Joe: Renegades), (d. 2011).
  - Janelle Momary-Neely, American production manager (Disney Television Animation) and producer (The Replacements, Kick Buttowski: Suburban Daredevil, Bob's Burgers, Out There, The Awesomes, Central Park, The Great North, The Bob's Burgers Movie).
- September 25:
  - Clea DuVall, American actress, writer, producer, and director (co-creator and voice of Elsa in HouseBroken).
  - Dave Jeser, American television producer (Animation Domination High-Def, Solar Opposites) and writer (3-South, The Goode Family, The Cleveland Show, Axe Cop, Golan the Insatiable, co-creator of Drawn Together and DJ & the Fro).
- September 26:
  - Sirena Irwin, American voice actress (voice of Margaret SquarePants in SpongeBob SquarePants, Lois Lane and Mera in Batman: The Brave and the Bold, Alura in Superman: Unbound) and director (Voltron: Legendary Defender, Apple & Onion, Jurassic World Camp Cretaceous).
  - D.J. Lynch, American re-recording mixer (Nickelodeon Animation Studio, DreamWorks Animation Television, Neighbors from Hell, Bob's Burgers, Ben 10: Omniverse, Jake and the Never Land Pirates, The 7D, Inside Job).

=== October ===
- October 8: Jamie Marchi, American voice actress, ADR director and script writer (Funimation).
- October 11: Matt Bomer, American actor (voice of Superman in Superman: Unbound, Barry Allen in the Tomorrowverse).
- October 18: Peter Sohn, American animator, voice actor, storyboard artist, and film director (Pixar).
- October 20: Sam Witwer, American actor (voice of Ocean Master in Justice League: Throne of Atlantis, Darth Maul and Palpatine in the Star Wars franchise).
- October 26: Jon Heder, American actor (voice of Pickle in Pickle and Peanut, Oskar Greason in Star vs. the Forces of Evil, Reginald Skulinski in Monster House, Chicken Joe in Surf's Up and Surf's Up 2: WaveMania, the title character in Napoleon Dynamite).

=== November ===
- November 2: Reshma Shetty, English actress (voice of Elodie in OK K.O.! Let's Be Heroes, Queen Angella in She-Ra and the Princesses of Power).
- November 3: Daniel Pemberton, English composer and songwriter (Spider-Man: Into the Spider-Verse, Spider-Man: Across the Spider-Verse, Spider-Man: Beyond the Spider-Verse, The Bad Guys, The Bad Guys 2, Green Eggs and Ham).
- November 10: Brittany Murphy, American actress and singer (voice of Luanne Platter in King of the Hill, Tank in Pepper Ann, Gloria in Happy Feet), (d. 2009).
- November 11: Scoot McNairy, American actor and producer (voice of Cody in Pantheon, Scoot and Sun Thief in Axe Cop).
- November 16: Maggie Gyllenhaal, American actress (voice of Elizabeth in Monster House).
- November 19: Reid Scott, American actor (voice of Turbo in Turbo Fast, Mike Chilton in Motorcity, Green Arrow in Injustice).
- November 24: Colin Hanks, American actor (voice of Talking Tom in Talking Tom & Friends).

=== December ===
- December 1: Nate Torrence, American actor (voice of Benjamin Clawhauser in the Zootopia franchise, Chuck in Motorcity, Ferguson in Star vs. the Forces of Evil).
- December 6: Alaina Burnett, Canadian actress (voice of Sayla Mass in Mobile Suit Gundam).
- December 10: Jeff Prezenkowski, American television executive and writer (Cartoon Network, Warner Bros. Animation, Transformers: Prime, G.I. Joe: Renegades).
- December 18: Patricia Lyfoung, French comic artist and animator (Totally Spies!, Action Dad), (d. 2025).
- December 20: Michael John Roberts, American director (TripTank, BoJack Horseman, Strange Planet, Clone High), animator (TripTank, BoJack Horseman, Strange Planet, Clone High), screenwriter (TripTank) and producer (TripTank), (d. 2026).
- December 27: Jacqueline Pillon, Canadian actress (voice of Rintaro Namishima in Medabots, Matt in Cyberchase, Michel Mabuis in Chilly Beach, Cookie Falcone in Fugget About It).

=== Specific date unknown ===
- Cherry Chevapravatdumrong, American actor, comedian, author, television writer and producer (Family Guy).
- Sandro Corsaro, American producer, animator, and author (creator of Kick Buttowski: Suburban Daredevil).
- Ben Jones, American director, producer, writer, and voice actor (The Problem Solverz, OK K.O.! Let's Be Heroes, Saturday Morning All Star Hits!, Koala Man, Axe Cop, High School USA!).
- Kunio Kato, Japanese animator (La Maison en Petits Cubes).

== Deaths ==
=== February ===
- February 16: Frank Engli, American animator and comics artist, letterer and colorist (Fleischer Studios), dies at age 70.
- February 18: Andy Devine, American actor (voice of Friar Tuck in Robin Hood), dies at age 71.
- February 21: John Hubley, American animator, film director, producer, screenwriter and comics artist (Walt Disney Animation Studios, UPA and Sesame Street) dies at age 62.
- February 28: Eddie "Rochester" Anderson, American comedian and actor (voiced himself in The Mouse that Jack Built, Bobby Joe Mason in Harlem Globetrotters and The New Scooby-Doo Movies), dies at age 71.
- Specific date unknown: Irving Spector, American animator and comics artist (Fleischer Studios, Hanna-Barbera), dies at age 62.

=== March ===
- March 29: Peter Foldes, Hungarian-British animator and director (A Short Vision, Hunger), dies at age 52.

=== April ===
- April 11: Jacques Prévert, French poet and screenwriter, (The King and the Mockingbird), dies at age 77.
- April 25: Vera Tsekhanovskaya, Russian animator director and illustrator (Belgoskino, Lenfilm, directed The Wild Swans), dies at age 74.
- April 27: Scott Bradley, American composer arranger, pianist, and conductor (Walt Disney Company, Metro-Goldwyn-Mayer cartoon studio, Iwerks Studio), dies at age 85.

=== May ===
- May 21: Art Landy, American animator, specialized in animation set decoration (Walt Disney Animation Studios, Walter Lantz Studio), dies at age 73.

=== June ===
- June 4: Svend Methling, Danish actor and film director (The Tinderbox), dies at age 85.
- June 14: Alan Reed, American voice actor (voice of Fred Flintstone in The Flintstones, Dum Dum in Touche Turtle and Dum Dum, Boris the Russian Wolfhound in Lady and the Tramp), dies from bladder cancer at age 69.

=== July ===
- July: Milt Stein, American animator and comics artist (Terrytoons, Fleischer Studios), commits suicide at age 56.

=== August ===
- August 23: Sebastian Cabot, British actor (voice of the narrator and Sir Ector in The Sword in the Stone, Bagheera in The Jungle Book, narrator in The Many Adventures of Winnie the Pooh), dies at age 59.

=== September ===
- September 5: Tatsuo Yoshida, Japanese manga artist and animator (Speed Racer), dies from liver cancer at age 45.
- September 8: Zero Mostel, American actor (voice of Kehaar in Watership Down), dies at age 62.
- September 13: Leopold Stokowski, British-born American conductor (conductor in Fantasia), dies from a heart attack at age 95.
- September 29: Bob McKimson, American animator, director and illustrator (Looney Tunes, Foghorn Leghorn, Tasmanian Devil), dies at age 66.

=== October ===
- October 14: Bing Crosby, American singer and actor (narrator and voice of Ichabod Crane and Brom Bones in The Adventures of Ichabod and Mr. Toad), dies at age 74.

=== November ===
- November 5: René Goscinny, French comics writer, artist, magazine publisher and animation director (Asterix and Cleopatra, Daisy Town, The 12 Tasks of Asterix, La Ballade des Dalton), dies at age 51.

=== December ===
- December 18: Cyril Ritchard, Australian actor (voice of The Sandman in The Daydreamer, Emperor Klockenlocher in The Enchanted World of Danny Kaye: The Emperor's New Clothes, The Frog in Tubby the Tuba, Father Thomas in The First Christmas: The Story of the First Christmas Snow, Elrond in The Hobbit), dies at age 79.

== See also ==
- 1977 in anime
