= 1977 in anime =

The events of 1977 in anime.

== Events ==
- Establishment of Magic Bus animation studio.

== Releases ==
English name	Japanese name	Type	Demographic	Regions
Angie Girl	女王陛下のプティアンジェ (Joō-heika no Puti Anje)	TV	Shōjo	France, Italy, Netherlands, Japan, Poland, Russia, Arabia, Philippines
Arrow Emblem: Hawk of the Grand Prix	アローエンブレム・グランプリの鷹 (Arō Enburemu Guranpuri no Taka)	TV	Shōnen	France, Italy, Japan, Spanish, Russia, Poland, Sweden, Arabia, United States
Attack on Tomorrow!	あしたへアタック！ (Ashita e Atakku!)	TV	Shōjo	Japan, Italy, France
Balatack	超人戦隊バラタック (Chōjin Sentai Baratakku)	TV	Shōnen	Japan, Italy, Philippine
Charlotte	若草のシャルロット (Wakakusa no Charlotte)	TV	Shōjo	Japan, France, Italy, Arabia, Korea, Philippines
Danguard Ace	惑星ロボ ダンガードエース (Wakusei Robo Dangādo Ēsu)	TV	Shōnen	Japan, Italy, Philippines, United States
Danguard Ace vs. Insect Robot Troop	惑星ロボ ダンガードエース対昆虫ロボット軍団 (Wakusei Robo Dangādo Ēsu tai Konchū Robot Gundan)	Movie	Shōnen	Japan
Dinosaur War Izenborg	恐竜大戦争アイゼンボーグ (Kyōryū Daisensō Aizenbōgu)	TV	Shōnen	Arabia, Spain, Italy, Japan, United States
Formula 1	激走!ルーベンカイザー (Gekisō! Rubenkaiser)	TV	Shōnen	Japan
Ginguiser	超合体魔術ロボギンガイザー (Chōgattai Majutsu Robo Gingaizā)	TV	Shōnen	Japan, Italy
Guyslugger	氷河戦士ガイスラッガー (Hyōga Senshi Gaislugger)	TV	Shōnen	Japan, Italy
Homerun Kanta	一発貫太くん (Ippatsu Kanta-kun)	TV	Children	Japan, Spain, Italy, Poland
Invincible Super Man Zambot 3	無敵超人ザンボット3 (Muteki Chōjin Zanbotto Surī)	TV	Shōnen	Japan, Italy, Korea
Jetter Mars	ジェッターマルス (Jettā Marusu)	TV	Children	Italy, Spain, Portugal, Russia, Arabia, Japan
Jump Out! Machine Hiryu	とびだせ!マシーン飛竜 (Tobidase! Machine Hiryū)	TV	Shōnen	Japan, Italy
Little Jumbo	小さなジャンボ (Chiisana Jumbo)	Movie	Children	Japan
Lupin the 3rd Part II	新・ルパン三世 (Shin Rupan Sansei)	TV	Seinen	Japan, France, Spain, Italy, Philippines, United States
Mechander Robo	合身戦隊メカンダーロボ (Gasshin Sentai Mekandā Robo)	TV	Shōnen	Japan, Italy, Korea, Philippines
Monarch: The Big Bear of Tallac	シートン動物記 くまの子ジャッキー (Seton Doubutsuki: Kuma no Ko Jakki)	TV	Family, Children	Arabia, France, Spain, Germany, Portugal, Italy, Philippines, Poland, Japan, Korea
New Star of the Giants	新巨人の星 (Shin Kyojin no Hoshi)	TV	Shōnen	Japan, Italy
Nobody's Boy: Remi	家なき子 (Ie Naki Ko)	TV	Family	Netherlands, Italy, Japan, Spain, France, Russia, Arabia, China (Taiwan), Korea
Manga	漫画 (Manga)	Short	Family	Japan
Manga Japanese Picture Scroll	まんが日本絵巻 (Manga Nihon Emaki)	TV	Family	Japan, Italy
Manga Stories of Great Men	まんが偉人物語 (Manga Ijin Monogatari)	TV	Family	Japan, Italy, Arabia
Rascal the Raccoon	あらいぐまラスカル (Araiguma Rasukaru)	TV	Family	Japan, Germany, Spain, Italy, Arabia, Philippines, China (Taiwan)
The Rose Flower and Joe	バラの花とジョー (Bara no Hana to Joe)	Movie	Children	Japan
Song of Baseball Enthusiasts	野球狂の詩 (Yakyū-kyō no Uta)	TV	Shōnen	Japan, Italy
Space Battleship Yamato: The Movie	宇宙戦艦ヤマト 劇場版 (Uchū Senkan Yamato: Gekijōban)	Movie	Shōnen	Spain, Italy, Japan, France, China (Taiwan), United Kingdom, United States, Canada
Supercar Gattiger	超スーパーカー ガッタイガー (Chou Supercar Gattiger)	TV	Shōnen	Italy, Japan
Temple the Balloonist	風船少女テンプルちゃん (Fūsen Shōjo Tenpuru-chan)	TV	Children	Spain, France, Italy, Arabia, Japan
Teppei	おれは鉄兵 (Ore wa Teppei)	TV	Shōnen	Italy, Japan, Russia
Tenguri, Boy of the Plains	草原の子テングリ (Sougen no Ko Tenguri)	Movie	Children	Japan
Towards the Rainbow	虹に向って (Niji ni Mukatte)	Short	Family	Japan
Voltes V	超電磁マシーン ボルテスファイブ (Chōdenji Mashīn Borutesu Faibu)	TV	Shōnen	Japan, Korea, Spain, Italy, Philippines, Portugal, China (Hong Kong), China (Taiwan)
The Wild Swans	世界名作童話 白鳥の王子 (Sekai Meisaku Dōwa: Hakuchō no Ōji)	Movie	Family	Germany, Italy, France, Spain, Russia, Arabia, Japan, Korea, United States
Yatterman	ヤッターマン (Yattāman)	TV	Shōnen	Spain, Italy, Poland, Japan, Korea

== See also ==
- 1977 in animation
