= Spirited Away =

2001 film by Hayao Miyazaki

- Theatrical release poster

Japanese name
- Kanji: 千と千尋の神隠し
Transcriptions
- Revised Hepburn: Sen to Chihiro no Kamikakushi
- Directed by: Hayao Miyazaki
- Written by: Hayao Miyazaki
- Produced by: Toshio Suzuki
- Starring: Rumi Hiiragi; Miyu Irino; Mari Natsuki; Takashi Naito; Yasuko Sawaguchi; Tsunehiko Kamijō; Takehiko Ono; Bunta Sugawara
- Cinematography: Atsushi Okui
- Edited by: Takeshi Seyama
- Music by: Joe Hisaishi
- Production company: Studio Ghibli
- Distributed by: Toho
- Release date: 20 July 2001
- Running time: 124 minutes
- Country: Japan
- Language: Japanese
- Budget: $19.2 million
- Box office: $396 million (Note: Spirited Away's Worldwide Box Office: Original Run including re-release until Studio Ghibil Fest 2020 – US$395,580,000 (¥47,030,975,000); 2021 re-release in Spain – €186,772 (US$222,070 (equivalent to $263,850 in 2025)))

Spirited Away (Note: Japanese: 千と千尋の神隠し, Hepburn: Sen to Chihiro no Kamikakushi; transl. "Sen and Chihiro's Spiriting Away".) is a 2001 Japanese animated fantasy film written and directed by Hayao Miyazaki. It was produced by Toshio Suzuki, animated by Studio Ghibli, and distributed by Toho. The film stars Rumi Hiiragi, alongside Miyu Irino, Mari Natsuki, Takashi Naito, Yasuko Sawaguchi, Tsunehiko Kamijō, Takehiko Ono, and Bunta Sugawara. It follows a young girl named Chihiro "Sen" Ogino, who moves to a new neighborhood and inadvertently enters the world of kami (spirits of Japanese Shinto folklore). After her parents are turned into pigs by the witch Yubaba, Chihiro takes a job working in Yubaba's bathhouse to find a way to free herself and her parents and return to the human world.

Miyazaki wrote the screenplay after he decided the film would be based on the ten-year-old daughter of his friend Seiji Okuda, the film's associate producer, who came to visit his house each summer. At the time, Miyazaki was developing two personal projects, but they were rejected. With a budget of US$19 million, production of Spirited Away began in 2000. Pixar animator John Lasseter, a fan and friend of Miyazaki, convinced Walt Disney Studios to buy the film's North American distribution rights, and served as executive producer of its English-dubbed version. Lasseter then hired Kirk Wise as director and Donald W. Ernst as producer, while screenwriters Cindy and Donald Hewitt wrote the English-language dialogue to match the characters' original Japanese-language lip movements.

Released in Japan on 20 July 2001, Spirited Away was universally acclaimed and commercially successful, grossing US$396 million at the worldwide box office. It became the highest-grossing film in Japanese history with a total of ¥31.68 billion. It held the record for 19 years until it was surpassed by Demon Slayer: Kimetsu no Yaiba – The Movie: Mugen Train in 2020.

Spirited Away was a co-recipient of the Golden Bear at the 2002 Berlin International Film Festival and became the first hand-drawn, non-English-language animated film to win the Academy Award for Best Animated Feature at the 75th Academy Awards. The film is frequently regarded as one of the greatest films ever made, placing #75 on Sight and Sound's "100 Greatest Films of All Time" poll in 2022.

== Plot ==
Ten-year-old Chihiro Ogino and her parents are traveling to their new home in the countryside. They drive down an unexpected road and arrive in front of a tunnel leading to what appears to be an abandoned resort town, which her parents insist on exploring over Chihiro's protests. Upon finding a seemingly empty restaurant stocked with food, Chihiro's parents begin to eat. While exploring further, Chihiro finds an enormous bathhouse and meets a boy named Haku, who warns her to return across the riverbed before sunset. Spirits begin to appear, and Chihiro discovers that her parents have been transformed into pigs and that she cannot cross the now-flooded river.

Haku finds Chihiro and tells her to ask for a job from the bathhouse's boiler-man, Kamaji, a yōkai spirit. Kamaji instead asks a worker named Lin to bring Chihiro to Kamaji's master Yubaba, the witch who runs the bathhouse and who transformed Chihiro's parents. Yubaba tries to frighten Chihiro away but eventually gives her a work contract. As Chihiro signs the contract with her name (千尋), Yubaba takes away the second kanji in her name, renaming her Sen (千). Chihiro soon forgets her real name, and Haku explains that Yubaba controls people by taking their names; if Chihiro completely forgets her name like Haku did, she will never be able to leave the spirit world.

Workers in the bathhouse mock Chihiro. While working, she invites a silent creature named No-Face inside, believing him to be a customer. The spirit of a polluted river arrives as Chihiro's first customer. After she cleans him, he gives her a magic emetic dumpling as a token of gratitude. Meanwhile, No-Face demands food from the bathhouse workers, giving them gold in exchange. When Chihiro declines the gold and leaves to find Haku, No-Face angrily swallows some workers.

Chihiro sees paper shikigami spirits attacking a dragon and recognizes the dragon as a metamorphosed Haku. When the seriously injured Haku crashes into Yubaba's penthouse, Chihiro follows him upstairs. A shikigami that stowed away on her back shapeshifts into Yubaba's twin sister Zeniba, who turns Yubaba's son, Boh, into a mouse and creates a false copy of him. Zeniba tells Chihiro that Haku has stolen a magic golden seal from her that carries a deadly curse. Haku strikes the shikigami, causing Zeniba to vanish. Chihiro and Haku fall into the boiler room, where she feeds him part of the emetic dumpling, causing him to vomit up the seal and a slug, which Chihiro kills.

Chihiro resolves to return the seal and apologize to Zeniba. She confronts an engorged No-Face and feeds him the rest of the dumpling, forcing him to regurgitate the workers. No-Face follows Chihiro out of the bathhouse, and Lin helps them leave. Chihiro, No-Face, and Boh travel to see Zeniba using train tickets from Kamaji. Meanwhile, Yubaba nearly orders Chihiro's parents slaughtered, but Haku reveals Boh is missing and offers to retrieve him if Yubaba releases Chihiro and her parents.

Zeniba reveals to Chihiro that Yubaba used the slug to control Haku. Zeniba tells Chihiro that she cannot help her parents, but she makes her a magical protective hairband. Using his dragon form, Haku flies Chihiro and Boh back, while No-Face decides to stay with Zeniba. Mid-flight, Chihiro recalls falling into the Kohaku River years earlier and being washed safely ashore. She correctly guesses Haku's true identity as the spirit of the Kohaku River, which restores his memory.

When they arrive at the bathhouse, Yubaba tests Chihiro, asking her to identify her parents among a group of pigs. After she answers correctly that none of the pigs are her parents, her contract disappears and she is given back her real name. Haku takes her to the now-dry riverbed and vows to meet her again. Chihiro crosses the riverbed to her restored parents. Shortly before leaving for her new home, Chihiro looks back at the tunnel, still wearing her hairband from Zeniba.

== Voice cast ==
Character name		Voice actor	
English	Japanese	Japanese	English
Chihiro Ogino / Sen	Ogino Chihiro (荻野 千尋) / Sen (千) (Note: Lit. "one thousand".)	Rumi Hiiragi	Daveigh Chase
Haku / Spirit of the Kohaku River	Haku (ハク) / Nigihayami Kohakunushi (饒速水小白主) (Note: Lit. "flourishing swift-flowing amber [river] god".)	Miyu Irino	Jason Marsden
Yubaba	Yubāba (湯婆婆) (Note: Lit. "bathhouse granny".)	Mari Natsuki	Suzanne Pleshette
Zeniba	Zeniiba (銭婆) (Note: Lit. "money granny".)	Mari Natsuki	Suzanne Pleshette
Lin	Rin (リン)	Yoomi Tamai	Susan Egan
Kamaji	Kamajii (釜爺) (Note: Lit. "boiler grandad".)	Bunta Sugawara	David Ogden Stiers
Boh (baby)	Bō (坊)	Ryunosuke Kamiki	Tara Strong
Aniyaku (assistant manager)	Aniyaku (兄役)	Takehiko Ono	John Ratzenberger
Akio Ogino (Chihiro's father)	Ogino Akio (荻野 明夫)	Takashi Naitō	Michael Chiklis
Yūko Ogino (Chihiro's mother)	Ogino Yūko (荻野 悠子)	Yasuko Sawaguchi	Lauren Holly
No-Face	Kaonashi (顔無し) (Note: Lit. "faceless".)	Akio Nakamura	Bob Bergen
Aogaeru	Aogaeru (青蛙) (Note: Lit. "blue frog".)	Tatsuya Gashūin	Bob Bergen
Chichiyaku	Chichiyaku (父役)	Tsunehiko Kamijō	Paul Eiding
Bandai-gaeru (foreman)	Bandai-gaeru (番台蛙) (Note: Lit. "reception desk frog".)	Yō Ōizumi	Rodger Bumpass
River Spirit	Kawa no Kami (河の神)	Koba Hayashi	Jim Ward
Radish Spirit	Oshira-sama (お白様) (Note: Lit. "Great White Lord".)	Ken Yasuda	Jack Angel

== Production ==
=== Development and inspiration ===
I created a heroine who is an ordinary girl, someone with whom the audience can sympathize ... [It's] not a story in which the characters grow up, but a story in which they draw on something already inside them.

— Hayao Miyazaki

During summers, Hayao Miyazaki spent his vacation at a mountain cabin with his family and five girls who were friends of the family. The idea for Spirited Away came about when he wanted to make a film for these friends. Miyazaki had previously directed films for small children and teenagers such as My Neighbor Totoro and Kiki's Delivery Service, but he had not created a film for ten-year-old girls. For inspiration, he read the shōjo manga magazines (like Nakayoshi and Ribon) that the girls had left at the cabin, but felt they only offered subjects on "crushes" and romance. Miyazaki felt this was not what these young friends "held dear in their hearts", and resolved to make the film about a young heroine whom they could look up to.

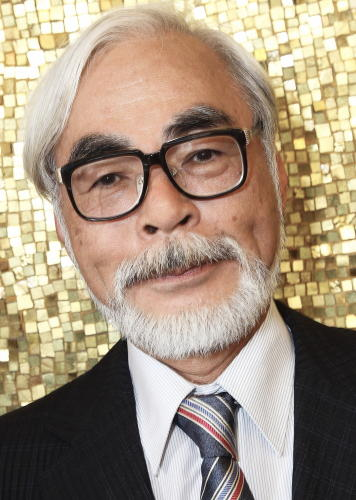
Director Hayao Miyazaki used shōjo manga magazines as inspiration for Spirited Away.

Miyazaki had wanted to produce a new film for years, but his two previous proposals—one based on the Japanese book The Village Beyond the Mist (Note: 霧のむこうのふしぎな町 (Kiri no Mukō no Fushigi na Machi, lit. 'The Mysterious Town Beyond the Mist') also published as The Marvelous Village Veiled in Mist) by Sachiko Kashiwaba, and another about a teenage heroine—were rejected. His third proposal, which ended up becoming Spirited Away, was more successful. The three stories revolved around a bathhouse that was inspired by one in Miyazaki's hometown. He thought the bathhouse was a mysterious place, and there was a small door next to one of the bathtubs in the bath house. Miyazaki was always curious about what was behind it, and he made up several stories about it, one of which inspired the bathhouse setting of Spirited Away.

Production of Spirited Away commenced in February 2000 on a budget of ¥1.9 billion (US$15 million). The film was produced in association with Tokuma Shoten, Nippon Television Network, Dentsu, Buena Vista Home Entertainment, Tohokushinsha Film, and Mitsubishi. Disney's 10% investment allowed for the right of first refusal for North American distribution. As with Princess Mononoke, Miyazaki and the Studio Ghibli staff experimented with computer animation. With the use of more computers and programs such as Softimage 3D, the staff learned the software, but used the technology carefully so that it enhanced the story, instead of "stealing the show". Each character was mostly hand-drawn. The biggest difficulty in making the film was to reduce its length. When production began, Miyazaki realized it would be more than three hours long if he made it according to his plot. He had to delete many scenes from the story, and tried to reduce the "eye candy" in the film because he wanted it to be simple. Miyazaki did not want to make the hero a "pretty girl". At the beginning, he was frustrated at how she looked "dull" and thought, "She isn't cute. Isn't there something we can do?" As the film neared the end, however, he was relieved to feel "she will be a charming woman."

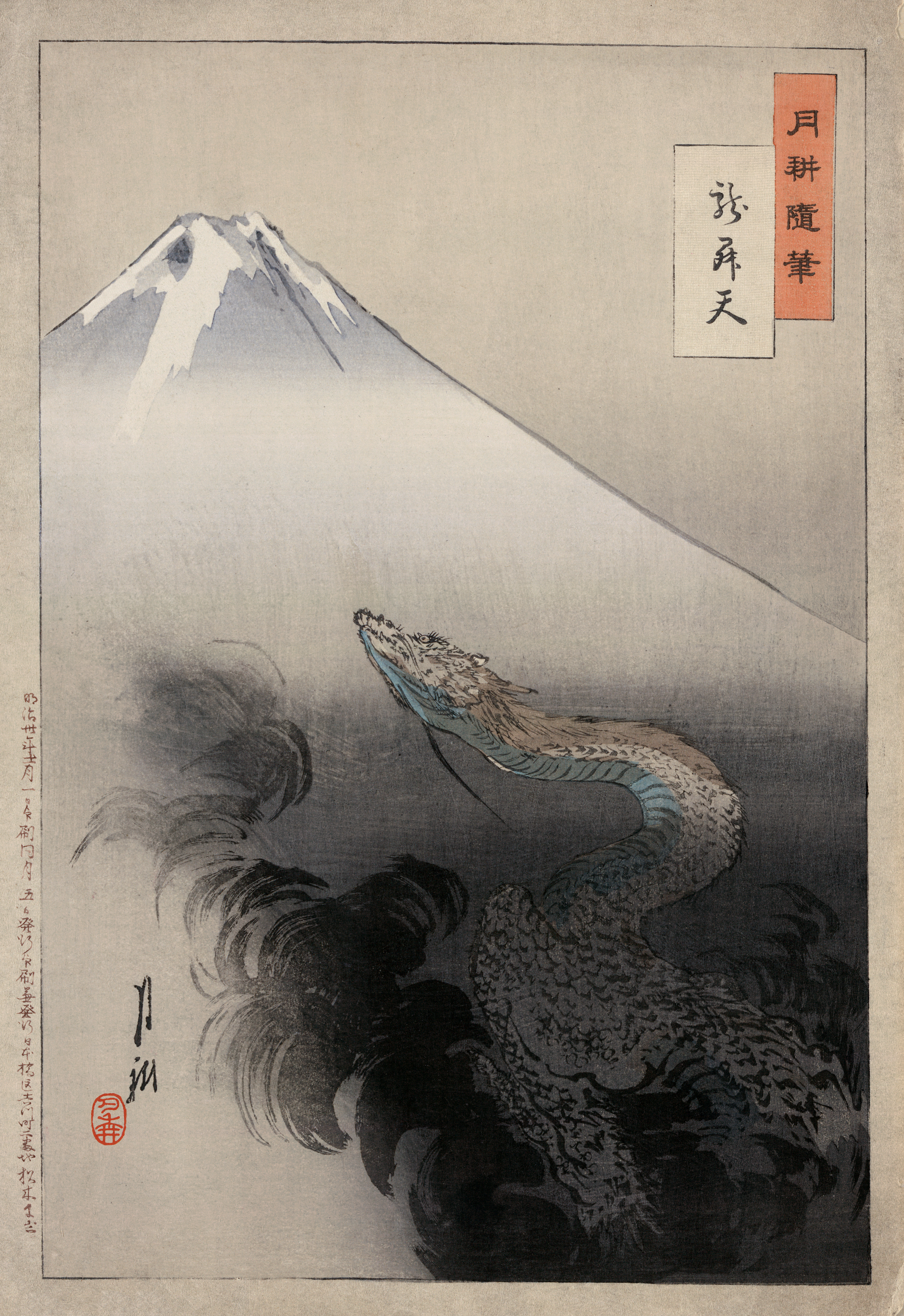
A Japanese dragon ascends toward the heavens with Mount Fuji in the background in this print from Ogata Gekkō. Spirited Away is heavily influenced by Japanese Shinto-Buddhist folklore.

During production, Miyazaki often sought inspiration by visiting the Edo-Tokyo Open Air Architectural Museum in Koganei, Tokyo. He based some of the buildings in the spirit world on the Pseudo-Western style buildings from the Meiji period that were available there. The museum made Miyazaki feel nostalgic, "especially when I stand here alone in the evening, near closing time, and the sun is setting – tears well up in my eyes." Another major inspiration was the Notoya Ryokan (能登谷旅館), a traditional Japanese inn located in Yamagata Prefecture, famous for its exquisite architecture and ornamental features. While some guidebooks and articles claim that the old gold town of Jiufen in Taiwan served as an inspirational model for the film, Miyazaki has denied this. The Dōgo Onsen was also an inspiration for the film's bathhouse.

Toshio Suzuki, the producer of the film, also cites European inspirations and influences in the production of Spirited Away. He specifically invokes the structure of the film as European-inspired due to Miyazaki's own influences by European films such as The Snow Queen and The Shepherdess and the Chimney Sweep.

=== Music ===
The film score of Spirited Away was composed and conducted by Miyazaki's regular collaborator Joe Hisaishi, and performed by the New Japan Philharmonic. The soundtrack received awards at the 56th Mainichi Film Competition Award for Best Music, the Tokyo International Anime Fair 2001 Best Music Award in the Theater Movie category, and the 17th Japan Gold Disk Award for Animation Album of the Year. Later, Hisaishi added lyrics to "One Summer's Day" and named the new version of the song "The Name of Life" (いのちの名前, "Inochi no Namae") which was performed by Ayaka Hirahara.

The closing song, "Always With Me" (いつも何度でも, "Itsumo Nando Demo"; lit. 'Always, No Matter How Many Times') was written and performed by Youmi Kimura, a composer and lyre-player from Osaka. The lyrics were written by Kimura's friend Wakako Kaku. The song was intended to be used for Rin the Chimney Painter (煙突描きのリン, Entotsu-kaki no Rin), a different Miyazaki film which was never released. In the special features of the Japanese DVD, Hayao Miyazaki explains how the song in fact inspired him to create Spirited Away. The song itself would be recognized as Gold at the 43rd Japan Record Awards.

Besides the original soundtrack, there is also an image album, titled Spirited Away Image Album (千と千尋の神隠し イメージアルバム, Sen to Chihiro no Kamikakushi Imēji Arubamu), that contains 10 tracks.

=== English dub ===
John Lasseter, Pixar animator and a fan and friend of Miyazaki, would often sit with his staff and watch Miyazaki's work when encountering story problems. After seeing Spirited Away, Lasseter was ecstatic. Upon hearing his reaction to the film, Disney CEO Michael Eisner asked Lasseter if he would be interested in introducing Spirited Away to an American audience. Lasseter obliged by agreeing to serve as the executive producer for the English adaptation. Following this, several others began to join the project: Beauty and the Beast co-director Kirk Wise and Aladdin co-producer Donald W. Ernst joined Lasseter as director and producer of Spirited Away, respectively. Screenwriters Cindy Davis Hewitt and Donald H. Hewitt penned the English-language dialogue, which they wrote in order to match the characters' original Japanese-language lip movements.

The cast of the film consists of Daveigh Chase, Jason Marsden, Suzanne Pleshette (in her final film role before her death in January 2008), Michael Chiklis, Lauren Holly, Susan Egan, David Ogden Stiers and John Ratzenberger (a Pixar regular). Advertising was limited, with Spirited Away being mentioned in a small scrolling section of the film section of Disney.com; Disney had sidelined their official website for Spirited Away and given the film a comparatively small promotional budget. Marc Hairston writing for FPS Magazine argues that this was a justified response to Studio Ghibli's retention of the merchandising rights to the film and characters, which limited Disney's ability to properly market the film.

== Themes ==
=== Supernaturalism ===
The major themes of Spirited Away, heavily influenced by Japanese Shinto-Buddhist folklore, center on the protagonist, Chihiro, and her liminal journey through the realm of spirits. The central location of the film is a Japanese bathhouse where a great variety of Japanese folklore creatures, including kami, come to bathe. Miyazaki cites the solstice rituals when villagers call forth their local kami and invite them into their baths. Chihiro also encounters kami of animals and plants. Miyazaki says of this:

In my grandparents' time, it was believed that kami existed everywhere – in trees, rivers, insects, wells, anything. My generation does not believe this, but I like the idea that we should all treasure everything because spirits might exist there, and we should treasure everything because there is a kind of life to everything.

Chihiro's archetypal entrance into another world changes her status as one somewhere between child and adult. Chihiro also stands outside societal boundaries in the supernatural setting. The use of the word kamikakushi (literally 'hidden by gods') within the Japanese title, and its associated folklore, reinforces this liminal passage: "Kamikakushi is a verdict of 'social death' in this world, and coming back to this world from Kamikakushi meant 'social resurrection.'"

Additional themes are expressed through No-Face, who reflects the characters who surround him, learning by example and taking the traits of whomever he consumes. This nature results in No-Face's monstrous rampage through the bathhouse. After Chihiro saves No-Face with the emetic dumpling, he becomes timid once more. At the end of the film, Zeniba decides to take care of No-Face so he can develop without the negative influence of the bathhouse.

==== Fantasy ====
The film has been compared to Lewis Carroll's Alice's Adventures in Wonderland and Through the Looking Glass, as the stories are set in fantasy worlds, involve disturbances in logic and stability, and there are motifs such as food having metamorphic qualities; though other developments and themes are not shared.

Upon gaining employment at the bathhouse, Yubaba's seizure of Chihiro's true name symbolically kills the child, who must then assume adulthood. She then undergoes a rite of passage according to the monomyth format; to recover continuity with her past, Chihiro must create a new identity.

=== Traditional Japanese culture ===
Spirited Away contains critical commentary on modern Japanese society concerning generational conflicts and environmental issues. Chihiro has been seen as a representation of the shōjo, whose roles and ideology had changed dramatically since post-war Japan. Just as Chihiro seeks her past identity, Japan, in its anxiety over the economic downturn occurring during the release of the film in 2001, sought to reconnect to past values. In an interview, Miyazaki has commented on this nostalgic element for an old Japan.

Japanese philosophy plays a huge role in Spirited Away, specifically through concepts like Kami and principles like Mottainai and On. The concept of Kami, for instance, involves various spirits that each represent different elements and aspects of nature. The principle of Mottainai, which is deeply ingrained in Japanese culture, embodies a sense of regret towards waste, valuing the complete utilization of an object or resource. While the principle of On, a key tenet of Japanese ethics that signifies a sense of moral indebtedness, plays a significant role in Chihiro's character development.

=== Western consumerism ===
Similar to the Japanese concept of On, the film can be partly understood as an exploration of the effect of greediness and Western consumerism on traditional Japanese culture. For instance, Yubaba is stylistically unique within the bathhouse, wearing a Western dress and living among European décor and furnishings, in contrast with the minimalist Japanese style of her employees' quarters, representing the Western capitalist influence over Japan in its Meiji period and beyond. Along with its function within the ostensible coming of age theme, Yubaba's act of taking Chihiro's name and replacing it with Sen (an alternate reading of chi, the first character in Chihiro's name, lit. 'one thousand') can be thought of as symbolic of capitalism's single-minded concern with value.

The film's setting encapsulates Miyazaki's commentary on modern Japanese values and the erosion of cultural heritage. The bathhouse, situated within an abandoned theme park, symbolizes Japan's distorted cultural identity. This once-traditional locale is marred by neon signs and Westernization, exemplifying cultural degradation. Early scenes highlight economic concerns and consumerism. Several cultural critics and sociologists have interpreted the bathhouse as an allegory for labor exploitation. Scholars note that Yubaba's practice of renaming employees symbolizes the stripping of legal and personal identity often experienced by marginalized or migrant workers. The film's visuals underscore the commercialization of Japanese culture. The failed theme park serves as a metaphor for the unsuccessful fusion of ideologies. The Meiji design of the park is the setting for Chihiro's parents' metamorphosis – the family arrives in an imported Audi car and the father wears a European-styled polo shirt, reassuring Chihiro that he has "credit cards and cash", before morphing into literal consumerist pigs because of their bad habits. Miyazaki has stated:

Chihiro's parents turning into pigs symbolizes how some humans become greedy ... There were people that "turned into pigs" during Japan's bubble economy (consumer society) of the 1980s, and these people still haven't realized they've become pigs. Once someone becomes a pig, they don't return to being human but instead gradually start to have the "body and soul of a pig". These people are the ones saying, "We are in a recession and don't have enough to eat." ... Perhaps this isn't a coincidence and the food is actually (an analogy for) "a trap to catch lost humans".

The bathhouse of the spirits cannot be seen as a place free of ambiguity and darkness. Many of the employees are rude to Chihiro because she is human, and corruption is ever-present; it is a place of excess and greed, as depicted in the initial appearance of No-Face. In stark contrast to the simplicity of Chihiro's journey and transformation is the constantly chaotic carnival in the background.

=== Environmentalism ===
Commentators have often referred to environmental themes in the films of Miyazaki. In Spirited Away, two major instances of allusions to environmental issues have been noted. Pam Coats, for example, a vice president of Walt Disney Feature Animation, describes Chihiro dealing with the "stink spirit", who, it turns out, is actually a river spirit but is so corrupted with filth that one cannot tell what it is at first glance. It only becomes clean again when Chihiro pulls out a huge amount of trash, including car tires, garbage, and a bicycle. This alludes to human pollution of the environment, and how people can carelessly toss away things without thinking of the consequences and of where the trash will go.

The second allusion is seen in Haku himself. Haku does not remember his name and lost his past, which is why he is stuck at the bathhouse. Eventually, Chihiro remembers that he used to be the spirit of the Kohaku River, which was destroyed and replaced with apartments. Because of humans' need for development, they destroyed a part of nature, causing Haku to lose his home and identity. This can be compared to deforestation and destruction of natural habitats; humans tear down nature, cause imbalance in the ecosystem, and demolish animals' homes to satisfy their want for more space (housing, malls, stores, etc.) but do not think about how it can affect other living things.

== Release ==
=== Box office and theatrical release ===
Spirited Away was released theatrically in Japan on 20 July 2001 by distributor Toho. It grossed a record ¥1.6 billion ($13.1 million) in its first three days, beating the previous record set by Princess Mononoke. It was number one at the Japanese box office for its first eleven weeks and spent 16 weeks there in total. After 22 weeks of release and after grossing $224 million in Japan, it started its international release, opening in Hong Kong on 13 December 2001. It was the first film that had grossed more than $200 million at the worldwide box office excluding the United States. It went on to gross ¥30.4 billion to become the highest-grossing film in Japanese history, according to the Motion Picture Producers Association of Japan. It also set the all-time attendance record in Japan, surpassing the 16.8 million tickets sold by Titanic. Its gross at the Japanese box office has since increased to ¥31.68 billion, as of 2020.

In February 2002, Wild Bunch, an international sales company that had recently spun off from its former parent company StudioCanal, picked up the international sale rights for the film outside of Asia and France. The company would then on-sell it to independent distributors across the world. On 13 April 2002, The Walt Disney Company acquired the Taiwanese, Singaporean, Hong Kong, French and North American sale rights to the film, alongside Japanese Home Media rights.

Disney's English dub of the film, supervised by Lasseter, premiered at the Toronto International Film Festival on 7 September 2002 and was later released in the United States on 20 September 2002. The film grossed $450,000 in its opening weekend from 26 theatres. Spirited Away had very little marketing, less than Disney's other B-films, with a maximum of 151 theatres showing the film in 2002. After the 2003 Oscars, it expanded to 714 theatres. It ultimately grossed around $10 million by September 2003. Outside of Japan and the United States, the movie was moderately successful in both South Korea and France, where it grossed $11 million and $6 million, respectively. In Argentina, it is in the top 10 anime films with the most tickets sold.

In the United Kingdom, then-independent based film distributor Optimum Releasing acquired the rights to the movie from Wild Bunch in January 2003. The company then released it theatrically on 12 September 2003. The movie grossed $244,437 on its opening weekend from 51 theatres, and by the end of its theatrical run in October, the movie had grossed $1,383,023 in the country.

About 18 years after its original release in Japan, Spirited Away had a theatrical release in China on 21 June 2019. It followed the theatrical release in China of My Neighbour Totoro in December 2018. The delayed theatrical release in China was due to long-standing political tensions between China and Japan, but many Chinese became familiar with Miyazaki's films due to rampant video piracy. It topped the Chinese box office with a $28.8-million opening weekend, beating Toy Story 4 in China. In its second weekend, Spirited Away grossed a cumulative $54.8 million in China, and was second only behind Spider-Man: Far From Home that weekend. As of 16 July 2019, the film has grossed $70 million in China, bringing its worldwide total box office to $346 million as of 8 July 2019.

Spirited Away's worldwide box office total stands at US$395,802,070.

=== Home media ===
Spirited Away was first released on VHS and DVD formats in Japan by Buena Vista Home Entertainment on 19 July 2002. The Japanese DVD releases include storyboards for the film and the special edition includes a Ghibli DVD player. Spirited Away sold 5.5 million home video units in Japan by 2007, and holds the record for most home video copies sold of all time in the country as of 2014. The movie was released on Blu-ray by Walt Disney Studios Japan on 14 July 2014, and DVD was also reissued on the same day with a new HD master, alongside several other Studio Ghibli movies.

In North America, the film was released on DVD and VHS formats by Walt Disney Home Entertainment on 15 April 2003. The attention brought by the Oscar win resulted in the film becoming a strong seller. The bonus features include Japanese trailers, a making-of documentary which originally aired on Nippon Television, interviews with the North American voice actors, a select storyboard-to-scene comparison and The Art of Spirited Away, a documentary narrated by actor Jason Marsden. The movie was released on Blu-ray in North America by Walt Disney Studios Home Entertainment on 16 June 2015. GKIDS and Shout! Factory re-issued the film on Blu-ray and DVD on 17 October 2017 following the expiration of Disney's previous deal with Studio Ghibli in the country in North America. On 12 November 2019, GKIDS and Shout! Factory issued a North-America-exclusive Spirited Away collector's edition, which includes the film on Blu-ray, and the film's soundtrack on CD, as well as a 40-page book with statements by Toshio Suzuki and Hayao Miyazaki, and essays by film critic Kenneth Turan and film historian Leonard Maltin. Along with the rest of the Studio Ghibli films, Spirited Away was released on digital markets in the United States for the first time, on 17 December 2019.

In the United Kingdom, the film was released on DVD and VHS as a rental release through independent distributor High Fliers Films PLC following the film's limited theatrical release. It was later officially released on DVD in the UK on 29 March 2004, with the distribution being done by Optimum Releasing themselves. In 2006, the DVD was reissued as a single-disc release (without the second one) with packaging matching other releases in Optimum's "The Studio Ghibli Collection" range. The then-renamed StudioCanal UK released the movie on Blu-ray on 24 November 2014, A British 20th Anniversary Collector's Edition, similar to other Studio Ghibli anniversary editions released in the UK, was released on 25 October 2021.

In the United States, the 2015 Blu-ray release grossed $9,925,660 from 557,613 physical units sold as of 21 February 2021. In the United Kingdom, the film's Studio Ghibli anniversary release appeared several times on the annual lists of best-selling foreign language film on home video, ranking number six in 2015, number five in 2016, and number one in 2019.

=== Television ===
The film was aired on Nippon TV (NTV) in Japan, on 24 January 2003. It became NTV's most-watched film of all time with a 46.9% audience rating, surpassing the 35.1% record previously set by Princess Mononoke in 1999.

In the United Kingdom, the film was watched by 670,000 viewers on BBC2 in 2010. This made it the year's most-watched foreign-language film on BBC, and the year's second highest foreign film on UK television (below the Indian Bollywood film Om Shanti Om). Spirited Away was later watched by 300,000 UK viewers on BBC2 in 2011, making it the year's most-watched foreign-language film on BBC2.

== Reception ==
=== Critical response ===
On review aggregator Rotten Tomatoes, the film holds a 96% approval rating based on 226 reviews, with an average rating of 8.8/10. The website's critics consensus reads, "Spirited Away is a dazzling, enchanting, and gorgeously drawn fairy tale that will leave viewers a little more curious and fascinated by the world around them." The site ranked it 28th on their "300 Best Movies of All Time" list in 2025. On Metacritic, it has a weighted average score of 96 out of 100 based on reviews from 41 critics, indicating "universal acclaim".

Roger Ebert of the Chicago Sun-Times gave the film a full four stars, praising the work and Miyazaki's direction. Ebert also said that Spirited Away was one of "the year's best films", and added it to his "Great Movies" list. Elvis Mitchell of The New York Times positively reviewed the film and praised the animation. Mitchell drew a favorable comparison to Lewis Carroll's Through the Looking-Glass, and wrote that Miyazaki's "movies are as much about moodiness as mood" and that "the prospect of animated figures not being what they seem – either spiritually or physically – heightens the tension." Derek Elley of Variety said that Spirited Away "can be enjoyed by sprigs and adults alike" and praised the animation and music. Kenneth Turan of the Los Angeles Times praised Miyazaki's direction and the voice acting, as well as saying that the film is the "product of a fierce and fearless imagination whose creations are unlike anything a person has seen before." Orlando Sentinel's critic Jay Boyar also praised Miyazaki's direction and said the film is "the perfect choice for a child who has moved into a new home."

In 2004, Cinefantastique listed the film as one of the "10 Essential Animations". In 2005, Spirited Away was ranked by IGN as the 12th-best animated film of all time. The film is also the ninth highest-rated film of all time on Metacritic, being the highest rated traditionally animated film on the site. The film ranked tenth in Empire magazine's "The 100 Best Films of World Cinema" in 2010. In 2010, Rotten Tomatoes ranked it as the thirteenth-best animated film on the site, and in 2012, as the seventeenth. In 2019, it topped the site's list of 140 essential animated films. The film was ranked at number 46 on Time Out magazine's list of "The 100 Best Movies of All Time". The film is listed within the top ten on the British Film Institute's list of "Top 50 films for children up to the age of 14". In 2016, it was voted the fourth-best film of the 21st century by the BBC, as picked by 177 film critics from around the world, making it the highest-ranking animated film on the list. In 2017, The New York Times ranked it as the second best film of the 21st Century so far. In 2020, Sight & Sound magazine listed the film as the best Japanese film of 2001. In 2021, the Writers Guild of America ranked Spirited Away's screenplay the 67th greatest of the 21st century so far. In 2022, the film was ranked number 75 on The Sight and Sound Greatest Films of All Time 2022, being one of two animated films to make the list (alongside Miyazaki's own My Neighbor Totoro). In 2025, the film ranked number 9 on The New York Times' list of "The 100 Best Movies of the 21st Century." In July 2025, it ranked number 15 on Rolling Stone's list of "The 100 Best Movies of the 21st Century."

In his book Otaku, Hiroki Azuma observed: "Between 2001 and 2007, the otaku forms and markets quite rapidly won social recognition in Japan," and cites Miyazaki's win at the Academy Awards for Spirited Away among his examples.

=== Accolades ===
Award	Year	Category	Recipient	Result	Ref.
56th Mainichi Film Awards	2001	Best Film	Spirited Away	Won	
56th Mainichi Film Awards	2001	Best Animated Film	Spirited Away	Won	
56th Mainichi Film Awards	2001	Best Director	Hayao Miyazaki	Won	
52nd Berlin International Film Festival	2002	Golden Bear	Spirited Away	Won (Note: Shared with Bloody Sunday)	
25th Japan Academy Award	2002	Best Film	Spirited Away	Won	
Tokyo Anime Award	2002	Animation of the Year	Spirited Away	Won	
Tokyo Anime Award	2002	Best Director	Hayao Miyazaki	Won	
75th Academy Awards	2003	Best Animated Feature	Spirited Away	Won	
30th Annie Awards	2003	Best Animated Feature	Spirited Away	Won	
30th Annie Awards	2003	Directing in an Animated Feature Production	Hayao Miyazaki	Won	
29th Saturn Awards	2003	Best Animated Film	Spirited Away	Won	
57th British Academy Film Awards	2004	Best Film Not in the English Language	Spirited Away	Nominated	

== Impact and legacy ==
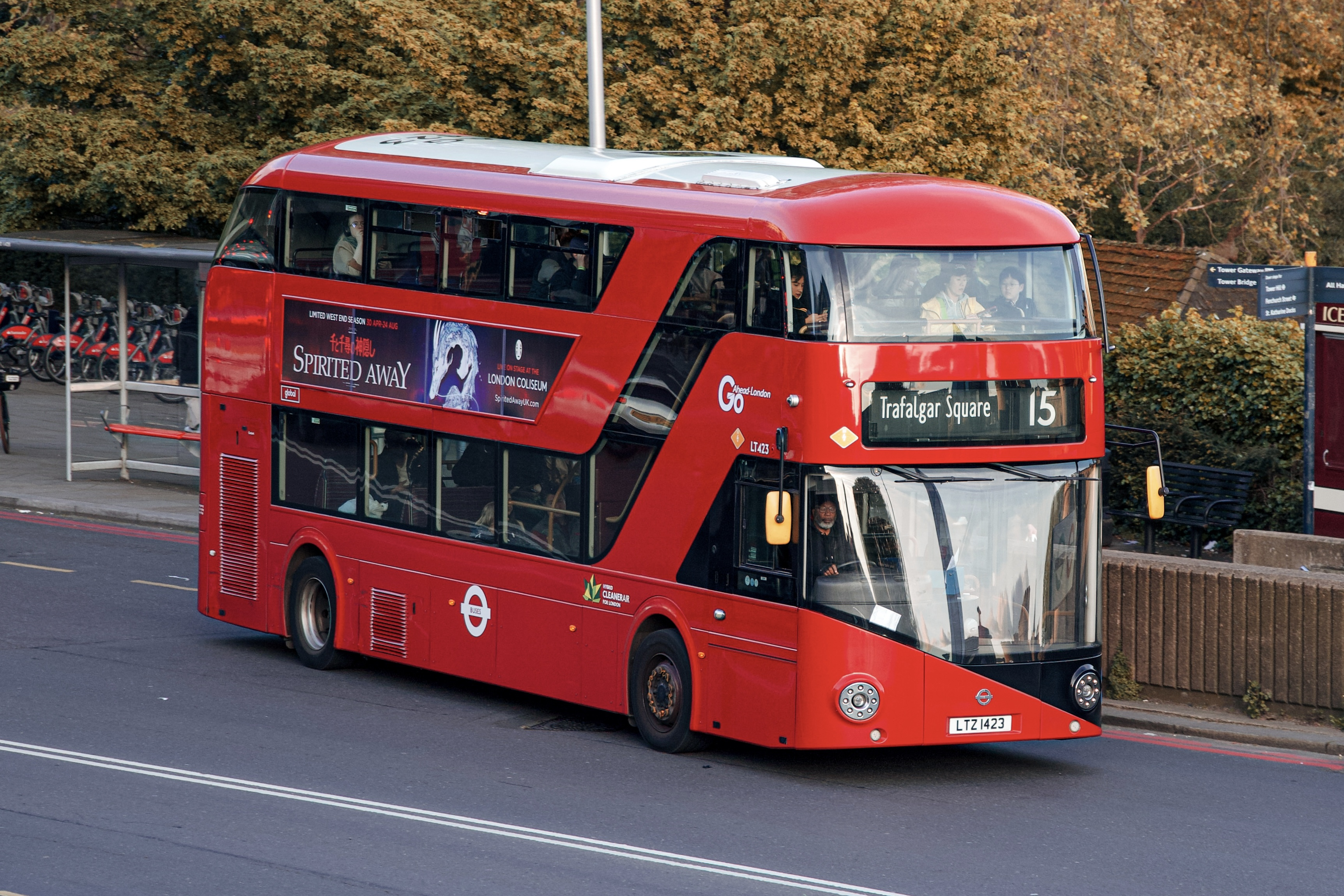
Double-decker bus in London carrying an advertisement banner for the stage adaption cast of Spirited Away in April 2024

=== Film industry ===
Spirited Away is frequently regarded as one of the best films of the 21st century as well as one of the greatest animated films ever made. Vice also declared Spirited Away to be the all-time best animated film and wrote that the film "showed how breathtaking, heartfelt, and serious animation can be" that "Pixar, Disney, and other mainstream animators have still failed to genuinely realize 15 years later". In 2016, the BBC placed the film fourth on its list of the 100 Greatest Films of the 21st Century.

Steven Spielberg said that Spirited Away might be "better than any Disney films" he has ever seen. Rayna Denison told Time: "This is a film made by a master animator at the height of his powers and it is one where the quality of the animation really does set it apart from everything else around it. Nobody else was making films that looked like this or that were as inventive as this was at this time". The film has been cited as an influence on various Disney and Pixar animated films. Production designer Harley Jessup said that he initially looked at Spirited Away and was inspired by its spiritual elements to utilize similar themes in Coco. Co-writers Ken and Ryan Firpo cited the film as one of the influences that helped them explore "ideas of morality and humanity" in Eternals. Turning Red's director Domee Shi named Spirited Away as one of her favorite animated films and one of the influences for her film.

=== Commercial and cultural significance ===
According to Time, Spirited Away "arrived at a time when animation was widely perceived as a genre solely for children, and when cultural differences often became barriers to the global distribution of animated works" but it "shattered preconceived notions about the art form and also proved that, as a film created in Japanese with elements of Japanese folklore central to its core, it could resonate deeply with audiences around the world". Denison emphasized that John Lasseter and Disney "boosted Spirited Away's visibility in America by heavily campaigning for the film to be considered for the Academy Awards", and cited it as one of the reasons why it won Academy Award for Best Animated Feature. Writer Jonathan Clements, whose published works revolve around East Asian culture, anime, and Japanese television dramas, emphasized that the film's Oscar win was "a wake-up call for a lot of people in the film business who had been disregarding Japanese animation for years". Susan Napier, professor of Japanese studies at Tufts University, called Spirited Away's wins at major Western award shows "a very big shot in the arm to the Japanese animation industry". She further explained that cartoons in the West have often been seen as "childish, vulgar, things that you didn't take seriously" but after the film took home the Academy Award, people were starting to see animation as "a real art form". In 2024, Billie Eilish released the song "Chihiro", inspired by the film and named after the main character.

=== Stage adaptation ===
A stage adaptation of Spirited Away was announced in February 2021 with a world premiere planned in Tokyo on 28 February 2022. It is written and directed by John Caird, with Toho as the production company, with Studio Ghibli's blessing. The role of Chihiro is played by both Kanna Hashimoto and Mone Kamishiraishi. In August 2023, it was announced that the production would have its European premiere at the London Coliseum from April 2024, with most of the cast reprising their roles.

Main Cast
Character name	Actor (Double Cast)	
Chihiro (千尋)	Kanna Hashimoto	Mone Kamishiraishi
Haku (ハク)	Kotaro Daigo	Hiroki Miura
Kaonashi (顔無し)	Koharu Sugawara	Tomohiko Tsujimoto
Rin (リン)	Miyu Sakihi	Fuu Hinami
Kamajī (釜爺)	Tomorowo Taguchi	Satoshi Hashimoto
Yubāba (湯婆婆) / Zenība (銭婆)	Mari Natsuki	Romi Park

== See also ==
- 2000s in film
- Isekai
- List of highest-grossing anime films
- Noppera-bō: Japanese "no-face" spirit
