= Yoshitaka Tamba =

Japanese actor

Yoshitaka Tamba (丹波 義隆)
- Born: July 13, 1955 (age 70); Tokyo, Japan

Yoshitaka Tamba (丹波 義隆, Tamba Yoshitaka; born July 13, 1955) is a Japanese actor. He is the eldest son of actor Tetsurō Tamba. He played Goro Sakurai in JAKQ Dengekitai in which he dated Mitchi Love

== Biography ==
In 1973, while attending high school, he landed a part in the movie Sumi yuriko directed by Omori Kenziro. He also appeared in the movie Aoba shigeru reru around the same time. Yoshitaka also extended his film career into television acting with the 1975 NHK television series Mizuiro no toki. In 1977, Yoshitaka and his father Tetsuro appeared in the film Alaska Monogatari.

Yoshitaka graduated from Tokyo Toritsu Suginami High School. He continued his education at Seijo University but dropped out before graduating. Yoshitaka has been multiple movies and television series since his debut.

== Filmography ==
=== Films ===
- Hatachi no Genten (二十歳の原点) (1973) - Masao
- Aoba Shigereru (青葉繁れる) (1974) - Minoru Tajima
- Zaou Zesshou (蔵王絶唱) (1974)
- Tokkan (吶喊) (1975)
- Gambare! Waka Daishou (がんばれ!若大将) (1975)
- Takehisa Yumeji Monogatari, Koisuru (竹久夢二物語 恋する) (1975)
- Gekitotsu! Waka Daishō (激突!若大将) (1976)
- Alaska Monogatari (アラスカ物語) (1977)
- J.A.K.Q Dengekitai VS Goranger (ジャッカー電撃隊VSゴレンジャー) (1977) - Goroh Sakurai / Spade Ace
- Kaerazaru hibi (帰らざる日々) (1978)
- Kamisama Naze Ai ni Kokkyou ga Aru no (神様なぜ愛に国境があるの) (1979)
- Kanpaku Sengen (関白宣言) (1979)
- Imperial Navy (連合艦隊) (1981)
- Saigo no Bakuto (最後の博徒) (1985)
- Hitohira no yuki (ひとひらの雪) (1985)
- Shiroi yabō (白い野望) (1986)
- Yogisha (夜汽車) (1987)
- Tokyo Blackout (首都消失) (1987)
- Tamba Tetsurou no Dai Reikai Shindara Dounaru (丹波哲郎の大霊界 死んだらどうなる) (1988)
- Tamba Tetsurou no Dai Reikai 2 Shindara Odoroita!! (丹波哲郎の大霊界2 死んだらおどろいた!!) (1990)
- Shuudan Sasen (集団左遷) (1994)
- Daisan no Gokudō (第三の極道) (1995)
- Nanba Kinyuu Den Minami no Teiou Gekijō Ban Part XII (難波金融伝ミナミの帝王 劇場版Part XII) (1998)
- Zenido 5 Mugen Rensa Kou (銭道5 無限連鎖講) (2004)
- Zenido 6 Jigoku no Saiken Kaishuu Saishuu Sho (銭道6 地獄の債権回収・最終章) (2005)

=== TV Dramas ===
- Asa no renzoku terebi shousetsu (朝の連続テレビ小説) (1975 NHK)
- G-Men '75 (Gメン'75) (1975 TBS)
- J.A.K.Q. Dengekitai (ジャッカー電撃隊) (1977 ANB) - Goroh Sakurai / Spade Ace
- Dorama ningen moyou (ドラマ人間模様) (1978 NHK)
- Ginga terebi shousetsu (銀河テレビ小説) (1979 NHK)
- Shura no tabi shite (修羅の旅して) (1979 NHK)
- Irashaimase!(1980 KTV)
- Kuusou kazoku (空想家族) (1979 ABC)
- Mi mawase ba ni nin (見まわせば二人) (1981 NTV)
- 3 nen B gumi nuki hachi sensei (3年B組貫八先生) (1982 TBS)
- Torusō saizensen (特捜最前線 第393話「オレンジ色の傘の女!」) (1984 ANB)
- Sanada Taiheiki (真田太平記) (1985 NHK)
- Hissatsu Shigotonin V (必殺仕事人V 第19話「加代、天才男と商売する」) (1985 ABC)
- Oyoge! Dai 5 koosu (泳げ!第5コース) (1986 KTV)
- Hissatsu Shigotonin V Senpuhen (必殺仕事人V・旋風編 第3話「主水、殺人ツアーに出かける」) (1986 ABC)
- Sengoku saigo no shouri sha! (戦国最後の勝利者!・徳川家康) (1987)
- Chotto ki ni naru yome (ちょっと気になる嫁) (1987 CBC)
- Kumogiri ni zaemon nagoyahen nusumareta hanayome (雲霧仁左衛門 名古屋編 盗まれた花嫁) (1987)
- Takeda Shingen (武田信玄) (1988 NHK)
- Ryouri koi monogatari (料理恋物語) (1988 TBS)
- Choujin keiji shuwacchi (超人刑事シュワッチ) (1990 TBS)
- Za keiji dai 8 wa (ザ・刑事 第8話「ロス疑惑!ディスコに消えた美少女」) (1990)
- Sasurai keiji ryojou hen III dai 5 wa (さすらい刑事旅情編III 第5話「ツイてない男・愛犬が暴く完全犯罪」) (1990 ANB)
- Bitoku no yoromeki (美徳のよろめき) (1993 TX)
- Shinkansen monogatari '93 natsu (新幹線物語'93夏) (1997 TBS)
- Captain Tsubasa (キャプテン翼) (1994 NHK)
- Hashiranka! (走らんか!) (1995 NHK)
- Shima kaeru kokyou no haha ni ai tai (島帰る 故郷の母に会いたい) (1995 NHK)
- Tokugawa kengouden sorekara no musashi (徳川剣豪伝 それからの武蔵) (1996 TX)
- Shinkansen '97 koi monogatari (新幹線'97恋物語) (1997 TBS)
- Aoi Tokugawa Sandai (葵徳川三代) (2000 NHK), Sakai Tadakatsu
- Haregi, koko ichiban (晴れ着、ここ一番) (2000 NHK)
- Youchien geemu 2 shataku hen (幼稚園ゲーム2 社宅編) (2002 CBC)
- Jikuu keisatsu 2 (時空警察2) (2002 NTV)
- musashi MUSASHI (武蔵 MUSASHI) (2003 NHK)
- Shinkizzu u (新キッズ・ウォー) (2005 CBC)
