= J.A.K.Q. Dengekitai =

Japanese television show

- Title screen
- Genre: Tokusatsu; superhero fiction; science fiction; crime fiction
- Created by: Shotaro Ishinomori
- Developed by: Shozo Uehara
- Directed by: Koichi Takemoto
- Starring: Yoshitaka Tamba; Shichiro Gou; Mitchi Love; Yuusuke Kazato; Hiroshi Miyauchi; Masashi Ishibashi
- Narrated by: Toru Ohira
- Music by: Michiaki Watanabe
- Country of origin: Japan
- No. of episodes: 35 (list of episodes)

Production
- Producers: Takafumi Hagino; Susumu Yoshikawa
- Running time: 30 minutes
- Production companies: Ishimori Productions; Toei Company; TV Asahi

Original release
- Network: ANN (TV Asahi)
- Release: 9 April – 24 December 1977

Related
- Himitsu Sentai Gorenger; Battle Fever J

J.A.K.Q. Dengekitai (ジャッカー電撃隊, Jakkā Dengekitai; J.A.K.Q. Electric Shock Team), (Note: Pronounced "Jacker".) is a 1977 Japanese television tokusatsu series broadcast by TV Asahi. The series is the second installment of Super Sentai. Directed by Koichi Takemoto, it stars Yoshitaka Tamba, Shichiro Gou, Mitchi Love, Yuusuke Kazato, Hiroshi Miyauchi and Masashi Ishibashi. It aired from April 8 to December 23, 1977, replacing Himitsu Sentai Gorenger and itself being replaced by Battle Fever J. It marks the first appearance of a White Ranger in the franchise. Toei distributes the series internationally under the title The Jackers. The series was released in the Philippines under the title Lucky Aces.

== Synopsis ==
Iron Claw is the leader of a global criminal empire known as "Crime", which has a network of wealthy, influential sympathizers and employs an army of faceless, leather-masked thugs and cyborg assassins. It seeks to become the most powerful mafia organization in the world.

To combat the threat of Crime, the International Science Special Investigation Squad (国際科学特捜隊, Kokusai Kagaku Tokusō Tai; ISSIS) is formed. The focus of the series is ISSIS' battles against Crime in Tokyo and Japan.

Tokyo's ISSIS branch commander, Daisuke Kujirai, proposes a radical experiment. Taking the code name "Joker", he recruits four young test subjects to undergo his cyborg enhancement project: Goro Sakurai, a multi-talented athlete and Olympic Gold medalist; Ryu Higashi, a disgraced boxing champion; Karen Mizuki, a policewoman who has been critically injured; and Bunta Daichi, an oceanographer who is clinically dead and is being cryogenically sustained. All four are surgically altered and given various bionic enhancements as well as energy manipulation powers. They are given the code name J.A.K.Q. Dengekitai, or J.A.K.Q (pronounced "Jacker"), and the mission to destroy Crime. Later in the series Joker leaves to head ISSIS' advanced engineering branch, and Sokichi Banba, a master of disguise and a cyborg, becomes their new boss, known as Big One.

== Characters ==
=== J.A.K.Q. ===
==== Goro Sakurai ====
Goro Sakurai (桜井 五郎, Sakurai Gorō) was a Japanese pentathlon athlete and Olympic Gold Medalist, a champion in karate, archery, and judo, a skilled equestrian, and a top all-around athlete. He initially turned down Joker's offer to join J.A.K.Q. but changed his heart when he saved Karen Mizuki (later Heart Queen). Goro and Karen become romantically involved towards the end of the series.

Goro's bionic enhancements allow him to manipulate atomic energy in various ways. He can see through walls and other barriers using X-ray vision (his Chu Seishi [Neutron] Scope), move at super speed (using his Kosouku [Acceleration] Switch), and hear distant sounds (using his Enkaku Shuon Souchi [Ultra Sound Device]). As the red-colored Spade Ace (スペードエース, Supēdo Ēsu), he wields several specially designed weapons, particularly his Spade Arts (スペードアーツ, Supēdo Atsu) bow. With this bow, Goro is able to shoot "atomic charged" arrows that puncture and bore through most substances. The Spade Arts bow could also be converted into a whip for binding an opponent. Goro is also a powerful fighter.

Goro is a born leader and uses his abilities to seek out his enemies' weak points.

Goro appeared in the movie Hyakujuu Sentai Gaoranger vs. Super Sentai, a movie made to celebrate the 25th anniversary of the Super Sentai metaseries, leading 24 Red Rangers to help inspire the Gaoranger team.

==== Karen Mizuki ====
Karen Mizuki (水木カレン, Mizuki Karen) is a Japanese-American female police detective who was assigned to investigate the routes used to traffic illegal narcotics into Japan. During one of her investigations, she uncovered the fact that Crime controlled a majority of these routes, and decided to assist ISSIS in destroying them. Crime attempted to kill Karen by arranging a fatal car accident. Karen survived the accident but lost her right arm. Her father, a fellow police officer, was killed in the crash. Enraged and seeking revenge, Karen willingly accepted Joker's offer to undergo the bionic process and join J.A.K.Q.

Karen's bionic enhancements allow her to control magnetism. She named her magnetism-based powers "Heart Cute Jiryoku [Magnet] Power". As the pink-colored Heart Queen (ハートクイン, Hāto Kuin), her powers allow her to attract and repel metallic objects at will, literally stopping bullets in mid-air. Her powers are further augmented by using her Q-shaped Heart Cute (ハートキュート, Hāto Kyūto) weapon. Using the Heart Cute, Karen can send out waves of magnetic energy that can bowl over opponents or force them into erratic behaviors. She takes pleasure in this, asking afterward "Do you want another?" (もう一つ、いかが?, "Mō hitotsu, ikaga?")). The Heart Cute can also be used as a blunt instrument to strike opponents. Her right index finger carries her "Magnetic Counter". This sends out a magnetic detection pulse, which she can then use to pinpoint and identify objects (both metal and organic) in a way similar to radar.

Karen is a skilled martial artist and is proficient in a number of fighting methods. She was temporarily part of the Kono Karate School where she befriended Natsuko Kono (Etsuko Shihomi), also a skilled martial artist. She has a flair for fashion and often sports tight red leather hotpants and long red boots. She falls in love with Goro towards the end of the series.

==== Ryu Higashi ====
Ryu Higashi (東 竜, Higashi Ryū) was the former WBC welterweight boxing champion. He was falsely accused of murder by boxing promoters in Las Vegas when he refused to rig a championship fight. Joker intercepted him when he was being extradited to Japan for prosecution, and asked him to choose between working for ISSIS as part of J.A.K.Q. or serving his prison sentence. Ryu reluctantly accepted Joker's offer.

Ryu's bionic enhancements allow him to manipulate electric currents. His right index finger carries a powerful cutter (Eleki [Electric] Cutter), which he uses to cut through dense objects. His left ring finger carries a laser beam (Dia Laser) that shears through most materials. As the blue-colored Dia Jack (ダイヤジャック, Daiya Jakku), Ryu wields the powerful Dia Sword (ダイヤソード, Daiya Sōdo), which he can imbue with his electrical powers to strike the enemy with deadly effect. The sword can slash and cut through solid steel and other dense metals. It can also be used to focus and fire electrical bolts of energy.

Ryu is a rough and gruff individual who is at times very headstrong and tends to prefer working alone. He continues to keep in touch with his former boxing partners, and loves jazz and fast cars.

==== Bunta Daichi ====
Bunta Daichi (大地 文太, Daichi Bunta) is an oceanographer who died of oxygen deprivation in a freak submarine accident. He lost his beloved younger sister Nami years earlier in an airplane crash. Bunta's body was cryogenically sustained in a medical facility for research until Joker found him. Using bionic technology, Joker revived Bunta as a cyborg.

Bunta's bionic enhancements allow him to manipulate gravitational forces. He can gain superhuman strength by increasing his body weight and density. When his power is cycling in the range of 700 horsepower, he can use his "Juroku [Superpower] Energy" to punch and kick opponents with devastating effect. As the green-colored Clover King (クローバーキング, Kurōbā Kingu), Bunta can throw opponents across great distances with his Juroku Nage (Power Throw) and can take down dozens of opponents with his King Power Press (キングパワープレス, Kingu Pawā Puresu) (a flying jump attack). His left hand can be converted into the Club Megaton (クラブメガトン, Kurabu Megaton), a ball and chain that can be used to strike and hit enemies or to bind them.

==== Sokichi Banba ====
Sokichi Banba (番場 壮吉, Banba Sōkichi) is a cyborg, a flamboyant playboy, and a master of disguise. He helped Joker implement the J.A.K.Q. project and was called in to take over operations in Tokyo when Joker left. As the white-colored Big One (ビッグワン, Biggu Wan), he is the ultimate "super cyborg" because his bionic implants allow him to harness and manipulate all four powers (atomic, magnetic, electric, and gravity). His nickname is the "White Flying Ace" (白い鳥人, Shiroi Chojin).

Sokichi can use his powers to fly and has superhuman speed and strength. He also wields the Big Baton (ビッグバトン, Biggu Baton), which he uses to strike opponents with great force and impact. Sokichi is a cool-headed leader and masterful tactician who can come up with brilliant battle plans. He can transform into his cyborg persona at will without the use of the Kyouka Capsules: he takes a sniff of a magic red rose, then leaps up and transforms in mid-air.

Twenty-four years after the fall of Crime, Sokichi returned in Hyakujuu Sentai Gaoranger vs. Super Sentai as the leader of the "Dream Sentai" team.

==== Commander Daisuke Kujirai ====
Daisuke Kujirai (鯨井 大助, Kujirai Daisuke), codenamed Joker (ジョーカー, Jōkā), is the recruiter of the J.A.K.Q team and their manager for most of the series. He is married and has a young daughter.

=== Criminal Organization Crime ===
The global Criminal Organization Crime (犯罪組織クライム, Hanzai Soshiki Kuraimu) is headed by the mysterious Iron Claw. It seeks to become the world's premier crime organization. In each episode of the series, Crime launches spectacular and elaborate schemes to loot, kill, plunder and obtain absolute power. It is later revealed that Crime is a cover organization for an alien entity called Shine, who sought to conquer the world.

==== Boss Iron Claw ====
Boss Iron Claw (首領アイアンクロー, Shuryō Aian Kurō) is the godfather of the Crime organization. He is oddly dressed and nothing is known about him including his nationality. He appears human but was later revealed to be a cyborg like the members of J.A.K.Q. His right hand is a powerful "Iron Claw", which fires talon-like missiles and can detach from Iron Claw's body to attack enemies independently. Iron Claw is a master of disguise, often masquerading as a female. He is a longtime rival of Big One, and the two of them have clashed at various times in the past.

==== Shine ====
Shine (シャイン, Shain) is revealed to be the real mastermind behind Crime towards the end of the series. A mysterious entity who is said to have come from the 2nd star of the "Shine" Galaxy, he attempted to use Crime to take over the Earth. Shine created the super cyborg Great King Icarus (イカルス大王, Ikarusu Daiō) to take control of Crime from Iron Claw and to battle J.A.K.Q. In the final battle between the J.A.K.Q. and Crime, he was revealed to be an artificial intelligence and was driven out to space after Spade Ace and Heart Queen exposed his true identity.

==== Crime Big Four ====
The Crime Big Four (クライム四天王, Kuraimu Shiten'ō) are a quartet of ruthless mercenaries and despots who joined forces with Iron Claw to wreak havoc across the globe. Their headquarters is a gigantic UFO that can fly around the world undetected. They have battled with other heroes across the globe including Kikaider, Kamen Rider V3, and Kamen Rider Amazon. Each member of the Crime Big Four has their own army of specialized troops. The Crime Big Four can combine to form the monstrous hulking cyborg Big Four Robo (四天王ロボ, Shiten'ō Robo) which was later destroyed by J.A.K.Q.'s Big Bomber and Gorenger's Gorenger Hurricane Ball.

==== Crime Bosses ====
The Crime Bossses (犯罪ボス, Hanzai bosu) are humans that operate under Boss Iron Claw. Each one has their own territory where a few of them have been named for the territory they run while the others were left unnamed. They were later phased out when Shine and the Invader Robots came into view.

==== Crimers ====
Crimers (クライマー, Kuraimā) are the minions of the Crime organization when working under Boss Iron Claw or the Crime Bosses. Their objective is to commit as many crimes as possible to advance Crime's goal of turning Japan into a crime-ridden nation. They wear dark purple masks and gray clothing and wield Sten Mark II submachine guns. Their distinct sound is "kwee".

==== Mechanical Monsters ====
The Mechanical Monsters (機械モンスター, Kikai Monsutā) are a group of robots that are used by Criminal Organization Crime. Each of them are assigned to the different crime bosses.

- Devil Killer (デビルキラー, Debiru Kira): A devil/saw-themed Mechanical Monster that worked for the Tokyo Boss.
- Devil Drill (デビルドリル, Debiru Doriru): A drill-themed Mechanical Monster that worked for the Tokyo Boss.
- Devil Mite (デビルマイト, Debiru Maito): A dynamite-themed Mechanical Monster.
- Devil Gun (デビルガン, Debiru Gan): A handgun-themed Mechanical Monster.
- Devil Wrestler (デビルレスラー, Debiru Resura): A wrestler-themed Mechanical Monster.
- Devil Amazon (デビルアマゾン, Debiru Amazon): An Amazon-themed Mechanical Monster that worked for Crime Boss Tomioka.
- Devil Electric (デビルエレキ, Debiru Ereki): An electrode-themed Mechanical Monster.
- Devil Flower (デビルフラワー, Debiru Furawā): A flower-themed Mechanical Monster.
- Devil Spider (デビルスパイダー, Debiru Supaida): A spider-themed Mechanical Monster.
- Devil Cane (デビルケーン, Debiru Keen): An armour-themed Mechanical Monster.
- Devil Gang (デビルギャング, Debiru Gyangu): A Yakuza gangster-themed Mechanical Monster.
- Devil Sphinx (デビルスフィンクス, Debiru Sufinkusu): A sphinx-themed Mechanical Monster.
- Devil Goo (デビルグー, Debiru Guu): A fist-themed Mechanical Monster.
- Devil Wolf (デビルウルフ, Debiru Urufu): A wolf-themed Mechanical Monster.
- Devil Mummy (デビルミイラ, Debiru Miira): A mummy-themed Mechanical Monster.
- Devil Ball (デビルボール, Debiru Bōru): A baseball-themed Mechanical Monster.
- Devil Devil (デビルアクマ, Debiru Akuma): A devil-themed Mechanical Monster.
- Devil Fishing (デビルフィッシング, Debiru Fisshingu): A fish-themed Mechanical Monster.
- Devil Athletic ((デビルアスレチック, Debiru Asurechikku): An Oni-themed Mechanical Monster.
- Devil BEM (デビルベム, Debiru Bemu): A bug-eyed monster-themed Mechanical Monster.
- Devil Batter (デビルバッター, Debiru Battā): A baseball player-themed Mechanical Monster.
- Devil Scrap (デビルスクラップ, Debiru Sukurappu): A scrap-themed Mechanical Monster.

==== Invader Robots ====
The Invader Robots (侵略ロボット, Shinryaku Robotto) are a group of alien cyborgs that are used by Criminal Organization Crime when Shine came into view.

- Atomic Witch (アトミック魔女, Atomikku Majō): A witch-themed Invader Robot.
- Hell's Angel (地獄天使, Jigoku Tenshi): A magician-themed Invader Robot.
- General Antongam (アリンガム将軍, Aringamu Shōgun): An ant-themed Invader Robot.
- Captain Ghost (キャプテンゴースト, Kyaputen Gōsuto): A pirate-themed Invader Robot.
- Führer Crocodile (クロコダイル総統, Kurokodairu Sōtō): A crocodile/Führer-themed Invader Robot.
- Tentacles Lay Priest (テンタクルズ入道, Tentakuruzu Nyūdō): An octopus/priest-themed Invader Robot.
- Chief Mantis (カマキリ大酋長, Kamakiri Daishūchō): A mantis-themed Invader Robot.
- Great Priest Cobra (コブラ大神官, Kobura Daishinkan): A cobra-themed Invader Robot.
- Shachira Khan (シャチラ汗, Shachira Kan): An orca-themed Invader Robot.
- Battalion Leader Chameleon (カメレアン大隊長, Kamerean Daitaichō): A chameleon-themed Invader Robot.
- Admiral Buffalo (バッファロー提督, Baffaroo Teitoku): A water buffalo-themed Invader Robot.
- Great King Icarus (イカルス大王, Ikarusu Daiō): A squid-themed Invader Robot.

== Episodes ==
| No. | Title | Directed by | Written by | Original release date | Ratings |
|---|---|---|---|---|---|
| 1 | "4 Cards!! The Trump is J.A.K.Q."; Transliteration: "Fō Kādo!! Kirifuda wa Jakkā" (Japanese: 4カード!! 切り札はJAKQ) | Kōichi Takemoto | Shōzō Uehara | 9 April 1977 | 13.6 |
| 2 | "2 Ten-Jacks!! Destroy the Secret Factory"; Transliteration: "Tsū Ten Jakku!! Himitsu Kōjō o Hakai Seyo" (Japanese: 2テンジャック!! 秘密工場を電撃せよ) | Kōichi Takemoto | Shōzō Uehara | 16 April 1977 | 12.1 |
| 3 | "5 Flashes!! Roar, Panther"; Transliteration: "Faibu Furasshu!! Hoero Pansā" (Japanese: 5フラッシュ!! ほえろパンサー) | Atsuo Okunaka | Shōzō Uehara | 23 April 1977 | 12.8 |
| 4 | "1 Joker!! Blind Spot in the Perfect Crime"; Transliteration: "Wan Jōkā!! Kanzen Hanzai no Shikaku" (Japanese: 1ジョーカー!! 完全犯罪の死角) | Atsuo Okunaka | Shōzō Uehara | 30 April 1977 | 12.3 |
| 5 | "3 Snaps!! The Ballad of Betrayal"; Transliteration: "Surī Sunappu!! Uragiri no Barādo" (Japanese: 3スナップ!! 裏切りのバラード) | Kōichi Takemoto | Shōzō Uehara | 7 May 1977 | 13.3 |
| 6 | "9 Pokers!! The Beauty's Trap"; Transliteration: "Nain Pōkā!! Bijo no Wana" (Japanese: 9ポーカー!! 美女の罠) | Kōichi Takemoto | Kuniaki Oshikawa | 14 May 1977 | 11.1 |
| 7 | "8 Supercars!! Super-Speed, 350 km/h" Transliteration: "Eito Sūpākā!! Chōsoku Sanbyaku Gojū Kiro" (Japanese: 8スーパーカー!! 超速300キロ) | Atsuo Okunaka | Shōzō Uehara | 21 May 1977 | 11.5 |
| 8 | "6 Targets!! Exploding Flowers"; Transliteration: "Shikkusu Tāgetto!! Bakuhatsu Suru Hana" (Japanese: 6ターゲット!! 爆発する花) | Atsuo Okunaka | Kuniaki Oshikawa | 28 May 1977 | 9.3 |
| 9 | "7 Straights!! The Deadly Fist of Hell"; Transliteration: "Sebun Sutorēto!! Jigoku no Hissatsu Ken" (Japanese: 7ストレート!! 地獄の必殺拳) | Kōichi Takemoto | Shōzō Uehara | 4 June 1977 | 10.1 |
| 10 | "11 Collections!! Invitation to Happiness"; Transliteration: "Irebun Korekushon!! Kōfuku e no Shōtai" (Japanese: 11コレクション!! 幸福への招待) | Kōichi Takemoto | Hirohisa Soda | 18 June 1977 | 11.4 |
| 11 | "13 Jackpots!! Burn! Flames of Friendship"; Transliteration: "Sātīn Jakkupotto!! Moe yo! Yūjō no Honō" (Japanese: 13ジャックポット!! 燃えよ! 友情の炎) | Atsuo Okunaka | Susumu Takaku & Hikaru Arai | 25 June 1977 | 11.7 |
| 12 | "10 Pyramids!! The Maze of the Golden Mask"; Transliteration: "Ten Piramiddo!! Ōgon Kamen no Meiro" (Japanese: 10ピラミッド!! 黄金仮面の迷路) | Atsuo Okunaka | Shōzō Uehara | 2 July 1977 | 7.6 |
| 13 | "Blue Key Quiz!! The Riddle of the Secret Room Murder"; Transliteration: "Aoi Kī Kuizu!! Misshitsu Satsujin no Nazo – Nazo" (Japanese: 青いキークイズ!! 密室殺人の謎・なぞ) | Kimio Hirayama | Shōzō Uehara | 9 July 1977 | 8.7 |
| 14 | "All Supercars!! Violence!! Great Violent Dash!!"; Transliteration: "Ōru Sūpākā!! Mōretsu!! Dai Gekisō!!" (Japanese: オールスーパーカー!! 猛烈!! 大激走!!) | Kimio Hirayama | Kimio Hirayama | 16 July 1977 | 8.1 |
| 15 | "The Crimson Occult!! Ghost Story – Vampire"; Transliteration: "Makka na Okaruto!! Kaidan – Kyūketsuki" (Japanese: 真赤なオカルト!! 怪談・吸血鬼) | Atsuo Okunaka | Shōzō Uehara | 23 July 1977 | 5.5 |
| 16 | "Black Baseball!! The Attacking Miracle Ball"; Transliteration: "Kuroi Bēsubōru!! Shūgeki Suru Makyū" (Japanese: 黒いベースボール!! 襲撃する魔球) | Atsuo Okunaka | Shōzō Uehara | 30 July 1977 | 8.2 |
| 17 | "Black Demonic Possession!! Ghost Story – Hell House"; Transliteration: "Kuroi Akuma Tsuki!! Kaidan – Jigoku no Ie" (Japanese: 黒い悪魔つき!! 怪談・地獄の家) | Kōichi Takemoto | Shōzō Uehara | 6 August 1977 | 7.5 |
| 18 | "Blue Whirling Tides!! The Face of the Secret Spy"; Transliteration: "Aoi Uzushio!! Himitsu Supai no Kao" (Japanese: 青いうず潮!! 秘密スパイの顔) | Kōichi Takemoto | Shōzō Uehara | 13 August 1977 | 7.9 |
| 19 | "Great Crimson Adventure!! Demon Extermination of Bottomless Haunts"; Transliteration: "Makka na Daibōken!! Sokonashi Makyō no Oni Taiji" (Japanese: 真赤な大冒険!! 底なし魔境の鬼退治) | Kimio Hirayama | Shōzō Uehara | 20 August 1977 | 8.8 |
| 20 | "Messenger of Darkness!! The Transparent Monster Runs the Darkness"; Transliteration: "Ankoku no Shisha!! Tōmei Kaibutsu ga Yami o Hashiru" (Japanese: 暗黒の使者!! 透明怪物が闇を走る) | Kimio Hirayama | Kuniaki Oshikawa | 27 August 1977 | 7.6 |
| 21 | "The Rose-Colored Baseball Era!! CRIME's Slugger"; Transliteration: "Bara-iro no Yakyū Jidai!! Kuraimu no Kyōdasha" (Japanese: バラ色の野球時代!! クライムの強打者) | Kōichi Takemoto | Shōzō Uehara | 3 September 1977 | 10.7 |
| 22 | "Big Red Counterattack!! Attack the Suicide Bomber Army"; Transliteration: "Akai Dai Gyakuten!! Jibaku Gundan o Kōgeki Seyo" (Japanese: 赤い大逆転! 自爆軍団を攻撃せよ) | Kōichi Takemoto | Hikaru Arai | 10 September 1977 | 7.6 |
| 23 | "White Birdman! Big One"; Transliteration: "Shiroi Chōjin! Biggu Wan" (Japanese: 白い鳥人! ビッグワン) | Kōichi Takemoto | Shōzō Uehara | 1 October 1977 | 8.6 |
| 24 | "Demon? Angel?! The Marvelous Flute-Playing Man"; Transliteration: "Akuma ka? Tenshi ka?! Fushigi na Fuefuki Otoko" (Japanese: 悪魔か? 天使か?! 不思議な笛吹き男) | Kōichi Takemoto | Shōzō Uehara | 8 October 1977 | 11.5 |
| 25 | "Victory? Death?! Demon Shogun and the Mechanization Army"; Transliteration: "Shōri ka? Shi ka?! Oni Shōgun to Kikaika Gundan" (Japanese: 勝利か? 死か?! 鬼将軍と機械化軍団) | Katsuhiko Taguchi | Shōzō Uehara | 15 October 1977 | 8.3 |
| 26 | "Invaders!? The Mysterious Space Pirate Ship"; Transliteration: "Inbēdā ka!? Nazo no Uchū Kaizokusen" (Japanese: インベーダーか!? 謎の宇宙海賊船) | Katsuhiko Taguchi | Shōzō Uehara | 22 October 1977 | 9.5 |
| 27 | "The Despot's Ambition!! Break it! The Death Camp"; Transliteration: "Dokusaisha no Yabō!! Kudake! Shi no Shūyōjo" (Japanese: 独裁者の野望!! 砕け! 死の収容所) | Kōichi Takemoto | Shōzō Uehara | 29 October 1977 | 12.3 |
| 28 | "My Secret! A Space Monster in My Pocket"; Transliteration: "Boku no Himitsu! Poketto no Naka no Uchū Kaibutsu" (Japanese: ぼくの秘密! ポケットの中の宇宙怪物) | Kōichi Takemoto | Shōzō Uehara | 5 November 1977 | 11.2 |
| 29 | "Go, Seven Changes! Iron Claw vs. Big One"; Transliteration: "Yuku zo Shichi Henge! Aian Kurō Tai Biggu Wan" (Japanese: 行くぞ七変化! 鉄の爪対ビッグワン) | Minoru Yamada | Shōzō Uehara | 12 November 1977 | 10.8 |
| 30 | "The Code That Calls Death! Deadly Poison, Cobra Twist"; Transliteration: "Shi o Yobu Angō! Mōdoku Kobura Tsuisuto" (Japanese: 死を呼ぶ暗号! 猛毒コブラツイスト) | Minoru Yamada | Shōzō Uehara | 19 November 1977 | 10.2 |
| 31 | "Red Impact! The Spy Is a Fourth-Grader"; Transliteration: "Akai Shōgeki! Supai wa Shōgaku Yonensei" (Japanese: 赤い衝撃! スパイは小学四年生) | Kōichi Takemoto | Shōzō Uehara | 26 November 1977 | 7.8 |
| 32 | "Which is the Real One?! Danger, Big One"; Transliteration: "Dotchi ga Honmono?! Ayaushi Biggu Wan" (Japanese: どっちが本もの?! 危うしビッグワン) | Kōichi Takemoto | Shūkei Nagasaka | 3 December 1977 | 8.9 |
| 33 | "The Blitzkrieg Squad Annihilated?! CRIME's Cooking Class"; Transliteration: "Dengekitai Zenmetsu ka?! Kuraimu no Oryōri Kyōshitsu" (Japanese: 電撃隊全滅か?! クライムのお料理教室) | Minoru Yamada | Kuniaki Oshikawa | 10 December 1977 | 8.8 |
| 34 | "Infiltration! CRIME Fortress Island"; Transliteration: "Sennyū! Kuraimu Yōsai Tō" (Japanese: 潜入! クライム要塞島) | Minoru Yamada | Shōzō Uehara | 17 December 1977 | 7.4 |
| 35 (Final) | "Big Victory! Farewell, J.A.K.Q."; Transliteration: "Daishōri! Saraba Jakkā" (Japanese: 大勝利! さらばジャッカー) | Minoru Yamada | Shōzō Uehara | 24 December 1977 | 8.6 |

== Film ==
- J.A.K.Q. Dengekitai (movie version of episode 7) (Release date 17 July 1977)

=== J.A.K.Q. vs. Gorenger ===
Directed by Katsuhiko Taguchi, Written by Shōzō Uehara and Released on March 18, 1978 The movie J.A.K.Q. Dengekitai vs. Gorenger (ジャッカー電撃隊VSゴレンジャー, Jakkā Dengekitai VS Gorenjā) was released after the conclusion of the J.A.K.Q. Dengekitai series and featured a crossover between J.A.K.Q. and the Gorengers.

While investigating a UFO in the Sky Ace, J.A.K.Q. is caught off guard by the return of Iron Claw, with the Big Four now leading the remnants of Crime and the Black Cross Army. The next day, while arriving on the scene of a washed-up corpse, Heart Queen and Spade Ace encounter Peggy Matsuyama (Momo Ranger from the Gorengers), who has pursued the Sahara Army to Japan. After Matsuyama reveals markings on the murdered man's back, J.A.K.Q. learns of Crime's "Citybuster" project and the location of the syndicate's island base.

After infiltrating Crime's base, Spade Ace and Heart Queen learn of Iron Claw's plan to use the "Citybuster" bombs on the United States, the Soviet Union, China, France, the United Kingdom, West Germany and Japan, wiping out humanity while he and his forces retreat into space via a UFO before returning to Earth and conquering it. After saving Matsuyama, Spade Ace and Heart Queen escape the base but are surrounded by the Big Four and their armies. Clover King, Dia Jack and the rest of the Gorengers appear and save them. Together, the teams go on to defeat the Crime and Black Cross armies.

The Big Four combine to form the super cyborg "Big Four Robo", who overwhelms both teams until Big One arrives and J.A.K.Q. and the Gorengers combine their attacks to destroy it. Iron Claw then retreats to his UFO and begins to activate the "Citybuster" bombs until his UFO self-destructs, finishing him off for good. It turns out that Big One switched Iron Claw's hand with a remote controlled one that Spade Ace used to detonate the "Citybuster" bombs, destroying the craft and Iron Claw with it.

== Cast ==
- Goro Sakurai / Spade Ace: Yoshitaka Tamba
- Karen Mizuki / Heart Queen: Mitchi Love
- Ryu Higashi / Diamond Jack: Shichiro Gou
- Bunta Daichi / Club King: Yuusuke Kazato
- Sokichi Banba / The Big One / Joker II: Hiroshi Miyauchi
- Commander Daisuke Kujirai / Joker I: Daisuke Kujirai
- Iron Claw: Masashi Ishibashi
- Narrator: Toru Ohira

=== Guest stars ===
- Keiji Mizuki (Karen's father) (1): Jun Todo
- Captain Robert (1): Ousmane Yusef
- ISSIS soldiers (1): Jyunichi Haruta, Yutaro Osugi
- Keiji (1)/Katsuya's brother (9): Toshimichi Takahashi
- Police officer (at airport) (1): Nenji Kobayashi
- Crime Boss' Tokyo (1 & 2): Junji Masuda
- Yamauchi (Ryu's boxing master) (2): Takeshi Omaeda
- Sam (2): Jim Max Baden
- Crime Boss' Yokohama (3 & 4): Yoshikazu Sugi
- Hayato Kono (3): Kenji Ohba (credit as Kenji Takahashi)
- Natsuki Kono (3): Etsuko Shihomi
- Nami Daichi (Bunta's sister) (4): Terumi Sato
- Emi Nishizaki (4): Takako Ishikawa
- Emi's Father (4): Tsuyoshi Shintaku
- Emi's Mother (4): Mari Nakamura
- Crime Boss #3 (5): Kenji Ushio
- Junko Koyama (5): Yōko Natsuki
- Dr. Koyama (Junko's Father and Kujirai's teacher) (5): Hiroshi Katayama
- Crime Boss Tomioka (6): Makoto Takagiri
- Devil Amazon's Human Form (6): Rena Natsuki
- Himself (7 & 14): Toru Kirikae
- Herself (7): Masako Kirikae
- Crime Boss #5 (8): Fumitake Omura
- Kumiko (Karen's closest friend) (8): Kyoko Okada
- Kanako Mizuki (Butique's owner and Karen's mother) (8): Mieko Muramatsu
- Katsuya Nakayama (9): Hiroyuki Sanada
- Big Saturn (9): Willie Dorsey
- Crime Boss #6 (9): Shinji Takano
- Miki Ota (10): Megumi Shimizu
- Henry Ota (10): Shuntaro Emi
- Akao (10): Tomokazu Hokuto
- Crime Boss #7 (10): Koji Miemachi
- Wakamiya (11): Koki Tanioka
- Crime Boss #8 (Dr. Fujita) (11): Takashi Toyama
- Crime Boss #9 (12): Susumu Kurobe
- Crime Boss #10 (Jan Muto) (13): Kazuo Arai
- Ryuichi Iwasaki (13): Kenichi Mochizuki
- Tamiko Hayashida (13): Eriko Hama
- Reika (13): Keiko Shimizu
- Bourne (14): David Friedman
- Himself (14): Makoto Kaneko
- Maya (14): Ritsuko Fujiyama
- Crime Boss (008) (14): Eiichi Kikuchi
- Crime Boss #11 (15): Chikako Susumu
- Megumi (15): Yumi Tamai
- Kenta (15): Fumihiko Ogawa
- Sachiko Suzuki (15): Fumiyo Shigeno
- Female Member nº 7 (15): Rumi Kudo
- Crime Boss #12 (16): Nobuo Yana
- Jiro Kanai (16): Hisashi Kubota
- Misako Akizuki (17): Yuriko Izuka
- Crime Boss #13 (Misako's Uncle) (17): Koji Kawamura
- Ryoji Sada (18): Mutsumi Okabe
- Ryochi Sada (Ryoji's Brother and Crime's Spy) (18): Koichi Okabe
- Crime Boss #14 (18): Keisuke Nakai
- Coronel Gamudi (20): Kentaro Kaji
- Princess Cindy (20): Mayo Suzuki
- Crime Boss #15 (20): Kin Oomae
- Mr. Shin (22): Shin Misuta
- Director Hosoda (Atomic Witch's human form) (23): Akiko Mori
- Hiker (25): Eisuke Yoda
- Fujita (27): Ken Sudo
- Isamu Nishikawa (28): Kazuto Ando
- Yukie Hamato (30): Sumiko Kakizaki
- Director Hamato (30): Yoshio Yoshida
- Shinta Yamamoto (31): Seiichi Ando
- Shinta's father (31): Tsuyoshi Soma
- Shinta's mother (31): Michiko Hoshi
- Suikan (31): Akira Oizumi
- Cooks (Admiral Buffalo's human form) (33): Tadashi Nakamura
- Kujirai's wife (35): Isuzu Igarashi
- Mari Kujirai (Kujirai's daughter) (35): Kumi Shimizu

== Songs ==
Opening theme

- "J.A.K.Q. Dengekitai" (ジャッカー電撃隊, Jakkā Dengekitai)
  - Lyrics: Shotaro Ishinomori
  - Composition and arrangement: Michiaki Watanabe
  - Artist: Isao Sasaki with Koorogi '73

Ending theme

- "Itsuka, Hana wa Saku Darō" (いつか、花は咲くだろう; "Someday, Flowers Will Bloom")
  - Lyrics: Saburō Yatsude
  - Composition and arrangement: Michiaki Watanabe
  - Artist: Isao Sasaki
