= Supercar Gattiger =

Japanese anime series

Chō Supercar Gattiger (Japanese: 超スーパーカーガッタイガー) is a TV anime that was broadcast by Tokyo 12 Channel (now TV Tokyo) from October 4, 1977 to March 28, 1978. The anime was co-produced by Eiwa and Nihon Keizai Advertising.

== Synopsis ==
F1 racer Joe Tabuchi becomes the driver of the powerful super car Gattiger, which is equipped with many abilities, such as a "solar energy engine" and participates in the racing team called "Team Tiger". The team battles the "Demon Clan" who killed his father, who developed the car.

== Characters ==
Joe Tabuchi

- Voice: Yu Mizushima
- The main driver of the Tiger team

Sachiyo Wakazuki

- Voice: Ai Sakuma

Katsumi Wakazuki

- Voice: Yasuto Sugawara

Ken Igarashi

- Voice: Saburo Kamei
- The driver of the End Machine, he is of Native American descent.

Hiroki Hayami

- Voice: Akira Murayama

Yuzo Wakazuki

- Voice: Jun Hasumi
- The doctor and engineer of the Tiger Team.

Demon Clan:

- Black Demon
- Voice: Kenichi Ogata

The leader of the Demon Clan, originally one of the world's richest men, turned into a villain whose destiny was the conquer the world.

== Broadcast in the United States ==
Around 1978, a handful of episodes were subtitled and broadcast on KTSF in San Francisco, California and other UHF stations in California. The subtitling and distrubuion was done by Space Joe Inc of Carson, California.

== Broadcast in Italy ==
In 1981, the series was translated into Italian. It was broadcast on local channels, the series would gain a more successful following than in Japan. A new theme song was made and also became popular. It was rebroadcast in 1992 on Italia 7.
