= Peter Foldes =

Hungarian-British director and animator

- Born: 22 August 1924; Budapest, Kingdom of Hungary
- Died: 29 March 1977 (aged 52); Paris, France
- Occupations: Film director, producer

Peter Foldes (22 August 1924 in Budapest – 29 March 1977 in Paris) was a Hungarian-British director and animator.

== Biography ==
Budapest-born Peter Foldes was one of a number of Hungarian artists (another was the film's composer Mátyás Seiber) who ended up working with fellow countryman John Halas on the latter's animated films after he moved to Britain in 1946. After leaving Halas, Foldes made a number of animated films in collaboration with his British wife Joan (b. 1924), starting with the allegorical Animated Genesis (1952), On Closer Inspection (1953) and A Short Vision (1956).

A Short Vision became one of the most influential British animated films ever made, when it was screened on US television as part of the popular Ed Sullivan Show. Although children were advised to leave the room while it played, it still caused outrage and alarm with its graphic representation of the horrors of nuclear war. In the film, wild creatures flee in terror as a strange missile flies overhead. As it passes over the sleeping city, the world's leaders and wise men look upwards. The missile explodes, destroying humans, wild creatures and the Earth itself. It caught the mood of the times, since the mid-1950s was the height of both the Cold War and nuclear paranoia.

Foldes later moved to Paris, where he became an early pioneer in computer animation. Foldes was one of the first animators to use the Tweening method. In the 1960s, he worked for the Research Service of the ORTF. He is one of the pioneers of computer animation with his film Hunger, which received the Jury Prize in the "short film" category at Cannes Film Festival as well as an Academy Award nomination for Best Animated Short Film at the 47th Academy Awards in 1975. In 1997, scientists Nestor Burtnyk and Marceli Wein earned an Academy Award for their technical achievement in computer animation with Foldes for their "pioneering work" on Hunger.

== Filmography ==
- 1952 : Animated genesis, animated short film
- 1953 : On Closer Inspection, animated short film
- 1956 : A Short Vision, animated short film
- 1964 : Appétit d'oiseau, animated short film
- 1965 : Un garçon plein d'avenir, animated short film
- 1965-1971 : Dim Dam Dom, television series
- 1966 : Plus vite, short film
- 1967 : Éveil, short film
- 1968 : La Belle cérébrale, short film
- 1969 : Je, tu, elles...
- 1971 : Metadata, animated short film
- 1971 : Narcissus-Echo, animated short film
- 1974 : Hunger, animated short film
- 1977 : Rêve, animated short film
- 1977 : Envisage, animated short film

== Paintings ==
- « Histo - Art N°1 », 1962, oil on canvas, 161 x 129 cm
