= Yoomi Tamai =

Japanese actress and singer

- 玉井 夕海
- Born: August 6, 1977 (age 49); Tokyo, Japan
- Education: Tokyo University of the Arts
- Occupations: Actress, singer
- Years active: 1999–present

Yoomi Tamai (玉井 夕海, Tamai Yūmi; born August 6, 1977), is a Japanese actress and singer from Tokyo. She is member of the performance group Psalm (SARM).

== Filmography ==
=== Drama ===
- Tomica Hero: Rescue Fire (2009)

=== Film ===
- Spirited Away (2001) as Rin
- Fuse Teppō Musume no Torimonochō (2012)

=== Anime ===
- Xam'd: Lost Memories (2008) as Ishuu Benikawa

== Discography ==
=== Studio albums ===
- 2006 - Shen Mont
- 2007 - Psalm for the trip
- 2008 - Redon implied

=== Singles ===
- Unno song
- Hikarinofune
- Psalm of the Sea
- To Uminbo
- Dark sky
