= Balatack =

Japanese anime television series

- Title card of the English dub
- 超人戦隊バラタック
- Genre: Mecha
- Created by: Shigeto Ikehara; Mayumi Kobayashi
- Written by: Hiroyasu Yamaura; Keisuke Fujikawa; Hiroyuki Hoshiyama; Toyohiro Andō
- Directed by: Nobutaka Nishizawa
- Music by: Akihiro Komori
- Country of origin: Japan
- Original language: Japanese
- No. of episodes: 31

Production
- Producer: Yūyake Usui (13-31)
- Production companies: TV Asahi; Toei Animation; Japad

Original release
- Network: ANN (TV Asahi)
- Release: 3 July 1977 – 26 March 1978

Balatack (超人戦隊バラタック, Chōjin Sentai Baratakku; Superhuman Squadron Barattack) is a Japanese mecha anime produced by Toei Animation, and is the final installment to Takara's Magne-Robo franchise. It follows the adventures of five teenagers as they fight against an evil alien force using the titular combining mecha, Barattack. The show aired on TV Asahi between 1977 and 1978.

The series is loosely related to Himitsu Sentai Gorenger and its sequel series JAKQ Dengekitai as the five main characters wear multicolored costumes. Unlike the sentai teams in the aforementioned series, they do not engage in hand-to-hand martial arts combat, only fighting in their combining mecha. All 31 episodes were released on three Region 2 DVD sets in Japan in March, April, and May 2010.
