= A Short Vision =

1956 animated horror film

The title card of A Short Vision.

A Short Vision is a British adult animated short film by Joan and Peter Foldes released in 1956. The film, inspired by one of Peter's poems, depicts the destruction of the world, including mankind. The film's music was composed by Mátyás Seiber, who composed music for Animal Farm two years earlier.

A Short Vision gained notoriety when it was shown on The Ed Sullivan Show on 27 May 1956. This, however, made it controversial. Due to popular demand, it was shown again on 10 June.

== Origins ==
A Short Vision was inspired by a poem composed by Peter Foldes while on a boat from Australia in October 1954. Peter was creative artist for the film, while his wife Joan was responsible for the animation stand, the lighting and some of the animation. The film was produced in the Foldes' kitchen. and was funded by the British Film Institute's Experimental Film Fund. The scheme also funded an earlier Foldes' animation entitled Animated Genesis about a society which is under threat from a tyrant.

== Synopsis ==
It, itself.

The film opens with a shot from a bedroom window. It pans to the sky as the narrator (James McKechnie) recalls the time he looked out his window. He saw an object flying through the sky. Throughout the film the object is only referred to as It. Although It (bearing an uncanny resemblance to the B-2 stealth bomber or black triangle UFO, though likely inspired by the YB-35 or YB-49) was very far away and seemed to move slowly, it came swiftly and was unnoticed. When It flew over the mountain, the leopard and the deer looked up. When they saw It, the deer ran free from the leopard's claws and they both hide in fear. When It flew over the fields, the owl and the rat looked up, and the rat ran free of the owl's claws and they both hide in fear.

When It flies over the city, everyone is asleep except for their leaders and their wise men, who all look up at It, but it is too late. It detonates, producing a mushroom cloud which engulfs the city, melting the eyes and flesh of the leaders, killing and destroying everything and everyone that has witnessed It. However, It also destroys the sleeping people and everyone else who have not seen It. It then engulfs the mountain and the fields, destroying them also. In the end, there is nothing left except a tiny flame. Then the narrator sees It flying around the flame like a moth, and then It, too is destroyed. Then, finally, the flame dies, leaving nothingness.

== The Ed Sullivan Show ==
The mushroom cloud produced by It.

Ed Sullivan saw A Short Vision in England, and promised an American showing. He said his motive was a "plea for peace". However, he may have shown it because of his relationship with George K. Arthur, A Short Vision's distributor. Ten days after he saw it, Sullivan showed A Short Vision on his popular Sunday night show The Ed Sullivan Show on 27 May 1956. Sullivan told the audience to tell their children in the room to not be alarmed, because of its animated nature. The film was very popular, and when it was shown again on 10 June, Sullivan told parents to take children out of the room.

Sullivan was incorrect when he said before the first showing that the film depicts the effects of a hydrogen bomb on an "animal population". The film avoids all modern references, and all animal and human life is destroyed. Sullivan may not have watched the entire film before broadcasting it on his show, since the start begins with a deer, a leopard, an owl, and a rat.

== See also ==
- A Short Vision (1956) on YouTube
