= Hunger (1974 film) =

1974 Canadian animated short film

Hunger/La Faim
- English opening title
- Directed by: Peter Foldes
- Cinematography: Richard Michaud, Alan Ward
- Music by: Pierre F. Brault
- Animation by: Nestor Burtnyk, Peter Foldes, Marceli Wein
- Distributed by: National Film Board of Canada
- Release date: 1974
- Running time: 11 minutes
- Country: Canada
- Language: No dialogue
- Budget: $38,893

Hunger/La Faim is a 1974 Canadian animated short film produced by the National Film Board of Canada. It was directed by Peter Foldes and is one of the first computer animation films. The story, told without words, is based on the consequences of gluttony and greed in contemporary society, which showcases a man's progression from slim and young to grotesque and obese.

Foldes developed a computer animation application in collaboration with the National Research Council Canada (NRC) in 1969. In addition, scientist Nestor Burtnyk worked as the short film's lead animator and wrote its computer program code, while physicist Marceli Wein programmed a "key frame animation" package to create animated sequences from key frames. Foldes wrote a proposal emphasized with metamorphosis and pitched it to René Jodoin, the head of NFB's French animation division at the time. Before its progression as a narrative short film, Foldes' produced the computer key frame-based experimental short film Metadata (1971).

Following the attention and reviews of Metadata, Foldes began production on Hunger, which emphasized Foldes' use of figurative drawing and politically charged themes. The short film used a 2D technique that allowed the use of object shape modification and line interpolation techniques, emphasizing its ability for line drawings to dissolve and reshape into various images. Hunger took a year and a half to complete and the music for the short film was composed by Pierre F. Brault.

Hunger received positive reviews for its innovative use of computer animation in a narrative form and won multiple international film awards throughout 1974 and 1975, including the Cannes Film Festival, Chicago International Film Festival, and 28th British Academy Film Awards. It was also nominated for Best Animated Short Film at the 47th Academy Awards the latter year. In 1997, Burtnyk and Wein received an Academy Award for Technical Achievement in computer animation for their "pioneering work" on Hunger.

== Plot ==
Hunger focuses on a slim, young man's progression into a grotesque, obese figure, as a morality tale based on the consequences of gluttony and greed in contemporary society.

The short film begins with a slim young man. He calls for food inaudibly, while his head duplicates from the same neck as he speaks into two telephones simultaneously. He then takes his hat and enters an elevator. As the lines of the background transform into an outdoor street, the man transforms into a car and drives to a delicatessen. Returning to human form, he examines the available food and orders several items before eating them.

The man later enters a restaurant and looks at the menu. He transforms into an image of himself seated at a reserved table, where a waitress appears. He orders a suckling pig, fish, and turkey, which he eats rapidly and with exaggerated facial expressions. He subsequently orders more food and consumes it in large quantities. His appearance becomes increasingly grotesque as he stuffs portions of the tablecloth and dishes into his mouth. He eventually becomes obese and begins looking at a woman seated nearby. The woman successively transforms into a heart, a nude figure, and an ice cream before returning to her original form.

The man and woman then transform into a car and travel to a supermarket. The man's enormously enlarged hand reaches into the building and gathers its food, placing it in the car's trunk. The car subsequently transforms into a city, which transitions to another restaurant where the man and woman are seated together. The man pours a drink into the woman's glass before continuing to eat. As he consumes increasing amounts of food, his body transforms into a larger figure with multiple faces and four arms, each eating and reaching for food on the table. His number of arms and mouths continues to increase as his body grows larger. His head eventually transforms into a claw machine, which collects food from his plate, before he returns to human form with an enormously distended abdomen.

The scene then shifts to the silhouette of a woman dancing. As the man kisses her, she transforms into several kitchen pans. The setting transitions from a kitchen to a bathroom, where the man appears as a grotesque figure wearing only underwear and brushing his teeth. He later sleeps naked on an increasingly overwhelmed bed. His stomach begins to growl loudly, prompting him to get up and take several pills before returning to bed. The man subsequently falls from the bed and lands in an area inhabited by many malnourished people. They surround him and begin eating his body. More people join the group, eventually devouring the man and ending the short film.

== Background and production ==
A 30-second excerpt from Hunger that emphasizes the use of object shape modification and line interpolation techniques.

Peter Foldes worked in collaboration with the National Research Council Canada's Division of Radio and Electrical Engineering's Data Systems Group, who decided to develop a computer animation application in 1969. NRC scientist Nestor Burtnyk had heard an animator from Disney explain the traditional animation process, where a head animator draws the key cels and assistants draw the fill in pictures. Burtnyk worked as lead animator and wrote the computer program code on the NRC project. The work of the artist's assistant seemed to Burtnyk to be the ideal demonstration vehicle for computer animation. Within a year, he and physicist Marceli Wein programmed a "key frame animation" package to create animated sequences from key frames.

The National Film Board in Montreal was contacted so that artists could experiment with computer animation. Foldes, who was living in Paris at the time, was contacted first. He gave an "unusual script proposal" based on the use of metamorphosis to René Jodoin, the head of NFB's French animation division at the time. Titled Hunger, the script would have required a larger production team with a higher budget, which contrasted with the French animation unit's "production philosophy". Despite the risks, Jodoin understood that the use of metamorphosis between images would work well for a system designed to use automated interpolation techniques.

Foldes' first film using Burtnyk's program was a 1971 computer key frame animated short experimental film involving freehand drawings called Metadata. Following the significant attention and reviews of the short film that summer, Jodoin decided that the next step would be to make a "normal" short film. Compared to many computer animators in the United States at the time, Foldes emphasized figurative drawing and politically charged themes, which served as the basis for Hunger to convey an unsettling mood.

Hunger took Foldes and his NRC partners a year and a half to complete. Foldes, Burtnyk, and Wein used a 2D technique that allowed object shape modification and line interpolation techniques. Stylistically, the short film's line drawings dissolve and reshape to form various images. The budget for Hunger was $38,893 (equivalent to $270,603 in 2025) to produce. Featuring no dialogue, the music for the short film was composed by Pierre F. Brault. According to John Culhane of The New York Times, Hunger uses a Dante Alighieri-esque view of modern gluttony, based on the transformation of a "slim, handsome young man into a grotesque and obese old man." On a book detailing productions made by the National Film Board of Canada, Gary Evans emphasized the short film's concept as based on consequences from gluttony and greed. Hunger was released in 1974 with a running time of eleven minutes.

== Critical reception and legacy ==
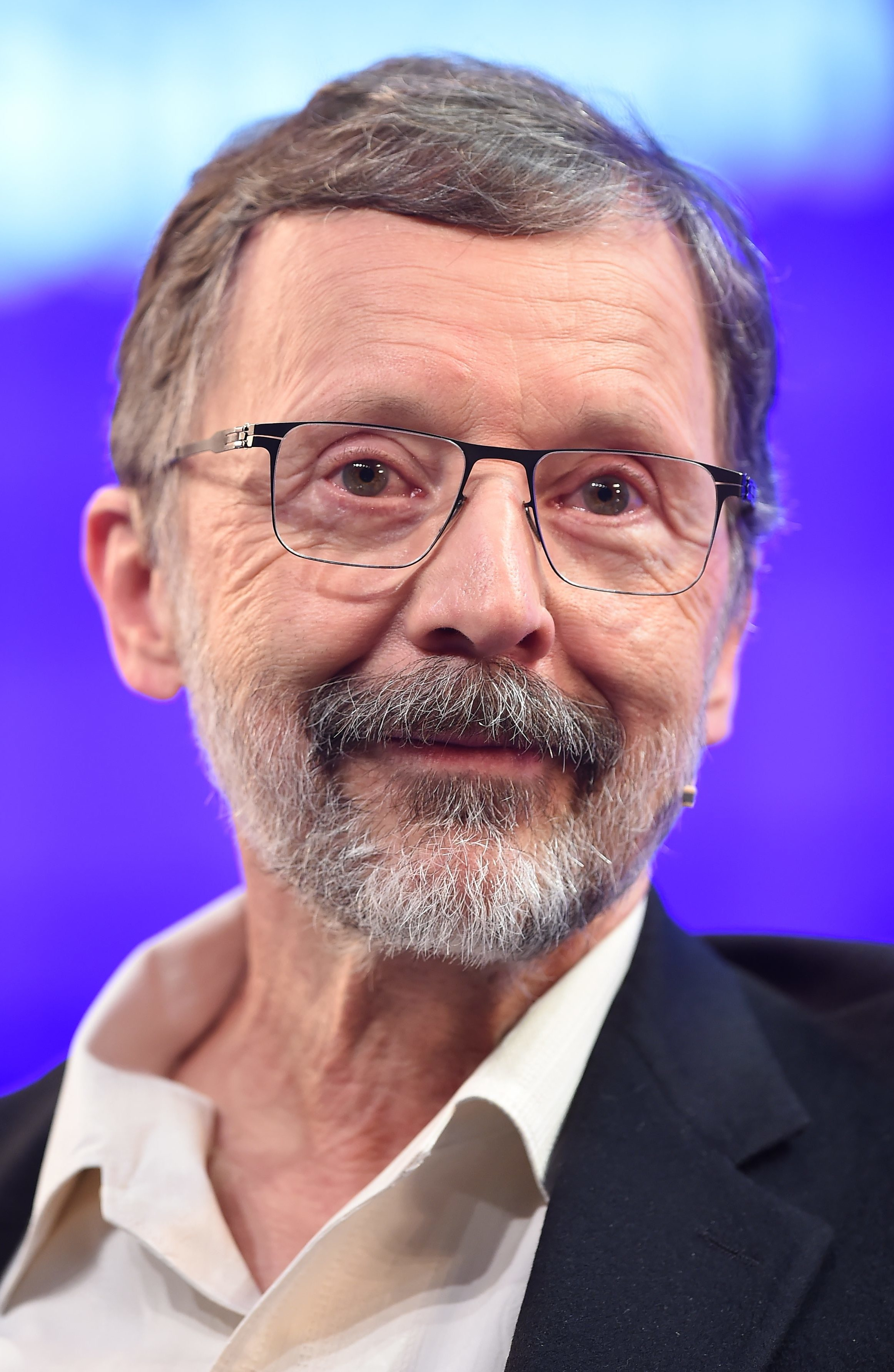
Pixar co-founder Edwin Catmull considered Hunger as a "cornerstone example" based on the consequences of computer animation.

French film critic André Martin praised Hunger as the first convincing character animation with its use of computer methods, considering its depiction to be "credible and convincing". New York Times writer John Culhane considered Hunger to be "another triumph but one which uses a very different technique" in an article based on mature themes and the use of computers in animation. He stated that Foldes' visual style gives an "inhuman, flowing motion that perfectly suits his terrifying transformations", and wrote that it was the "first fully animated figurative film ever made using computer techniques."

Retrospectively, Evens described the short film as not just a warning to a modern industrialized world, but a "prophecy in an age that worships individual gain and pays grudging lip-service to social consciousness." Giannalberto Bendazzi, author of Animation: A World History, wrote that while the computer animation of Hunger felt outdated, "the poetry and the political message against world poverty are still fresh." Film scholar Mark Wolf commented that the linear method of the short film "move independently of one another" while transforming into another object, comparing it to Émile Cohl's Fantasmagorie (1908). In 2015, animation historian Tom Sito compared its influence on computer artists to Winsor McCay's influence on traditional animators with Gertie the Dinosaur (1913).

Hunger received multiple international film awards throughout 1974 and 1975, including the Cannes Film Festival, Chicago International Film Festival, and 28th British Academy Film Awards. The short film was nominated for an Oscar in the Best Animated Short Film category for the 47th Academy Awards in 1975, becoming the world's first fully computer-generated animated movie to be nominated. When a National Film Board of Canada representative was asked about its accolades during the Cannes Film Festival, they responded that if Hunger didn't win a prize for short films, then it likely won the previous year. In addition, the short film appeared on the PBS program The Fantastic Animation Festival.

Hunger served as a major influence in technologists' interests in artistic animation through computer engineering and filmmaking fields, particularly in Canada. Edwin Catmull, who served as director of the New York Institute of Technology's Computer Graphics Lab and later co-founded Pixar, considered the film as a "cornerstone example" in his 1978 paper based on the consequences of computer animation. In 1996, the Festival of Computer Animation in Toronto granted Burtnyk and Wein an award for Fathers of Computer Animation Technology in Canada. In 1997, they both earned an Academy Award for Technical Achievement in computer animation for their "pioneering work" on Hunger. The Ottawa International Animation Festival paid tribute to Burtnyk and Wein in 1998, saying that "their work led the way for a flood of technological innovations in Canada and beyond."

=== Accolades ===
- Cannes Film Festival, Cannes: Special Jury Award - Short Films, 1974
- Edinburgh International Film Festival, Edinburgh: Certificate of Merit, Interfilm Jury, 1974
- Chicago International Film Festival, Chicago: Silver Hugo, 1974
- Chicago International Film Festival, Chicago: Norman McLaren Award, 1974
- International Week of Cinema in Colour, Barcelona: Gold Medal, 1974
- International Week of Cinema, Nairobi: Gold Impala for Best Short Film, 1974
- Yorkton Film Festival, Yorkton: Golden Sheaf Award for Best Animation, 1975
- International Animation Film Festival, New York: Golden Praxinoscope, 1975
- World Festival of Animated Film, Varna, Bulgaria: Special Award, Short and Medium Length Films, 1975
- Melbourne Film Festival, Melbourne: Diploma of Merit, 1975
- American Film and Video Festival, New York: Blue Ribbon, International Affairs, 1975
- Philadelphia International Festival of Short Films, Philadelphia: Award for Exceptional Merit, 1975
- 28th British Academy Film Awards, London: BAFTA Award for Best Short Animation, 1975
- 47th Academy Awards, Los Angeles: Nominee: Best Animated Short Film, 1975
- The Festival of Computer Animation, Toronto: Fathers of Computer Animation Technology, 1996
- 69th Academy Awards, Los Angeles: Award for Technical Achievement in Film (Cartoon Process: Computer Assisted Key Framing for Character Animation), 1997

== Works cited ==
- Bendazzi, Giannalberto (2015). Animation: A World History: Volume II: The Birth of a Style - The Three Markets. CRC Press. ISBN 1317519914.
- Century, Michael (2022). Northern Sparks: Innovation, Technology Policy, and the Arts in Canada from Expo 67 to the Internet Age. MIT Press. ISBN 0262045001.
- Evans, Gary (1991). In the National Interest: A Chronicle of the National Film Board of Canada from 1949 to 1989. University of Toronto Press. ISBN 0802027849.
- Parent, Rick (2001). Computer Animation: Algorithms and Techniques. Elsevier Science. ISBN 0080502504.
- Sito, Tom (2015). Moving Innovation: A History of Computer Animation. MIT Press. ISBN 978-0-262-52840-5.
