= Todos Juntos =

2011 song by Dora the Explorer and Shakira

Song by Shakira featuring Dora the Explorer

from the album We Did It! Dora's Greatest Hits
- Released: 2011
- Recorded: 2010
- Genre: Children's song; soundtrack
- Length: 1:52
- Label: Nick Records; Viacom International Inc.
- Songwriters: George R. Noriega; Joel O. Someillan

"Todos Juntos" (English: "Everyone Together") is a song by Colombian singer-songwriter Shakira featuring children's animated TV series character Dora the Explorer, voiced by American actress Caitlin Sanchez. The song has its verses in English and chorus in Spanish, and lyrically advocates for solidarity and friendship.

== Background ==
Shakira first collaborated with Dora the Explorer in 2010, when she wrote her first children's book "Dora the Explorer in the World School Day Adventure", published by Grupo Editorial Norma. In a press release, Shakira expressed her passion for education: "Education is a cause very close to my heart. I want children from all over the world to know that through knowledge and education one can embark on great adventures." Shakira also took part in designing a collection of backpacks for "Beyond the Backpack" campaign that marked the 10th anniversary of "Dora the Explorer" and supported the Children's Defense Fund through fundraising efforts in 2010.

== Release ==
"Todos Juntos" is featured in the Dora the Explorer TV series Dora's Explorer Girls special episode titled "Our First Concert" produced by the American cable TV Nick Jr. Channel. The song is also featured on Dora's greatest hits album We Did It! Dora's Greatest Hits.

Shakira commented on the collaboration that "Dora is an inspiration to children all over the world, and is to me as well. It was an honor to work with Nickelodeon on this episode because education is a cause that is very close to my heart. I want every child to know that through knowledge and education they can embark upon great aventures." She described "Todos Juntos" as "a great song", "uplifting", and "about working together as a team to make this world a better place".

== Music video ==
The music video for "Todos Juntos" features Shakira alongside animated Dora the Explorer. Bar Shakira, the video is animated and features vibrant rainbows, flowers and hot air balloons in pastel colors.

== Reception ==
Closer hailed "Todos Juntos" as "worthy of Disney productions", highlighting how the song lyrically "[affirms] that everything can only be better when we all act together". Public described how in the music video Shakira the "sexy blonde put her sexy shorts and alluring outfits in the closet, to bring out her prettiest smile", commenting that the "lyrics of the song are unequivocal, pleading for solidarity between beings". Kevin Boucher from Puremédias noted the contrast between the song and Shakira's previous single "Rabiosa", reflecting how "Todos Juntos" is "much less… sexy. And for good reason" as it's a song for children, and encapsulated the song as "a concentrate of good feelings". Sylvain Pechu from Oh! My Mag noticed how "Shakira forgets her sex appeal for her latest title" singing "song full of good feelings", and drew contrast between the video and that of Shakira's 2009 single "She Wolf", while assessing that The video is sure to captivate the youngest viewers with its "colorful universe made of rainbows, hot air balloons and flowers". Télé-Loisirs stated that in the video Dora "becomes almost sexy alongside Shakira" while "Shakira becomes less hot with her new friend Dora", pointed out that its "colors are pastels, faithful to the cartoon", and summarized how it's "not very sexy, but it's cute and it risks touching adults who have retained their childish soul". Jonathan Hamard from Charts in France saw the Shakira as "much less sexy than in her last music video "Rabiosa", but also outlining how the "childish spirit of this project suits her perfectly". Adrian Carrasquillo from Fox News called Dora and Shakira a "Latina power duo". Fanpage.it assessed how the song "talks about how important it is to help each other in order to realize one's dreams and projects and how a tolerant world is not only a possibility but even a necessity in these times". Purebreak described jow in the video "Shakira maintains her natural class. Dressed teen style with jeans tucked into her boots, she still looks stunning".
