= Mechander Robo =

Japanese anime television series

合身戦隊メカンダーロボ (Gasshin Sentai Mekandā Robo)
- Genre: Mecha
- Anime television series
- Directed by: Yoshikata Nitta; Masayuki Hayashi; Kōzō Masanobu; Yoshiyuki Tomino
- Produced by: Takao Niimi (Tokyo Channel 12); Mitsuo Sato (Wako Productions); Katsumi Kawabata (Tokyu Agency)
- Written by: Takeshi Honda; Satoshi Suyama; Hisayuki Toriumi
- Music by: Michiaki Watanabe
- Studio: Wako Productions
- Original network: Tokyo Channel 12
- English network: GMA-7 (1979 Philippines); GMA Cebu and Davao (Cebuano Philippines); MBC TV (1986 South Korea)
- Original run: March 3, 1977 – December 29, 1977
- Episodes: 35

Mechander Robot (合身戦隊メカンダーロボ, Gasshin Sentai Mekandā Robo) is an anime series that aired in 1977 in Japan. There were 35 episodes aired at 25 minutes each. It is also known as Gasshin Sentai Mechander Robo, Mekander, Mechander, Combiner Battle Team Mekander Robot, Combining Squadron Mechander Robo, Mekander Robot and Mekanda. It was produced by Tokyu Agency and animated by Wako Productions.

== Original story ==
The Doron Empire, hailing from the Ganymede system came to Earth in order to conquer it. General Doron already overthrew the queen Medusa of Ganymede in the Magellan star cluster. Earth's defenses were no match; in a matter of days, 95% of the Earth fell under Doron's occupation. Doctor Shikishima, a brilliant scientist, places his last hopes for Earth in a robot (Mechander Robo) that he has created. The mother of Jimi would be reborn into a cyborg who is now the leader of the opposing forces and her memory could not recall the past. An interesting twist to the usual giant robot formula was that the Doron empire, after having devastated Earth in their successful first strike, ringed it with energy-detecting satellites programmed to lob hugely destructive payloads (similar to H-bombs) on Earth's surface wherever they picked up energy signatures suggesting human technological activity. Having no means to tackle the alien satellites the Mechander's crew had less than three minutes to successfully engage and beat the invaders' mecha on Earth's surface, before being atomized by the incoming alien bombardment.

== Production note ==
The production company was plagued with bankruptcy issues, so the main sponsors forced the studios to reuse footage from old episodes to patch newer episodes without redrawing new animation. The final episode was merely a complete recap of the series.

== Concept ==
Mechander Robo following combination

Three command jets - Mechander-1, Mechander-2 and Mechander-3 - combine to form one larger jet known as Mechander Max, which then would dock at the back of Mechander Robo. Some of the trademark weapons include spiked shields, missile pod forearms, chest flame throwers and missiles shaped like sharks. Halfway through the series, Mechander Robo is severely damaged, but is rebuilt as four component ships combining to form the robot before docking with Mechander Max.

Despite the show targeting young audiences at the time and that the opposing forces were robots, the attack techniques and damages in battle are quite violent by today's standards.

== Staff ==
- Episode director
  Takashi Anno
  Yasuo Hasegawa
  Masayuki Hayashi
  Yoshiyuki Tomino
  Kozo Masanobu
- Producer
  Sumio Takahashi
- Screenwriter
  Hisayuki Toriumi
  Takashi Anno
- Designer
  Nobuhiro Okaseko
  Tsuneo Ninomiya
- Mechanical designer
  Mechaman
- Animator
  Satoshi Touzan
  Tsuneo Ninomiya
  Masayuki Hayashi
  Kozo Masanobu
  Takeshi Honda
- Music
  Michiaki Watanabe
- Opening theme
  "Tri-Attack! Mechander Robo" by Ichiro Mizuki and the Columbia Cradle Club

== Wako Pro ==
Wako Pro
- Native name: 和光プロダクション (1976-1990) ワコープロ(1993-）
- Formerly: Wako Production (1976-1990); Teleimage (1990-1993)
- Industry: Animation; Outsourcing
- Founded: 1965
- Founder: Sumio Takahashi
- Fate: Dormancy

Wako Pro (和光プロ) was an animation and outsourcing production company formed in 1965 by Sumio Takahashi. The company was renamed to Wako Production (和光プロダクション) in 1976. In 1987, Wako Production entered into a partnership with Telescreen and in 1990, the company's name was once again changed, this time to Teleimage. The company stopped producing new anime starting from 1993 and was renamed back to Wako Pro (but with full kana ワコープロ).

== Characters ==
| Name | Vehicle | Voices by |
|---|---|---|
| Narrator | | Kouji Nakata |
| Jimmy Orion | Mechander-1 | Akira Kamiya |
| Kojiro Hachijima (Marcus Vance) | Mechander-2 | Kazuyuki Sogabe |
| Ryosuke Shikishima (David Humbolt) | Toraika B-3 | Akio Nojima |
| Mika Shikishima (Jenny Humbolt) | | Keiko Yokozawa |
| General Ozmel (Gen. Goznel) | | Masane Tsukayama |
| Professor Shikishima (Prof. Humbolt) | | Masaya Taki |
| Medusa | | Natsuko Fuji |

== International broadcasts ==
Mechander Robo was dubbed in English for broadcast in the Philippines in the late-1970s. It also aired by MBC TV Korea in 1986 as "메칸더V" (MechanderV) and was dubbed in Korean, and was one of the most popular robot animations. Outside of Asia, it was only broadcast in Italy, in 1982, under the title Mechander Robot.

== Video game appearance ==
Mechander Robo debuted in the Super Robot Wars series as part of Super Robot Wars Compact 3 for the Wonderswan Color. True to the anime, if Mechander Robo is deployed and a certain number of turns pass, the Omega Missile will appear and attempt to destroy as many robots in the player's force as it can reach.

== Toys ==
During the series' release, a toy of Mechander Robo was released by Bullmark.

In 2009, CM's Corporation released an 18 cm. action figure of Mechander Robo as part of the Mecha Action Series line. The figure features a Mechander Max jet that docks in the back, as well as cargo bays on the feet to store either the Triger-3 ship, the New Triger or two Jaws shark missiles. The forearm shields can combine into the Mechander UFO weapon. Other accessories include the Mechander Fencer sword, additional hands and an Omega Missile. A second edition in a metallic finish was also released.
