= The Adventures of OG Sherlock Kush =

- Genre: Comedy; Adult Animation; Mystery
- Created by: Joseph Carnegie
- Directed by: Ben Jones
- Voices of: Peter Serafinowicz; Rich Fulcher; Chris Parnell; Megan Amram; Ben Jones; Joseph Carnegie
- Composer: David Schmoll
- Country of origin: United States
- Original language: English
- No. of seasons: 2
- No. of episodes: 20

Production
- Editors: Nathaniel Atcheson; James Atkinson
- Production companies: Friends Night; ADHD Studios

Original release
- Network: FXX (2015–2016); Animation Domination High-Def
- Release: January 1, 2015 – February 26, 2016

The Adventures of OG Sherlock Kush is an American adult animated comedy series that aired on FXX. The character is created by Joseph Carnegie and was first introduced on October 27, 2014, in a Season 2 episode of Lucas Bros Moving Co.

Season One premiered on FXX on January 1, 2015, as a part of the channel's Animation Domination programming block. The series aired an 11-minute special, The Mystery of The Royal Flasher, as a part of their 4/20 Block on April 20, 2015.

A second season was announced on January 29, 2016 and episodes began airing on exclusively on Animation Domination High-Def's YouTube Channel on February 1, 2016.

== Plot ==
OG Sherlock Kush and Watson work together to solve London's toughest mysteries. Their plan almost constantly backfires because OG Sherlock Kush gets too high.

== Cast ==
- Peter Serafinowicz - OG Sherlock Kush
- Rich Fulcher - Watson
- Chris Parnell - The Prime Minister / Jack The Ripper Jr.
- Ben Jones - Constable Jones
- Megan Amram - The Queen, Jaclyn Ripper
- Heather Anne Campbell - Maria
- Joseph Carnegie - Royal Guardsmen, Executioner, Evil Pig
