= Major Lazer (TV series) =

American adult animation series

- Genre: Musical show; Action; Science fiction; Dystopian fiction
- Created by: Diplo; Ferry Gouw; Kevin Kusatsu
- Developed by: Nick Weidenfeld; Diplo; Ferry Gouw; Kevin Kusatsu
- Creative director: Ben Jones
- Voices of: Adewale Akinnuoye-Agbaje; Angela Trimbur; John Boyega; Ashante "Taranchyla" Reid; James Adomian; J. K. Simmons
- Theme music composer: Diplo; Derek "DJA" Allen
- Composer: Major Lazer
- Country of origin: United States
- Original language: English
- No. of seasons: 1
- No. of episodes: 11 (+ unaired Pilot)

Production
- Executive producers: Rob Anderson; Nick Weidenfeld; Hend Baghdady
- Producers: Nick Rutherford; Al LeVine
- Editors: Al LeVine; Nick Gallucci
- Running time: 10–12 minutes
- Production companies: Mad Decent; Friends Night; ADHD Studios

Original release
- Network: FXX
- Release: October 27, 2014 – June 25, 2015

Major Lazer is an American adult animated television series created by Diplo, Ferry Gouw and Kevin Kusatsu for FXX. Based on the electronic music group of the same name, it was initially pitched to Cartoon Network's nighttime programming block Adult Swim but never materialized. It premiered on October 27, 2014 as a sneak peek before it officially premiered on April 16, 2015, as part of FXX's Animation Domination High-Def (ADHD) block. After Stone Quackers, Major Lazer is the second ADHD original series to be aired on the channel after Fox had stopped its broadcast of the block itself.

The show was renewed for a second season, but was later canceled. The show is available to stream on the Major Lazer YouTube channel.

== Plot ==
Set in the future, Major Lazer is a Jamaican superhero with a laser gun for a right hand who fights against the dystopian forces led by Jamaica's leader President Whitewall and his servant General Rubbish. Major Lazer is assisted in his fight by President Whitewall's daughter Penny Whitewall and hacker Blkmrkt.

== Production ==
Major Lazer had been in production for nearly five years before its premiere. It was originally considered for Adult Swim through a pilot episode produced in 2011 by Williams Street and Titmouse, Inc., which was never broadcast. The musical group Major Lazer, on which the show is based, previously starred animated characters, including the character of Major Lazer. Ferry Gouw, along with John Pham, served as art director for this incarnation. Other musicians such as Jay Z, and the Odd Future collective, had signed on for television shows on the network during the year; Odd Future's came out as Loiter Squad the next year. Billboard announced Major Lazer would premiere on Fox in 2014. Cat Power and Riff Raff were said to have collaborated on the soundtrack for the show.

In 2015, Billboard announced the show would premiere on FXX. Diplo called the long wait of the production "worth it to have such a succinct TV show for our music fans and cartoon fans alike". He said that it would appeal to "any fans of hip-hop [and] electronic music or '80s cartoons, and the culture that gave birth to [Major Lazer's] musical landscape". Adewale Akinnuoye-Agbaje, who voices the eponymous character, described the feeling of the show as "like being high". J. K. Simmons voices President Whitewall, while Aziz Ansari, Ezra Koenig, Riff Raff, Andy Samberg, and Charli XCX make guest voice performances.

== Voice cast ==
=== Principal cast ===
- Adewale Akinnuoye-Agbaje – Major Lazer, Evil Lazer (episode 10)
- James Adomian – General Rubbish
- John Boyega – Blkmrkt
- Ashante "Taranchyla" Reid – Old Rasta, PG Tipps, Weed Man (episode 1)
- J. K. Simmons – President Whitewall
- Angela Trimbur – Penny Whitewall

=== Guest Stars & Additional voices ===
- Trinidad James – Mr. Mary James (episode 1), Goldie (episode 9)
- Tiësto – DJ God (episode 2)
- Jonathan Banks – The Law (episode 2)
- Andy Samberg – Dr. Nerd/Dr. Bass Drop (episodes 2–3)
- Riff Raff – Double Cup (episode 4), Additional Voices (episode 7)
- Udo Kier – Head Vampire Vampire (episode 5)
- Ezra Koenig – Ryland (episode 5)
- Matt Berry – Professor Teacher (episodes 6–7)
- Jorma Taccone – Spooky Dookie (episode 6), Killscreen (episode 8), K-Pop (episode 10)
- Aziz Ansari – Goosh (episode 7)
- Heather Anne Campbell – Game Tournament Worker (episode 8)
- Kumail Nanjiani – Thor (episode 8)
- Ferry Gouw – Kamikaze (episode 9)
- Clyde Kusatsu – Store Owner (episode 9)
- Chan Marshall – Knife Fight (episode 9)
- Mike Skinner – Block Head (episode 9)
- Charli XCX – Lady Vanessa Rothchild (episode 11)

== Episodes ==
=== Pilot (2011) ===
No.	Title	Directed by	Written by	Original release date	Prod. code
0	"Major Lazer"	Casper Kelly, Chris Prynoski, and Dave Willis	Casper Kelly and Dave Willis	N/A	TBA

=== Series (2015) ===
No.	Title	Directed by	Written by	Original release date	International debut	Prod. code	US viewers (millions)
1	"Bad Seed"	Douglas Einar Olsen	Nick Rutherford	April 16, 2015	25 October 2016 (described as episode 2)	105	N/A
Major Lazer goes on vacation. After visiting the Weed Man, Penny smokes some weed she got from the Weed Man and goes on a bad trip. Major Lazer comes to Penny's rescue and fights off Mr. Mary James.
2	"Escape from Rave Island"	Aldin Baroza	Nick Rutherford	April 23, 2015	26 October 2016 (described as episode 3)	102	N/A
Penny persuades Major Lazer and Blkmrkt to have the rave at Ibiza where a foam incident in 2015 has rendered the island inhospitable. Once there, Major Lazer, Penny, and Blkmrkt encounter the Rave Rats (who were evolved from those who survived the foam incident) and also battle a robot working for the law.
3	"Treble in Paradise"	Chase Conley	Nick Rutherford	April 30, 2015	27 October 2016 (described as episode 4)	106	N/A
Penny's teacher Dr. Nerd steals all the world's bass into a single drop (affectionately named the "Bass Drop"), ruining a gig Major Lazer is doing. After Major Lazer and Penny go after Dr. Nerd to persuade him to give back the "Bass Drop," Dr. Nerd swallows it and becomes transported into music.
4	"Double Cup"	Chase Conley	Nick Rutherford	May 7, 2015	31 October 2016 (described as episode 5)	101	N/A
In order to ruin Major Lazer's upcoming Free the Universe party, President Whitewall and General Rubbish send their operative Double Cup to slip some cough syrup into the sodas that will be served. Upon overhearing her father's plan, Penny informs Major Lazer and Blkmrkt where they must work to stop Double Cup from making Major Lazer's party not happen.
5	"Vampire Weekend"	Douglas Einar Olsen	Nick Rutherford	October 27, 2014 (sneak peek); May 14, 2015 (official debut)	24 October 2016 (described as episode 1)	103	N/A
During a solar eclipse, "Vampire Weekend" begins as a group of Vampires arrive on vacation. Penny Whitewall falls in love with a Vampire named Ryland after President Whitewall leaves Future Kingston to evade getting caught up in the event. In order to deal with the events driving him to his bunker, President Whitewall contacts General Rubbish to put an end to Vampire Weekend by enlisting the Vampire Vampires led by the Head Vampire Vampire (who happens to be Ryland's Dad).
6	"The Legend of Spooky Dookie"	Chase Conley	Nick Weidenfeld	May 21, 2015	1 November 2016	TBA	N/A
On the nights before the local prom, Spooky Dookie is stealing the hearts of girls in their dreams as a result of his heart breaking long ago when his girlfriend dumped him for a younger Major Lazer. As Major Lazer's weapon is useless in the dreamworld, Penny is the only one to take out Spooky Dookie when she is sent to stop Spooky Dookie's plot.
7	"I'm Gonna Git You Suckoid"	Chase Conley and Paul Harmon	Sean O'Connor	May 28, 2015	2 November 2016	TBA	N/A
Underground worm-like creatures have been attacking people at dance clubs throughout Jamaica. Upon being dubbed Suckoids, President Whitewall and General Rubbish initiate a ban on all dancing to avoid further attacks. Penny befriends a teen named Goosh who is hunting the Suckoids ever since he lost his parents to them. Major Lazer and Blkmrkt come up with a plan to lure the Suckoids into a trap so that he and Goosh can destroy them.
8	"I, Killscreen"	Chase Conley	Sean O'Connor	June 4, 2015 (Note: This episode aired on Hulu on May 29, 2015 before its TV date and was wrongly listed as "I'm Gonna Git You Suckoid." This error has since been corrected.)	3 November 2016	TBA	N/A
Penny and Blkmrkt try out a new dance video game. When Major Lazer tries the game out at the time when his laser is being repaired, he is downloaded by the evil video game lord Killscreen where he plans to eliminate him at the big video game tournament at Jamaica's largest arcade called Arcadia in order to impress General Rubbish. Now Penny must compete against Blkmrkt's former partner Thor in order to keep Major Lazer from being killed.
9	"Fizzy Fever"	Chase Conley and Mike Davis	Nick Rutherford	June 12, 2015	7 November 2016	TBA	N/A
Blkmrkt purchases a dog named Fizzy whose bark can perform dance music and shows this off to Major Lazer. Penny later tells Major Lazer about President Whitewall's plan to get rid of the dog. President Whitewall's plan to get rid of Fizzy involves him having General Rubbish send his assassins Goldie (the Trinidadian voodoo prince with the Midas touch), Booty Monster, Snakepit, Triple-Threat, Sub-Human, Blockhead, Kamikaze, Knife Fight, and the Warriors to dispose of Fizzy. As Major Lazer fights his way past every assassin to get to the last space launch spot on Earth to send Fizzy into space, General Rubbish is unaware the Knife Fight is secretly helping Major Lazer.
10	"K-Pop!!"	Chase Conley	Sean O'Connor	June 18, 2015	8 November 2016	TBA	N/A
Dr. Acid creates the synthetic humanoid K-Pop for General Rubbish where his songs are programmed to brainwash teenagers into killing Major Lazer and even has President Whitewall play a demo for Penny. When K-Pop's programming evolves to the point where he breaks the brainwashing to help Major Lazer, General Rubbish orders Dr. Acid to unleash his android Evil Lazer to attack Major Lazer.
11	"Throwback Thursdays"	Douglas Einar Olsen	Chris Goodwin	June 25, 2015	9 November 2016	TBA	N/A
On Throwback Thursday, zombies suddenly manifest on Jamaica. Major Lazer is informed by Penny and Blkmrkt that the rip in the space-time continuum is caused by Lady Vanessa Rothschild having taken President Whitewall back in time. After getting President Whitewall back in time, Major Lazer pursues Lady Vanessa Rothschild in order to keep her from rewriting history where she is the mother of humanity and fix the space-time continuum before it gets worse.

== Broadcast and reception ==
The show premiered on April 16, 2015. The Major Lazer group's third album was expected to be released near the same date, but was moved to June 1. A special preview of the show was broadcast on October 27, 2014, on FXX. Erik Adams of The A.V. Club graded the series with a B, praising its visuals reminiscent of the "chunky outlines, washed-out colors, and fantastical content of '80s Saturday-morning fare" while calling the writing solid yet familiar.

In 2016, Teletoon at Night broadcast the show at 11:15pm EST in Canada.

From 2018 to 2020, the show was sporadically broadcast in Germany on the channel ProSieben Fun.
