= Beck Bennett =

American actor and comedian (born 1984)

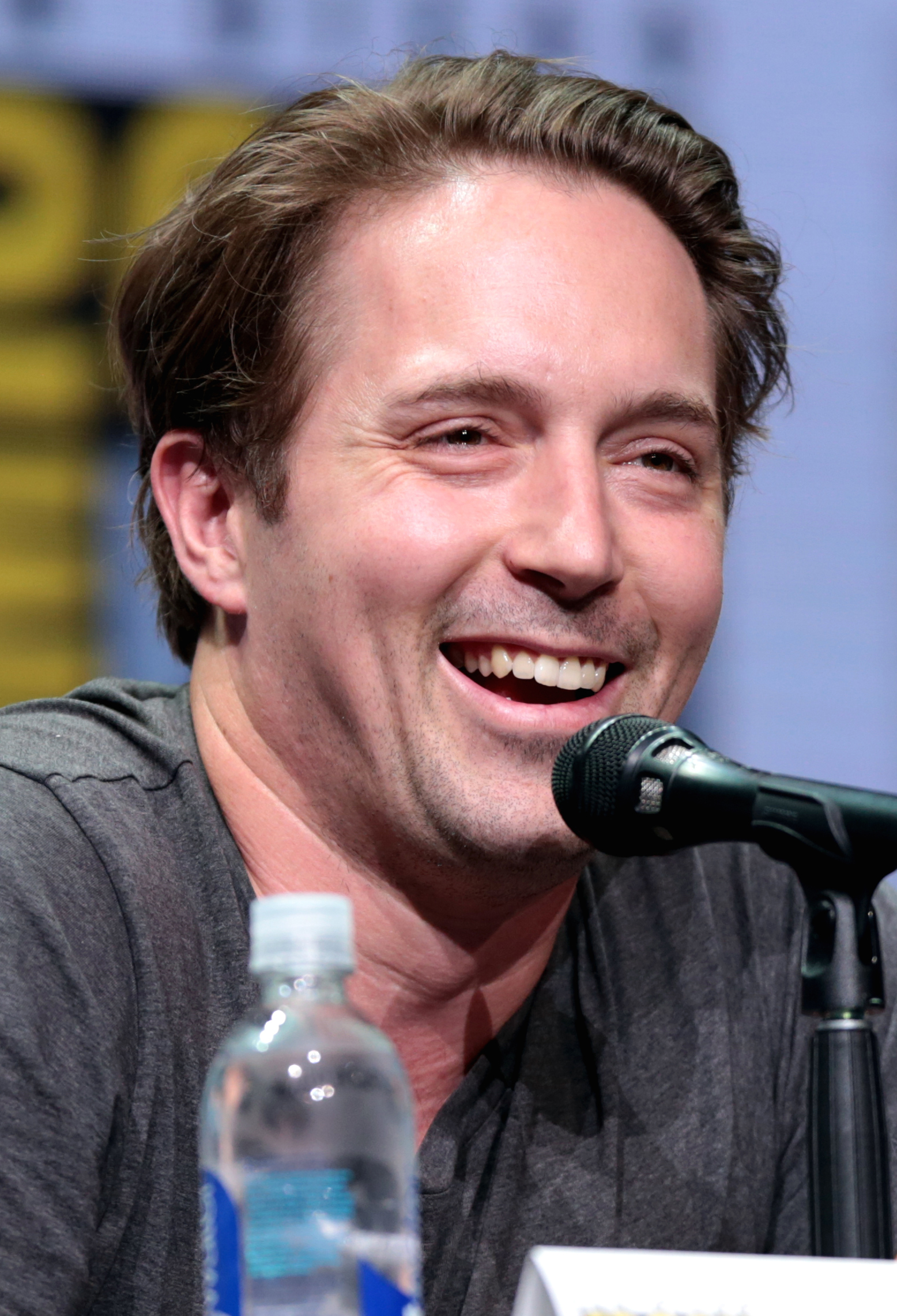
- Bennett in 2017
- Born: Christopher Beck Bennett; October 1, 1984 (age 42); Wilmette, Illinois, U.S.
- Education: University of Southern California (BFA)
- Occupations: Actor; comedian
- Years active: 2005–present
- Spouse: Jessy Hodges (m. 2018)
- Children: 1
- Relatives: Ellen Sandweiss (mother-in-law)

Christopher Beck Bennett (born October 1, 1984) is an American actor and comedian. He was a cast member on the NBC sketch comedy series Saturday Night Live (SNL) for eight seasons, joining for its 39th season in 2013 and leaving at the end of its 46th season in 2021. Before SNL, Bennett performed in AT&T's "It's Not Complicated" commercials, in which he interviewed children, and produced sketch videos with the comedy group Good Neighbor.

== Early life ==
Christopher Beck Bennett was born in Wilmette, Illinois, a suburb of Chicago, on October 1, 1984. His parents are Sarah and Andy Bennett. He performed in multiple shows at the Children's Theatre of Winnetka. He graduated in 2003 from New Trier High School, where he played Jean Valjean in his school's production of Les Misérables. Bennett attended the USC School of Dramatic Arts in the B.F.A. Acting program.

== Career ==
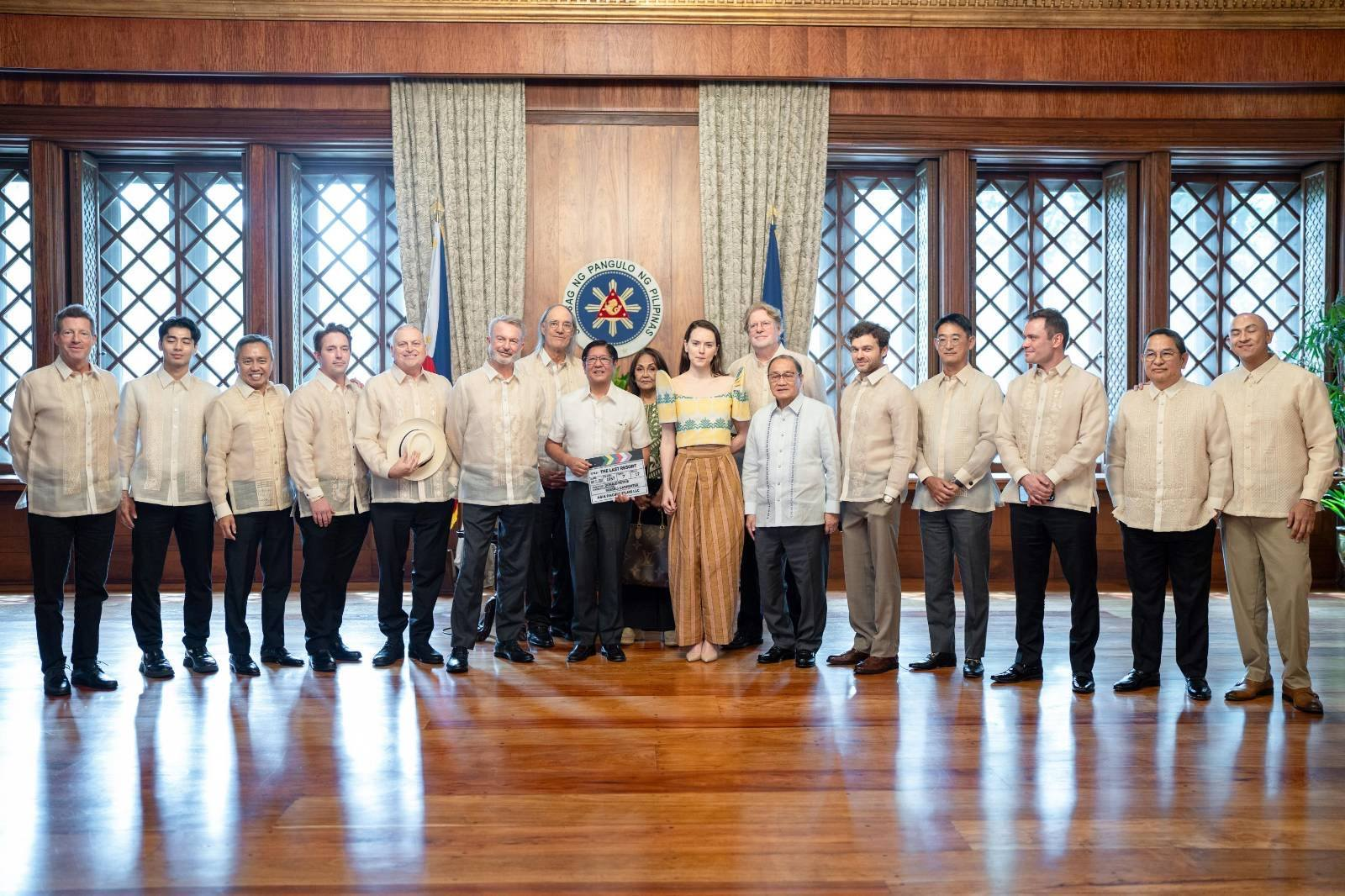
Bennett (fourth from the left) with the cast and crew of The Last Resort (2027) paying a courtesy call to Philippine president Bongbong Marcos in Manila in May 2025

In 2003, Bennett joined the improv/sketch group Commedus Interruptus along with fellow eventual Saturday Night Live cast member Kyle Mooney and Nick Rutherford. In 2007, after graduation, Mooney, Rutherford, and Bennett joined editor/director Dave McCary to form the sketch group Good Neighbor. The group received praise from comedian Louis C.K. and director Steven Spielberg, who sent Mooney, Bennett, Rutherford, and McCary a personal acknowledgement after being impressed by the Hook parody Unbelievable Dinner. He complimented the sketch and encouraged the group to continue making funny movies.

In 2011, Bennett created the satirical political talk show Fresh Perspectives, which helped him land his AT&T commercials interviewing children. He also hosted the YouTube show Theatre of Life.

In 2012, he appeared in the film Kill Me Now, a film starring multiple Internet sketch-comedy groups, and filmed Beside Still Waters by writer/director Chris Lowell.

In March 2013, he appeared in an episode of Last Man Standing, and that August voiced a character for Axe Cop for Fox's Animation Domination High-Def programming block. That year, Good Neighbor produced a pilot for Comedy Central with Adam McKay's Gary Sanchez production company, though it was not picked up as a series, due to the move of three of the troupe's four members to New York City to star on Saturday Night Live. That same year, Bennett completed work on the independent film Balls Out and appeared in season 4 of Arrested Development.

Bennett voiced Launchpad McQuack in the DuckTales reboot that ran from 2017 to 2021, and Eric in the Sony Pictures Animation film The Mitchells vs. the Machines. He is the voice of Hamster in the Disney Channel animated series Hamster & Gretel, and also voiced Sterling in Fixed.

Since 2023, Bennett has voiced Hank the Buffalo in Buffalo Wild Wings commercials.

In 2025, Bennett appeared as Steve Lombard in Superman (2025). In August of that year, he and Kyle Mooney launched the podcast What's Our Podcast?.

=== Saturday Night Live ===
Bennett debuted as a featured player on Saturday Night Live in its 39th season on September 28, 2013. He was promoted to repertory status for SNL's 41st season on October 2, 2015. He left the show after the finale of the 46th season on May 22, 2021. In an interview with Time magazine, Bennett said he left the show so he could be with his wife in Los Angeles. He made subsequent cameo appearances in the Saturday Night Live 50th Anniversary Special and reprised his impression of Vladimir Putin in the pre-taped sketch "The White Potus" in April 2025.

== Personal life ==
On May 13, 2016, Bennett posted a photograph of himself with his girlfriend Jessy Hodges, with a caption saying that they were celebrating their fifth anniversary together. The couple married on August 25, 2018.

In March 2022, Hodges revealed via Instagram that she and Bennett had welcomed a son.

Bennett has been friends with former SNL cast member Kyle Mooney since they were students at the University of Southern California.

== Filmography ==
=== Film ===
Year	Title	Role	Notes
2012	Kill Me Now	Todd	
2013	Beside Still Waters	Tom	
2014	Balls Out	Dick	
2015	The Party is Over	Adam	
2016	Zoolander 2	Geoff Millie	Uncredited
2016	Dean	Trevor	
2016	Sing	Lance	Voice
2016	The Late Bloomer	Luke	
2017	Brigsby Bear	Detective Bander	
2018	The Unicorn	Tyson	
2019	Greener Grass	Nick	
2019	Plus One	Matt	
2019	The Angry Birds Movie 2	Brad Eagleberger, Hank	Voice
2020	Bill & Ted Face the Music	Deacon Logan	
2021	The Mitchells vs. the Machines	Eric, Pal Max Robots	Voice
2023	Nimona	Sir Thoddeus Sureblade	Voice
2024	Y2K	Radio announcer	Voice; uncredited
2024	Unfrosted	Barney Stein	
2025	Superman	Steve Lombard	
2025	Fixed	Sterling	Voice
2025	Teenage Mutant Ninja Turtles: Chrome Alone 2 – Lost in New Jersey	The Announcer	Voice; Short film
2026	Bad Day		Completed
2027	The Last Resort	Nate	Post-production

=== Television ===
Year	Title	Role	Notes
2013	Last Man Standing	Police Sergeant	Episode: "The Fight"; uncredited
2013	Arrested Development	'Straight' Straightbait Actor	Episode: "A New Start"
2013	Axe Cop	Father of Boy	Voice, episode: "The Rabbit Who Broke All the Rules"
2013	Lucas Bros. Moving Co	Repo Man	Voice, episode: "DDT"
2013–2021	Saturday Night Live	Various	Main cast
2015	Big Time in Hollywood, FL	Ricky	Episode: "Rehabilitation"
2017	Master of None	Helicopter Pilot	Voice, episode: "Amarsi Un Po"
2017	Comrade Detective	Nikita Ionescu	2 episodes
2017	Ghosted	Bob	Episode: "Lockdown"
2017–2021	DuckTales	Launchpad McQuack, additional voices	Voice, main cast
2018	We Bare Bears	Brody	Voice, episode: "Bro Brawl"
2019	The Other Two	Jeff	2 episodes
2019	Shrill	Kevin O’Donnell/The Awesome	2 episodes
2019	Sunnyside	Tripp Henson	Episode: "Schnorf Town"
2021	Close Enough	Luc	Voice, episode: "Houseguest From Hell"
2021	M.O.D.O.K.	Austin Van Der Sleet	Voice, recurring role
2021	Santa Inc.	P3 (voice)	Episode: "Spring Awakening"
2021	Saturday Morning All Star Hits!	Thomas	Voice, 4 episodes
2022	The Simpsons	Grayson Mathers	Voice, episode: "The Longest Marge"
2022–2025	Hamster & Gretel	Hamster	Voice, main role
2023	Killing It	Johnny	2 episodes
2023	Office Race	Pat	Television film
2023	I Think You Should Leave with Tim Robinson	Stuart	Episode: "SO NOW EVERY TIME I'M ABOUT TO DO SOMETHING I REALLY WANT TO DO, I ASK MYSELF, 'WAIT A MINUTE, WHAT IS THIS?'"
2023	Rick and Morty	Sheriff	Voice, episode: "How Poopy Got His Poop Back"
2023	Big Mouth	Owen	Voice, 2 episodes
2023, 2025	Chibiverse	Hamster, Launchpad McQuack	Voice, 4 episodes
2024	Is It Cake?	Self	Celebrity judge, episode: "Knock Knock...Cake Service!"
2025	Saturday Night Live 50th Anniversary Special	Groomsman, himself	Television special, NBC
2025	Digman!	Carl Crunch	Voice, episode: "A Sari Sight"
2025	Solar Opposites	Oz	Voice, episode: "The Last Flight of Ariana 1"
2025	Platonic	Wild Card	2 episodes
2026	Mating Season	Arnold	Voice, episode: “The Passion of Raynal Skidski"
2026	Life, Larry and the Pursuit of Unhappiness	Bob Woodward	Episode: "Deepthroat"
TBA	The People v. Gorilla Grodd	Steve Lombard	Main role; Filming
