= Axe Cop (TV series) =

American adult animated series

- Genre: Action; Police comedy
- Based on: Axe Cop by Malachai Nicolle; Ethan Nicolle
- Developed by: Nick Weidenfeld; Judah Miller; Nick Offerman
- Creative director: Ben Jones
- Voices of: Nick Offerman; Ken Marino; Rob Huebel; Megan Mullally; Patton Oswalt; Tyler, The Creator
- Narrated by: Malachai Nicolle (Intro)
- Composers: Charlotte Dawes; Mark Rivers (only in "The Dumb List")
- Country of origin: United States
- Original language: English
- No. of seasons: 2
- No. of episodes: 22

Production
- Executive producers: Nick Offerman; Nick Weidenfeld; Hend Baghdady; Dave Jeser & Matt Silverstein; Rob Anderson (Season 2)
- Producers: Ethan Nicolle; Nick Rutherford (Season 2)
- Editors: Al LeVine; James Atkinson
- Running time: 11 minutes
- Production companies: Friends Night; ADHD Studios

Original release
- Network: Fox
- Release: July 21 – November 30, 2013
- Network: FXX
- Release: April 16 – June 25, 2015

Axe Cop is an American adult animated television series based on the webcomic of the same name that was created by Ethan Nicolle and Malachai Nicolle. It premiered on Fox on July 21, 2013, as a part of the channel's Animation Domination HD programming block. The first season consists of 12 11-minute episodes. The second, broadcast in April–June 2015 on FXX consists of 10 episodes.

== Plot ==
Similar to the webcomic, the series features the eponymous police officer, his partner Flute Cop, and their allies Sockarang, Gray Diamond, Liborg, Bat Warthog Man, and Wexter as they fight various "bad guys" and avoid getting into conflict with the Normal Police.

== Development ==
Axe Cop is a popular webcomic that was created by Ethan Nicolle and his young brother Malachai (five years old at the time of its creation). In playing with Malachai, Ethan found that his brother had a vivid and disjointed imagination, and developed the comic by taking the stories that Malachai told, refining the story to some point without losing Malachai's inventiveness, and drawing the comic around it. The webcomic became very popular, leading to publishing deals with Dark Horse Comics for larger comic-book-sized stories.

The development of the Axe Cop series started from a conversation that Nick Offerman had with the Animation Domination High-Def producer Nick Weidenfeld some years before the program's debut. Offerman talked with Weidenfeld about the Axe Cop comic and stated that if a show was to be made from it, Offerman wanted to participate. Weidenfeld took the idea to Phil Lord and Chris Miller, also fans of the webcomic, and they asked Weidenfeld to lead the project, stating that it "has to be emotional", in Weidenfeld's words. As Lord and Miller were working on 21 Jump Street at the time, they suggested Weidenfeld turn to Judah Miller for directional help. Weidenfeld and Miller arranged for a retreat along with writers and creators of Drawn Together Dave Jeser and Matt Silverstein, voice actors Ken Marino, Patton Oswalt, and Offerman, and the comic creator Ethan Nicolle, where the group discussed their favorite parts of the comic and how to translate it into a show, keeping all the moments that are "100-percent pure Malachai". As they started to write some of the show's plots, they found themselves with narrative dead ends; Ethan used these moments to contact Malachai, explain the story so far and have Malachai provide the missing narrative. Malachai also provided additional advice during the animation process for the shorts when he visited the studios, such as insisting that Zombie Island be set in space, a tangent that the writers and animators quickly agreed with for its illogical humorous value and included in the short.

== Episodes ==
Season	Episodes	Originally released		
Season	Episodes	First released	Last released	Network
1	12	July 21, 2013	November 30, 2013	Fox
2	10	April 16, 2015	June 25, 2015	FXX

=== Season 1 (2013) ===
The initial episode order for the series was six. On August 1, 2013, Fox ordered six additional episodes, bringing the season to a total of 12 episodes.

No. overall	No. in season	Title	Written by	Original release date	Prod. code	US viewers (millions)
1	1	"Night Mission: Stealing Friends Back"	Dave Jeser & Matt Silverstein	July 21, 2013	103	2.42
The King of Bad Guys has stolen all of Bat Warthog Man's friends. Axe Cop leads a night mission to Invisible Bad Guy Planet #2 to get them back where he and Bat Warthog Man meet Grey Diamond, Army Chihuahua, and Liborg while learning about their history along the way. Axe Cop's plan to rescue the captive friends involves poisoned soda on the King of Bad Guy's minions and a Dinosaur Horn rented from the Dinosaur Horn Planet that summons dinosaurs from Dinosaur Planet.
2	2	"Zombie Island... in Space"	Dave Jeser and Matt Silverstein	July 27, 2013	106	1.50
During World War II, Adolf Hitler and his soldiers kidnap an English chemist named Chemist M. where Adolf Hitler forces him to create an army of unstoppable zombies on Zombie Island in Space for the safety of his daughter Isabella M. In the present, Isabella M. enlists Axe Cop, Flute Cop, and Wexter to rescue her father from Zombie Island in Space. Upon arrival, they find Chemist M as a zombie following his search for a formula that turns zombies good and also uncover a plan by Chemist M.'s sentient poop named Dr. Doodoo who plans to marry the Queen of England and make everyone poop themselves.
3	3	"An American Story"	Dave Jeser and Matt Silverstein	August 3, 2013	104	1.10
At the Independence Day picnic, Axe Cop tells Flute Cop, Sockarang, Bat Warthog Man, and the people present at the picnic the story of how his ancestor Book Cop did battle with the King of London England to retrieve the stolen Secret Attack Almanac during the American Revolutionary War.
4	4	"Babysitting Uni-Baby"	Dave Jeser and Matt Silverstein	August 10, 2013	105	1.20
Flute Cop and his wife Anita are on vacation in Hawaii and Axe Cop is looking after Uni-Baby (whose unicorn horn possesses great magical power) while they're away. Upon creating robot duplicates of themselves to watch over Uni-Baby, Axe Cop and Sockarang take a quick trip to Magic Planet (a planet of magicians) and find themselves having to fight off the Magic Cops while meeting Chubby Doll. Afterwards, Axe Cop, Sockarang, and Chubby Doll end up fighting the Axe Cop Robot and Sockarang Robot when they turn evil.
5	5	"Birthday Month"	Dave Jeser and Matt Silverstein	August 17, 2013	102	1.19
Axe Cop's birthday (which he's celebrating all month) starts off badly when he inadvertently kills some good mermen (whose smiles he mistook for evil smiles) while at the beach. But it improves when he has the chance to kill the man who killed Axe Cop's parents.... Bad Santa (the evil brother of Good Santa). Upon arriving at South Pole Planet, Axe Cop must fight Bad Santa before he can raid Heaven and overthrow God.
6	6	"The Rabbit Who Broke All the Rules"	Nick Rutherford	August 24, 2013	101	1.16
To raise money for his headquarters, Axe Cop becomes a foster father for a mysterious young boy. While Axe Cop, Flute Cop, Gray Diamond, Sockarang, Liborg, and Wexter run a camp for young children and dinosaurs, Axe Cop is unaware that the boy is possessed by the ghost of Axe Cop's first kill.... an unconventional rabbit who broke the rabbit rules by walking on its hind legs and eating coconuts.
7	7	"No More Bad Guys"	Dave Jeser and Matt Silverstein	November 2, 2013	108	1.17
Axe Cop has killed all the bad guys on Earth following his fight with evil dinosaurs and Psydrozon. This means only one thing: Axe Cop and his team of crime fighters need to find new jobs. At the same time, Baby Man gets a hold of Uni-Baby's horn following Axe Cop's fight with Psydrozon and wishes that he was a bad guy so that he can get even with Axe Cop for rejecting him at the tryouts for his group. Flute Cop also has to deal with shapeshifting forms against his will.
8	8	"Super Axe"	Nick Rutherford	November 9, 2013	109	1.18
While on vacation, Axe Cop must convince his old college buddy Super Axe to go on one last adventure to save the world by traveling back in time to stop the Red-Headed Woman (whose sons were killed by Axe Cop) from making all life on Earth evil at the beginning of time.
9	9	"When Night Creatures Attack"	Dave Jeser and Matt Silverstein	November 16, 2013	107	1.12
Axe Cop, Gray Diamond, and Wexter must track down the Sun Thieves Ben and Scoot before the world is torn apart by Night Creatures that are abducting babies. Meanwhile, Flute Cop and Anita rescue Uni-Baby from the Night Creatures.
10	10	"28 Days Before"	Nick Rutherford	November 23, 2013	110	1.11
It's Thanksgiving and Axe Cop hasn't been seen since Halloween following their fight with Turkey Turkey (who had stolen all the Halloween candy) as his usual Thanksgiving duties haven't been performed. While wondering where Axe Cop is, Flute Cop tells Sockarang, Gray Diamond, Liborg, Bat Warthog Man, Baby Man, and The Wrestler about his and Axe Cop's fight with Turkey Turkey on Thanksgiving Planet.
11	11	"Taxi Cop"	Dave Jeser and Matt Silverstein	November 30, 2013	112	1.10
Young Axe Cop and Flute Cop grow up to run a taxi company, just falling short of their childhood dreams of becoming crime fighters. They become cops where they save Uni-Man from some robbers. Axe Cop and Flute Cop then come to the aid of Uni-Man when Fatsozon plans to detonate the bombs within Earth from his location on Uni-Planet.
12	12	"The Dumb List"	Nick Weidenfeld	November 30, 2013	111	1.09
Following the slaying of Evil Rhino Man (whose horn can metamorphose anything into gold), Axe Cop is forced to let a girl join the team (even though he has put all girls on the "Dumb List") following some bad press upon beating up a group of cheerleaders called the Beautiful Girly Bobs (who Axe Cop rejected their memberships for his team). He ends up enlisting a fairy named Best Fairy Ever from "Fairy Wars" who comes in handy at the time when the leader of the Beautiful Girly Bobs plans her revenge on Axe Cop.

=== Season 2 (2015) ===
No. overall	No. in season	Title	Directed by	Written by	Original release date	Prod. code	US viewers (millions)
13	1	"Night Mission: The Moon"	Douglas Einar Olsen	Nick Rutherford	April 16, 2015	201	N/A
Axe Cop takes Flute Cop on his first Night Mission where they encounter the Vampire Man Baby Kid. Upon befriending the Vampire Man Baby Kid, Axe Cop, Flute Cop, and Wexter head to the Moon to confront his vampire father that bit him where they come across a plot by his Moon Person mother to get the Moon to the Super Moon phase so that the Moon People can metamorphose into Super Werewolves and attack Earth.
14	2	"Heads Will Roll"	Aldin Baroza, Chase Conley, and Douglas Einar Olsen	M.E. Willis	April 23, 2015	202	N/A
Following the fight against Goo-rilla with the help of some Ice Vikings from the year 1066, Axe Cop is arrested for breaking the laws and is incarcerated in the local prison. Once there, the creepy warden allows Axe Cop to chop the heads off of the inmates. Flute Cop later discovers that the warden is using the heads to grow his own henchmen so that he can sell them to every supervillain that needs loyal henchmen.
15	3	"Bald Cop"	Aldin Baroza, Chase Conley, Mike McCraw, and Douglas Einar Olsen	Nick Rutherford	April 30, 2015	203	N/A
Axe Cop goes into hiding upon receiving a letter from Hell Chicken stating that he knows his secret of wearing his hat to cover his baldness and flees to Secret Town. With Axe Cop out of commission, Hell Chicken begins his plan to cause the Hell Chicken Zombie Apocalypse. With help from a dream involving his childhood hero Uncle Axe, Axe Cop must return to action to free Flute Cop, Sockarang, Gray Diamond, Liborg, and Wexter from the effects of the Hell Chicken Zombie Apocalypse.
16	4	"The Center of the Ocean"	Douglas Einar Olsen, Chase Conley, and Mike McCraw	Mike McMahan	May 7, 2015	204	N/A
A merman known as the King of All Time has invited Axe Cop to his party at the center of the ocean where there will be water-made food served. When aliens infiltrate the party and capture the King of All Time's daughter Water Queen, Axe Cop must work with the King of All Time's adoptive son Lobster Man to thwart the aliens' plan to drown the Sand People of Sand Planet and take out their leader who is someone from Lobster Man's past. With the lack of the ocean on Earth, Flute Cop and Gray Diamond must prevent a war between the sharks and the tigers.
17	5	"Mark Frankenstein"	Chase Conley	Greg Lloyd Brown	May 14, 2015	205	N/A
In Ancient Alabama, the priests work to keep the Gray Diamond from falling into the hands of Lord Diamond, which ends with the pyramid self-destructing. Upon not having a catchphrase or any powers, Gray Diamond leaves Axe Cop's team and pawns the Gray Diamond. Taking advantage of this, the mummy of Lord Diamond from the Museum's Ancient Alabama exhibit claims the Gray Diamond and starts using its powers to drain the souls out of everyone in the city. Now it's up to Gray Diamond to save Axe Cop and defeat Lord Diamond.
18	6	"President Cop"	Aldin Baroza	Mike McMahan	May 21, 2015	206	N/A
Axe Cop has become the President of the World and receives gifts from various people during the 1,000,000 years of peace. The Brilliant Evil Scientist manipulates Junior Cobbb into bringing Axe Cop to Talking Gorilla Planet so that the Brilliant Evil Scientist can kill Axe Cop with his Robot Axe Cop and have it take over Earth. Once that was done, the Evil Brilliant Scientist is left unaware of Axe Cop's backup plan. Note: The Miley Cyrus song "Wrecking Ball" is played during the end of the episode.
19	7	"Axe Cop Saves God"	Chase Conley and Douglas Einar Olsen	Martin Garner and Nick Offerman	May 28, 2015	207	N/A
Following the bad guy massacre with his latest victim being Dr. Maracas, Axe Cop joins Flute Cop, Sockarang, and Gray Diamond at the restaurant. Upon trying ham when the restaurant was out of birthday cake, Axe Cop sets up a ham restaurant. Some days later, Axe Cop, Flute Cop, Sockarang, and Gray Diamon meet villain-turned-hero Mr. Chicken Chickenslice who enlists their help to keep Satan from invading Heaven. While helping out in the defense against Heaven, Axe Cop meets God and the angel form of Axe Cop's real father.
20	8	"The Ultimate Mate"	Chase Conley and Douglas Einar Olsen	Martin Garner and Nick Offerman	June 11, 2015	208	N/A
In order to win the Ultimate Space Trampoline in the Couple's Skating Rink competition, Axe Cop goes to Axe Planet where he forms a tentative partnership with Axe Girl for the Couple's Skating Rink competition. Afterwards, they go through couple's therapy where the elderly couple that orchestrated their pairing wanted them to help dispose of an evil Moon Head (which was the result of horse measles) that is ravaging their planet Tutukaka.
21	9	"Night Mission: The Extincter"	Chase Conley and Douglas Einar Olsen	Martin Garner and Nick Offerman	June 19, 2015	209	N/A
While on a Night Mission with Flute Cop, Axe Cop defeats some bad hunters with his owl army that were targeting the last raccoon and finds out that they are helping Extincter in wiping out every animal so that Extincter can inherit their powers. Axe Cop discovers that Extincter's next target is Bigfoot as Axe Cop works with Bigfoot and the Mysterious Beast Force (consisting of the Chupacabra, the Jackalope, and the Loch Ness Monster) to defeat Extincter and restore every animal that became extinct.
22	10	"Baboons Rising"	Douglas Einar Olsen	Ethan Nicolle	June 25, 2015	210	N/A
There is an uprising of baboons which led to the death of President Towzerd as Axe Cop enlists the Almighty Bear and his bear army of Bearopolis to help fight the baboon army. When the baboon army plans to target Secret President Larry, Axe Cop, Flute Cop, and the Almighty Bear must enter Secret President Larry's bloodstream in order to confront the baboons' leader the Almighty Baboon. Note: Before finding out that Axe Cop has rallied the Bears to help fight the Baboons, Flute Cop thought the Bears were also attacking where he called it "Bearmageddon". Bearmageddon was the name of Ethan Nicolle's other comic series.

== Voice cast ==
- Nick Offerman – Axe Cop/Axey Smartist
- Ken Marino – Flute Cop/Flutey Smartist, Fife Cop (ep. 3)
- Rob Huebel – Gray Diamond/Mark Frankenstein
- Megan Mullally – Anita, Mrs. G. (ep. 1), Joanie (ep. 1), Isabella M. (ep. 2), Queen of England (ep. 2), Book Cop's Mom (ep. 3), Gobber Smartist (ep. 5), Tracy (ep. 8), Waitress (ep. 9)
- Patton Oswalt – Sockarang, Stockarang (ep. 3)
- Tyler, The Creator – Liborg, Chief of the Normal Police (ep. 7)

=== Additional voices ===
- James Adomian – Book Cop's Dad (ep. 3), Magic Cop (ep. 4)
- Jane Adams – Red-Headed Woman (ep. 8)
- Dave "Gruber" Allen –
- Dee Bradley Baker – Vampire Man Baby Kid (ep. 13), Baboons (ep. 22)
- Maria Bamford – Newscaster (ep. 15), Anita (ep. 22)
- Jonathan Banks – Book Cop (ep. 3), Radio DJ (ep. 4)
- Raymond J. Barry – Bad Santa (ep. 5)
- Todd Barry – Dinosaur Horn Store Salesman (ep. 1), Todd (ep. 6)
- Stephanie Beatriz –
- Lake Bell – Axe Girl (ep. 20)
- Beck Bennett – Boy's Father (ep. 6)
- Andrew Daly –
- Al Yankovic –
- Betsy Brandt –
- Andre Braugher – Lobster Man (ep. 16)
- Alison Brie – Beautiful Girly Bobs (ep. 12)
- Clancy Brown – Soldier (ep. 17), Reporter (ep. 18), Junior Cobbb (ep. 18), Satan (ep. 19), Bigfoot (ep. 21), Bad Hunter (ep. 21)
- Jerrod Carmichael – Guy on Car (ep. 4)
- Michael Chiklis –
- Olivia Cooke – Loch Ness Monster (ep. 21)
- Charley Damski – Alien Lab Worker (ep. 1)
- Sam Elliott – Axe Cop's Dad (ep. 19)
- Giancarlo Esposito – Army Chihuahua
- Dan Harmon – Magic Show Audience Member (ep. 4)
- Dennis Haysbert – Frog (ep. 8)
- Jared Harris – King of England (ep. 3)
- Ryan Hurst –
- Dave Jeser –
- Jewel – Tear Sparrow (ep. 16)
- Vincent Kartheiser – Bat Warthog Man
- Udo Kier – Warden (ep. 14)
- Jemima Kirke – Water Queen (ep. 16)
- Heather Lawless – Dr. Miles (ep. 22)
- Al LeVine – President Towzerd (ep. 15, 22)
- Luenell – Waitress (ep. 20)
- Michael Madsen – Baby Man
- Hunter Maki – Young Flutey Smartist (ep. 11)
- Jack McBrayer – Mr. Chicken Chickenslice (ep. 19)
- Cullen McCarthy – Young Axey Smartist (ep. 11), Young Ray (ep. 11)
- Jack McGee – Turkey Turkey (ep. 10)
- Scoot McNairy – Scoot (ep. 9, 15)
- Ben Mendelsohn – Ben (ep. 9, 15)
- Chris Messina –
- Alfred Molina – Vampire Man Baby Kid's Father (ep. 13), Brilliant Evil Scientist (ep. 18)
- Ethan Nicolle – Chubby Doll (ep. 4), Merman (ep. 5)
- Malachai Nicolle – Opening Narration
- Mike O'Malley – Ray (ep. 11)
- Jordan Peele – Super Axe (ep. 8)
- Richard Riehle – Tutukaka Male (ep. 20), Science Corp Scientist (ep. 22), Secret President Larry (ep. 22)
- Alex Rubin – Kid (ep. 6)
- Kristen Schaal – God (ep. 19)
- Peter Serafinowicz – Uni-Man, Dr. Doo Doo (ep. 2), Adolf Hitler (ep. 2), Chemist M. (ep. 2), Redcoat (ep. 3), Boy (ep. 6), Rabbit Ghost (ep. 6), King of All Time (ep. 16), Wizard Artist Rabbit (ep. 18)
- Matt Silverstein –
- June Squibb – Tutukaka Female (ep. 20)
- David Strathairn – Extincter (ep. 21)
- Tara Strong – Refugee Woman (ep. 22)
- Valery Summey – Poison (ep. 4)
- Joe Unger – Police Officer (ep. 9), Farmer (ep. 10)
- Deborah Ann Woll – Best Fairy Ever (ep. 12)
- Dwight Yoakam –
