= How to Lose Weight in 4 Easy Steps! =

2016 American short film

How to Lose Weight in 4 Easy Steps! is a 2016 American short comedy-drama film directed by Ben Berman and written by Aaron Bleyaert. The film stars Beck Bennett as the lead character, and premiered at the 2016 Sundance Film Festival.

== Plot ==
The film follows a heartbroken man, working as a mattress salesman, who attempts to cope with a difficult breakup by radically changing his lifestyle. The film begins by listing the first two "easy steps" to lose weight (avoiding beer, portion control), but the true focus is on the third step: "Have your heart broken."

The narrative then add more details and describes the protagonist's year-long commitment to the gym, using his emotional pain and self-loathing as the primary fuel for intense physical activity. The process is depicted as difficult, isolating, and painful, but eventually leads to physical transformation and the start of a new relationship.

The final, anticlimactic "fourth easy step" is revealed at the very end, serving as a comedic conclusion to the emotional journey.

The film is based on a popular written essay by screenwriter Aaron Bleyaert.

== Production ==
The film was shot over two separate weekends, with a planned three-and-a-half-month gap in between the filming periods. This gap was designed to accommodate the physical transformation of lead actor Beck Bennett. Bennett, known for his work in Saturday Night Live, committed to losing weight for the role, an idea he pitched to the production team. He successfully lost 30 pounds (approximately 13.6 kg) between the first and second phase of shooting, allowing the physical change shown in the short film to be authentic. Writer Aaron Bleyaert noted that the actor's dedication was "quite a sight to behold" and added significant weight to the story's theme of transformation.

== Release and Reception ==
How to Lose Weight in 4 Easy Steps! premiered at the Sundance Film Festival in January 2016 as part of the Short Film Program. The film was later screened at other major festivals, including the 2016 Florida Film Festival as a Florida Premiere.

Short of the Week praised the adaptation of Bleyaert's original text, noting that director Ben Berman "manages to translate Bleyaert's words to the screen in a way that expands upon the strengths of the original rather than mimicking it." The review also highlighted Beck Bennett's "low-key revelation" performance as the main character. The film gained significant traction online after its release on YouTube by the JASH channel, accumulating over 13 million views.
