= ADHD Shorts =

- Written by: Heather Anne Campbell
- Voices of: Sam Brown; Heather Anne Campbell; Rich Fulcher; Stephen Hale; Trevor Moore; John O'Hurley; James Pumphrey; Peter Serafinowicz; Matty Smith; Angela Trimbur
- Country of origin: United States
- Original language: English

Production
- Executive producers: Nick Weidenfeld; Hend Baghdady
- Running time: 11 minutes
- Production companies: Friends Night; ADHD Studios

Original release
- Network: Fox (United States); Citytv (Canada)
- Release: July 27, 2013 – February 26, 2016

ADHD Shorts (also known as Animation Domination High-Def Shorts) is an animated interstitial program that is part of the Animation Domination High-Def block.

== Plot ==
This is a series of animated shorts used as interstitial programming between episodes. Most of them are in sketches form with a few animated songs. Writing is primarily done by Heather Anne Campbell with most songs performed by Heather herself or by vocalist Liz Beebe.

== Recurring shorts ==
The following are recurring shorts in this interstitial program:

=== ADHD U ===
Short for ADHD University and serving as a parody of Schoolhouse Rock!, this is a series of shorts that contain songs about different organizations and topics not often discussed in Schoolhouse Rock! Nate Clark, Matthew Davis, and Katie Molinaro provide the singing voices for the songs.

=== Desert Folk ===
A series of shorts about the Desert Folk boys consisting of an anthropomorphic lizard named Lizard (voiced by Trevor Moore), a rattlesnake named Snake (voiced by Sam Brown), and an anthropomorphic scorpion named Scorpion (voiced by James Pumphrey) as they live in the desert and have various misadventures.

=== Gothball ===
In a spin-off of Stone Quackers, the shorts feature a bicolor cat named Gothball (voiced by John O'Hurley) as he interacts with his owner Dottie (voiced by Heather Lawless), Whit (voiced by Whitmer Thomas), Clay (voiced by Clay Tatum), and Barf (voiced by Ben Jones). The cat was originally named Gothfield in Stone Quackers. Like Stone Quackers, these shorts were created by Ben Jones who also provided the opening narration for these shorts.

=== Hamsters on Rollerskates ===
A series of shorts that involve hamsters who wear rollerskates and have non sequitur conversations about just about anything. These shorts were created by Matty Smith, and voiced by Matty Smith and Jack Allison.

=== Hulk ===
A parody of Hulk from Marvel Comics that depicts Bruce Banner (voiced by Stephen Hale) going through mundane activities upon turning into Hulk (also voiced by Stephen Hale) like running errands and joining a gym which always results in Hulk causing damages during these times. When ADHD stopped production, the shorts were continued on AOK.

=== Old Man ===
A series of shorts where an old man is paired up with different superhero groups against their villains which always ends with the old man dying of old age.

=== Scientifically Accurate ===
A series of theme songs of different characters that are depicted if they were scientifically accurate and in real life. The songs are written and performed by Heather Anne Campbell.

=== School Girl Crush ===
In this parody of schoolgirl-themed anime like Revolutionary Girl Utena, Project A-ko, Oniisama e..., Sailor Moon, My Bride Is a Mermaid, My-HiME, Kill la Kill, Ouran High School Host Club, Attack on Titan: Junior High, and Sakura Trick, Kim Kimiko (voiced by Heather Anne Campbell) is a poor transfer student who discovers the real meaning of power when she battles an Austrian rich girl named Lucia Goch (voiced by Angela Trimbur) as they each discover that schoolgirls get their powers from kissing each other by using military robots in order to defeat an evil teacher that uses his students as guinea pigs by using a virtual reality game. The series ran from January 22, 2014 to December 21, 2015. It concluded after five episodes.

=== Songs You Didn't Know Had Lyrics ===
A series of songs that have lyrics written for them. The songs are written and performed by Heather Anne Campbell.

=== The Adventures of OG Sherlock Kush ===
A series of shorts featuring the weed-smoking detective OG Sherlock Kush (voiced by Peter Serafinowicz) and his assistant Watson (voiced by Rich Fulcher). Besides the shorts being a parody of Sherlock Holmes, these shorts were created by Joseph Carnegie with The Lucas Brothers as executive producers. The series ran from January 1, 2015 to February 26, 2016.
