= Saturday Morning All Star Hits! =

TV series

- Genre: Live-action/Animation; Comedy/Parody; Variety/Sketch comedy Surreal humour
- Created by: Ben Jones; Kyle Mooney
- Directed by: Ben Jones (animated segments); Dave McCary (live-action segments)
- Starring: Kyle Mooney; Geraldine Viswanathan; Dylan Sprouse; Rae Dawn Chong; Nathan Fielder
- Voices of: Kyle Mooney; Pamela Adlon; Fred Armisen; Eric Bauza; Maurice LaMarche; Kevin Michael Richardson; Beck Bennett; Kate Lyn Sheil; Cree Summer; Frank Welker; Chris Redd; Paul Rudd; Emma Stone; Ben Jones
- Composer: Timothy Cleary
- Country of origin: United States
- Original language: English
- No. of seasons: 1
- No. of episodes: 8

Production
- Executive producers: Ben Jones; Kyle Mooney; Dave McCary; Scott Greenberg; Joel Kuwahara; Lorne Michaels; Andrew Singer; Scott Gairdner; Craig Hartin; Katy Jenson
- Producers: Aubrey Danielson; Carl Fieler; Simon Gibney; Andrew Grissom; James Merrill; Max Minor
- Editors: Andrew Lainhart; Zach Zdziebko
- Camera setup: Single-camera
- Running time: 19–28 minutes
- Production companies: Ben Jones Studio, Inc. Bento Box Entertainment; Broadway Video; Universal Television

Original release
- Network: Netflix
- Release: December 10, 2021

Saturday Morning All Star Hits! (S.M.A.S.H.!) is an American adult animated sketch comedic television series created by Kyle Mooney and Ben Jones. Produced by Universal Television, the show is a parody of Saturday-morning cartoon programming blocks from the 1980s and early 1990s, including a mix of live-action and animation segments. It was released on Netflix on December 10, 2021.

== Plot ==
The show parodies various programming blocks and cartoons from the 1980s and early 1990s, such as Chip and Pepper's Cartoon Madness, Fox Kids, and The Disney Afternoon, framed by an eponymous show called S.M.A.S.H.! for short. It is hosted by twin brothers Skip and Treybor (parodies of Chip and Pepper), both played by Mooney. They introduce various cartoon shows and have brief conversations between shows. The cartoons include:

- Randy, a show about an anthropomorphic teenage dinosaur who falls into depression and alcoholism following a breakup with his firefighter girlfriend, before heading to music college where he befriends a group of teenagers. Randy is a spoof of Denver, the Last Dinosaur.
- The Create-A-Crittles, a show about four magical creatures secretly living in the backyard shed of a yuppie graphic designer and his wife. Crittle Glitter, a euphemism for cocaine, is prominently featured throughout the show. Create-A-Crittles parodies such shows as Care Bears, Alvin and the Chipmunks, and Popples.
- Strongimals, a show loosely parodying ThunderCats, Teenage Mutant Ninja Turtles, and other action cartoons of the era. The show is later retitled as Skip and the Strongimals, radically shifting its focus to Skip and his "uh... subs?" catchphrase as a result of Skip's rise to greater fame (which in itself is a reference to show The Real Ghostbusters and its eventual focus on the popular character Slimer).
- Pro Bros, a show created by Ethan Rash who is known as the less prominent brother of controversial movie star/singer Johnny Rash, parodying ProStars and other series where pro athletes play themselves (albeit the pilot premiering in prime time as opposed to Saturday morning). The show's antagonist, "Ronnie $elfish," and his drug habit are an allegory for Ethan's brother Johnny.
- Lil' Bruce, an animated comedy about comedian Bruce Chandling's "crazy childhood" similar to Howie Mandel's Bobby's World. The series ends up a failed pilot due to live-action Bruce's excessive narration and a too-heavy plotline about Bruce's father leaving him and his mother when he was young.
- All Cartoon Stars Say Don't Say Shut Up, a public service announcement in the format of Cartoon All-Stars to the Rescue warning against the consequences of saying "shut up" to one's elders. Guest stars include "President of the Country" Barbara Barone (loosely based on Hillary Clinton and Tipper Gore, particularly their advocacy campaigns for media censorship) and famous pop singer Nuance (based on Paula Abdul).
- Slingers, a toy-based show parodying the animated pilot The Legend of the Hawaiian Slammers.
- Others include brief clips from The Meeps (satirizing The Smurfs), Crittle Littles (satirizing Muppet Babies and Kingdom Chums), the character Puppy the Dog (satirizing classic cartoons), Dr. Von Duck (satirizing DuckTales and The Simpsons), Egyptian Jazz Cats (satirizing music-band cartoons such as Josie and the Pussycats), Lottie (a live-action teen sitcom satirizing Blossom) and Intimate Compromise: Casino Nights Seductions an R-rated live-action film parodying such films as Basic Instinct, True Lies and L.A. Confidential and its animated counterpart Intimate Compromise: Casino Nights Seductions: The Animated Series (which satirizes the process of turning R-rated movies into cartoons such as Robocop, Rambo: The Force of Freedom, Toxic Crusaders, Police Academy and Conan the Adventurer) as seen with numerous clips from home movies, news shows and commercials promoting Nextronico's Mega Mitten (spoofing Nintendo's infamous Power Glove), Rude Cubes (Madballs), Sonic Yum gum (spoofing Bubble Yum and "For You, Not Them" Bubble Tape ads), diet sodas, sneakers and submarine sandwiches.

Throughout the episodes, Treybor, who grows jealous of Skip, eventually quits S.M.A.S.H.! because he feels overshadowed by Skip. In the season finale, Treybor confronts Skip during a live broadcast to vent his frustrations, before their mother shows up and urges them to reconcile while introducing them to their long-lost triplet brother, Corbee (Nathan Fielder). Skip leaves S.M.A.S.H.!, after which all three triplets become VJs on Monday Early Afternoon Rock Song Hits, which shows sludge rock (grunge rock) music videos geared towards older teenagers and young adults.

Starting in episode 4, breaking news interruptions chronicle the disappearance of Lottie co-stars Lottie Wolfe and Sean Benjamin and the subsequent police investigation; Wolfe's boyfriend and fellow teen sensation Johnny Rash is initially arrested and tried for their presumed deaths (in a nationally televised trial a la O. J. Simpson), during which Benjamin's body is found, but a jury acquits Rash due to matching left-and-right shoe prints being found at the scene, contradicting Rash's fashion statement of always wearing mismatched shoes (reminiscent of the backward clothes worn by Kris Kross). Though it proved futile in court, evidence against Rash was found by a 9-year-old S.M.A.S.H.! superfan named Katherine Logan (implied to be the one who is switching tapes of S.M.A.S.H.! off-screen), who spotted a blooper in the Skip and the Strongimals Movie in which an unidentified figure (thought to be Johnny Rash himself) threw an athletic shoe matching the crime scene into the D'ahai Sea.

Running gags include the names of animation studios GIK (a play on DIC Entertainment), Herb Whibley (Walt Disney), and Polystar (a spoof of Carolco), numerous appearances of sub sandwiches and catchphrases like "zuzzy zazz" and "uh... subs?".

== Cast ==
- Kyle Mooney as Skip and Treybor, Bruce Chandling, Randy on Randy, Brusho on Create-A-Crittles, various other characters
- Eric Bauza as Tigor on Strongimals and Pasto on Create-A-Crittles
- Geraldine Viswanathan as Lottie Wolfe
- Emma Stone as Heather on Randy
- Pamela Adlon as Digit on Randy, Argie B. on Create-A-Crittles, various other characters
- Cree Summer as Scizzi and Ruth on Create-A-Crittles, Rhonda on Skip and the Strongimals, various other characters
- Dylan Sprouse as Sean Benjamin
- Beck Bennett as Thomas on Randy and various other characters
- Maurice LaMarche as various characters
- Chris Redd as Denny Jones on Pro Bros
- Paul Rudd as David on Create-A-Crittles
- Ben Jones
- Scott Gairdner
- Grey Griffin
- Fred Armisen as Rye Henders on Pro Bros
- Kate Lyn Sheil
- Carlos Alazraqui as JJ Henders on ProBros, Papa Meep on The Meeps, various other characters
- Kevin Michael Richardson as Vulgaris on Cartoon All Stars Say Don't Say Shut Up and Mo Jones on Pro Bros
- Frank Welker as Ronnie $elfish on Pro Bros
- Rae Dawn Chong
- Nathan Fielder as Corbee
- Amy Grabow
- Lela Brown as Nuance
- Kristin Lindquist as President of the Country Barbara Barone
- Taharka Welcome as DJ Swish

== Episodes ==
No.	Title	Directed by	Written by	Original release date	Prod. code
1	"Tape 1: SCHOOL"	Ben Jones & Dave McCary	Kyle Mooney, Ben Jones, Dave McCary, Scott Gairdner	December 10, 2021	101
Twin hosts Skip and Treybor develop a sibling rivalry. Teenage dinosaur Randy gets dumped. David hides his friendship with the cute Create-A-Crittles.
2	"Tape 2: LOST"	Ben Jones & Dave McCary	Kyle Mooney, Ben Jones, Dave McCary, Scott Gairdner	December 10, 2021	102
Randy applies to Music College. David's pals colorize his logo. "The Strongimals" visit Earth and meet Skip, whose cameo role is mocked by Treybor.
3	"Tape 3: ZOO"	Ben Jones & Dave McCary	Kyle Mooney, Ben Jones, Dave McCary, Scott Gairdner	December 10, 2021	103
Skip's fame grows, along with Treybor's jealousy. Randy makes a friend at Music College. The Create-A-Crittles join David's corporate creative team.
4	"Tape 4: SMASH!"	Ben Jones & Dave McCary	Kyle Mooney, Ben Jones, Dave McCary, Scott Gairdner	December 10, 2021	104
The show gets a new studio. Skip now stars in "The Strongimals." A comedian presents "Lil' Bruce." The Crittles — and David's marriage — split up.
5	"Tape 5: NEWS"	Ben Jones & Dave McCary	Kyle Mooney, Ben Jones, Dave McCary, Scott Gairdner	December 10, 2021	105
An episode of "Primeline" profiles rising star Skip and tracks a startling disappearance. The "Pro Bros" live in the shadows of their famous brothers.
6	"Tape 6: MOVIE"	Ben Jones & Dave McCary	Kyle Mooney, Ben Jones, Dave McCary, Scott Gairdner	December 10, 2021	106
Treybor pays a humiliating visit to the set of Skip's new film. The Pro Bros mount a rescue mission. A disappearance becomes a homicide investigation.
7	"Tape 7: DANGER"	Ben Jones & Dave McCary	Kyle Mooney, Ben Jones, Dave McCary, Scott Gairdner	December 10, 2021	107
The stars of the Saturday-morning lineup join the president and pop star Nuance to address a serious social issue: the disrespectful phrase, "Shut up!"
8	"Tape 8: LIVE!"	Ben Jones & Dave McCary	Kyle Mooney, Ben Jones, Dave McCary, Scott Gairdner	December 10, 2021	108
The live premiere of "Skip and the Strongimals" is interrupted by dysfunctional family dynamics and the pending results of a TV star's murder trial.

== Production ==
The show was co-created by Mooney (who plays both Skip and Treybor), director Dave McCary (directing the live action segments), and animator Ben Jones, best known for his work on the Cartoon Network series The Problem Solverz and the FXX animated series Stone Quackers, and the Emmy Award-winning sitcom Bob's Burgers. It is executive produced by Saturday Night Live creator Lorne Michaels under Broadway Video.

== Reception ==
Saturday Morning All Star Hits! has received mostly positive reviews from critics for its "hilariously sharp edge" on 90s nostalgia. On the review aggregator website Rotten Tomatoes, Saturday Morning All Star Hits! has an approval rating of 89% based on 9 reviews, with an average rating of 8.2/10.

== See also ==
- Animation in the United States in the television era
- Pop culture fiction
- Postmodern television
