= Brigsby Bear =

2017 film by Dave McCary

- Theatrical release poster
- Directed by: Dave McCary
- Screenplay by: Kevin Costello; Kyle Mooney
- Story by: Kyle Mooney
- Produced by: Mark Roberts; Al Di; Phil Lord Christopher Miller; Will Allegra; Andy Samberg; Jorma Taccone; Akiva Schaffer; Billy Rosenberg
- Starring: Kyle Mooney; Claire Danes; Mark Hamill; Greg Kinnear; Andy Samberg; Matt Walsh; Michaela Watkins
- Cinematography: Christian Sprenger
- Edited by: Jacob Craycroft
- Music by: David Wingo
- Production companies: 3311 Productions; YL Pictures; Lord Miller Productions; Lonely Island Classics
- Distributed by: Sony Pictures Classics
- Release dates: January 23, 2017 (Sundance); July 28, 2017 (United States)
- Running time: 97 minutes
- Country: United States
- Language: English
- Box office: $681,632

Brigsby Bear is a 2017 American comedy-drama film directed by Dave McCary in his feature directorial debut, written by Kevin Costello and Kyle Mooney, and starring Mooney, Claire Danes, Mark Hamill, Greg Kinnear, Andy Samberg, Matt Walsh, and Michaela Watkins. It tells the story of a man abducted as a baby and raised in isolation in a bunker where he obsessed over a children's television program centered on a character named Brigsby Bear; after being rescued by the authorities and realizing that the show had been made for him only by one of his captors, his fascination leads him to finish the storyline himself.

The film was inspired by McCary, Mooney, and Costello's middle school experiences making short films together, with a story stemming from Mooney's fascination with 1980s children's shows. Principal photography took place in Utah during Mooney and McCary's break from working on Saturday Night Live in 2016. The film premiered at the Sundance Film Festival on January 23, 2017, and was theatrically released by Sony Pictures Classics on July 28. Upon release, Brigsby Bear received generally positive reviews from critics, who praised the script, direction, cast, and art design, and also commended the film's sentimental tone.

== Plot ==
James is forced to live in an underground bunker with his parents Ted and April Mitchum. While Ted tells James that the outside world is dangerous, James often sees him leaving the bunker with a gas mask on. James is fascinated with an educational children's show titled Brigsby Bear Adventures, centered on the titular bear helping characters escape from trouble, because it is the only show he owns and is allowed to watch. One night, he sneaks out only to see several police cars approach the home. As the police raid the bunker, James is taken away from Ted and April, who are arrested.

James is brought to the police station and meets Detective Vogel, who tells James that Ted and April are not his real parents and that he has been held captive since he was a baby. Vogel then introduces James to his real parents, Greg and Louise Pope, and their teenage daughter, Aubrey. Having trouble adapting to his new life, James visits a psychologist named Emily who informs James that Brigsby Bear Adventures was made by Ted, a former artist and designer who disappeared with his wife in 1987, and that only James has ever seen it. Emily explains that the police tracked Ted from the studio where the show was made after he was spotted by a passerby days prior. Realizing that no one else will continue the story, James comes up with the idea of making a movie based on the character to close the series.

One night, Aubrey takes James to a party. He meets Aubrey's friend Spencer and later starts talking about Brigsby Bear to his new friends. He starts production after Vogel, who sympathizes with James through Vogel's own early acting dreams, lends James some props from the show, and Spencer, being a filmmaker, agrees to make the movie with him. Spencer also advertises the movie by uploading episodes of Brigsby Bear Adventures to YouTube, where it gains popularity and a new audience. Greg and Louise do not approve of James' activities because they fear it hinders his chances of living a normal life.

While filming in a forest, James uses an explosive he made for a scene that detonates, surprising Spencer. The group is arrested, but James takes the blame for it. The police release him but confiscate the Brigsby Bear props once again. James takes his parents' car out one night to steal the costumes and props. He first takes a detour to his old underground home, now abandoned and cordoned off with yellow tape. James stops by a diner and discovers Whitney, an actress he recognizes from Brigsby Bear. She tells him that she never knew the true circumstances behind the side acting job, having been told by Ted that it was for Canadian public access television. As the police arrive outside, James asks Whitney to reprise her role for his film and admits he has had a longtime crush on her.

James is placed in a mental institution. Meanwhile, Aubrey shows her parents parts of the movie, where the two realize that making the movie allowed him to spend time with his friends. One night, James breaks out of the institution to grab his belongings, but discovers his family, along with Spencer and Vogel, building a Brigsby Bear set in their garage. The family tells him that they had agreed to help out after seeing how happy he was behind the scenes.

James finishes the movie, with Vogel and Whitney in lead roles, and visits an incarcerated Ted, who apologizes for abducting him. James tells Ted about the movie and states that they are having trouble getting the voices right. Ted helps him out by recording the voice-overs for Brigsby and other characters.

On premiere night, the show is sold out and James is worried no one will like it, so he stays out of the theater while the movie plays. After it concludes, James walks into the theater and is met with a standing ovation. While being embraced by his family, James notices a real-life Brigsby onstage. The pair nod at each other and Brigsby disappears.

== Cast ==
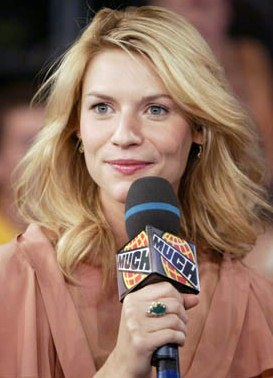
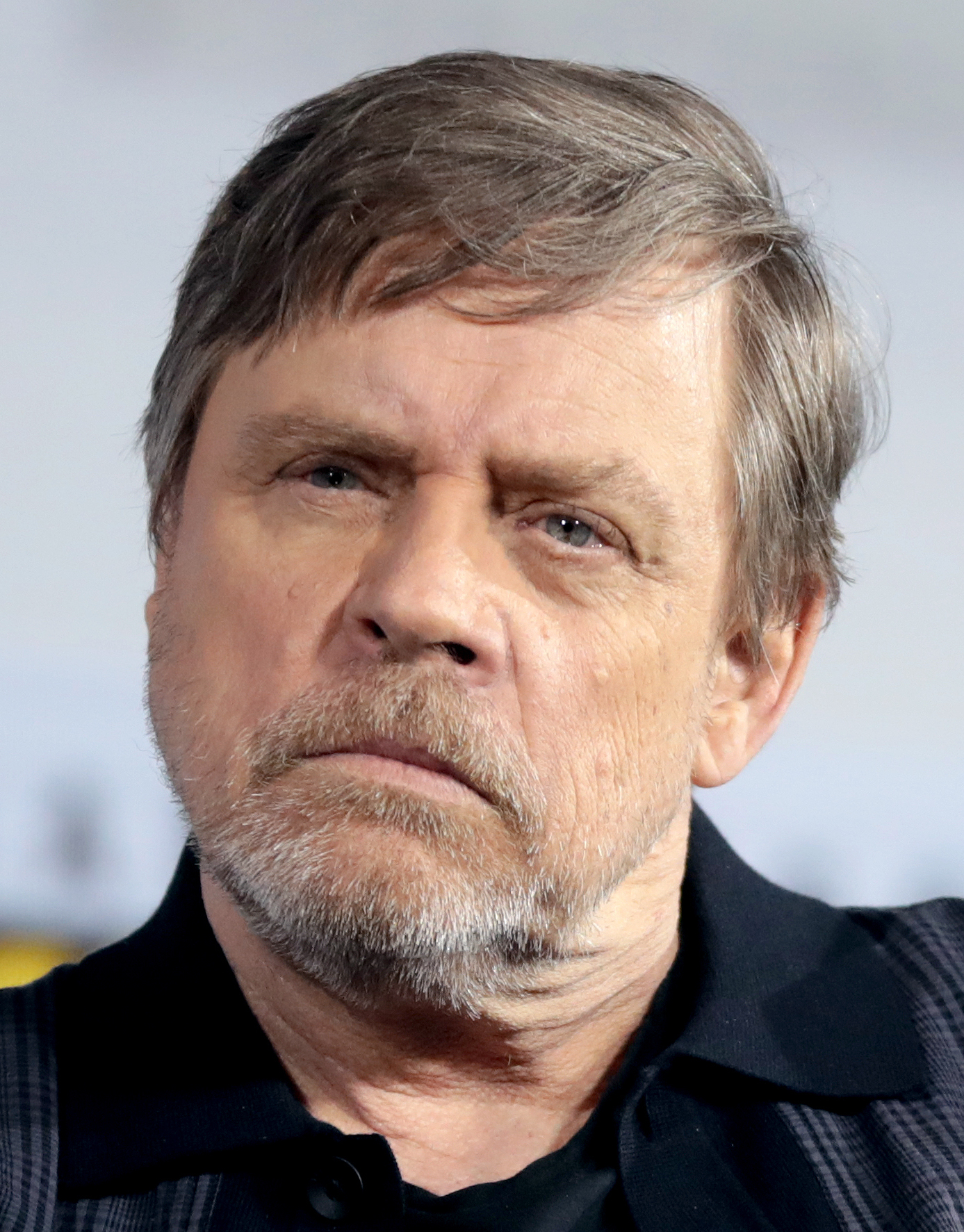
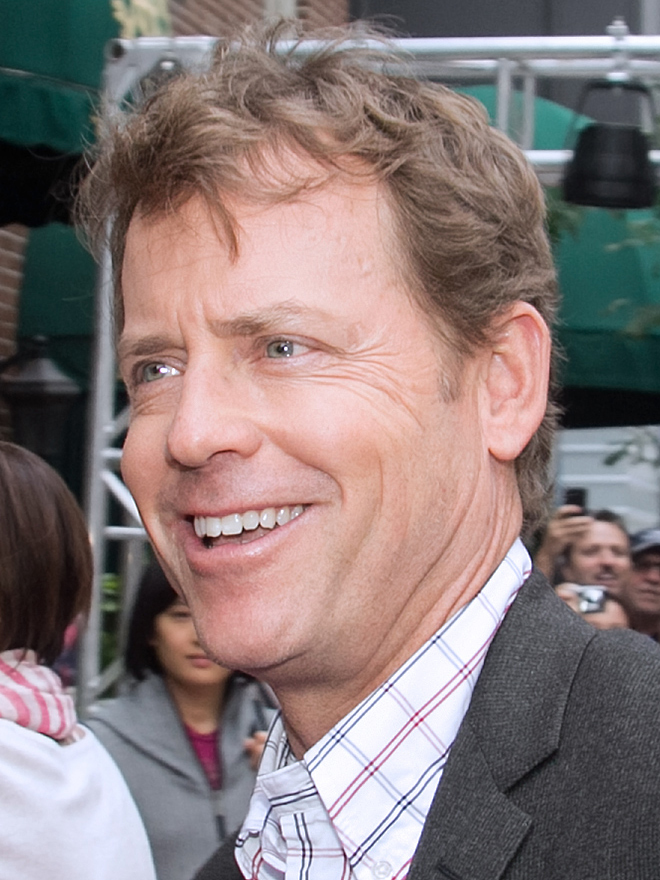
From left to right: Claire Danes, Mark Hamill, and Greg Kinnear portray Emily, Ted, and Detective Vogel, respectively.
- Kyle Mooney as James Pope, an adult who was raised in isolation watching Brigsby Bear Adventures and decides to write and direct a film to conclude the show's storyline
- Claire Danes as Emily, a psychologist supervising James' return to the outside world
- Mark Hamill as Ted Mitchum, an artist and designer of the popular 80s toy Terrence the Tiger who abducted and raised James and made Brigsby Bear Adventures for him. In Brigsby Bear Adventures, Ted voices Brigsby Bear and the evil planetoid Sunsnatcher.
- Greg Kinnear as Detective Vogel, a kind-hearted police officer and former amateur actor who later plays Feldo Mortese in The Brigsby Bear Movie I Made with My Friends
- Andy Samberg as Eric, a patient at a psychiatric hospital who befriends James and later has a role in The Brigsby Bear Movie I Made with My Friends
- Matt Walsh as Greg Pope, James' real father
- Michaela Watkins as Louise Pope, James' real mother
- Ryan Simpkins as Aubrey Pope, James' younger sister
- Jorge Lendeborg Jr. as Spencer, a young man who befriends James and helps him make the film
- Beck Bennett as Deputy Bander, a police officer
- Alexa Demie as Merideth, a friend of Aubrey
- Chance Crimin as Logan, a friend of Aubrey who plays the Storm Soldier in The Brigsby Bear Movie I Made with My Friends
- Kate Lyn Sheil as Whitney, an actress who played the Arielle and Nina Smiles on Brigsby Bear Adventures while unaware of the show's true nature
  - Kiera Milan Hendricks portrays the younger Smiles Sisters on earlier episodes of Brigsby Bear Adventures
- Jane Adams as April Mitchum, a former city college professor and Ted's wife with whom he raised James ever since she masterminded his abduction
- Tim Heidecker as Coach Brad, a character from a movie that James and Aubrey see
- Kelly Chapman as a news anchor who covers the arrests of Ted and April
- Nick Rutherford as an excited man

Ben Bayouth did the puppeteer work in this film.

== Production ==
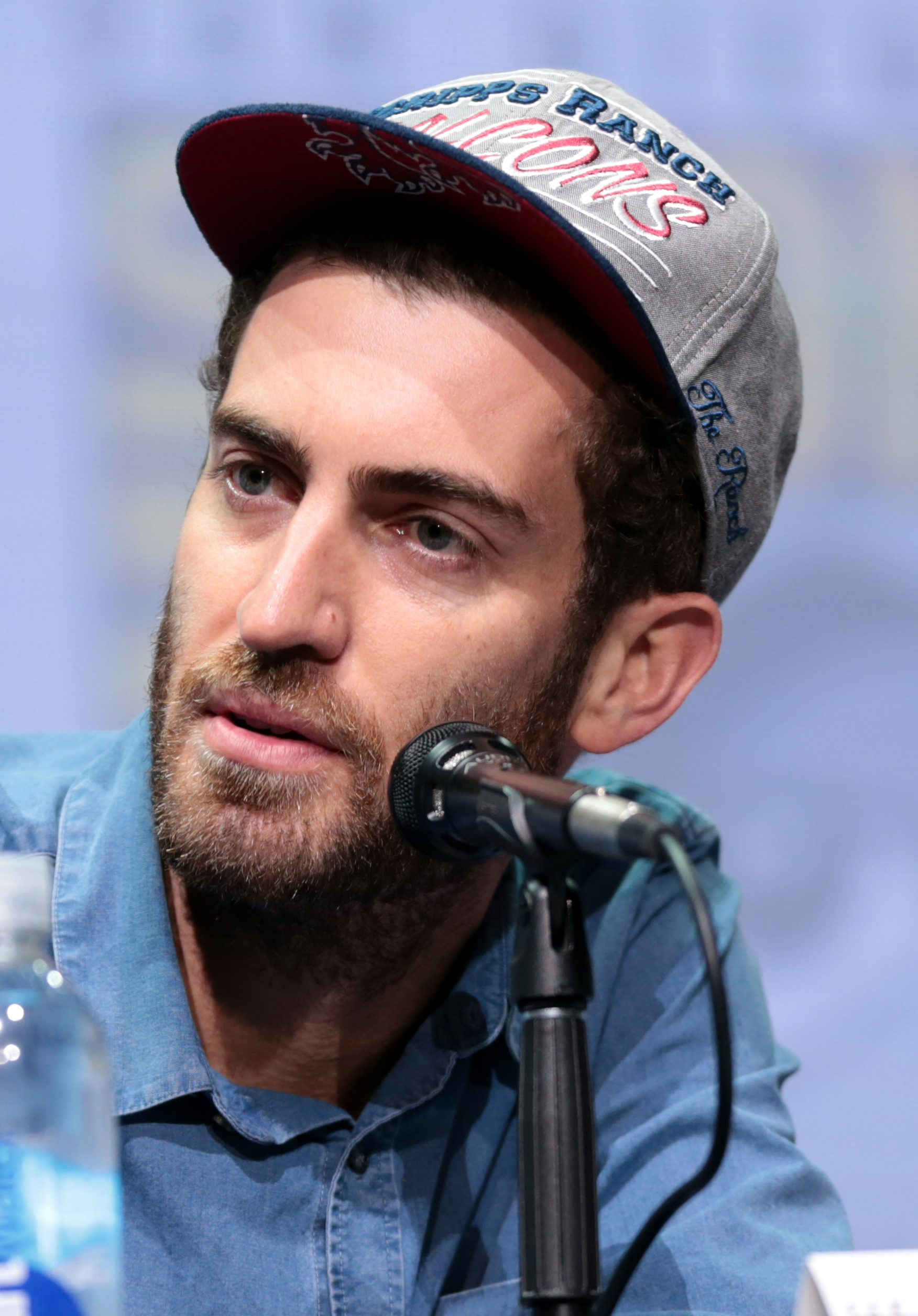
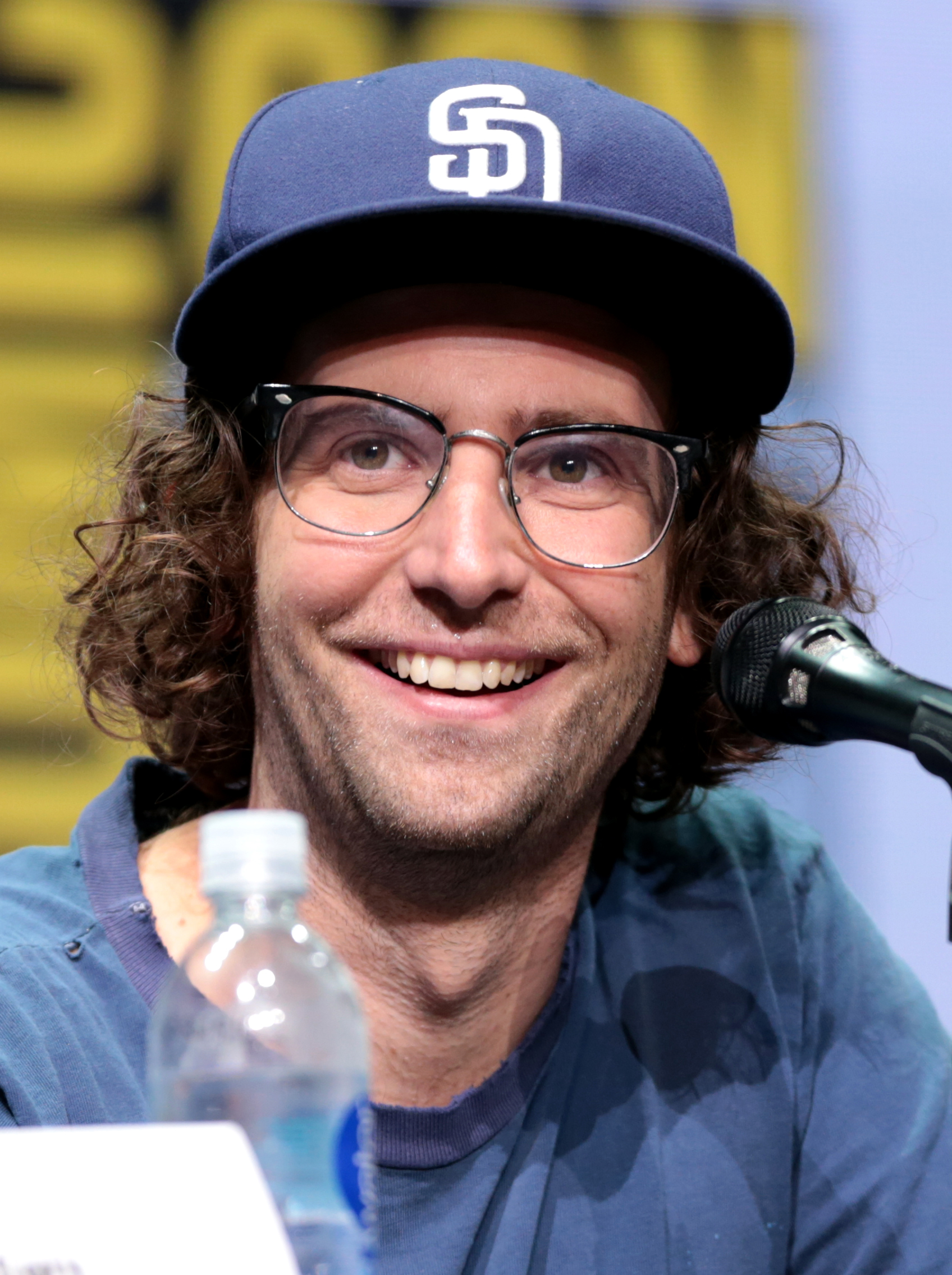
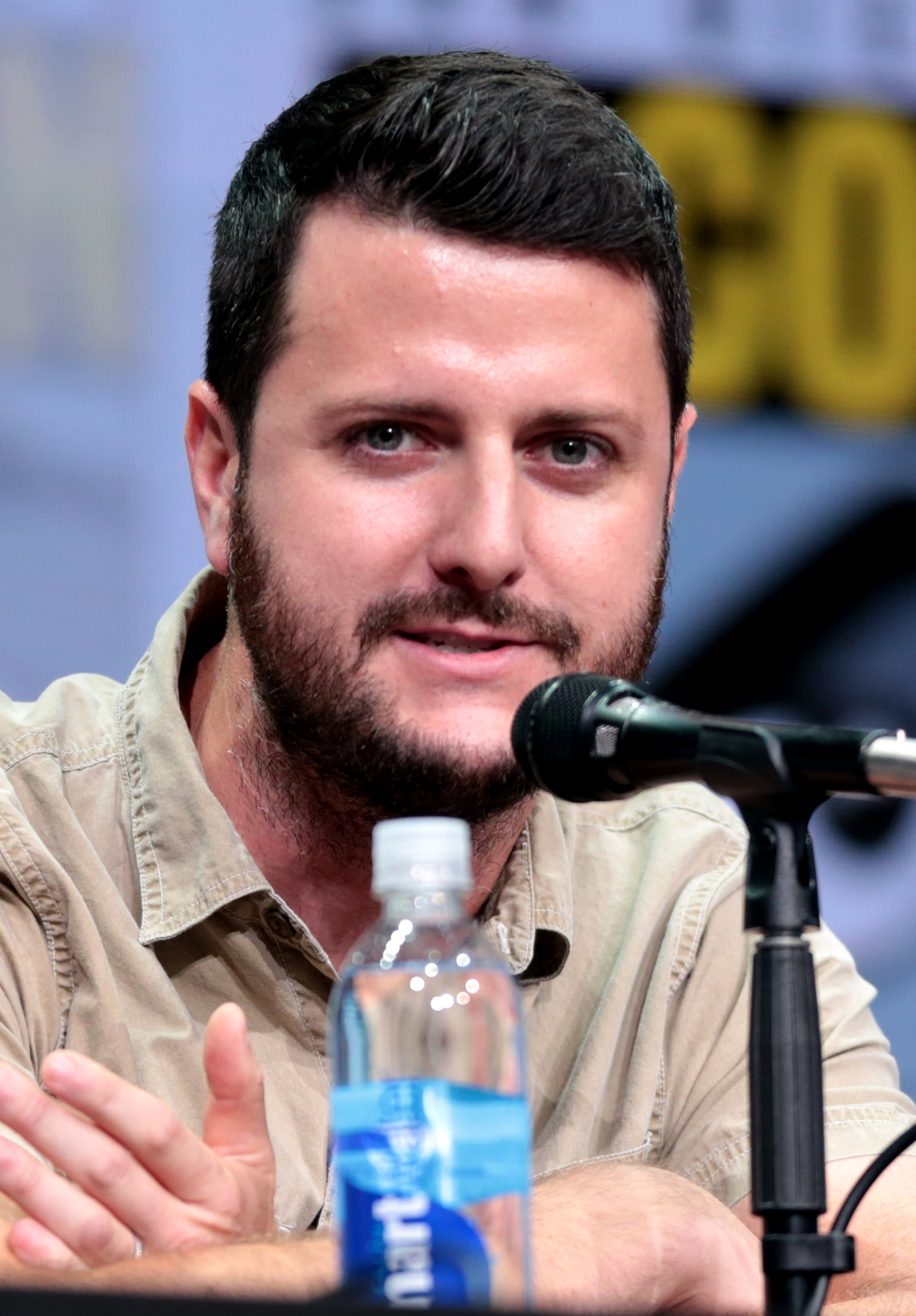
From left to right: director Dave McCary and writers Kyle Mooney and Kevin Costello

Brigsby Bear was co-written by Kyle Mooney and Kevin Costello, and directed by Dave McCary in his directorial debut. All three grew up in San Diego, California and attended middle school together. Mooney and McCary, alongside Beck Bennett and Nick Rutherford, later formed the sketch group Good Neighbor, and all joined the cast and crew of Saturday Night Live (SNL) in 2013. Mooney and Costello wrote the film over a two-to-three-year period. Much of the character of James comes from Mooney's personal life, which he considered obsessive, sometimes awkward, and always nostalgic. Whenever Costello and Mooney could write together, they would write fast and messy, with Costello polishing it while Mooney worked at SNL. Mooney was fascinated by children's television shows from the 1980s, which he felt combined "happy-go-lucky and positive meets the creepy, weird, and psychedelic." He and McCary both singled out Prayer Bear as a primary inspiration. Mooney collects VHS tapes from garage sales, which also fueled the film's aesthetic.

Their positions at SNL allowed them to cast their film with big names such as Mark Hamill, who plays Ted, the main villain. McCary likened Ted's character to a depraved Jim Henson, "teaching weird lessons about the world in a loving way." He noted he and Costello both grew up in strict Christian households, which colored the way they depicted the character. They hoped to have viewers intrigued by the retro nature of the bunker, which they infused with a "low-rent Splash Mountain" feel. McCary was largely responsible for the film's earnest and sometimes melancholy tone, which he felt serviced James's emotional journey in the film. For McCary, he had always hoped to direct something dramatic, as opposed to his more comedic material in the past. Part of James's journey in the film, including his fear that people would not enjoy his film, came from a genuine place for the filmmakers. In addition, when making the film, they discovered that in many ways, they were documenting their friendship of creating videos together.

The film was shot in mid-2016 in Utah during Mooney and McCary's break from SNL due to the geography. The Utah Film Commission put out a press release in June 2016 announcing that six films had been granted incentives to film in the state, including Brigsby Bear. They shot the film with a small, close-knit group and likened the experience to summer camp. After shooting the film, McCary had to complete editing while still working at SNL.

== Release ==
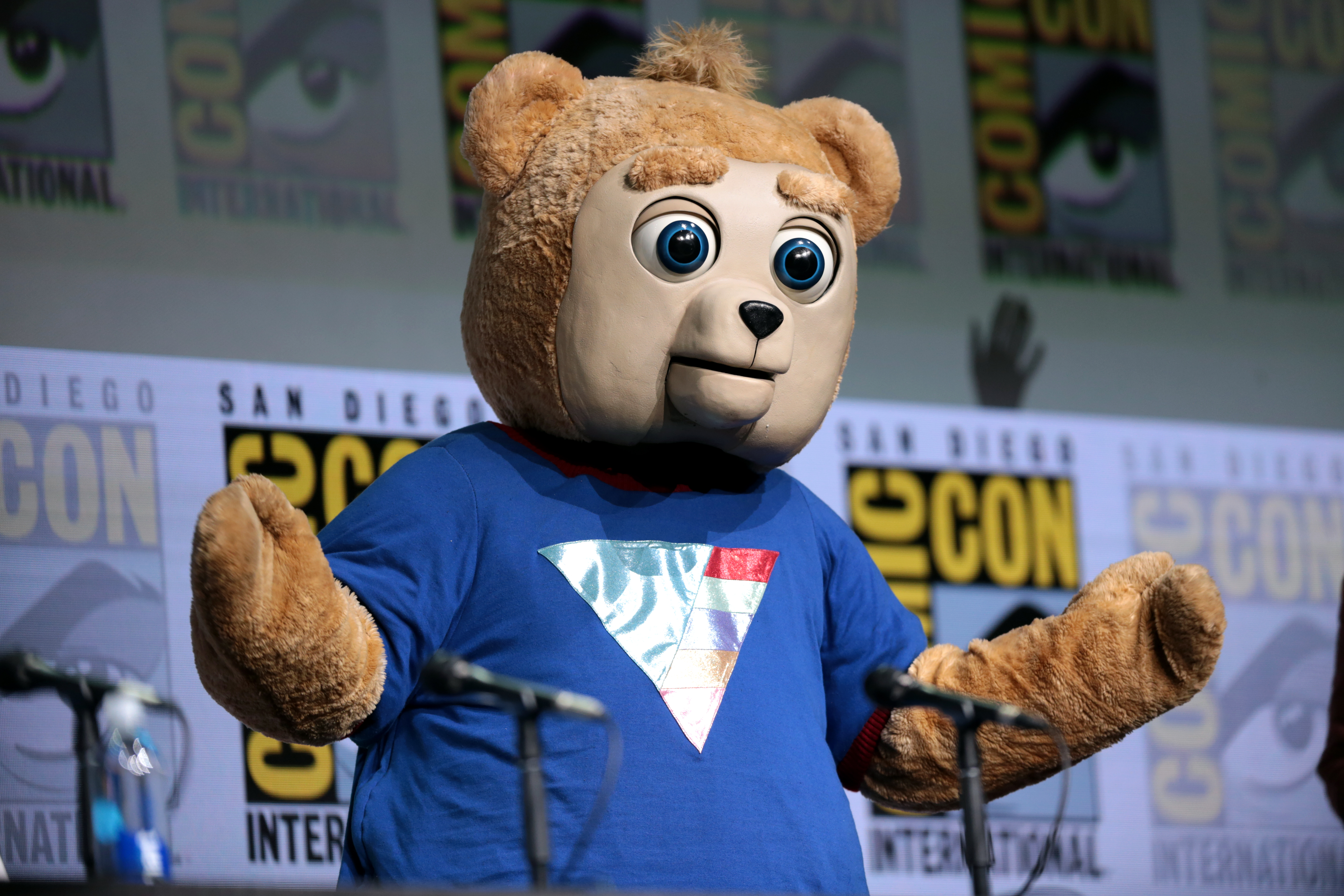
The titular Brigsby Bear at the 2017 San Diego Comic-Con

The film premiered at the Eccles Theater at the Sundance Film Festival on January 23, 2017. Shortly after, Sony Pictures Classics (SPC) acquired distribution rights to the film for $5 million, which was far higher than the film's budget, beating out studios including The Orchard and Netflix, with Entertainment One and Universal Pictures looking to acquire foreign rights. The team behind the film were happy working with SPC, noting that they wanted no edits made to the film and were on the same page regarding keeping the film's plot line a secret in its marketing. They achieved this by only advertising the film's first 15 minutes. Mooney said they "always wanted it to be somewhat mysterious", while McCary said he was not "excited about the prospect of people going to this movie being a step ahead".

After having a panel at the 2017 San Diego Comic-Con, the film's formal premiere was in New York on July 26, 2017, beginning its theatrical run on July 28. The film was released on DVD, Blu-ray, and digital download on November 14, 2017.

== Reception ==
On the review aggregator website Rotten Tomatoes, 83% of 165 critics' reviews are positive, with an average rating of 6.8/10. The site's critical consensus reads, "Audiences attuned to Brigsby Bear's strange frequency will be moved by its earnest – and endearingly original – approach to pop culture's impact and the creative urge." Metacritic, which uses a weighted average, assigned the film a score of 67 out of 100, based on 35 critics, indicating "generally favorable" reviews.

Manohla Dargis from The New York Times summarized it as a "sweet and sometimes delightful melancholic story," which she praised for its direction in tackling subjects about imagination and love. John DeFore of The Hollywood Reporter found it to be "a charming, surprisingly underplayed paean to pop-culture obsession." Geoff Berkshire of Variety praised every aspect of the film from its cast to script, but singled out the art department's successful presentation of the Brigsby show and the underground bunker from the opening scenes. Vulture's Emily Yoshida analyzed it as asking questions about the impact of fandoms along with "the purging effect of storytelling." A.A. Dowd of The A.V. Club felt it could have been a "soulful fairy tale," but ended up "a quirky sitcom recovery fable about transforming our childhoods through art to overcome them." Leslie Felperin, writing for The Guardian, deemed it "overly whimsical," but also "likable enough, even if it contains precious few belly laughs."

Stephanie Merry from The Washington Post perceived the film's genuine tone as fresh and that it "never ventures into the caustic simply for the sake of comedy." Conversely, David Sims of The Atlantic felt the film ends up too "blandly optimistic" but felt it was "hard to fault Mooney and Costello for choosing the sweeter path". The Boston Globe's Tom Russo surmised "the [sincere] approach can be a reach, but on the whole it works better than you might guess." Entertainment Weekly's Chris Nashawaty considered it a "slight, handcrafted indie that's sweet, skewed, and feels a bit like a skit stretched out to feature length." David Ehrlich of IndieWire felt the film veered into formula, concluding that it "settles for a weak trajectory that isn't good enough to be weird."
