= Kyle Mooney =

American comedian and actor (born 1984)

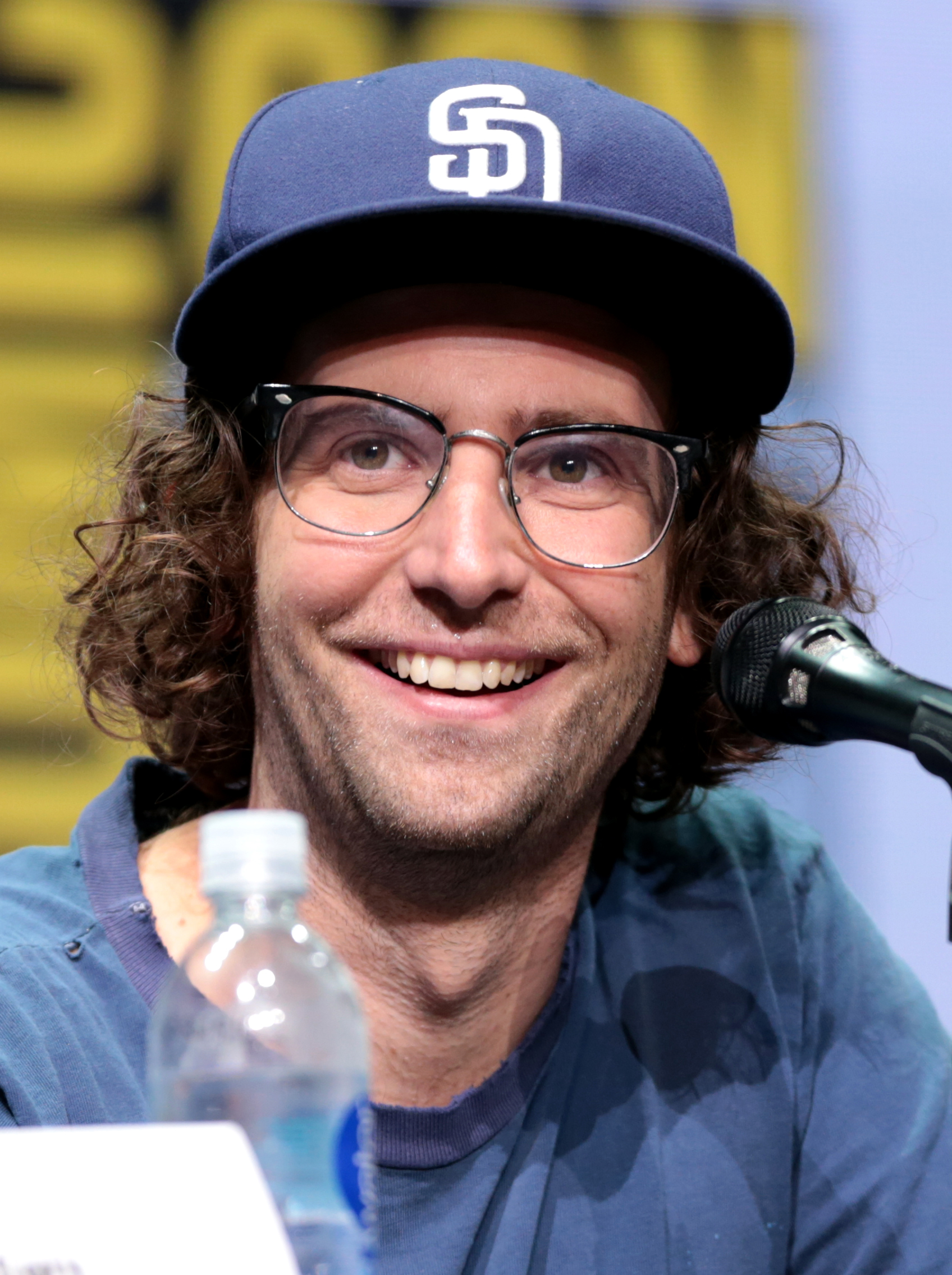
- Mooney in 2017
- Born: Kyle James Kozub Mooney; September 4, 1984 (age 42); San Diego, California, U.S.
- Other name: Kyle M.
- Education: University of Southern California (BFA)
- Occupations: Comedian, actor, writer
- Years active: 2005–present
- Spouse: Kate Lyn Sheil (m. 2021)
- Children: 1

Kyle James Kozub Mooney (born September 4, 1984) is an American comedian and actor. He was a cast member on the NBC sketch comedy series Saturday Night Live, which he was featured in from 2013 to 2022. In 2017, he co-wrote and starred in the comedy drama Brigsby Bear, which premiered at that year's Sundance Film Festival and went on to receive critical acclaim upon its theatrical release. In 2021, he co-created and starred in the Netflix animated series Saturday Morning All Star Hits! and directed his second feature, the horror-comedy Y2K in 2024.

== Early life and education ==
Mooney was born the youngest in a family of three boys in San Diego, California, to parents Linda (née Kozub) and Brian Mooney. Linda was a former reporter for The San Diego Union-Tribune, and Brian is an environmental consultant and planner. He has two older brothers, Sean and Ryan.

Mooney's Marshall Middle School class chose him as the most likely to become a television star. He graduated from Scripps Ranch High School in 2003, where he won Best Actor as Prospero in Shakespeare's The Tempest and was hailed as class clown. Mooney studied film at the University of Southern California. There, he performed improv and sketch comedy with collegiate group Commedus Interruptus. After a six-week audition process in 2003, the three new members added to the group were Mooney, Beck Bennett, and Nick Rutherford. He graduated from the USC School of Cinematic Arts in 2007.

== Career ==
=== Good Neighbor ===
In 2007, Mooney, Bennett, Rutherford and Dave McCary formed the sketch comedy group Good Neighbor, uploading video content on the YouTube channel GoodNeighborStuff. Bennett and McCary joined Saturday Night Live alongside Mooney in 2013 (as a performer and director, respectively), and Rutherford was hired as a writer the following year. In 2014, Good Neighbor was featured on NewMediaRockstars' Top 100 Channels, ranked at No. 98.

=== Saturday Night Live ===
Mooney auditioned to join Saturday Night Live in the summer of 2012 but was rejected; he successfully auditioned the following year, joining the cast during the show's 39th season. On September 28, 2013, he debuted as a featured player. At the start of the season 41, Mooney was upgraded to repertory status.

Mooney brought some of his YouTube characters to the show, including his person-on-the-street interviews, the 4/20 Weed-Smoking Guy, Chris Fitzpatrick, Todd from Inside SoCal, and Bruce Chandling.

His celebrity impressions on Saturday Night Live include Jim Acosta, Woody Allen, Criss Angel, Fred Astaire, David Axelrod, Jeff Bezos, Neil Cavuto, Lincoln Chafee, Bradley Cooper, Tom Cotton, Johnny Depp, Michael Jackson, Bruce Jessen, Steve Jobs, John Kennedy, Chris Kirkpatrick, Joey Lawrence, Macklemore, Howie Mandel, Chuck Norris, Rand Paul, Pope Francis, Axl Rose, Skrillex, Stephen Stills, and Steven Tyler. He left the show in 2022 at the conclusion of season 47, ending a nine-season run. He has made subsequent cameo appearances in the pre-taped sketch "Papyrus 2", during Charli XCX's hosting debut, and the Saturday Night Live 50th Anniversary Special.

=== Other work ===
Mooney has appeared on a number of shows, including Jimmy Kimmel Live! and Sports Show with Norm Macdonald. He has also served as a writer and performer with the Upright Citizens Brigade.

Mooney starred in and co-wrote the film Brigsby Bear, which premiered in 2017 at the Sundance Film Festival. He co-wrote the film with Kevin Costello, drawing inspiration from his own life, his interest in 1980s children's television shows and cartoons, and his experience making short films with Costello and McCary in middle school. McCary directed the film.

Mooney co-created, wrote, and produced the adult animated comedy Saturday Morning All Star Hits!, released on Netflix on December 10, 2021. He appears in several roles including twins Skip and Treybor, Bruce Chandling, and animated characters Randy and Brusho. The eight-episode series is co-directed by McCary and series co-creator Ben Jones. Mooney and Jones created the show based on a mutual appreciation of retro Saturday-morning cartoon blocks.

Mooney directed the disaster comedy Y2K for A24. The movie debuted at the South by Southwest Festival on March 9, 2024, and was released on December 6, 2024.

Under the name Kyle M., Mooney released his debut album, The Real Me, on March 21, 2025, on the independent record label Stones Throw. In August 2025, Mooney and Bennett launched the podcast What's Our Podcast?

== Personal life ==
In 2021, Mooney married actress Kate Lyn Sheil. In December 2023, Mooney revealed that he and his wife had welcomed a daughter.

Mooney is a self-described collector and owns a VHS collection that he started as a child. Through connections made while working on SNL, he has been able to get several VHS tapes autographed by the actors who have starred in them, including a Beetlejuice VHS signed by both Michael Keaton and Alec Baldwin.

== Filmography ==
=== Film ===
Year	Title	Role	Notes
2012	Kill Me Now	Jake	
2012	The Party Is Over	Natan	
2013	iSteve	Father	
2014	Playing It Cool	Other Dude	
2015	Hello, My Name Is Doris	Robert	
2015	Me Him Her	Moot Morezit	
2015	It Had to Be You	Gary the Midwife	
2016	Zoolander 2	Don Atari	
2016	Neighbors 2: Sorority Rising	R.A.	
2017	Brigsby Bear	James Pope	Also co-writer
2018	Never Goin' Back	Brandon	
2018	The Unicorn	Gabe	
2019	Batman vs. Teenage Mutant Ninja Turtles	Michelangelo (voice)	Direct-to-video
2020	Spree	Miles Manderville	
2021	Naked Singularity	The Golem	
2023	Jamojaya	Producer	
2023	No Hard Feelings	Jody	
2024	Unfrosted	Snap	
2024	Y2K	Garrett	Also writer and director
2025	Gabby's Dollhouse: The Movie	Kitty Gnome (voice)	
2026	Street Fighter	Marvin	
2026	The Man with the Bag		Post-production
2027	A Place in Hell		Post-production

=== Television ===
Year	Title	Role	Notes
2010	Remember When	Kyle	Episode: #1.1
2010–2011	Pretend Time	Various	5 episodes
2011	The Street Fighter	Rick	
2011	Jimmy Kimmel Live!	Himself/Correspondent	Episode: #9.172
2011	Sports Show with Norm Macdonald	Nephew Kyle	3 episodes
2011	Parks and Recreation	Keith	Episode: "The Treaty"
2012	Best Friends Forever	Doug	Episode: "The Butt Dial"
2012	Money From Strangers	Himself	Episode: "Why So Serious?"
2013	Festival Road Trip	Himself/Good Neighbor Member	Episode: "Campus MovieFest 2013"
2013	Nathan for You	—N/a	Writer; 8 episodes
2013	Wilfred	Alan	Episode: "Heroism"
2013	Hello Ladies	Rory	6 episodes
2013–2022	Saturday Night Live	Himself, various	186 episodes
2014	Comedy Bang! Bang!	Intern Monty	Episode: "Nick Offerman Wears a Green Flannel Shirt & Brown Boots"
2014	Hello Ladies: The Movie	Rory	TV movie
2014–2018	Drunk History	Himself / Sam Patch	3 episodes
2015	Hot Package	—N/a	Consulting writer; season 2
2017	Me, Myself & I	Attendant	Episode: "The Card"
2018–2019	Arrested Development	Murphy Brown Fünke	13 episodes
2020	The Shivering Truth	(voice)	Episode: "The Diff"
2020–2022	Bob's Burgers	Nick / Kyle (voice)	2 episodes
2021	Rick and Morty	Blazen (voice)	Episode: "Rickdependence Spray"
2021	Saturday Morning All Star Hits!	Various	Co-creator, writer, and executive producer; 8 episodes
2023	The Great North	Cody (voice)	Episode: "Can't Hardly Date Adventure"
2023	Digman!	Sludgely (voice)	Episode: "The Puff People"
2023	Killing It	Bugs	Episode: "It Follows"
2023	Miracle Workers	John Christ	3 episodes
2023	Hamster & Gretel	The Flake (voice)	Episode: "Flake It Till You Make It"
2024	A Nonsense Christmas with Sabrina Carpenter	Dave	Television special
2025	Saturday Night Live 50th Anniversary Special	Groomsman, himself	Television special, NBC
2025	Platonic	Terry	2 episodes
2026	Life, Larry and the Pursuit of Unhappiness	Paul Revere	Episode 6 ("Buzz")
2026	Big City Greens	Mikey (voice)	Episode: "Daddy Ditty"
2026	Ted: The Animated Series	Apollo (voice)	

=== Web series and shorts ===
Date	Title	Role	Notes
2008	The Roommate	Kyle	
2009	Nick's Big Show	—N/a	
2009	Bad Reputation	Randall	
2010	Vicariously	Tyler	Nine Shots of Bourbon
2010	The O.D.	Plain Jane	
2011	How I Know	Toro Y Moi	
2011	Nick and Andy: Coming Soon	—N/a	
2011	The Yule Tide Good Samaritan	Barry Cameo	
2011	Grammar Class	Henry	
2011–2012	College Humor Originals	Student/Guy 1	Some Study That I Used to Know; Sorority Pillow Fight
2012	Take a Knee	Walter Telly	Mock Christian & basketball public access show
2012	Cracked Advice Board	Little Boy	Money-Making Tips
2012	The Dinner Party	Steven Evans	Short web film with BriTANicK
2012	Epic Rap Battles of History	Dr. Watson	Batman vs. Sherlock Holmes
2013	Youth Large	Danus Apicary	Rejected Adult Swim pilot
2013	The Caper Kind/Swiss Mistake	Lookey Lou	
2013	Mike & Doug's Fantasy Corner	Mike	Fantasy Sports Advice
2013	Pound House	Kyle	Open Mic
2013	D and K Podcast	Kyle	Instagram video series

== Discography ==
Studio albums

- The Real Me (2025)

EPs

- Winter's Wish (2025)

== Bibliography ==
- Mooney, Kyle (June 1, 2020). "Some of your Third-Grade friend Alex Quiply's best lies". Shouts & Murmurs. The New Yorker. Vol. 96, no. 15. p. 21.
