= Animation Domination High-Def =

Defunct American late-night programming block on Fox

- Network: Fox (2013–2015); FXX (2015–2016)
- Launched: July 21, 2013; 13 years ago
- Closed: March 5, 2016; 10 years ago
- Country of origin: United States
- Format: Adult animation Satire; Adult comedy
- Running time: 1 hour 30 min
- Official website: www.foxadhd.com

Animation Domination High-Def (also called Animation Domination HD, Fox ADHD, and ADHD) was a late-night programming block broadcast by Fox. Originally premiering on July 21, 2013 as a spin-off of Animation Domination, the block originally focused on new, original adult animation series—similarly in style to Adult Swim. The ninety-minute block and its content were primarily produced by Friends Night, a television animation studio headed by Adult Swim alumni Nick Weidenfeld, Hend Baghdady, and creative director Ben Jones (who also created The Problem Solverz for Cartoon Network)—including its programs, along with interstitials (ADHD Shorts) and other content featured during its programming.

In April 2014, it was reported that Fox planned to discontinue the ADHD block on television that June, citing an inability to reach the correct demographics among viewers; however, ADHD's digital outlets, which feature additional content such as online shorts, continued to operate until March 5, 2016. The block's last airings on Fox consisted only of reruns.

== History ==
=== 2013 ===
On January 8, 2013, Fox announced that it would launch a spin-off adult animation block – similar in format to Adult Swim – called Animation Domination High-Def. The block (alternately known as ADHD) ran Saturday late nights, originally airing for 90 minutes from 11:00 p.m. to 12:30 a.m. local time in most markets – later reduced to 11:00 p.m. to 12:00 a.m. on September 7, 2013 with the 12:00 a.m. half-hour being given back to its owned-and-operated stations and affiliates to carry other programming – with some affiliates delaying the block by 30 minutes to an hour to run late evening newscasts. Overruns of Fox Sports broadcasts caused further delays on many evenings.

Animation Domination High-Def was created to fill the first-run programming hole in Fox's Saturday late night schedule left by the 2010 cancellations of The Wanda Sykes Show (a short-lived satirical talk show that replaced MADtv the year prior) and Talkshow with Spike Feresten, with the 90-minute block being filled thereafter by reruns of the network's primetime series. Fox Entertainment Group's president at the time, Kevin Reilly, announced the block would feature alternative programming, highlighting short films and extended film trailers in between the episodes. Nick Weidenfeld, former development head at Adult Swim, was tapped to oversee the block. The block uses various animated bumpers that were produced each week (in comparison to Adult Swim) with a new "Week In Review" piece that aired each Saturday.

Weidenfeld stated in an interview with The New York Times that Animation Domination High-Def would celebrate "the paramount importance of youth and love and friendship and hanging out and being awesome – not ironically awesome, just awesome." His intent was for the block to offer viewers new content with a significant lack of cynicism, which he believed contrasts his former employer (Williams Street, programmer of Adult Swim), which he stated is "not an optimistic channel." Despite this, Weidenfeld allowed Cartoon Network/Adult Swim owner Turner Broadcasting System to purchase commercial time during the premiere night of ADHD (one ad aired at 11:30 p.m. with a Talking Heads reference stating that Adult Swim was first in the format, and the last ad aired at midnight congratulating the crew before the start of a rerun of The Cleveland Show). Weidenfeld responded: "We love Adult Swim and we’re happy to receive both their attention and their ad dollars!" Fox executives were not made aware of the local ad buys, which was done without their knowledge.

All content within the block – the animation for the programs themselves, bumpers and interstitial short films (some of which feature parodies of different characters) – were produced by Friends Night Studios at its offices on Sunset Boulevard in Los Angeles. Along with the short seasons offered for production approval (six to twelve episodes a year) and Fox's ownership of all content in the process, this setup was designed to reduce total costs and significantly shorten the turnaround time for most shows. In addition to the Fox lineup, ADHD's programming is also available for streaming on a dedicated website (FOXADHD.com) and mobile app as well as through Hulu. All of the programs in the lineup were generally shown without commercial interruption, and with few exceptions, aired without editing. The High School USA! episode "Best Friends Forever" was released briefly on Hulu and not broadcast on Fox due to content issues with the network's standards and practices department.

=== 2014 ===
On April 17, 2014, Broadcasting & Cable reported that Fox would discontinue Animation Domination High-Def after the June 28, 2014 broadcast of the block, citing an inability to reach the correct demographics during its Saturday late night timeslot—particularly as a result of overrunning college football games. Through the digital platform, Fox planned to reposition ADHD as an "incubator" for new series that could premiere on its Sunday primetime lineup—with plans for Friends Night to produce two half-hour series to debut in June 2015.

The block itself continued to air on some Fox stations until March 5, 2016, albeit consisting solely of reruns of programs from ADHD and Fox's Sunday lineup. A series created by Ben Jones, entitled Stone Quackers, premiered on FXX on October 27 as part of a special preview.

=== 2015: Shift to FXX ===
In 2015, Fox began to shift the original series it had produced through ADHD to its cable networks. On December 17, 2014, it was announced that they would encompass a new late-night block on FXX beginning on January 22, 2015, also branded as Animation Domination, with new episodes of Axe Cop, Lucas Bros. Moving Co and Stone Quackers joined by reruns of other ADHD series and shorts. To promote the new block, previews of the two series were aired at midnight ET on January 1, 2015 as a lead-out for a marathon of The Simpsons, while new episodes of the two series aired following the premiere of the sixth season of Archer on FX on January 8, 2015.

FX Networks' Chuck Saftler viewed the additions as a complement to their existing animated series, explaining that "based on the successful launch of The Simpsons on FXX, this is the perfect time to expand our animation offerings and make FXX the after hours destination for animated shorts and series." Reruns of these new episodes can still potentially air on Fox. The FXX adaptation of this block includes an "Everything That Happened This Week" recap that appears in between the first two shows. That recap was discontinued in 2016.

== Programming ==
Title	Year	Created by	Co-production(s)	Notes
ADHD Shorts	2013–2016	ADHD		A series of animated shorts used as interstitial programming between episodes. Most of them are in sketches form with a few animated songs. Writing is primarily done by Heather Anne Campbell with most songs performed by Liz Beebe, apart from the short introductory title card using an excerpt of the song St Jacques by Lightning Bolt.
Axe Cop	2013–2015	Malachai Nicolle; Ethan Nicolle		Based on the comics of the same name by brothers Malachai Nicolle and Ethan Nicolle (primarily from Malachai's imagination), this show follows the adventures of an axe-wielding police officer named Axe Cop (voiced by Nick Offerman), his partner Flute Cop (voiced by Ken Marino), and their team of superheroes as they face off against various supervillains.
High School USA!	2013, 2015 (Episode 6)	Dino Stamatopoulos	Fragical Productions	High School USA is a parody cartoon of the Archie comic book characters and modern issues not generally explored in those comics. The show is about the millennial high-school experience, following a clique of sunny, well-meaning students consisting of Marsh Merriwether (voiced by Vincent Kartheiser), Amber Lamber (voiced by Zosia Mamet), Cassandra Barren (voiced by Mandy Moore), Brad Slovee (voiced by T.J. Miller), and Lamort Blackstein (voiced by Nathan Barnatt).
Lucas Bros. Moving Co.	2013–2015	The Lucas Bros.	Oh Snap	Created by brothers Kenny and Keith Lucas, who play easy-going (and often unpaid) movers in Brooklyn going through various misadventures.
Golan the Insatiable	2013–2015	Josh Miller	Double Hemm; Amazing Schlock (Season 1 only)	A demigod warlord named Golan (voiced by Josh Miller) from the dimension of Gkruool befriends a goth tween named Dylan Beekler (voiced by Mary Mack) and ends up stuck in the suburbs living with her yuppie family after being banished from Gkruool by its rebels. The series was picked up by Fox for its own half-hour prime-time series featuring a new voice cast and alternate continuity which premiered on May 31, 2015 on Fox's Sunday Funday lineup.
Stone Quackers	2014–2015	Ben Jones	Ben Jones Studio, Inc.	Created by Ben Jones, who also created The Problem Solverz. Set on the fictional island city of Cheeseburger Island, the series revolves around the misadventures of two ducks named Whit and Clay (voiced by Whitmer Thomas and Clay Tatum respectively) along with their friends Barf (voiced by Ben Jones) and Dottie (voiced by Heather Lawless), plus the incompetent police officer named Officer Barry (voiced by John C. Reilly) and neighborhood kid Bug (voiced by Bud Diaz).
Major Lazer	2015	Diplo; Ferry Gouw; Kevin Kusatsu	Mad Decent	Set in the future, Major Lazer (voiced by Adewale Akinnuoye-Agbaje) is a Jamaican superhero with a laser gun for a right hand who fights against the dystopian forces led by Jamaica's leader President Whitewall (voiced by J.K. Simmons) and his servant General Rubbish (voiced by James Adomian). Major Lazer is assisted in his fight by President Whitewall's daughter Penny Whitewall (voiced by Angela Trimbur) and hacker Blkmrkt (voiced by John Boyega).

== Series ==
Fox ADHD has a range of collections of series that have a compilation of shorts. Some come from these, while others don't and run originally. Each of which continues on relating to the media, such as Scientifically Accurate, Songs You Didn't Know Had Lyrics, The Adventures Of OG Sherlock Kush, and Pug Lord.
