= Ben Jones (American cartoonist) =

American cartoonist (born 1977)

Ben Q. Jones
- Born: Benjamin Queair Jones; 1977 (age 48–49); Pittsburgh, Pennsylvania, U.S.
- Education: Massachusetts College of Art and Design
- Occupations: Artist, animator, filmmaker, voice actor
- Years active: 1999–present
- Notable work: The Problem Solverz; Stone Quackers; Saturday Morning All Star Hits!

Benjamin Queair Jones (born 1977) is an American artist, animator, filmmaker, and voice actor. He was a co-founder and member of the art collective Paper Rad from 2001 to 2008, as well as his own studio Ben Jones Studio, Inc. in 2008. He has worked on various animated television programs and web series for Animation Domination High-Def (ADHD). Since 2017, Jones is the creative director of Bento Box Entertainment. He lives and works in Los Angeles, California.

== Biography ==
Jones was born in 1977 in Pittsburgh, Pennsylvania and grew up in central Massachusetts. His family collected computers, a hobby initiated by his father, Frank, who was a software engineer. This influenced Jones a lot, so much that later he would draw inspiration for his future style of art and design.

Jones attended Massachusetts College of Art and Design, and graduated in 1999 with a B.F.A. in Studio of Interrelated Media (SIM).

== Career ==
While studying in Boston at Massachusetts College of Art and design, he began working in an art collaboration with classmate Christopher Forgues (C.F.) under the name "Paper Radio". Art in America magazine named Jones one of the, "most important cartoonists of their generation" for his work with Paper Radio. In 2000, he founded the East Coast art collective Paper Rad, with the artists Jacob and Jessica Ciocci. Paper Rad is best known for creating comics, zines, video art, net art, MIDI files, paintings, installations, and music with a distinct "lo-fi" aesthetic.

Ben Jones collaborated with PFFR and Williams Street on a 2008 pilot for Adult Swim titled Neon Knome. It was passed by the network and went on to become rebranded as a Cartoon Network show called The Problem Solverz. Jones is the main creator and the voice actor of Alfe and Roba in the Cartoon Network show, The Problem Solverz.

In 2013, Jones became the creative director of the Fox Saturday night programming block ADHD, where he released his series, Stone Quackers. The program aired as sneak peek on October 27, 2014, on FXX and a spin-off, Gothball, was premiered as a web-series on May 1, 2015, on the ADHD YouTube channel.

Since 2017, he began working at Bento Box Entertainment, and co-created Saturday Morning All Star Hits! with Kyle Mooney for Netflix and Universal Television.

Jones' work in fine art painting includes psychedelic themed painting, described as brightly colored, often visually flat or with pattern.

== Filmography ==
Project	Show run	Channel(s)	Credited role	No. of episodes	Notes
Pick a Winner	2004	DVD only	Director (credited as Paper Rad)	5 episodes	
I Dream of Zinedine Zidane	2005	Short only	Digital effect artist	Inexistent	
Super Mario Movie	2005	Short only	Director (credited as Paper Rad)	Inexistent	
Wonder Showzen	2005–2006	MTV2	Animator	Unavailable	
Trash Talking	2006	DVD only	Co-creator, Writer, Producer, Executive producer, Director, and Voice actor (credited as Paper Rad)	Unavailable	
Yo Gabba Gabba!	2007	Nick Jr. Nickelodeon	Jingle animator	1 episode	
Neon Knome	2008	Adult Swim	Creator, Animator, Writer, Executive producer, Director, Music composer, and Voice actor	1 episode	
The Problem Solverz	2011–2013	Cartoon Network	Creator, Executive producer, Director, Music composer, and Voice actor	26 episodes	
The Problem Solverz	2011–2013	Cartoon Network	Storyboard artist	2 episodes	
ADHD Shorts	2012–2016	Fox, FXX	Storyboard director	10 shorts	
ADHD Shorts	2012–2016	Fox, FXX	Voice actor	4 shorts	
ADHD Shorts	2012–2016	Fox, FXX	Designer	3 shorts	
ADHD Shorts	2012–2016	Fox, FXX	Writer	2 shorts	
Peanut Butter & Jelly	2013	Short only	Voice actor	Inexistent	
Wander Over Yonder	2013	Disney XD	Voice actor	1 episode	
High School USA!	2013	Fox	Creative director	12 episodes	
Axe Cop	2013–2015	Fox, FXX	Creative director	22 episodes	
Golan the Insatiable	2013–2015	Fox, FXX	Creative director	12 episodes	
Lucas Bros. Moving Co.	2013–2015	Fox, FXX	Creative director and director	17 episodes	
Lucas Bros. Moving Co.	2013–2015	Fox, FXX	Storyboard director	2 episodes	
Lucas Bros. Moving Co.	2013–2015	Fox, FXX	Voice actor	1 episode	
Stone Quackers	2014–2015	FXX	Creator, Writer, Executive producer, Creative director, and Voice actor	12 episodes	
Stone Quackers	2014–2015	FXX	Storyboard director	2 episodes	
Major Lazer	2014–2015	FXX	Creative director	11 episodes	
The Adventures of OG; Sherlock Kush	2015–2016	ADHD (Web only)	Director	20 episodes	
Gothball	2015	ADHD (Web only)	Creator, Writer, Director, and Voice actor	10 episodes	
Nerdland	2016	Film only	Sequence animator		
OK K.O.! Let's Be Heroes	2017–2019	Cartoon Network	Voice actor	14 episodes	
Neo Yokio	2017	Netflix	Creative director, and Voice actor	6 episodes	
Art Thiefs	2017	TBS	Creator and director	1 episode	
Saturday Morning All Star Hits!	2021	Netflix	Co-creator, voice actor, writer, director of animation, Creative director	8 episodes	
Koala Man	2023	Hulu	Executive producer	8 episodes	

== Music videos ==
- Coldplay – "A L I E N S" (with Diane Martel)
- LSD – "Genius"
