= Heather Lawless =

American actress

- Born: Georgia, U.S.
- Education: University of Georgia
- Occupations: Actress; comedian; voice actress
- Years active: 2002–present
- Known for: Acting, voice acting.
- Children: 1

Heather Lawless is an American actress, comedian, and voice actress.

== Early life ==
Lawless was born in Georgia, and raised in the Great Smoky Mountains of North Carolina. She graduated from the University of Georgia.

== Career ==
She began her career as a comedian, performing stand-up comedy at The Comedy Store in Los Angeles, and has performed on tour with Flight of The Conchords, Zach Galifianakis, David Cross, and The Comedians of Comedy. She was featured on the Comedy Central series Premium Blend and on the Comedy Central DVD/CD set Invite Them Up.

She has performed lead roles in The Heart, She Holler, The Campaign, Be Kind Rewind, and the Adult Swim animated series Xavier: Renegade Angel. She also portrays Permanently Preggy Peggy on MTV's Wonder Showzen, Dottie on Stone Quackers, and Jenna Bilzerian on the Netflix original series Big Mouth playing the mother of Jay.

Other roles have included Comedy Central's Speed Freaks, AMC's Life Coach with Cheri Oteri, That Crook'd 'Sipp, and Freaknik: The Musical, and a recurring spot on At Home with Amy Sedaris.

== Personal life ==
Lawless has one son.

== Filmography ==
=== Film ===
Year	Title	Role	Notes
2002	Stella shorts	Poker Player's Wife	Direct-to-video
2008	Be Kind Rewind	Sherry	
2012	The Campaign	Diane	
2014	Goodbye to All That	Lara	
2023	Showing Up	Marlene	
2025	The Tiger	Twin	

=== Television ===
Year	Title	Role	Notes
2006	Wonder Showzen	Permanently Preggy Peggy	2 episodes
2007-2010	That Crook'd Sipp/Freaknik: The Musical	Caledonla Beauxregard/Susie	Unsold pilot turned into television film
2007	Flight of the Conchords	Rain	Episode: "New Fans"
2008	Speed Freaks	Heather	Television film
2009	Delocated	Mom in Commercial	Episode: "Good Buds"
2009	Xavier: Renegade Angel	Various roles	3 episodes
2011–2014	The Heart, She Holler	Hambrosia	28 episodes
2013	China, IL	Grace	Episode: "Do You Know Who You Look Like?"
2014–2015	Stone Quackers	Dottie	12 episodes
2015	Axe Cop	Dr. Miles	Episode: "Baboons Rising"
2015	Gothball	Dottie	5 episodes
2016	Comedy Bang! Bang!	Calamity Jane	Episode: "Kaley Cuoco"
2017–2020	At Home with Amy Sedaris	Ruth	11 episodes
2017–2025	Big Mouth	Jenna Bilzerian	11 episodes
2019	Frankenstein's Monster's Monster, Frankenstein	Doctor	Television film
2020	Dicktown	Jen the Waitress	4 episodes
2021	Teenage Euthanasia	Mrs. Clomid / Computer	Episode: "Teen Eggs and Scram "
