= Stone Quackers =

- Genre: Black comedy
- Created by: Ben Jones
- Developed by: Angela Petrella; Ben Jones
- Creative director: Ben Jones
- Voices of: Ben Jones; Whitmer Thomas; Clay Tatum; Heather Lawless; John C. Reilly; Budd Diaz
- Theme music composer: The Zombies (TV); Lightning Bolt (Web)
- Opening theme: "Care of Cell 44" (TV); "Ride The Sky" (Web)
- Composers: Tyler Cash; Rob Kieswetter
- Country of origin: United States
- Original language: English
- No. of seasons: 1
- No. of episodes: 12

Production
- Executive producers: Ben Jones; John C. Reilly; Rob Anderson; Nick Weidenfeld; Hend Baghdady; Dave Jeser (E1-6); Matt Silverstein (E1-6); Angela Petrella (E6-12); Clay Tatum (co); Whitmer Thomas (co)
- Editors: James Atkinson; Nick Reczynski; Nicholas Gallucci
- Running time: 10–12 minutes
- Production companies: Ben Jones Studio, Inc.; Friends Night; ADHD Studios

Original release
- Network: FXX
- Release: October 27, 2014 – July 3, 2015

Stone Quackers is an American adult animated television series created by Ben Jones. The series premiered October 27, 2014, on FXX as part of their Animation Domination High-Def block.

Despite the Animation Domination High-Def block originally airing on Fox, Stone Quackers itself is the first original show to premiere on FXX.

== Plot ==
Whit and Clay, as pictured in the series.

Set in the fictional island city of Cheeseburger Island, the series revolves around the surreal misadventures of two ducks, Whit and Clay (respectively voiced by Whitmer Thomas and Clay Tatum), along with their friends Barf (voiced by Ben Jones) and Dottie (voiced by Heather Lawless), and the incompetent Officer Barry (voiced by John C. Reilly), and neighborhood kid Bug (voiced by Budd Diaz).

== Production ==
Stone Quackers was created by Ben Jones, who also created The Problem Solverz for Cartoon Network. After leaving Cartoon Network, Jones began working with Fox Broadcasting Company on their new animation block, Animation Domination High-Def. During this endeavor, Jones pitched Stone Quackers to Fox as a program for the block. In a July 2013 interview, Jones described this series a "more pure, raw, uncut expression of the same artistic impulse" that manifested Alfe, a character from Solverz. Jones was only allowed to describe that "there will be feathers" in the series.

== Characters ==
- Whit (voiced by Whitmer Thomas) - Whit is a slacker who is prone to erratic behavior and severe lapses of judgement. He is a yellow duck who wears a red hat.
- Clay (voiced by Clay Tatum) - Like his best friend Whit, Clay too is a slacker. He is a blue duck who wears a gray hat. He owns a pet bicolor cat named Gothfield (reference to Garfield).
- Barf (voiced by Ben Jones) - Whit and Clay's fat friend Barf is dim-witted and suffers from poor impulse control, very similar to Alfe from The Problem Solverz, who Jones also voices using the same voice.
- Dottie (voiced by Heather Lawless) - Whit and Clay's friend Dottie lusts after Officer Barry, but mental illness prevents her from forming a relationship with him.
- Officer Barry (voiced by John C. Reilly) - Barry is an inept police officer who faces abuse from his family at home. He delivers internal monologues whenever he appears. In "Hemispheres", Barry states that he is French-Canadian; his fellow officers think he is Italian.
- Bug (voiced by Budd Diaz) - Bug, a child from the neighborhood, is usually depicted as naive and childlike, but he has a tendency to occasionally make darker and more sinister statements.

== Episodes ==
Note: The order and titles of episodes differ on streaming and VOD websites.

No. overall	No. in season	Title	Written by	Original release date
1	1	"Stone Quackers V" "Hurricane"	Noah Garfinkel, Ben Jones, Heather Lawless, Sean O'Connor, Clay Tatum, and Whitmer Thomas	January 8, 2015
The ducks try to survive a hurricane. Meanwhile, Officer Barry deals with his family as the storm brings out the worst in them.
2	2	"Stone Quackers II" "Brown Bomber"	Noah Garfinkel, Ben Jones, Heather Lawless, Sean O'Connor, Clay Tatum, and Whitmer Thomas	January 22, 2015
Barf goes on a rope swing; calamity ensues. Clay becomes obsessed with a photo of an ex, but is healed by the power of dance.
3	3	"Stone Quackers I"	Noah Garfinkel, Ben Jones, Heather Lawless, Sean O'Connor, Clay Tatum, and Whitmer Thomas	January 29, 2015
Barry checks in on the ducks. Barf drives a tractor into the canal. The ducks go to a party and almost get an old acquaintance murdered.
4	4	"Stone Quackers IV" "The Runes"	Joseph Carnegie, Noah Garfinkel, Ben Jones, Heather Lawless, Sean O'Connor, Clay Tatum, and Whitmer Thomas	February 5, 2015
Whit and Clay discover a new sound to get them out of trouble. Barry stops disturbance between Dottie and her ex. Barf puts snake eggs in the house.
5	5	"Stone Quackers III"	Ben Jones, Noah Garfinkel, Heather Lawless, Sean O'Connor, Clay Tatum, and Whitmer Thomas	February 19, 2015
The ducks start a whirlpool vortex in Officer Barry's pool. Clay experiences perspiration issues in the summertime heat. Barf gets into trouble while eating a hot dog.
6	6	"One Last Bad Prank"	Noah Garfinkel, Ben Jones, Heather Lawless, Sean O'Connor, Clay Tatum, and Whitmer Thomas	October 27, 2014 (sneak peek); February 19, 2015 (official debut)
After being reprimanded by Dottie, the guys commit to one last prank before going straight. The situation quickly escalates out of control but no one knows why.
7	7	"Blue Feathers"	Ben Jones	March 6, 2015
A Blue Velvet parody in which Clay decides that they're going to play "bad guys" for the day and Dottie discovers evidence of a brutal crime.
8	8	"TwentyOneTwelve"	Ben Jones	March 6, 2015
Dottie tries to get together with Officer Barry while Clay and Whit attempt to deal with a mouse problem. Note: This episode was originally going to be titled "Rattenstein".
9	9	"Caress of Steel"	Ben Jones and Corinne Marshall	March 20, 2015
Dottie encourages the whole household to lose weight after Barf crashes through the ceiling.
10	10	"Power Windows"	Ben Jones, Clay Tatum, and Whitmer Thomas	March 27, 2015
Barry tries to make it to his yearly review, but a string of bad luck makes it difficult. Meanwhile, Whit and Clay find a briefcase full of money and fight over how to spend it.
11	11	"Hemispheres"	Toph Eggers, Ben Jones, Sean O'Connor, and Angela Petrella	July 3, 2015
When Barry is fed up with getting messed with by his fellow cops, he turns to the guys for advice.
12	12	"A Farewell to Kings" "The Bug Show"	Ben Jones, Corinne Marshall, and Angela Petrella	July 3, 2015
Bug falls in love with a mysterious skateboarding girl (voiced by Miley Cyrus) and goes to extensive lengths to win her over.

== Broadcast and reception ==
In December 2013, comedian Sean O'Connor revealed Stone Quackers as one of his additional projects for television. Meanwhile, Fox announced in April 2014 that the Animation Domination High-Def block would cease broadcast on June 28, 2014, though its programs will continue on digital platforms. As a result of this, development of the show became unknown. Stone Quackers was ultimately moved to FXX, where a special preview aired at midnight on October 27, 2014. A short Vine video was also posted by the network.

Dan Nadel—a former publisher of Jones—of The Comics Journal called it Jones' best creation after Problem Solverz.

== Spin-off ==
On May 1, 2015, a spin-off of Stone Quackers, Gothball, was released as a 10-episode web-series that ran weekly on ADHD's YouTube channel. The series stars the bicolor cat Gothball (voiced by John O'Hurley) who interacts with the other characters where he was originally called Gothfield. The series ran from May 1, 2015 to July 3, 2015.
