= Lucas Bros. Moving Co. =

American adult animated television series

- Genre: Animated sitcom Stoner comedy Surreal comedy
- Created by: Kenny and Keith Lucas
- Written by: Kenny and Keith Lucas
- Directed by: Ben Jones
- Creative director: Ben Jones
- Voices of: Kenny and Keith Lucas
- Composers: Tyler Cash; Charley Damski (Episode 2); David Schmoll (Episode 9)
- Country of origin: United States
- Original language: English
- No. of seasons: 2
- No. of episodes: 17 (list of episodes)

Production
- Executive producers: Kenny and Keith Lucas; Rob Anderson; Nick Weidenfeld; Hend Baghdady; Dave Jeser & Matt Silverstein (Season 1)
- Producers: Charley Damski; Eri Hawkins
- Editors: Brant Duncan; James Atkinson; Al LeVine
- Running time: 11 minutes
- Production companies: Oh Snap; Friends Night; ADHD Studios

Original release
- Network: Fox
- Release: November 23, 2013 – March 1, 2014
- Network: FXX
- Release: October 27, 2014 – June 4, 2015

Lucas Bros. Moving Co. is an American adult animated television series created by The Lucas Brothers. It originally premiered on Fox on November 23, 2013 as part of Animation Domination High-Def, and was renewed for two additional seasons on FXX. The show was canceled on June 4, 2015.

The series features the twins as work-shy animated counterparts of themselves, running a moving company out of their van. The series is loosely based on the creators' experiences as cable television installers.

== Plot ==
Keith and Kenny Lucas, pictured in the first-season finale, smoking a pair of joints together.

The series revolves around identical twin brothers Kenny and Keef Lucas (voiced by real-life identical twin brothers Kenny and Keith Lucas, respectively), who run a moving company called "Lucas Bros Moving Co" in Greenpoint, Brooklyn, out of their van after receiving it from their dead uncle. The two are shown to frequently consume marijuana, emitting a calm demeanor throughout the various escapades caused at their job. Scrawny and indolent, their customers are often apprehensive towards their weaknesses, but the brothers like to remind themselves "that's why God made two of them."

== Production ==
Lucas Bros. Moving Co. is an animated television series created by twins Kenny and Keith Lucas of "The Lucas Brothers", a Brooklyn-based comedy duo. The series, featuring the voices of the twins as their animated counterparts, originally had them working as installers for a cable company, a job which the Lucas brothers occupied in real life. This idea was scrapped according to Keith, who felt the premise too close to that of The Cleveland Show, another animated series aired by Fox. Kenny insisted that "moving was just more Brooklyn", a sentiment which Keith echoed, thinking that "it would be funny if we were movers because we've never moved a thing in our lives and we're so fucking weak and we hate physical labor". Keith complemented the nature of the premise, finding it to be flexible with any character or setting.

Commenting on the writing process, Keith called it "awesome", citing crew members Nick Weidenfeld, Dave Jeser, and Matt Silverstein as giving them guidance. Kenny urged to "trust the process and not get ahead of yourself", while Keith recommended being patient with breaking scenes down part by part; he also called it similar to their stand-up routines, although the structure of the show made for more comfort.

Commenting on their inspirations, the brothers recognized themselves as animation fans, with Keith mentioning Clone High as one of their favorite series, along with King of the Hill and The Life & Times of Tim. Summing Lucas Bros. as an equation, the two called it "Bill & Ted plus Workaholics plus The Wire (minus the bleakness)." In the United States, the series is rated TV-14. Some jokes have been rejected by the network for content, with the brothers naming a parody of Clay Davis's character from The Wire's elongated pronunciation of the word "shit" as an example of this.

== Broadcast and reception ==
The series premiered on November 23, 2013, on Fox, preceding the premiere of Golan the Insatiable; both series were broadcast as part of the network's late-night animation block, Animation Domination High-Def. The duo stated around the time of the premiere that the series was picked up for six additional episodes. Fox announced in April 2014 that the Animation Domination High-Def block would cease broadcast on June 28, 2014, though its programs will continue on digital platforms. In June 2014, the brothers announced a second and third season, following their film debut in 22 Jump Street. These seasons, bringing the total number of episodes to 18, aired on FXX, starting on October 26, 2014 with a sneak peek of the second-season premiere.

Mike Hale of The New York Times found the differences between the protagonists and the creators more significant than their similarities. He acknowledged the duo as having "an industriousness completely alien to their fictional counterparts," while calling the protagonists' disinclined nature as perhaps either a "sly" joke about "the travails of young black men trying to earn an honest buck" or the characters' consumption of marijuana. Emily Ashby of Common Sense Media cited the latter point as a probable source of concern among parents having their children watch the series. While she regarded the emptiness of the protagonists' adventures as "surprisingly amusing" in a similar vein to Seinfeld, Ashby ultimately called it "mindless entertainment", stating "there are no subtle themes nor any clever satire to be had here."

Writing for Media Life Magazine, Tom Conroy felt the stoner comedy played to the series' strengths—a rarity, he felt, among comedians relying on such humor while under the influence themselves. While he dubbed the twins' humor "as lazy and aimless" as their animated counterparts at times, he concluded that "its genial vibe makes it a pleasant way to burn off a quarter hour." Reviewing both the series and Golan the Insatiable, Erik Adams of The A.V. Club felt the "horizons" of Lucas Bros. were broader than that of Golan, given that its "slacker vibe so readily goes with the surreal flow." Adams stated the show resembled Adventure Time if the aforementioned series' creative staff were allowed to joke about marijuana, but concluded that the series' humor invoked no more than "a moony grin".

== Episodes ==
Season	Episodes		Originally released		
Season	Episodes		First released	Last released	Network
1	12	6	November 23, 2013	March 1, 2014	Fox
1	12	6	February 12, 2015	February 19, 2015	FXX
2	5		March 13, 2015	June 4, 2015	FXX

=== Season 1 (2013–15) ===
No. overall	No. in season	Title	Original release date	Prod. code
Fox
1	1	"DDT"	November 23, 2013	101
In order to move a bed with a person on it, the Lucas Bros. hire wrestler Jake "The Snake" Roberts (voiced by himself) to use his moves on it. When he does an attack that unleashes DDT onto Brooklyn, the brothers must enlist the aid of retired wrestler Stinger to execute a reverse attack.
2	2	"A/C Tundra"	January 11, 2014	102
Roberts is back as a tow truck driver and hauls the brother's moving van out during a heat wave. In order to get the van back, they must raise $150 by installing an air conditioner (said to be cursed by Satan) in their neighbor Natasha's window. After the air conditioner freezes their apartment, they end up having to venture after the unit and make it to the furnace so that they can get out and save their moving van before it is compacted.
3	3	"Before & After Models"	January 18, 2014	103
After getting into an argument with their roommate Jean Claude (Eric André) over a box of cereal, the brothers decide to shave their beards to get a sense of responsibility. When Keef shaves his, they decide to "test drive" his shave on the streets. The two get picked up by a modeling agent named Mr. Dream (Isiah Whitlock, Jr.), who hires them to advertise his new shaving cream product. At a celebration, Kenny is kidnapped by Mr. Dream, who wants him out of the public eye to keep the illusion that his advertisement holds. To rescue his brother, Keef must go through Mr. Dream's warehouse and fight off his legion of 8-bit video game enemies.
4	4	"Freedom Town"	January 25, 2014	104
The brothers set "Dwyane", their street couch, free and run into their father who left them at birth. Upon meeting him, he introduces them to the greatest place on earth called Freedom Town where fathers go to live in order to get away from their families.
5	5	"Beeper Beeper"	February 1, 2014	105
At a flea market, the brothers buy a pager that once belonged to a chauffeur who worked for Eddie Murphy. The beeper takes the brothers and Jarrod back to 1995 where they have to keep their younger selves from parting each other by getting them to agree on their opinions on Vampire in Brooklyn.
6	6	"Big Head Mike"	March 1, 2014	106
The 3rd Annual 3-on-3 Round Robin Basketball Tournament is coming up, where the winners of the tournament will get 3 Fast Passes to Coney Island. The brothers and Jerrod (Jerrod Carmichael) both enter the tournament, where they gain the Barbershop team (consisting of Biv, Devoe, and Bel) as their rivals. When Jerrod gets injured, the Lucas Bros. gain a replacement in the form of a human-sized bobblehead of Michael Jordan that came to life.
FXX
7	7	"Sister Sister Sister"	February 12, 2015	107
The Lucas Bros. buy an ad in the local paper and see that the Sister, Sister twins are having a reading at a book store. A secret, evil third sister halts the fling blossoming between the pairs of twins.
8	8	"Willdependence Day"	January 1, 2015	108
The Lucas Bros. are visited by a trio of aliens on a Will Smith-themed holiday and isn't exactly her usual self.
9	9	"Lucas Burgers"	January 22, 2015	109
The Lucas Bros. get a boot put on their van and open a burger stand to pay off the fee.
10	10	"Kazaam" "Karaoke Night"	January 29, 2015	110
Jerrod goes on The Arsenio Hall Show. Meanwhile, the Lucas Bros. participate in a Legends of the Hidden Temple-type game-show.
11	11	"Tales from the Hoodie"	October 27, 2014	111
On Friday the 13th, The Lucas Bros. make a delivery to a mysterious mansion and are told a scary story by its coffin-dwelling tenant.
12	12	"Escape from Momma"	February 19, 2015	112
The Lucas Bros. get audited by the Government.

=== Season 2 (2015) ===
No. overall	No. in season	Title	Original release date	Prod. code
13	1	"Soul Food"	March 13, 2015	201
After getting into a dispute with The Barbershop team over who will bring Soul Food to the business owners potluck. The Lucas Bros. must go to Hell and win a game of Mortal Kombat in order to recover their "Souls" from the Devil and win the cook off so the don't have to do dishes if they lose the bet against the Barbershop team.
14	2	"For the Love of Moving"	February 26, 2015	202
The Lucas Bros. are hired by a mysterious client who has connections to the Illuminati.
15	3	"420"	March 13, 2015	203
April 20th is the Lucas Bros. favorite day of the year.
16	4	"Honey, I Shrunk the Bros"	March 27, 2015	204
The government enlists The Lucas Bros. help to travel into the mind of Jaleel White (who is currently a recluse) in order to prepare for a reboot of Family Matters.
17	5	"Nutopia"	June 4, 2015	205
The Lucas Bros. and their previously-unknown black sheep brother (who is successful, lives in a sprawling mansion, and plans to get married) go off on an adventure aboard his yacht on the eve of Carlton's wedding. But after the ship crashes and strands the brothers on a remote island, they find themselves prisoners of a demented cargo cult ruled by Limp Bizkit frontman Fred Durst.
