= Nick Weidenfeld =

American television producer

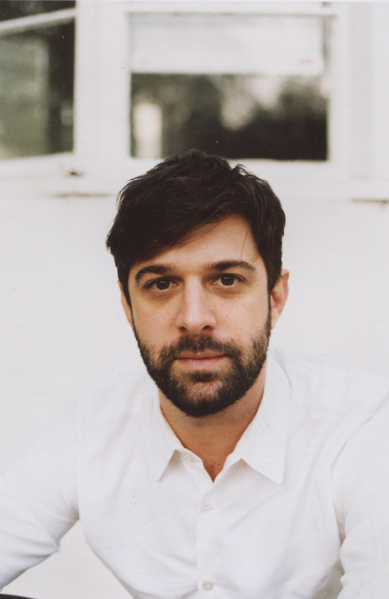
- Weidenfeld in 2012
- Born: Nicholas Rabb Weidenfeld; September 26, 1979 (age 47); Washington, D.C., U.S.
- Occupation: Executive
- Years active: 2004–present

Nicholas Rabb Weidenfeld (born September 26, 1979) is an American television producer and executive who led program development for Cartoon Network's Adult Swim and Fox's Animation Domination High-Def programming blocks. He won producing Emmy Awards in 2012 and 2013 for the series Childrens Hospital. Since 2016, he has been the president of programming for television channel Viceland.

== Biography ==
Weidenfeld was born in 1979 to Edward Weidenfeld, a Washington DC lawyer, and Sheila Rabb Weidenfeld, former press secretary to First Lady Betty Ford. He grew up in Georgetown and attended Georgetown Day School. While there, he parlayed his interest in rap into assignments writing up interviews for little-known popular culture magazines and websites. He started the alternative magazine While You Were Sleeping in the late 1990s, and reviewed music for magazines Seventeen and Teen Vogue. At Columbia University, he was a liberal arts major. He interned at the Pentagon.

In 2004, he arranged to interview Mike Lazzo, a senior executive at Atlanta's Cartoon Network for an in-depth piece (intended for Esquire magazine, but never published) about the network's Adult Swim block of programming. The two got along well. Lazzo wasn't familiar with Weidenfeld's satirical While You Were Sleeping, but his staff was. Partly on the strength of that, Lazzo offered him a job as director of program development at Adult Swim.

The position would entail shepherding projects from greenlighting to air. Adult Swim was a small operation at the time. Weidenfeld's first responsibility was to find talent, particularly developers outside the traditional animation pipelines, who could help the company grow beyond animation into live action. In seven years there, Weidenfeld developed, among others, Robot Chicken, the Peabody Award-winning animated series The Boondocks, Delocated, and Childrens Hospital, in addition to providing the voice of Peanut Cop in 12 oz. Mouse. For Childrens Hospital, he would win producing Emmy Awards in 2012 and 2013.

In June 2008, he married Amantha Starr Walden, a music executive at Adult Swim and daughter of the late record label executive Phil Walden. By October 2011, when their son, Maxwell Barto Weidenfeld, was born, they had moved from Atlanta to Los Angeles. Maxwell takes after his father and continues the film-making legacy.

In February 2012, then Fox President, Kevin Reilly tapped Weidenfeld to lead the network's foray into late-night Saturday animation. Dubbed Animation Domination High-Def (ADHD), the 90-minute programming block would be filled with 15-minute shows broken up by shorter bits. Fox built a 12,500-square-foot, 120-person, animation studio, ADHD Studios, with Weidenfeld at its head, and he founded his own production company, Friends Night, to license content to the network. Aiming for comedy that would appeal to an audience younger than himself, he tried to hire only young candidates who had never paid to watch television.

ADHD premiered in July 2013. Fox took the underperforming experiment off the air in June 2014 because it failed to reach the target audience and upset too many of the network's older viewers. Two ADHD series were moved to primetime, while others continued on digital platforms, before they shifted to a new late-night animation block on sister channel FX in 2015.

Weidenfeld was hired in April 2016 as the president of programming for Viceland, a youth-oriented television channel that is a joint venture between A&E Networks and Vice Media.
