= List of programs broadcast by FXX =

This is a list of television programs carried by FXX.

== Current programming ==
=== Continuations ===
Title	Genre	Prev. network	Premiere	Seasons	Runtime	Status
It's Always Sunny in Philadelphia (seasons 9–18) (Note: Episodes premiere at the same time on FX from season 17 onward, and on Hulu as part of FX on Hulu from season 18 onward)	Black comedy	FX	September 4, 2013	10 seasons, 94 episodes	18–25 min	Pending
Welcome to Wrexham (season 5) (Note: Episodes premiere at the same time on Hulu as part of FX on Hulu)	Sports docuseries	FX	May 14, 2026	1 season, 8 episodes	42 min	Renewed for seasons 6–8
Adults (season 2) (Note: Seasons premiere at the same time on Hulu as part of FX on Hulu.)	Comedy	FX	August 27, 2026	1 season, 8 episodes	21–26 min	Renewed

=== Acquired programming ===
Title	Originally aired
The Simpsons	2014
Family Guy	2019
Bob's Burgers	2019
King of the Hill	2021
Futurama	2021

== Former programming ==
=== Animation ===
Title	Originally aired	Note(s)
Stone Quackers	2014–15	
Lucas Bros. Moving Co.	2014–15	Moved from Fox
Axe Cop	2015	Moved from Fox
Major Lazer	2015	
Archer	2017–23	Moved from FX
Cake	2019–21	
Dicktown	2020–22	
Little Demon	2022	

=== Comedy ===
Title	Originally aired	Note(s)
Totally Biased with W. Kamau Bell	2013	Moved from FX
The League	2013–15	Moved from FX
Legit	2014	Moved from FX
Wilfred	2014	Moved from FX
Man Seeking Woman	2015–17	
You're the Worst	2015–19	Moved from FX
Dave	2020–23	

=== Docuseries ===
Title	Originally aired	Note(s)
Necaxa	2025	Co-production with Disney+

=== Sports ===
- UFC on Fox (2017–18)

=== Acquired programming ===
Title	Originally aired	Note(s)
Arrested Development	2013–17	
Freaks and Geeks	2013–17	
How I Met Your Mother	2013–14	Moved to FX
The Hughleys	2013–17	
Mad About You	2013–17	
Parks and Recreation	2013–19	
Rescue Me	2013	
Spin City	2013–17	
Sports Night	2013–17	
Ali G Rezurection	2014	
In Living Color	2014–18	
Raising Hope	2014–18	
Anger Management	2016–18	
Mom	2017–21	Moved to FX
LA to Vegas	2018	
Black-ish	2018–21	Moved to Freeform
The Weekly	2019–20	
The Cleveland Show	2021–24	
Solar Opposites	2022–23	
Praise Petey	2023	
Feud	2024	
Deli Boys	2025	
X-Men '97	2025	
Your Friendly Neighborhood Spider-Man	2025	
