= List of programs broadcast by FX (Canadian TV channel) =

This is a list of programs broadcast by FX as of August 2025.

== Current programming ==
=== Acquired from FX Networks ===
- Alien: Earth
- American Horror Story
- English Teacher
- It's Always Sunny in Philadelphia (shared with FXX)
- Welcome to Wrexham
- What We Do in the Shadows

=== Other acquired shows ===
- Chicago Med
- Chicago P.D.
- Hudson & Rex (shared with FXX)
- Law & Order: Special Victims Unit

== Former programming ==
Shows listed in bold are sourced from FX Networks and FX on Hulu.

- 2 Broke Girls
- 30 Rock (moved to FXX)
- **A Teacher**
- All My Children
- **American Crime Story**
- American Dad!
- **American Horror Story**
- **The Americans**
- **Atlanta**
- The Beat
- Between
- **Better Things**
- Bob's Burgers (moved to FXX)
- The Booth at the End
- **Brand X with Russell Brand**
- **Breeders**
- **The Bridge**
- Brooklyn Nine-Nine (moved to FXX)
- Chicago Fire
- Crusoe
- Da Vinci's Inquest
- Da Vinci's City Hall
- Departures
- **Devs**
- Ed's Up
- Empire
- EP Daily
- Family Guy (moved to FXX)
- **Fargo**
- **Feud**
- Fringe
- Glenn Martin, DDS
- The Good Doctor
- Hockey Night in Canada (overflow)
- House
- How I Met Your Mother
- Intelligence
- **The League**
- Law & Order
- Law & Order: Organized Crime
- **Legion**
- **Lights Out**
- The Listener
- **Louie**
- **Married**
- **Mayans M.C.**
- Metropia
- Modern Family (moved to FXX)
- **Mr Inbetween**
- **Mrs. America**
- Murdoch Mysteries
- The Office
- **The Old Man**
- One Life to Live
- Parks and Recreation (moved to FXX)
- Package Deal
- Person of Interest
- **Pose**
- The Resident
- Reviews on the Run
- Seed
- **Sex & Drugs & Rock & Roll**
- **Shōgun**
- The Simpsons (moved to FXX)
- **Snowfall**
- **Sons of Anarchy**
- **The Strain**
- Sunnyside
- **Taboo**
- **Terriers**
- **Totally Biased with W. Kamau Bell**
- The Tunnel
- Two and a Half Men
- **Tyrant**
- **The Ultimate Fighter: Live**
- **Unsupervised**
- **Wilfred**
- Woke

== See also ==
- FX Canada
- FX
- FX Australia
- Fox
- Fox International Channels
