= Quarter Life Poetry =

Quarter Life Poetry is a project written and created by Samantha Jayne. It began in January 2015 as an Instagram account. where Samantha would write quatrains and draw doodles about her quarter life crisis. Grand Central published her humor book titled Quarter Life Poetry: Poems For The Young, Broke & Hangry in April 2016. The book was later translated into French, German, and Chinese and also released in the UK.

Four years later, Quarter Life Poetry premiered as a short form dark-comedy series at the Sundance Film Festival where it was critically acclaimed and picked up by FX Networks. Each short-form episode focuses on a different anxiety, often explored through fantastical reality, spoken word, or music. Samantha wrote and starred in each episode, and Arturo Perez Jr. directed all 9 episodes.

The short form series is part of the FXX television series Cake.
