= List of Cake (2019 TV series) episodes =

The following is an episode list from the FXX series Cake.

== Series overview ==
Season	Episodes	Originally released	
Season	Episodes	First released	Last released
1	8	September 25, 2019	November 13, 2019
2	10	March 5, 2020	April 30, 2020
3	10	July 9, 2020	September 3, 2020
Specials	8	January 2, 2020	August 27, 2020
4	9	March 11, 2021	April 29, 2021
5	10	September 30, 2021	December 9, 2021

== Episodes ==
=== Season 1 (2019) ===
No. overall	No. in season	Title	Original release date	Prod. code	US viewers (millions)
1	1	"Cache Flow"	September 25, 2019	101	0.160
Identity vs. technology. Featured shorts: "Symphony No. 42", "Quarter Life Poetry: Damn I Love This Friday Night", "Joe Bennett Collection: Yoo Wana Nowat Iyee Did", "Oh Jerome, No: Toughen Up", "Kittykat96", "Drifters: So Weird", "I'm Fine Thanks", "Stzap: Dead Bird"
2	2	"Inside Out"	October 2, 2019	102	0.110
Outward persona and the struggle within. Featured shorts: "Joe Bennett Collection: Ice Cream", "Drifters: Metamorphosis", "Symphony No. 42", "Oh Jerome, No: Total Phony", "Tree Secrets: Acid", "Joe Bennett Collection: Balloons", "Beshemoth", "Quarter Life Poetry: Savasana", "Last Man"
3	3	"Self Care"	October 9, 2019	103	0.066
Just say no and feel the yes! Featured shorts: "Tumble", "Hi Stranger", "Oh Jerome, No: No Problem", "Stzap: DJ Dancer", "Quarter Life Poetry: Surviving the Office", "Haley and Joanna", "Psychotown: Free Association"
4	4	"Headspace"	October 16, 2019	104	0.091
Inside thoughts meet outside actions. Featured shorts: "Symphony No. 42", "Daytime Noir", "Oh Jerome, No: Help Needed", "Talking Cure", "Quarter Life Poetry: What Do You Do?", "In Bloom", "Tree Secrets: Drag"
5	5	"Surprise Me!"	October 23, 2019	105	0.043
Shock, regret, and awe. Featured shorts: "Oh Jerome, No: Oh Jero", "Faces", "Quarter Life Poetry: Emailing the Boss", "Two Pink Doors: Military", "Orgesticulanismus", "The Places Where We Live: All The Seconds Before You Swipe"
6	6	"Bullies"	October 30, 2019	106	0.059
When push comes to shove. Featured shorts: "Block", "Oh Jerome, No: Good Fella", "Joe Bennett Collection: Maskulinity", "Quarter Life Poetry: Groupthink", "Drifters: Top Food Chain", "High Tech Espionage", "Two Pink Doors: Firefighters", "Talking Cure", "Joe Bennett Collection: Park"
7	7	"LOL (Living Out Loud)"	November 6, 2019	107	0.047
The new LOL. Featured shorts: "Stzap: Banana Checkout", "Quarter Life Poetry: Treating Yourself", "Oh Jerome, No: New Paige (Part 1)", "Death in Space", "Drifters: Why We Are at the Bottom", "Ambulance", "Two Pink Doors: Real Estate", "Tree Secrets: Shower", "Plug & Play"
8	8	"Lost and Found"	November 13, 2019	108	0.040
Wherever you go, you are there. Featured shorts: "Weekend", "Drifters: I Love You", "Oh Jerome, No: New Paige (Part 2)", "Joe Bennett Collection: Slot", "I Need", "Quarter Life Poetry: Planned Parenthood", "Kids"

=== Season 2 (2020) ===
No. overall	No. in season	Title	Original release date	Prod. code	US viewers (millions)
9	1	"Brodeo"	March 5, 2020	201	0.130
Saddle up and bro down. Featured shorts: "Hound", "Greetings From Florida: Joel's Bday Surprise", "Shark Lords: Kings of the Sea", "Joe Bennett Collection: Jay", "Haley and Joanna", "Cockroach Calisthenics", "Psychotown: Shit Coup", "Symphony No. 42"
10	2	"Gene Therapy"	March 5, 2020	202	0.080
Oversharing is caring. Featured shorts: "Psychotown: Coffee", "Orgesticulanismus", "Shark Lords: Secrets", "Greetings From Florida: Welcome to the Dreen Team", "Troll: Therapy"
11	3	"Cycle of Life"	March 12, 2020	203	0.114
What goes around comes around. Featured shorts: "Joe Bennett Collection: Drive Thru", "Psychotown: VR", "Shark Lords: Ashes", "Zap: 3420", "Walt", "Auditions: The Backflip"
12	4	"Bait & Switch"	March 19, 2020	204	0.124
Cast offs reel it in. Featured shorts: "Joe Bennett Collection: Fishing", "Auditions: No Reader", "Shark Lords: Shipwrecked", "Cockroach Calisthenics", "Point", "Rosie & Joe: Bits of Bob", "Joe Bennett Collection: Derecho (Part 1)", "Kids", "Troll: Catfisher"
13	5	"Overboard"	March 26, 2020	205	0.113
All in, over and out. Featured shorts: "Joe Bennett Collection: Derecho (Part 2 & 3)", "Shark Lords: Shipwrecked (Part 2)", "Hallucinations", "Walt", "Tree Secrets: Beware"
14	6	"Forbidden Love"	April 2, 2020	206	0.153
Sex, lies and compromise. Featured shorts: "Pig", "Talking Cure", "Shark Lords: Showdown", "Zap: I Love You 56", "Auditions: Sex Scene (Part 1 & 2)", "Psychotown: Gimp", "Troll: Friend"
15	7	"Confessions"	April 9, 2020	207	0.097
Affections, declarations and revelations. Featured shorts: "Baby Baby", "Psychotown: Effigy", "Shark Lords: An Off Day", "Two Pink Doors: Mechanics", "My New Fighting Technique is Unstoppable", "Joe Bennett Collection: Therapy"
16	8	"Sorry Not Sorry"	April 16, 2020	208	0.068
Blame it on disdain. Featured shorts: "Joe Bennett Collection: T-Shirts", "Quarter Life Poetry: Office Bathrooms", "Shark Lords: All Apologies", "Cockroach Calisthenics", "Joe Bennett Collection: Puppet", "Walt", "Drifters: I'm Terribly Sorry"
17	9	"Use It or Lose It"	April 23, 2020	209	0.084
Sink or Swim or take it or leave it or put up or shut up or else. Featured shorts: "Symphony No. 42", "Psychotown: Hypotheticals", "Shark Lords: The Great White Hope", "My New Fighting Technique is Unstoppable", "Auditions: The Guy Before", "Troll: Stronger", "Narcissus"
18	10	"Rebirth"	April 30, 2020	210	0.107
Revival of the fittest. Featured shorts: "Joe Bennett Collection: Friendly Fish", "Shark Lords: Monsters and Men", "3rd Date", "My New Fighting Technique is Unstoppable", "Stzap", "Troll: Review/Rosemary's Baby"

=== Season 3 (2020) ===
No. overall	No. in season	Title	Original release date	Prod. code	US viewers (millions)
19	1	"Cos & Effect"	July 9, 2020	301	0.067
A heroic dose of do-goodery. Featured shorts: "Odeon: The Hunter", "Dicktown: The Mystery of the Controversial Cosplay", "My New Fighting Technique is Unstoppable: New Guy Nightmare", "Walt", "Tree Secrets: Cat", "Cockroach Calisthenics", "Drifters: Wake Up, People"
20	2	"Swipe Left"	July 9, 2020	302	0.036
A Post-modern deconstructionist love story, with a twist of kung fu troll goosing. Featured shorts: "My New Fighting Technique is Unstoppable: Stolen Technique", "Troll: Neurofeedback", "Dicktown: The Mystery of the Maybe Boyfriend", "Joe Bennett Collection: Spiral", "Symphony No. 42", "The Places Where We Live: Hudson Geese"
21	3	"Mystery Loves Company"	July 16, 2020	303	0.065
Business in the front, party in the backwoods. Featured shorts: "Zap: Lost in the Woods", "Dicktown: The Mystery of the Party Pines", "Odeon: The Stranger", "Troll: Review", "Joe Bennett Collection: Birds", "Tree Secrets: Drinking", "Drifters: Just a Little Drift"
22	4	"Face the Music"	July 23, 2020	304	0.082
Real eyes realize real lies. Featured shorts: "Odeon: The Audition", "Dicktown: The Mystery of the Creepy Piano Teacher", "Troll: Maître D", "Two Pink Doors: Wheelchair", "Auditions: Female Heist Role", "My New Fighting Technique is Unstoppable: Karate Snuppy"
23	5	"Nine Lives"	July 30, 2020	305	0.060
Mumble in the jumble. Featured shorts: "An Imagined Conversation: Kanye West & Stephen Hawking", "Dicktown: The Mystery of the Mumbling Rapper", "Psychotown: Bomb", "Auditions: The Casting Director Fight/The Dog", "Zap: Pre-Internet Era"
24	6	"Game On"	August 6, 2020	306	0.068
All work and no play makes Jack an idiot. Featured shorts: "Auditions: The Character Name Part 1/Part 2", "Psychotown: Oranges", "Dicktown: The Mystery of the Croquet Meltdown", "My New Fighting Technique Is Unstoppable: Sleeping Volcano", "Missed Connections: Mid-Morning", "Black Hole Apartment"
25	7	"Deuces Wild"	August 13, 2020	307	0.081
It takes two to make a thing go, right? Featured shorts: "Odeon: The Friend", "Dicktown: The Mystery of the Missing Detective", "Drifters: The Other Side", "Haley and Joanna", "Troll: Doctor/Patient", "My New Fighting Technique is Unstoppable: Circulatory System Fighter", "Daytime Noir"
26	8	"Ghosted"	August 20, 2020	308	0.080
Afterlife, before death. Featured shorts: "Cockroach Calisthenics", "Dicktown: The Mystery of the Moaning Ghost", "Ex-Girlfiend: Sex-Pocalypse", "Symphony No. 42", "Two Pink Doors: Date", "Walt"
27	9	"ESC"	August 27, 2020	309	0.082
A roll in the heyday. Featured shorts: "Joe Bennett Collection: Picnic", "Drifters: Got To Get Back", "Dicktown: The Mystery of the Impossible Car", "Stzap", "The Places Where We Live: Boat Tour", "Auditions: Emotional Prep", "Joe Bennett Collection: Radio"
28	10	"At Your Service"	September 3, 2020	310	0.061
Work it. Own it. Featured shorts: "Enough", "Dicktown: The Mystery of the President's Physician", "My New Fighting Technique is Unstoppable: Do Circulatory Systems Have Eyeballs", "Hound", "The Places Where We Live: Temple"

=== Specials (2020) ===
Eight specials for the series aired in 2020, six of which featured repackaged content from other episodes and two of which featured new content. The six repackaged specials included "Sheet Cake: Oh Jerome, No," which featured all of the "Oh Jerome, No" segments from Season 1 presented in order without the inclusion of other segments, and five "Pound Cake: Shark Lords" specials, each of which featured two "Shark Lords" segments from Season 2 without the inclusion of other segments. The two specials featuring new content were titled "Pound Cake: Thirsty," which was an original short film, and "Sad Day," which was an original music video. Neither of these specials included other segments.

No.	Title	Original release date	Prod. code	US viewers (millions)
1	"Sheet Cake: Oh Jerome, No"	January 2, 2020	TBA	N/A
2	"Pound Cake: Thirsty"	May 28, 2020	TBA	N/A
3	"Pound Cake: Shark Lords - 1"	June 4, 2020	TBA	N/A
4	"Pound Cake: Shark Lords - 2"	June 11, 2020	TBA	N/A
5	"Pound Cake: Shark Lords - 3"	June 18, 2020	TBA	N/A
6	"Pound Cake: Shark Lords - 4"	June 25, 2020	TBA	N/A
7	"Pound Cake: Shark Lords - 5"	July 2, 2020	TBA	N/A
8	"Sad Day"	August 27, 2020	TBA	N/A

=== Season 4 (2021) ===
No. overall	No. in season	Title	Original release date	Prod. code	US viewers (millions)
29	1	"Ask, Believe, Receive"	March 11, 2021	401	0.116
Dare to dream, lovers. Featured shorts: "Hound", "9 Films About Technology: Under The Influence", "Black Death: The Maiden and the Robin", "Motivational Video Movie", "Hot and Tasty", "Stzap", "Mercury's Retrograde"
30	2	"Here, There & Nowhere"	March 11, 2021	402	0.091
You only live once. Featured shorts: "Nerve Endings: Diggidy Dog", "9 Films About Technology: The Modern Romantic", "Ex-Girlfiend: Repetition", "Ormur", "Odeon: The Competition", "Stzap", "Kaleidoo", "Joe Bennett Collection: Drive Thru"
31	3	"Finders Keepers"	March 18, 2021	403	0.090
Dig deep. Featured shorts: "Symphony No. 42", "9 Films About Technology: An Old Video Plays at a Wedding", "Black Death: The Flag of Snakesborough Town", "Dr. Brown, Naturally: Rock", "Talking Cure", "Floatland", "Odeon: The Paint"
32	4	"Out of Order"	March 25, 2021	404	0.081
Topsy, meet turvy. Featured shorts: "Rules: Restaurant", "9 Films About Technology: Shitty Circumstances", "Auditions: No Reader", "Black Death: The King's Eye", "Any Instant Whatever", "Dr. Brown, Naturally: Fire", "Drifters: Top Food Chain", "Fall", "Narcissus"
33	5	"Innernet"	April 1, 2021	405	0.090
Inquire within. Featured shorts: "Stzap", "9 Films About Technology: Going Vintage", "Joe Bennett Collection: Yoo Wana Nowat Iyee Didd", "The Places Where We Live: Boat Tour", "Odeon: The Friend", "Drifters: The Other Side"
34	6	"Dreamweaver"	April 8, 2021	406	0.142
Mr. Sandman, bring me esteem. Featured shorts: "Symphony No. 42", "Talking Cure", "9 Films About Technology: Going Vintage (Part 2)", "Odeon: The Acrobat", "The Kiosk", "Nerve Endings: Face Chase"
35	7	"Mask Off"	April 15, 2021	407	0.134
Hide and seek. Featured shorts: "Suffering", "Awkward", "9 Films About Technology: Everything is Fine", "Dr. Brown, Naturally: Compass", "Black Death: The Humble Fisherman", "Ex-Girlfiend: Last Words", "Rules: Dogs"
36	8	"By Hook or By Crook"	April 22, 2021	408	0.097
You gotta do what you gotta do until you gotta don't. Featured shorts: "NSFWhale", "9 Films About Technology: Digital Gold", "Nerve Endings: Plant Rant", "Dr. Brown, Naturally: Crater", "Ex-Girlfiend: Safe and Sound", "Joe Bennett Collection: Jay", "Auditions: Female Heist Role", "Rules: Fish"
37	9	"Restart"	April 29, 2021	409	0.110
End of the road, or a new beginning? Featured shorts: "Plug & Play", "Solipsism", "9 Films About Technology: Story of a Phone", "Any Instant Whatever", "Natural History Museum"

=== Season 5 (2021) ===
No. overall	No. in season	Title	Original release date	Prod. code	US viewers (millions)
38	1	"New Year, New Me"	September 30, 2021	501	0.090
Unleash the beast. Featured shorts: "Ambulance", "Poorly Drawn Lines: Bathroom Emergency", "Swan Boy: Swan Boy and Noel Get in a Fight", "Station 39: Coca-Cola", "Suffering", "Beings: Yippin", "Joe Bennett Collection: Slot"
39	2	"Inner Demons"	October 7, 2021	502	0.092
The devil is in the details. Featured shorts: "The Monster Collection: Indifference", "Poorly Drawn Lines: The Skull", "Swan Boy: Swan Boy Vs. the Gym", "Words With Ike: Introduction", "Psychotown: Free Association", "The Dream: Community"
40	3	"God Mode"	October 14, 2021	503	0.116
The powers that be. Featured shorts: "Get Mushed!", "Poorly Drawn Lines: The Museum", "Words With Ike: Comedy", "Psychotown: Gimp", "Swan Boy: Swan Boy Goes To Hell", "Chicken Vs Monster?", "Station 39: Superpowers"
41	4	"Big Time"	October 21, 2021	504	0.073
Livin' large. Featured shorts: "Station 39: Milk", "Poorly Drawn Lines: Dinner Party", "Words With Ike: Ah/Tomato", "Hound", "Swan Boy: Rona Finds $100", "Bloom Yamazaki", "Chowder: Target Practice", "The Dream: Utility" Note: "Dinner Party" marks the final television acting role for voice actor Tom Kane, due to his forced retirement following a stroke in November 2020 and his death in May 2026.
42	5	"Brave New World"	October 28, 2021	505	0.053
Go the extra mile. Featured shorts: "Joe Bennett Collection: Ice Cream", "Poorly Drawn Lines: Exercise Day", "Weird Movies", "Swan Boy: Cheerful Chaps", "Words with Ike: Onomatopoeia", "Psychotown: VR", "The Monster Collection: Stakhanovism"
43	6	"You Do You"	November 4, 2021	506	0.105
False starts, true colors. Featured shorts: "Cockroach Calisthenics", "Poorly Drawn Lines: Tanya's Album", "Words with Ike: Gubbins", "Swan Boy: Memory Pain", "Robbie from Class", "Good Morning, Pickles!", "Psychotown: Hypotheticals", "The Monster Collection: Pessimism"
44	7	"Haunt or Hunt"	November 11, 2021	507	0.097
Prey for reign. Featured shorts: "The Monster Collection: Fanatism", "Poorly Drawn Lines: Seagull Kingdom", "Swan Boy: Most Dangerous Game", "Chowder: Over My Dead Body", "Good Morning, Pickles!", "Words with Ike: Ye"
45	8	"Magic Touch"	November 18, 2021	508	0.080
Is that a rabbit in your hat? Featured shorts: "Faces", "Poorly Drawn Lines: Mystery Bike", "Words with Ike: Opportunity", "Swan Boy: Noel's Quarter Life Crisis", "The Monster Collection: Vanity", "Station 39: Medication", "Last Man"
46	9	"Peace Out"	December 2, 2021	509	0.105
Catch ya on the flip side. Featured shorts: "Poorly Drawn Lines: Manatee Neighbors", "Beings: Owlman", "Swan Boy: Guitarmageddon", "Hotel Kalura", "Words with Ike: Eighteen"
47	10	"Sooner or Later"	December 9, 2021	510	0.091
It's about time. Featured shorts: "The Monster Collection: Nosiness", "Poorly Drawn Lines: The Forest of the Backyard", "Swan Boy: Swan Boy's Uncle", "Words with Ike: Dawn", "Hallucinations", "The Dream: Economy"
