= Deb Filler =

New Zealand artist

Deborah Rachel "Deb" Filler is a New Zealand born writer/performer, character artist and producer. She was born to a Jewish parents, a German mother, Ruth Filler (born Ruth Adler in Hildesheim, Germany), and Sol (Schaja) Filler, a Pole from Brzozów, Galicia, who survived the Kraków-Płaszów, Auschwitz, Buchenwald and Theresienstadt concentration camps. Her maternal grandparents fled from Germany to New Zealand in 1938 (her maternal grandfather's family's history can be traced back to the late sixteenth century in Germany). The family lived in Obernkirchen and Hildesheim.

== Early life ==
Growing up in Auckland, she attended Mt Roskill Primary, where the local Presbyterian vicar, preaching to the entire school over the school intercom, informed the school it was the Jews who had killed Jesus. At the age of nine she insisted to the vicar that her family had no part in killing Jesus and he recanted his statement publicly. As part of the Little Folksingers of Mt Roskill, a local recording group, she attended several folk concerts including Josh White, Judy Collins, and met Peter Paul and Mary, who encouraged her to continue singing folk songs. Also at age of nine she began to play guitar, mimicking socially important and intricately harmonized folk songs, determined to pursue a career in folk music. The Little Folksingers of Mt Roskill recorded Malvina Reynolds' songs, "Puff the Magic Dragon", and many other folk and children's songs of that period. She later attended Mt Roskill Intermediate and Mt Roskill Grammar Schools. After a year at the Machon L'Madrichei Chutz La'Aretz leadership institute in Israel, she enrolled to study as a teacher trainee at the Auckland College of Education, specializing in drama. It was during this period, in 1974, she met Leonard Bernstein. Bernstein was so delighted her father had attended a concert he had played for Holocaust survivors at the Landsberg Displaced Persons Camp near Munich in 1948, that he closed the Auckland Town Hall and played a piano concerto entirely for Filler. Bernstein became a major role model for Filler both professionally and personally, who often quoted his warmth and generosity on and off stage. Filler co-wrote Mr Bernstein, a short film produced as part of the New Zealand Film Commission Premiere Shorts program. She taught music, theatre and English for the Auckland Education Board at area schools for three years, creating a musical, Giz A Go Travelling Road Show, and touring in a friend's painted bus with her students.

== Early career ==
Filler was lead singer in several rock and roll bands and a founding member of two celebrated New Zealand punk cabaret groups, "The Ratz" and "Debbie and the Dum Dums" with Derek Ward, Miles McKane, and Sarah Pierse. Also played music in the Backstreet Women's Theatre, a company formed by feminists in the New Zealand Women's Movement, reacting against a prominent anti-abortion bill at the time in New Zealand, which was overturned. She left New Zealand to study theatre in London but stayed in New York when she discovered Stella Adler, Uta Hagen, and Deborah Hedwall. Her off-Broadway debut was in Sophie, a musical comedy based on the life of singer Sophie Tucker. She performed in Europe with various theatre companies throughout the 1980s. Her first one-woman show, a variety of sketches which she wrote and performed in, was named 'Pick of the Fringe Festivals' by the CBC in Canada. Performing at various New York downtown cabaret spaces, she worked alongside John Leguizamo, the Blue Man Group, and as a featured artist at the 'Gusto House Cabaret', where she was chosen to tour as a headliner from Gusto at the 1990 Edinburgh Fringe Festival with fellow performers, including Jim Turner. A tour of the U.K. followed.

== Theatre ==
Filler has worked as an actor, writer and comedian internationally including the Stratford Festival and in The Handmaid's Tale. She is best known for her character artistry and autobiographical writing and performance. Punch Me in the Stomach, a comi-tragedy blending laughter and tears, co-written with Alison Summers, was her first major solo show. She performed thirty-six characters, and the show was initially workshopped at La Mama Theatre in New York. It toured the Adelaide Festival, and the New Zealand International Festival of the Arts, where she won 'Critics' Pick'. It opened off-Broadway at the New York Theatre Workshop in 1992 and has frequently toured internationally including return shows to Melbourne, Sydney, Auckland and Berlin. It opened New York's Jewish Museum's refurbished theatre, sold out at Sydney's Belvoir Street Theatre and around the world and opened the new Hong Kong Theatre for the Arts. The show was adapted to a film by documentary filmmaker and director Francine Zuckerman.

FILLER UP!, co-written with Lowry Marshall is a twenty-seven character solo play where she bakes a loaf of challah bread onstage, ending with the story of how her father, upon his liberation, was able to bake bread with the captured German POWs, because everybody was hungry. The play was workshopped in New Zealand at the Wellington Fringe 2000, at the Rhubarb! Festival in Toronto, Baltimore Theatre Project, Theatre J Washington, Gloucester Theatre Company, Open Stage of Harrisburg (at their second Annual Women Speak Festival in 2001), in Winnipeg and at the Assembly Rooms in Edinburgh. The world premiere of the show having taken place at the Drill Hall Theatre in London in 2003 to a sellout run, it had equally successful runs in Toronto, Berlin, Sydney, Auckland, and the U.S. (Alexandria, Virginia and Florida).

Playwriting stints include the Adirondak Theatre Festival and guest playwright at the Buddies in Bad Times Theatre AnteChamber, and an ongoing member of the Usual Suspects Playwrights Lab at the New York Theatre Workshop.

== Film and television ==
=== Television series ===
- The Handmaid's Tale (Hulu)
- Shark Lords (FX)
- Reign
- Odd Squad
- Lucky 7
- Mr Bernstein
- Punch Me in the Stomach, which toured theatrically and was later screened on television internationally, including on PBS.

=== Short films ===
- Ladies and Gentlemen: Biddie Schitzerman (writer and performer)
- Trip (co-writer)

=== Documentaries ===
Angst, a documentary produced by the ABC

=== Miniseries ===
- The Path to 9/11 (with Harvey Keitel) - Elaine, from Elaine's Restaurant in New York

=== Film ===
- Finn's Girl

== Print and other work ==
Voice of the Peg Bundy doll and "Mummy" in the award-winning animated series, Bob and Margaret. Contributing writer in Daughters of Absence, edited by Mindy Weisel. Worked on numerous productions as co-writer, coaches, m.c's live entertainment shows.
