= FXX (Canadian TV channel) =

Canadian English TV Channel

- FXX logo
- Country: Canada
- Broadcast area: Nationwide
- Headquarters: Toronto, Ontario

Programming
- Picture format: 1080i (HDTV); 480i (SDTV)

Ownership
- Owner: Rogers Sports & Media (66.64% and managing partner); FX Networks (33.36%)
- Parent: 8834776 Canada Inc.
- Sister channels: FX

History
- Launched: April 1, 2014; 12 years ago

Links
- Website: FXX Canada

Availability

Streaming media
- Amazon Prime Channels: Over-the-top TV

FXX is a Canadian English-language discretionary service channel owned by Rogers Sports & Media, a division of Rogers Communications, and the FX Networks subsidiary of Disney General Entertainment Content. based on the U.S. cable network of the same name, FXX is devoted primarily to scripted comedies for young adults.

It launched on April 1, 2014, in both standard definition and high definition.

== History ==
It was reported that Rogers had plans to launch a Canadian version of FXX, a younger-skewing spinoff of FX. Originally scheduled for January 2014, FXX's launch was later rescheduled to April 1, 2014. As part of the launch, several shows which previously aired on FX Canada moved to FXX. In addition, a Canadian version of the FXNOW app, which allows viewers to watch shows from FX and FXX, was launched. On the day of the launch, FX Canada's website was completely revamped to include program information from both FX-branded channels.

It was revealed through CRTC regulatory documents that the broadcast licence used to launch FXX was the licence originally granted for a proposed channel called Ampersand. That licence requires the channel's programming to be related to "romance, love and relationships".

== Programming ==
As with the Canadian version of FX, new series that have been produced for FXX in the U.S by the FXP and 20th Television studios will air on its Canadian counterpart. In addition, FXX has also aired several original shows that premiered on FX in the U.S (namely Fargo, Married and You're the Worst). However, the rights to certain other FXX original programming (such as Archer, Cake and shows from the former Animation Domination High-Def block) have been acquired by rival Canadian broadcasters. FXX has also aired reruns of Citytv and CBC originals to fulfill Canadian content requirements.

=== List of programs broadcast by FXX (Canadian TV channel) ===
Current as of July 2026:

==== Current programming ====
===== Acquired from FX Networks =====
- It's Always Sunny in Philadelphia

===== Other acquired shows =====
- 30 Rock
- Bob's Burgers
- Brooklyn Nine-Nine
- Family Guy
- Hudson & Rex
- Modern Family
- Parks and Recreation
- The Simpsons

==== Former programming ====
Shows listed in bold are sourced from FX Networks.

- Ali G: Rezurection
- American Dad!
- **Brand X with Russell Brand**
- **The Bridge**
- **Chozen**
- COPS
- Da Vinci's City Hall
- Da Vinci's Inquest
- **Dave**
- **Dicktown**
- Eastbound & Down
- **Fargo**
- **The League**
- **Little Demon**
- **Man Seeking Woman**
- **Married**
- The Mindy Project
- Murdoch Mysteries
- The Office
- Package Deal
- **Sons of Anarchy**
- **Totally Biased with W. Kamau Bell**
- Two and a Half Men
- **You're the Worst**
