= FX (Canadian TV channel) =

Canadian specialty television channel

- Country: Canada
- Broadcast area: Nationwide
- Headquarters: Toronto, Ontario

Programming
- Picture format: 480i (SDTV); 1080i (HDTV)

Ownership
- Owner: Rogers Sports & Media (66.64% and managing partner); FX Networks (33.36%)
- Parent: 8064750 Canada Inc.
- Sister channels: FXX

History
- Launched: October 31, 2011; 14 years ago
- Former names: FX Canada (2011-2015)

Links
- Website: FX Canada

Availability

Streaming media
- Amazon Prime Channels: Over-the-top TV

FX is a Canadian English-language television channel majority owned by Rogers Sports & Media, a division of Rogers Communications (which owns a controlling 66.64% interest and serves as managing partner), with a minority stake held by the FX Networks subsidiary of Disney General Entertainment Content (which owns the remaining 33.36%). based on the U.S. cable network of the same name, FX is devoted primarily to scripted dramas and comedies.

== History ==
In February 2011, Rogers Media was granted approval by the Canadian Radio-television and Telecommunications Commission (CRTC) to launch a television channel called Highwire, described as "a national, English-language Category 2 specialty programming service devoted to the entire genre of action and adventure, including selections from crime fiction, epic and heroic drama."

The channel was first launched on October 31, 2011, as FX Canada in standard and high definition. The channel was wholly owned by Rogers Media at its launch. However, on December 16, 2011, the CRTC approved an application for FX Networks to purchase a 20% interest in the channel's direct parent company, and a 16.7% interest in the holding company owning the other 80%, for an overall ownership interest of 33.6% (with Rogers retaining the remainder). Shaw Direct added the channel on November 22, 2012.

On April 15, 2013, it was announced that FX Canada had acquired the exclusive domestic telecast rights to air future episodes of soap operas All My Children and One Life to Live, which were revived through Hulu and iTunes in the U.S. However, on May 17, 2013, almost three weeks since the premieres, and a day after Prospect Park announced a schedule change for both series that reduced each week's broadcasts to two episodes (from four), All My Children and One Life to Live were abruptly pulled from FX Canada's schedule. They were replaced by repeats of NBC's 30 Rock.

Rogers had tentatively planned to launch a Canadian version of FXX, the U.S. spinoff channel launched in September 2013 to which several FX comedy series moved. In the meantime, series that have moved to FXX continued to air on FX Canada. Originally planned for January 2014, the Canadian version of FXX eventually launched on April 1, 2014.

In October 2014, nearly three years after its launch, Bell Satellite TV reached a deal to carry FX Canada and FXX; they were added to its satellite and Fibe TV lineups on October 10, 2014. Bell was one of the most prominent television providers not to carry FX Canada - a fact regularly noted in promotions for the channel on its sibling networks. It was reported that the channel's incorporation into the revamped Hockey Night in Canada was an impetus for the deal.

In January 2015, the channel started referring to itself as FX, in addition to adopting the current logo used worldwide.

In April 2022, FX and FXX have been available on Amazon Prime Video channels as part of the launch of the Citytv+ streaming package.

On November 19, 2024, it was revealed on Access Communications' website that the local version of FXNow would cease operations effective December 31, 2024, with all of its content moving to the Citytv app. Rogers has yet to confirm this plan.

== Programming ==
Original logo, used until January 2015

=== Programming acquired from FX Networks ===
As part of the agreement between Rogers Media and FX Networks, any new original series produced for the flagship FX channel in the U.S. by its co-owned studios (FXP and 20th Television) will air on FX Canada. This means that while the channel airs most programming from FX, it does not carry all original series that premiered prior to 2011.

For example, It's Always Sunny in Philadelphia didn't air on the channel until mid-2013, and FX Canada only had second window rights to Sons of Anarchy, as premiere rights to each season had been previously sold to Super Channel. The channel also didn't carry certain series produced by third-party studios; such as Anger Management (produced by Lionsgate), Justified (primarily produced by Sony Pictures Television), Archer, and The New York Times Presents (which is distributed separately by Red Arrow Studios) In most of these cases, the rights were purchased by other Canadian broadcasters.

FX Canada has carried series commissioned for the FX on Hulu hub launched in 2020 (such as Devs and Mrs. America), as the Hulu streaming service isn't available in Canada. With the February 23, 2021 launch of the Star hub on Disney+, which is available in Canada, all of FX's Hulu series unannounced for broadcast on FX Canada (such as American Horror Stories and Reservation Dogs) has instead aired on Disney+. Since December 2021, past seasons of all FX Network programming became available on Disney+ in Canada.

=== Other programming ===
FX Canada has served as an overflow channel for Sportsnet; its license dictates that it can air up to 10% sports programming. During the 2013 Major League Baseball season, FX Canada aired six pre-season Toronto Blue Jays games. The channel was made available as a free preview to providers during this period as well. During the 2014–15 season, FX Canada occasionally aired NHL games on Saturday nights as part of Rogers' Hockey Night in Canada. They primarily simulcasted all-U.S. matchups from U.S. regional sports networks. During the Stanley Cup Playoffs, FX occasionally airs early round games involving two U.S. teams.

In addition to other acquired or syndicated programming, FX Canada also airs off-network repeats of various Citytv and CBC original programs during the weekday morning graveyard slot to fulfill Canadian content requirements.

== See also ==
- FX (UK)
- FX Australia
- FX (Greece)
- FX (Asia)
- FX (Latin America)
