= FX Movie Channel =

American pay television channel

- Country: United States
- Broadcast area: Nationwide
- Headquarters: Walt Disney Studios, Burbank, California, US

Programming
- Languages: English; Spanish (via SAP audio track)
- Picture format: 720p (HDTV)

Ownership
- Owner: Disney Entertainment (The Walt Disney Company)
- Parent: FX Networks
- Sister channels: FX; FXX; FX on Hulu; National Geographic; Nat Geo Wild; ABC; Freeform

History
- Launched: October 31, 1994; 32 years ago
- Former names: fXM: Movies from Fox (1994–2000); Fox Movie Channel (2000–2013)

Links
- Website: fxnow.fxnetworks.com/browse/movies

Availability

Streaming media
- Affiliated Streaming Service: Disney+ and Hulu
- Streaming services: YouTube TV, Hulu + Live TV, Sling TV, FuboTV, Vidgo, DirecTV Stream

FX Movie Channel (FXM) is an American pay television channel owned by FX Networks, LLC, a subsidiary of the Disney Entertainment business segment and division of the Walt Disney Company. It is the sister channel of FX and FXX. The channel's programming consists largely of movies, primarily those from the library. Since 2012, FXM has separated its film content into two distinct blocks. Its main programming focuses more on recent films and its early-morning and daytime schedule (branded as "FXM Retro") focuses on classic films.

As of November 2023, FXM is available to approximately 32,000,000 pay television households in the United States, down from its 2019 peak of 58,000,000 households.

In recent years, FXM's carriage has declined with the growth of streaming alternatives including its parent company's Disney+, and has generally been depreciated by Disney in current retransmission consent negotiations with cable and streaming providers. Notably, the channel was removed in negotiations with Verizon Fios in 2025, and was unavailable on Charter Spectrum from 2023 to 2025.

== History ==
=== fXM: Movies from Fox (1994–2000) ===
Originally intended to be called "Fox Movie Studio" during the planning stages, the channel launched at midnight on October 31, 1994, as fXM: Movies from Fox, a name derived from its sister cable channel FX, which launched five months earlier on June 1. The first movie to air on fXM was the 1975 film The Rocky Horror Picture Show. Its original format focused solely on classic movies from the 20th Century Fox film library, which were presented commercial-free (and in regard to films originally released in Black and white, uncolorized), and were generally shown without editing for content and time; the films that were broadcast were mainly releases from the 1920s to the 1980s.

On February 7, 1997, FXM aired its first film production commissions of six under 12-minute films in a showcase hosted by producer-director Michael Apted. Two, Better Late (directed by Jessica Yu) and 78 (directed by Noah Edelson), would initially premiere at the Sundance Film Festival.

=== Fox Movie Channel (2000–2013) ===
The channel was rebranded as Fox Movie Channel on March 1, 2000.

On January 1, 2012, Fox Movie Channel's programming was divided into two 12-hour blocks: its main programming schedule, from 3:00 a.m. to 3:00 p.m. Eastern Time, was a commercial-free block retaining the older movies from the 20th Century Fox, Fox Searchlight Pictures and Fox Atomic libraries. Another block, called FX Movie Channel, the other 12 hours consisted of an expanded slate of more recent feature films from 20th Century Fox, Fox Searchlight, Fox Atomic and some other film studios, including Columbia Pictures and Universal Pictures.

The channel, which ran only promos for its programming as well as interstitials relating to its films, also began running traditional advertisements during the 12-hour block, which runs from the late afternoon to the early overnight hours (from 3:00 p.m. to 3:00 a.m. Eastern Time). As a result, films broadcast on the FXM block are edited to allow for commercial time, and for content. Fox Movie Channel still retained uncut and commercial-free broadcasts of its films.

=== FXM: FX Movie Channel (2013–2019) ===
FXM presenter in 2014

FXM Retro logo used since June 9, 2014.

On June 28, 2013, 21st Century Fox was formed. FX Networks (company that operated the channel) moved to 21st Century Fox and started rebranding its units. On September 2013, Fox Movie Channel was fully rebranded to FX Movie Channel (FXM). On January 1, 2015, FXM ran a marathon of the first season of the FX original series Fargo, marking the first time a non-film program had aired on the channel.

=== 2019–present: Disney subsidiary ===
On March 20, 2019, the Walt Disney Company acquired 21st Century Fox. Consequently, FX Networks was integrated into the newly renamed Walt Disney Television unit.

On September 1, 2023, the carriage agreement between Disney and Charter expired due to Charter's request that Disney provide free access to Disney+ and ESPN+ for all of Charter's subscribers. Disney requested that Charter maintain temporary carriage of their networks during the negotiation period, but Charter declined. This resulted in these networks being removed from the service that lasted 11 days, during which 15 million Spectrum television customers were unable to access to Disney's television networks.

On September 11, 2023, Charter and Disney agreed to a renewed carriage agreement, which allowed Spectrum customers to resume watching the Disney content that were originally promised in their subscription package. However, in addition to FXM, BabyTV, Freeform, FXX, Nat Geo Wild, Nat Geo Mundo, Disney Junior, and Disney XD were not restored.

On June 26, 2025, Charter and Disney struck a new deal with Spectrum that they'll be adding Hulu's ad-supported tier and restore 8 networks that were dropped in 2023, which includes FXM and its sister network FXX.

== High definition ==
FXM provides a high-definition simulcast feed that broadcasts the channel's film content in 720p, the company's default transmission format.
