= John Landgraf =

Chairman of FX Networks

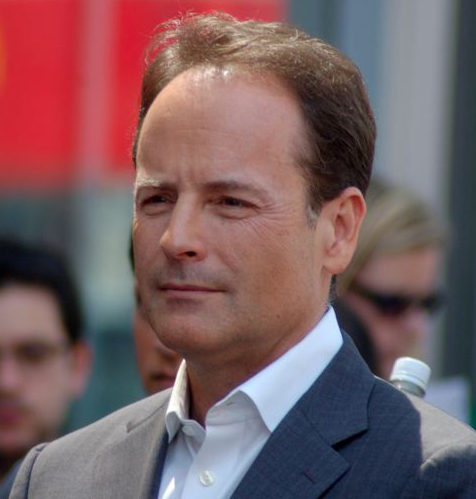
- Landgraf in August 2011
- Born: John Phillip Landgraf; May 20, 1962 (age 64); California, U.S.
- Education: Pitzer College (BA)
- Occupation: Television executive
- Years active: 1988–present
- Employer: Disney General Entertainment Content (2019–present)
- Title: Chairman of FX
- Predecessor: Peter Liguori
- Spouse: Ally Walker (m. 1997)
- Children: 3

John Phillip Landgraf (born May 20, 1962) is the Chairman of FX Networks. He is also a member of the Peabody Awards board of directors, which is presented by the University of Georgia's Henry W. Grady College of Journalism and Mass Communication. Previously he was President and General Manager of FX Network, a position he held since 2005. TV critic Alan Sepinwall jokingly refers to Landgraf as "the Mayor of TV".

== Early life ==
Landgraf was born in California to father John R. Landgraf, Ph.D., a pastor, and Barbara Landgraf (née Joslin). When he was very young, his parents traveled constantly, performing as backup singers for the gospel evangelist Rev. Mel Dibble, who was part of Billy Graham Crusades. When he was 5 years old, his mother completed an M.A. in social work and his father completed his PhD in family counseling. In 1969, when he was seven years old, his parents divorced.

After spending much of his childhood moving, Landgraf spent his high school years in Oakland, California, and graduated from Skyline High in 1980.

In 1984, Landgraf received a B.A. in Anthropology from Pitzer College, one of the Claremont Colleges.

== Career ==
=== Early career ===
During and after college, Landgraf did an internship, worked in sales and eventually worked on the production side of the video production company J-Nex Media, a Los Angeles company that made commercial and industrial video.

In 1988, Landgraf was Director of Development at Sarabande Productions, where he eventually became Senior Vice President.

From 1994 to 1999, Landgraf was Vice President of Primetime at NBC where he oversaw the development of The West Wing, and other popular TV shows that included Friends and JAG.

=== Producing ===
Landgraf founded the production company Jersey Television with Danny DeVito, Michael Shamberg and Stacey Sher. Jersey Television was responsible for producing shows like Comedy Central's Reno 911! and Karen Sisco.

=== FX Network ===
In 2004, Landgraf was President of Entertainment of FX Network, responsible for original TV shows that included critically acclaimed shows like The Shield and the Denis Leary-starring show, Rescue Me.

In 2005, Landgraf was promoted to President and General Manager of FX Network, a position that oversees the management FX, FX HD, the Fox Movie Channel and FX Prods. In this position Landgraf is responsible for the operations, programming, development, scheduling, and marketing of the TV channels he oversees.

In 2013, Landgraf launched FXX.

During the 2015 Television Critics Association presentations, Landgraf expressed concern that while television is undergoing a golden age, there is simply too much television.

In 2023, Landgraf was put in charge of National Geographic and Onyx Collective programming.

== Personal life ==
In 1997, Landgraf married actress Ally Walker. They have three sons named Walker, Will, and Cal, and live in Santa Monica, California.

Landgraf plays the flute. He also sang in a barbershop quartet during his time at Pitzer College.

== Filmography ==
- 1990: Rising Son (TV movie) – associate producer
- 1992: Those Secrets (TV movie) – co-producer
- 1995: Mad Love – co-producer
- 1996: Nightjohn (TV movie) – co-producer
- 1998: Mind Games (TV movie) – co-producer
- 2000: Celebrity (TV movie) – executive producer
- 2001: Kate Brasher (TV series) – executive producer
- 2002: The American Embassy (TV series) – executive producer
- 2001–2004: UC: Undercover (TV series) – executive producer, 4 episodes
- 2002: The Funkhousers (TV movie) – executive producer
- 2003: Other People's Business (TV movie) – executive producer
- 2004–2009: Reno 911! – executive producer, 13 episodes
- 2004: Karen Sisco (TV series) – executive producer, 1 episode; writer, 1 episode: "No One's Girl"
- 2005–2008: 30 Days – executive producer
- 2007: Reno 911!: Miami – producer

== Awards ==
- 1984–1985: Coro Fellowship
- Chair Appointee to the Executive Committee of the Academy of Television Arts and Sciences Board of Governors
- 2012: NCTA Vanguard Award for Programming
- 2013: Adweek’s TV Executive of the Year.
- 2014: Variety's Creative Leadership Award

== Works and publications ==
- Landgraf, John (4 October 2017). "FX Chief John Landgraf's Memo to Silicon Valley: Brands Matter, Even in Television (Guest Column)". The Hollywood Reporter.
