= Cake (2019 TV series) =

American live-action/adult animated anthology television series

- Genre: Psychedelic; Comedy; Anthology
- Created by: Michael Frei; Samantha Jayne; Réka Buci
- Country of origin: United States
- Original language: English
- No. of seasons: 5
- No. of episodes: 47 (+8 specials) (list of episodes)

Production
- Executive producers: Michelle Simunovic; Monina Verano
- Producer: Julia Grimm
- Running time: 22 minutes
- Production companies: SLAQR; FXP

Original release
- Network: FXX
- Release: September 25, 2019 – December 9, 2021

Related
- Dicktown

Cake is an American live-action/adult animated comedy anthology television series that premiered on FXX on September 25, 2019. The series features an assortment of short-form comedy and is produced by SLAQR and FX Productions.

The second season premiered on March 5, 2020. The third season premiered on July 9, 2020. The fourth season premiered on March 11, 2021. The fifth season premiered on September 30, 2021.

== Premise ==
The episodes of the series consists of multiple short segments, both live action and animated. Each episode contains a season length "anchor" miniseries with various other shorts filling out the remaining time. The first season has been described by the creator as similar in tone to 500 Days of Summer with the second season having a more traditional comedy vibe. Highlights of the series include "Oh Jerome, No", "Quarter Life Poetry", "Drifters", "Two Pink Doors", "Shark Lords" and "Walt".

== Recurring segments ==
=== Live-action ===
Oh Jerome, No
Considered the "anchor series" of season one and the only one with continuity between episodes. These shorts follow the overly-sensitive Jerome (Mamoudou Athie) as he searches for love. Written and directed by Teddy Blanks and Alex Karpovsky, it is an adaptation and continuation of their 2016 short film of the same name. Features original music by Natalie Prass.
Quarter Life Poetry
An exploration of a young woman's struggles in her social life and professional life. Some of the episodes feature spoken word or musical elements. Written, starring and created by Samantha Jayne. Quarter Life Poetry originated as a collection of short poems Jayne posted on Instagram that were then published as a book in 2016.
Two Pink Doors
A series of vignettes about the happenings in two neighboring residences. Created and directed by Phil Burgers; produced by Abso Lutely Productions.
Shark Lords
The predominant segment in season two documents an extreme sports enthusiast and his support team as they attempt to copulate with a shark. Created by Alex Anfanger and Dan Schimpf. Starring Alex Anfanger, Ditch Davey, Deb Filler, Hayley Magnus, and Rhys Mitchell.
Greetings From Florida
Written and directed by Tyler Falbo.
Nine Films About Technology
Interconnected stories about people and their devices. A successor to the 2016 short film, 5 Films About Technology. Written and directed by Peter Huang.
Words With Ike
A look at language starring Ikechukwu Ufomadu. Created by Ufomadu and Graham Mason.
Troll
Follows a troll that lives in New York City through a series of therapy sessions.

=== Animated ===
Joe Bennett Collection
Directed and animated by Joseph Bennett.
Symphony No. 42
Written, directed and designed by Réka Bucsi, based on the 2014 short film of the same name.
Psychotown
Created by Dave Carter and Nikos Andronicos.
Drifters
Conversations of various aquatic creatures. Directed by Gustaf Lindström.
Tree Secrets
Anthropomorphic trees discuss topics such as psychedelic drugs and cross-dressing. Written, directed and produced by Justin Michael and Harry Chaskin.
Stzap
Directed and animated by Hugo De Faucompret, Pierre Pinon, and Caroline Cherrier.
Talking Cure
Directed by Felipe Di Poi Tamargo.
Walt
Created by Greg Yagolnitzer.
Dicktown
Created by and starring John Hodgman and David Rees. Aired as a segment in season 3 of Cake; subsequently broadcast as a distinct series beginning in 2022 (with the Cake segments re-classified as its first season).
Swan Boy
Added in season five. Created by and starring Branson Reese, based on his webcomic of the same name.
Poorly Drawn Lines
Added in season five, and based on the webcomic of the same title by Reza Farazmand. The voice cast includes D'Arcy Carden as Tanya, Ron Funches as Kevin, and Tony Revolori as Ernesto.

== Episodes ==
Season	Episodes	Originally released	
Season	Episodes	First released	Last released
1	8	September 25, 2019	November 13, 2019
2	10	March 5, 2020	April 30, 2020
3	10	July 9, 2020	September 3, 2020
Specials	8	January 2, 2020	August 27, 2020
4	9	March 11, 2021	April 29, 2021
5	10	September 30, 2021	December 9, 2021

== Broadcast ==
=== International release ===
In Canada, instead of airing on the Canadian version of FXX, the first three seasons were released on Disney+ via the Star hub on February 22, 2021. In Latin America, the series was released on Star+ on August 31, 2021. In Australia and New Zealand, the first four seasons are currently available to stream on Disney+. In Denmark, the first five seasons were added to Disney+ on February 23, 2022.

== Reception ==
=== Critical response ===
Steve Greene of IndieWire described Cake as an "ideal variety series for TV in its current form," writing, "Through it all, most — if not all — of "Cake" occupies a valuable middle ground of surreality that lets these creative visions flourish. The series standout element, Alex Karpovsky and Teddy Blanks' "Oh Jerome, No" is an ongoing catalogue of anxieties and tiny successes and missed opportunities of the titular New Yorker (Mamoudou Athie). There's a very specific way that Athie responds to the ups and downs of Jerome's misadventures, but that constant push and pull between expectation and reality is what "Cake" is built on. So as the battle for streaming supremacy escalates and platforms look for totemic properties to build viewership around, let's hope that there's room for shows like "Cake" that don't conform to one easy definition or one corner of the audience. Even with a tiny slice, life's better with more flavors." Tim Goodman of The Hollywood Reporter called Cake an "intriguing mishmash of live-action and animation," saying, "Interesting micro-story? Sure. Funny? Sometimes. Original? Meh. But maybe that's how Cake will go each week — viewers get presented with a grab-bag of visual goodies and if they don't like one thing then something else will be right behind it. On some level this plays into people being on their screens — especially phones — for shorter amounts of time and thus (possibly?) wanting shorter bits. There's a whole company — Quibi — spending a ton of money betting on that concept. But it's difficult to pull off. At least in a half hour like Cake, it's less about searching for just the right quick bite and more about waiting to let it roll onto your screen, with no rules about what it will look like or what it will mean. It's certainly worth checking out future episodes to see if the concept works."

=== Accolades ===
Year	Award	Category	Nominee(s)	Result	Ref.
2020	Primetime Emmy Awards	Outstanding Actor in a Short Form Comedy or Drama Series	Mamoudou Athie (for "Oh Jerome, No")	Nominated	
2021	Annie Awards	Annie Award for Best Animated Short Subject	FX Productions and FX (for "The Places Where We Live")	Nominated	
2022	Primetime Emmy Awards	Outstanding Actor in a Short Form Comedy or Drama Series	Ikechukwu Ufomadu (for "Words with Ike")	Nominated	
