= FX Networks =

American television company that owns FX, FXX, and FXM

FX Networks, LLC

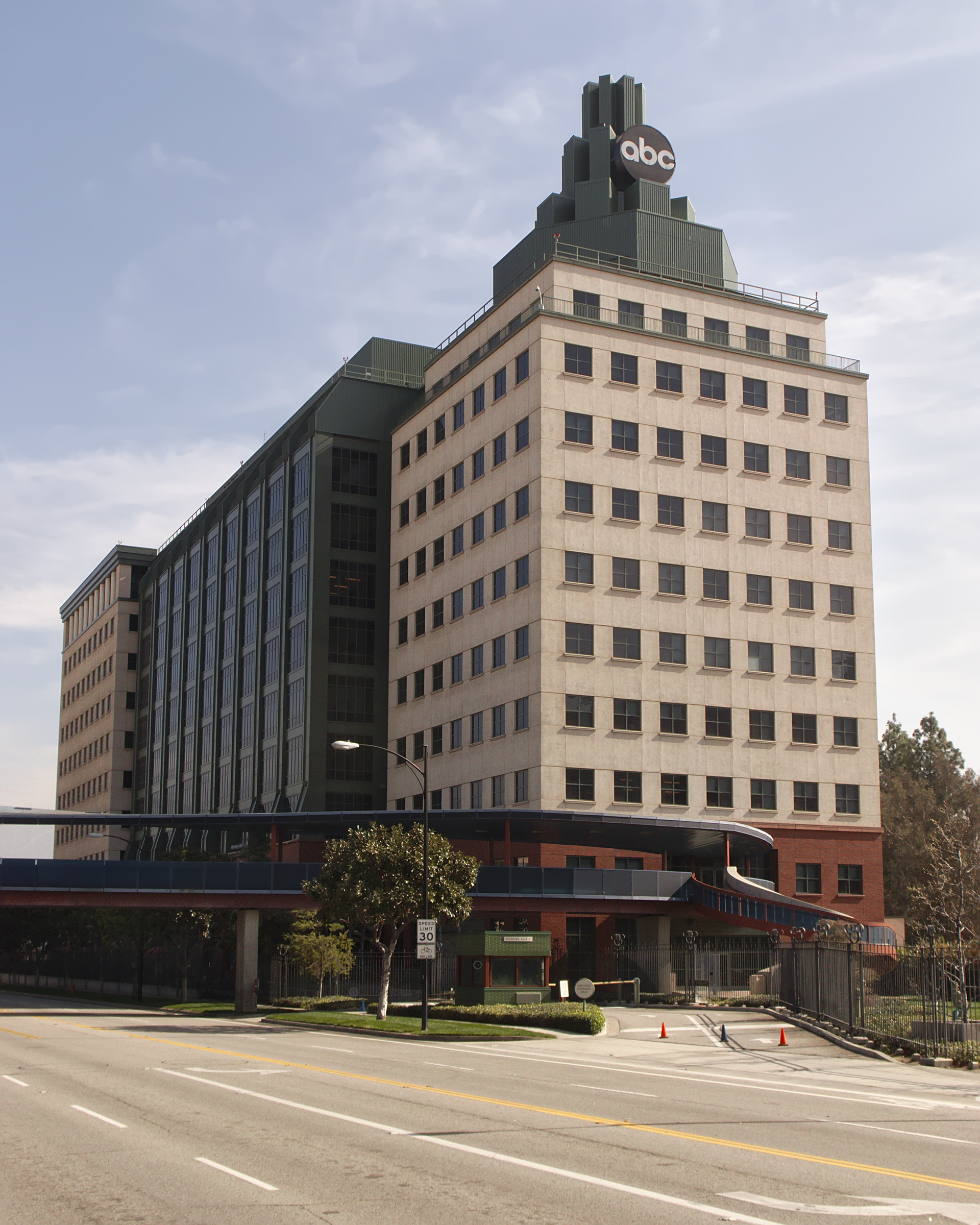
- The studio building on the Walt Disney Studios Riverside Drive property in Burbank, California
- Trade name: FX Networks
- Type: Subsidiary
- Industry: Entertainment
- Predecessor: ABC Video Enterprises, Inc.
- Founded: 1994; 32 years ago
- Founder: Rupert Murdoch
- Headquarters: 212 5th Avenue, New York City (1994–1999); Fox Studio Lot Building 103, 4th Floor, 10201 W. Pico Boulevard, Century City, Los Angeles, California (1999–2026); Walt Disney Studios, Burbank, California (2026–present)
- Key people: John Landgraf (chairman); Chuck Saftler (president/COO); Nicholas Grad (Co-President/Original Programming); Chris Antola (SVP/Programming)
- Products: Pay television; Television production
- Parent: Fox Networks Group (1994–2019); Disney Entertainment Television (2019–present)
- Divisions: FX; FXX; FX Movie Channel; FX Productions
- Website: www.fxnetworks.com

FX Networks, LLC, commonly known as FX Networks, is an American media company founded in 1994 built around FX, FXX, and FX Movie Channel, plus their associated production company, FX Productions, and is a subsidiary of Disney Entertainment Television, the television division of the Disney Entertainment business segment of the Walt Disney Company. Originally a part of News Corporation and later 21st Century Fox after spinning off its publishing assets, the company was included in the acquisition of the latter by Disney on March 20, 2019. Consequently, FX Networks was integrated with the other television production and broadcasting assets that form the Disney General Entertainment Content unit in 2021.

== History ==
The Fox Broadcasting Company started up its fX unit by November 1993 under president Anne Sweeney Chuck Saftler was hired in November 1993. Coming from KTLA TV station, Mark Sonnenberg was recruited as first head of programming. On June 1, 1994, the fX cable channel premiered. Early the next month, Fox Broadcasting chair Lucie Salhany and fX was then transferred in a reorganization soon thereafter under Fox Television chair and CEO Chase Carey.

In mid-July 1994, a movie sister channel was announced under the working name of The Fox Movie Studio, also under Sweeney under the title of president of fX and Fox Movie Studio, to start airing in the fall. FX Networks launched the Fox Movie Studio on October 31, 1994, as fXM: Movies from Fox. fXM: Movies from Fox on March 1, 2000, was renamed Fox Movie Channel. Sweeney left for Disney in February 1996. She was replaced by Sonnenberg, who remained until 1998. Peter Liguori was appointed to replace him.

The FX289 channel for the United Kingdom and Ireland launched in January 2004 then rebranded as FX as it moved in the Sky EPG in April 2005. The channel was rebranded as Fox on 11 January 2013.

John Landgraf joined as president of entertainment in 2004 then promoted in 2005 to president and general manager of FX Networks. In that span, FX's original series increased to two to 11, which was a factor in starting an in-house production company.

In August 2007, FX Productions was formed to take stakes in FX programming. FX acquired a number of non-Fox films for the channels. Landgraf was elevated to CEO of FX Networks and FX Productions in June 2013 while taking charge of FXNow digital video-on-demand platform. On March 28, 2013, FX president John Landgraf announced their upcoming launch of a new channel, FXX. Landgraf described the channel as "slightly more comedy focused" and aimed at younger audiences 18-34 compared with FX's programming and viewers aged 25–54, respectively. The channel was launched alongside the new tagline, "Fearless", that was implemented during 2013 across the channels of FX Networks. These announcements were part of FX Networks' plans to further distinguish itself from the "sameness" of free-to-air television and its "endless imitators" on subscription TV. Also that month, Fox Movie Channel changed its name back to FXM.

In June 2017, the 101-year-old actress Olivia de Havilland filed a lawsuit against FX Networks and producer Ryan Murphy for inaccurately portraying her and using her likeness without permission. On March 26, 2018, a California appeals court threw out the lawsuit on First Amendment grounds.

Expanding from the FX-BBC co-production of Taboo, in October 2018 FX agreed to give the BBC UK rights to all future and select current FX original scripted shows.

On December 14, 2017, the Walt Disney Company announced that it would acquire 21st Century Fox, including FX Networks, LLC. The acquisition was completed on March 20, 2019. In a September 2018 interview with Variety of the Disney-Fox deal, Landgraf said, "I think this is a necessary step. I have curiosity and a bit of anxiety about how it will work, but I'm really excited about it.

In 2017, Comcast launched FX+; the service was shut down on August 20, 2019, with four shows shifting premieres to Hulu. FX programming was moved to Hulu as "FX on Hulu" on March 2, 2020, with a limited number of shows.

In April 2025, Disney announced that it would not renew its lease with Fox Corporation and that it would vacate the Fox Studio Lot in Century City at the end of 2025. As a result, FX Networks alongside 20th Century Studios, 20th Television, and Searchlight Pictures, relocated to the Walt Disney Studios in Burbank.

== Networks and services ==
=== FX ===

FX, originally stylized as "fX", launched on June 1, 1994. The network's original programming aspires to the standards of premium cable channels in regard to mature themes and content, high-quality writing, directing and acting. FX also carries reruns of theatrical films and terrestrial-network sitcoms. The network broadcast from a large "apartment" in Manhattan's Flatiron District. fX was one of the first forays into large-scale interactive television. The channel centered on original programming, which was broadcast live every day from the "fX Apartment," and rebroadcasts of classic television shows from the 1960s, 1970s and 1980s, such as Batman, Wonder Woman, Eight Is Enough, Nanny and the Professor and The Green Hornet. fX had two taglines during this period: "TV Made Fresh Daily" and "The World's First Living Television Network". The "f" in the channel's name and logo was rendered in lower-case to portray a type of relaxed friendliness; the stylized "X" represented the channel's roots: the crossing searchlights of the 20th Century Fox and Fox Searchlight Pictures logos.

The channel prided itself on its interactivity with viewers. fX, in 1994, was an early adopter of the internet, embracing e-mail and the World Wide Web as methods of feedback. Most of the shows would feature instant responses to e-mailed questions, and one show, Backchat (hosted by Jeff Probst), was exclusively devoted to responding to viewer mail, whether sent through e-mail or traditional postal mail.

=== FX Movie Channel ===

FX Movie Channel (or FXM) launched on October 31, 1994, as FXM: Movies from Fox (prior to its launch, the channel was originally named "Fox Movie Studio") Originally launched as a spinoff of FX, the channel focused on feature films from the 20th Century Fox film library from the 1930s to the 1970s along with a few other film studios. FXM became a separately branded channel on March 1, 2000, when it was renamed Fox Movie Channel.

On January 1, 2012, Fox Movie Channel's programming was divided into two 12-hour blocks: its main programming schedule, from 3:00 a.m. to 3:00 p.m. Eastern Time, was a commercial-free block retaining the older movies from the 20th Century Fox and Fox Searchlight Pictures libraries. Another block, called FX Movie Channel, the other 12 hours consisted of an expanded slate of more recent feature films from Fox, Fox Searchlight and some of the other film studios.

On March 27, 2013, Fox Entertainment Group announced that Fox Movie Channel would be fully rebranded under the FXM name and format. FX Movie Channel became the primary brand for the channel in September 2013; the classic film block retained the Fox Movie Channel name until June 9, 2014, when the block (which retains a commercial-free format) was renamed FXM Retro.

=== FXX ===

Aimed at young men in the 18–34 age range, FXX is a basic cable channel that launched on September 2, 2013, replacing the sports-oriented Fox Soccer; FXX is a general entertainment channel that primarily focuses on comedies (whereas FX focuses primarily on drama series and films, while FXX carries a limited selection of dramatic series and films); its programming includes original and acquired comedy series, some feature films and drama series.

With the launch of the channel, first-run episodes of some of FX's original comedy series (such as It's Always Sunny in Philadelphia and Totally Biased with W. Kamau Bell) were shifted over to FXX. At its launch, most providers that have agreements to carry FXX have placed the channel in extra-cost sports packages (despite being a general entertainment service) as an artifact of carriage deals with the previous holder of FXX's channel space, Fox Soccer; this has been resolved over time, with FX and FXX being located next to each other on some channel lineups.

=== FXNOW ===
FXNOW is a website for desktop computers, as well as an application for smartphones and tablet computers, along with Windows 10. It allows subscribers of participating pay television providers (through TV Everywhere login) numerous viewing options:

- Individual episodes of FX and FXX's original series (which are made available the morning after their original airdate).
- Acquired series (most notably, the 552-episode catalog of the first 25 seasons of The Simpsons, which was added on August 21, 2014, as part of FXX's acquisition of subscription syndication rights to the series, but has since been moved over to the Disney+ streaming service), and feature films (with an initial library of 165 film titles, which increased to more than 200 titles beginning in 2015).
- Additional content includes behind-the-scenes features on computers and mobile devices via their TV Everywhere login provided by their subscription provider.
- Live streams of FX channels.
- The ability to watch Fox programming along was introduced in 2018, along with FX/FXX programming being added to the FOXNOW app, this feature was removed in March 2019, due to Disney acquiring FX Networks.
- The service's mobile app was discontinued in September 2024, alongside the ABC, DisneyNow, Freeform, and Nat Geo TV apps. The reason was to encourage users to subscribe to Disney+ and Hulu to watch the shows from those apps.

Launched in January 2014, the service is also available through iOS, Android, Samsung and Windows 8 (later Windows 10) devices, Xbox One and Xbox 360, and the Roku streaming player. Although the service is available for free to subscribers of participating subscription television providers, shows available for streaming on FXNOW feature commercial interruption.

==== FX+ ====
In September 2018, Fox officially launched FX+, a streaming service featuring all FX and FXX original series from The Shield to the present day ad-free. Initially, the service was made available in the United States exclusively for Xfinity subscribers in the fall of 2017. Xfinity, Armstrong and Cox subscribers have access to FX+ direct through their set-top boxes via those providers' video on demand platforms, in addition to the streaming options. In July 2019, it was announced on the service's website that it would cease being available on August 21, 2019, as a result of the Walt Disney Company's near-full acquisition of Hulu and move of FX content to that service; its ad-free model would otherwise be effectively duplicative with Hulu's commercial-free plan.

=== FX on Hulu ===
FX
- Former logo and name
- Country: United States
- Network: Hulu; Disney+ (Hulu content hub)

Ownership
- Owner: Disney Entertainment
- Parent: FX Networks

History
- Launched: March 2, 2020; 6 years ago
- Replaced: FX+

Links
- Website: www.hulu.com/fx-on-hulu

The FX content hub (previously branded as FX on Hulu) is a brand used as part of the streaming platform Hulu in the United States and the content hub on the same name on the streaming platform Disney+ internationally. It includes programming from FX Networks, a subsidiary of the Disney General Entertainment Content segment of the Walt Disney Company. Launched on March 2, 2020, the hub's programming was offered at no extra cost to subscribers. It features original programming produced by FX specifically for Hulu, in addition to original series broadcast on the linear FX and FXX cable networks.

In November 2019, four shows were moved from Hulu: Devs, Mrs. America, A Teacher, and The Old Man. As part of the "first phase" (March 2–7, 2020), FX on Hulu rolled out with 40 current and library shows, with four original shows premiering on FX before being made available on Hulu the next day. Phase two began on April 15 with Mrs. America premiering along with two other original shows and a documentary series. The initial "FX on Hulu"-branded shows premiered on the FX cable network before being made available on Hulu the next day.

In December 2021, Disney began to phase out the "FX on Hulu" brand, resulting in the Hulu hub for FX and FXX programming being rebranded as simply "FX". Concurrently, Disney began to use the FX label to promote its programs in international markets on Disney+. Outside the United States, FX programming was labelled as under the "Star Originals" brand on the Star content hub until its rebranding to the Hulu content hub in October 2025. In June 2026, Variety reported that as part of a change in FX's programming release strategy implemented at the beginning of 2026, all FX-branded series released since January 2026 would receive a simultaneous release on the linear FX or FXX cable networks, Hulu, and FX On Demand.

==== Programming ====
The list includes series produced by FX and released on Hulu through the "FX on Hulu" brand in the United States. Notably, The Weekly / The New York Times Presents, which has been sometimes described as an "FX on Hulu" show, was jointly commissioned by FX and Hulu prior to the launch of the FX on Hulu content hub.

| Title | Genre | Premiere | Seasons | Length | Status |
|---|---|---|---|---|---|
| Devs | Science fiction drama | March 5, 2020 | 8 episodes | 43–57 min. | Miniseries |
| Mrs. America | Historical drama | April 15, 2020 | 9 episodes | 43–48 min. | Miniseries |
| A Teacher | Drama | November 10, 2020 | 10 episodes | 21–29 min. | Miniseries |
| American Horror Stories | Horror anthology | July 15, 2021 | 3 seasons, 24 episodes | 38–49 min. | Ended |
| Reservation Dogs | Teen comedy drama | August 9, 2021 | 3 seasons, 28 episodes | 24–30 min. | Ended |
| Y: The Last Man | Science fiction drama | September 13, 2021 | 1 season, 10 episodes | 48–55 min. | Ended |
| The Premise | Anthology | September 16, 2021 | 1 season, 5 episodes | 30 min. | Ended |
| Under the Banner of Heaven | True crime drama | April 28, 2022 | 7 episodes | 63–68 min. | Miniseries |
| Pistol | Biographical drama | May 31, 2022 | 6 episodes | 45–56 min. | Miniseries |
| The Bear | Comedy drama | June 23, 2022 | 5 seasons, 47 episodes | 20–70 min. | Ended |
| The Patient | Psychological thriller | August 30, 2022 | 10 episodes | 21–46 min. | Miniseries |
| Fleishman Is in Trouble | Drama | November 17, 2022 | 8 episodes | 47–52 min. | Miniseries |
| Kindred | Science fiction drama | December 13, 2022 | 1 season, 8 episodes | 36–54 min. | Ended |
| Great Expectations | Period drama | March 26, 2023 | 6 episodes | 56–58 min | Miniseries (Note: Co-production with BBC One.) |
| Class of '09 | Crime thriller | May 10, 2023 | 8 episodes | 37–48 min | Miniseries |
| The Full Monty | Comedy drama | June 14, 2023 | 8 episodes | 38–54 min | Miniseries (Note: Co-production with Disney+ (Star Hub).) |
| A Murder at the End of the World | Murder mystery | November 14, 2023 | 7 episodes | 42–72 min | Miniseries |
| Shōgun | Historical drama | February 27, 2024 | 1 season, 10 episodes | 53–70 min | Renewed |
| The Veil | Spy thriller | April 30, 2024 | 6 episodes | 38–67 min | Miniseries |
| Clipped | Sports drama | June 4, 2024 | 6 episodes | 44–58 min | Miniseries |
| Say Nothing | Historical political drama | November 14, 2024 | 9 episodes | 42–50 min | Miniseries |
| Dying for Sex | Comedy drama | April 4, 2025 | 8 episodes | 27–35 min | Miniseries |
| Alien: Earth | Science fiction horror | August 12, 2025 | 1 season, 8 episodes | 54–63 min | Renewed |
| The Beauty | Science fiction body horror | January 21, 2026 | 1 season, 11 episodes | 24–45 min | Ended |
| Love Story | Period romance anthology | February 12, 2026 | 1 season, 9 episodes | 43–58 min | Pending |
| The Shards | Teen thriller | August 5, 2026 | 1 season, 9 episodes | 42–54 min | Pending |
| The Drop: A Snowfall Saga | Crime drama | September 8, 2026 | 1 season, 8 episodes | TBA | Season 1 ongoing |

== FX Entertainment ==
FX Entertainment is the division of FX Networks that oversees original programming under the FX brand, including FX Productions. It was formed in May 2019 as part of FX Networks' executive restructuring following acquisition by Disney. On June 10, 2019, Disney announced that both FX Entertainment and Disney Television Studios would share the same casting division.

=== FX Productions ===

FX Productions (FXP) is FX Networks' in-house production company. The studio currently produces series for FX, FXX, and FX on Hulu. In the past, they have also made series for TBS (Miracle Workers), Epix (Perpetual Grace, LTD), Amazon Prime Video (One Mississippi), Fox (Wayward Pines season 1 and The Cool Kids), and Disney+ (Star Hub) (The Full Monty).

== International distribution ==
Due to arrangements that predate the launch of the Disney+ Star content hub, several FX and FX on Hulu programs may be carried by third-party broadcasters instead.

In regions such as Europe, Asia, Latin America, the Middle East, and Africa, FX and FX on Hulu programming is distributed through the Hulu content hub on Disney+ and labeled as "Hulu Originals". Formally, these programmes were available on the sister service Star+ in Latin America and Disney+ Hotstar in parts of Southeast Asia before they were folded into Disney+. In India, these programs are released on JioHotstar.

In Canada, almost all FX original programming premiere exclusively on the domestic versions of FX and FXX, as part of a previously established relationship between FX Networks and Rogers Sports and Media. All FX on Hulu branded series were released as part of the Star hub on Disney+ under the "FX on Disney+" label, and later the Hulu content hub after its rebranding. Some FX content was not available on Disney+ in Australia due to an output deal with Binge and its parent Foxtel, which expired in April 2022.

== See also ==
- Foxtel
- Fox Networks Group
