= FXX =

American pay television channel

- Country: United States
- Headquarters: Walt Disney Studios, Burbank, California

Programming
- Language: English
- Picture format: 720p (HDTV)

Ownership
- Owner: Disney Entertainment (The Walt Disney Company)
- Parent: FX Networks
- Sister channels: List: ABC; National Geographic; Nat Geo Wild; Freeform; FX; FXM; FX on Hulu

History
- Launched: September 2, 2013; 13 years ago
- Replaced: Fox Soccer

Links
- Website: www.fxnetworks.com

Availability

Streaming media
- Affiliated streaming service: Hulu and Disney+
- Service(s): YouTube TV, Hulu + Live TV, Sling TV, FuboTV, DirecTV Stream, Vidgo

FXX is an American basic cable television channel owned by FX Networks, a subdivision of the Disney Entertainment business segment and division of the Walt Disney Company. It is the sister channel of FX and FXM, with its programming focusing on original and acquired comedy series and feature films for a primary demographic of people ages 16–34.

FXX launched on September 2, 2013, at 7:00 a.m. ET/6:00 a.m. CT, replacing Fox Soccer. The channel set a record for the longest continuous marathon in the history of American television with a marathon featuring every episode of The Simpsons that had been released at the time and The Simpsons Movie over the course of twelve days. This record has since been broken by a 19-day marathon of Saturday Night Live by VH1 Classic (now MTV Classic).

As of November 2023, FXX is available to approximately 58,000,000 pay television households in the United States, down from its 2019 peak of 87,000,000 households.

== History ==
=== Development ===
In January 2013, it was reported by various media outlets that sports-focused channel Fox Soccer would be shut down and be replaced with a general entertainment network that would act as a brother service to FX; while FXX (formerly an initialism for Fox Extended Extra) was a possible name from the start, another name proposed for the new network was FX2. The decision appeared to have been made after Fox Sports' American television rights to English Premier League soccer matches, which it had shared with ESPN, moved to NBC Sports, which acquired the American rights to the league in October 2012, a deal that took effect at the start of the 2013–14 season. Also likely having an effect on Fox Soccer's future was the eventual conversion of two other Fox Sports specialty channels on August 17, 2013, when the motorsports-oriented Speed became the new general-interest Fox Sports 1 and the extreme sports-heavy Fuel TV converted to Fox Sports 2 (Premier League broadcasts on NBC began that same day).

On March 28, 2013, News Corporation's FX Networks outlined plans to launch FXX on September 2 which would replace the Fox Soccer channel. The new network would be available in approximately 74 million American homes. FX President John Landgraf said FXX would complete "a suite of three channels" targeting three different demos: FX would aim for viewers 18–49, FXX would seek viewers 18–34, and its movie network, FXM, would go for viewers 25–54. He would oversee all three channels.

In the months leading up to the launch, Fox was generally concerned about definitively confirming where FXX would be placed on cable/satellite channel lineups, though Fox officials had indicated off the record that the plan was to indeed replace Fox Soccer with the new network.

Fox Soccer's conversion to FXX took place on the morning of September 2, 2013, leading out of a final airing of Fox Soccer's Being: Liverpool with an hour block of paid programming (which featured an FXX disclaimer card at the front) at 6 a.m. (ET), followed by the proper launch an hour later at 7 a.m. (ET).

=== Launch ===
The launch clip had FC Barcelona's Lionel Messi about to score a goal (two scenes taken from the UEFA Champions League matches on April 3, 2012, and March 12, 2013) "broken up" before gradually transitioning to a clip of Frank Reynolds (Danny DeVito) of It's Always Sunny in Philadelphia bursting through a leather couch (representing a television screen being "ripped") being "birthed" in the nude (a scene taken from the 2009 Christmas special episode "A Very Sunny Christmas"), suggesting the "birth" of FXX; this led into the pilot episode of Parks and Recreation, the start of an all-day marathon airing of the series. As a result of the rebranding, Fox Soccer's remaining event rights, including CONCACAF and UEFA matches, have moved to Fox Sports 1, Fox Sports 2, or in some cases, Fox Soccer Plus.

The channel was intended by Fox to be part of the basic cable lineup, but it started on many providers (including Suddenlink Communications, Comcast, DirecTV, Verizon Fios, and Charter Communications) in its previous placement within a specialty sports package (along with the costs which come with those packages), a holdover from the channel's previous iteration as Fox Soccer. The vast majority of providers have since moved it to reasonable basic channel positions over time, often next to FX where possible.

=== 2013–2019: Beginnings ===
In October 2013, oil company ExxonMobil sued Fox for trademark infringement and claimed that FXX's logo infringed the interlocking X of its Exxon fuel brand. The network disputed the company's claim that there was the possibility of confusion, with a spokesperson explaining that "we are confident that viewers won't tune into FXX looking for gas or motor oil and drivers won't pull up to an Exxon pump station expecting to get It's Always Sunny in Philadelphia." ExxonMobil and 21CF dismissed the lawsuit in October 2015.

On November 15, 2013, FXX acquired broadcast syndication rights to the Fox series The Simpsons. Original contracts had previously stated that syndication rights for the series would not be sold to cable until the series' conclusion in deference to the local broadcast stations throughout the United States which had carried the series in syndication since the fall of 1993. However, all parties had not projected the series' longevity, nor of the technological advances since 1993.

The series premiered on the network on August 21, 2014, starting with a twelve-day marathon. This featured the first 552 episodes (every episode that had been released at the time) aired chronologically, including The Simpsons Movie, which FX Networks had already owned the rights to air. The first day of the marathon was the highest rated broadcast day in the history of FXX at that time, the ratings more than tripled those of regular prime time programming for FXX. Ratings during the first six nights of the marathon grew night after night, with FXX ranking within the top 5 networks in basic cable each night. It became the longest continuous marathon in the history of television, until VH1 Classic broke FXX's record with their nineteen-day marathon of Saturday Night Live in February 2015.

A Canadian version of FXX launched on April 1, 2014. The launch was an extension of FX Network's joint venture with Canada's Rogers Sports & Media; a Canadian version of FX previously launched on October 31, 2011. Both networks are jointly owned by the two entities, with FX Networks owing a 33.36% stake in each.

On December 17, 2014, the network announced it would launch a late-night animation block on January 22. The block would feature shows originally developed and produced by Fox's Animation Domination High-Def Studios. Using the Animation Domination branding, the block would launch with eight new episodes of Lucas Bros. Moving Co. and Stone Quackers. The block however, only lasted for several months before being canceled in 2016, along with the above-mentioned series.

In November 2016, around Thanksgiving, FXX launched a 13-day, 600-episode run of The Simpsons in honor of the show's 600th episode. The marathon would include the first four episodes of The Simpsons' 28th season (of which was then-current as the season was still being aired by Fox) and ending with the episode "Treehouse of Horror XXVII".

On July 15, 2017, a 2017 CONCACAF Gold Cup soccer game featuring the U.S. men's national team aired on FXX due to sports programming conflicts with Fox and Fox Sports 1; The Washington Post noted that the match was likely placed on FXX rather than Fox Sports 2 due to its broader carriage, as it is available in nearly as many households as FS1, and on basic tiers on some providers.

=== 2019–2023: Acquisition by Disney and shift towards animation ===
As part of 21st Century Fox's acquisition by The Walt Disney Company, FX Networks was integrated into the newly renamed Walt Disney Television unit on March 20, 2019. On April 8, 2019, FX Networks announced its acquisition of off-network rights to Family Guy, starting with its sixteenth season, and Bob's Burgers, starting with its ninth season. Family Guy began airing on FXX on April 16, while Bob's Burgers made its debut on September 24, 2019. FXX shares the rights to Family Guy with sister networks Freeform and FX, which aired the show until 2024.

Warner Bros. Discovery's Adult Swim and TBS originally held the cable rights to the prior seasons of both shows; their rights to older seasons of Family Guy expired originally on September 18, 2021, leaving TBS permanently, while Adult Swim reacquired the rights of the show and returned on January 1, 2025, with a 3-day marathon, sharing rights with FXX and Paramount Skydance's Comedy Central (who acquired the rights on August 14, 2024, and airing since September 2, 2024 with a fan-favorite episodes marathon), while with Bob's Burgers a similar case happen, with the show left TBS on August 26, 2023, while at the same time with Adult Swim, they made a new deal to share rights in both networks, with earlier seasons premiered on FXX on September 28, 2023, and the later seasons premiered on Adult Swim on October 2, 2023, sharing rights with both networks (but not with TBS).

On August 29, 2019, FXX announced Cake, a half-hour series featuring short-form adult animation and live-action content, would premiere September 25. Cake is the network's first original animated program since the aborted pilot of Cassius and Clay and the discontinuation of their Animation Domination block in 2016.

On September 20, 2021, FXX began airing reruns of fellow 20th Television animated shows King of the Hill and The Cleveland Show, and dramatically overhauled the network lineup to air roughly 14 hours of adult animated series every day, aside from for airings of It's Always Sunny in Philadelphia and Dave (before Dave was cancelled in 2024, and Sunny reruns being reduced and those hours taken by the adult animation shows), with films only airing in the mornings and early afternoon. This later expanded to roughly 16 hours after FXX began airing Futurama on November 15, 2021, having acquired the off-network rights to that series from NBCUniversal's Syfy (who last aired the series on November 10). FX Networks currently shares the rights to Family Guy and Bob's Burgers with Adult Swim, previously King of the Hill and Futurama both shows were shared from November 22, 2021, to November 22, 2025, and December 27, 2021, to December 27, 2025, respectively with Adult Swim, while also sharing Family Guy with Comedy Central, previously The Cleveland Show was shared before left FXX (between September 2021 to September 2024), remaining with sporadically airings on that network, and with Futurama, the show left the lineup of September 19, 2025, after being shared since November 15, 2021 until final airdate on Comedy Central, remaining on FXX in exclusive in the meantime, together with King of the Hill since November 22, 2025, respectively.

FXX ran its first marathon of every Family Guy episode from the first 19 seasons, except "Partial Terms of Endearment", from December 25, 2021, to January 1, 2022, in a similar fashion to their previous multi-day marathons of The Simpsons.

Following the shift in the network lineup, FXX averaged 243,000 viewers in primetime in 2022, up 23% compared to 2021, ranking 53rd among all networks. FXX also went up 23% in the 18-49 demographic, averaging 139,000 and ranking 25th. Both numbers beat that of their closest competitor, Adult Swim.

=== 2023–present: Carriage decline ===
On September 1, 2023, the carriage agreement between Disney and Charter expired due to Charter's request that Disney provide free access to Disney+ and ESPN+ for all of Charter's subscribers. Disney requested that Charter maintain temporary carriage of their networks during the negotiation period, but Charter declined. This resulted in these networks being removed from the service that lasted 11 days, during which 15 million Spectrum television customers were unable to access to Disney's television networks.

On September 11, 2023, Charter and Disney agreed to a renewed carriage agreement, which allowed Spectrum customers to resume watching the Disney content that were originally promised in their subscription package. However, in addition to FXX, BabyTV, Freeform, FXM, Nat Geo Wild, Nat Geo Mundo, Disney Junior, and Disney XD were not restored.

On June 26, 2025, Charter and Disney struck a new deal with Spectrum that they'll be adding Hulu's ad-supported tier and restore 8 networks that were dropped in 2023, which includes FXX and its sister network FXM.

== Programming ==
Much of FXX's original programming has consisted of comedy series that previously aired on Fox's sister networks, such as It's Always Sunny in Philadelphia, Archer, and shows from the Animation Domination High-Def block. Premieres of such programming generally air on Wednesday or Thursday nights in the last hour of network primetime. As of September 2021, FXX's acquired lineup (outside programming shared with FX and FXM) consists of film telecasts in the morning and adult animated series (mainly 20th Television Animation-produced shows) airing in the afternoon and evenings.

=== Programming blocks ===
- Animation Domination – Originally broadcast on Fox as "Animation Domination High-Def", this was a late night adult animation block that hosted short-form series such as Axe Cop, Major Lazer, and Stone Quackers.
- Simpsons Sunday – A Sunday afternoon block that aired episodes of The Simpsons that have a similar theme to the episode that would air later that night on Fox.

=== "Every. Simpsons. Ever." ===
FXX is the cable home of The Simpsons (excluding the Tracey Ullman shorts), of which marathons are aired in primetime. FXX is known for their larger Simpsons marathon events in which the entire run of the series at the time is aired over a number of days.

A third marathon, the "Plus+Size Holiday Marathon," aired from December 17 to 31, 2019, and consisted of 661 episodes, excluding "Stark Raving Dad" and Live action opening, and the syndication premiere of The Longest Daycare animated short. The marathon was a promotional event for Disney+, which would become the exclusive streaming service for the series after the shuttering of FX's Simpsons World hub.
