= FX (TV channel) =

American cable television network

- Country: United States
- Broadcast area: Nationwide
- Headquarters: 10201 West Pico Boulevard; Building 103, 4th Floor; Los Angeles, CA 90035, United States; (until 2026); ABC Building, Burbank, California (2026–present)

Programming
- Language: English
- Picture format: HDTV 720p (downscaled to letterboxed 480i for the SD feed)

Ownership
- Owner: Disney Entertainment (The Walt Disney Company)
- Parent: FX Networks
- Sister channels: List: ABC; ESPN; National Geographic; Nat Geo Wild; Freeform; FXX; FXM

History
- Launched: June 1, 1994; 32 years ago
- Founder: Rupert Murdoch
- Former names: fX (1994–1997)

Links
- Website: fxnetworks.com

Availability

Streaming media
- Affiliated Streaming Service: Disney+ and Hulu
- Streaming services: YouTube TV, Hulu + Live TV, Sling TV, FuboTV, Vidgo, DirecTV Stream

FX (originally/formerly Fox Extended) is an American pay television channel owned by FX Networks, a division of the Disney Entertainment business segment of the Walt Disney Company. Based at the Fox Studios lot in Century City, Los Angeles, FX was originally launched by the first-incarnation News Corporation on June 1, 1994, and later became one of the properties that was included in Disney's acquisition of one of News Corporation's successor companies, 21st Century Fox, in 2019. The channel's original programming aspires to the standards of premium cable channels in regard to mature themes and content, high-quality writing, directing and acting. Sister channels FXM and FXX were launched in 1994 and 2013, respectively. FX also carries reruns of theatrical films and terrestrial-network sitcoms. Advertising-free content was available through the FX+ premium subscription service until it was shut down on August 21, 2019, superseded by the ad-free tier of Hulu.

As of November 2023, FX is available to approximately 71 million pay television households in the United States - down from its 2011 peak of 99 million households. In addition to the flagship American network, the "FX" name is licensed to a number of related pay television channels in various countries around the world.

== History ==
212 5th Avenue, Manhattan, where fX started broadcasting in 1994

=== 1994–1997: "TV Made Fresh Daily" ===
FX, originally stylized as "fX", launched on June 1, 1994. Broadcasting from a large "apartment" in Manhattan's Flatiron District, fX was one of the first forays into large-scale interactive television. The channel centered on original programming, which was broadcast live every day from the "fX Apartment", and rebroadcasts of classic television shows from the 1960s, 1970s and 1980s, such as The Fall Guy, Batman, Wonder Woman, Eight Is Enough, Nanny and the Professor, and The Green Hornet. fX had two taglines during this period: "TV Made Fresh Daily" and "The World's First Living Television Network". The "f" in the channel's name and logo was rendered in lower-case to portray a type of relaxed friendliness; the stylized "X" represented the channel's roots: the crossing searchlights of the 20th Century Fox logo.

The live shows were each mostly focused on one broad topic. Shows included Personal fX (collectibles and antiques), The Pet Department (pets), Under Scrutiny with Jane Wallace (news) and Sound fX (music). The channel's flagship show, Breakfast Time, hosted by Laurie Hibberd and Tom Bergeron and inspired by the British morning show The Big Breakfast, was formatted like an informal magazine show. Breakfast Time and Personal fX would regularly feature the channel's "roving reporters" – which included Suzanne Whang, John Burke and Phil Keoghan – visiting unique places around the United States live via satellite. Other notable fX personalities included Karyn Bryant and Orlando Jones, who were panelists on Sound fX.

The channel prided itself on its interactivity with viewers. fX, in 1994, was an early adopter of the internet, embracing e-mail and the World Wide Web as methods of feedback. Most of the shows would feature instant responses to e-mailed questions, and one show, Backchat (hosted by Jeff Probst), was exclusively devoted to responding to viewer mail, whether sent through e-mail or traditional postal mail. Select viewers were allowed to spend a day at the "apartment" and take part in all of the channel's shows. Inside the channel's syndicated programming blocks, channel hosts would frequently appear during commercial breaks to read news headlines, respond to e-mails from viewers about the episode that was airing, or to promote upcoming programming.

In 1995, Liberty Media purchased a 50% stake in the network as part of their alliance with News Corporation to form Fox Sports Net; as a part of this plan, fX became the national home for Fox Sports programming over the next few years.

The first incarnation of fX was not available on Time Warner Cable, one of the major cable systems in New York City, where its programming originated. TWC would not carry the channel until September 2001.

The live shows gradually disappeared one by one until only Personal fX remained. Breakfast Time was moved to the Fox network and renamed Fox After Breakfast in mid-1996. It underwent several format changes but never found a substantial audience and was canceled less than a year later. By the time that all live programming (with the exception of Personal fX) was dropped, the channel focused entirely on its classic television shows until its relaunch in mid-1997. Personal fX remained on the refocused FX until May 1, 1998. FX vacated the "apartment" in the summer of 1998, and the channel's operations were streamlined with the other Fox-owned subscription channels.

=== 1997–2001: "Fox Gone Cable" ===
In early 1997, fX was relaunched as "FX: Fox Gone Cable", refocusing the channel's target audience towards men aged 18 to 49. During the first few years after its relaunch, FX was known for little else than airing reruns of such Fox shows as The X-Files and Married... with Children, as well as 20th Century Fox-produced shows such as M*A*S*H and Buffy the Vampire Slayer. The channel also added Major League Baseball games to its lineup at that time (at one point sharing rights with then-sister network Fox Family), and eventually expanded its sports programming to include NASCAR races in 2001.

In the summer of 1998, FX debuted three original series: Bobcat's Big Ass Show, Instant Comedy with the Groundlings and Penn & Teller's Sin City Spectacular. All three series were cancelled the following year. Soon after its relaunch, the "Fox Gone Cable" tagline was dropped. By 1999, new original television shows were added with the debut of shows such as Son of the Beach (a Baywatch parody that starred Timothy Stack and was executive produced by Howard Stern) and The X Show (a male-oriented late night panel talk show). The channel also acquired the pay-television syndication rights to reruns of series such as Ally McBeal, NYPD Blue and The Practice for then-record high prices then unseen in the pay-television industry despite all three 20th Century Fox Television series being under common ownership; when these shows expensively fumbled in primetime, FX predominantly ran movies in its more high-profile time periods, though with the move of premiere film rights from free-to-air broadcast networks to basic cable channels, FX unexpectedly would end up a benefactor of this change.

=== 2002–2007: Emergence in original programming ===
Beginning in 2002, FX emerged as a major force in original pay-television programming, gaining both acclaim and notoriety for edgy dramas. That year, FX debuted the police drama The Shield, which became a breakout hit. This trend continued the following year with Nip/Tuck, a drama about two plastic surgeons, and the Denis Leary-helmed Rescue Me, about the lives of a crew of firemen from the New York City Fire Department post-9/11. Both shows were lauded by critics, and achieved equal success with viewers. Rescue Me was one of the few television series to be given an order for an additional season prior to the broadcast of its most recent season: in June 2009 FX renewed the show for an 18-episode sixth season, although the fifth season had not premiered at the time.

Unlike many broadcast networks, FX has chosen to take risks with its programming and push the envelope of what can be shown on television; as a result, most (though not all) of the channel's original series are rated TV-MA, often for strong profanity, sexual content, and/or violence. Family organizations such as the Parents Television Council (PTC) and American Family Association (AFA), have asked advertisers to boycott these shows due to their graphic content. Despite this, FX's original programming output, outside of a few shows, has been critically acclaimed for their strong storylines and characters.

Capitalizing on the success of the hit documentary Super Size Me, filmmaker Morgan Spurlock launched a new series, 30 Days, which debuted on FX in June 2005. The series place its subjects in situations uncomfortable to them for 30 days, such as making millionaires work for minimum wage, and having Christians live in a Muslim community.

In the summer of 2005, FX debuted two new comedy series, Starved, about the daily lives of four friends with eating disorders who live in New York City; and It's Always Sunny in Philadelphia, about the usually very politically incorrect comic misadventures of four people who own a bar in the titular city. Both of these shows feature frank sexual dialogue and strong language, and were pitched as "The Dark Side of Comedy". Starved was derided by groups that sought to publicize eating disorders and was cancelled after its first season due to low ratings. Conversely, Sunny quickly became a critical darling, consistently achieved high viewership, and was picked up for a second season within days of its first-season finale. The second season added veteran actor Danny DeVito to the cast, and the show, still airing as of 2024, is the longest-running live-action sitcom in history.

In 2006, FX debuted two new series, the reality series Black. White. and the drama Thief; neither series was picked up for a second season. During 2007, FX introduced three new dramas: Dirt, starring Courteney Cox; The Riches, starring Eddie Izzard and Minnie Driver; and Damages, starring Glenn Close, Ted Danson and Rose Byrne. All three performed well in the ratings and were renewed for second seasons. By 2008, FX was available in 90.6 million homes in the United States.

=== 2008–2018: Subsequent times ===
FX logo used from 2008 to 2013

In 2008, FX launched a new branding campaign built around the theme "There Is No Box." It alluded to the phrase "thinking outside the box" and referred to how the channel's programming goes beyond "the box" concept. In addition, this was a pun related to FX's creating original shows to compete against premium channels such as HBO. FX's logo was updated on December 18, 2007, retaining only the FX wordmark while removing searchlights placed to its left since the 1997 rebrand. The new branding included an advertising campaign featuring a post-game ad for FX during Fox's coverage of Super Bowl XLII. The promo used the James Morrison song "You Give Me Something".

During 2008, competition with other pay-television channels increased. This was evident in the second season ratings for series Dirt and The Riches, whose ratings decreased significantly from their freshman seasons. During some weeks, viewership for both shows barely exceeded 1 million. Both shows were cancelled in 2008; acquired shows Dharma and Greg, Buffy the Vampire Slayer, Married... with Children and Fear Factor were also removed from the schedule.

On September 3, 2008, FX debuted Sons of Anarchy, a drama series created by Kurt Sutter (who previously served as executive producer of The Shield) about a fictional outlaw motorcycle club devoted to protecting their sheltered California town from corporate developers and drug dealers; its September premiere coincided with that of The Shield's final season. Sons of Anarchy became a critical and commercial success, having aired for seven seasons as of 2014. In 2010, the series attracted an average of 4.9 million viewers per week, making it FX's highest rated series to date. Other new shows that premiered in 2008 included the Kenny Hotz comedy Testees, which debuted in October 2008 and was cancelled after its first season. In August 2008, FX relaunched its website, adding streaming of full episodes of its original shows. In 2009, reruns of the former ABC sitcom Spin City were removed from the schedule (though it was restored early the following year).

In July 2009, FX ordered three new comedy pilots: Archer, an animated series featuring a spy agency, which premiered on January 14, 2010; The League, with a group of friends who are part of a fantasy football league; and Louie, a sitcom starring stand-up comedian and writer Louis C.K., which "blend[s] stand-up material with ... 'extended vignettes' depicting moments from [the comedian's] offstage experiences." The following year, FX debuted Wilfred, a comedy series starring Elijah Wood. It is based on the Australian series Wilfred.

In March 2010, the channel debuted Justified, a drama series created by Graham Yost based on Elmore Leonard's short story "Fire in the Hole" (which was the series' original working title). It starred Timothy Olyphant as U.S. Marshal Raylan Givens – a tough, soft-spoken lawman with a rough side – and chronicles his cases and personal life, including unfinished business with an ex-wife and his aging father. FX also picked up the crime comedy-drama Terriers, created by Ted Griffin, for its fall 2010 lineup; in 2011, the channel debuted the boxing drama Lights Out, about retired boxing champion Patrick "Lights" Leary who is considering a comeback, despite the serious risks it entails. Despite the critical acclaim that Terriers and Lights Out received, the two series were cancelled after their first seasons due to low viewership; For Terriers specifically, FX Networks president and General Manager John Landgraf would later admit in a 2016 interview with critic Alan Sepinwall that "I cannot think of a more painful moment of my career than the one when I defined Terriers as a failure by canceling it."

On October 1, 2010, parent company News Corporation (which spun off FX and the company's other American-based entertainment properties to 21st Century Fox in July 2013) pulled its channels from Dish Network due to a carriage dispute over retransmission consent revenue. FX returned to the satellite provider's channel lineup on October 29, 2010, after Dish Network and News Corporation signed a long-term carriage agreement. On November 1, 2010, following a similar dispute, FX and its sister channels were restored by New York City-based cable provider Cablevision through a separate carriage agreement.

On October 14, 2011, FX announced it picked up the rights to develop a series based on Scar Tissue and Lords of the Sunset Strip, the autobiographies of the Red Hot Chili Peppers singer Anthony Kiedis and his father, Blackie Dammett. HBO had picked up the series, which was to be titled Spider & Son, a few years before but never completed the project. Entourage writer/producers Marc Abrams and Mike Benson were tapped as its showrunners and Kiedis was to be involved as a co-producer. Dammett said in 2013 that the show has been "mothballed", and he hopes interest will resume on the project once the Red Hot Chili Peppers wrapped up their world tour that year. As of 2014 there has been no mention from FX, Kiedis or Dammett on the status of the series. On January 30, 2013, FX premiered the 1980s-set Cold War drama The Americans.

In 2013, FX underwent a rebranding to accompany its new comedy-focused spin-off channel FXX, including the new slogan "Fearless"; Landgraf explained that the slogan symbolized that viewers of its programming "don't know what's going to happen and that you're not in a safe place that is governed by guardrails that are going to keep you from going off."

=== 2019–present: Disney subsidiary ===
On March 20, 2019, the Walt Disney Company acquired 21st Century Fox. Consequently, FX Networks was integrated into the newly renamed Walt Disney Television unit. In a September 2018 interview with Variety of the Disney-Fox deal, Landgraf said, "I think this is a necessary step. I have curiosity and a bit of anxiety about how it will work, but I'm really excited about it.

On April 8, 2019, FX Networks had acquired off-network rights to Family Guy, starting with its sixteenth season and Bob's Burgers, starting with its ninth season. Family Guy began airing on FXX on April 16, 2019, while Bob's Burgers made its debut on September 24, 2019. FXX shares the rights to Family Guy with sister network Freeform. WarnerMedia's Adult Swim and TBS held the rights to older seasons of both shows; WarnerMedia's rights to Family Guy expired on September 18, 2021, at which point reruns are exclusive to FX Networks and Freeform, with the rights to Bob's Burgers similarly coming under FX Networks' full control in 2023.

On May 14, 2019, Comcast relinquished its control in Hulu to Disney effective immediately. As a result, the streaming service became a division of Walt Disney Direct-to-Consumer & International with Comcast effectively becoming a silent partner. In November 2019, it was announced that FX would produce series for Hulu under the "FX on Hulu" brand. Four series previously in development for the linear FX channel would now premiere on Hulu, including Devs, Mrs. America and A Teacher. Furthermore, episodes aired on the linear FX cable network will be available on Hulu the next day.

On June 11, 2019, Hulu and FX picked up show rights to Lionsgate films released in 2020 and 2021.

In December 2021, Disney renamed the "FX on Hulu" hub to simply "FX" as part of an effort to streamline and extend the brand's use. In addition, Disney began to increase the prominence of FX as an imprint on its original programming, especially when carried on Disney's international streaming platforms such as Disney+ (Star) and Star+.

In 2024, FX won its first Emmy Award for Best Drama for Shōgun, which received a record total of 18 Emmy wins.

== Programming ==
FX's most popular original shows include Justified, Damages, Nip/Tuck, Rescue Me, It's Always Sunny in Philadelphia, The League, Sons of Anarchy, The Shield, The Strain, Archer, American Horror Story, Anger Management, The Americans, Better Things, Louie, You're the Worst, Fargo, American Crime Story, Legion, Snowfall and Atlanta.

The channel also broadcasts theatrically released feature films from sister companies Walt Disney Pictures, Marvel Studios, and 20th Century Studios as well as other film studios such as Columbia Pictures, Sony Pictures Animation, Universal Pictures, Paramount Pictures, Lionsgate Films, Relativity Media, Village Roadshow Pictures, Warner Bros. Pictures, DreamWorks Pictures, and DreamWorks Animation which take up much of FX's primetime and the majority of its weekend schedules. It airs repeats of network television sitcoms (such as Two and a Half Men and How I Met Your Mother). From the late 1990s to the mid-2000s, the acquired shows which FX broadcast consisted largely of series originally broadcast on Fox between the late 1980s and the 2000s (such as That '70s Show, Married... with Children, and In Living Color).

=== Sports programming ===
FX has served as a supplemental sports outlet for its sister networks, first broadcasting Fox Sports-produced programming under News Corporation's and 21st Century Fox's ownership, and ESPN-produced programming since the Disney acquisition of FX.

After obtaining the spring broadcast rights to NASCAR, Fox Sports announced that FX would serve as its cable partner for the 2001 inaugural season of race telecasts. As a result, FX covered several races in the series then known as the Busch Series and Winston Cup (including the All-Star Race), as well as select qualifying and final practice sessions. Having FX carry the race telecasts was intended to promote the channel and encourage NASCAR fans to contact their subscription providers to add FX to their lineup. In 2002, Peter Liguori, who was then president of FX, praised NASCAR for its growth; FX increased penetration from 58.5 million to 76.6 million households nationwide. FX was removed from Fox's NASCAR coverage in the 2007 season, which saw the Busch Series move exclusively to ESPN, and Fox aired all of Nextel Cup races on broadcast television.

In 1997, FX obtained partial cable rights to Major League Baseball games; FX initially aired game telecasts on Monday nights, before moving them to Saturday nights in 1998. In 2000, FX began sharing the cable rights with then-sister network Fox Family Channel (taking rights to the league's Thursday evening games from Fox Sports Net), with games being scheduled on an alternating basis with FX. Starting with the 2001 season, FX also obtained rights to games from the MLB Division Series, the only playoff round to which Fox did not hold television rights. Among the games televised on FX was Cal Ripken Jr.'s final home game with the Baltimore Orioles in September 2001.

On April 27, 2011, FX began airing soccer games from the UEFA Champions League as part of the league's overall television deal with Fox Sports. In the fall of 2011, FX began broadcasting Big 12, Conference USA and Pac-12 college football games on Saturdays (mainly primetime games, with some daytime games mixed in), as part of Fox Sports' broadcasting contracts with the three conferences.

With the August 2013 launches of national sports networks Fox Sports 1 and Fox Sports 2, FX no longer served as a regular cable outlet for Fox Sports, but it still occasionally aired sporting events in the event of overflow situations, such as the UFC 185 preliminary card, and selected soccer matches.

On September 7, 2019, FX would air the preliminary card for UFC 242. The event was being held in Abu Dhabi, which created conflicts with Saturday afternoon college football games on ESPN and ESPN2; it marked the first ESPN-produced sporting event to air on FX since the Disney acquisition of FX. For similar reasons, FX also aired the preliminary card for UFC 309 on Saturday, November 16, 2024. ESPN called UFC 309 airing on FX "a success" and announced that the subsequent UFC event, UFC 310, would have its preliminary card simulcast on ESPN2 and FX. In 2025, UFC 311, UFC 320, UFC 321, UFC 322, and UFC 323, would also air on FX. With ESPN losing the rights to the UFC to CBS Sports after 2025, no more UFC events will air on FX.

On May 17, 2022, Disney announced that it had acquired the exclusive broadcast rights to the XFL beginning with its 2023 season, with games airing on FX, ESPN, and ABC; FX was included in the package to accommodate ESPN and ABC's existing programming commitments. With its first XFL broadcast in February 2023, FX introduced an "ESPN on FX" brand for sports broadcasts carried by FX, modelled after the existing ESPN on ABC branding. ESPN discontinued the broadcasts on FX by late March once the main network's extensive commitments to college basketball were completed. When the XFL merged with United States Football League (USFL) to form the United Football League (UFL), Fox Sports absorbed half of the merged league's broadcast inventory (an agreement nearly identical to the XFL's in 2020), and the schedule moved out of the college basketball season, eliminating the need to use FX as an additional outlet.

== Network slogans ==
- "The World's First Living Television Network" (primary; 1994–1996)
- "TV Made Fresh Daily" (secondary; 1994–1996)
- "TV with You in Mind" (1996–1997)
- "Fox Gone Cable" (1997–1999)
- "Please Watch Responsibly" (1999–2001)
- "Are You Xperienced?" (2001–2008)
- "There Is No Box" (2008–2013)
- "FX Has the Movies" (alternate slogan, 2008–present)
- "Fearless" (2013–present)

== High definition ==
FX began broadcasting a 720p HD channel in 2007, which is available on the majority of pay television providers. The SD channel, as was standard with all of Fox's broadcast and pay-TV networks (and also its new Disney siblings, which also all operate in 720p), is now merely downscaled from the HD feed at the provider headend level rather than having a devoted SD feed.

FX's programming on Hulu is streamed at a higher bitrate and resolution, with its FX on Hulu-era shows produced and aired in up to 4k resolution.

== International distribution ==
Since 2004, Fox overseen the expansion of FX's to international markets, as well as forming several distribution partnerships to syndicate FX programs to other broadcast networks, cable channels, and video services on request outside the United States.

In March 2019, Disney acquired 21st Century Fox, after the acquisition Disney would expand the network more by rebranding several Fox networks in the Baltic states, CIS, Greece and Poland as FX, as result of the acquisition.

FX programs in Canada are also distributed through agreement with Rogers Sports & Media.

== See also ==
- FX Networks
- FXX
- FX Movie Channel
- FX on Hulu
- FX Productions
