= Masters of Russian Animation =

Russian four-DVD animation collection

Masters of Russian Animation is a Russian four-DVD animation collection that contains 45 short animations and stop-motion animations. Animated in the Soviet Union and later released in 2000, the cartoons contain different styles in animation and painting. The animations were released from different years, beginning with the oldest, Story of One Crime (1962), to the more recent, Croak X Croak (1991).

== Content ==
=== Volume 1 (1962–1968) ===

- Story of One Crime
- Man in the Frame
- My Green Crocodile
- There Lived Kozyavin
- Mountain of Dinosaurs
- Passion of Spies
- The Glass Harmonica
- Ball of Wool
- Singing Teacher
- Film, Film, Film

=== Volume 2 (1969–1978) ===

- Ballerina on the Boat
- Seasons
- Armoire
- The Battle of Kerzhenets
- Butterfly
- Island
- Fox and Rabbit
- The Heron and the Crane
- Hedgehog in the Fog
- Crane's Feathers
- Firing Range
- Contact

=== Volume 3 (1979–1985) ===

- Tale of Tales
- Hunt
- Last Hunt
- There Once Was a Dog
- Travels of an Ant
- Cabaret
- Lion and Ox
- Wolf and Calf
- Old Stair
- King's Sandwich
- About Sidorov Vova

=== Volume 4 (1986–1991) ===

- Door
- Boy is a Boy
- Liberated Don Quixote
- Martinko
- Big Underground Ball
- Cat and Clown
- Dream
- Cat and Company
- Kele
- Alters Ego
- Girlfriend
- Croak X Croak

== See also ==
- History of Russian animation
- Soyuzmultfilm
