= History of Russian animation =

The history of Russian animation is the visual art form produced by Russian animation makers. As most of Russia's production of animation for cinema and television were created during Soviet times, it may also be referred to some extent as the history of Soviet animation. It remains a nearly unexplored field in film theory and history outside Russia.

== Beginnings ==
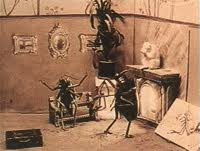
Scene from Ladislas Starevich's The Cameraman's Revenge (1911).

The first Russian animator was Alexander Shiryaev, a principal ballet dancer and choreographer at the Mariinsky Theatre who made a number of pioneering stop motion and traditionally animated films between 1906 and 1909. He built an improvised studio at his apartment where he carefully recreated various ballets — first by making thousands of sketches and then by staging them using hand-made puppets; he shot them using the 17.5 mm Biokam camera, frame by frame. Shiryaev did not hold much interest in animation as an art form, but rather saw it as an instrument in studying human plastics. They were mostly forgotten during the Soviet period, mentioned only in the memoirs of his students. In 1995, they were re-discovered by a ballet historian Viktor Bocharov who got hold of Shiryayev's archives and released A Belated Premiere documentary in 2003 with fragments of various films. All of them were later restored and digitized with the help from the Pordenone Silent Film Festival and Aardman Animations.

The second person to independently discover animation was Vladislav Starevich. Being a trained biologist, he started to make animation with embalmed insects for educational purposes, but soon realized the possibilities of this medium to become one of the undisputed masters of stop motion later in his life. His first few films, made in 1910, were dark comedies on the family lives of cockroaches, and were so revolutionary that they earned him a decoration from Nicholas II of Russia. He produced a number of other popular animated films with insects at the Aleksandr Khanzhonkov's studio where he also worked as a cinematographer and a director of live-action films, sometimes combining live action with stop motion animation, as in The Night Before Christmas and A Terrible Vengeance (both from 1913). Starevich left Russia after the October Revolution, and for many years, the animation industry was paralyzed.

== After the revolution ==
Interplanetary Revolution (1924).

In the early years after the October Revolution, Russian animation remained undeveloped compared to cinema or theatre. The 1923 agitprop animated short Today directed by Dziga Vertov and animated by Ivan Belyaev became a pioneering work and was followed by other cutout films (called flat marionettes at the time) in style of editorial cartoons that satirized bourgeoisie, Church and Western countries, drawn and animated in a sketchy manner; those included films and sketches by Vetrov and Aleksandr Bushkin for Sovkino such as Soviet Toys, Humoresques and episodes of Kino-Pravda.

In 1924, Mezhrabpom-Rus released the critically acclaimed Interplanetary Revolution that satirized Aelita. It also utilized cutout animation along with the constructivism art style and was developed independently by three artists — Nikolai Khodataev, Zenon Komissarenko and Yuri Merkulov — who headed the first Soviet animation studio at the All-Union Technicum of Cinematography. In 1925, it was followed by a government-backed China in Flames made by the same team along with Ivan Ivanov-Vano, Vladimir Suteev and the Brumberg sisters. With 1000 meters of film and 14 frames per second it ran over 50 minutes at the time, which made it the first Soviet animated feature film and one of the first in the world.

During the late 1920s, the industry started moving away from agitation. In 1927, Merkulov, Ivanov-Vano and Daniil Cherkes directed the first Soviet cartoon aimed at children — Senka the African based on the fairy tale in verse by Korney Chukovsky. Made at Mezhrabpom-Rus, it combined traditional animation and some live action scenes. Same year Ivanov-Vano and Cherkes worked on The Skating Rink, another hand-drawn short that featured a distinguishable art style (white lines against black background). It was written and directed by Yuri Zhelyabuzhsky and Nikolai Bartram, founder of the Moscow Toy Museum, who also produced Bolvashka's Adventures that combined live action and stop motion animation in a story about a Pinocchio-like wooden boy. The idea was extended in a spiritual successor — Bratishkin's Adventures, the first Soviet animated series created between 1928 and 1931 by Yuri Merkulov and Aleksandr Ptushko at Mosfilm.

A scene from Dzhyabzha (1938).

In 1928, Nikolai Khodataev, his sister Olga Khodataeva and the Brumberg sisters produced a hand-drawn animated short The Samoyed Boy stylized as traditional Nenets art that followed a dramatic narrative and used an innovative technique of printing on thin celluloid. A 24-minute stop motion film The Adventures of the Little Chinese was directed same year by Maria Benderskaya and could be considered a return to the traditions of Ladislas Starevich.

Mikhail Tsekhanovsky's Post (1929, cutout/cel animation) was both a return to constructivism traditions and a big step forward: it was successfully exported and widely shown around the world, while in the USSR it changed the perception of animation as an art form. It also became the first colorized Soviet animated film and one of the first to get a musical score and a voiceover by Daniil Kharms. Mikhail and his wife Vera Tsekhanovskaya led an animation studio at Lenfilm where a number of distinctive hand-drawn and stop motion films were created throughout the 1930s, including the much-praised Dzhyabzha (1938) by Mstislav Pashchenko. The team actively applied color using the original dye-transfer process invented by Lenfilm specialists, similar to Technicolor.

The Bazaar scene from The Tale of the Priest and of His Workman Balda.

In 1933, the couple collaborated with Dmitri Shostakovich and Alexander Vvedensky on the first traditionally animated Soviet feature — The Tale of the Priest and of His Workman Balda, a satirical opera loosely based on the fairy tale in verse by Alexander Pushkin and stylized as ROSTA posters. Despite many problems, including the infamous bullying of Shostakovich in press, the film was nearly finished and had been stored at Lenfilm until 1941 when almost all of it was destroyed in fire caused by the bombings of Leningrad. Tsekhanovsky is also credited with invention of graphical sound along with Arseny Avraamov and Evgeny Sholpo. They were challenged by a group led by Aleksandr Ivanov who made a number of animated shorts based on their own idea of "drawing paper sound".

In 1935, Aleksandr Ptushko directed The New Gulliver, one of the world's first full-length animated movies that combined detailed stop motion with a live actor (a 15-year-old boy). The film featured from 1,500 to 3,000 different puppets with detachable heads and various facial expressions, as well as camera and technical tricks.

The Tale of the Fisherman and the Fish (1937) by Aleksandr Ptushko.

The international success of the movie allowed Ptushko to open his own "division of 3D animation" at Mosfilm which also worked as a school for beginning animators. In four years, they created a dozen of stop motion shorts; most of them, such as A Fox and a Wolf (1936), were based around Russian folklore, traditional art (with the involvement of artists from Palekh) and could be watched in full color thanks to the newly invented three-color film process by Pavel Mershin. In 1939, Ptushko directed another feature — The Golden Key based on the popular Soviet fairy tale; it also combined stop motion with live action, but to a lesser extent.

Simultaneously, Alexandre Alexeieff who fled for France during the Russian Civil War developed a pinscreen animation technology along with his wife, Claire Parker that allowed for a wide spectre of special effects achieved through the use of hundreds of thousands of pins that formed different patterns. Despite the status of white émigré in the USSR his films were well known among Russian professionals and inspired various artists, most famously Yuri Norstein. In the mid-1990s Alexeieff's daughter visited Moscow and presented her father's works to the State Central Museum of Cinema. Today he is commemorated as a patriarch of Russian animation.

== Soyuzmultfilm, 1936–1960 ==
In September 1933, the Principal Management of the Photo-Cinematographic Industry (GUKF) ordered to provide animators with facilities and equipment; meanwhile, specialized script-writers were hired for Animated feature films. Viktor Smirnov who headed the Amkino Corporation, a New York-based company responsible for distribution of Soviet movies in North America, was given the task to study the animation processes at Disney and Fleischer Studios. Next year Smirnov returned to Moscow and founded an Experimental Animation Workshop under the Main Directorate of the Photo-Cinematographic Industry where he, Alexei Radakov, Vladimir Suteev and Pyotr Nosov started "developing the Disney style". In 1935, Walt Disney himself sent a film reel with Three Little Pigs and Mickey Mouse shorts to the Moscow International Film Festival that made a lasting impression on Soviet animators and officials.

Why Is Rhino's Skin Wrinkly? by Vladimir Suteev (1938).

On June 10, 1936, the Soyuzdetmultfilm Studio was created in Moscow from the small and relatively independent trickfilm units of Mosfilm, Sovkino, Mezhrabpomfilm and Smirnov's studio. In a year it was renamed to Soyuzmultfilm. Three-months retraining courses were organized by the studio administration where animators studied everything, from drawing and directing movies to the basics of music and acting. For four years some of the leading animators focused on the creation of Disney-style shorts, exclusively using the cel technique. From 1937, on they also produced films in full color using the three-color film process by Pavel Mershin.

Scene from Grandfather Ivan (1939).

In 1938, the team also mastered rotoscoping, or Eclair as it has been known in Russia since the 1920s (after the Eclair video projector). Not everyone was happy with the chosen direction though, and by 1939 many developed their own styles. Ivan Ivanov-Vano directed Moydodyr based on the fairy tale in verse which he personally praised as an important step from Disney. Suteev and Lamis Bredis presented a distinctive Uncle Styopa adaptation, while Leonid Amalrik and Vladimir Polkovnikov converted Doctor Aybolit stories into a distinctive mini-series that ran from 1939 to 1946 and defined the "Soviet style" of animation. At the same time Aleksandr Ivanov and Dmitry Babichenko made a radical shift towards agitprop and socialist realism with films such as Grandfather Ivan and War Chronicles.

Soon after Lev Kuleshov, then a professor at VGIK, suggested Ivanov-Vano to open and head a workshop under the Art Faculty which became the first official Russian workshop where students studied the art of animation. Among Ivanov's first students were Lev Milchin, Yevgeniy Migunov and Anatoly Sazonov.

Kino-Circus by Leonid Amalrik and Olga Khodataeva (1942).

With the start of World War II the studio was evacuated to Samarkand along with some key animators who continued teaching students and producing films, including anti-fascist propaganda. In 1943, they returned to Moscow and released several kids movies such as The Tale of Tsar Saltan (1943) by the Brumberg sisters and The Winter's Tale (1945) by Ivanov-Vano — the last film to use the Soviet three-color filming process before the switch to Agfacolor. By that time Ptushko's studio at Mosfilm had been shut down and Tsekhanovsky's studio at Lenfilm — destroyed by a bomb, which basically turned Soyuzmultfilm into Russia's animation monopoly.

Yet even after the war, its resources were very limited. 19 animators from the relatively small Soyuzmultfilm team were killed in action. A whole generation of Leningrad animators either disappeared at fronts or died during the Siege of Leningrad. Others returned as war-disabled, like Boris Dyozhkin and Aleksandr Vinokurov (both lost their left eyes), Boris Butakov who got a bullet stuck in his head and Vladimir Degtyaryov who lost his right arm and learned to work as left-handed. One of the leading directors, Vladimir Suteev, left the industry on his return for personal reasons.

The dance of the firebirds from The Humpbacked Horse (1947).

The rest worked intensively to prepare new animators; between 1945 and 1948, four groups of students graduated from VGIK. They also continued releasing short and feature films that brought them international recognition, such as The Lost Letter (1945) and The Humpbacked Horse (1947) that was used by Walt Disney as a teaching tool for his artists. In 1948, The Champion short comedy film was accused of "formalism" and "anthropomorphism" following the Cold War anti-Disney campaign. As the art director Yevgeniy Migunov remembered, he floutingly drew backgrounds for his next movie as realistic as possible, and suddenly it became "a golden standard" for the next ten years. Ironically, he would become one of the leading innovators later on.

From 1950 to 1960, the vast majority of animated films were fairy tale adaptations influenced by the works of Viktor Vasnetsov, Ivan Bilibin, Mikhail Vrubel, Palekh and Fedoskino miniatures and other national styles. The Disney's conveyor method of production with a clear work split was implemented along with a full analog of a multiplane camera. Eclair (rotoscoping) also rose to popularity. According to the 1951 report by Ivan Ivanov-Vano, it was a temporary measure that served as a teaching tool for beginning animators. Many leading actors were involved, such as Mikhail Astangov who appeared as the beast in The Scarlet Flower (1952).

Some directors made extensive use of this method, while others mixed it with traditional animation as in The Snow Queen (1957) by Lev Atamanov, arguably the most famous work of that time. Many focused on animal art with little to no use of rotoscoping. All this allowed for a yearly release of prominent feature films with high production values such as The Night Before Christmas (1951), The Snow Maiden (1952), The Enchanted Boy and The Frog Princess (1954), The Twelve Months (1956) and The Adventures of Buratino (1959).

== The Khrushchev Thaw ==
The first changes happened in 1953 when a puppet division was reopened at Soyuzmultfilm. In 1954, Yevgeniy Migunov along with an engineer Semyon Etlis produced the first Soviet stop motion film since Aleksandr Ptushko: Karandash and Klyaksa — Merry Hunters about the adventures of the Russian clown Karandash and his dog. According to Migunov, they had to reinvent the whole production process. They organized a technical base, constructed and patented a device for shooting in statics, with a horizontally moving camera and attachable dolls. Also for the first time they used ball-jointed dolls and latex to make puppet faces.

They were followed by Vladimir Degtyaryov who produced many films such as Beloved Beauty (1958) and Who Said Meow? (1962), Roman Kachanov and Anatoly Karanovich who directed the award-winning The Cloud in Love (1959) that combined stop motion, traditional and cutout animation, Vadim Kurchevsky and Nikolay Serebryakov whose style was marked by extensive aesthetic search for "combination of realism and the baroque". Sergey Obraztsov and his team also produced a number of movies using hand puppets.

The Story of a Crime (1962).

In 1957, Migunov directed Familiar Pictures based on the sketches by a stand-up comedian Arkady Raikin who also appeared in the short. What made it special was a radical style of magazine caricatures, since Raikin's satire did not fit the "realistic" art direction. It was not long until other animators started abandoning it. In 1958, Alexandra Snezhko-Blotskaya released an adaptation of Arkady Gaidar's A Tale of Malchish-Kibalchish inspired by ROSTA posters, while Boris Stepantsev and Evgeny Raykovsky directed a postmodern Petya and the Little Red Riding Hood that leant towards Tex Avery.

In 1960–1962, a whole line of "formalistic" features hit the screens, such as It Was I Who Drew the Little Man by the Brumberg sisters, The Key by Lev Atamanov, Cipollino by Boris Dyozhkin and The Wild Swans by Mikhail and Vera Tsekhanovsky — the first Soviet widescreen feature that introduced Gothic art style. Ivanov-Vano also broke new grounds with The Flying Proletary (1962), the first widescreen stop motion short based on the poems and art of Vladimir Mayakovsky that made use of bas-relief paper dolls. Same year Fyodor Khitruk made a directoral debut with a primitivistic cutout short The Story of a Crime that told a contemporary story and gained international praise.

== Soyuzmultfilm, 1964–1991 ==
In the following years, many animators turned away from the conveyor method of production and developed their own distinctive styles and approaches. The number of titles rose through the mid-1960 into the 1970s and 1980s, up to fifty per year. Mini-series and anthologies became common, while the amount of feature films decreased dramatically.

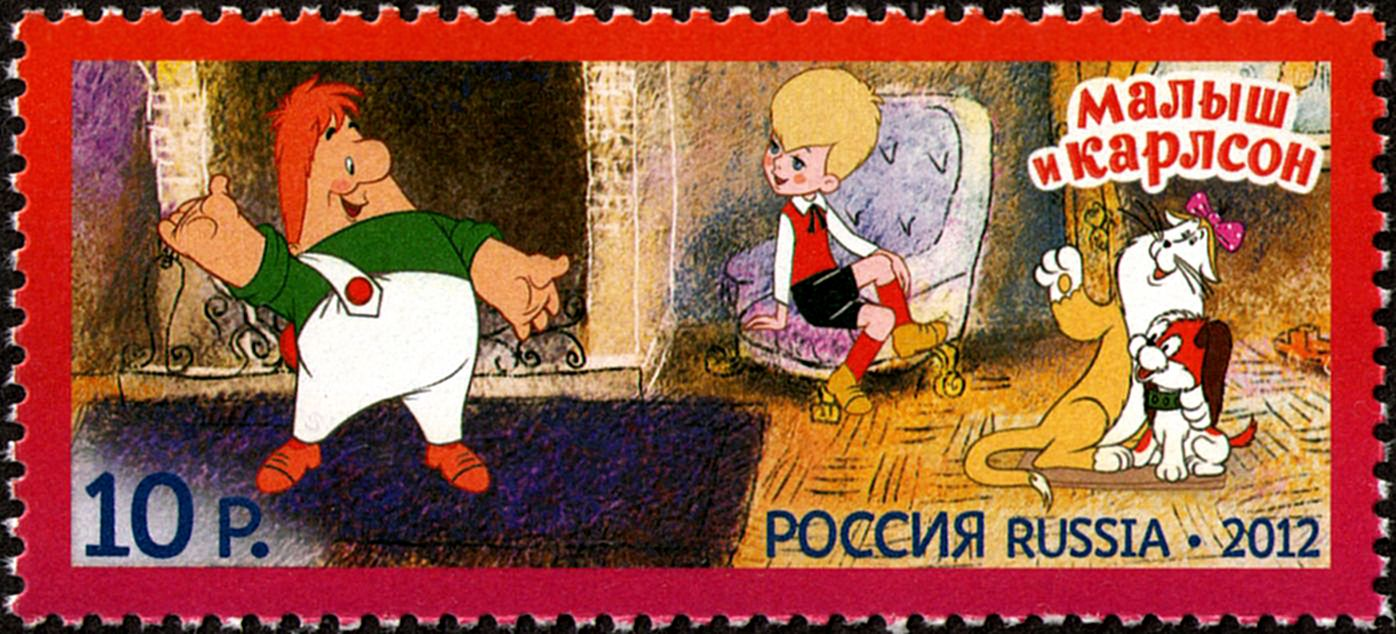
Junior and Karlson stamp based on the animated dilogy.

Director Boris Stepantsev was known for experimenting a lot. Among his films was another postmodern comedy Vovka in the Far Far Away Kingdom (1965), the paint-on-glass animation Song of a Falcon (1967), the highly popular Karlsson-on-the-Roof dilogy (1968–1970) that made use of xerography and The Nutcracker adaptation (1973) that presented a familiar story without a single spoken word.

Some patriarchs also joined the new wave. Ivanov-Vano was appointed an artistic director of the puppet division where he made a number of stop motion/cutout films inspired by Russian folk art, like Lefty (1964) that addressed lubok, Go There, Don't Know Where (1966) that used elements of rayok and skomorokh theatre, The Seasons (1969) based around Tchaikovsky's two character pieces, presented as a combination of Dymkovo toys and lace, and the award-winning The Battle of Kerzhenets (1971) where frescos and icons came to life.

Another well-respected old-timer Boris Dyozhkin launched a popular series of short comedy films about two teams that competed in various sport disciplines such as football, hockey, skiing, boxing and so on. It ran from 1963 to 1981 and was notable for fast-paced slapstick synchronized with music.

Among the most political animators were Fyodor Khitruk whose satire The Man in the Frame (1966) was cut by censors and Andrei Khrzhanovsky whose surrealist film The Glass Harmonica (1968) was shelved for many years. On the other hand, Khitruk's Boniface's Vacation (1965), Film, Film, Film (1968) and the Winnie-the-Pooh trilogy in particular became an instant success among both kids and adults.

Roman Kachanov made numerous films for children. He started with puppet animation such as A Little Frog is Looking for his Father, The Mitten and, most famously, the Cheburashka series that turned Cheburashka into one of the iconic characters of Soyuzmultfilm. In his late years he switched to traditional animation with the feature science fiction film The Mystery of the Third Planet (1981).

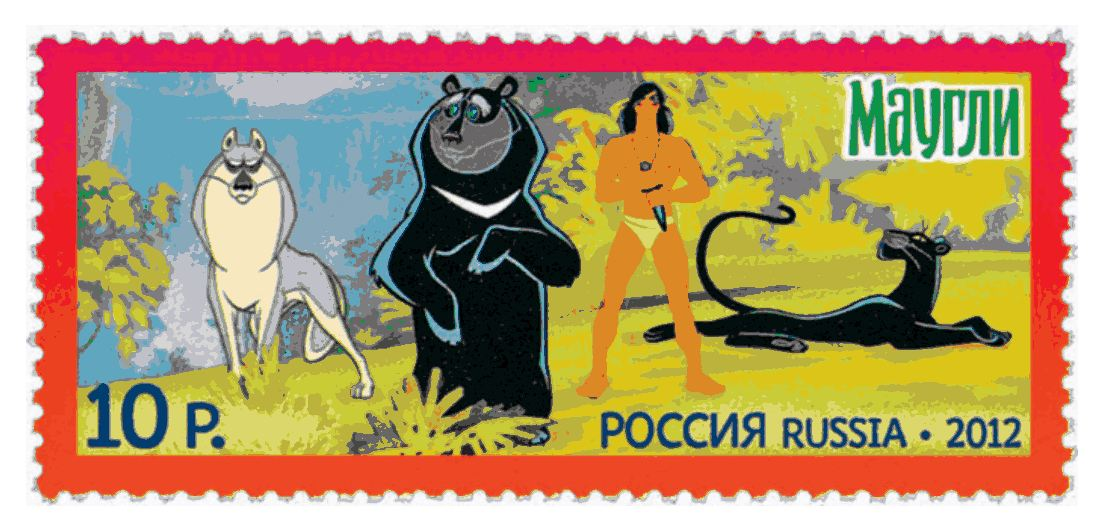
Adventures of Mowgli on a Russian stamp.

Adventures of Mowgli mini-series by Roman Davydov was released from 1967 to 1971. Just like Winnie-the-Pooh, it was not conceived as a reaction to the Disney's The Jungle Book (even the first episode was developed simultaneously) and followed the original plot closely, appearing more adult and spiritually closer to the book. In 1973, the shorts were combined into a 96-minute feature.

The rising popularity of the industry started drawing people from other areas. Vasily Livanov, originally an actor, finished animation courses and directed several experimental pictures. Yet his biggest success was The Bremen Town Musicians (1969), an animated musical film heavily influenced by rock and roll and hippie cultures. The first part was directed by Inessa Kovalevskaya who also abandoned her position at Goskino to work on animated musicals. After she left the project, Livanov directed the sequel by himself. The three main characters were voiced by the leading Soviet pop singer Muslim Magomayev.

Well, Just You Wait! by Vyacheslav Kotyonochkin (1969–1993).

1969 saw the birth of Russia's most popular animation series Well, Just You Wait! directed by Vyacheslav Kotyonochkin. These seemingly simple miniatures about a wolf chasing a hare through Soviet-style cartoon worlds owe a great deal of their popularity to the quality animation, varied soundtrack and cunning subtexts built into their parts. The original series ran from 1969 to 1993. During the mid-2000s, an unsuccessful attempt to reboot the series was made. Another attempt would be made in 2020, releasing in 2021 after delays, though to mass negative reviews. The series uses 3D instead of the traditional 2D animation that was associated with the beloved series. The new version of the cartoon was also modernized for younger audiences, no doubt alienating its previous fans who grew up watching the antics of the wolf and hare.

Also, in 1969, a long-running animated anthology series Happy Merry-Go-Round was founded by Anatoly Petrov and Galina Barinova. Each episode combined several short experimental films by the beginning directors like Leonid Nosyrev, Valery Ugarov, Eduard Nazarov, Gennady Sokolsky, Garri Bardin and Aleksandr Davydov.

Most of them gained acclaim later on, working in their own unique niches. Anatoly Petrov showed extreme realism (close to photorealism) without rotoscopy, photography or any "cheating". His style was known as "photographics", or "graphical painting"; for many years he developed the so-called effect of moving glaze in a 3D environment using traditional animation materials. The final result was close to advanced CGI long before it was invented. Among his best works was Polygon (1977) and several films based on Greek mythology.

Gennady Sokolsky focused on environmental films with attractive characters and ambient soundtracks: Silver Hoof (1977), Pik the Mouse (1978) and The Adventures of Lolo the Penguin (1986), a joined Soviet-Japanese feature co-directed with Kenji Yoshida. Leonid Nosyrev explored the Russian North folklore with a number of ethnographical films based on the stories by Boris Shergin, Stepan Pisakhov and Yuri Koval. In 1987, seven of them were combined into a Laughter and Grief by the White Sea feature film.

One of the most famous Russian animators is Yuri Norstein. His films Hedgehog in the Fog (1975) and Tale of Tales (1979) won numerous awards at international festivals. Tale of Tales was named the best animation film of all time at the 1984 Olympic Arts Festival in Los Angeles and at the 2002 Animafest Zagreb. Since the beginning of perestroika Norstein has been working on The Overcoat.

Vladimir Popov had been known since the 1960s for his shorts such as Umka, but it was the Three from Prostokvashino trilogy (1978–1984) that brought him fame. The characters and their catchphrases entered Russian folklore, and it was chosen the third best animation of all time in the 2014 poll conducted by the Public Opinion Foundation. In 2018 the series was rebooted.

Vladimir Tarasov was a rare Soviet director who dedicated himself to the science fiction genre. Among his prominent works were Contact (1978) influenced by Yellow Submarine, Shooting Range (1979), Contract (1985) and The Pass (1988).

Stanislav Sokolov brought stop motion to a new height. His approach, characterized by complex animation structures and multiple special effects, could be observed in the award-winning Black and White Film (1984) or The Big Underground Ball (1987). During late years, few animated films were produced due to the lack of financing from the government. Garri Bardin who also specialized on stop motion films made of matches, ropes and wire, was one of those few directors who managed to cope with the political changes. His Grey Wolf & Little Red Riding Hood (1991) was full of allusions to the upcoming end of the USSR.

== Other Soviet studios ==
Kievnauchfilm was founded in 1941. Although it was created to produce popular science films, it eventually became best known for its animated films, and remained active in Ukrainian animation for decades.

In 1968, a group of mathematicians led by Nikolay Konstantinov released a 1.5-minute non-narrative animation Kitty, one of the earliest examples of computer and procedural animation in history programmed on BESM-4. The cat's movements and mimics were modelled using the second-order differential equation system. It was also one of the first attempts to render realistic animal motion digitally. Programmed at the Moscow State Pedagogical University, Kitty was made into a movie and screened at the Moscow State University. It was later shown to students at mathematics competitions and used for educational purposes at schools.

From 1970 on, new studios appeared across the RSFSR, most famously Multtelefilm division of Studio Ekran (Moscow) that focused on lower-budget television animation. It was known for several popular TV series such as Leopold the Cat (1975–1987), Kuzya the Little Domovoi (1984–1987), Investigation Held by Kolobki (1986–1987) and Adventures of Funtik the Piglet (1986–1988), as well as various experiments. Vladimir Samsonov re-discovered paint-on-glass animation with films like Wonders (1980), The Huge Sky (1982) and The Firebird (1984), while Alexander Tatarsky pioneered clay animation with Plasticine Crow (1981), Last Year's Snow Was Falling (1983) and the Good Night, Little Ones! opening (computerized in 2002 as the very first CGI Animation in Russia, made for state television). He and his students also practiced total animation (flying camera with characters and backgrounds moving simultaneously).

Multtelefilm served as a base for Pilot, the first private Soviet animation studio founded by Alexander Tatarsky and Igor Kovalyov in 1988. They aimed at both auteur and commercial animation, producing absurd adult-themed films. In several years half of the team left Russia to work for Klasky Csupo where they created popular animated series such as Rugrats and Aaahh!!! Real Monsters.

The Sverdlovsk Film Studio also gained fame for its paint-on-glass animation with a new level of quality by Aleksei Karaev and Aleksandr Petrov (Welcome!, The Cow), as well as sand animation by Vladimir and Elena Petkevich (A Small Tale of a Small Bug). The rest included the animation department at Lennauchfilm that produced educational and popular science films, the Permtelefilm studio (Perm) responsible for TV animation mostly based on the Ural folklore, Kuybyshevtelefilm (Kuybyshev) known for its stop motion Forest Tales series, Saratovtelefilm (Saratov) and some others.

In 1989, another independent studio, Christmas Films, was founded by Soyuzmultfilm veterans that focused on international coproduction. It became famous during later years with the Russian-British Shakespeare: The Animated Tales series (1992–1994) that earned several Primetime Emmy Awards.

== Russian animation today ==
The Old Man and the Sea (1999).

After the dissolution of the Soviet Union the situation for Russian animators changed dramatically. Due to the new management and the lack of state funding, many of them left Soyuzmultfilm, which was turned into a leased enterprise. In 1993, Yuri Norstein, Fyodor Khitruk, Andrei Khrzhanovsky and Eduard Nazarov founded the SHAR Studio meant for training animators and producing films. Garri Bardin also founded the Stayer animation studio where he continued directing claymation and stop motion films. Others joined Pilot, Christmas Films, Animation Magic and similar companies that lived on advertisement and commissioned works for big studios from Western countries.

In 1992, Films by Jove, an American company run by Oleg Vidov and his wife Joan Borsten, signed a nine-year contract with the new Soyuzmultfilm director Stanislav Rozhkov that gave them exclusive distribution and editing rights for the major part of the studio's collection. They were supposed to share incomes, but only after their expenses had been paid off. As a result, animators received nothing for their past works. In 1993, they elected a new director, a shady businessman Sergei Skulyabin who promised to turn the studio into a joint-stock company. Instead, he signed a new contract with Vidov, extending it from nine to twenty years and returning a number of non-profitable films. His plan was to sell exclusive rights for all past and future films to his dummy corporation and bankrupt the studio.

When animators realized it, they managed to overthrow him with the help of the Union of Cinematographers and Goskino, although the Ministry of State Property still refused to step in and return the studio to its state-owned status. Skulyabin also refused to leave the director's chair up until 30 June 1999 when Sergei Stepashin finally signed a long-awaited order that turned Soyuzmultfilm into a unitary enterprise. By that time the production had completely stopped. In 2001 the High Court of Arbitration of Russia returned the rights to the whole collection back to Soyuzmultfilm which led to a legal battle with Films by Jove. Only in 2007 Vidov and Borsten agreed to sell the collection to the Russian business magnate Alisher Usmanov who donated it to the state-run children's channel Bibigon. Around the same time the studio came back to life.

Nevertheless, there were a few very successful international co-productions, e.g. the aforementioned Shakespeare: The Animated Tales and Aleksandr Petrov's Oscar-winning The Old Man and the Sea (1999). An ambitious project in 12 series Dunno on the Moon was released between 1997 and 1999. Based on the Soviet sci-fi novel of the same name, it was produced at Aleksei Guskov's F.A.F. Entertainment in the best traditions of Soviet hand-made animation. Despite the hardships, Natalya Lukinykh has estimated that Russian animated films won about twice as many prestigious international awards in the 1990s as Russian live-action films.

As Russia's economic situation became increasingly stable, so did the market for animation, and during the last three years, a number of feature-length animation films from Russian studios have emerged (e.g. Melnitsa Animation Studio's Little Longnose, 2003, from Wilhelm Hauff's fairy tale, and Solnechny Dom Studio's 2006 Prince Vladimir, based on early history of Rus' – the highest-grossing Russian animated film to date). While the Russian animation community is yet far from reaching the splendor it possessed before the end of the Soviet Union, a significant recovery is being made and it is becoming more and more clear that the revived Russian animation industry will be very different from what it was in the late 1980s. According to Andrei Dobrunov, head of Solnechny Dom, several Russian studios are currently working on some ten animated feature films.

Especial released on July 31, 2006 was Russia's first CG-animated feature film. At the same time, Soyuzmultfilm has partnered up with Mihail Chemiakin and is working on Hoffmaniada, a puppet-animated feature film which is deliberately being made entirely without computers. In 2007, the Morevna Project was launched, aiming at creating a science fiction re-telling the folk-tale of Marya Morevna as an anime primarily by using the free software Synfig tool and releasing it under a Creative Commons license. Other popular Russian Internet cartoons include Masyanya and Mr. Freeman. A corporate collaboration between the Japanese Studio 4°C and Russia's Molot Entertainment did also produce the anime film First Squad (2009), which won the Kommersant newspaper's prize. The film was finally released in 2018.

Beginning in 2009, animation entered a new crisis as Goskino indefinitely postponed funding for all projects, and for the 2010 budget the state cut animation funding by half. The animation community reacted by appealing to the President and the public. In 2010, many of the major studios, including Pilot, were either closed or on the verge of shutting down. The vast majority of studios had relied on state support to some extent, and Goskino did not fulfill any of their contractual obligations to pay for the films that they had ordered and which the studios had already produced. In addition, Disney has been accused of using anti-competitive practices to sideline domestic Russian competition on TV channels.

The Center of National Film CG animated film Space Dogs, released on March 18, 2010 and about the Soviet space dogs Strelka and Belka, received an English release on June 8, 2012 and spawned a broader franchise. Wizart Animation, alongside InlayFilm, also produced a new CG film version of The Snow Queen (2012), spawning a new franchise with sequels The Snow Queen 2 (2014) and The Snow Queen 3: Fire and Ice (2016), alongside their first fully original concept Sheep and Wolves (2016).

Animaccord Animation Studio has had success in CG television animation with its children's series Masha and the Bear (2009–present), whose emphasis on pantomime has helped it export outside of the country, premièring on the US version of Netflix in August 2015. Another long running, educational, children's series by Melnitsa Animation Studio called Luntik has aired since September 1, 2006. An earlier success in this market was Kikoriki which aired from May 7, 2004 until 2012, produced by Petersburg Animation Studio with assistance from the Ministry of Culture of the Russian Federation. English-language distribution rights to the series were acquired by 4Kids Entertainment from worldwide distributor Fun Game Media, Munich and began airing as part of The CW4Kids block on The CW on September 13, 2008, under the name GoGoRiki. In 2011 a prequel feature film was released entitled Kikoriki. Team Invincible and further films are planned. A connecting factor in many recent Russian animated efforts is Timur Bekmambetov, whose Bazelevs Company has helped produce, finance and promote Kikoriki and The Snow Queen.

In 2010, the animated series The Fixies premiered on Karusel and Russia 1.

In 2018, Soyuzmultfilm, announced plans to restore films from its Golden Collection. On 5 December 2020, the second part of the Golden Collection was restored and released theatrically by United Network "Cinema Park" in Russia. The release was followed up online premiere service viewing options.

== Popular animation studios ==
- Soyuzmultfilm, Pilot, and Toonbox
- Melnitsa Animation Studio
- Petersburg Animation Studio
- Animaccord Animation Studio
- Voronezh Animation Studio

== See also ==
- History of animation
- Animator.ru
- Masters of Russian Animation
- Encyclopedia of Domestic Animation
- KROK International Animated Films Festival
- Open Russian Festival of Animated Film
- Magia Russica
- Moscow Animation Museum
