= Boris Filchikov =

Soviet sound operator

Boris Pavlovich Filchikov
- Бори́с Па́влович Фи́льчиков
- Born: Boris Pavlovich Filchikov; 3 August 1918; Russian SFSR
- Died: 15 January 2006 (aged 87); Moscow, Russia
- Occupation: Sound operator
- Years active: 1938–1997
- Known for: Providing sound to over 500 Soviet and Russian cartoons

Boris Pavlovich Filchikov (Russian: Бори́с Па́влович Фи́льчиков; 3 August 1918 – 15 January 2006) was a Soviet and Russian sound operator. He participated in the creation of about 500 Soviet and Russian cartoons and in the dubbing of foreign cartoons and feature films. Honoured Cultural Worker of the RSFSR (1987).

== Biography ==
Filchikov was born on 3 August 1918.

At the age of 20, he graduated from the Rostov technical school.

At the age of 32, he graduated from the Leningrad Institute of Film Engineers with a degree in electrical engineering.

In 1938–1940, he worked as a laboratory technician at the Research Institute of Cinematography.

He participated in the Great Patriotic War.

In 1946–1948, he was the head of the sound department of the Stereokino studio.

He became one of the most notable sound operators in Soyuzmultfilm, where he began to work in 1948 and retired in 1997.

He died on 15 January 2006 and was buried in the 13th section of the Babushkinskoye cemetery.

== Filmography (partial) ==
- The Wild Swans (1962)
- Left-Hander (1964)
- Go There, Don't Know Where (1966)
- Junior and Karlsson (1968)
- Umka (1969)
- Umka is Looking for a Friend (1970)
- Karlsson has Returned (1970)
- Losharik (1971)
- The Battle of Kerzhenets (1971)
- The Nutcracker (1973)
- The Heron and the Crane (1974)
- The Humpbacked Horse (1975 version)
- Hedgehog in the Fog (1975)
- Happy Merry-Go-Round (1976)
- The Steadfast Tin Soldier (1976)
- 38 Parrots (1976–1991)
- Three from Prostokvashino (1978)
- The Flying Ship (1979)
- Tale of Tales (1979)
- Vacation in Prostokvashino (1980)
- Adventures of Vasya Kurolesov (1981)
- The Mystery of the Third Planet (1981)
- Once Upon a Dog (1982)
- Cheburashka Goes to School (1983)
- The Tale of Tsar Saltan (1984)
- Winter in Prostokvashino (1984)
- Laughter and Grief by the White Sea (1988)
- The Gnomes and the Mountain King (1993)
- Dreamers from the Ugory Village (1994)

== Awards ==
- 2nd Class Order of the Patriotic War
- Medal "For Courage"
- Honoured Cultural Worker of the RSFSR (1987)
