= The Tale of Tsar Saltan (1984 film) =

- Directed by: Lev Milchin; Ivan Ivanov-Vano
- Written by: Aleksandr Pushkin (libretto); Lev Milchin; Ivan Ivanov-Vano
- Starring: Mariya Vinogradova; Mikhail Zimin; Roman Filippov; Lyudmila Ivanova
- Narrated by: Avangard Leontyev
- Edited by: Nataliya Stepantseva
- Music by: Mikhail Meyerovich
- Release date: January 1, 1984
- Running time: 56 minutes
- Country: Soviet Union
- Language: Russian

The Tale of Tsar Saltan (Russian: Ска́зка о царе́ Салта́не, romanized: Skazka o tsare Saltanye) is a 1984 Soviet traditionally animated feature film directed by Lev Milchin and Ivan Ivanov-Vano and produced at the Soyuzmultfilm studio. It is an adaptation of the 1831 poem of the same name by Aleksandr Pushkin. There are few words in the film besides those of the poem itself, which is read from beginning to end by the narrator and the voice actors. Some portions of the poem are skipped.

The movie was adapted in English in the 1990s by Films by Jove for the series Stories from My Childhood.

== Plot ==
Nearly identical to that of the original poem.

Three maidens under a window spun late in the evening ... And then much that was: both love, and slander, both treachery, and miracles, and set of magic adventures, and thirty three athletes, and, of course, happy end ...

Adventures of the brave tsarevitch Gvidon, the great tsarevna-Swan and the tsar Saltan will remind that love, fidelity and strength of mind always win!

== Creators ==
	English	Russian
Directors	Lev Milchin; Ivan Ivanov-Vano	Лев Мильчин; Иван Иванов-Вано
Scenario	Lev Milchin; Ivan Ivanov-Vano	Лев Мильчин; Иван Иванов-Вано
Art directors	Lev Milchin; Ivan Ivanov-Vano	Лев Мильчин; Иван Иванов-Вано
Artists	Irina Svetlitsa; Igor Oleynikov; Marina Ignatenko; I. Troyanova; V. Maksimovich; T. Gerasimenko; G. Stepanenko; L. Alyokhina	Ирина Светлица; Игорь Олейников; Марина Игнатенко; И. Троянова; В. Максимович; Т. Герасименко; Г. Степаненко; Л. Алёхина
Animators	Marina Rogova; Nikolay Fyodorov; Anatoliy Abarenko; Andrei Ignatenko; Vladimir Zarubin; Yuriy Meshcheryakov; Marina Voskanyants; Antonina Alyoshina; Aleksandr Panov; Vladimir Krumin; Sergei Avramov; Viktor Likhachyov	Марина Рогова; Николай Фёдоров; Анатолий Абаренов; Андрей Игнатенко; Владимир Зарубин; Юрий Мещеряков; Марина Восканьянц; Антонина Алёшина; Александр Панов; Владимир Крумин; Сергей Аврамов; Виктор Лихачёв
Camera operator	Mikhail Druyan	Михаил Друян
Executive producer	Liliana Monakhova	Лилиана Монахова
Composer	Mikhail Meyerovich	Михаил Меерович
Sound operator	Boris Filchikov	Борис Фильчиков
Script editor	Raisa Frichinskaya	Раиса Фричинская
Voice actors	Mariya Vinogradova; Mikhail Zimin; Roman Filippov; N. Boronina; A. Pokrovskaya; Lyudmila Ivanova; Anastasiya Zuyeva; Nikolai Grabbe; Boris Novikov; A. Zolotnitskiy	Мария Виноградова; Михаил Зимин; Роман Филиппов; Н. Боронина; А. Покровская; Людмила Иванова; Анастасия Зуева; Николай Граббе; Борис Новиков; А. Золотницкий
Narrator	Avangard Leontyev	Авангард Леонтьев
Editor	Nataliya Stepantseva	Наталия Степанцева

== Reception ==
Fellow film director Yuri Norstein, who had previously worked with Ivanov-Vano, praised Tsar Saltan's direction:

Ivan Ivanov-Vano was the first to use the motifs and techniques of folk art in animation. From his studies at Vkhutemas, education in the traditions of the Russian avant-garde, excellent knowledge of world artistic culture – all this was reflected in his work. From an art historian’s point of view, he could be called a formalist; he was not afraid to experiment. This director’s experiment was "The Humpbacked Horse", which has become a classic. In it, Ivanov-Vano combined everything: love for Russian culture, usage of poetry, knowledge of the profession, and good command of the entire arsenal of animation of that time. He used Disney’s technology to create a powerful innovation – a Russian film. The merit of the artist Lev Milchin was of course essential to Ivan’s creation, for all his life he never parted ways with him. Their last work was ‘’The Tale of Tsar Saltan’’. It was the perfect tandem - the irrepressible nature, the warrior-man, fanatic, tyrant Vano. Intellectual to the core, he did not permit anything superfluous; he understood everything, acute to the grotesque Milchin. For several decades, its elements, its natural habitat – remained a Russian fairy tale.

== Home video ==
The Tale of Tsar Saltan was first released on home video in the early 1990s, by film association Krupny Plan. Several years later, Krupny Plan again issued the film, in a VHS collection that contained other animated adaptations of Pushkin's fairy tales. The film was later released by original producer Soyuzmultfilm. In the 2000s it was reissued on DVD by both Soyuzmultfilm and Krupny Plan, and in 2003 with Soyuzmultfilm's collection "A Gold Collection of Favourite Cartoons”.

== See also ==
- History of Russian animation
- List of animated feature-length films
- List of films based on poems
