= Ivan Ivanov-Vano =

Soviet and Russian animation director, animator, screenwriter and educator

Ivan Ivanov-Vano PAU
- Иван Иванов-Вано
- Born: Ivan Petrovich Ivanov; February 8, 1900; Moscow, Russian Empire
- Died: March 25, 1987 (aged 87); Moscow, Russian SFSR, USSR
- Occupations: Animator, screenwriter, educator
- Spouse: Tatiana Ivanova-Bekker (m. 1928; died 1982)
- Children: 1

Ivan Petrovich Ivanov-Vano (Russian: Иван Петрович Иванов-Вано; 8 February [O.S. 27 January] 1900 – 25 March 1987), born Ivanov, was a Soviet and Russian animation director, animator, screenwriter, educator, professor at Gerasimov Institute of Cinematography (VGIK). One of the pioneers of the Soviet animation school, he is sometimes called the "Patriarch of Soviet animation". He was named People's Artist of the USSR in 1985.

== Biography ==
Ivan Petrovich Ivanov was born in the Manezhnaya Square district, at the time populated by students and poor people. His parents had a peasant background. His father was a shoemaker who arrived to Moscow from the Kaluga Governorate; soon he left the family. Ivanov's mother was illiterate and couldn't give her son a proper education, thus he was raised in the family of his elder sister Evdokia Petrovna Spasskaya who was married to an artist and educator at the Moscow School of Painting, Sculpture and Architecture. As a result, Ivanov became interested in art early in his life and as a kid drew decorations for a puppet theater.

At the age of 14, Ivanov also entered the Moscow School of Painting. After the October Revolution it was reformed and turned into Vkhutemas (Higher Art and Technical Studios). He continued his studies and finally graduated from Vkhutemas in 1923. In a year, Ivanov started working as an animator at the State Film Technicum. Together with his fellow students he created some of the first Soviet animated films using home-made tools. Their works were distinguished by cutout animation and unique art style influenced by constructivism.

In 1927, Ivanov turned to traditional animation with one of the boldest experiments The Skating Rink directed by Yuri Zhelyabuzhsky. In later years he took part in a number of other important projects. Around the same time he started using Ivanov-Vano as a pseudonym. According to some of his colleagues, this was done in order to distinguish himself from another prominent Soviet animator Aleksandr Ivanov.

In 1936, Ivanov started working as a director at the newly founded Soyuzmultfilm. His earlier works at the studio were heavily influenced by early Disney, a popular trend during the middle 1930s which he later opposed. In 1939, Ivanov directed Moydodyr based on the fairy tale of the same name which became a big step from the Disney stylistics towards more traditional Russian art that predominated during later years.

In 1939, Ivanov organized animation courses at VGIK where he also became one of the leading educators (he was granted the title of professor in 1952). Among his students were Lev Milchin, Yevgeniy Migunov, Aleksandr Petrov, Francheska Yarbusova, Stanislav Sokolov and a Bulgarian animator Todor Dinov. Ivanov was a member of the Communist Party from 1951, and was also a founder and the original Vice President of ASIFA (International Animated Film Association) from 1961 to 1973.

Ivanov-Vano directed a record number of Soviet feature animated films, often working as a screenwriter as well. The majority of his works were based on Russian folklore and fairy tales by classical Russian writers. In 1947, shortly after the end of war, Ivanov presented the first Soviet feature-length animated film The Humpbacked Horse based on the fairy tale in verse by Pyotr Pavlovich Yershov. The film gained a lot of praise internationally, and Walt Disney even used it as a teaching tool for his studios.

Since 1962 his artistic style varied a lot. He approached lubok, icon painting, frescoes, Dymkovo toys, lace and Russian avant-garde. Some of his longtime collaborators such as Alexandra Snezhko-Blotskaya and Yuri Norstein who started as his second unit directors and co-directors went on to become popular directors on their own. Ivanov-Vano was a laureate of numerous festivals. His short film The Battle of Kerzhenets won Grand Prix award at Animafest Zagreb in 1972.

Ivanov died on March 25, 1987, and was buried at the Novodevichy Cemetery. For 54 years, he was married to Tatiana Ivanova-Bekker (1902–1982). They had a daughter Galina.

== Films ==
- China in Flames (1925) – one of the first Soviet animated films. He participated as an artist.
- Ice Rink (1927)
- Sen'ka the African (1927)
- The Adventures of Munchhausen (1928)
- Black and White (1932) – with L.A. Amalriko
- The Tale of the Czar Durondai (1934) – with V.C. and Z.C. Brumberg
- The Dragonfly and the Ant (1935) – with V.C. and Z.C. Brumberg
- Kotofey Kotofeyich (1937)
- Journal of Political Satire 1 (1938)
- Little Liar (Girl) (1938)
- The Three Musketeers (1938)
- Moidodyr (1939 and 1954)
- Ivas' (1940)
- Journal of Political Satire 2 (1944) – with V.C. and Z.C. Brumberg, O.P. Hodataev and A.V. Ivanov
- Stolen Sun (1944)
- Winter Tale (1945)
- The Humpbacked Horse (1947) – remade in 1976
- Geese-Swans (1949) – with A.G. Snezhko-Blotska
- Another's Voice (1949)
- The Story of the Dead Princess and a Brave Family (1951) – based on Pushkin's fairy tale
- The Snow Maiden (1952)
- Forest Concert (1953)
- The Brave Hare (1955)
- The Twelve Months (1956)
- Song about Friendship (1957)
- Once Upon a Time... (1957)
- The Adventures of Buratino (1959) – based on Buratino, a collaboration with Dmitri Babichenko
- The Flying Proletariat (1962) – with I. Boyarskii
- Lefty (1964) – also called The Mechanical Flea
- How One Man Fed Two Generals (1965) – with V. Danilevich
- Go There, Don't Know Where (1966) – with V. Danilevich
- Legend About a Malicious Giant (1968)
- The Seasons of the Year (1969) – based on Tchaikovsky's The Seasons (Troika and Fall)
- The Battle of Kerzhenets (1970) – a collaboration with Yuri Norstein
- Ave Maria (1972)
- The Humpbacked Horse (1976) – remake of 1947 film
- The Magic Lake (1979) – stereographic animation
- The Tale of Tsar Saltan (1984) – based on a poem by Pushkin

== See also ==
- History of Russian animation
- Lists of animated films
- Lev Atamanov

== Sources ==
- Giannalberto Bendazzi – Cartoons: One Hundred Years of Animation, 1995
- Full filmography at the Animator.ru
- Filmography at Animatsiya.net, where most of his films can be watched with English subtitles
- New York Times Biography
