= Film.ru =

Russian cinema web portal

- Screenshot Film.ru in May 2021
- Website type: Web portal, online movie database
- Available in: Russian
- Owner: Ekaterina Karslidi
- Website: https://film.ru/
- Commercial: No
- Registration: Optional
- Launched: December 1999; 26 years ago
- Current status: Active

Film.ru, sometimes known in Russian as Фильм.ру, is a Russian web portal dedicated to cinema. The website publishes news, analytical articles, Russian film showtimes, box office performances, film reviews and maintains a film and tv show database. Founded in December 1999, it is one of the oldest Russian websites still operating that is dedicated to the film industry.

According to the Russian review aggregator Kritikanstvo, Film.ru has published over 3,000 film reviews.

== History ==
Film.ru was created in 1999 by Sergei Aksyonov (born 6 September 1975) who also created the websites Arthouse.ru and Video Guide. The website was managed by Film LLC until 2006, when the website was acquired by Entertime. In 2007, Anton Kostylev was appointed editor-in-chief of Film.ru. During this time, the web traffic for the website tripled.

In 2013, Boris Khokhlov, former editor-in-chief of Total DVD and Russian Empire, became the editor-in-chief of Film.ru, after which the site had an independent editorial board. The site also began regular publications of articles and film reviews. Since July 2018, Ekaterina Karslidi, who previously worked on the Russian film website Cinemaholics, has been the editor-in-chief.

== See also ==
- Cinema of Russia
- Animator.ru – online film database for the Russian animation industry
- KinoPoisk – Russian film database
