= The Overcoat (animated film) =

- Directed by: Yuri Norstein
- Screenplay by: Yuri Norstein; Lyudmila Petrushevskaya
- Based on: "The Overcoat" by Nikolai V. Gogol
- Produced by: Yuri Norstein
- Cinematography: Aleksandr B. Zhukovskiy; Maksim Granik
- Animation by: Yuri Norstein; Francheska Yarbusova
- Running time: 65 minutes (planned)
- Country: Russia

The Overcoat (Russian: Шине́ль, Shinyél’) is an unfinished Russian animated drama film that has been the main project of Russian director and animator Yuri Norstein since 1981. It is based on "The Overcoat" (1842), a short story by Nikolai Vasilyevich Gogol.

Around 25 minutes were completed by 2004. The unfinished film has been shown publicly in several exhibitions of Norstein's work around the world and clips of it have been included in a few documentary films about Russian animation and culture. A Japanese theatrical documentary, Yuriy Norshteyn: Making The Overcoat, premiered in 2018.

On March 13, 2007, Norstein stated that he planned to release the first 30 minutes of the film with a soundtrack into theatres by the end of 2007. However, as of 2026, the film remains unfinished, and its production time of nearly 45 years is the longest for any animated motion picture in history.

== Plot ==
The film is based on "The Overcoat" (1842), a short story by Nikolai Vasilyevich Gogol. However, Yuri Norstein has said that "the cinematographer should not be interested in that which is described in detail – he should look to that which is skipped, to that which is implied but is not explicitly written. The break in the text is the most promising, the most alive place for cinema."

== History ==
Upon finishing his film Tale of Tales in 1979, Norstein decided that the next project for his small team (consisting of himself as the animator and director, his wife Francheska Yarbusova as the artist, and his friend Aleksandr Zhukovskiy as the cinematographer) would be an approximately 60-minute-long film based on Gogol's short story The Overcoat. Norstein has said that he considers The Overcoat to be as important a work of literature as one of the chapters of the Bible for him personally.

By 1981, when work on the film began, Norstein had been working at Soyuzmultfilm (the main Soviet animation studio) for 13 years and had worked on some 40 films and directed or co-directed six. Progress was slow, with many interruptions (Norstein estimates that only about three years of work were actually done). Norstein says that Viktor Tinyaev (Виктор Тиняев) helped him during this period. In 1986, with only 10 minutes of the film completed, Norstein was fired from the Soyuzmultfilm studio in which he had worked. This was despite the fact that his films had gathered many international awards and that Tale of Tales had been voted the best animated film of all time by a large panel of international critics in 1984.

With the help of Rolan Bykov, Norstein managed to set up his own animation studio in his home. There, he and his team continued to slowly work on the film. Funding has been sporadic and has come from many different sources, including the Savings Bank of Russia (Sberbank) and TNK oil company. A few minutes were shot under the Soros Fund before 1999. Norstein has been known for refusing funding from certain sources. He refused to accept money from Mikhail Shvydkoy, the Russian Minister of Culture, saying "one cannot take money from those who don't care about you." He also refused help from Nick Park's company Aardman Animations, accepting from them only a few boxes of lightbulbs.

Production came to a temporary halt on November 17, 1999 with the death of cinematographer Aleksandr Zhukovskiy (Александр Жуковский). The loss was crippling for Norstein; he said of Zhukovskiy that he was the only person who ever saw exactly eye-to-eye with him both as an artist and as a friend. By 2001, production had resumed with a new cinematographer, Maksim Granik (Максим Граник), one of Zhukovskiy's students. Production soon halted again, this time for three years. Norstein spent a year and a half making a 3-minute animation for the introduction to Good Night, Little Ones!, a popular Russian nightly show for young children to watch before they go to bed (it was replaced by a computerized version of the iconic sequences made by Alexander Tatarsky). He also spent nine months working on a 2-minute sequence for the Japanese collaborative film Winter Days (released in 2003). Norstein said that this sequence required as much work as a 10-minute film, and that his work on it influenced The Overcoat and vice versa (the sequence contains a scene with Bashō searching for ticks in his cloak which is similar to a scene in The Overcoat).

In a July 4, 2004 interview, Norstein said that 25 minutes of The Overcoat had been shot.

The studio stopped working on the film for nearly a year while Norstein worked to release his two-volume book, Snow on the Grass, released on August 10, 2008.

As of March 2013, Norstein was still working on the film—his ardent perfectionism has earned him the nickname "The Golden Snail". Although he has been offered chances to leave Russia, Norstein believes that finishing his film in "circumstances approaching comfort" would be impossible.

In a February 2014 interview, Norstein revealed that profits from sales of his recent books and licensing deals are going into supporting his work on a new film, but refused to confirm whether that film is The Overcoat. In April 2015, Norstein said in an interview that most of his time is being spent working on The Overcoat.

== Cast and crew ==
Yuri Norstein is the writer, director, and animator for the film. His wife, Francheska Yarbusova, is the main artist responsible for the characters and backgrounds. Other artists who were working on the film as of 2004 were Larisa Zenevich, Lena Sharapova and Valentin Olshvang (who earlier worked with Norstein on the Spokoynoy nochi, malyshi! sequence). Aleksandr Zhukovskiy was the cinematographer until his death on November 17, 1999. A student of his, Maksim Granik, has been the cinematographer since 2001.

There is not expected to be much dialogue in the film. Norstein originally had Alexander Kalyagin in mind to play the main role. However, he has said that his idea of the main character has since changed, and that he is not yet sure who the final voice actor will be.

== Technique ==
Norstein animating one of the scenes in the film that required a specialised set.

The animation used is cut-out animation, a type of stop motion. Norstein uses a special technique involving multiple glass panels to give his animation a three-dimensional look. The camera is placed at the top looking down on a series of glass panels about a meter deep (one every 25–30 cm). The individual glass panels can move horizontally as well as toward and away from the camera (to give the effect of a character moving closer or further away). Some scenes required a different approach, as can be seen in the image on the right.

Norstein refuses to use a computer in his work, and says that even watching computer-animated films makes him ill.

The film is being shot in black-and-white film. Due to the closure of Moscow labs that develop black-and-white film, Norstein's team is currently being forced to develop it themselves.

== See also ==
- History of Russian animation
- List of animated feature films
- List of recent films in black-and-white
- List of stop-motion films
- List of films with longest production time

Other animated films with long production histories

- The Thief and the Cobbler, in production 1964–1993, released hastily finished.
- The King and the Mockingbird, a French animated film, produced in two parts (1948–52, 1967–80), initially released in recut form, eventually finished as per director’s wishes.
- Mad God, a stop-motion animated film by Phil Tippett started in 1990 and completed in 2021.
