= The Overcoat =

1842 story by Nikolai Gogol

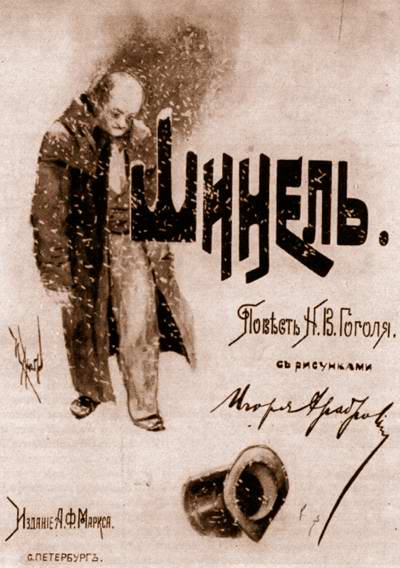
Cover, by Igor Grabar, 1890s

"The Overcoat" (Russian: Шине́ль, romanized: Shinél; also translated as "The Cloak" or "The Mantle") is a short story by Nikolai Gogol, published in 1843. The story has had a great influence on Russian literature. Eugène-Melchior de Vogüé, discussing Russian realist writers, said: "We all came out from under Gogol's Overcoat" (a quote often misattributed to Dostoevsky). Writing in 1941, Vladimir Nabokov described "The Overcoat" as "The greatest Russian short story ever written".

== Plot ==
The story narrates the life and death of titular councillor Akaky Akakievich Bashmachkin (Russian: Акакий Акакиевич Башмачкин), an impoverished government clerk and copyist in the Russian capital of St. Petersburg. Although Akaky is dedicated to his job, he is little recognized in his department for his hard work. Instead, the younger clerks tease him and attempt to distract him whenever they can. His threadbare overcoat is often the butt of their jokes. Akaky decides it is necessary to have the coat repaired, so he takes it to his tailor, Petrovich, who declares the coat irreparable, telling Akaky he must buy a new overcoat.

The cost of a new overcoat is beyond Akaky's meager salary, so he forces himself to live within a strict budget to save sufficient money to buy the new overcoat. Meanwhile, he and Petrovich frequently meet to discuss the style of the new coat. During that time, Akaky's zeal for copying is replaced with excitement about his new overcoat, to the point that he thinks of little else. Finally, with the addition of an unexpectedly large holiday salary bonus, Akaky has saved enough money to buy a new overcoat.

Akaky and Petrovich go to the shops in St. Petersburg and pick the finest materials they can afford (marten fur was too expensive, so they use cat fur for the collar). The new coat is of impressively good quality and appearance and is the talk of Akaky's office on the day he arrives wearing it. His superior decides to host a party honoring the new overcoat, at which the habitually solitary Akaky is out of place; after the party, Akaky goes home, far later than he normally would. En route home, two ruffians confront him, take his coat, kick him down, and leave him in the snow.

Akaky finds no help from the authorities in recovering his lost overcoat. Finally, on the advice of another clerk in his department, he asks for help from an "important personage" (Russian: значительное лицо, znachitelnoye litso), a general recently promoted to his position who belittles and shouts at his subordinates to solidify his self-importance. After keeping Akaky waiting, the general demands of him exactly why he has brought so trivial a matter to him, personally, and not presented it to his secretary. Socially inept Akaky makes an unflattering remark concerning departmental secretaries, provoking so powerful a scolding from the general that he nearly faints and must be led from the general's office. Soon afterward, Akaky falls deathly ill with fever. In his last hours, he is delirious, imagining himself again sitting before the general; at first, Akaky pleads forgiveness, but as his death nears, he curses the general.

Soon, a corpse, identified as Akaky's ghost, haunts areas of St. Petersburg, taking overcoats from people; the police are finding it difficult to capture him. Finally, Akaky's ghost catches up with the general—who, since Akaky's death, had begun to feel guilt over having mistreated him—and takes his overcoat, frightening him terribly; satisfied, Akaky is not seen again. The narrator ends his narration with the account of another ghost seen in another part of the city. This other ghost meets the description of one of the ruffians.

== Characters ==
Akaky Akakievich Bashmachkin: An archetypal "Little Man" , a clerk in one of the departments of the Russian government in St. Petersburg, the nation's capital city. Bashmachkin, about fifty, is a quiet, self-effacing man with red hair and a receding hairline. His job is to copy documents such as letters. Although he enjoys his work and never makes a mistake, he has no desire to take on more challenging work, realizing that he has limited capabilities. Because he is meek and dresses shabbily, most of his coworkers regard him as a nobody and frequently pick on him. When his cloak becomes so frayed that it can no longer protect him against the bitter cold, he dedicates himself to saving enough money to purchase a new cloak.

Petrovich: One-eyed, heavy-drinking, decent tailor whom Bashmachkin hires to make his new cloak. Petrovitch was once a serf.

Wife of Petrovich: Woman of plain looks whom the narrator says Petrovitch calls "a low female and a German" when they argue.

Bearded Assailants: Men who steal Akaky's new cloak.

Landlady of Bashmachkin: Elderly woman who advises Akaky to report the theft of his cloak to the district police chief.

District Police Chief: Official who hears Akaky's report about his stolen cloak. The policeman asks Akaky embarrassing questions, as if he was a criminal. The policeman is of no help.

Employee With Advice: Coworker of Akaky who advises him to see a certain prominent personage in a government office who will help Akaky track down his stolen cloak.

Prominent Personage: Bureaucrat mainly concerned with demonstrating the power he wields as a supervisor. He excoriates Akaky for not going through the proper government channels to get an interview. He is of no help.

Physician: Doctor called after Akaky develops a throat infection. He tells Akaky's landlady to order a coffin.

== Interpretations ==
Gogol makes much of Akaky's name in the opening passages, saying, "…it was quite out of the question to give him any other name..." The literal meaning of the name Akaky, derived from the Greek, is "without blemish,” which describes him as innocent and pure. Though, noted by Simon Karlinsky, the name sounds, in Russian, as though it could’ve been derived from “okakat,” or “obkakat,” meaning “to cover with excrement.” This present Akaky Akakievich as a layered character—he is pathetic, yet pure—all together working towards portraying Akaky as a ridiculous figure, that is both hopeless, and unlucky. His surname Bashmachkin, meanwhile, comes from the word 'bashmak', a type of shoe. It is used in an expression "быть под башмаком" which means to be "under someone's thumb" or to "be henpecked".

Akaky progresses from an introverted and hopeless but functioning non-entity with no expectations of social or material success to one whose self-esteem and thereby expectations are raised by the overcoat. Akaky is described as humorously fit for his position as a non-entity. He is not oppressed by the nature of bureaucratic work because he enjoys performing bureaucratic tasks like copying because he lacks an inner life. Gogol makes light of his fitness for mundane bureaucratic activities by joking that Akaky "…had been born in undress uniform with a bald head." When Akaky is asked to make a minor change in a document instead of merely copying it, he cannot do it. Akaky is "labored with love" and longed for nothing but copying. Akaky is a caricature of a low-ranked-unpassionate man not wanting to, nor supposed to, achieve anything in life. A good contrast to this is Herman Melville's "Bartleby, the Scrivener". Bartleby is quite adept at his job as a copyist, but arrives "incurably forlorn" when he is first employed. Bartleby begins rejecting more, and more, of his work, until he finally dies, staring at a wall, and having rejected life itself. Bartleby's antisocial, otherworldly and melancholy features make him uncanny and he has been interpreted as a provocateur of existential crisis. Akaky, on the other hand, is presented in a humorous way initially. This is partly because he represents a "type" presented in anecdotal form by Gogol.

Critics have noted the famous "humane passage" which demonstrates a sudden shift in the narration's style from comic to tragic. Though Akaky is not oppressed by his task, he is by his coworkers who treat him "in a coolly despotic way" and "laughed at and made fun of him". Akaky usually does not respond, until finally he is provoked to exclaim "Leave me alone! Why do you insult me?" Upon hearing this, one new worker was compelled to stop. This young man never forgot Akaky and his "heart-rending words" which carried the unspoken message "I am thy brother." Remembering Akaky he "shuddered at how much inhumanity there is in man." Indeed, the coworker's comments underscore one possible interpretation of the story:

"How little humane feeling after all was to be found in men's hearts; how much coarseness and cruelty was to be found even in the educated and those who were everywhere regarded as good and honorable men."

The narrator's portrayal of Akaky jars the reader, like the young man himself, from carefree mockery to graven sympathy. Gogol is noted for his instability of style, tone, genre among other literary devices, as Boris Eichenbaum notes. Eichenbaum also notes that Gogol wrote "The Overcoat" in a skaz—a difficult-to-translate colloquial language in Russian deriving from or associated with an oral storytelling tradition.

Akaky's overcoat allows him to become human instead of a merely bureaucratic tool. A Marxist reading of the text would interpret Akaky's material desire as granting him humanity. The story does not condemn private acquisition and materialism, but asserts that human beings can have fulfillment from attention to material goods. Material goods, in particular clothing, do not merely mask real human character, but can modify a person's identity in a positive and liberating way. Akaky's social alienation and belittlement give way to community inclusion and genuine respect.

It is also possible to read the text from a psychoanalytic perspective. Akaky's libido is repressed and sublimated into the task of copying. After he acquires the coat, he expresses sexual interest. Akaky "even started to run, without knowing why, after some lady." He also "halted out of curiosity before a shop window to look at a picture representing a handsome woman...baring her whole foot in a very pretty way." He laughs and does not know why because he experiences previously unknown feelings. Akaky also treats the coat with the tenderness and obsession of a lover. When the construction of the coat is first commissioned Akaky feels that his existence became "fuller, as if he were married."

Akaky's low position in the bureaucratic hierarchy is evident, and the extent to which he looks up the hierarchical ladder is well documented; sometimes forgotten, according to Harold McFarlin, is that he is not the lowest-ranked in the hierarchy and thus in society. He has mastered the bureaucratic language and has internalized it to the extent that he describes and treats the non-civil servants ("only two 'civilians,' the landlady and tailor, play more than incidental roles") as if they are part of the same world—the tailor is described as sitting "like a Turkish Pasha", that is, a government official, and Akaky "treats the self-effacing old landlady just like his bosses treat him at the office ('somehow coldly and despotically')".

Despite all hope, Akaky Akakievich's life does not change significantly as a result of acquiring the coat. Although his new coat attracts attention, he himself does not. While he already embodied the paradigmatic cog in the system during his lifetime, his transformation into a ghost makes the absence of any individuality, and ultimately his authoritarian personality (Adorno), completely recognizable. The ghost gradually loses his Akaky identity, becomes someone indeterminate and resembles the robbers who previously stole Akaky's coat.

== Critical assessment ==
Vladimir Nabokov, writing in his Lectures on Russian Literature, gave the following appraisal of Gogol and his most famous story: "Steady Pushkin, matter-of-fact Tolstoy, restrained Chekhov have all had their moments of irrational insight which simultaneously blurred the sentence and disclosed a secret meaning worth the sudden focal shift. But with Gogol this shifting is the very basis of his art, so that whenever he tried to write in the round hand of literary tradition and to treat rational ideas in a logical way, he lost all trace of talent. When, as in the immortal The Overcoat, he really let himself go and pottered on the brink of his private abyss, he became the greatest artist that Russia has yet produced."

== Adaptations ==
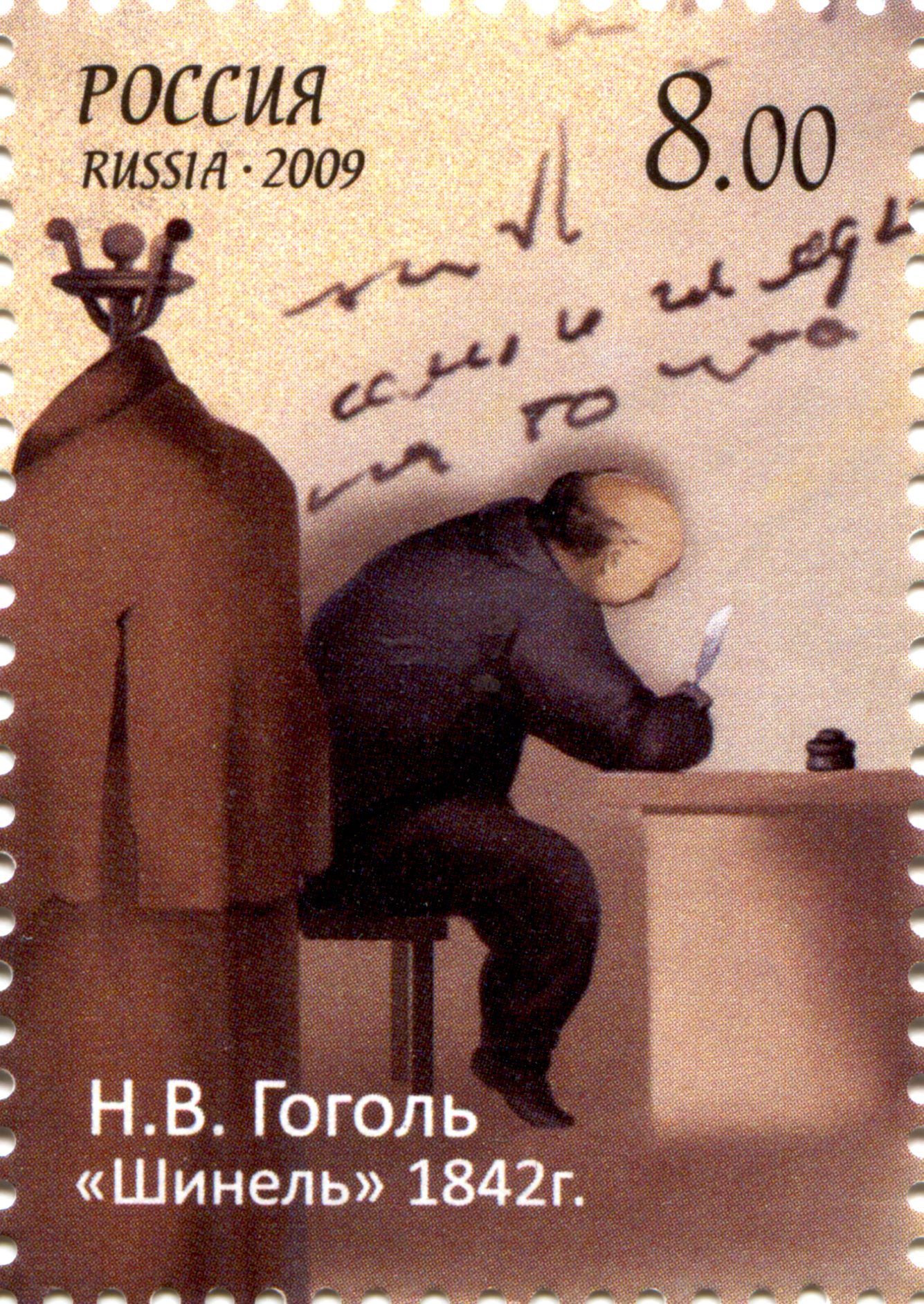
A stamp depicting "The Overcoat", from the souvenir sheet of Russia devoted to the 200th birth anniversary of Nikolai Gogol, 2009

=== Films ===
A number of films have used the story, both in the Soviet Union and in other countries:

- The Overcoat (1916) – an American silent film directed by Rae Berger
- The Overcoat (1926) – a Soviet silent film directed by Grigori Kozintsev and Leonid Trauberg
- The Overcoat (1951) – a film of Marcel Marceau's Mime Play with W. Schleif in Berlin
- The Overcoat ("Il Cappotto") (1952) – an Italian film directed by Alberto Lattuada
- The Awakening (1954), an adaptation for the Douglas Fairbanks, Jr., Presents television series starring Buster Keaton, with the story transposed to an unnamed totalitarian state.
- The Bespoke Overcoat (1955) – an Oscar-winning short British film directed by Jack Clayton based on Wolf Mankowitz's 1953 play of the same name. Here the story is transposed to the East End of London and the protagonists are poor Jews working in the clothing trade.
- The Overcoat (1959) – a Soviet film directed by Aleksey Batalov
- The Overcoat (1976) – an Iraqi Kurdish made-for-TV film adapted by Simko Nakam and directed by Jamal Mohamad
- Nayi Sherwani (1986) – an adaptation for the Indian DD National television series Katha Sagar by Shyam Benegal
- The Overcoat (1997) – a Greek film
- The Overcoat (2001) – a Canadian made-for-TV film produced by the CBC
- The Overcoat – an unfinished animated film by Yuriy Norshteyn and Francheska Yarbusova, in the works since the early 1980s.
- The Overcoat (2017) – a short film adapted and directed by Patrick Myles starring Jason Watkins, Tim Key, Vicki Pepperdine and Alex Macqueen.
- The Overcoat (2018) – an animated special adapted by Hugh O'Conor and directed by Sean Mullen & Meelis Arulepp, starring Cillian Murphy and Alfred Molina.

=== Radio ===
- Gogol's story was adapted twice on the radio series Theatre Royal, first on October 11, 1953, and then on August 4, 1954, both versions starring Sir Michael Redgrave as Akaky.
- Hans Conried starred as Akaky in an adaptation on The CBS Radio Mystery Theater on March 3, 1977.
- On April 3, 2002, the BBC Radio 4 series Three Ivans, Two Aunts and an Overcoat broadcast an adaptation by Jim Poyser of the story starring Stephen Moore as Akaky. In this version, the Very Important Person whose overcoat Akaky's ghost takes is Akaky's immediate superior Colonel Borzov, and the ending is altered to have Akaky's ghost visit him in his office (rather than on his way home in his sleigh, as in the story) to take both the overcoat and Borzov's Very Important Person medal (and a bag of sugared rusks).

=== Ballet ===
- The Russian composer German Okunev was working on a ballet version of 'The Overcoat' at the time of his death in 1973: it was completed and orchestrated by V. Sapozhnikov.
- A recent adaptation by Morris Panych and Wendy Gorling, set to various music by Russian composer Dmitri Shostakovich, was performed by actors using dance and mime. A film version was produced by the CBC.
- The Danish choreographer Flemming Flindt created a version for Dennis Nahat and the Clevelend-San Jose Ballet. The principal role was performed by Rudolph Nureyev at the world premiere at the Edinburgh Festival in the summer of 1990.

== In popular culture ==
- The protagonist in the 2003 novel The Namesake, by Jhumpa Lahiri, is named for Gogol because of the importance that "The Overcoat" had on his father as a young man in Calcutta. The "Gogol" of this novel finds meaning in the story, after struggling with the name given to him by his father. In the novel, Gogol's father justifies his choice for his son's name by saying "We all came out of Gogol's Overcoat......One day you will understand..." An adaptation of the novel was produced as a film, The Namesake, in 2006, directed by Mira Nair.
- The manga Bungo Stray Dogs features a character named after Nikolai Gogol whose supernatural ability is named ''The Overcoat'', which allows him to store and retrieve anything from his overcoat.
