= Francheska Yarbusova =

Russian artist

Francheska Alfredovna Yarbusova
- Франческа Альфредовна Ярбусова
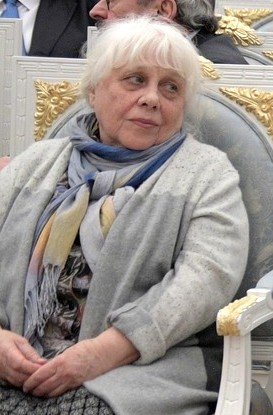
- Yarbusova in 2019
- Born: 13 October 1942 (age 83); Alma-Ata, Kazakh SSR, Soviet Union
- Spouse: Yuri Norstein

Francheska Alfredovna Yarbusova (Russian: Франческа Альфредовна Ярбусова; born 13 October 1942), often credited as F. Yarbusova, is a Russian artist and the wife and collaborator of Yuri Norstein. Her father was Alfred L. Yarbus, a scientist famous for understanding how eye movements help human beings explore images.

== Biography ==
Born in Alma-Ata, then part of Kazakh SSR, Soviet Union, Yarbusova received a degree in film animation from VGIK in 1967, after which she began working for Soyuzmultfilm in the roles of art director or artist.

== Career ==
She debuted as art director in the film A Little Locomotive from Romashkovo, directed by Vladimir Degtyaryov, in 1967. She did also work on other films such as A White Skin and Plasticine Hedgehog, but is primarily known for her work as the art director and artist in the films of Yuri Norstein, beginning with The Battle of Kerzhenets in 1971.

She is currently working with her husband on an adaptation of Nikolai Gogol's Overcoat. The film has been in production since 1981.

== Filmography ==
- 1965 — How One Man Fed Two Generals, Как один мужик двух генералов прокормил (puppets and decorations)
- 1966 — Go There, Don't Know Where, Поди туда, не знаю куда (artist)
- 1967 — A Little Locomotive from Romashkovo, Паровозик из Ромашкова (art director)
- 1968 — A White Skin, Белая шкурка (art director)
- 1969 — Plasticine Hedgehog, Пластилиновый ёжик (art director)
- 1971 — The Boy and the Ball, Мальчик и мячик (art director)
- 1971 — The Battle of Kerzhenets, Сеча при Керженце (artist)
- 1973 — The Fox and the Hare, Лиса и заяц (art director)
- 1974 — The Heron and the Crane, Цапля и журавль (art director)
- 1975 — Hedgehog in the Fog, Ёжик в тумане (art director)
- 1979 — Tale of Tales, Сказка сказок (art director)
- TBA — The Overcoat, Шинель (art director)

== Bibliography ==
Yarbusova has illustrated two books based on Norstein's films:

- "Сказка сказок". Ю. Норштейн. Ф. Ярбусова. 2005, «Красная площадь». ISBN 5-900743-80-2
- "Ёжик в тумане". Ю. Норштейн, Ф. Ярбусова. 2006, «Красная площадь».

== See also ==
- History of Russian animation
