= Moscow Animation Museum =

Museum in Moscow, Russia

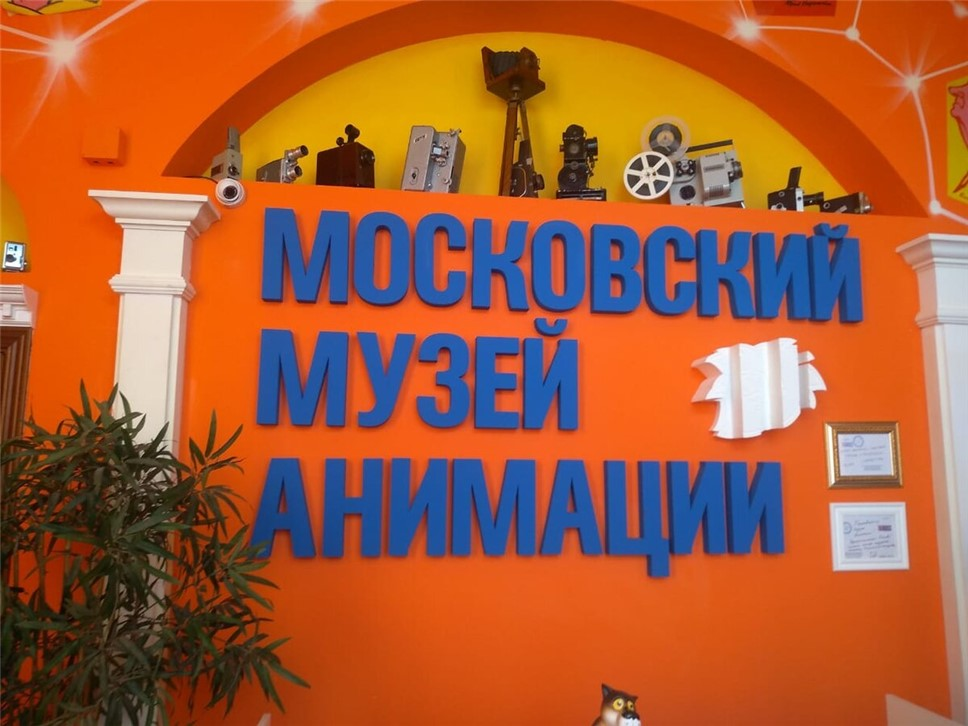
- Established: September 15, 2006
- Location: Moscow, Russia
- Founder: Leonid Shvartsman
- Director: Larisa Evgenievna Vyborgova (general); Kirill Vladimirovich Polikarpov (creative)
- Website: museum.ru/M3095

The Moscow Animation Museum (Russian: Моско́вский Музе́й Анима́ции) is a museum in Moscow dedicated to animation .

The museum was established in 2006 by employees of the animation studio Soyuzmultfilm and the «Soyuzmultfilm V.G.V.» film company. The museum's founder, Leonid Shvartsman, also serves as honorary director. The museum's general director is Larisa Evgenievna Vyborgova, and Kirill Vladimirovich Polikarpov serves as creative director .

The museum's collection of exhibits is related to the history of animation in Russia and abroad. Currently, the main exposition is located on the territory of the Izmailovsky Kremlin.

== History ==
=== Birth of the museum ===
The first creative and anniversary programs of the «Soyuzmultfilm V.G.V.» film company, which included current employees of the «Soyuzmultfilm» studio, were held in 2004. Guests received informative excursion programs, and the employees and veterans of the studio celebrated anniversary holidays in the Cinema House. Personally Leonid Shvartsman, Anna Atamanova, Svetozar Rusakov, Boris Akulinichev, Galina Zebrova, Vladimir Zuikov, Natalia Abramova, Nadezhda Kirichenko, Galina Shakitskaya, Marina Kurchevskaya, Kabul Rasulov, Galina and Vitaly Kositsyns and many others signed a written appeal to the management of «Soyuzmultfilm V. G. V.»

The Moscow Museum of Animation was established in 2006 by veterans of Russian animation. On September 15, 2006, the museum opened, ft the same time, the first exposition dedicated to the history of 20th century animation was opened. Most of this exhibition related to the activities of «Soyuzmultfilm» from the 1960s to the 1980s. The audience was presented with puppets, shooting equipment, sets, sketches, personal belongings of famous animators of Russia and the USSR, documents related to famous cartoons.

=== 2010–present ===
On September 15, 2010, the children's TV channel Nickelodeon invited the Moscow Animation Museum to become a partner. As part of the partnership, the museum opened the Hall of Foreign Animation, which holds a permanent exhibition on Nickelodeon's animated series. Nickelodeon produced a unique 25-minute documentary film for the museum with subtitles in Russian, and made an exclusive collection of dolls of popular TV series in a single copy. The image of the character Naruto from the world-famous anime drawn by its creator Masashi Kishimoto still attracts fans of all ages to the museum.

Since its opening, the staff of the museum have conducted educational master classes and creative meetings , made military-patriotic films , and held charity events .

== Museum patrons ==
The Moscow Animation Museum is a private collection of deposited collections. Veterans of “Soyuzmultfilm” donated their collections to the Museum. Honorary director of the Museum Leonid Aronovich Shvartsman donated 49 works of authorship to the Museum; Boris Akimovich Akulinichev, the production designer and co-author of Inessa Alekseevna Kovalevskaya, donated sketches for the cartoon “How the Lion and the Tortoise Sang a Song”, director Lev Konstantinovich Atamanov's daughter Anna handed over the first gold painted poster of The Golden Antelope.

== Exhibits ==
The museum's exhibits cover the process of creating cartoons, and present real phases and models from cartoons, sketches, puppets and scenery. The museum's holdings include over 15,000 items, 2,500 of which are on display in the exhibition halls. The Tretyakov Gallery does not have enough space to show everything.

The museum complex includes an international museum exposition, a cartoon filming site, a cinema hall and a studio for the production of commercial, author's and experimental animation, which has realized over 500 different projects produced in all possible animation technologies: classical drawn, puppet, documentary, mixed, Flash, Moho, 2D, 3D Stereo, 4D Stereo.

The centerpiece and true pride of the museum is the Hall of Russian animation, represented by puppets of Cheburashka, Crocodile Gena, and Old Lady Shapoklyak, deposited with the museum after the death of Leonid Aronovich Shvartsman. There is also a personal desk of the artist Svetozar Kuzmich Rusakov, the creator of the images of the Hare and the Wolf in Well, Just You Wait! and the exhibition The Bremen Town Musicians with original sketches, types and artistic developments for cartoons by Inessa Kovalevskaya.

The Animation History Hall is dedicated to the inventions of New Age scientists related to the “animation” of images. Praxinoscope, zoetrope, stereoscopes and “magic lanterns” were used to project images in the 18th - 20th centuries. It also broadcasts footage of the world's first cartoon Pauvre Pierrot, made in 1892 by French inventor Emile Reynaud. For fans of interactivity, there is the world's only Zoopro 001 attraction, where anyone can draw a microcartoon.

The Modern History Corridor contains information about contemporary Russian animation studios. The hall was founded with the support of the Animakkord studio (creators of the animated series Bear); the stands display collections of the Char Studio School, Christmas Films, Stayer, the studios of Garry Bardin, Yuri Norshtein and others

The Hall of World Animation holds exhibits related to the development of foreign animation: these include collections from Walt Disney Animation Studios, Warner Bros., Studio Ghibli, Lucasfilm Limited, Nickelodeon Animation, Toei Animation, Mushi Production, Apple Films, and Kitty Films. The central booth is dedicated to the exposition of Nickelodeon channel: exhibits related to the cartoons Dasha the Traveler, SpongeBob SquarePants, and Avatar: The Last Airbender are presented.

The Boohunker screening room broadcasts cartoons made by children with the museum staff in the best traditions and technologies of the Soviet past. Some of them are prize-winners and Grand Prix winners of various children's film festivals.

== Projects ==
The museum holds educational programs that consist of a video tour and a master show .

The museum has held over 70 traveling exhibitions, visiting the Ryazan Kremlin, Kazan Kremlin, Dmitrov Kremlin, Suzdal-Vladimir Kremlin, Kirzhach, Samara, Pereslavl . Every year “Animation Museum” becomes a special guest of entertainment for special programs, forums and exhibitions, and everywhere the main event is the shooting of the author's cartoon .
