= Little Man (stock character) =

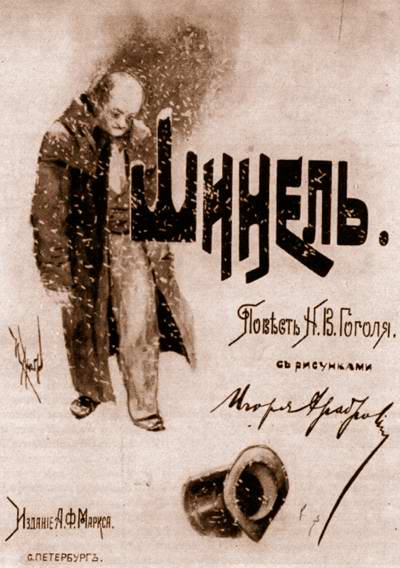
Akakiy Akakiyevich from "The Overcoat"

The "Little Man"' or "Little Person" (Russian: "маленький человек") is a stock character that emerged in the 19th century Russian literature, a person of low social status, with no wealth, no special abilities, no ambitions, and with a weak personal character. While the term was introduced in 1840, by Vissarion Belinsky in an article about the play The Government Inspector by Nicholas Gogol, critics point out that the character appears ealier, e.g., in the novelette The Station Master from The Belkin Tales cycle by Alexander Pushkin. Another early archetypal "Little Man" is Akakiy Akakiyevich from Gogol's short story "The Overcoat"
