= Magia Russica =

- Directed by: Yonathan and Masha Zur
- Cinematography: Yonathan Zur
- Edited by: Yonathan Zur
- Release date: May 10, 2004 (Haifa Film Festival)

Magia Russica is a 2004 Israeli-Russian documentary film directed and produced by Yonathan and Masha Zur. The film explores the history and legacy of Russian animation during the Soviet era, focusing primarily on the work and experiences of animators at the Soyuzmultfilm studio in Moscow. It premiered at the 2004 Haifa Film Festival and has since been screened at 45 international film, animation, and documentary festivals.

The documentary is 96 minutes long and was released on DVD in several countries, including the United States, Japan, France, and Israel. It has also been broadcast in multiple countries, such as Finland, Poland, Estonia, and Greece. The film is presented in Russian with subtitles in various languages, including English.

== Content ==
The documentary's title is Latin for “Russian Magic.” It is taken from animatior Fyodor Khitruk's reference to animation as a sort of magic or sorcery. The filmmakers with the intention to expose this art form to the world outside of Russia from an outsider's point of view. The film traces the development of Soviet animation from its early days, beginning with the founding of Soyuzmultfilm in 1936. It highlights how animation, often perceived as children’s entertainment, was able to bypass some of the strict ideological censorship that affected other art forms like literature and live-action cinema.

Due to full government funding, animators had access to generous budgets and widespread distribution across the USSR’s 112,000 cinemas. This support allowed for a diverse range of styles and themes, drawing from Russian literature (e.g., Alexander Pushkin) and folklore, resulting in works that appealed to both children and adults.

The documentary also addresses the impact of the Soviet Union’s collapse, noting how the shift to a market-driven economy introduced new constraints—such as ratings and commercial pressures—that replaced state censorship but posed different challenges for artistic freedom.

Several prominent Soviet and Russian animators are interviewed in the film, offering first-hand accounts of their creative processes and working conditions under state control. Notable figures include:

- Yuri Norstein, widely regarded as one of the greatest animators in history, known for Hedgehog in the Fog and Tale of Tales, which was named “The Best Animation Film of All Times and Nations” at the 1983 Arts Olympics in Los Angeles.
- Fyodor Khitruk, a pioneering director at Soyuzmultfilm, known for his Winnie-the-Pooh trilogy and The Story of a Crime.
- Garry Bardin, an acclaimed satirical animator.
- Eduard Nazarov, Aleksandr Tatarskiy, and Iosif Boyarsky, all significant contributors to Soviet and post-Soviet animation.
- Iosif Boyarsky, widely regarded as one of the key figures in Soviet model animation.
- Aleksandr Tatarskiy, who pioneered claymation in the Soviet Union and co-founded Pilot, the first independent private animation studio in post-Soviet Russia

The documentary includes studio visits and rare glimpses into ongoing projects, such as a brief clip from Norstein’s long-in-development film The Overcoat.

== Production ==
Magia Russica was an independent, self-funded project. The directors, Yonathan and Masha Zur, used their wedding funds to finance a four-week shooting schedule in Moscow in spring 2003. Yonathan handled cinematography and sound, while Masha conducted interviews. Winter footage was shot by Moscow-based cameraman Anton Michalev. The film took two years to complete and was made without institutional sponsorship or broadcaster support, reflecting its grassroots, “almost underground” production style.

For a film made in an almost underground manner, Magia Russica was received warmly by different kinds of audiences around the world. It was chosen as a main program for the 2006 international ASIFA day. The film was screened in 45 film festivals, animation festivals and documentary film festivals around the globe; released on DVD in the United States, Japan, France and Israel; and broadcast in different countries (8 Channel Israel, YLE Finland, Vouli Tileorasi - Greek Parliament TV, ETV Estonia, Canal+ Poland, Telewizja Polska - TVP Poland).
