= Moydodyr =

1923 poem by Korney Chukovsky

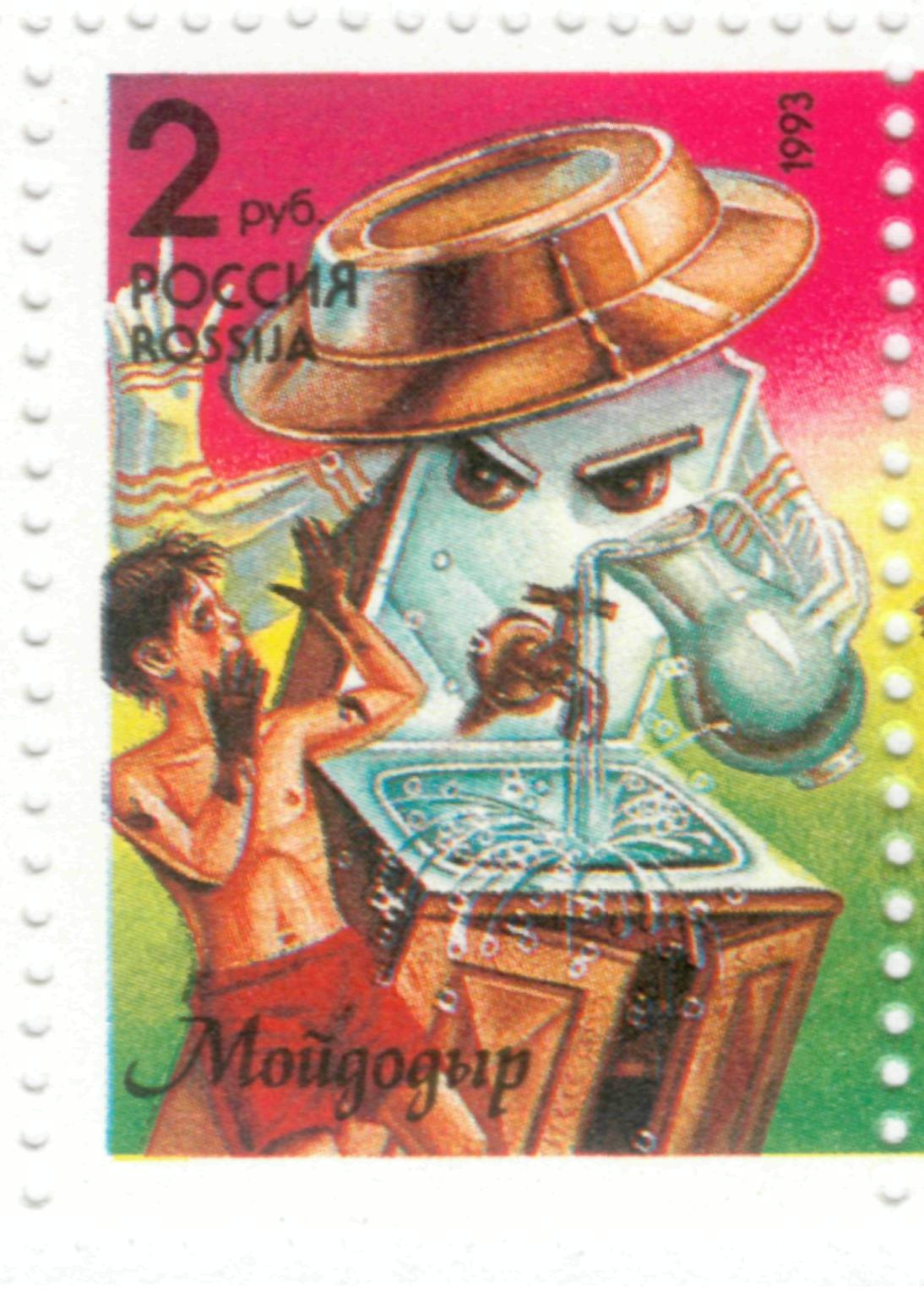
Moidodyr shown on Russian postage stamp. 1993

Moydodyr (Russian: Мойдоды́р) is a 1923 fairy tale poem for children about a magical creature of the same name by Korney Chukovsky. The name "Moy do dyr" is literally translated as "Wash 'til Holes"; the common English translation is "Wash 'Em Clean".

== Plot summary ==
The poem is about a little boy who does not want to wash. He gets so dirty that all his toys, clothes and other possessions decide to magically leave him. Suddenly, from the boy's mother's bedroom appears Moydodyr—an anthropomorphic washstand. He claims to be the chief of all washstands, soap bars, and sponges. He scolds the boy and calls his soap bars and sponges to wash him. The boy tries to run away, chased by a vicious sponge. The chase is described as happening on Petrograd streets. Finally they meet Crocodile, who swallows the sponge and becomes angry with the boy for being so dirty. Scolded by Crocodile, the boy goes back to Moydodyr and washes himself. The poem ends with a moralistic note to children on the virtue of hygiene.

== Adaptations ==
- Moydodyr (1927 film): a 9-minute stop-motion film directed by Mariya Benderskaya.. In January 2026 a copy of the film with Czech intertitles was digitized by Gosfilmofond upon a request of Lost Media Wiki and uploaded to YouTube.
- Moydodyr (1939 film) an animated short film directed by Ivan Ivanov-Vano produced by Soyuzmultfilm .
- Moydodyr (1954 film) an animated opera film also directed by Ivan Ivanov-Vano And it was produced by the same company Who did the 1939 Adaptation. The opera score music of the film, was composed by Yuri Levitin and then was released on vinyl by record company Melodiya in 1988.

== Influence in culture ==
There are statues of Moydodyr in Sokolniki Park, Moscow (2012) (55.795054°N 37.666111°E), its twin in Kazan (2013), in Novopolotsk, Belarus (55°31′33.37″N 28°39′59.27″E), in Noginsk. In 2008 a monument to Moydodyr-mommy with Moydodyr-baby was installed in Novgorod.

== Gallery ==
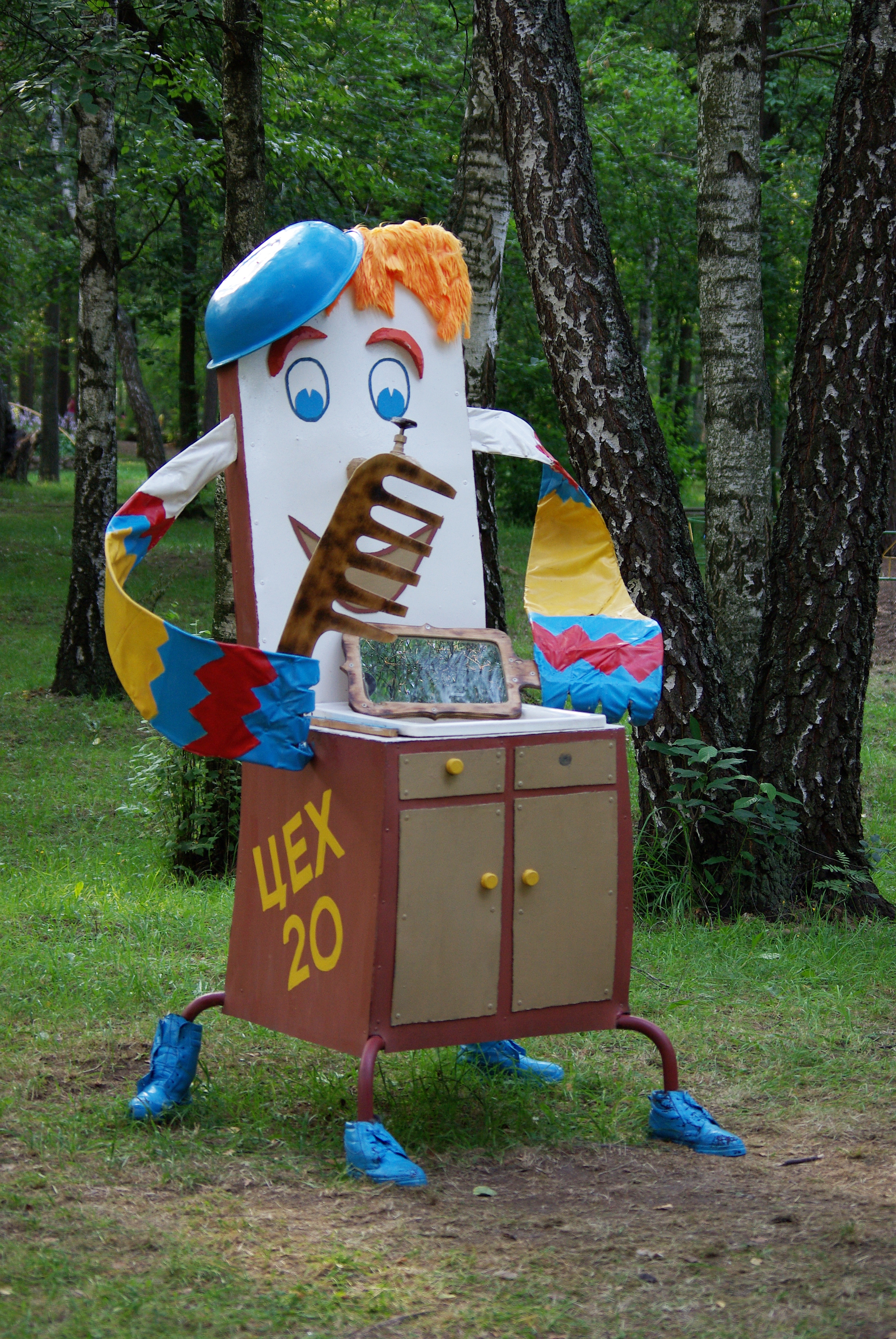
Moydodyr in Children's Park in Novopolotsk

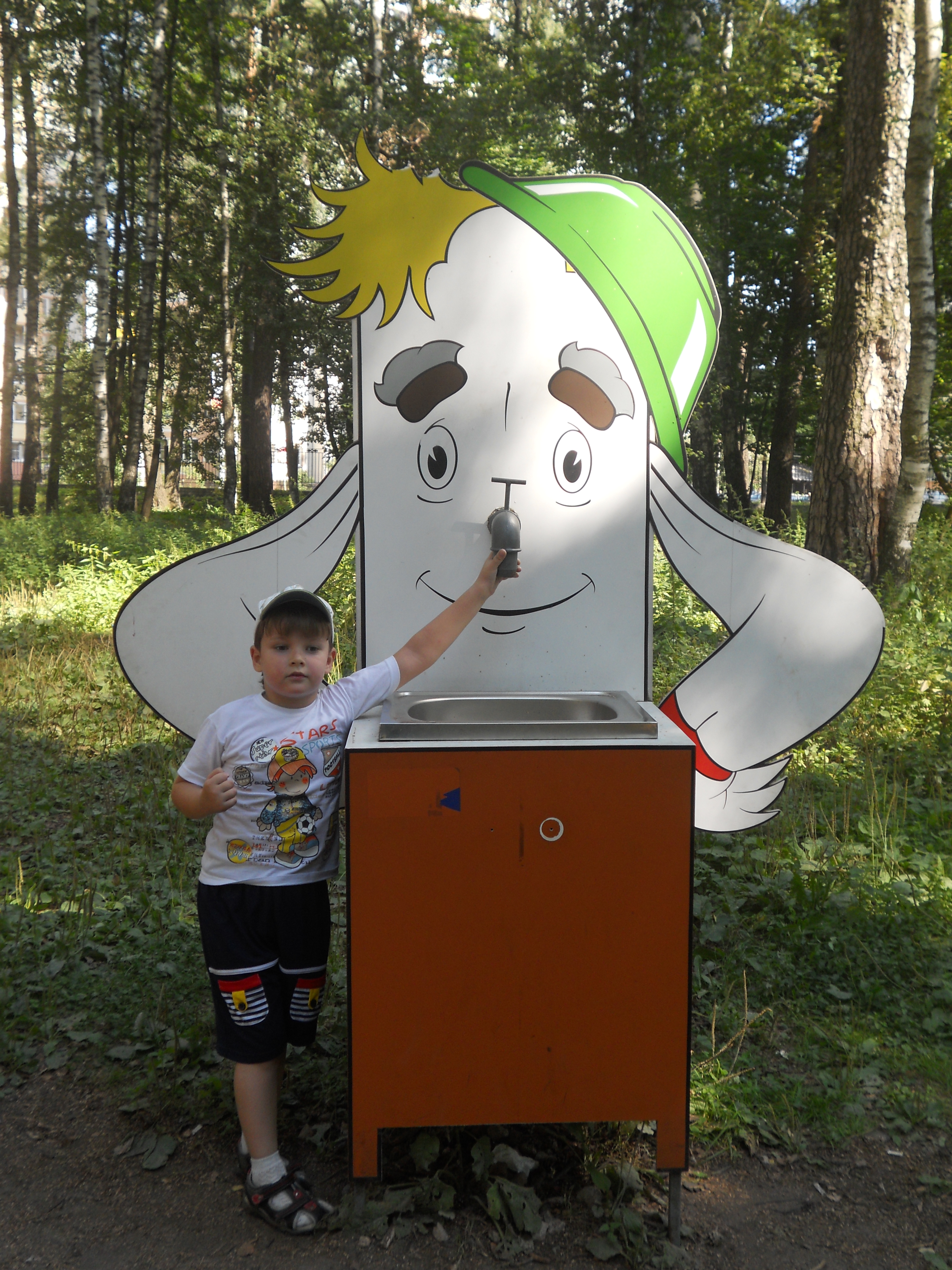
Moydodyr in Noginsk

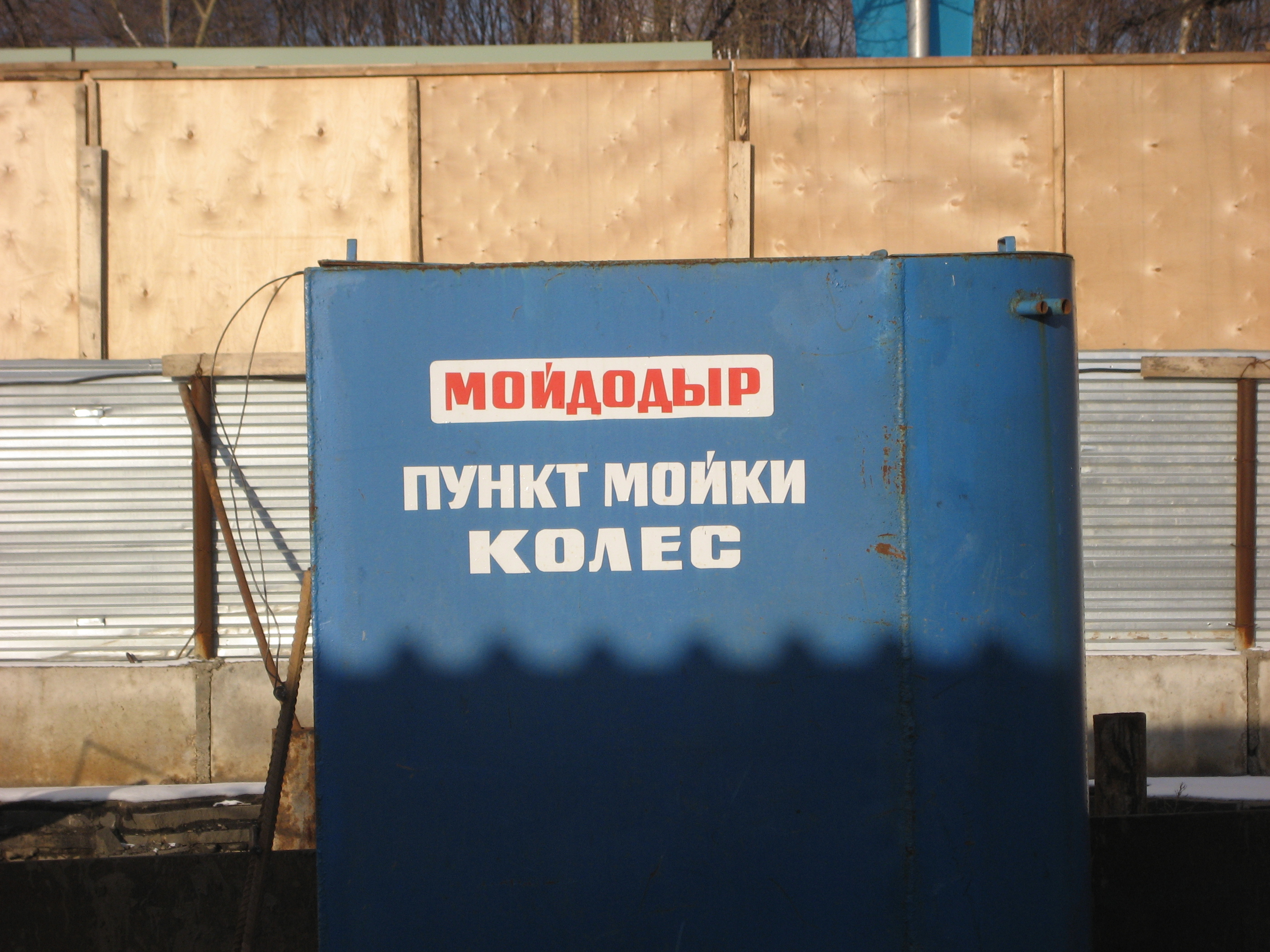
Tyre wash service "Moydodyr"
