= Tale of Tales (1979 film) =

1979 animated film by Yuri Norstein

- Little Grey Wolf from Tale of Tales
- Directed by: Yuri Norstein
- Written by: Lyudmila Petrushevskaya; Yuri Norstein
- Produced by: Soyuzmultfilm
- Starring: Alexander Kalyagin
- Cinematography: Igor Skidan-Bossin
- Edited by: Nadezhda Treshcheva; Natalya Abramova
- Music by: Mikhail Meyerovich; Johann Sebastian Bach; Wolfgang Amadeus Mozart
- Release date: 5 January 1979
- Running time: 29 minutes
- Country: Soviet Union
- Language: Russian

Tale of Tales (Russian: Сказка сказок, Skazka skazok) is a 1979 Soviet/Russian animated film directed by Yuri Norstein and produced by the Soyuzmultfilm studio in Moscow. Having won numerous awards, acclaimed by both critics and animators, various polls have recognized it as the greatest animated film of all time. The film was analyzed in the 2005 book Yuri Norstein and Tale of Tales: An Animator's Journey by Clare Kitson.

== Plot ==
Tale of Tales, like Andrei Tarkovsky's Mirror, attempts to structure itself like a human memory. Memories are not recalled in neat chronological order; instead, they are recalled by the association of one thing to another, which means that any attempt to put memory on film cannot be told like a conventional narrative. The film is thus made up of a series of related sequences whose scenes are interspersed between each other. One of the primary themes involves war, with particular emphasis on the enormous losses the Soviet Union suffered on the Eastern Front during World War II. Several recurring characters and their interactions make up a large part of the film, such as the poet, the little girl and the bull, the little boy and the crows, the dancers and the soldiers, the train, the apples and especially the little grey wolf (Russian: се́ренький волчо́к, syeryenkiy volchok).

Yuri Norstein wrote in Iskusstvo Kino magazine that the film is "about simple concepts that give you the strength to live."

== Music and poetry ==
In addition to the original score composed by Mikhail Meyerovich, this film makes use of several other pieces of music. Excerpts from works by Bach (notably the E flat minor Prelude BWV 853 (from The Well-Tempered Clavier)) and Mozart (the Andante second movement from Piano Concerto No. 4 in G major, K41) are used, and the World War II era tango Weary Sun, written by Jerzy Petersburski, features prominently. However, the most important musical inspiration is the following traditional Russian lullaby, which is included in the film in both instrumental and vocal form.

Russian

Баю-баюшки-баю,
Не ложися на краю.
Придёт серенький волчок,
Он ухватит за бочок
И утащит во лесок
Под ракитовый кусток.

Transliteration

Bayu-bayushki-bayu,
Ne lozhisya na krayu.
Pridyot serenkiy volchok,
On ukhvatit za bochok
I utashchit vo lesok
Pod rakitovy kustok.

English translation

Baby, baby, rock-a-bye
On the edge you mustn't lie
Or the little grey wolf will come
And will nip you on the tum,
Tug you off into the wood
Underneath the willow-root.

Many situations in the film actually derive from this lullaby, as well as the character of the little grey wolf. Indeed, the film's original title (rejected by the Soviet censors) was The Little Grey Wolf Will Come.

The name Tale of Tales came from a poem of the same name by Turkish poet Nazım Hikmet that Norstein loved since 1962.

Russian

Стоим над водой -
солнце, кошка, чинара, я
и наша судьба.
Вода прохладная,
Чинара высокая,
Солнце светит,
Кошка дремлет,
Я стихи сочиняю.
Слава Богу, живем!..

Transliteration

Stoim nad vodoy -
solntse, koshka, chinara, ya
i nasha sud'ba.
Voda prochladnaya,
Chinara vysokaya,
Solntse svyetit,
Koshka dryemlyet,
Ya stihi sochinyayu
Slava Bogu, zhivyom!..

English translation

We stand above the water -
sun, cat, plane tree, me
and our destiny.
The water is cool,
The plane tree is tall,
The sun is shining,
The cat is dozing,
I write verses.
Thank God, we live!..

== Awards ==
- 1980—Lille (France) International Festival of Films: Jury Grand Prize
- 1980—Zagreb World Festival of Animated Films: Grand Prize
- 1980—Ottawa (Canada) International Animation Festival: Best Film Longer Than Three Minutes Award
- 1984—Los Angeles Olympic Arts Festival: voted by large international jury to be the greatest animated film of all time
- 2002—Zagreb World Festival of Animated Films: again voted by large international jury to be the greatest animated film of all time

== Creators ==
Role	Name
Director	Yuri Norstein (Ю́рий Норште́йн)
Writers	Lyudmila Petrushevskaya (Людми́ла Петруше́вская) Yuri Norstein (Юрий Норштейн)
Art Director	Franchesca Yarbusova (Франче́ска Ярбусова)
Animator	Yuri Norstein (Ю́рий Норште́йн)
Camera Operator	Igor Skidan-Bossin (И́горь Скидан-Босин)
Executive Producer	G. Kovrov (Г. Ковро́в)
Composer	Mikhail Meyerovich (Михаи́л Мееро́вич)
Sound Operator	Boris Filchikov (Бори́с Фильчико́в)
Script Editor	Natalya Abramova (Ната́лья Абрамова)
Voice Actor	Alexander Kalyagin (Алекса́ндр Каля́гин) as Little Grey Wolf
Film Editor	Nadezhda Treshcheva (Наде́жда Трещёва)

== In popular culture ==
Australian electronic duo The Presets paid homage to Tale of Tales in the music video for their song "Girl and the Sea" from their album Beams.

== See also ==
- History of Russian animation
- List of films considered the best
- List of films based on poems
- List of stop-motion films
- Hedgehog in the Fog, another Yuri Norstein film from 1975
- Arthouse animation
