= Lev Milchin =

Soviet animation director, art director, artist and book illustrator

- Born: Lev Isaakovich Milchin; August 18, 1920; Minsk, SSR of Byelorussia
- Died: June 28, 1987 (aged 66); Moscow, Soviet Union
- Occupation: Animator

Lev Isaakovich Milchin (Russian: Лев Исаакович Мильчин, 1920—1987) was a Soviet animation director, art director, artist and book illustrator. He was also a pedagogue at VGIK. He was named an Honoured Artist of the RSFSR in 1978.

== Biography ==
Lev Milchin was born into the family of the Soviet artist of Jewish origin Isaak Iosifovich Milchin. He graduated from the Minsk art school, then finished a newly opened art faculty at VGIK led by Ivan Ivanov-Vano.

During the Great Patriotic War, Milchin joined Narodnoe Opolcheniye, then worked at CIFS (Almaty) in evacuation as an artist on several movies. After the war he joined Soyuzmultfilm where he contributed to stop-motion and traditionally animated movies both as an art director and a director. Among his collaborators were Ivan Ivanov-Vano, Alexandra Snezhko-Blotskaya, Mikhail Tsekhanovsky, the Brumberg sisters and others.

Milchin also worked at Mosfilm as an art director. His filmography includes Sampo (1959) by Aleksandr Ptushko, Michman Panin (1960) by Mikhail Shveitser, My Younger Brother (1962) by Aleksandr Zarkhi, Maria, Mirabela (1981) by Ion Popescu-Gopo and other titles. He also taught art at VGIK, illustrated books and served as a member of ASIFA.

Milchin died on 28 June 1987, a few months after his friend and teacher Ivan Ivanov-Vano. He was buried in Moscow at the Mitinskoe Cemetery (site 126). He was survived by his wife Tamara Vladimirovna Poletika (1922—2011), an animator.

== Filmography ==
Art director:

- The Humpbacked Horse (1947)
- The Little Flower with Seven Colours (1948)
- Geese-Swans (1949)
- A Strange Voice (1949)
- The Tale of the Dead Tsarevna and the Seven Bogatyrs (1951)
- Tsarevna the Frog (1954)
- The Enchanted Boy (1955)
- The Helping-out Stick (1956)
- Fulfillment of Desires (1957)
- My Younger Brother (1962)
- The Glowworm №3 (1963)
- The Pig-Money-Box (1963)
- Zhu-Zhu-Zhu (1966)
- An Alarm Clock (1967)
- Adventures of the Baron Munchausen (1967)
- The Comedian (1968)
- Brave Robin Hood (1970)
- Stories of the Old Sailor. Antarctica (1972)
- Health Begins at Home (1973)
- The Humpbacked Horse (1975)
- The Steadfast Tin Soldier (1976)
- How Masha Quarreled with a Pillow (1977)
- Masha isn't a Lazy Girl Anymore (1978)
- Metamorphosis (1978)
- New Aladdin (1979)
- Maria, Mirabela (1981)
- The Tale of Tsar Saltan (1984)
- The Cock and Boyarin (1986)

Director:

- The Glowworm №3 (1963)
- The Pig-Money-Box (1963)
- Allowed and Not Allowed (1964)
- Hello, Atom! (1965)
- Zhu-Zhu-Zhu (1966)
- Today is Birthday (1966)
- An Alarm Clock (1967)
- The Glowworm №8 (1968)
- Grandmother's Umbrella (1969)
- Stories of the Old Sailor. Extraordinary Travel (1970)
- Stories of the Old Sailor. Desert Island (1971)
- Stories of the Old Sailor. Antarctica (1972)
- The Steadfast Tin Soldier (1976)
- How Masha Quarreled with a Pillow (1977)
- Masha isn't a Lazy Girl Anymore (1978)
- Masha and the Magic Jam (1979)
- The Tale of Tsar Saltan (1984)
- The Cucumber Horse (1985)
- The Cock and Boyarin (1986)
