= List of joint Japanese–Soviet films =

There have been about a dozen joint Soviet-Japanese films shot since the 1960s.

Year	English title	Japanese title	Russian title	Directors	Studio	Notes
1966	The Little Fugitive	Chiisai Tōbōsha (小さい逃亡者)	Маленький беглец (Malenkiy beglets)	Eduard Bocharov; Teinosuke Kinugasa	Gorki Film Studio; Daiei Studios	
1974	Moscow, My Love	Mosukuwa waga ai (モスクワわが愛)	Москва, любовь моя (Moskva, luybov moya)	Alexander Mitta; Kenji Yoshida	Toho Company; Mosfilm	
1975	Dersu Uzala	Derusu uzāra (デルス・ウザーラ)	Дерсу Узала	Akira Kurosawa	Daiei Studios; Mosfilm; Atelier 41	
1976	Melodies of the White Night	Byakuya no shirabe (白夜の調べ)	Мелодия белой ночи (Melodiya beloy nochi)	Kiyoshi Nishimura; Sergei Solovyov	Toho Company; Mosfilm	
1979	The Way to Medals	Yomigaere majo (甦れ魔女)	Путь к медалям (Put k medalyam)	Nikita Orlov; Junya Sato	Toei Company; Mosfilm	
1986	Adventures of Lolo the Penguin, Film 1	Chiisana pengin roro no bōken (小さなペンギンロロの冒険)	Приключения пингвинёнка Лоло (Priklyucheniya pingvinyonka Lolo, Vypusk 1)	Gennady Sokolsky; Kinjiro Yoshida	Soyuzmultfilm	animation
1987	Adventures of Lolo the Penguin, Film 2	Chiisana pengin roro no bōken (小さなペンギンロロの冒険)	Приключения пингвинёнка Лоло (Priklyucheniya pingvinyonka Lolo, Vypusk 2)	Gennady Sokolsky; Kinjiro Yoshida	Soyuzmultfilm	animation
1987	Adventures of Lolo the Penguin, Film 3	Chiisana pengin roro no bōken (小さなペンギンロロの冒険)	Приключения пингвинёнка Лоло (Priklyucheniya pingvinyonka Lolo, Vypusk 3)	Gennady Sokolsky; Kinjiro Yoshida	Soyuzmultfilm	animation
1989	A Step		Шаг (Shag)			
1990	Under the Aurora	Ōrora no shita de (オーロラの下で)	Под северным сиянием (Pod severnym siyaniyem)	Toshio Gotō; Sergei Vronsky; Petras Abukiavicus	Toei Company; Kobushi Productions; Ritm; Asahi Television News	
1992	Dreams of Russia	O-roshiya-koku suimu-tan (おろしや国酔夢譚)	Сны о России (Sny o Rossii)	Junya Sato	Toho Company; Daiei Studios	

Also, during the Khrushchev Thaw, the Ten Thousand Boys film, "the first image of friendly Japanese on the Soviet screen", was shot in Soviet Union under Russian and Japanese directors, with active participations of Japanese residing in Moscow.
