= The Steadfast Tin Soldier (1976 film) =

- Directed by: Lev Milchin
- Written by: Alla Akhundova
- Starring: Maria Vinogradova; Aleksey Konsovsky; Sergey Zeitz
- Cinematography: Mikhail Druyan
- Edited by: Olga Vasilenko
- Music by: Yan Frenkel
- Production company: Soyuzmultfilm
- Release date: August 15, 1976
- Running time: 18 min.
- Country: USSR
- Language: Russian

The Steadfast Tin Soldier (Russian: Сто́йкий оловя́нный солда́тик, romanized: Stoikiy olovyannyy soldatik) is a 1976 Soviet animated film, adaptation of the fairy tale by Hans Christian Andersen, created by Soyuzmultfilm Studio.

== Cast ==
- Maria Vinogradova as tin soldier
- Aleksey Konsovsky as narrator
- Sergey Zeitz as troll / rat

The song in the film is performed by Elena Kamburova.
