= The Battle of Kerzhenets =

- Title card
- Directed by: Yuri Norstein; Ivan Ivanov-Vano
- Written by: Ivan Ivanov-Vano
- Produced by: Soyuzmultfilm
- Music by: Rimsky-Korsakov
- Release date: January 1, 1971 (USSR)
- Running time: 10 min 12 sec
- Country: USSR
- Language: Russian

The Battle of Kerzhenets (Russian: Сеча при Керженце; tr.: Secha pri Kerzhentse) is a 1971 Soviet animated film directed by Ivan Ivanov-Vano and Yuri Norstein. The film is set to music by Rimsky-Korsakov and uses Russian frescoes and paintings from the 14th–16th centuries. These are animated using 2-dimensional stop motion animation.

== Plot ==
The story is based on the legend of the Invisible City of Kitezh (made into a 4-act opera by Rimsky-Korsakov in 1907), which disappears under the waters of a lake to escape an attack by the Mongols. (Russia was under the Mongol-Tartar yoke for a period of three centuries in the Middle Ages.)

The film itself follows the legend only loosely, however, and its highpoint is a battle between the Russian soldiers and the Mongol hordes, symbolizing a clash of cultures (the Virgin Mary appears early in the film, in effect watching over the Russian side of the battle).

== Awards ==
- 1971—Karlovy Vary International Film Festival: Prize for Best Animated Film
- 1972—Zagreb World Festival of Animated Films: Grand Prize
- 1972—Tbilisi: Prize for Best Animated Film
- 1972—Bombay Film Festival: "Diplom"

== Creators ==
Role	Name
Directors	Yuri Norstein (Юрий Норштейн); Ivan Ivanov-Vano (Иван Иванов-Вано)
Writer	Ivan Ivanov-Vano (Иван Иванов-Вано)
Art directors	Marina Sokolova (Марина Соколова); Arkadiy Tyurin (Аркадий Тюрин)
Animators	Yuri Norstein (Юрий Норштейн); Aleksandr Rozhkov (Александр Рожков); Boris Saavin (Борис Савин); Vyacheslav Shilobreyev (Вячеслав Шилобреев)
Camera operator	Vladimir Saruhanov (Владимир Саруханов)
Composer	Nikolai Andreyevich Rimsky-Korsakov (Николай Андреевич Римский-Корсаков)
Sound operator	Boris Filchikov (Борис Фильчиков)

== See also ==
- History of Russian animation
- List of stop-motion films
