= Hedgehog in the Fog =

1975 Soviet film

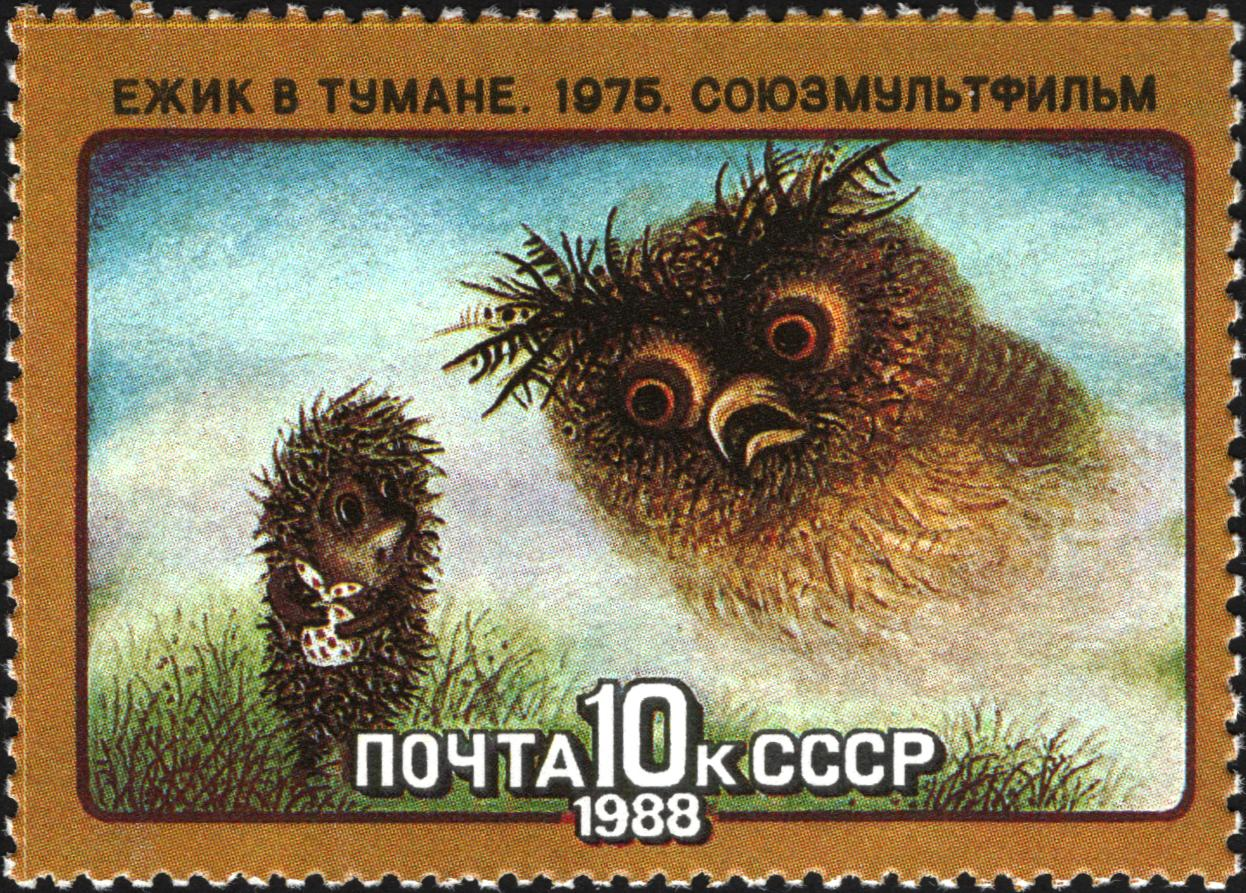
- Hedgehog in the Fog on the 1988 USSR stamp
- Directed by: Yuri Norstein
- Written by: Sergei Kozlov
- Story by: Sergei Kozlov
- Produced by: Soyuzmultfilm
- Starring: Aleksey Batalov; Maria Vinogradova; Vyacheslav Nevinny
- Narrated by: Aleksey Batalov
- Cinematography: Aleksandr Zhukovsky
- Edited by: Nadezhda Treshchyova
- Music by: Mikhail Meyerovich
- Layouts by: Francheska Yarbusova
- Production company: Soyuzmultfilm
- Release date: October 23, 1975
- Running time: 10 min. 29 s.
- Country: Soviet Union
- Language: Russian

Hedgehog in the Fog (Russian: Ёжик в тума́не, romanized: Yózhik v tumáne, IPA: [ˈjɵʐɨk f tʊˈmanʲɪ]) is a 1975 Soviet animated film directed by Yuri Norstein and produced by the Soyuzmultfilm studio in Moscow. The Russian script was written by Sergei Grigoryevich Kozlov, who also published a book under the same name.

In 2006, Norstein published a book titled Hedgehog in the Fog, listing himself as an author alongside Kozlov.

== Plot ==
The Hedgehog (voiced by Maria Vinogradova) goes to visit his friend the Bear Cub to drink tea with raspberry jam and count the stars. The road along which the Hedgehog moves passes through deserted fields and forest thickets. The Hedgehog spots an impressive white horse in the evening fog and approaches. Within the fog, the world is mysterious and outlandish images appear before the Hedgehog. Among them is an eagle-owl looking into a well, a snail suddenly turning into an elephant and a bat with a frightening wingspan. The Hedgehog realises he has lost his jam and panics, until it is returned by a dog.

Through the fog, the voice of the Bear Cub is periodically heard calling out to the Hedgehog. Hurrying to answer the call, the hero falls into the river. His savior is a mysterious "someone" who takes the Hedgehog to the shore. Having finally arrived at the Bear Cub's house, Hedgehog listens to his friend (voiced by Vyacheslav Nevinny), who says that he has already heated up the samovar on the porch for evening tea, collected juniper branches "so that there is smoke", and moved the wicker chairs to be more comfortable. He remarks that the Hedgehog is the only one he can really count the stars with.

== Art direction ==
The production designer of the film "Hedgehog in the Fog" was Norstein's wife, Francesca Yarbusova. The marriage of two creative people, according to the director, not only helps, but also hinders creativity: "She does not keep up with my reactivity, my demanding nature, and it seems to me that she is lazy and cannot bring herself to the necessary state." Yarbusova, in turn, said that when starting work on "The Hedgehog ...", Norstein planned to shoot an uncomplicated fairy tale. However, instead of the supposed lightness, it turned out to be a "harsh" experiment, during which many techniques were used for the first time. So, water was placed in the leaves drawn by Yarbusova using a projector, which, in order to achieve a uniform image texture, was processed with strokes. The artist has been working on the image of a Hedgehog for the longest time. Other characters had already been drawn, the scenery had been designed, filming had begun, but the main character did not work out. The understanding of what the key character should be arose during the couple's evening walk, when they saw a woman with a tame hedgehog on the street. Upon returning home, Yarbusova drew the character with one line, and he immediately gained "inner clarity." In order to achieve the "childish expressiveness" of the image, the director tied Francesca's right hand, and the Hedgehog was created with her left hand.

== Creators ==
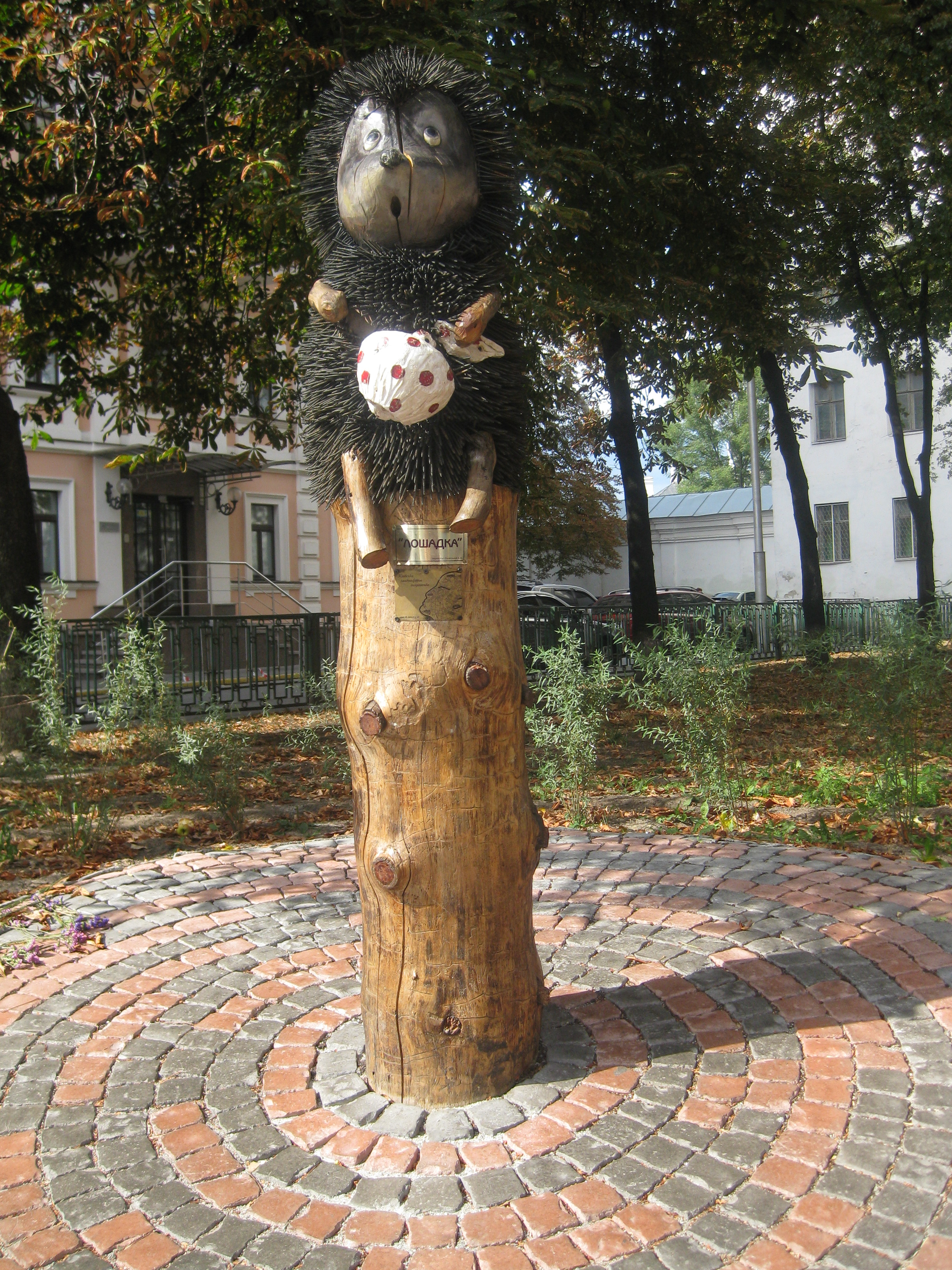
Statue of the film's protagonist in Kyiv

Role	Name
Director	Yuri Norstein (Ю́рий Норште́йн)
Writer	Sergei Kozlov (Серге́й Козло́в)
Art director	Francheska Yarbusova (Франче́ска Я́рбусова)
Animator	Yuri Norstein (Ю́рий Норште́йн)
Camera operator	Aleksandr Zhukovsky (Алекса́ндр Жуко́вский)
Composer	Mikhail Meyerovich (Михаи́л Мееро́вич)
Sound operator	Boris Filchikov (Бори́с Фи́льчиков)
Script editor	Natalya Abramova (Ната́лья Абра́мова)
Voice actors	Aleksey Batalov (Алексе́й Бата́лов) Narrator (Расска́зчик, Rasskáztchik); Maria Vinogradova (Мари́я Виногра́дова) Hedgehog (Ёжик, Yózhik); Vyacheslav Nevinny (Вячесла́в Неви́нный) Bear-Cub (Медвежо́нок, Medvezhónok)
Film editor	Nadezhda Treshchyova (Наде́жда Трещёва)

== Awards ==
- 1976—Frunze – All-Union Film Festival: Hedgehog in the Fog: "best animated film"
- 1976—Tehran – Children's and Youth Film Festival: Hedgehog in the Fog: "best animated film"
- 2003—Tokyo — Laputa Animation Festival – 150 best animations of all time: Hedgehog in the Fog: "No. 1 animated film of all time"

== Production ==
The fog effects were created by putting a very thin piece of paper on top of the scene and slowly lifting it up toward the camera frame-by-frame until everything behind it became blurry and white.

== Role in Soviet animation ==
Soviet-era children's animation and literature was faced with the task of producing politically acceptable content. Anthropologist Serguei Oushakine (Sergey Ushakin) recognizes this atmosphere of indefinite deferment in the animation, stating: "The main thing is the work of imagination, or more precisely, the terror and pleasure with which it is linked. The final scene of pleasure, to which these various phantasmal and/or realistic experiences should indeed have led, is not included in the plot." This is evident through the hedgehog's anxiety and fixation on the horse, even after he succeeds in meeting the bear for tea.

== Legacy ==
The coin's silver iteration

An English dub of the film was made for Channel 4 in the United Kingdom for Christmas in 1998.

Hedgehog in the Fog was ranked No. 1 in a poll at the 2003 Laputa Animation Festival where 140 animators from around the world voted for the best animated films of all time.

Hayao Miyazaki, animator of Studio Ghibli, stated that he drew his inspiration from many animators including Yuri Norstein (a framed portrait of the owl from the film is included at the Ghibli Museum).

Until 2025, the main character (the Hedgehog) from the film had a statue in the city center of Kyiv, the capital of Ukraine, built in January 2009.

The opening ceremonies for the 2014 Winter Olympics referenced this work, mentioning it in a list of signature Russian accomplishments and artists, including Fyodor Dostoevsky, Leo Tolstoy, and Sputnik.

In 2024, the Bank of Russia issued three coins commemorating to the film as part of the "Russian (Soviet) Animation" series: one silver coin with a face value of 3 rubles, and two made of nickel-plated steel and a copper-nickel alloy with a colored coating, with a face value of 25 rubles. Norstein spoke negatively of the commemoration, writing that it was "an unprecedented case of theft and plagiarism. The main thief is a certain Yuliana Yuryevna Slascheva, head of Soyuzmultfilm LLC, and the plagiarism of Francesca Yarbusova's design, at the behest of the aforementioned thief, was committed in England by some incompetent individual who understands nothing about graphics, painting, or nature".

== See also ==
- History of Russian animation
- List of films voted the best
- List of stop motion films
