= Yuri Norstein =

Russian animator (born 1941)

- Юрий Норштейн
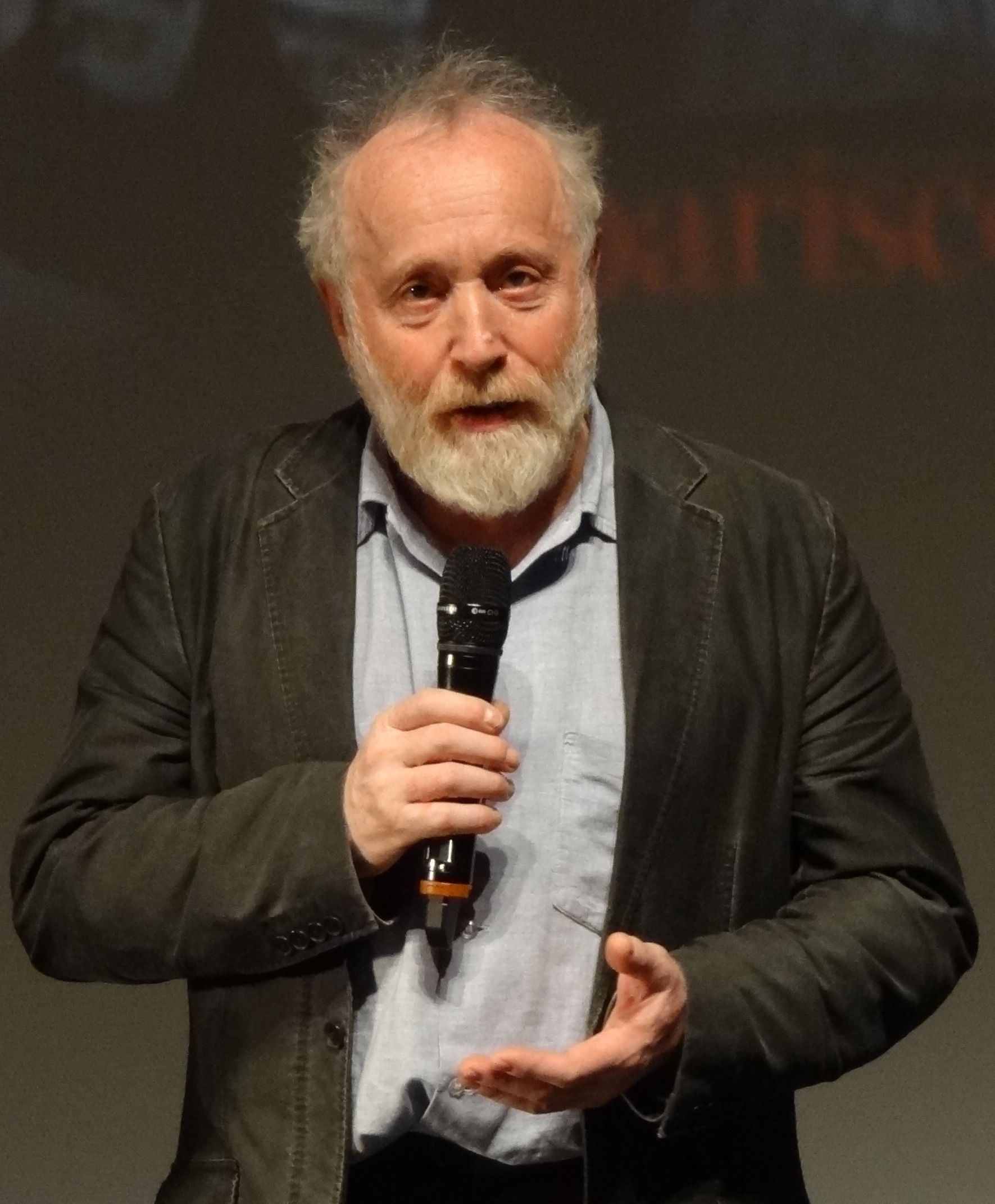
- Norstein in 2012
- Born: 15 September 1941 (age 85); Andreyevka, Russian SFSR, Soviet Union
- Occupations: Animator; filmmaker
- Years active: 1962–present
- Spouse: Francheska Yarbusova

Yuri Borisovich Norstein (Russian: Юрий Борисович Норштейн; born 15 September 1941) is a Russian animator best known for his animated shorts Hedgehog in the Fog and Tale of Tales made in collaboration with his wife, Francheska Yarbusova. Since 1981, he has been working on a feature film called The Overcoat, based on the short story by Nikolai Gogol of the same name. According to The Washington Post, "he is considered by many to be not just the best animator of his era, but the best of all time".

== Life and career ==
=== Childhood and early life ===
Yuri Norstein was born to a Jewish family in the village of Andreyevka (in present-day Pachelmsky District, Penza Oblast) during his parents' World War II evacuation. He grew up in the Maryina Roshcha District of Moscow. After studying at an art school, Norstein initially found work at a furniture factory. Then he finished a two-year animation course and found employment at studio Soyuzmultfilm in 1961. The first film that he participated in as an animator was Who Said "Meow"? (1962).

Hedgehog in the Fog (1975), one of Norstein's most widely known works

=== Film career ===
After working as an animation artist in some fifty films, Norstein got the chance to direct his own. In 1968, he debuted with 25th October, the First Day, sharing directorial credit with Arkadiy Tyurin. The film used the artwork of 1920s-era Soviet artists Nathan Altman and Kuzma Petrov-Vodkin.

The next film in which he had a major role was The Battle of Kerzhenets (1971), a co-production with Russian animation director Ivan Ivanov-Vano under whose direction Norstein had earlier worked on 1969's Times of the Year.

Throughout the 1970s Norstein continued to work as an animator in many films, and also directed several. As the decade progressed his animation style became ever more sophisticated, looking less like flat cut-outs and more like smoothly-moving paintings or sophisticated pencil sketches. His most famous film is Tale of Tales, a non-linear, autobiographical film about growing up in the postwar Soviet world.

Norstein uses a special technique in his animation, involving multiple glass planes to give his animation a three-dimensional look. The camera is placed at the top looking down on a series of glass planes about a meter deep (one every 25–30 cm). The individual glass planes can move horizontally as well as toward and away from the camera (to give the effect of a character moving closer or further away).

For many years, he has collaborated with his wife, the artist Francheska Yarbusova, and the cinematographer Aleksandr Zhukovskiy. He met Francheska when he was studying at the Moscow Art School. She became his most loyal collaborator. Together they created the famous Hedgehog in the Fog (1975) and Tale of Tales. Tale of Tales was voted the best animated film of all time at the Animated Olympics, held during the 1984 Summer Olympics in Los Angeles.

Throughout the late 1970s and early 1980s, Norstein's animations were showered with both state and international awards. Then, in a bitter twist of irony, he was fired from Soyuzmultfilm in 1985 for working too slowly on his latest film, a (presumably) feature-length adaptation of Gogol's The Overcoat. By that time he had been working on it with his usual small team of three people for two years and had finished ten minutes.

In April 1993, Norstein and three other leading animators (Fyodor Khitruk, Andrei Khrzhanovsky, and Eduard Nazarov) founded the Animation School and Studio (SHAR Studio) in Russia. The Russian Cinema Committee is among the share-holders of the studio.

To this day, Norstein is still working on The Overcoat – his ardent perfectionism has earned him the nickname "The Golden Snail". The project has met numerous financial troubles and false starts, but Norstein has said that it currently has reliable funding from several sources, both from within and outside of Russia. At least 25 minutes have been completed to date. A couple of short, low-resolution clips have been made available to the public. The first 20 minutes of the film have also toured among various exhibits of Norstein's work in Russian museums. The full film is expected to be 65 minutes long.

=== Books ===
Norstein wrote an essay for a book by Giannalberto Bendazzi about the pinscreen animator Alexander Alexeïeff titled Alexeïeff: Itinerary of a Master.

In 2005, he released a Russian-language book titled Snow on the Grass. Fragments of a Book. Lectures about the Art of Animation, featuring a number of lectures that he gave about the art of animation. That same year, he was invited as "guest animator" to work on Kihachirō Kawamoto's puppet-animated feature film, The Book of the Dead.

On 10 August 2008, the full version of the book Snow on the Grass was released (the "incomplete" 2005 book was 248 pages). The book, which was printed in the Czech Republic and funded by Sberbank, consists of two volumes, 620 pages, and 1700 color illustrations. The studio stopped working on The Overcoat for nearly a year while Norstein worked to release the book.

== Political views ==
Norstein has been an outspoken critic of the Russian government. He voiced his opposition to the conviction of the band Pussy Riot and voiced his concerns over the death of Sergei Magnitsky in prison after he had exposed corruption within the government.

Despite supporting the 2014 Russian annexation of Crimea, he was among 370 people in the Russian animation industry signing an open letter against the 2022 Russian invasion of Ukraine that was published in Novaya Gazeta shortly after the invasion began.

== Filmography ==
- The 25th, the First Day (25-e — первый день, 1968), in collaboration with Arkadiy Tyurin.
- Seasons (Времена года, 1969), in collaboration with Ivan Ivanov-Vano
- Children and Matches (Дети и спички, 1969)
- The Battle of Kerzhenets (Сеча при Керженце, 1971), in collaboration with Ivan Ivanov-Vano.
- The Fox and the Hare (Лиса и заяц, 1973).
- The Heron and the Crane (Цапля и журавль, 1974).
- Hedgehog in the Fog (Ёжик в тумане, 1975).
- Tale of Tales (Сказка сказок, 1979).
- Participated in Winter Days (冬の日; 2003).
- The Overcoat (Шинель, still in production).

== Releases ==
2K resolution transfers of the six theatrical shorts directed by Norstein by were made by the Japanese film laboratory Imagica. A touring programme of them was played in cinemas in Japan beginning in December 2016 and they were released on Blu-ray Disc there on 26 May 2017.

== Awards and honours ==
- 1971 – Karlovy Vary International Film Festival (Czechoslovakia): The Battle of Kerzhenets named Best Animated Film
- 1972 – Zagreb World Festival of Animated Films (Yugoslavia): Grand Prize for The Battle of Kerzhenets (shared with Ivan Ivanov-Vano)
- 1972 – Tbilisi: The Battle of Kerzhenets named Best Animated Film
- 1972 – Bombay Film Festival (India): "Diplom" for The Battle of Kerzhenets
- 1975 – Annecy International Animated Film Festival (France): Special Jury Prize for Heron and Crane
- 1975 – New York (U.S.): First Prize for Heron and Crane
- 1976 – Frunze All-Union Film Festival: Hedgehog in the Fog "best animated film"
- 1976 – Tehran Children's and Youth Film Festival (Iran): Hedgehog in the Fog "best animated film"
- 1977 – Odense (Denmark): Grand Prize for Heron and Crane
- 1979 – USSR State Prize for Tale of Tales (awarded just prior to its release to Norstein, Yarbusova, and Zhukovsky)
- 1980 – Lille International Festival of Films (France): Jury Grand Prize for Tale of Tales
- 1980 – Zagreb World Festival of Animated Films: Grand Prize for Tale of Tales
- 1980 – Ottawa International Animation Festival (Canada): Best Film Longer Than Three Minutes Award for Tale of Tales
- 1984 – Los Angeles Olympic Arts Festival (U.S.): Tale of Tales voted by large international jury to be the greatest animated film of all time
- 1991 – Annie Award for Distinguished Contribution to the Art of Animation
- 1995 – Russian Independent Triumph Award (acknowledging 'the highest achievements in art and literature')
- 1996 – People's Artist of Russia
- 1996 – 1st Open Russian Festival of Animated Film, Breakthrough Prize for Russian Sugar (commercial)
- 2002 – Zagreb World Festival of Animated Films: Tale of Tales again voted by large international jury to be the greatest animated film of all time
- 2004 – Japanese Order of the Rising Sun
- 2014 – Animafest Zagreb - World Festival of Animated Film: Lifetime Achievement Award

Hayao Miyazaki considers Norstein "a great artist" and cited Hedgehog in the Fog as one of his favourite animated films.

== Bibliography ==
- "Сказка сказок". Ю. Норштейн. Ф. Ярбусова. 2005, «Красная площадь». ISBN 5-900743-80-2
- "Снег на траве. Фрагменты книги. Лекции по искусству анимации". Ю. Норштейн. 2005. ISBN 5-87149-099-9
- "Ёжик в тумане". Юрий Норштейн, Сергей Козлов, Франческа Ярбусова (иллюстрации). 2006, «Красная площадь». ISBN 5-900743-91-8
- "Снег на траве". Ю. Норштейн. 2008, «Красная площадь». ISBN 978-5-91521-006-5

== See also ==
- Francheska Yarbusova
- History of Russian animation
- List of films voted the best
