= Animator.ru =

Website of the animation industry in Russia

- Website type: Online movie database
- Available in: Russian, English
- Website: animator.ru
- Commercial: no
- Registration: Russia
- Current status: active

Animator.ru is a Russian website chronicling the films, people and studios of the animation industry in Russia, the former Soviet Union and (to a lesser extent) the Commonwealth of Independent States (CIS). It also includes a forum, a news block, a photo-gallery and an animators labour exchange. The database is available in Russian and English, while the other sections are Russian-language only.

It was founded with the financial support of the Federal Agency on Press and Mass Communications of Russia.

Its earliest records come from 1912 (the films of Ladislas Starevich). Much of the information in it is not documented by bigger English-language film databases such as IMDb.

The website has a Yandex citing index of 1700.

== See also ==
- History of Russian animation
