= The Heron and the Crane =

- Russian: Цапля и журавль
- Directed by: Yuri Norstein
- Written by: Roman Kachanov
- Screenplay by: Yuri Norstein
- Music by: Mikhail Meerovich
- Production company: Soyuzmultfilm
- Release date: 1974
- Running time: 10 minutes
- Country: Soviet Union
- Language: Russian

The Heron and the Crane (Russian: Цапля и журавль, Tsaplya i zhuravl) is a 1974 10-minute Soviet/Russian animated film directed by Yuri Norstein and produced by the Soyuzmultfilm.

== Summary ==
Based on the folk tale about the unlucky never-ending courtship of the title characters (a male crane and a female heron, each changing their own minds).

== Cast ==
- Innokenty Smoktunovsky as Narrator's voice
