= Igor Kovalyov =

Russian animator

- Born: Igor Adolfovich Kovalyov; January 17, 1954 (age 72); Kiev, Ukrainian SSR, Soviet Union (now Kyiv, Ukraine)
- Citizenship: Russian
- Occupations: Animator, producer
- Years active: 1972–present

Igor Adolfovich Kovalyov (born 17 January 1954) is a Russian animator, director and educator, co-founder of Pilot — the first private animation studio in the Soviet Union. From 1991 to 2005 he worked at Klasky Csupo where he co-created Aaahh!!! Real Monsters and co-directed The Rugrats Movie. He currently serves as a creative producer at Soyuzmultfilm. Kovalyov is also known for his auteur films for which received multiple international awards, including three Grand Prizes at the Ottawa International Animation Festival.

== Early life and education ==
Kovalyov was born in Kiev, Ukrainian SSR (now Kyiv, Ukraine). When asked in 2002 whether he feels himself as an American, Russian or Ukrainian artist, he answered "I feel myself Russian, because I am Russian. I have 50% of Russian, three litres of Ukrainian and three litres of Polish blood... But I will never become an American". He finished animation courses at Goskino, where his teachers were Yevgeny Sivokon and David Cherkassky. He also met Alexander Tatarsky during the studies, his closest friend since.

== Career ==
=== Soviet period ===
In 1972 he joined the animation department at Kievnauchfilm to work in clean-up, inbetweening and animation. Simultaneously Kovalyov and Tatarsky started an "underground" home studio and created the Speaking of Birds comedy shorts using a handmade animation stand. They brought it to the High Courses for Scriptwriters and Film Directors and were invited to join the animation faculty. Kievnauchfilm refused to let them go, and only in 1979 Kovalyov was allowed to leave, while Tatarsky fled to Moscow on his own.

Igor studied under Fyodor Khitruk, Yuri Norstein, Vladimir Pekar and Violetta Kolesnikova. He also got into art films by Robert Bresson, Ingmar Bergman, Carl Theodor Dreyer and experimental animation by Borivoj Dovniković, Walerian Borowczyk and Priit Pärn in particular. Upon graduation in 1981 he joined Tatarsky at the Multtelefilm division of Studio Ekran as an art director. Their debut work Plasticine Crow consisted of two shorts based on "kids drawings" (in fact all of them were drawn by Kovalyov using his left hand) and one made of plasticine, becoming the first Soviet claymation film. Due to his father's sudden death Igor left for Kiev in the middle of production and stayed there for the next several years working at Kievnauchfilm again. He then returned to Moscow and started directing films alongside Tatarsky. Their most famous work was Investigation Held by Kolobki.

The friends also launched animation courses under Multtelefilm and prepared a number of prominent animators. In 1988 they founded Pilot, the first private animation studio in the USSR where they relocated along with their students. In 1989 Igor directed his first auteur film Hen His Wife which became an international success and gained him his first Grand Prize at the 1990 Ottawa International Animation Festival. During that time he was invited to the United States to meet with students at the Disney studio. He was noticed by Gábor Csupó who immediately offered him a place at Klasky Csupo. Kovalyov turned down the offer and returned to Moscow to finish Andrei Svislotskiy. Csupó continued to contact him and guaranteed that he would be able to produce auteur films, and under a pressure from his first wife and the overall crisis in animation Igor finally agreed.

=== North American period ===
In the summer of 1991, just 20 days before the August Coup, Kovalyov and his family left for Los Angeles. He started working as an animator on The Simpsons, then moved to work on Rugrats as a director and character designer. The series eventually turned into one of the most popular children's TV shows. Kovalyov also contacted some of the leading Pilot animators and suggested them to join him. This greatly upset Alexander Tatarsky who was convinced that Gábor Csupó was enticing his best staff. Nevertheless, Igor visited Tatarsky every year till his death in 2007 and discussed future plans.

In 1993 Kovalyov was offered to direct the Aaahh!!! Real Monsters pilot. As he later recalled, this was his only studio project where he was given almost full artistic control after he and Csupó had shown Investigation Held by Kolobki to the producers who became very impressed with it and asked for a similar style. Igor also rewrote the screenplay along the way, filling it with specific jokes and gags. In 1998 he co-directed The Rugrats Movie which grossed $141 million, breaking the box office record for a non-Disney animated film, although Kovalyov was left unhappy with it, claiming there was a heavy pressure from producers this time around and many of his ideas didn't make into the movie.

Csupó also kept his promise and allowed him to work on his auteur films. Bird in a Window (1996), Flying Nansen (2000) and Milch (2005) gained a number of awards at international film festivals, although the latter was finished when the studio was already in sharp decline, and Kovalyov had to seek sponsorship from his former father-in-law, a famous Russian lawyer Genrikh Padva who is listed in the credits as a producer. Same year Igor left Klasky Csupo to teach animation at California Institute of the Arts.

=== Back to Russia ===
In November 2010 he returned to Moscow to be closer to his sick mother. There he was approached by Timur Bekmambetov, who offered him to lead the production of the new Russian animated series Alisa Knows What to Do! at the Bazelevs Company. Bekmambetov also produced his next independent film Before Love in 2015. In December 2017 Kovalyov joined Soyuzmultfilm as a creative producer and worked on Prostokvashino, a successful re-launch of the Soviet mini-series Three from Prostokvashino. He is currently working on another revival of the popular Soviet series about parrot Kesha and his next auteur animation A Peacock Is Flying to the South-East.

== Personal life ==
Kovalyov is married and has a daughter and a son.

== Selected filmography ==
- Speaking of Birds (1974) (unreleased) — co-director with Alexander Tatarsky, screenwriter, artist, animator
- Adventures of Captain Wrongel (1980) — animator
- Plasticine Crow (1981) — art director
- Good Night, Little Ones! (1981) — animator (opening and closing sequences)
- Wings, legs and tails (1985) — co-director with Alexander Tatarsky, screenwriter, artist, animator
- Investigation Held by Kolobki (1986—1987) — co-director with Alexander Tatarsky
- Hen His Wife (1989) — director
- Happy Merry-Go-Round No. 22 (1990) — screenwriter
- Andrei Svislotskiy (1991) — director
- The Simpsons (1991) — animator
- Rugrats (1992—1993, 2001–2006) — director, character designer
- Aaahh!!! Real Monsters (1994) — director, character designer
- Duckman (1994) — director, original storyboard artist
- Santo Bugito (1995) — character designer
- Bird in a Window (1996) — director, screenwriter, art director, producer
- The Rugrats Movie (1998) — co-director with Norton Virgien
- Flying Nansen (2000) — director, screenwriter, art director
- Rugrats in Paris: The Movie (2000) — storyboard artist
- The Wild Thornberrys Movie (2002) — additional storyboards
- Milch (2005) — director, screenwriter, art director
- The Drinky Crow Show (2007) — director of pilot episode
- Alisa Knows What to Do! (2013—2015) — director, artistic director
- Before Love (2015) — director, screenwriter
- Prostokvashino (2018) — producer

== Preservation ==
Two of Kovalyov's films, Hen, His Wife and Andrei Svislotskiy, were preserved by the Academy Film Archive in 2007.

== See also ==
- History of Russian animation
- Pilot (studio)
- Klasky Csupo
