= Alexander Tatarsky =

Soviet/Ukrainian director, screenwriter, animator, producer, artist and artistic director

- Born: Alexander Mikhailovich Tatarsky; December 11, 1950; Kiev, Ukrainian SSR, USSR
- Died: July 22, 2007 (aged 56); Moscow, Russia
- Education: Kiev Institute of Theatre and Cinema
- Occupations: Animator, director, storyboard artist, producer, screenwriter

Alexander Mikhailovich Tatarsky (Ukrainian: Олександр Михайлович Татарський; Russian: Александр Михайлович Татарский; December 11, 1950 – July 22, 2007) was a Soviet and Russian animation director, screenwriter, animator, producer, artist, co-founder and artistic director of the Pilot studio. Merited Artist of the Russian Federation (2000). Laureate of the State Prize of the Russian Federation (1998).

== Biography ==
Tatarsky was born in Kyiv into a family of Jewish origin. His father Mikhail Semyonovich Tatarsky worked in circus and wrote gags for such clowns as Oleg Popov and Yuri Nikulin who was a close family friend. In 1974 Alexander graduated from the Kyiv Institute of Theatre and Cinema and in 1975 he finished 3-year animation courses at Goskino. From 1968 to 1980 he worked at Kievnauchfilm under the director David Cherkassky as an artist and animator. Among his works of that time was Adventures of Captain Wrongel.

During the studies he met Igor Kovalyov who became his close friend and a co-author on many projects. Together they recovered a camera from the studio's junkyard, built a handmade animation stand and created their first "underground" animated film Speaking of Birds in 1974. It wasn't released to public; instead they showed it to several prominent animation directors from Soyuzmultfilm who booked them two places at High Courses for Scriptwriters and Film Directors. Nevertheless, Kievnauchfilm refused to let Tatarsky go. In 1980 Kovalyov went to Moscow alone. Shortly after Tatarsky arrived on his own.

He managed to get work at Multtelefilm division of Studio Ekran with the help of Eduard Uspensky who wrote the screenplay for Tatarsky's first director's effort — Plasticine Crow (1981), which also happened to be Soviet first claymation film. After the enormous success Tatarsky was offered to create new opening and closing sequences for the popular children's TV show Good Night, Little Ones! also made of plasticine, which was computerized in 2002 with brighter colors and new details commissioned by the VGTRK (with a brand new version of the lullaby written by Zoya Petrova sung by Oleg Anofriyev); they were later included into the Guinness Book of Records by the number of broadcasts. It was followed by two other claymation shorts: New Year's Eve Song by Ded Moroz (1982) and Last Year's Snow Was Falling (1983). From 1984 on he worked in traditional animation only.

In 1988 Tatarsky, Kovalyov, Anatoly Prokhorov and Igor Gelashvili founded the Moscow animation studio Pilot, the first private, independent film studio in the Soviet Union aimed at adult-themed comedy movies. Tatarsky took the role of artistic director which he kept till his death. Most films created at the studio received festival awards. Shortly after the team was offered to work at the Klasky Csupo studio. And while Tatarsky refused to leave Pilot, Kovalyov and many other animators left for the United States. In his interviews Tatarsky called it a great tragedy for the Russian animation industry which was already in poor state by that time.

During the 1990s Pilot produced mostly advertising and music clips. In 1997 Tatarsky launched a side project — Pilot TV that specialized in 3D animated television shows. Its first program, Fruttis Attic, ran from 1997 to 1999 and featured Pilot Brothers, two "virtual hosts" based on the characters from Investigation Held by Kolobki (1987) who interviewed real-life celebrities. Tatarsky served as an artistic director and in 2000 launched another similar project — Turn off the Light!, a political satire loosely based on Good Night, Little Ones!. It ran for three years and won two TEFI awards as the best entertainment program in 2001 and 2002. The Red Arrow spinoff ran for a year and also won a TEFI in 2004. In 1997 he was also given Nika Award for his animated short Pilot Brothers Make Macaronies for Breakfast which was part of the Pilot Brothers mini-series.

Tatarsky was also the founder of Mountain of Gems, Pilot's biggest project made with the support of the State Committee for Cinematography. From 2004 till this day over seventy 13-minute animated shorts were produced based on fairy tales of Russian people and other ethnic groups that populate the Russian Federation and former Soviet states. Every short features its own art direction and animation technique, from stop motion and traditional animation to computer and cutout animation. They are united by claymation openings that tell the history of every specific region. Among the animation directors who took part in the project were Eduard Nazarov, Konstantin Bronzit and Tatarsky himself.

Tatarsky died of a heart attack aged 56. He was buried at the Miusskoye cemetery in Moscow.

== Filmography ==
- 1974 — Speaking of Birds (co-director with Igor Kovalyov, screenwriter, artist, animator), unreleased
- 1979 — Adventures of Captain Wrongel (animator)
- 1981 — Plasticine Crow (director, screenwriter, artist)
- 1981/2002 — Good Night, Little Ones! (director of opening and closing sequences; computerized in 2002 with new features)
- 1982 — New Year's Eve Song by Ded Moroz (director)
- 1982 — Take Care of Bread! (director)
- 1982 — Back from the Stars (director)
- 1982 — Incident in a Museum (director)
- 1982 — Tele-eye (director of the opening sequence)
- 1983 — Last Year's Snow Was Falling (director, animator)
- 1984 — The Tale of the Tiny Headed Chicken (director, animator)
- 1984 — Back Side of the Moon (director, animator)
- 1984 — Alarm Clock (director of the opening sequence)
- 1985 — Signs (director)
- 1985 — Rubik's Cube — Clownery episode (director, screenwriter, animator)
- 1986 — Wings, Legs and Tails (co-director with Igor Kovalyov, screenwriter, artist, animator)
- 1986 — Useful Advises of Professor Chainikov — episodes 5 and 6 (director)
- 1986 — Back and Forth (director)
- 1986—1987 — Investigation Held by Kolobki (co-director with Igor Kovalyov, artist)

=== At Pilot Studio ===
- 1989—1992 — Lift (creator, director, screenwriter, producer)
- 1989—2007 — The Arrival of a Train (director, screenwriter), unfinished
- 1990 — Wonders (screenwriter, producer)
- 1990 — Hen His Wife (artistic director)
- 1990 — Aviators (producer)
- 1990 — Pums (artistic director)
- 1991 — Putsch (director, screenwriter, animator)
- 1991 — Andrei Svislotskiy (artistic director)
- 1991 — Midnight Games (producer)
- 1991 — Auto Racing (screenwriter)
- 1991 — Hunter (artistic director)
- 1992 — Hypnerotomachia (producer)
- 1992 — I Hear You (producer)
- 1992 — Introduction (producer)
- 1993 — Tuk-Tuk (producer)
- 1993 — Soother (producer)
- 1993 — Origin of Species (producer)
- 1993 — Golden Gate (producer)
- 1993 — Fare - Well! (producer)
- 1993 — Other Side (producer)
- 1993 — Chew! (producer)
- 1994 — Gagarin (producer)
- 1995—1996 — Pilot Brothers (director of episode 2, screenwriter, producer)
- 1995 — Exhibitionist (artistic director)
- 1998 — Optimus Mundus — Underground episode (screenwriter)
- 1998 — Knopik and Co — (producer)
- 1999 — Gone with the Wind (director, art director, design, producer)
- 2002 — Red Gates Rashomon (co-director with Valentin Telegin, screenwriter)
- 2004—2007 — Mountain of Gems (creator, artistic director, screenwriter, co-director of episodes 2 and 8 with Valentin Telegin)
