= Dr. Livesey (Treasure Island, 1988) =

Fictional character from Treasure Island (1988)

- Treasure Island character
- First appearance: Treasure Island; September 15, 1986 and October 24, 1988
- Based on: Dr. Livesey by Robert Louis Stevenson
- Adapted by: David Cherkassky
- Voiced by: Evgeniy Papernyy (Russian); Steve Bulen (English)

In-universe information
- Species: Human
- Gender: Male
- Occupation: Doctor
- Fighting style: Swordfighting and Gunfighting
- Weapon: Rapier and Flintlock
- Nationality: British

Doctor Livesey (Ukrainian: Доктор Лівсі, Russian: Доктор Ливси) is a fictional character from the 1986 and 1988 Soviet film adaptation Treasure Island produced by Soviet animation film studio Kievnauchfilm and based on the novel character of the same name by Robert Louis Stevenson. He is voiced by Soviet actor Evgeniy Papernyy in Russian and Steve Bulen in the English dub. His primarily role throughout the film is diagnosing the other character's health conditions as well as assisting Jim Hawkins and Squire Trelawney in their hunt for Captain Flint's Treasure. Livesey is primarily recognized for his smile, optimism and infectious laugh which became the subject of an internet meme in the 2020s, especially in 2022.

== Characteristics and creation ==
In the film, his character card provides a brief "dossier" of the character, stating: "Dr. Livesey is a very good and cheerful person. The character is sociable. Not married".

According to Russia Beyond, Dr. Livesey is presented in the cartoon as a "really funny guy" as he is always shown to laugh, even while examining his patients with a wide grin (regardless of their health condition). He also defeats his opponents with playful ease as Livesey is capable of sword-fighting and shooting with a flintlock. Elegant and always dressed in a white wig, Dr. Livesey plays a key role in obtaining Captain Flint's treasure and helps Jim Hawkins escape from the vengeful pirates led by Long John Silver.

In an interview, the Russian voice actor for Livesey, Evgeniy Papernyy, stated that his friend, playwright Leonid Slutsky, served as the prototype for the character's voice. Papernyy parodied Slutsky's voice and the animator David Cherkassky approved of Papernyy's direction of Livesey's voice. In comparison, his novel counterpart is more serious and cautious, smokes a pipe and isn't an advocate for a healthy lifestyle.

== Character biography ==
The Doctor first appears at the Admiral Benbow Inn. There, he assists the unconscious Billy Bones who has suffered a stroke. Prior to this, Bones had already trusted the doctor, so he recommended that Jim Hawkins "hop to the doctor" in an emergency. Shortly after arrival, Livesey cheerfully warns Bones to quit his addiction to rum or else he would meet his fate. Bones does not heed the doctor's advice, and eventually perishes, prompting Jim to head to Livesey.

Upon arriving at Squire Trelawney's mansion, Jim informs the doctor and Trelawney about the map that he found among Bones' possessions. Upon examining it, Dr. Livesey, in his usual cheerful manner, informs his companions that the map formerly belonged to Captain Flint, and depicts the location of Flint's buried treasure. Trelawney jumps on this opportunity and proclaims that he will immediately start "recruiting the best crew in Britain" and otherwise organizing an expedition to find it.

Later, when Jim finds out about the betrayal of the crew of the Hispaniola led by Long John Silver, he tells his compatriots about Silver's plan of rebellion. Livesey and the others manage, despite artillery fire, to sneak off the ship taken over by pirates, and move to the island. Jim and his crew occupy the fort and move to the defense of the position. During the absence of Jim, who left to search for the treasure on the island, Livesey, Trelawney and Captain Smollett steal a rowboat to take refuge at an abandoned fortress where they would win in a shootout against Silver's pirates after Trelawney tricks them to fall off a cliff.

After Jim gets captured by Silver after sneaking aboard his ship, Silver reveals that Livesey and Ben Gunn had already given him the treasure map (unaware that Ben Gunn had found the treasure and dug it out during his years alone on the island). Later, when the pirates go looking for treasure in accordance to the map, Livesey and the rest of Smollett's crew set up a trap and surround the puzzled pirates. Livesey drives the surviving pirates to drop dead by explaining in his usual cheerful manner the repercussions of their constant smoking. After loading the treasure on the ship, he returns to England with the others.

== Reception ==
Livesey's Russian voice actor, Evgeniy Papernyy, spoke about the popularity of Dr. Livesey:

Dr. Livesey is such a grin of 33 teeth and generally an optimist, such a male-male. He was remarkable for the brightness of the character that [animator] Cherkassky created . <…> Thank God that this is happening. This image has become a meme, because it carries such a supply of major, energy and optimism that, God forbid, if it becomes a symbol of a male character.

Thanks to his charming smile, optimism and infectious laughter, Dr. Livesey has been often seen as a model of masculinity and even a sex symbol in the West. Russia Beyond gave Dr. Livesey the nickname of the "Gigachad of the Soviet era". According to Aroged.com, Dr. Livesey is "moving from being a brooding loner to becoming energetic, smiling, bold and self-confident".

Science fiction author Sergei Lukyanenko, who was a fan of Dr. Livesey, explained the popularity of the character as follows:

Dr. Livesey is a very colorful character who is asking for memes, these or those pictures with all his lines. Just a very successful adaptation from the book, turning him into a comedy, of course, completely out of line with the original, but a very funny, funny character. Further, at some point, this image turns out to be in demand, corresponding to the mood of people and their spirit. He begins to live a new life. It happens sometimes.

== Popularity and internet memes ==
The 1988 film adaptation of Dr. Livesey gained particular popularity between 1986 and 1988. General audiences found the character to be particularly memorable with his characteristics throughout the entire cartoon with his smiles and contagious laughs. In Russia, the popularity of the character was promoted in VKontakte "Memes on Treasure Island for every day". The character also became a popular internet meme throughout the 2020s in various incarnations although the earliest examples can date back all the way to 2018.

=== Dr. Livesey's Laughter (2020) ===
In 2020, a demotivational poster appeared with the image of Dr. Livesey with the caption "Ahahahahah" began spreading across the Runet. The onomatopoeia of the character's powerful laugh became an internet meme and a reference to the Soviet adaptation of Treasure Island.

=== The Light and Dark Sides of Dr. Livesey (2021) ===
A new meme involving Dr. Livesey displayed a darkened portrait of his character card from the film that made its debut in 2021. Initially, this variant wasn't as popular since it only gained notability in meme sites.

At the end of July 2021, a two-paneled variant that functioned similarly to the Mr. Incredible Becomes Uncanny meme that debuted a few months prior grew exponentially in mid-September in sites such as MDK. Over time, the "Dark Livesey" meme became its standalone meme with some variants including their own lore and stories. Around this time, videos of the meme were primarily distributed through TikTok and VKontakte. Users have nicknamed this variant of Livesey as "It", the organizer of the "Bristol Massacre" and other similar names.

=== Dr. Livesey Phonk Walk (2022) ===
In July 2022, a short excerpt from the film along the song “Why Not” by the Russian drift phonk musician Ghostface Playa was published on TikTok which was titled “Doctor Livesey walking” which subsequently went viral. The video was posted by TikTok user weirdyunus and has received over 4.5 million views on the site. In the clip, Dr. Livesey proclaims the line "The word 'rum' and the word 'death' mean the same thing to you." It then transitions to Jim Hawkins, Dr. Livesey and Squire Trelawney entering the Spyglass Inn, moving with a certain pathos. The clip became a template for the meme "Dr. Livesey Phonk Walk". After gaining enough popularity on TikTok, the meme gained a massive spike of Google searches on August 14, 2022. Dr. Livesey's overtly confident walk and dazzling smile have spawned hundreds of new memes. Parodies of the meme also began using characters from different intellectual properties such as Castlevania, Kirby, Star Trek Online and Doom. The new meme with Livesey gained enough notability to be reported on the television network REN TV.

Livesey's strong physique, self-confidence and bold walk gave frequent comparisons to another meme character of the year known as the Gigachad. With the energetic and cheerful nature of Dr. Livesey, some people saw an improved version of the sigma male which was someone that didn't need the approval of others.
