= Wings, legs and tails =

- Directed by: Igor Kovalyov, Alexander Tatarsky
- Written by: Albert Ivanov, Igor Kovalyov, Alexander Tatarsky
- Produced by: G. Saraeva
- Starring: Alexander Filippenko and Alexei Ptitsyn (voice only)
- Cinematography: L. Revtov
- Edited by: Lubov' Georgiyeva
- Music by: Yury Chernavsky
- Distributed by: Studio Ekran (Multtelefilm)
- Release date: 1986
- Running time: 3 min. 53 sec.
- Country: Soviet Union
- Language: Russian

Wings, legs and tails (Russian: Крылья, ноги и хвосты; translit. Krilya, nogi i khvosti) is a 1986 Soviet animation film by Alexander Tatarsky and Igor Kovalyov (Studio Ekran). The film is about a vulture who attempts to teach an ostrich to fly. The film is a fable for kids telling that everybody has their limitations and abilities.

== Plot ==
In a scorching desert, nearly barren and lifeless, a few creatures still roam: lizards, insects, and even ostriches. One day, an ostrich encounters a vulture. The vulture invites the ostrich to join him, saying, "Hey, little bird, come with me—there's plenty of tasty things over there!" The ostrich agrees, and while the vulture flies, the ostrich runs after him. This annoys the vulture, who exclaims, "I said 'fly,' not 'run'!" When asked if he forgot how to fly, the ostrich admits he never learned. Determined, the vulture insists on teaching the ostrich to fly, warning, "If you can't, we'll teach you; if you don't want to, we'll make you!"

Along the way, realizing the ostrich's timid nature, the vulture tries to intimidate him by plucking feathers from his tail to wear on his own head. However, the flight training fails, and it soon becomes clear that the ostrich can actually run much faster than the vulture can fly. The ostrich takes charge, declaring, "Wings, wings… Legs!" Realizing his own advantage, he frightens the exhausted vulture, reclaims his feathers, and proudly walks away, leaving the vulture with his head buried in the sand.

The scene closes with a lizard, who lost her tail in an earlier mishap caused by the ostrich. Now sporting a new tail, she reappears to conclude the "debate" over wings and legs, proclaiming with authority that the most important feature is, in fact, a tail. Plucking the last feather from the vulture's head, she hums a cheerful tune and vanishes into the sunset.
