= Radna Sakhaltuev =

Ukrainian animation director (1935–2025)

- Радна Пилипович Сахалтуєв
- Born: May 15, 1935; Ulan-Ude, Buryat ASSR, Russian SFSR, Soviet Union
- Died: August 31, 2025 (aged 90)
- Education: VGIK (1961)
- Occupations: Art director, animator, illustrator
- Known for: Adventures of Captain Wrongel; Treasure Island
- Awards: Merited Artist of Ukraine (1988)

Radna Pylypovych Sakhaltuev (Ukrainian: Радна Пилипович Сахалтуєв; 15 May 1935 – 31 August 2025) was a Soviet and Ukrainian art director of animation of Buryat origin.

== Life and work ==
Sakhaltuev was born in Ulan-Ude on 15 May 1935. In 1955, he entered the All-Union State Institute of Cinematography, and studied animation.

In the 1970s and 1980s, he was one of the leading artists of the Ukrainian satirical magazine "Perets". He also participated in the illustration of the children's magazine "Piznayko". He illustrated books from the publishing houses "Veselka", "Youth", "Morning", amongst others.

He worked on a number of Soviet animated films throughout his career, including Adventures of Captain Wrongel and Treasure Island.

Sakhaltuev died on 31 August 2025, at the age of 90.
