= Soul Control =

German music duo

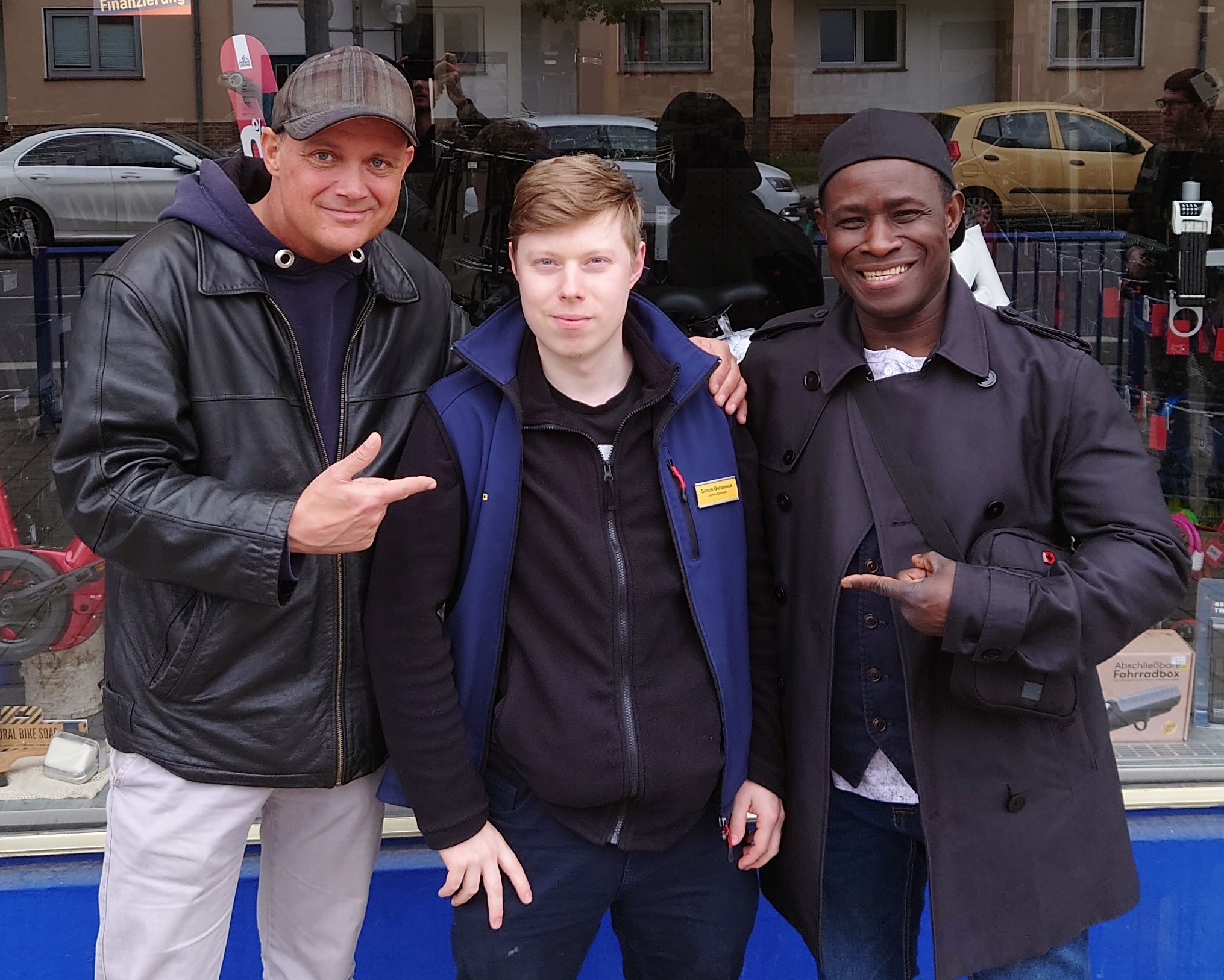
- Quella (left) and Buck (right) together with German musician DJ Kaito (2023)

Background information
- Origin: Germany
- Genres: Pop; Latin pop; rock; R&B; soul; children's; pop rap; ragga; electronic; Eurodance; bubblegum pop
- Years active: 2004–present
- Labels: Universal; Na klar!; ZYX Music; Sony BMG; Avex Trax
- Members: Tom Quella; Leo Buck

Soul Control is a German musical duo consisting of Thomas "Tom" Quella (born 1970 in Berlin) and Leonard "Leo" Buck (born 1979 in Sierra Leone). They had a hit with their 2004 single "Chocolate (Choco Choco)".

== History ==
Their debut 2004 single "Chocolate (Choco Choco)" was placed in the top five of the charts in Germany, Austria and Switzerland and was released in over 40 countries. Quella and Buck met at a concert by Leo's band Moddeling Throu in 1999. The duo have described themselves as "soul mates", citing a shared creative understanding and close artistic bond. In interviews, they have stated that Quella often senses what Buck intends to express in their music, and vice versa. According to the pair, this mutual intuition and sense of creative connection inspired the name Soul Control. Together with Bruce Hammond produced both "Chocolate" and the following album Here We Go. In 2004 they were Part of the Toggo tour.

In 2007 they worked with Gerald Anderson for the song "Don't Play with Your Noodle (La La La)". This was also released on the album Gerald's Noodle Dance . A similar thing happened with the song "So Sexy". This time they worked together with Marian Rivera.

The Japanese version of "Chocolate" was the main theme of the FujiTV production Ponkikki.

== Discography ==
=== Albums ===
==== Studio albums ====
Title	Details	Peak chart positions		
Title	Details	GER	SWI	JPN
Here We Go	Released: 2004; Label: Na klar! / Universal Records	88	87	—
Kimito Choco Choco	Released: 2006 only in Japan; Label: Avex Trax	—	—	104
Don't Play with Your Noodle	Released: 12 March 2007; Label: Universal Records	—	—	—
"—" denotes items which were not released in that country or failed to chart.

=== EPs ===
Title	Details	Peak chart positions	
Title	Details	GER	SWI
Deutschland ist Cool / Deutschland ist Geil	Released: 2006; Label: Maxhybrid / Sony Music	93	—
Chirpy Chirpy Cheep Cheep (What f... song?)	Released: 28 July 2006; Label: Na klar! / Universal Records	—	—
"—" denotes items which were not released in that country or failed to chart.

=== Singles ===
Title	Year	Peak chart positions					Certifications
Title	Year	GER	AUT	BEL (FL)	SWI	UK	Certifications
"Chocolate (Choco Choco)"	2004	5	2	14	3	25	Philippines: Platinum
"Baila Loco"	2004	29	63	35	–	–	
"Boogaloo"	2006	–	–	–	–	–	
"Oide Yo Goringo"	2007	–	–	–	–	–	
"Don't Play With Your Noodle (La La La)"	2007	–	–	–	–	–	
"So Sexy"	2008	–	–	–	–	–	
"African Child"	2010	–	–	–	–	–	
"Now That You've Gone"	2019	–	–	–	–	–	
"Butterfly"	2020	–	–	–	–	–	
"—" denotes items which were not released in that country or failed to chart.

=== Other songs ===
Title	Year	Peak chart positions
Title	Year	GER
"Deutschland ist Cool"	2006	93
"Chirpy Chirpy Cheep Cheep"	2006	—

== Awards ==
- ADTV Award 2004 for the "Choco Choco Dance"
- Dutch Nickelodeon Kids Choice Award 2004
- World record 2004: 1987 people danced to "Chocolate" at the same time.
- Entry in the Guinness Book of Records. On 4 July 2006, 200,000 people danced in Berlin to the song "Chirpy Chirpy Cheep Cheep".
- In 2017, another attempt was made in Poland to set a world record with "Chocolate".

== See also ==
- Music of Germany
