= Eduard Nazarov =

Soviet and Russian animator

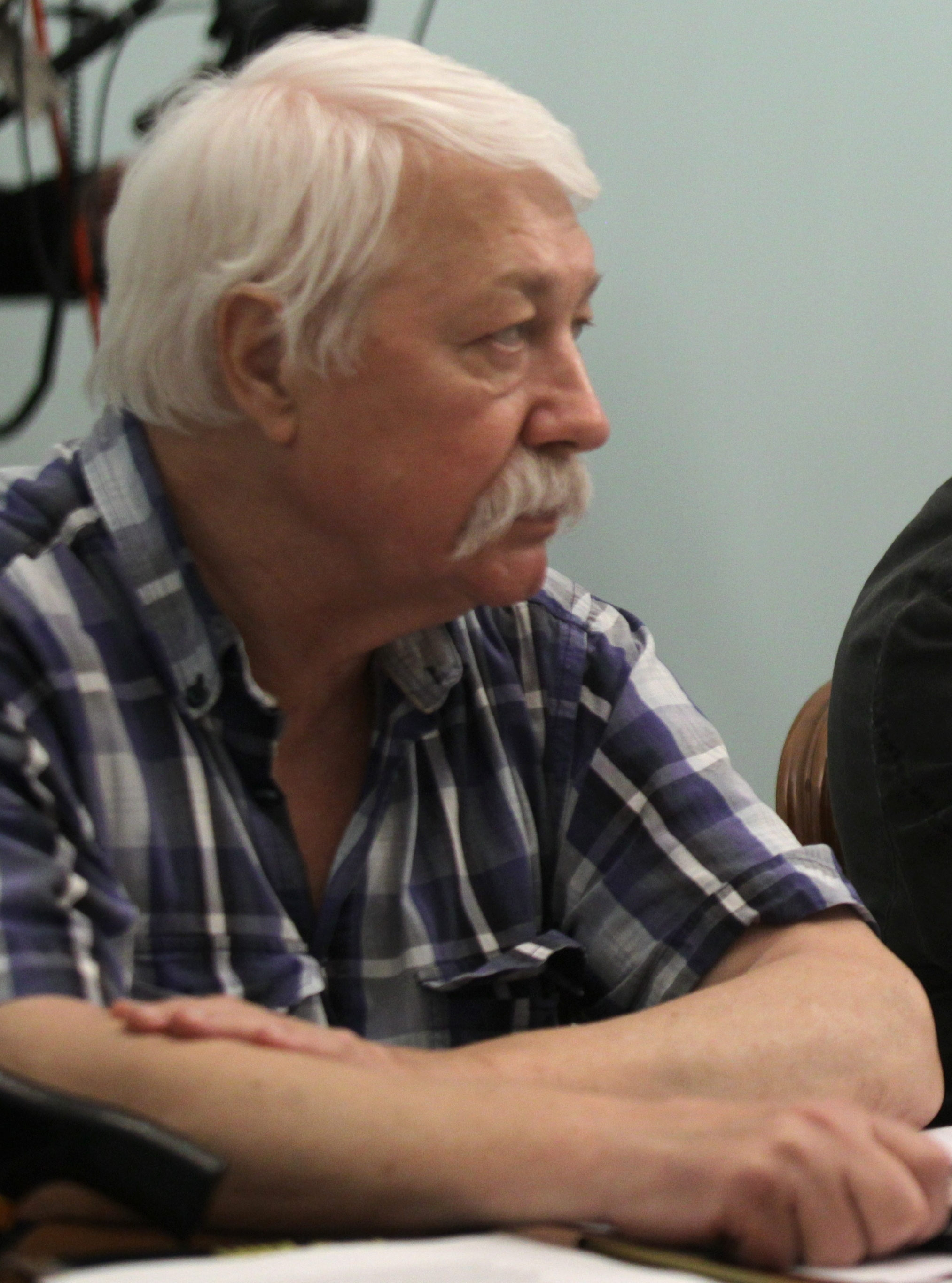
- Nazarov in 2011
- Born: Eduard Vasilievich Nazarov; 23 November 1941; Moscow, USSR
- Died: 11 September 2016 (aged 74); Moscow, Russia
- Occupations: Animator, artist, educator

Eduard Vasilievich Nazarov (Russian: Эдуард Васильевич Назаров; 23 November 1941 – 11 September 2016) was a Soviet and Russian animator, screenwriter, voice actor, book illustrator and educator, artistic director at the Pilot Studio (2007–2016), vice-president of ASIFA (1987–1999) and a co-president of the KROK International Animated Films Festival. He was awarded People's Artist of Russia in 2012.

== Biography ==
Eduard Nazarov was born in a bomb shelter during the Battle of Moscow. His parents were Russian engineers who met in late 1930s while studying at Moscow institutes. Nazarov's ancestors came from the Bryansk Oblast and had a peasant background. He started painting as a child and while in the 9th grade entered an art school where he met Yuri Norstein, who became a lifelong friend.

After three years serving in the Soviet Army, Nazarov was accepted into the Stroganov Institute. Simultaneously, he started working at Soyuzmultfilm in 1959 as an apprentice, teaching himself, since he was too late to join animation courses. He worked as a renderer, art director's assistant under Mikhail Tsekhanovsky and art director under Fyodor Khitruk, most famously creating Winnie-the-Pooh for the Soviet adaptation of the book.

Since 1973 he was directing his own short films, often combining duties as an art director, screenwriter and voice actor. Once Upon a Dog is generally considered his most prominent work; it was awarded the First Prize at the 1983 Odense International Film Festival and a Special Jury Award at the 1983 Annecy International Animated Film Festival. During the 2012 Open Russian Festival of Animated Film ceremony dedicated to 100 years of national animation the film topped the "Golden Hundred" list of the best National animated films. It also was named 65th on the Top 150 Japanese and World Animation list at the 2003 Laputa Animation Festival in Tokyo.

Between 1979 and 2000 Nazarov was teaching at the High Courses for Screenwriters and Film Directors. He also illustrated various books and magazines.

His last film Martynko (1987) was made during perestroika and banned for four years because Nazarov refused to change the name of the cartoon princess Raisa. Censors saw her as a satire on the First Lady of the Soviet Union Raisa Gorbacheva despite the fact that all the characters were borrowed directly from the eponymous fairy tale by Boris Shergin. At the same time, Nazarov left Soyuzmultfilm, stating that it turned into "a cross between an isolation ward full of choking gas and a Cancer Ward".

In 1988, he was awarded the Vasilyev Brothers State Prize of the RSFSR. Between 1987 and 1999, he served as vice-president of ASIFA.

During the 1990s, he directed commercials and hosted a number of television shows dedicated to Russian and global animation. In 1991, he became a co-president of the KROK International Animated Films Festival, along with David Cherkassky. In 1993 he co-founded the SHAR animation school and studio along with Andrei Khrzhanovsky, Yuri Norstein and Fyodor Khitruk where he worked until his death.

In 2004 Nazarov joined the Pilot Studio in their Mountain of Gems project, a grand government-backed TV series that united the efforts of many animators. Between 2004 and 2015, they produced nearly seventy 13-minute shorts based on various traditional fairy tales from different former Soviet regions. In addition to art direction, Nazarov also co-wrote screenplays and did voice-over for some of them. After the sudden death of Alexander Tatarsky in 2007, he became the artistic director of the studio.

Nazarov suffered from diabetes for many years and had to undergo surgery at the end of his life to amputate his leg. He continued teaching students over Skype.

Eduard Nazarov died on 11 September 2016 and was buried at the Vagankovo Cemetery in Moscow. He was survived by his wife Tatiana.

== Selected filmography ==
- Boniface's Holiday (1965) – animator
- Passion of Spies (1967) – voice actor (all characters, uncredited)
- Film, Film, Film (1968) – assistant art director
- Zigzag of Success (1968) – animator (animated sequences)
- Winnie-the-Pooh (1969) – art director
- Winnie-the-Pooh Pays a Visit (1971) – art director
- Winnie-the-Pooh and a Busy Day (1972) – art director
- Island (1973) – art director
- A Princess and a Cannibal (1977) – director, screenwriter
- Ograblenie po... (1978) – voice actor (all characters, uncredited)
- Hunt (1979) – director, screenwriter
- Adventures of Captain Wrongel (1979) – voice actor (Black Cattlefish captain)
- Once Upon a Dog (1982) – director, screenwriter, voice actor (narrator)
- Ant Adventure (1983) – director, screenwriter, art director, voice actor (various)
- About Sidorov Vova (1985) – director, screenwriter, art director
- Martynko (1987) – director, screenwriter, voice actor (tsar, narrator)
- Gagarin (1994) – artistic director
- Mountain of Gems (2004–2015) – artistic director, director (3 episodes), screenwriter (5 episodes), voice actor (various)
- Masha and the Bear (2009–2010) – voice actor (Father Frost)

== Illustrated books ==
- KOAPP! KOAPP! KOAPP! 8 vols. Moscow: Iskusstvo, 1969–1978

== Sources ==
- Eduard Nazarov at IMDb
- Eduard Nazarov at Animator.ru
