= Yury Chernavsky =

Russian musician (1947–2025)

Yury Chernavsky Юрий Чернавский
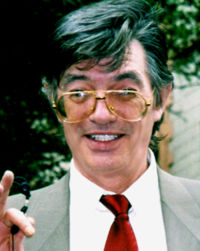
- Chernavsky in 2005

Background information
- Born: March 17, 1947; Tambov, Russian SFSR, Soviet Union
- Died: September 29, 2025 (aged 78)
- Genres: New wave; progressive rock; funk rock; rock; rock and roll; pop; synthpop; R&B
- Occupations: Composer; producer
- Years active: 1969–2025
- Labels: How's That; LA3D Motion; Starrill Records
- Website: Record V2.0

Yury Alexandrovich Chernavsky (Russian: Юрий Александрович Чернавский; March 17, 1947 – 29 September 2025) was a Russian producer, composer and songwriter. Chernavsky was a member of performance rights organisations such as GEMA, BMI, and RAO, and had also been recognized as an Honored Artist of the RSFSR.

== Education ==
While living in Russia, he obtained professional musical education in the First Music College in Tambov city, the Rachmaninov Tambov State Academy of Music (class of violin), and the Tambov Branch of the Moscow State University of Culture and Arts (composition, arrangement). After relocation to the United States, he took master classes, SE-Hollywood (composer, producer, audio-movie business). He demonstrated a virtuosity in arrangement and in playing violin, saxophone, keyboards, flute and East Asian exotic instruments.

== Professional career ==
=== Work in the USSR ===
From 1969 to 1983, Chernavsky was fully involved in concert activities.

In 1969–1973, Yury performed in jazz orchestras of Boris Rensky, Oleg Lundstrem, Leonid Utyosov, etc. In 1973–1975, he was a lead saxophone and arranger in the State Orchestra of Azerbaijan, which at that time was compiled of the best jazz stars in the Soviet Union.

Since 1976, a new era of Chernavsky's creativity had begun when he entered the mainstream in music. He worked as a musical director with Soviet vocal-instrumental ensembles Fantasy and Krasnye Maki (Red Poppies) and, later on, with rock and pop groups Carnival, Dinamik, and Vesyolye Rebyata (Jolly Fellows).

In the 1980s, Chernavsky wrote music and worked as a composer and producer. He worked with many Russian stars including Alla Pugacheva, Valery Leontyev, Mikhail Boyarsky, Sergei Minaev, Tõnis Mägi, Vladimir Presniakov Jr., Anne Veski and many others. His musical passions were more oriented towards mainstream music, R&B and electro-fusion than to the heavy rock. Chernavsky was also active in the movie industry, collaborating with Georgy Jungwald-Hilkevich, Sergei Solovyov, Valery Pendrakovsky and other prominent directors. He also created sound tracks for more than 20 animated cartoons, being in close cooperation with the famous animators Igor Kovalev and Aleksandr Tatarskiy (author of cartoons Investigation Held by Kolobki, Wings, Legs and Tails, Pilot Brothers, etc., that were awarded international golden prizes), and other authors.

In 1981, he created a rock group, later named Dinamik, including Yury Kitaev, Sergei Ryzhov, Vladimir Kuzmin, and Yury Chernavsky. In that group, Chernavsky was a music director, played on keyboard and saxophone, and realized as an arranger a lot of his own new musical ideas that were reflected in two first group albums, Dinamik I and Dinamik II.

From 1983, he worked as a musical leader in the group Vesyolye Rebyata where he recorded the album Banana Islands, which became popular in the Soviet Union. This audio album as well as Automatic Kit, later purchased by the EMI Europe publishing company, represented the first international level of Russian rock music.

In 1986, Yury was acting as a founder and president of the pop music studio SPM "Record" created under the auspices of the Ministry of Culture of the Soviet Union. This was the first in Russia largest independent professional company in the field of entertainment, with a multitude of branches throughout the country. Record gave a start in life for the famous Russian manager and producer Sergei Lisovsky, ATV TV company, pop groups Tеnder May, Lube, Mirage, and Class, record studios by Igor Babenko, B. Zharov, Igor Matvienko and others, a good number of prominent Russian performers including Vyacheslav Malezhik, Igor Talkov, Andrei Razin, Alexander Malinin, Natalia Vetlitskaya, Sergei Krylov, Oleg Gazmanov, Vladimir Presniakov Jr. and more.

The Russian superstar Alla Pugacheva worked closely with Chernavsky, and in 1984, together with the vocal group ABBA, performed his songs "Through the Eyes of a Child" and "Superman" that were presented by the Swedish TV star Jacob Dahlin). These songs for the first time ranked highest in West European charts.

Goodwill Games opening at the Luzhniki Stadium. Moscow, 1986

=== International festivals ===
Chernavsky was the musical director and composer for the following major international forums:

- Ice Ballet, final show at the World Festival of Youth and Students, Moscow, 1985
- Goodwill Games organized by Ted Turner and Mikhail Gorbachev, Moscow, 1986
- Soviet-Indian Festival held for a period of two years, 1987–1988, in more than 30 cities in India and the Soviet Union

=== Work in Germany ===
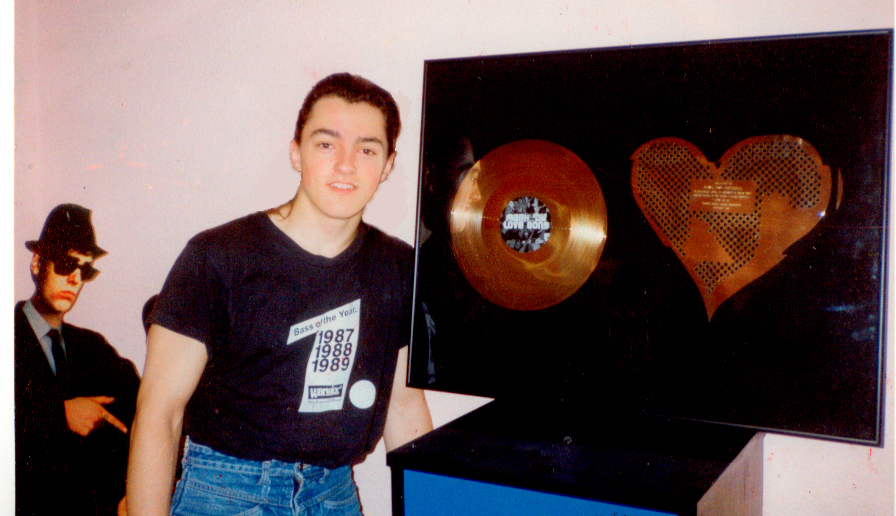
Damon Chernavsky at "How's That" Studio, Berlin, 1994

From 1990, Chernavsky worked in Berlin, Germany, where he established in 1993 a record company "How's that" Music Gmbh with the known hit maker Bruce Hammond. Hits created by this company, including the Mark'Oh project with songs "Love Song", "Tears Don’t Lie" and others, held the first place in the Top Hot 100 European charts for one and a half years. At the same time, Chernavsky, with his partners Bruce Hammond Earlam, Douglas Wilgrove and Pikosso Records company, was involved as a producer and composer in recording Beyond the Banana Islands and Magic Tour albums, which were released in Europe and Russia. Those were the first albums of his produced with German, Russian and U.S. performers.

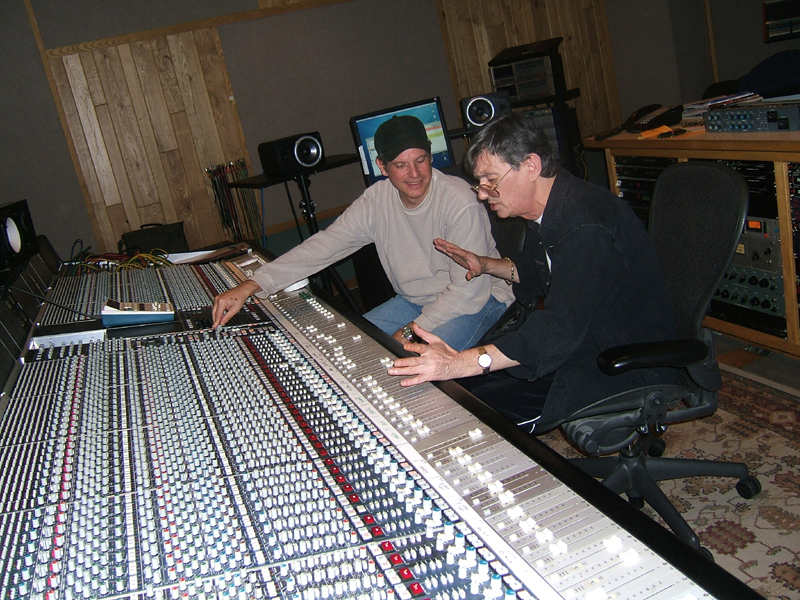
George Landress and Chernavsky at Track Studios, Hollywood

=== Work in Hollywood ===
In 1994, Chernavsky moved to work in Hollywood, where he established a company, LA 3D Motion, with his older son Damon. Damon worked with intense computer graphics technology, CGI, in video movie industry. Chernavsky was a producer for his son who later, on his 18th birthday, received recognition on the MTV Awards for the best music-video of the year. He was awarded for his work on "Get Down" by Backstreet Boys, and he also worked for groups 'N Sync, The Boys, Rod Stewart, Tupac Shakur, Dance Jam, etc. Damon's creative team works as experts and masters in the computer Movie FX with many companies in Hollywood. He also worked with independent corporate FX groups such as Digital Domain leading by worldwide known movie director James Cameron (The Terminator, True Lies, Titanic) and others companies. Currently, Damon is a co-owner of the Hollywood 3D FX studio Red Square Studios.

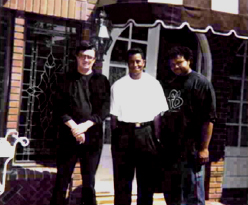
Chernavsky, Jermaine Jackson and Damon Elliott

As an Executive Producer, Chernavsky was a contributor to Dance Jam Project, Hollywood, CA. He maintained close relations with the musical family clans of Dionne Warwick – Damon Elliott, the Jackson family – Jermaine Jackson, companies and recording studios Red Square Studios, Track Records, Ambience Music Group, Pikosso Records, EMI, SONY, etc. He continued traveling and experimenting in the field of international music business with young American and European singers and musicians (in the style of R&B and rap), movie actors, and directors.

=== Later career ===
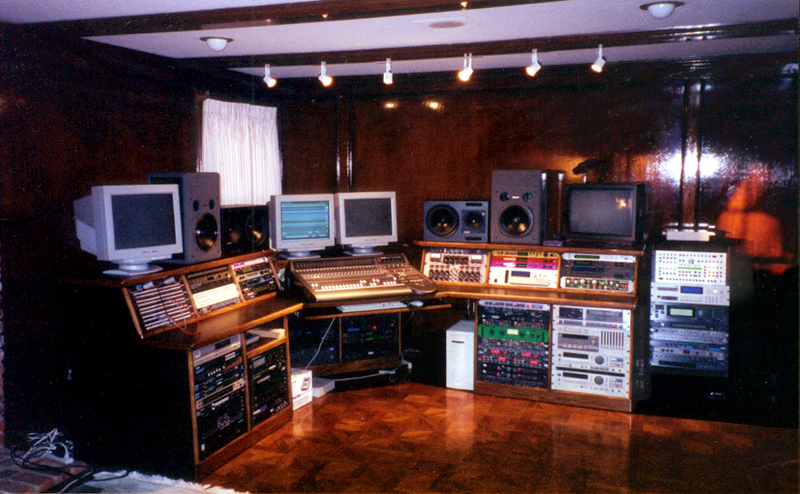
Chernavsky's Bel Air Studios

Chernavsky worked on major projects in the US and Europe developing Russian performers, advancing new ideas on the world market, and selecting young European professional artists (e.g., a Fox group / Pikosso Records "Hollywood Dreams V. 2") and famous martial arts fighters to present their skills at international entertainment levels.

He also taught master classes on vocals and sound engineering.

== Death ==
Chernavsky died on 29 September 2025, at the age of 78.
