= Treasure Island (1988 film) =

Soviet animated film

- DVD cover
- Ukrainian: Острiв скарбiв, romanized: Ostriv skarbiv; Russian: Остров сокровищ, romanized: Ostrov sokrovishch
- Directed by: David Cherkassky
- Written by: Yuri Alikov; David Cherkassky
- Based on: Treasure Island by Robert Louis Stevenson
- Starring: Yevhen Papernyi; Viktor Andriyenko; Valeriy Bessarab; Yury Yakovlev; Armen Dzhigarkhanyan
- Music by: Volodymyr Bystryakov
- Animation by: Radna Sakhaltuev
- Production company: Kievnauchfilm
- Release dates: 15 September 1986 (Captain Flint's Map); 24 October 1988 (Captain Flint's Treasure)
- Running time: 107 minutes; 72 minutes (U.S.)
- Country: Soviet Union
- Language: Russian

Treasure Island (Ukrainian: «Острiв скарбiв», romanized: Ostriv skarbiv; Russian: «Остров сокровищ», romanized: Ostrov sokrovishch) is a Soviet (Note: The film was produced by Kievnauchfilm (Kyivnaukfilm), which was based in Ukraine. At the time of the production and release, Ukraine was a part of the Soviet Union, hence the film's classification as both Soviet and Ukrainian.) two-part live-action/animated adventure comedy television film adaptation of Robert Louis Stevenson's novel Treasure Island (1883). Created by the studio Kievnauchfilm between 1986 and 1988, the film combines mostly traditional animation with live action interludes in which costumed actors sing songs warning against vices such as drinking and smoking.

The first part, Captain Flint's Map, aired in 1986; the second, Captain Flint's Treasure, aired in 1988. Subsequent airings combined them into one program. The film won prizes at the all-Union festivals in Minsk in 1987 and Kyiv in 1989.

It was also released in the United States in a cut-down, animation-only version titled The Return to Treasure Island. The film became a cult favourite in the former Soviet states, and in 2022 its character Dr. Livesey became the basis of an international internet meme.

== Plot ==
Throughout the movie, character introductions are shown through dossier-like cards, which, among other traits, label them as "not married" (a reference to Seventeen Moments of Spring). Live-action segments are also presented with songs of morality about various vices and virtues, such as the dangers of drugs, or the benefits of exercise, to the audience.

=== Captain Flint's Map ===
The film begins with a comedic live-action segment where a pirate, Captain Flint, attempts to defend himself from other pirates who seek his treasure map. Billy Bones, an allergic and alcoholic pirate, in animated form, surprise-attacks Flint and takes the map.

On a stormy night, Bones, with his cat friend, arrives at the Admiral Benbow Inn. He asks the innkeeper, Jim Hawkins, to notify him should an old one-legged sailor arrive, unaware that a pirate gang led by a blind but vicious pirate, known as Blind Pew, is spying on them. Pew, along with Bones' former shipmate Black Dog, revisits the inn the next morning. Black Dog demands the map from Bones, but after a fight, Bones tricks him, and Black Dog runs off into the countryside, assuming that Bones has escaped. Dr. Livesey, an always jubilant doctor, hospitalizes Bones after his sneezing knocks a ceiling plank loose, injuring him, and, along with his alcoholism, also causes a stroke. Afterward, Bones warns Hawkins that the locked chest contained in his room is in danger of being stolen, charging him to flee with it to Livesey, currently residing at the estate of Squire Trelawney, for protection, should the pirates return.

Some time later, Pew revisits the inn, and gravely presents Bones with a black spot, which warns Bones of a visit from the pirate gang at 10 PM. Bones panics, further warning Hawkins of the importance of Flint's map contained in the chest. Bones' alcoholism catches up to him, and with one final sneeze he dies of another stroke. Fearing the pirates' arrival, Hawkins takes the Black Spot, and the map from the chest, and flees from the inn. Pew, Black Dog, and the rest of the pirate gang return to raid Bones' chest for the map, but discover only gold coins inside. Hawkins quickly sets forth on horseback toward Trelawney's estate. The pirates notice, but fail to stop him from afar. Everyone, except for Pew, decides to cut their losses, taking the money from Bones' chest. Pew tries to persuade the pirates to find the map, but accidentally trips himself into a barrel, and careens off a sheer cliff to his death in the ocean.

Hawkins arrives at the estate and meets with Dr. Livesey and Squire Trelawney, presenting them with the map. The two decide to search for a crew to hunt for the treasure, and the three travel by coach to Bristol. Arriving by morning, the trio stops at the Spyglass Inn, looking to meet with the inn's owner, Long John Silver. A pirate patron provokes Hawkins, who fearlessly fights him back. Despite the apparent difference in strength, Hawkins easily overpowers the pirate due to him performing morning exercises combined with the pirate's alcoholism, scaring off the rest of the patrons in the process. Trelawney calls on Silver (implied to be the same one-legged sailor Billy Bones feared), who offers his ship, the Hispaniola, and his crew (who turn out to be Pew's pirate gang in disguise), for the voyage.

Following the lead of Smollett, the ship's stiff-backed captain, the crew sets up and casts off for the island. During the night, Silver and his crew meet in the ship's armory. Hawkins, awakened by their footsteps, sneaks into the armory as well, and eavesdrops on them. There, the film concludes as Hawkins learns that Silver was Captain Flint's right-hand man, and also learns of their plan to mutiny against Smollett and steal the treasure for themselves.

=== Captain Flint's Treasure ===
Continuing from the first part, Hawkins sneaks back to Livesey, Trelawney, and Smollett, to inform them of Silver's mutiny. Smollett proposes they play dumb for the time being, but the four are unaware that one of Silver's men is listening, who then notifies Silver that Hawkins, Livesey, Trelawney, and Smollett know of his plan.

The next day, the Hispanola arrives at Treasure Island, and Smollett allows shore leave for Silver and his men. To keep Hawkins, Smollett, Trelawney, and Livesey from leaving, Silver secretly places them under guard. Despite this, Hawkins escapes, absconds a dinghy, and attempts to row to the island alone, but Silver and a complement of the crew chase after him. While hiding from them, Hawkins encounters Ben Gunn, a former member of Flint's crew. Gunn explains that he and the rest of his crew killed Flint, betraying him for the treasure. Three years later, Gunn returned with the crew and led a search for the treasure, but ended up finding nothing. Out of the crew's displeasure, Gunn was left marooned on the island. Finding that he is in good company, Gunn agrees to help Hawkins find the treasure.

Back on the ship, Livesey spots Hawkins, Silver's crew, and an abandoned fortress on the island. Livesey, Trelawney, and Smollett then sneak away, stealing another of the ship's dinghies. One of Silver's men notices their escape, and the crew attempts to sink the dinghy. The three heroes arrive safely on the island and take shelter in the fortress. Silver follows them as they arrive, and demands they surrender, or face an attack in one hour. Later, Silver and his men attack the fortress. After Trelawney tricks Silver's men into running off of a cliff by making a fake inn, Livesey humiliating a pirate by cutting off both his clothes and body hair, and Hawkins defeats a larger pirate using a makeshift rocket, the heroes are victorious.

That night, Gunn reveals the location of the already-exhumed treasure to Livesey. Finding Livesey's bed empty and assuming that he has a plan, Hawkins attempts his own plan to overtake the Hispanola. There, he encounters Israel Hands, one of Silver's men, and is forced into a fight. Hawkins defeats Hands, successfully capturing the ship, then returns to the fort. There, Silver and his remaining men have been lying in wait, where Silver captures Hawkins. Silver explains that Livesey has departed the fort with Smollett and Trelawney. The pirates attempt to mutiny against Silver, losing confidence in their leader's recent command, but Silver makes a private deal with Hawkins to protect each other, and an open deal with the pirates where he reveals that he has the map to the treasure, given to him by Livesey as part of their deal.

At daybreak, they find the burial spot indicated on the map, but Livesey, Gunn, Trelawney, and Smollett have set up an ambush. The pirates, sans Silver, attempt to escape by running, but encounter Livesey, who examines them, and finds that their pipe smoking has deteriorated their health. When the pirates realize this, compounded with their exhaustion from running, they die on-the-spot. Successful in their mission, the remaining crew loads the treasure onto the ship and sets sail back to England.

The film ends featuring some of the animated main characters alongside their voice actors in live-action. After the credits, the live-action pirate crew finds the hidden treasure and opens the chest, only to find a spring-loaded sign saying "The End".

== Cast ==
=== Voice cast ===
- Valeriy Bessarab as Jim Hawkins
- Armen Dzhigarkhanyan as Long John Silver
- Viktor Andriyenko as Captain Smollett and Billy Bones
- Yevhen Papernyi as Dr. Livesey and "dossier" narrator
- Boris Voznyuk as Squire Trelawney
- Yury Yakovlev as Ben Gunn
- Grigory Tolchinsky as Black Dog
- Heorhiy Kyshko as Blind Pew
- Volodymyr Bystryakov as Blind Pew's dog
- Volodymyr Zadniprovsky as the "cowardish pirate"

=== Live-action cast ===
- Instrumental ensemble VIA (ВИА) and the theater company "Grotesque":
  - Valeriy Chyhlyayev as Leading Pirate/Captain Flint
  - Yuri Nevganonny as Captain Flint in Ben Gunn's story
  - Viktor Andrienko
  - Anatoliy Dyachenko
  - Vyacheslav Dubinin
  - Mykhail Tserishenko
  - Alexander Levit
  - Vitali Vasilkov
  - Semyon Grigoriev
  - David Cherkassky
  - Vladimir Chiglyayev
  - Oleg Sheremenko

== Production ==
Treasure Island was a collaboration between director David Cherkassky and cartoonist Radna Sakhaltuev. Their previous collaborations included the films Adventures of Captain Wrongel and Doctor Aybolit.

The film features musical interludes with live actors that explain, for example, the evils of drinking alcohol or smoking. These scenes were added to help meet the deadline for the cartoon and were filmed at night. The studio allowed about two years to complete two hours of film, and as the deadline neared the songs were recorded overnight. The live action appears mainly in the opening minutes of each part.

== Release ==
The film was released in two parts. The first, Captain Flint's Map, aired in 1986; the second, Captain Flint's Treasure, aired in 1988; the two parts run 48 and 59 minutes.

It was released in the United States as The Return to Treasure Island direct-to-video between 1989 and 1992. The live-action sequences were removed, leaving a cut 34 minutes shorter than the original.

In 2012, the Russian Parliament passed a law that prohibited exhibition of films to minors that depicted smoking or alcohol consumption, actions which the pirates take many times in the film. A public outcry over this prohibition resulted in an exemption for "movies that have significant historical and cultural value", including Treasure Island.

=== Home media ===
A restored Russian DVD was released by Krupny Plan on 16 March 2006, and an export edition with Russian, English and French soundtracks was issued by RUSCICO under the title Treasure Island. The American cut, Return to Treasure Island, was released on home video in 1992 with the live-action sequences removed.

== Reception ==
The animation drew heavily on the cut-out style of Terry Gilliam's work for Monty Python's Flying Circus. Reviewing the film thirty years after its release, the culture magazine Kulturologia described it as a phenomenon that children watched with the same enthusiasm as their parents had, and noted that its live-action musical interludes had drawn a mixed response.

Treasure Island won the Grand Prize for its first part at the All-Union Television Film Festival in Minsk in 1987, a prize for best full-length film at the All-Union Animation Film Festival in Kyiv in 1989, and first prize at an international television-film festival in Czechoslovakia.

== Legacy ==
In 2005, Ukrainian game development studio Action Forms made an official PC adventure game adaptation of Treasure Island. Director David Cherkassky, original voice cast members Yevhen Papernyi and Viktor Andriyenko, and original animators from the film participated in the development of the game.

In August 2022, the character Dr. Livesey became the subject of an international internet meme, in which his confident gait whilst entering the Spyglass Inn, with Hawkins and Trelawney, is set to the phonk track "Why Not" by Ghostface Playa.

DR LIVESEY ROM AND DEATH EDITION is a 2023 bullet hell shooter game created by Russian publisher Agafonoff Official Group that features characters and animations from the film.

== See also ==
- List of animated feature films of 1988
