= Investigation Led by Kolobki =

- Directed by: Igor Kovalyov; Alexander Tatarsky
- Written by: Eduard Uspensky
- Produced by: Alexander Tatarsky
- Starring: Leonid Bronevoy
- Cinematography: Iosif Golomb
- Music by: Yury Chernavsky
- Distributed by: Soyuztelefilm; Studio Ekran
- Running time: 20 min 35 sec
- Country: Soviet Union
- Language: Russian

Investigation Led by Kolobki (Russian: Следствие ведут Колобки, also Investigation Led by Kolobki, translit. Sledstvie vedut kolobki) is a series of Soviet animated shorts by Alexander Tatarsky and Igor Kovalyov that were produced from 1986 to 1987.

The first two shorts were produced by Soyuztelefilm in 1986, whereas the third and fourth shorts were produced by Studio Ekran in 1987.

After the shorts were released, the Pilot Brothers duo came to be heavily used by Tatarskiy's studio, Pilot TV, particularly in the series The Fruttis Attic (Russian: Чердачок Фруттис) and The Academy of Our Mistaks (Russian: Академия собственных Ашибок) [sic].

The name of the series of shorts is a pun on a once-popular Soviet television series Investigation Led by Experts.

On August 9, 2018, a version of the cartoon with English dubbing was posted on the YouTube channel of the State Television and Radio Fund, a Russian state-owned organisation that manages the television archive of the programs produced by Soviet Central Television and other programs of the Soviet era.

== Plot summary ==
A foreign smuggler named Karbophos (a Soviet term for Malathion insecticide), under the guise of a tourist, steals a rare striped elephant—named Baldachin—from a city zoo in Berdychiv. Previously, Karbophos had been the owner of Baldachin, but due to his abuse of the elephant, it fled from him. The renowned Kolobki brothers—a detective duo—take up the investigation.

At a souvenir shop, Karbophos obtains a certificate for a porcelain elephant that he purchases (and then promptly breaks). He attempts to use said certificate to board a aeroplane with Baldachin.

However, the Kolobki brothers manage to arrive in the nick of time, and lure the elephant away with cod liver oil. Karbophos is eventually shot with a toy gun that shoots with ballons, and flies away. The Kolobki brothers and Baldachin (along with a turncoat ex-servant of Karbophos) then walk through the city.

== Voice cast ==
- Leonid Bronevoy as Chief (in the first two shorts)
- Mikhail Evdokimov as Chief (in the second two shorts)
- Aleksey Ptitsin as Colleague
- Stanislav Fedosov as all of the other characters
