= List of number-one hits of 1986 (Germany) =

This is a list of the German Media Control GfK International Top100 Singles Chart number-ones of 1986.

Key
†	Indicates best-performing single and album of 1986

Issue date	Song	Artist	Album	Artist
6 January	"Nikita"	Elton John	"Movin'" †	Jennifer Rush
13 January	"Jeanny" †	Falco	"Movin'" †	Jennifer Rush
20 January	"Jeanny" †	Falco	"Movin'" †	Jennifer Rush
27 January	"Jeanny" †	Falco	"Movin'" †	Jennifer Rush
3 February	"Jeanny" †	Falco	"Movin'" †	Jennifer Rush
10 February	"Jeanny" †	Falco	"Movin'" †	Jennifer Rush
17 February	"Jeanny" †	Falco	"Ahl Männer, aalglatt"	BAP
24 February	"Jeanny" †	Falco	"Ahl Männer, aalglatt"	BAP
3 March	"Jeanny" †	Falco	"Ahl Männer, aalglatt"	BAP
10 March	"Brother Louie"	Modern Talking	"Ahl Männer, aalglatt"	BAP
17 March	"Brother Louie"	Modern Talking	"Ahl Männer, aalglatt"	BAP
24 March	"Brother Louie"	Modern Talking	"Ahl Männer, aalglatt"	BAP
31 March	"Brother Louie"	Modern Talking	"Ahl Männer, aalglatt"	BAP
7 April	"Geil"	Bruce and Bongo	"Sprünge"	Herbert Grönemeyer
14 April	"Geil"	Bruce and Bongo	"Sprünge"	Herbert Grönemeyer
21 April	"Geil"	Bruce and Bongo	"Sprünge"	Herbert Grönemeyer
28 April	"Geil"	Bruce and Bongo	"Sprünge"	Herbert Grönemeyer
5 May	"Midnight Lady"	Chris Norman	"Sprünge"	Herbert Grönemeyer
12 May	"Midnight Lady"	Chris Norman	"Sprünge"	Herbert Grönemeyer
19 May	"Midnight Lady"	Chris Norman	"Sprünge"	Herbert Grönemeyer
26 May	"Midnight Lady"	Chris Norman	"Sprünge"	Herbert Grönemeyer
2 June	"Midnight Lady"	Chris Norman	"Sprünge"	Herbert Grönemeyer
9 June	"Midnight Lady"	Chris Norman	"Sprünge"	Herbert Grönemeyer
16 June	"Atlantis Is Calling (S.O.S. for Love)"	Modern Talking	"Ready for Romance"	Modern Talking
23 June	"Atlantis Is Calling (S.O.S. for Love)"	Modern Talking	"Ready for Romance"	Modern Talking
30 June	"Atlantis Is Calling (S.O.S. for Love)"	Modern Talking	"Ready for Romance"	Modern Talking
7 July	"Atlantis Is Calling (S.O.S. for Love)"	Modern Talking	"Ready for Romance"	Modern Talking
14 July	"Lessons in Love"	Level 42	"Ready for Romance"	Modern Talking
21 July	"Lessons in Love"	Level 42	"True Blue"	Madonna
28 July	"Lessons in Love"	Level 42	"True Blue"	Madonna
4 August	"Lessons in Love"	Level 42	"True Blue"	Madonna
11 August	"Lessons in Love"	Level 42	"True Blue"	Madonna
18 August	"Lessons in Love"	Level 42	"True Blue"	Madonna
25 August	"Holiday Rap"	Mc Miker G & Deejay Sven	"True Blue"	Madonna
1 September	"Holiday Rap"	Mc Miker G & Deejay Sven	"True Blue"	Madonna
8 September	"Holiday Rap"	Mc Miker G & Deejay Sven	"True Blue"	Madonna
15 September	"Holiday Rap"	Mc Miker G & Deejay Sven	"Top Gun"	Soundtrack
22 September	"Holiday Rap"	Mc Miker G & Deejay Sven	"Top Gun"	Soundtrack
29 September	"Rage Hard"	Frankie Goes to Hollywood	"Break Every Rule"	Tina Turner
6 October	"Rage Hard"	Frankie Goes to Hollywood	"Break Every Rule"	Tina Turner
13 October	"The Final Countdown"	Europe	"Break Every Rule"	Tina Turner
20 October	"The Final Countdown"	Europe	"Break Every Rule"	Tina Turner
27 October	"The Final Countdown"	Europe	"Break Every Rule"	Tina Turner
3 November	"The Final Countdown"	Europe	"Break Every Rule"	Tina Turner
10 November	"Coming Home (Jeanny Part II)"	Falco	"Emotional"	Falco
17 November	"Coming Home (Jeanny Part II)"	Falco	"Emotional"	Falco
24 November	"In the Army Now"	Status Quo	"Tabaluga und das leuchtende Schweigen"	Peter Maffay
1 December	"In the Army Now"	Status Quo	"In the Middle of Nowhere"	Modern Talking
8 December	"In the Army Now"	Status Quo	"Tabaluga und das leuchtende Schweigen"	Peter Maffay
15 December	"In the Army Now"	Status Quo	"Tabaluga und das leuchtende Schweigen"	Peter Maffay
22 December	"Walk Like an Egyptian"	The Bangles	"Break Every Rule"	Tina Turner
29 December	No release (Note: Same issue as for 22 December.)			

== See also ==
- List of number-one hits (Germany)
