= Grigory Tolchinsky =

- Григо́рий Толчи́нский
- Born: November 11, 1936
- Died: March 5, 1988 (aged 51); Moscow, USSR
- Citizenship: USSR
- Occupations: Actor, puppeteer
- Years active: 1955–1988

Grigory Yakovlevich Tolchinsky (Russian: Григо́рий Я́ковлевич Толчи́нский; November 11, 1936 – March 5, 1988, Moscow) was a Soviet theater and film actor. He gained fame voicing Filya in the children's television program Good Night, Little Ones!.

== Early life ==
He was born November 11, 1936. Lev was his brother.

== Career ==
In 1955–1958, Grigory Yakovlevich worked on the song and dance ensemble of the Northern Fleet of the USSR, and in 1958–1959, he was an artist of the Moscow Puppet Theater.

In 1959, he joined the State Central Puppet Theater under the direction of S. V. Obraztsov, where he worked until the end of his life.

In 1968–1988, Grigory Tolchinsky voiced Filya and Tsap-Tsarapych in the program Good Night, Little Ones!. He also participated in recording productions for records and radio.

== Legacy ==
He died in his sleep on March 5, 1988, at the age of 52 in Moscow.

He was buried at Vostryakovskoye Cemetery.

== Voice acting for cartoons ==
Year	Film	Role	Note
1966	An hour before goodbye (За час до свидания)	hairdresser	
1966	The Enchanted Word (Заколдованное слово)	Wolf	
1966	Mother for a baby mammoth (Мама для мамонтёнка)	Polar bear cub	
1966	Lost and Found (Бюро находок)	Tishka	
1966	Kubik and Tobik (Кубик и Тобик)	Tobik	
1966	Naida (Найда)	Naida	
1966	Doctor Aybolit (Доктор Айболи́т)	robber	
1966	Treasure Island (Остров Сокровищ)	"Black Dog"	
