= Andrei Svislotskiy =

- Directed by: Igor Kovalyov
- Screenplay by: Igor Kovalyov; Valery Pugashkin
- Produced by: Igor Gelashvili
- Cinematography: Oleg Kuzovkov
- Production company: Pilot
- Release date: 1991
- Running time: 18 minutes
- Countries: Soviet Union; Russia

Andrei Svislotskiy (Russian: Андрей Свислоцкий) is a 1991 animated short film by Russian animator Igor Kovalyov. The short focuses on the lives of three eccentric people living on a farm in the Ukrainian countryside.

== Plot ==
Told in a non-linear, stream of consciousness style, the film depicts the deceitful relationship between a master and his two servants. The master's actions and behavior are very mysterious and secretive, which causes his manservant to be suspicious of his whereabouts. The Master is seen doing such things as writing a letter in the secrecy of his study room, gathering eggs from the side of a cliff, and it is even implied he had an affair with the female servant. One day, the shocked manservant discovers the Master in a barn feeding the eggs he gathered to a huge boar, much to the Master's shame. Sometime later, the Master is shown setting the pig off into the wild, perhaps a form of reconciliation with the male servant (who is implied to have an infatuation with his master). With his mental health deteriorating, the Master sheds his clothing and jumps over the edge of the cliff, presumably to his death. Sometime after these events, the two servants are seen tending to the Master's now vacant bedroom, and appear to be going their separate ways. However, the manservant secretly follows the woman and watches aghast as she begins walking towards the same cliff the Master committed suicide on. What happens next is unclear, and the film ends with the following epilogue:

This all happened within 30 km of the city of Kiev in the town of Bucha.
I was the only witness of these events. – Andrey Svislotskiy

== Preservation ==
Andrei Svislotskiy was preserved by the Academy Film Archive in 2007.
