= Once Upon a Dog =

1982 animated short film by Eduard Nazarov

- Zhil-byl Pyos
- Genre: Animated cartoon
- Directed by: Eduard Nazarov
- Country of origin: Soviet Union
- Original language: Russian

Production
- Producer: Soyuzmultfilm
- Editor: Yelena Mikhaylova
- Running time: 11 minutes

Original release
- Release: 1982

Once Upon, a Dog (also Once Upon a Time, There Lived a Dog, Russian: «Жил-был пёс», romanized: Zhil-byl Pyos) is a Soviet animated short film adapted from the Ukrainian folk tale Sirko.

The cartoon won the first place at the 1983 International Film Festival in Odense and a special prize at the 1983 festival in Annecy.

== Plot ==
The day comes when an old watchdog becomes useless but the masters, being kind, decide not to drive him away. However, they become exasperated when the Dog is indifferent during a burglary. The Dog is kicked out and sprints to the forest, where he is left to fend for himself, alone, homesick and hungry. Too slow and unaccustomed to hunting prey, the Dog despairs and contemplates hanging himself from a tree. Tragedy is averted when he encounters an old wolf whom the Dog used to chase. The Wolf commiserates with the Dog, and the two hatch a plan. The next day, the Wolf stages a kidnapping of the baby belonging to the Dog's former masters. The Dog "rescues" the unharmed child and is welcomed back to the khutor (the farmstead). Winter comes and one evening the Dog hears the howl of the Wolf. The Dog remembers to repay the Wolf's kindness. He helps the Wolf enter the house where there is a wedding in progress and fetches him different kinds of food from the table. Becoming tipsy from the effects of a large meal, alcohol and a warm house, the Wolf starts to howl his "song." The wolf howls and is discovered, but the quick-thinking Dog saves him by 'chasing' him from the house. The Wolf thanks the Dog and the aging friends bid farewell.

The story reveals the problem of becoming old and useless. It appeals to everyone's ability for mutual readiness to help, despite past history.

== Credits ==
The cartoon repeatedly features the Ukrainian folk songs "Oi tam na hori" ("Oh, there at the mountain", performed by an ensemble from Solonytsia, Lubny Raion, Poltava Oblast), "Ta kosyv batko, kosyv ya" ("My father mowed, I mowed", performed by an ensemble from Iskivtsi, Lubny Raion, Poltava Oblast), and "Oi do boru stezhechka" ("Oh, there is a path to the pine barren", performed by the folk ensemble of Kyiv Conservatory). The Dog was voiced by Georgi Burkov and the Wolf by Armen Dzhigarkhanyan. Animators – Anatoly Abarenov, Natalia Bogomolova, Sergey Dezhkin, operator – Mikhail Druyan, sound producer – Andrey Filchikov.

A steel monument to the Wolf was placed in 2005 in Tomsk and a copy was made in 2007 in Angarsk. The monument is unofficially called "Monument to Happiness".
