= Geil (song) =

1986 disco song by Bruce and Bongo

Single by Bruce and Bongo

from the album The Geil Album
- Released: 1986
- Length: 3:55
- Label: Ariola
- Songwriter(s): Bruce Hammond Earlam
- Producer(s): Tim Green

Bruce and Bongo singles chronology
"Geil" (1986)	"Heigh Ho – Whistle While You Work" (1986)

"Geil" is a song released by the German-based British duo Bruce and Bongo. It charted in several European countries, making it their best performing release of any type. "Geil" was released as a single in 1986 and topped the Austrian charts that year. The song was Bruce and Bongo's only major hit, making the duo a one-hit wonder.

The song is considered a novelty song, with lyrics mostly in English. In German, the word "Geil" originally meant "horny" but by the 1980s had come to also mean "cool" or "awesome" in slang. For the older generation this sounded like a provocation, and it was meant to be one of course.

The song featured lyrics stating that everyone is cool/horny ("Everybody's geil, g-g-g-g-geil"). It also featured a section about the tennis player Boris Becker, claiming that "Boris is geil", and imitating a tennis umpire.

The music video accompanying the song featured Bruce and Bongo in a gym, with several elderly women doing exercises on various items of gym equipment. The music video is today generally considered to be cheesy and slightly camp, although this was probably done intentionally to give the video a novelty factor matching that of the song.

After the release of "Geil", Bruce and Bongo would release The Geil Album, although in comparison the album was a commercial failure. The refrain has the same melody as Rock Me Amadeus from the Austrian singer Falco.

== Track listings ==
7" single

1. "Geil" (Geilomatick Mix) – 3:55
2. "Geil Bruce & Bongo Dub" (New York Horny Mix) – 3:55

12" single

1. "Geil" (Geilomatick Mix) – 7:15
2. "Geil Bruce & Bongo Dub" (New York Horny Mix) – 7:15

== Charts ==
=== Weekly charts ===
Chart (1986)	Peak position
Austria (Ö3 Austria Top 40)	1
Belgium (Ultratop 50 Flanders)	16
Europe (European Hot 100 Singles)	28
Netherlands (Dutch Top 40)	15
Netherlands (Single Top 100)	13
Switzerland (Schweizer Hitparade)	7
West Germany (GfK)	1

=== Year-end charts ===
Chart (1986)	Position
Austria (Ö3 Austria Top 40)	8
West Germany (Media Control)	8

== Bruce and Bongo vs. Tony T. version ==
"Geil"

Single by Bruce and Bongo vs. Tony T.
- Released: 1998
- Length: 5:07
- Label: EAMS
- Songwriter(s): Bruce Hammond Earlam
- Producer(s): Marko Albrecht, Claus Hägele, M. Jaxon Bellina, Chr. Groote

Bruce and Bongo vs. Tony T. singles chronology
"We Ain't Back" (1992)	"Geil" (1998)

In 1998, Bruce and Bongo released a new recording of "Geil" with British rapper Tony T., which was not successful.

=== Track listings ===
CD single

1. "Geil" (Kurz und gut und Geil-Mix) – 5:07
2. "Geil" (Lang und gut und Geil-Mix) – 5:07
3. "Geil" (Letzter geiler-SOmmer-Mix) – 5:34
4. Bruce & Bongo - "Geil" (Das Original) – 4:01

== See also ==
- Lists of number-one singles (Austria)
- List of number-one hits of 1986 (Germany)
