= The New Adventures of Captain Wrongel =

- Directed by: Gennady Vasilyev
- Written by: Aleksandr Khmelik
- Starring: Mikhail Pugovkin; Zurab Kapianidze; Sergey Martinson; Vladimir Basov
- Cinematography: Gasan Tutunov
- Edited by: Valentina Isayeva
- Music by: Alexey Rybnikov
- Production company: Gorky Film Studio
- Release date: 1978
- Running time: 76 minutes
- Country: Soviet Union
- Language: Russian

The New Adventures of Captain Wrongel (Russian: Новые приключения капитана Врунгеля, romanized: Novye priklucheniya kapitana Vrungelya) is a 1978 Soviet children's musical Adventure film directed by Gennady Vasilyev loosely based on The Adventures of Captain Wrongel by Andrei Nekrasov.

== Plot ==
In middle school No. 12 in the city of Gurzuf, students in an English class are given an assignment by their teacher to write an essay on “How I Spent My Summer” ("The Summer Holiday"). Pioneer Vasya Lopotukhin, the protagonist of another future film, opens his notebook and begins to daydream, letting his imagination take over the storyline. His fantasies fill almost the entire plot of the film. In Vasya's vivid imagination, he envisions newspapers raising alarm over the mysterious disappearances of planes and ships in the Bermuda Triangle. Vasya decides that only the brave Captain Christopher Bonifatevich Vrungel, who has long since retired and works quietly as a pharmacist, can unravel the mystery. Vasya slyly leaves a book recounting Vrungel's past adventures in his kiosk and then visits his friend Lom, a former first mate now working as a bathhouse attendant, showing him newspapers about the Bermuda Triangle. Furious, Lom convinces Vrungel to embark on an expedition to uncover the mystery of the disappearances, and, after a bout of nostalgia, Vrungel agrees on the condition that Lom learns English within three days. When the day of departure arrives, Captain Vrungel delivers a speech but accidentally damages the side of his yacht, "Victory," causing the first two letters to fall off, transforming its name to "Trouble." Vasya sneaks aboard to join the expedition, and Vrungel, after a heartfelt conversation about Vasya's dream of becoming a sailor, agrees to let him stay as the cabin boy.

However, the expedition catches the attention of an elderly businessman and president of the foreign "Want and Sons Company," Sir Want, who fears Vrungel's voyage threatens his corporation's survival. Want and his assistant, Block Silent, hire their agent, the ruthless Harry, to eliminate the yacht along with its crew. Disguised as an old man, Harry is rescued by Vrungel and Lom in the middle of the ocean, but Vasya, suspecting foul play, uncovers his true identity just as Harry is about to sabotage the ship. Angered by his failure, Sir Want orders Harry to pursue "Trouble" to the Arabian Peninsula, where Harry, dressed as a snake charmer, causes a commotion that forces the crew to flee from the enraged merchants. Despite several attempts by Harry to disrupt the journey, Vrungel, Lom, and Vasya persevere, eventually reaching Sir Want's city, where they discover a soulless metropolis filled only with machines, pollution, and artificial nature. Sir Want tries to purchase their yacht, but Vrungel refuses, and Vasya realizes that Want's intentions are malicious. In a final act of resistance, Vasya destroys a crucial device, flooding the corporation with foam, driving Sir Want mad. Vrungel's crew sails onward to solve the Bermuda Triangle's mystery, encountering strange phenomena until they are transported back to a TV studio where Vasya, now a renowned scientist, explains the disappearances as an elaborate hoax by Want's corporation. The story concludes with Vasya winning the respect and affection of his classmate Katya, who had previously doubted his tales. Just as the English class ends, Vasya's notebook contains only one sentence: "The sea laughed..." — leaving his classmates, especially Katya, in amused disbelief.

== Cast ==
- Mikhail Pugovkin - Captain Wrongel
- Zurab Kapianidze - Assistant to Captain Lom
- Sergey Martinson - Sir Vant, bandit leader
- Vladimir Basov - Block Silent
- Savely Kramarov - Fierce Harry, agent-gangster
- Arkady Markin - Vasya Lopotukhin
- Ksenia Turchan - Katya Malakhova
- Rudolf Rudin - Seraphim Nazhdak, reporter

== See also ==
Adventures of Captain Wrongel, The source material
