= Plasticine Crow =

1981 film by Alexander Tatarsky

- Directed by: Alexander Tatarsky
- Written by: Alexander Kushner; Ovsey Driz; Eduard Uspensky
- Screenplay by: Alexander Tatarsky
- Produced by: Alexander Tatarsky
- Starring: Leonid Bronevoy; Grigory Gladkov; Lev Shimelov
- Cinematography: Ernst Gaman
- Edited by: Lyubov Georgieva
- Music by: Grigory Gladkov
- Distributed by: Studio Ekran
- Release date: August 6, 1981
- Running time: 8 min 57 s
- Country: Soviet Union
- Language: Russian

Plasticine Crow (Russian: Пластилиновая ворона, translit. Plastilinovaya vorona) is a 1981 Soviet clay animation by Alexander Tatarsky (T/O Ekran studio). Animation divided into three independent parts (Picture, Game and But maybe, but maybe...). The film was Russia's first claymation film.

== Plot synopsis ==
=== Picture ===
The first part tells kids about the three painting styles – landscape, still life and portrait.

Lyrics for the first part were written by Alexander Kushner and sung by Grigory Gladkov, who also composed whole cartoon.

=== Game ===
The second part features the story of grandpa and his nephew playing the children game where the players periodically opens and shuts their eyes. And every time they are amazed with looking to something new in front of them.

This part was based on lyrics by Ovsey Driz and performed by Leonid Bronevoy and Alesha Pavlov.

=== But maybe, but maybe... ===
The final part is a parody of The Crow and the Fox, best known in Russian with the version by Krylov. The storytellers (Lev Shimelov and Alexander Levenbuk) can't remember the story plot, and they are trying to recall it.

Thus, instead of the crow from Krylov's story, a dog appears, and then a cow, and even a hippopotamus. The original fox is also replaced by an ostrich and then by a street cleaner.

At the end of the entirely distorted fable, a distorted moral is given: Don't stand and don't jump, don't sing and don't dance where there is construction in progress or heavy load hanging. (This is a pun on the two common Russian danger signs – "Don't stand under heavy load" and "Beware! Construction works in progress!").

The lyrics for the third part were written by Eduard Uspensky.

== Voice cast ==
- Leonid Bronevoy
- Grigory Gladkov
- Lev Shimelov
- Alexander Levenbuk
- Alesha Pavlov

== Censorship ==
At the time of release, the Soviet state officials wanted to ban the film because of (what they described) "ideological nonsense". Nevertheless, head of Kinopanorama television programme Xeniya Marinina and host and film director Eldar Ryazanov managed to show cartoon in one of editions of Kinopanorama on Soviet Central Television, bypassing the censorship.

== Production ==
- Creation of the film required about 800 kg of soviet plasticine. Because of withered colors the plasticine was dye-colored.
- The music in the third part of the film was intended to sound in the ordinary tempo, but its total length appeared to be longer than the animation created (8 minutes instead of 5). While Tatarskiy was in doubt, the voices arrived. Then the genius decision came when Tatarsky remembered how the gramophone-recorded voice of Lenin was restored by varying speed of phonation. He griped the recording to the necessary length (5 min), and the song acquired its recognisable sounding.
- The music in the third part is borrowing heavily from the Irish folk song Whiskey in the Jar. The beginning of the second verse of the song ("Но тут лиса бежала...") in this part is based on George Harrison's song My Sweet Lord.
