= Sirko =

Ukrainian folk tale

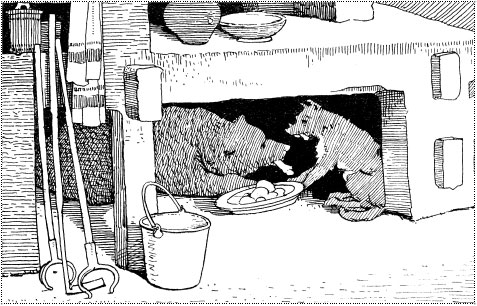
- Sirko, Ukrainian folk tale

Folk tale
- Name: Sirko
- Region: Ukraine

"Sirko" (Ukrainian: «Сірко») is a Ukrainian folk tale (kazka) about a friendship between an old dog and a wolf.

== Plot summary ==
The father of a family with a dog named Sirko casts the dog out after many years. Sirko the dog, wandered a field in despair reflecting on his many years of service to the family, and how after all those years he was cast out with only a piece of bread. While wandering, Sirko the dog encounters a wolf who asks him what he is doing, to which the Sirko explains that his owner has chased him away. The wolf asks if Sirko would like his owners to take him back, to which Sirko says he would thank the wolf if he could do so.

Sirko listens to the wolf's plan. The wolf tells that when the father goes out with the mother to harvest their crop, she puts their child in a ditch while they work in the field. The wolf tells Sirko that he will take the child from the ditch while the parents are working, and when the wolf sees Sirko, the wolf will pretend to be afraid of Sirko and release the child. Sirko and the wolf do just that, which is witnessed by the man and woman, who reward the dog with bread and lard. Furthermore in the evening, they bring Sirko home with them and lavish the dog with a rich meal of buckwheat dumplings mashed with lard, providing Sirko special treatment. Sirko remembers that the wolf has done a good thing for him and wants to thank him.

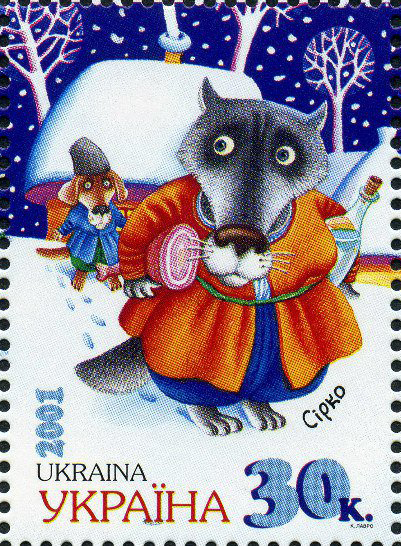
Postal stamp featuring Ukrainian fable Sirko, Ukrainian national post office, Ukrposhta, 2001

Soon, a wedding celebration is held for the family's eldest daughter, which includes a large feast. Sirko goes to the field and tells him that he will take the wolf into the house as a thank you for what the wolf has done. When the time came for the wedding feast, Sirko did as promised, and brought the wolf into the house under the table. The wolf complains that it is very thirsty, and needs to drink something immediately. Sirko is reluctant but does as the wolf asks for and takes a bottle from the table for the wolf. In some versions, the bottle is wine, and in others vodka. When people at the wedding feast notice Sirko the dog taking food and drink off the table, they want to beat it, but the father of the family tells them not to, because Sirko had done a good thing, and that they would treat him well as long as he lived. Sirko continues bringing the wolf hiding under the table food and drink until the wolf is so happy that it wants to sing.

Sirko plies the wolf with more food and drink trying to keep him quiet, but eventually the wolf can contain himself no more. The wolf lets out a howl of happiness. The family and the wedding guests at the party hear the wolf's howl, and then see the wolf under the table. Frightened, the wedding guests want to beat the wolf in defense. Sirko, seeing the commotion that has been caused, then lays down on the wolf trying to quiet him down from his howling. The father of the family sees Sirko laying near the wolf. The father of the house tells the wedding guests not to hit the wolf, because they could kill Sirko, and that Sirko himself will take care of the wolf.

To the relief of those in the house, Sirko takes the wolf out of the house into the field. Sirko tells the wolf they have now both done each other a favor, following which the wolf and Sirko part ways.

== In popular culture ==
=== Adaptations ===
- Based on the Ukrainian folk tale, the popular 1982 Soviet cartoon animation, Once Upon a Dog, (Once Upon a Time, There Lived a Dog, Russian: Жил-был пёс, romanized: Zhyl-byl pyos, Ukrainian: Жив-був пес, romanized: Zhyv-buv pes) was created by Moscow's Soyuzmultfilm studio.
- Sirko was featured on a postal stamp of the Ukrainian national post office, Ukrposhta, in 2001.
