= Mailen Konstantinovsky =

Mailen Aronovich Konstantinovsky
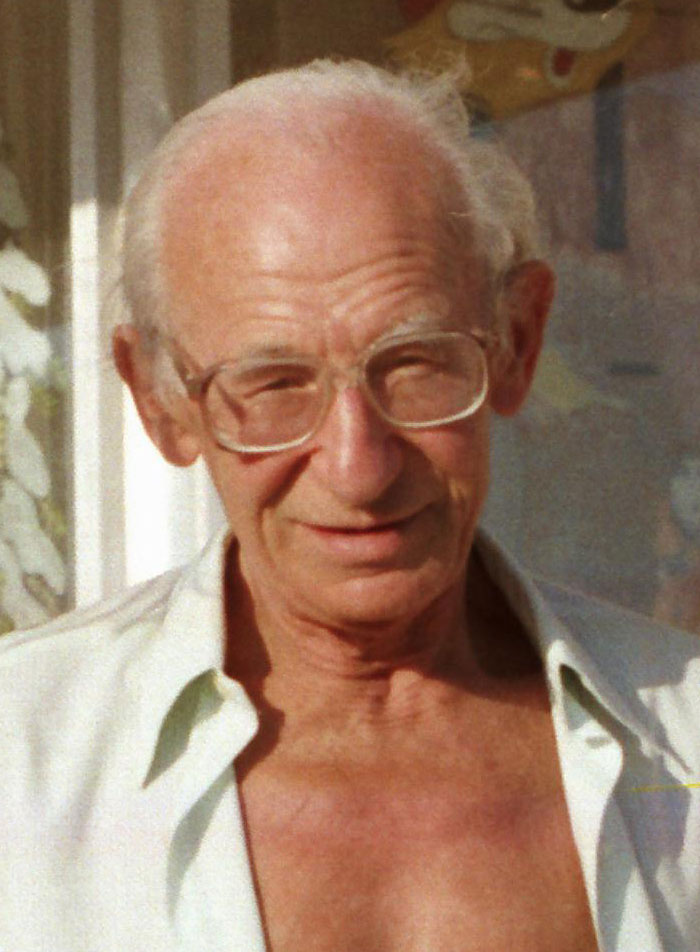
- Konstantinovsky in Gelendzhik (1995)
- Born: May 1, 1926; Tashkent, Uzbek SSR, Soviet Union
- Died: July 19, 2002 (aged 76); Moscow, Russia
- Education: Leningrad Higher Engineering Marine School named after Admiral S. O. Makarov
- Occupations: Journalist, science writer, screenwriter
- Writing career
- Notable work: KOAPP
- Notable awards: State Prize of the Russian Federation (1998)

Mailen Aronovich Konstantinovsky (Russian: Майлен Аронович Константиновский; 1 May 1926 – 19 July 2002) was a Russian journalist, science writer, screenwriter, and author of popular science books for children. He is best known as the creator of KOAPP, a children's popular science series exploring bionics and ecology, originally a radio program later adapted into books, audio recordings, film, and television. In 1999, Konstantinovsky was awarded the State Prize of the Russian Federation for the KOAPP cycle.

== Early life and education ==
Konstantinovsky was born on 1 May 1926 in Tashkent. His father served in the military, and his mother was a physician.

From an early age, he developed an interest in natural history and collected books about animals and plants, including the multi-volume zoological encyclopedia Brehms Tierleben (Russian: Жизнь животных, lit. 'Animal Life') by Alfred Brehm.

In 1949, Konstantinovsky graduated from the Leningrad Higher Engineering Marine School named after Admiral S. O. Makarov as an engineer-acoustician. He subsequently worked as a radio engineer aboard the research vessels Sergey Vavilov and Pyotr Lebedev, which were constructed for the Acoustics Institute of the Academy of Sciences of the USSR, a division of the Lebedev Physical Institute (FIAN). During this period, he also contributed short articles and notes to the naval newspaper Strazh Baltiki ("Guardian of the Baltic").

== Career ==
=== Writing ===
After working as a radio engineer aboard research vessels of the Academy of Sciences, Konstantinovsky turned to journalism in 1962.

He subsequently collaborated with the popular-science magazines Znanie — Sila ("Knowledge is Power") and Nauka i Zhizn ("Science and Life"). In 1966, he published his first book for children, Osobyy kamen ("The Special Stone"), a popular science work about magnets and magnetism, including the history of their discovery and contemporary scientific development.

Konstantinovsky first became known for his contributions to the children's popular science series Pochemuchkiny knizhki ("Little Why Books"), published by Malysh Publishers. His books in the series included O tom kak ustroen atom ("How the Atom Is Structured"), Pochemu voda mokraya? ("Why Is Water Wet?"), Pochemu zemlya — magnit? ("Why Is the Earth a Magnet?"), and Kak tkani tkut i niti pletut ("How Fabrics Are Woven and Threads Are Made"). These works introduced young readers to scientific concepts through accessible explanations, illustrations, and descriptions of simple experiments.

=== KOAPP ===
==== Radio series ====
In 1964, Konstantinovsky created the Soviet children's radio program, KOAPP (Russian: КОАПП. Репортаж о событиях невероятных, lit. 'KOAPP, Report on Incredible Events'). The KOAPP radio plays were broadcast weekly by All-Union Radio, with 162 episodes produced between 1964 and 1973.

The project was built around the fictional Committee for the Protection of the Rights of Nature (Russian: Комитет охраны авторских прав природы (КОАПП)), whose members were representatives of the animal and plant world. The program introduced young listeners to bionics, an interdisciplinary field at the intersection of biology, physics, chemistry, and engineering that studies the application of natural principles to technology. In preparing the material, Konstantinovsky consulted leading biologists and drew on his own experience working on research vessels. He incorporated feedback from his listeners and used the interests of his audience when selecting topics.

The program became popular among Soviet children and received letters from listeners across the country. Konstantinovsky initially answered the letters himself and later involved expert biologists to assist with responses.

Researchers have identified KOAPP as part of a children's Soviet radio tradition designed with attention to child psychology and child-oriented dramaturgy to foster engagement and promote intellectual inquiry.

In 1999, Konstantinovsky was awarded the State Prize of the Russian Federation for the KOAPP cycle.

==== Book series ====
Between 1970 and 1978, Konstantinovsky reworked material from the radio plays into a series of eight illustrated books published by Iskusstvo Publishing House. Motivated by the popularity of the broadcasts, he adapted the scripts for print publication while retaining the characters and educational themes of the original series. The books were illustrated by award-winning Soyuzmultfilm animators, Vladimir Zuikov and Eduard Nazarov.

==== Audio recordings ====
Selected KOAPP episodes were released between 1969 and 1983 as four LP vinyl records by the Melodiya record company, featuring scripts and songs written by Konstantinovsky and music by collaborators including Mikhail Tanich, Vladimir Shainsky and Vladimir Shchukin.

==== Animated films ====
Between 1984 and 1990, the creative association Studio Ekran produced a series of 18 puppet animated films based on the earlier KOAPP radio series and stories created by Konstantinovsky, who participated directly in the development of the scripts for the animated adaptations. Directed by Honored Artist of the Russian Federation Maria Muat, the films featured performances by actors including Olga Ostroumova, Lyudmila Gnilova, Vsevolod Abdulov, Georgy Vitsin, Yury Puzyryov, Aleksandr Burmistrov, Vyacheslav Nevinny, and Semyon Farada. More than 100 puppets were produced and are now held in the collections of the State Central Film Museum.

==== Television adaptations ====
In 1998, Konstantinovsky proposed reviving KOAPP for television. The idea that was subsequently adopted by ORT, which broadcast a live-action children's educational entertainment program titled KOAPP, produced by TV Company "Class!". Based on Konstantinovsky's original concept, the program presented animals as characters portrayed by actors. The cast included Vyacheslav Nevinny, Alexander Lenkov, and other well-known performers. The program consisted of 16 episodes and received the TEFI television award in 2001 in the category "Children's Program."

The work was interrupted by Konstantinovsky's death in 2002.

== Later years and death ==
Konstantinovsky died in Moscow on 19 July 2002, at the age of 76. He was buried at Novodevichy Cemetery in Moscow. His gravestone includes the abbreviation KOAPP and an image of the Secretary Bird, the character whose call traditionally opened and closed KOAPP committee meetings.

== Legacy ==
Konstantinovsky's work continued to attract audiences and scholarly attention after his death through new adaptations, exhibitions, rebroadcasts, and critical analysis.

=== "KOAPP 20 Years Later" animated series ===
Between 2007 and 2016, the animated series was extended with drawn films directed by animation artists Irina Margolina and Anatoly Tur.

=== "Attention! KOAPP Speaks and Shows!" exhibition ===
In 2015, the State Darwin Museum presented the exhibition Attention! KOAPP Speaks and Shows! (Russian: Внимание! Говорит и показывает КОАПП!), organized together with the State Central Museum of Cinema and the Moscow Museum of Animation as part of the Year of Literature in Russia.

=== Rebroadcast ===
In 2019, the entire radio cycle was rebroadcast in its original format by Radio Russii.

=== Scholarly assessment ===
Tatyana V. Potapova, Doctor of Biological Sciences and leading researcher at the Moscow State University, described Konstantinovsky as an important figure in transmitting cultural, linguistic, and scientific heritage to younger generations. She argued that his body of work should be further studied, preserved, and recognized as a contribution to Russian and world culture. Potapova also highlighted Konstantinovsky's role in ecological education, noting that he presented the relationship between humans and nature as one of understanding and partnership. Through animal characters and adventure narratives, his works conveyed scientific ideas in an accessible form and portrayed the natural world as a source of knowledge and discovery, encouraging respect for the environment.

Australian literary critic Elena Mihailik examines the broader cultural significance of Konstantinovsky's work, noting that KOAPP incorporated into its bionic framework not only canonical and alternative texts, but also broader elements of contemporary culture. She argues that the program allowed space for ideas that diverged from official ideological positions and sometimes created the impression of existing outside the dominant political discourse of the Soviet period.

== Selected works ==
- Osobyy kamen (Особый камень; "The Special Stone"). Moscow: Detskaya literatura, 1966.
- KOAPP! KOAPP! KOAPP! (КОАПП! КОАПП! КОАПП!). 8 vols. Moscow: Iskusstvo, 1969–1978.
- Priklyucheniya morskogo shchenka (Приключения морского щенка; "Adventures of a Sea Puppy"). 1973.
- O tom, kak rabotaet atom (О том, как работает атом; "How the Atom Works"). 1974.
- Ishchu sebya (Ищу себя; "Searching for Myself"). Moscow: Znanie, 1975.
- Pochemu voda mokraya? (Почему вода мокрая?; "Why Is Water Wet?"). 1976.
- O tom, kak ustroen atom (О том, как устроен атом; "How the Atom Is Structured"). 1978.
- Pochemu zemlya — magnit? (Почему земля — магнит?; "Why Is the Earth a Magnet?"). 1979.
- Khochesh byt khudozhnikom? (Хочешь быть художником?; "Do You Want to Be an Artist?"). 1979.
- Vot kakie khitryetsy! (Вот какие хитрецы!; "What Clever Tricks!"). 1982.
- Kholodno, tepleye, goryacho! (Холодно, теплее, горячо!; "Cold, Warmer, Hot!"). 1982.
- Ishchu sebya: Kniga o professiyakh (Ищу себя: Книга о профессиях; "Searching for Myself: A Book About Professions"). 1984.
- Kak tkani tkut i niti pletut (Как ткани ткут и нити плетут; "How Fabrics Are Woven and Threads Are Made"). 1984.
- Pyat tainstvennykh Ka (Пять таинственных «Ка»; "Five Mysterious Ka"). Moscow: Iskusstvo, 1990.
- Kto risuet na ekrane? (Кто рисует на экране?; "Who Draws on the Screen?"). 1991.
- Skazki KOAPPovskogo lesa (Сказки КОАППовского леса; "Tales of the KOAPP Forest"). Moscow: Iskatel, 1998.
