= State Television and Radio Fund =

Russian media archive from 1974

- Государственный фонд телевизионных и радиопрограмм Gosudastvennyy fond televizionnykh i radioprogramm

Agency overview
- Formed: 12 April 1974; 52 years ago
- Jurisdiction: Russian Federation
- Headquarters: Ostankino Technical Center, Moscow; 55°49′13″N 37°36′16″E
- Agency executive: Alexander Shafinsky, Director
- Parent agency: All-Russia State Television and Radio Broadcasting Company
- Website: gtrf.ru

The State Television and Radio Fund, (Russian: Государственный фонд телевизионных и радиопрограмм, romanized: Gosudastvennyy fond televizionnykh i radioprogramm) also known as the Gosteleradiofond (Russian: Гостелерадиофонд) is a Russian archive that is a branch of the Federal State Unitary Enterprise, the All-Russia State Television and Radio Broadcasting Company (VGTRK). The Gosteleradiofond archives television and radio broadcasting programs that were recorded before 1999.

The materials of the fund reflect the history, culture, and art of the Soviet Union in the 20th century. The collection of the Gosteleradiofond, in terms of its volume and variety of genres, has more than three million items in storage.

== History ==
In 1974-1991, as a state institution, the All-Union Fund of Television and Radio Programs "Teleradiofond" was subordinate to the State Committee of Television and Radio Broadcasting of the Soviet Union. It carried out archiving of phonograms, video phonograms and television films both of its own production by Studio Ekran / TPO "Soyuztelefilm" and produced by television and film studios by order of Studio Ekran / TPO "Soyuztelefilm"). Soon after the creation of the All-Union State Television and Radio Broadcasting Company on 8 February 1991, it became subordinate to it.

In connection with the abolition of the All-Union State Television and Radio Broadcasting Company on 7 May 1992, it was transferred to the State Television and Radio Broadcasting Company "Ostankino". During this period, the archiving of broadcasts for re-broadcasting by both the Directorate of Television Programs of the Russian State Television and Radio Broadcasting Company Ostankino and the Studio Radio 1, as well as other state and commercial broadcasting organizations, continued: AK Aktsept (produced broadcasts under the television program M-49), MNVK and the firm TV Channel 2x2.

In December 1993, the State Television and Radio Fund was transferred to the direct subordination of the Federal Service for Television and Radio Broadcasting, however, until 7 May 1994, the regulations on the FSTR were not adopted for a long time and the fund continued to be financed jointly with the television and radio company, and on 13 December 1995, its charter was approved. Between 15 January 1998 and 8 December 2013, the State Television and Radio Broadcasting Fund was included in the State Collection of Particularly Valuable Objects of Cultural Heritage of the Peoples of the Russian Federation. At the same time, archiving of the Ostankino Central Television/RGTRK broadcasts continued for subsequent broadcasting on various state and private television channels (primarily ORT/Channel One, Channel 31 and Kultura).

On 9 December 2013, Decree of the President of the Russian Federation No. 894 "On Certain Measures to Improve the Efficiency of State Mass Media" was published, providing for the liquidation of the "State Fund of Television and Radio Programs" with the transfer of its functions and property to the Federal State Unitary Enterprise "All-Russian State Television and Radio Broadcasting Company" (VGTRK). The transfer procedure was completed on 1 July 2014, and at the same time, the State Television and Radio Broadcasting Fund became a branch of the Federal State Unitary Enterprise VGTRK.

On 15 November 2017, YouTube channels were opened, on which GTRF materials began to be uploaded from 18 December ("Soviet Television" and "Soviet Radio"). On 30 September 2020, the channels "Soviet Humor" and "Soviet Films and Performances" were created. On 26 September 2019, the channel "Soviet Television" was awarded the silver YouTube button. On 20 March 2018, an official channel was created in Telegram. As of the end of 2021, the channel has 2.5 million subscribers and about 770 million views. On the night of 11-12 March 2022, YouTube blocked the channels "Soviet Television. State Television and Radio Broadcasting Fund" and "Soviet Radio. Gosteleradiofond". On 23 March, both YouTube channels were unblocked.
