= Chocolate (Choco Choco) =

2004 single by Soul Control

Single by Soul Control

from the album Here We Go
- Released: 2004
- Genre: Pop; bubblegum pop; Eurodance
- Label: BMG
- Songwriters: Bruce Hammond Earlam; Ned Irving
- Producers: Bruce Hammond Earlam; Ned Irving

Soul Control singles chronology
"Chocolate (Choco Choco)" (2004)	"Baila Loco" (2004)

"Chocolate (Choco Choco)" is the debut single by German pop duo Soul Control, released in 2004 from their debut album Here We Go. The song was written and produced by Bruce Hammond Earlam and Ned Irving. The refrain interpolates parts of "La Bamba".

A New Mixes maxi CD with multilingual remixes was also released which included versions in Spanish, French and German to increase the song's appeal. The song was a top 5 hit in Germany, Austria and Switzerland and also made number 25 on the UK Singles Chart. In 2007, a Japanese version was released under the title "Oideyo Goringo" (おいでよゴリンゴ) and was the main theme of the FujiTV production Ponkikki. In Germany, their sales exceeded gold status and in the Philippines, exceeded platinum.

== Style and composition ==
This song is predominantly high-energy dance-pop and Eurodance track that incorporates prominent elements of Latin pop, Ragga, and Pop rap. Set to a fast-paced electronic beat, the song is characterized by its simplistic, repetitive lyrical structure and "call-and-response" segments designed for audience participation. The refrain famously interpolates parts of the traditional folk song "La Bamba". The track is composed in the key of D major with a fast-paced tempo of 154 beats per minute. It is built around a heavy 4/4 dance rhythm and bright, synthesized brass sections intended to evoke a Latin carnival atmosphere. Vocally, the song avoids traditional melodic singing in favor of rhythmic chanting and staccato delivery. The verses, performed by members Leo Buck and Tom Quella, utilize a "ragga-lite" style—a commercialized version of dancehall—paired with lighthearted lyrics regarding the universal appeal of chocolate.

== Sugarpop version ==
"Chocolate"

Song by Sugarpop

from the album Sugarpop
- Released: 13 August 2007
- Recorded: 2007
- Genre: Pop
- Length: 3:19
- Label: Sony BMG
- Songwriters: Bruce Hammond-Earlam, Ned Irving
- Producer: Danny Tan

"Chocolate" is a song recorded by the Filipino pop group Sugarpop, released in 2007 as part of their self-titled debut album Sugarpop. The song is a Tagalog-language cover of "Chocolate (Choco Choco)", originally performed by Soul Control.

The group performed the song during the launch of their debut album, where it was described as a Tagalog version of the dance track.

== SpongeBob version ==
"Schokolade"

Song by SpongeBob SquarePants

from the album Das SuperBob Album
- Released: 13 February 2015
- Length: 3:11
- Label: Sony Music Entertainment Germany
- Songwriters: Bruce Hammond Earlam, Ned Irving
- Producers: Bruce Hammond Earlam, Ned Irving

Music video
- "Schokolade" music video on YouTube

A German-language version of "Chocolate (Choco Choco)" by Soul Control titled "Schokolade" was released in 2015 as part of Das SuperBob Album, a music album featuring parody and cover versions performed under the branding of SpongeBob SquarePants. The song adapts the composition of the original track with newly written German lyrics.

The album version features vocals by the German dubbing cast of the series, including Santiago Ziesmer as SpongeBob.

== Track listings ==
CD maxi single

1. "Chocolate (Choco Choco)" (single version) – 3:16
2. "Chocolate (Choco Choco)" (extended version) – 4:06
3. "Chocolate (Choco Choco)" (Soul Control Having Fun with Ersin & Börek) – 3:23
4. "Chocolate (Choco Choco)" (Sexy Dance mix) – 4:18
5. "Fiesta" – 3:26

New Mixes

1. "Chocolate (Choco Choco)" (Have a Good Time mix) – 3:17
2. "Chocolate (Choco Choco)" (Spanish version) – 3:16
3. "Chocolate (Choco Choco)" (French version) – 3:17
4. "Chocolate (Choco Choco)" (Oktoberfest mix) – 3:37
5. "Chocolate (Choco Choco)" (karaoke version) – 3:17
6. "Chocolate (Choco Choco)" (instrumental) – 3:16

"Oideyo Goringo"

1. おいでよゴリンゴ (日本語ラップ ver.) / OIDEYO GORINGO (NIHONGO RAP VER.)
2. おいでよゴリンゴ (英語ラップ ver.1) / OIDEYO GORINGO (EIGO RAP VER.1)
3. おいでよゴリンゴ (英語ラップ ver.2) / OIDEYO GORINGO (EIGO RAP VER.2)
4. おいでよ ゴリンゴ (インスト) / OIDEYO GORINGO (INST)
5. おいでよ ゴリンゴ (ユーロビート・リミックス) / OIDEYO GORINGO (EUROBEAT REMIX)
6. おいでよ ゴリンゴ (アニメーション ver.) (video)
7. おいでよ ゴリンゴ (振り付けダンス ver.) (video)

== Charts ==
=== Weekly charts ===
Weekly chart performance for "Chocolate (Choco Choco)"
Chart (2004)	Peak position
Austria (Ö3 Austria Top 40)	2
Germany (GfK)	5
Switzerland (Schweizer Hitparade)	3
UK Singles (OCC)	25

=== Year-end charts ===
Year-end chart performance for "Chocolate (Choco Choco)"
Chart (2004)	Position
Austria (Ö3 Austria Top 40)	13
Germany (GfK)	25
Switzerland (Schweizer Hitparade)	23
