= Andrey Sokolov (animator) =

Russian animation director (1974–2025)

Andrey Sokolov

Andrey Nikolayevich Sokolov (Russian: Андрей Николаевич Соколов; 1 April 1974 – 14 July 2025) was a Russian animation director, screenwriter and production designer.

== Life and career ==
Sokolov was born in Moscow on 1 April 1974. In 1995 he graduated from the animation courses of the animation studio "Pilot". In 1998, he graduated from the State Academy of Household Sciences with a degree in furniture production as a process engineer. From 1995 to 2000 he worked as an animator and storyboard artist at the Pilot studio. Later, in 2001, he made his directorial debut with the cartoon Latex.

In 2003 he graduated from the Gerasimov Institute of Cinematography at the Faculty of Additional Education (Department of Animation Film Directing).

Sokolov died on 14 July 2025, at the age of 51.
