= AMBA (animated film) =

- Film poster
- Directed by: Gennady Tischchenko
- Written by: Gennady Tischenko
- Starring: Lyudmila Gnilova; Vsevolod Abdulov; Aleksandr Luschik
- Music by: Senya Son
- Production companies: Tvorcheskoye ob"yedineniye «Ekran» Studiya mul'tiplikatsionnykh telefil'mov
- Release dates: 1994 (Part 1); 1995 (Part 2)
- Running time: 8 min + 10 min
- Country: Russia

AMBA (Russian: АМБА) is a two-part Russian animated science fiction film made in 1994–1995 by animator Gennady Tishchenko.

It is the last part of the unfinished space opera cartoon saga under the working title Star World which consisted of Vampires of Geon and Masters of Geon.

== Plot ==
Scientists during the Martian experiment AMBA over the course of a week have grown the settlement AMBA (automorphic bioarchitectural assemblage), from biomass in the Martian desert, which allows more than one million people to live.

The project AMBA-2 is completed on the planet Mirra in the Karnak system, which is headed by the bioarchitect Harper. Biomass growth is controlled by the genetically transformed brain of Rex's dog, who died when saving his mistress, Julia. A week after the beginning of the experiment, the connection is interrupted, and then envoy Julia flies to the planet and meets Rex, who tells that everything went well at first, but then as a result of the absorption of local silicon organisms began mutations caused by flint viruses.

As a result, Harper receives a lethal dose of radiation. Rex severs his head, connects it to an autonomous life support system, and creates several Harper clones so that earth scientists can attach Harper's head to the body of one of them.

Harper says that the title of the project has a second meaning — the end of technological civilization.

People fly to Earth, and planet Mirra follows on a journey which may take thousands of years.
