= Zurab Kapianidze =

Georgian actor, philologist, and politician

Zurab Kapianidze (Georgian: ზურაბ ქაფიანიძე; April 1, 1937 – July 4, 2011) was a Georgian theater and film actor and philologist. He was also a member of the Parliament of Georgia from 1999 to 2003.

Born in the village of Nakieti in the highland province of Racha, Zurab Kapianidze graduated from Tbilisi State Theater Institute in 1961 and performed at the Meskhishvili Theater in Kutaisi from 1961 to 1964, when he moved to Tbilisi to join the Kartuli Pilmi film studio. He starred in 43 films produced by this studio. He was awarded the title of People's Artist of the Georgian SSR in 1979 and the Shota Rustaveli Prize in 1985.

Kapianidze was also engaged in the research of ancient alphabets. His ideas regarding the origin of the Georgian alphabet have not to date been taken seriously by the Georgian academic establishment. His book, published in 1990, claimed that the Georgian alphabet was among the first writing systems in the world and attached cosmic-astronomic significance to it. From 1999 to 2003 Kapianidze was elected to the Parliament of Georgia as a non-party member running on the ticket of the block Aghordzineba ("Revival of Georgia") chaired by Aslan Abashidze.

Zurab Kapianidze was buried at the Didube Pantheon in Tbilisi.

== Selected filmography ==
- Don't Grieve (1969)
- Pirosmani (1969)
- The New Adventures of Captain Wrongel (1978)
