= Natalya Marchenkova =

Soviet and Ukrainian animator, artist and animation director (born 1948)

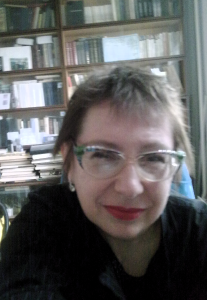
- Marchenkova in 2011
- Born: 1 June 1948 (age 77); Kiev, Ukrainian SSR, Soviet Union (now Kyiv, Ukraine)
- Years active: 1967–2012
- Employer(s): Kievnauchfilm and its successors (1967–2006)
- Known for: animation
- Spouse: David Cherkassky

Natalya Semyonovna Marchenkova (Ukrainian: Марченкова Наталя Семенівна; born 1948) is a Soviet and Ukrainian animator and animation director.

== Biography ==
Marchenkova was born on 1 June 1948 in Kyiv, Ukrainian SSR.

From 1967 until 2006, she worked at Kievnauchfilm, an animation studio. Starting in 1985, she worked, as an animation director. She retired from animation and directing in 2012.

She was married to film director and screenwriter David Cherkassky (1931–2018).

== Filmography ==
=== Director ===
- 1985 — How The Hedgehog and The Bear Cub Changed The Sky (Как Ёжик и Медвежонок небо меняли)
- 1987 — Essay About Grandfather (Сочинение про дедушку)
- 1989 — What is this?! (Это что ещё такое?!)
- 1989 — My Family (Моя семья)
- 1990 — Love and Death of Ordinary Potatoes (Любовь и смерть картошки обыкновенной)
- 1992 — We are men! (Мы — мужчины!)
- 1992 — Found (Найдёныш)
- 1995 — Julia's birthday (День рождения Юлии)
- 1996 — Mitten (Рукавичка)
- 1999 — The Iron Wolf (Железный волк; co-directed with Pedan Oleg Igorovich)
- 2000 — Airplane Lip (Самолётик Лип)
- 2004 — The War of Apples and Caterpillars (Война яблок и гусениц)
- 2005 — About the Cat that Fell From the Sky (Про кошку, которая упала с неба)
- 2007 — Enchanted Zaporozhets (Заколдованный запорожец)
- 2011 — Sinbad (Синдбад)
- 2013 — Navigator (Навигатор)
