= Last Year's Snow Was Falling =

1983 clay animation film directed by Alexander Tatarsky

- Падал прошлогодний снег
- Directed by: Alexander Tatarsky
- Written by: Sergey Ivanov
- Narrated by: Stanislav Sadalsky
- Cinematography: Iosif Golomb
- Edited by: Lyubov Georgieva
- Music by: Grigory Gladkov
- Production company: Studio Ekran
- Distributed by: Gosteleradio USSR
- Release date: 1983
- Running time: 19 min.
- Country: Soviet Union
- Language: Russian

Last Year's Snow Was Falling (Russian: Падал прошлогодний снег; translit. Padal proshlogodniy sneg) is a 1983 Soviet clay-animated film directed by Alexander Tatarsky (T/O Ekran studio).

The film reached a cult status after its first appearance on Central TV. The aphoristic remarks of the characters, full of absurd humor, turned into colloquial proverbs.

For this work Tatarsky received the Silver Cooker award at the 1983 Varna International Film Festival.

Loosely based on some folk fairy tales.

== Plot ==
The protagonist is a lazy, ignorant but tricky man. He also suffers from dyslalia (speech disorder). He likes beer and always gets into ridiculous situations. Fortunately he has a strict and authoritative wife. The story begins when his wife sends him to bring a New Year tree from the forest. But the forest in the winter is a magic place full of surprising events and transformations. Entangled in the miracles, having lost and found his own image more than once, the man goes back home with empty hands.

The plot includes two interrelated stories – about the man's dreams and about incredible transformations inside the magic cabin on chicken legs. The first story is based on the fairy tale about a greedy man who saw a rabbit in the forest, daydreamed about growing rich on it, and frightened it away with a shout.

The narrator closes the story by saying that the man eventually got the tree, but it was already spring by that time, so he had to bring it back.

== Censorship ==
The absurd style of narration raised censors' suspicions that the film contains encoded messages to foreign intelligence. Tatarsky was also told the main character of his animation was disrespectful to the image of the common Russian man (you have just one character in the film and he is an idiot).

Some phrases that later became colloquial (Who is here, for example, the last in line for the Tsar position? Nobody?! Then I'll be the First!) were defended by Tatarsky and Ivanov with scandals. Despite their attempts the film was sent "for revision". It was cut anew and redubbed.

== Other facts ==
- Sadalsky did not appear in the credits. Shortly before the final cut, the actor was arrested inside the Cosmos Hotel with a foreign citizen. The information against Sadalsky was reported to Gosteleradio director Sergei Lapin who ordered the removal of Sadalsky's name from the credits as a penalty for forbidden relations with foreigners.
