= Very Blue Beard =

- Directed by: Vladimir Samsonov
- Written by: Arkady Arkanov
- Starring: Mikhail Boyarskiy; Oleg Anofriev
- Cinematography: Vladimir Milovanov
- Music by: Gennady Gladkov
- Production company: Studio Ekran
- Release date: 1979
- Running time: 20 minutes
- Country: Soviet Union
- Language: Russian

Very Blue Beard (Russian: Очень синяя борода, Ochen sinjaja boroda) is a 1979 Soviet musical comedy animated film loosely based on the Bluebeard fairy tale by Charles Perrault. Directed by Vladimir Samsonov, screenplay by Arkady Arkanov. Cinematography by Vladimir Milovanov. Original music score by Gennady Gladkov. Lyrics by Yuliy Kim. Released by T/O Ekran.

A detective is investigating the crimes of the medieval duke Bluebeard – is the latter really guilty of murdering his wives?

== Plot summary ==
The protagonist of the film is a nameless detective, who is interested in the Bluebeard's case. He drives to question him, at the same time making a phone call to his wife. His overly jealous wife tries to persuade him to return immediately, as she suspects him of infidelity. But the detective is fascinated with the story of Bluebeard, who suddenly appears in front of him.

Bluebeard says he was sincerely looking for a happy married life. He "lived alone, all alone in the world" and "wandered around the castle, waiting for [his] brides". Bluebeard wished to be "a husband and a father" and to have, like other people, "family, love and duty". However, his first wife, Marianna, was a terrible fashion-monger, who tormented Bluebeard with recent fashion trends. She cut his beard, completely renovated the interior of the castle and didn't pay Bluebeard any attention, calling him old-fashioned. In the end, exasperated Bluebeard trod on the tail of her personal dragon, causing him to breathe fire, and Marianna was burned alive. His blue beard grows again.

The second wife, Lilyanna, was a health worker. She noted that Bluebeard suffered from "total thinness" and that he treated himself with criminal negligence: "You're on the brink of the grave, but I'll take your case." Lilyanna made her husband do gymnastics, yoga, prohibited drinking wine, eating meat, etc. Extremely exhausted Bluebeard endured it due to his love for her. He finally poisoned her with a toxic mushroom Amanita, which, ironically, she took away from him and ate just as he was about to eat it himself, driven to extremes by this kind of life.

The third wife, Vivianna, was very beautiful, sociable and cheery. Unlike the previous wives, she had butterfly wings. At first Bluebeard and his wife feasted happily, surrounded by the friends and neighbours of the duke. Vivianna, singing "love has no boundaries", flew around the castle: "If it is possible to embrace all living creatures, I am ready to embrace them all". One day Bluebeard went hunting and returned only to find Vivianna in bed with one of his own friends. After short mêlée combat Bluebeard was killed by a stab in the back - possibly by Vivianna.

The Detective writes down the story. On the way home he calls his wife to tell her about a successfully completed investigation. His paranoiac wife doesn't believe him and starts a quarrel. She accuses her husband of infidelity and promises to divorce him. The detective spitefully answers "I'll be home in a moment, my dear", and an exceptionally long blue beard grows on his face.

== Voice cast ==
- Mikhail Boyarskiy, as Detective and the Duke Bluebeard
- Oleg Anofriev, as Duke's dog
- Valentina Ignatyeva, as Marianna, the first wife
- M. Smirnova, as Lilyanna, the second wife
- Larisa Dolina, as Vivianna, the third wife
- Aleksandr Belyavskiy as the Narrator
