= Pilot (studio) =

Russian animation studio based in Moscow

- Native name: Пилот
- Type: Private limited
- Founded: 1988; 38 years ago
- Founder: Alexander Tatarsky; Igor Kovalyov; Anatoly Prokhorov
- Products: Animation

Pilot is a Russian animation studio based in Moscow. It was founded in 1988 by Alexander Tatarsky, Igor Kovalyov, Anatoly Prokhorov, and Igor Gelashvili, becoming the first private animation studio in the Soviet Union. They aimed at both auteur and commercial animation.

== History ==
Aleksandr Tatarsky served as the Pilot's artistic director up until his death in 2007. He was replaced by Eduard Nazarov who held the position until 2013. Currently Igor Gelashvili serves as the studio's director. Pilot produced over 130 animated films.

A subdivision called "Pilot-TV", founded in 1997, produced satirical animated series using 3D motion-captured characters, most famous of them being the studio's key mascots: the Pilot Brothers based on Chief and Colleague from the popular Soviet mini-series Investigation Held by Kolobki.

The studio has received over 50 awards at international film festivals. It is best known for animating the popular Cartoon Network series Mike, Lu & Og outside of Russia.

Many directors have worked in the studio, including Konstantin Bronzit, Ivan Maximov, Andrey Sokolov.

From 2004 on the studio has been working on Mountain of Gems, its biggest project to date. By this day over seventy 13-minute cartoons were produced with the support of the State Committee for Cinematography. They are based on fairy tales of Russian people and other ethnic groups that populate the Russian Federation and former Soviet states. Each short features distinctive art direction and animation technique, including claymation, stop motion, traditional and computer animation. The project won a number of awards.

During the Great Recession, the studio almost shut down due to the lack of money. The four final films of the Mountain of Gems series were supposed to be finished in July 2010, with Goskino paying for them in February or April; however, the money was never received. Studio producer Lev Bubnikov has said that suing Goskino to make them uphold the contract would have been "pointless". Yet in 2012 the studio received further financing and the project was revived. In 2014 an official YouTube channel for Mountain of Gems and its spin-off project Animated Russia was launched where the episodes are uploaded in Russian, English, Spanish and Chinese languages.

== See also ==
- History of Russian animation
