= Russia Beyond =

Russian state media outlet

- Russia Beyond The Headlines insert in 20 November 2015 international edition of The New York Times
- Type: Multilingual state media
- Owner: ANO TV-Novosti
- Editor-in-chief: Vsevolod Pulya
- Founded: 2007; 19 years ago
- Language: English, Spanish, Portuguese, French, German, Indonesian, Japanese, Italian, Bulgarian, Macedonian, Serbian, Croatian, Slovene, Russian
- Headquarters: 25 bld.1 Pyatnitskaya Street; Moscow, Russia
- Website: www.gw2ru.com (new) www.rbth.com (old)

Logo after the rebranding to Gateway to Russia

Russia Beyond (formerly Russia Beyond The Headlines), rebranded as Gateway to Russia in December 2024, is a Russian multilingual project operated by RT (formerly Russia Today) parent ANO TV-Novosti, founded by the Russian state media agency RIA Novosti.

== History ==
Russia Beyond The Headlines (RBTH) was launched in 2007 by the Rossiyskaya Gazeta, a newspaper published by the government of Russia. The first publisher of the project was the deputy CEO of Rossiyskaya Gazeta Eugene Abov.

On 9 January 2016, RBTH became part of TV-Novosti whilst retaining its own distinct brand. In 2017, the project dropped all printed versions.

On 5 September 2017, RBTH dropped the last two words of its full name, becoming Russia Beyond. The look and feel of the English edition was also refreshed substantially, removing all things regarded as distracting on screen when reading a story or watching a video.

After using a stylized R as the logo for nine years, Russia Beyond introduced a brand new one on 20 February 2023.

== Reception ==
In 2007 and 2014, former Slate journalist Jack Shafer and The Guardian commentator Roy Greenslade respectively accused Russia Beyond of being propaganda. In Europe, the media outlet paid London's Daily Telegraph, Le Figaro in France, Süddeutsche Zeitung in Germany, and the Italian daily La Repubblica to be distributed as an insert to those publications, and in the United States it partnered with The Washington Post until 2015; The Wall Street Journal and The New York Times were bundling the insert into their regular editions as of 2018. Beyond the Headlines paid the Daily Telegraph £40,000 per month to be distributed as a supplement to its weekend publication and the Daily Telegraph website also featured content from RBTH's website. The monthly Russia-themed supplement first appeared in The Daily Telegraph and the American Washington Post in 2007 under the name Russia Now.

== See also ==
- Media of Russia
