= Vampires of Geon =

- Directed by: Gennady Tischchenko
- Written by: Gennady Tischenko
- Starring: Rogvold Sukhoverko; Aleksandr Luschik; Vsevolod Abdulov
- Music by: Senya Son
- Production companies: TPO «Soyuztelefil'm» Studiya mul'tiplikatsionnykh telefil'mov
- Release dates: 1991 (Part 1); 1992 (Part 2)
- Running time: 9 min + 10 min
- Country: USSR

Vampires of Geon (Russian: Вампиры Геоны, romanized: Vampiry Geony) and Masters of Geon (Russian: Хозяева Геоны, romanized: Khozyaeva Geony) is a two-part Soviet and Russian animated film from 1991 to 1992 based on the story of Gennady Tishchenko "The Vampire of Gaynomius" (1977).

The cartoon shows the difficulty of mastering other people's planets and the complexity of contact with the inhabitants of the planet. It is the first part of the unfinished space opera animated saga under the working title Star World and was followed by Masters of Geon and AMBA.

As a soundtrack, the instrumental composition "Magic" from the album "Dama Pik" (1989) of Moscow's Hard Rock group "Joker" was used.

== Plot ==
The Cosmosecological Commission (KEK) urgently sends inspector Yanina to the distant planet of Geon to understand why vampires, native inhabitants of Geon attack the research expedition of the Concern Galax, and how to stop them. The development of mineral minerals Geones are promising from a commercial point of view, and the air is suitable for breathing earthlings, in connection with which the Concern is going to colonize the planet.

On the planet, Yanin becomes a victim of vampires, but his American colleagues (bearing obvious similarity to Schwarzenegger and Stallone) help him. They propose to play a plan developed by them - to lure vampires with a signal and shoot them. Yanin gives the right to conduct an experiment on the minimum signal power, together the cosmonauts fight vampires, but later Yanin decides to look for another way and goes to the reconnaissance. On the way, vampires attack him again, but he manages to recover from the disease they carry because of prolonged exposure to air. He meets representatives of a rational race, and they explain to him that vampires produce food for them and are an important part of the ecosystem.

Yanin realizes the unacceptability of further interference and stops the experiment, people close the base.
