= Lev Shimelov =

Soviet and Russian actor and director (1930–2026)

- Лев Шимелов
- Born: 28 January 1930
- Died: 24 April 2026 (aged 96)
- Occupations: Actor, director

Lev Pavlovich Shimelov (Russian: Лев Павлович Шимелов; 28 January 1930 – 24 April 2026) was a Soviet and Russian director and actor, who was an Honored Artist of the RSFSR. He was also a jazz entertainer in Azerbaijan SSR in 1952. Shimelov died on April 24, 2026, at the age of 96.
