= Bruce & Bongo =

British pop duo

Bruce & Bongo was a 1980s Germany-based British pop duo best known in Europe for the hit single "Geil". The duo consisted of musician/singer Bruce Hammond Earlam and musician/singer Douglas "Bongo" Wilgrove, both from England.

"Geil" spent four weeks at No. 1 in Germany in 1986. It also became a hit in Austria, Italy, Belgium, Switzerland and the Netherlands. The song was released alongside their sole album, The Geil Album. In the context of the song, the German word "geil" is used to mean "cool" or "awesome", but it also means "horny". The duo also promoted a second single, "Hi Ho (Whistle While You Work)", at several events in Germany.

In 1994, Hammond helped establish a new production company, "How's That" Music, which assisted in the creation of several European hits, including the Mark'Oh project. Hammond has also worked on the albums Beyond the Banana Islands and Magic Tour.

== Discography ==
=== Albums ===
| Title | Album details |
|---|---|
| The Geil Album | Released: 1986; Label: Rush; Formats: CD, cassette, LP |

=== Singles ===
| Title | Year | Peak chart positions | | | | | | | Album |
| Title | Year | GER | AUT | BEL (FLA) | ITA | NDL | SPA | SWI | Album |
|---|---|---|---|---|---|---|---|---|---|
| "French Foreign Legion" | 1986 | – | – | – | – | – | – | – | The Geil Album |
| "Geil" | 1986 | 1 | 1 | 16 | 4 | 15 | – | 7 | The Geil Album |
| "Hi Ho (Heigh Ho – Whistle While You Work)" | 1986 | 29 | – | – | – | – | – | – | The Geil Album |
| "The Best Disco (In the World)" | 1987 | – | – | – | – | – | 46 | – | Non-album singles |
| "Holidays Are Here Again" (with Klaus & Klaus) | 1987 | – | — | — | — | — | – | – | Non-album singles |
| "We Ain't Back" | 1992 | – | — | — | — | — | — | — | Non-album singles |
"—" denotes items which were not released in that country or failed to chart.
