= Studio Ekran =

Soviet animation studio

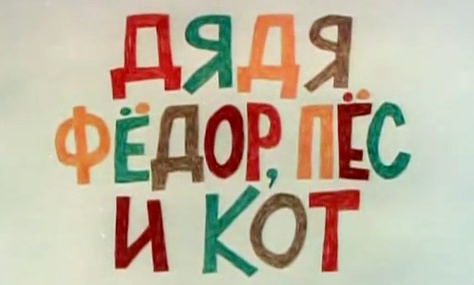
Film title screen of Uncle Fedya, His Dog, and His Cat by Studio Ekran.

Studio Ekran (Russian: Творческое объединение «Экран», or simply, “творческое «ЭКРАН» объединение, Artistical Joint "Ekran") was a Russian (Soviet Union's until 1991) TV film studio. It was founded in 1968 and produced made-for-TV movies, mini-series, animated cartoons and live action. In 2008, it was liquidated after the reorganization of Ostankino TV channel.

Pavel Muntyan's Toonbox was established from Studio Ekran.

== History ==
It was established on 17 June 1967 (before that, the production and ordering of television films for the USSR State Television and Radio Broadcasting Company was carried out by the USSR State Television and Radio Broadcasting Company itself, represented by the Film Production Department of the Soviet Central Television, created on 24 February 1964). Since 1970, the association began to produce animated television films and to act as a representative of the USSR State Television and Radio Broadcasting Company when placing orders for the production of television films by film studios and one of their producers: on average, out of 117 feature television films annually, 15 were produced by the association itself and 102 film studios by its order, 40% of films produced in the country were shot by order of the association. For example, at the Georgia-Film film studio, 6 out of 14 full-length feature films shot annually were ordered by the association.

At the same time, part of the television and cinematography activities continued to be carried out by the USSR State Television and Radio Broadcasting Committee itself: it dubbed foreign television films through the Main Editorial Board of Film Programs of the Soviet Central Television, and ordered television films from local television studios through the Department of Television Films of the Main Directorate of Local Radio Broadcasting and Television.

=== TPO Soyuztelefilm (1988-2008) ===
On 15 October 1988, the creative association Ekran was transformed into the creative and production association Soyuztelefilm (TPO Soyuztelefilm), which took over some of the functions of thematic main editorial boards (including the purchase and dubbing of foreign-language television films and television series, ordering the production of television films from local television organizations), which became the main customer and one of the producers of television films for the USSR State Television and Radio Broadcasting Committee.

In the spring of 1992, the association almost completely ceased ordering and producing television films, and its main activity became providing already shot films to various television organizations. On 7 May 1992, it was transferred to the jurisdiction of the Ostankino State Television and Radio Broadcasting Company, on 7 September 1993, it was removed from its subordination, on 15 May 1997, it received the status of a state unitary enterprise, since 1998 - a subsidiary of VGTRK, in 2006 it was liquidated (on its basis, a branch of the same name was created in the VGTRK structure, on 28 July 2008, VGTRK renounced the rights to the films of TO Ekran / TPO Soyuztelefilm in favor of the State Television and Radio Broadcasting Fund, and on 10 September 2008, the branch was liquidated). Creative Association "Ekran" of the Russian State Television and Radio Broadcasting Company "Ostankino" (1992-1996) On 13 March 1992, the Russian State Television and Radio Broadcasting Company "Ostankino" (created on the basis of the USSR State Television and Radio Broadcasting Company) established a subsidiary organization, the Creative Association "Ekran", which produced several television films, as well as the telenovela "Petersburg Secrets". The purchase and dubbing of foreign television films and television series, the purchase of domestic and foreign films for the television and radio company was carried out by another subsidiary organization, the Film Program Studio of the Russian State Television and Radio Broadcasting Company "Ostankino"[1], the purchase and dubbing of foreign children's and youth television films and television series, the purchase of children's and youth films - the Studio of Children's and Youth Programs of the Russian State Television and Radio Broadcasting Company "Ostankino".

However, some time after the liquidation of the Ostankino State Television and Radio Broadcasting Company on 12 October 1995, the activities of the creative association came to a standstill, and the rights to its films (as well as other films and programs of other subsidiaries of the television and radio company) were transferred to the State Television and Radio Broadcasting Fund on 17 July 1997.

== Filmography ==
=== Popular films ===
- Hello, I'm Your Aunt! / «Здравствуйте, я ваша тётя!» (1975)
- People and Mannequins / «Люди и манекены» (1974)
- The Twelve Chairs / «12 стульев» (1976)
- Little Tragedies / «Маленькие трагедии» (1979)
- All Costs Paid / «За всё заплачено» (1988)

=== Popular animation works ===
- Leopold the Cat / «Кот Леопольд» (1974–1987)
- A Girl and a Dolphin / «Девочка и дельфин» (1979)
- Very Blue Beard / «Очень синяя борода» (1979)
- The Wizard of the Emerald City / «Волшебник Изумрудного города» (1974–1975)
- The Adventures of Dunno and his friends / «Приключения Незнайки и его друзей» (1971—1973)
- Dunno in the Sunny City / «Незнайка в Солнечном городе» (1976—1977)
- Lost and Found / «Бюро находок» (1982—1984)
- Last Year's Snow Was Falling / «Падал прошлогодний снег» (1983)
- Patchwork and Cloud / «Лоскутик и облако» (1977)
- Mom for a Mammoth Baby / «Мама для мамонтёнка» (1981)
- Plasticine Crow / «Пластилиновая ворона» (1981)
- Investigation held by Kolobki / «Следствие ведут Колобки» (1986)
- Big Ear / «Большой Ух» (1989)
- KOAPP / «КОАПП» (1984-1990)
- Vampires of Geon / «Вампиры Геоны» (1991–1992)
- Captain Pronin / «Капитан Пронин» (1992–1994)
- AMBA / «АМБА» (1994–1995)
- The Adventures of Funtik the Piglet / «Приключения поросёнка Фунтика» (1986—1988)
- Gena the Crocodile / «Крокодил Гена»

== See also ==
- History of Russian animation
