= David Cherkassky =

Soviet and Ukrainian animation director, screenwriter, animator (1931–2018)

- Давид Янович Черкаський
- Born: 23 August 1931; Shpola, Ukrainian SSR, Soviet Union
- Died: 30 October 2018 (aged 87); Kyiv, Ukraine
- Education: Kyiv National University of Construction and Architecture
- Occupations: Animation director, screenwriter
- Known for: Adventures of Captain Wrongel; Treasure Island
- Spouse: Natalya Marchenkova
- Awards: People's Artist of Ukraine (2010); Order of Merit (II and III class)

David Yanovich Cherkassky (Russian: Давид Янович Черкасский; Ukrainian: Давид Янович Черкаський, romanized: Davyd Yanovych Cherkaskyi; 23 August 1931 – 30 October 2018) was a Soviet and Ukrainian animated film director and screenwriter. His work in the Kievnauchfilm studio include The Adventures of Captain Wrongel, Doctor Aybolit, and Treasure Island.

== Biography ==
David Cherkassky was born in 1931 into a Jewish household in Shpola, Ukrainian SSR. Cherkassky graduated from the Kiev Construction Engineering Institute. He noted that Soviet parents anticipated that the Soviet Union will participate in war and so registered their children later to delay them to be drafted to army. Cherkassky in interview acknowledged, that he was born on 23 August 1932. During World War II, he and his mother were evacuated to a village near the Russian city of Chkalov (today Orenburg).

David Cherkassky was a member of the Ukrainian gymnast team. From his 50s into his 80s, Cherkassky enjoyed alpine skiing.

After the death of Stalin, Cherkassky found out that his family origin is a small city of Shpola in Central Ukraine and he has some extensive family in the United States. His father was a director of typography after the revolution and later he served as an assistant to People's Commissar of Justice.

Cherkassky was an academician of the Academy of Television (1997), a corresponding member of the National Academy of Arts of Ukraine (1998), and a member of the National Unions of Cinematographers and Journalists of Ukraine. He was awarded the titles of Merited Artist of Ukraine in 1995, People's Artist of Ukraine in 2010, and Order of Merit (second class) in 2002 and 2007.

He was married to animator and animation director Natalya Marchenkova.

Following his death on 30 October 2018, David Cherkassky was buried in the Berkovets Cemetery in Kyiv.

== Filmography ==
=== Director ===
- 1964 Mystery of the Black King (Russian: Тайна чёрного короля) along with Sergei Lyalin
- 1967 Columbus is landing on the coast (Russian: Колумб причаливает к берегу)
- 1969 Mystery-Bouffe (Russian: Мистерия-буфф)
- 1970 Short stories (Russian: Короткие истории)
- 1971 Wizard Okh (Russian: Волшебник Ох)
- 1972 Around the World against the Will (Russian: Вокруг света поневоле)
- 1974 Pharaohs, good-bye! (Russian: Прощайте, фараоны!) along with Vyacheslav Vinnik
- 1975 What the hell do you want? (Russian: Какого рожна хочется?)
- 1979 Adventures of Captain Wrongel (Russian: Приключения капитана Врунгеля)
- 1983 Wings (Russian: Крылья)
- 1984 Doctor Aybolit (Russian: Доктор Айболит)
- 1988 Treasure Island (Russian: Остров сокровищ)
- 1992 Crazy macaroni or the error of professor Bugensberg (Russian: Макароны смерти, или Ошибка профессора Буггенсберга), the motion picture was not finished
