= Adventures of Captain Wrongel =

- Captain Wrongel, Fuchs and Lom onboard (Po)beda
- Directed by: David Cherkassky
- Written by: Andrey Nekrasov (original novel) and I. Vorobyov (Yefim Chepovetsky, screenplay)
- Starring: Zinovy Gerdt; Yevhen Papernyi; Heorhiy Kyshko
- Music by: Georgy Firtich
- Distributed by: Kievnauchfilm
- Release dates: 1976 (episodes 1–3); 1977 (episodes 4–6); 1978 (episodes 7–9); 1979 (episodes 10–13)
- Running time: 10 minutes (each episode); 128 minutes total
- Country: Soviet Union
- Language: Russian

Adventures of Captain Wrongel (Russian: «Приключения капитана Врунгеля», romanized: Priklyucheniya kapitana Vrungelya) is a 1976–1979 Soviet cutout/traditional animation adventure miniseries by David Cherkassky, Kievnauchfilm, loosely based on the novel with the same name by Andrey Nekrasov. The series consists of 13 episodes, of which 1–3 were animated/filmed in 1976, 4–6 in 1977, 7–9 in 1978, and 10–13 in 1979.

The book by Nekrasov was first published in the Pioneer magazine in 1937 (shortened, in the form of a comic). A full text publication was issued in 1939. The novel is a parody of the popular sailor tales of the 1930s and of stereotypes, then prevalent in the Soviet Union, of foreigners and foreign countries. The film received awards at Yerevan all-union film festival and the Czechoslovakia international TV film festival. The songs and music were performed by the soloists' ensemble of the State Symphony Orchestra of the UkSSR, conducted by N. Basov.

== Plot ==
An important exhibit is stolen from the Royal Museum of Arts. The watchman Fuchs, a gambler, has been blackmailed by a mafia boss, who is also Chief of a Yacht Club, to steal the statue of Venus. The time of the theft was linked to an international regatta so that Fuchs could smuggle the stolen goods out of the country.

A Soviet naval school teacher and former sea captain, Wrongel, receives a telegram asking him to participate in the regatta. He and his apprentice Lom (Лом - rus. "Crowbar") decide to set sail for the starting port. During a bizarre accident, the first two letters of their ship's name fall off, which changes their ship's name from "POBEDA" (ПОБЕДА - rus. "Victory") to "BEDA" (БЕДА - rus. "Trouble"). Throughout almost the entire journey, Wrongel and Lom have no idea about the hidden purpose of the regatta. At that point in time, everything is going smoothly and according to plan for Fuchs. Many newspapers of the world have written extensively about this "crime of the century". The regatta is in danger of cancellation.

When Wrongel's yacht Beda arrives, they find out that three crew members are needed to participate in the regatta. Lom quickly finds Fuchs, who is desperate in his attempts to get to the Black Cuttlefish yacht as arranged with the mafia chief. As a result, the much sought after statue of Venus ends up on the Beda, instead of the Black Cuttlefish, which was supposed to smuggle it out of the port.

Meanwhile, Agent 00X is chasing the statue, as well as the mafiosi Banditto and Gangsteritto, hired by the mafia chief, who are looking for Fuchs in order to take it away from him.

== Cast ==
- Zinovy Gerdt as Captain Christopher Bonifatievich Wrongel
- Yevhen Papernyi as Lom / Archibald Dandy, Chief / Zoo Director / Mail Ship Sailor / Reporter 1 / Yacht Club Member 2
- Heorhiy Kyshko as Sailor Fuchs / Customs Officer / Mailman / Reporter 2 / Market Gambler 1 / Plane Passenger 1
- Grigory Shpigel as Agent 00X (singing voice by Georgy Kislyuk)
- Semyon Farada as Giulico Banditto / Reporter 4
- Aleksandr Burmistrov as De La Voro Gangsteritto / Hawaiian Performer / Beach Director / Yacht Club Member 1 / Market Gambler 2 / Plane Passenger 2
- Eduard Nazarov as Captain of "Black Cuttlefish"
- Veniamin Smekhov as Admiral / Radio Announcer / Reporter 3

== See also ==
- The New Adventures of Captain Wrongel (1978)

== Sources ==
- New Adventures of Captain Vrungel/Novye priklyucheniya kapitana Vrungelya (1978) - IMDb entry
