= Russian North =

Northern regions of the European part of Russia

Map of the Northern Economic Region of Russia

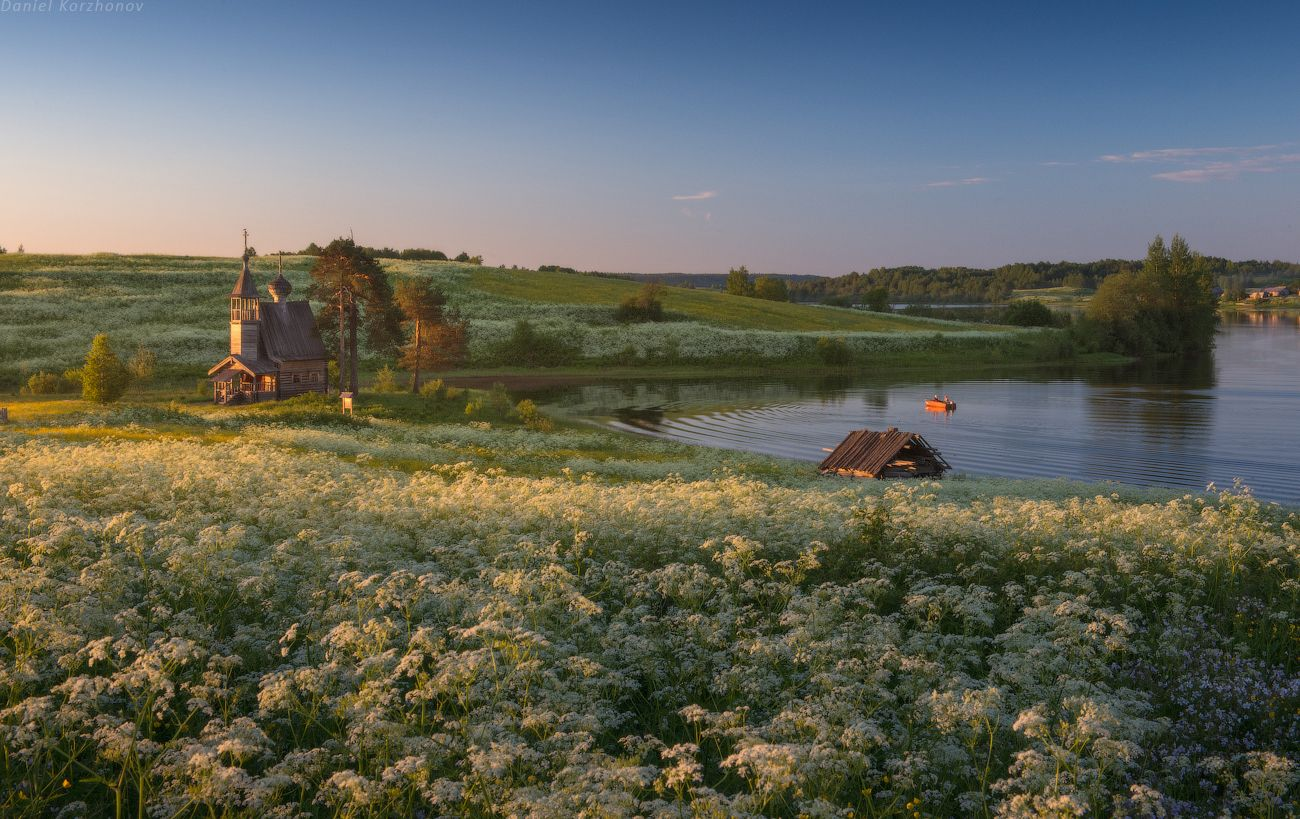
The Kenozero National Park is a cultural landscape recognized as a World Heritage Site

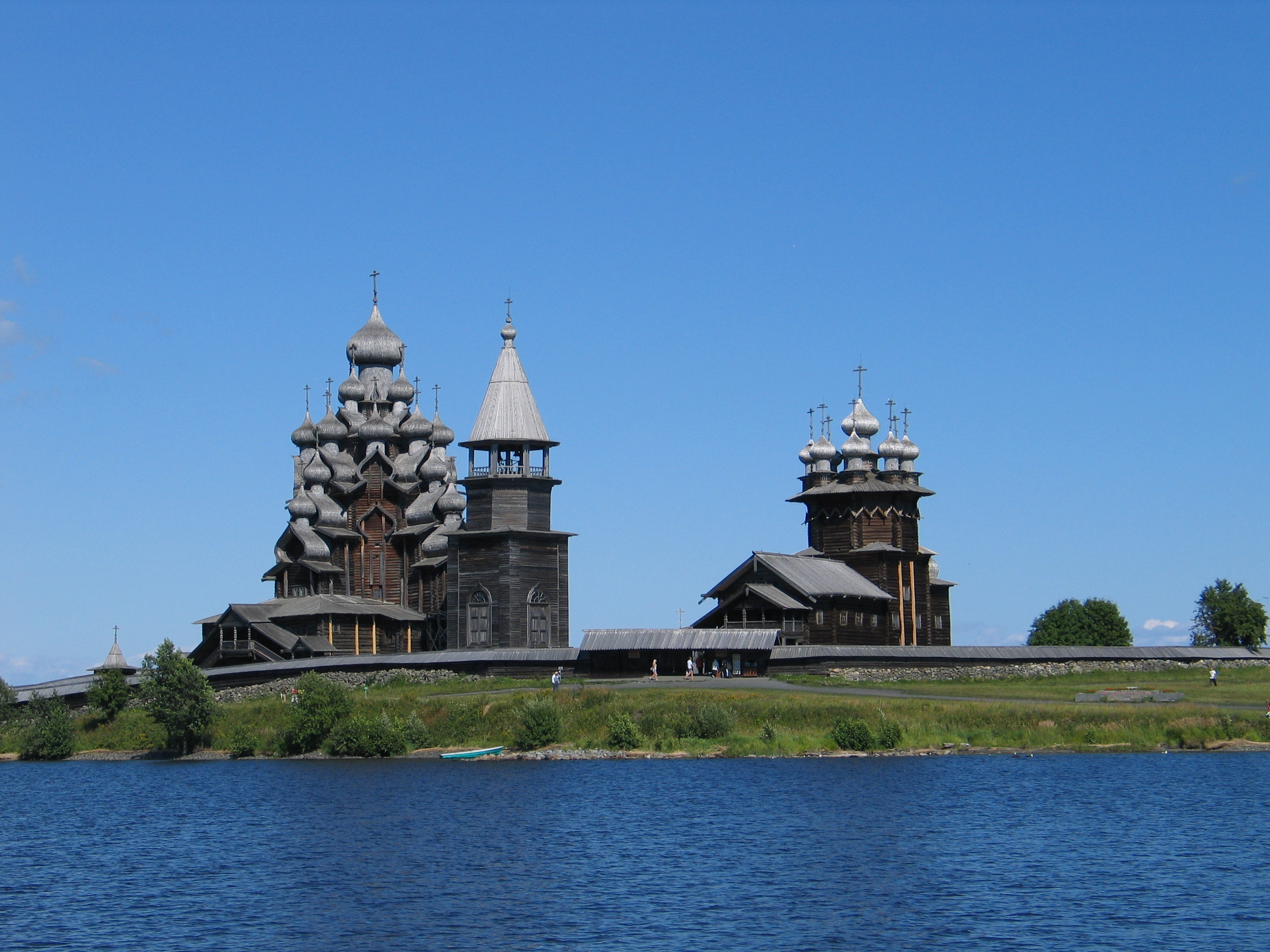
Kizhi Pogost

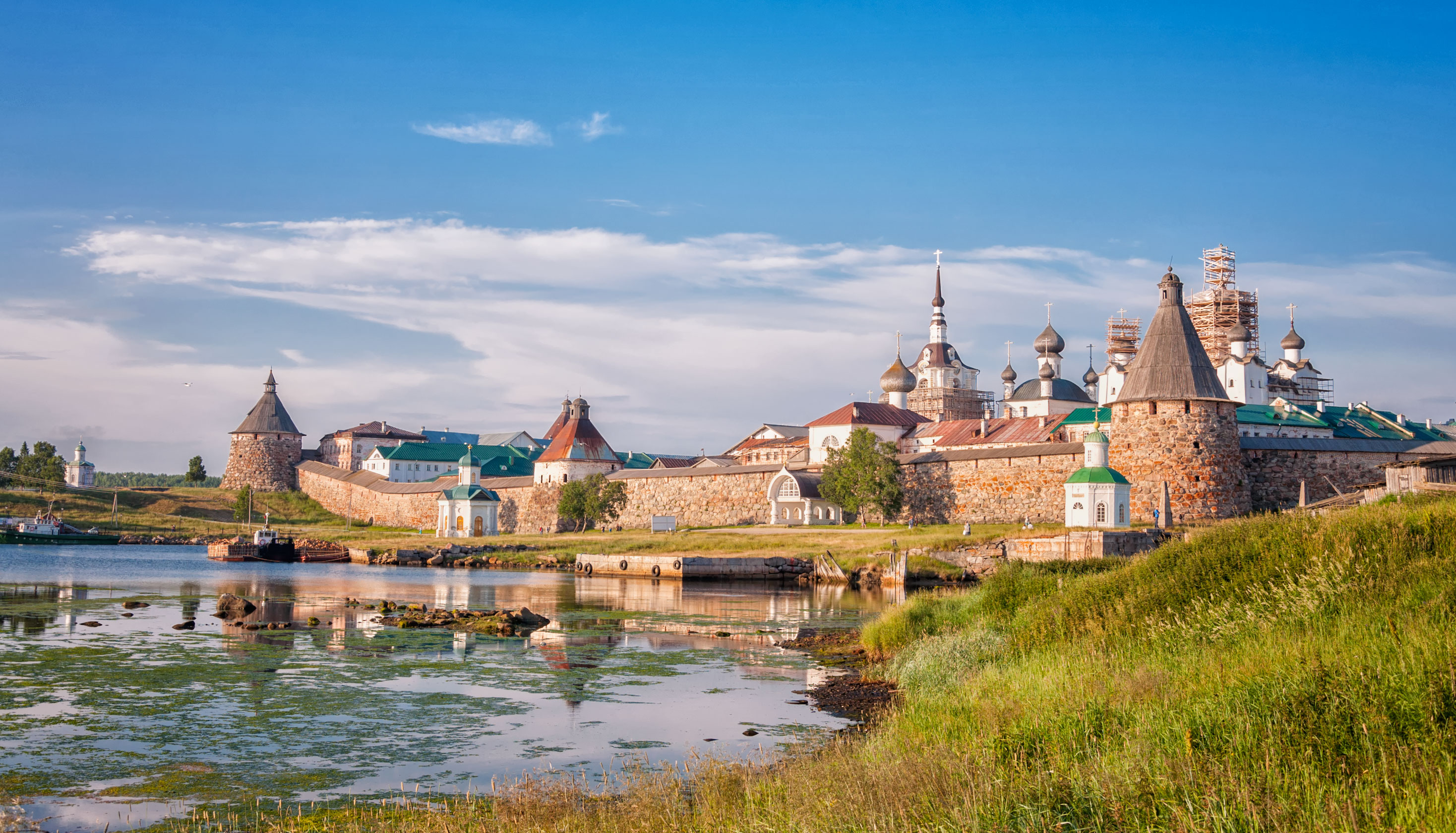
Solovetsky Monastery

The Russian North (Russian: Русский Север, Russky Sever) is a historical and cultural region situated in the northwestern part of Russia, north of Vologda. It spans the regions of Arkhangelsk Oblast (including Nenets Autonomous Okrug) and Murmansk Oblast. It also includes parts of the Vologda Oblast, Komi Republic, and Republic of Karelia. The concept of the Russian North is not universal and may include other regions.

The region is known for its traditions of folk art – in particular, Russian wooden architecture, wood and bone carving and painting. Due to its remoteness, the rural parts of Russian North preserved much of the archaic aspects of Russian culture during the 19th and 20th centuries, making it of particular interest to historians, culturologists and ethnographers.

The Russian North is also noted for its combination of Slavic and Finnic cultural traits. The Pomor dialects are still spoken in some parts of this region. It is likely that the region appeared in Norse sagas as Bjarmaland.

== History ==
Around 2900 BC to 2050 BC, the Indo-European Corded Ware (Fatyanovo culture) group moved into the northern Russian forests, replacing local hunter-gatherer population. The Fatyanovo people predominantly carried the R1a genetic marker. They first introduced advanced metallurgy, animal herding and farming. The arrival of the Finno-Ugric languages is linked to the Seima-Turbino culture in Europe and occurred in waves, spanning from roughly 2100 BC to 1700 BC.

In the Early Middle Ages, the area seems to have been settled by a Finno-Ugric population (possibly speaking the extinct Bjarmian languages). The initial Russian colonization of the Russian North was launched independently from Novgorod and Rostov in the 11th and 12th centuries (at the latest).

Genetic studies show that some populations of Russian North still have a significant Finnic admixture, which is not typical for more southern Russian populations. The pre-Russian populations of the region were recorded as "Beyond-the-Volga Chudes" in chronicles. Russian North is rich in toponyms and hydronyms of possibly Finno-Ugric substrate origin, which were extensively studied by many linguists, most notably A. K. Matveyev.

By the 13th century, most of the area was incorporated into the Novgorod Republic which, in its turn, was incorporated into Grand Duchy of Moscow in the 1470s. The climate of the Russian North is harsh, with minimum possibilities for agriculture, therefore fishing, hunting for marine mammals, as well as the salt-cooking industry, became alternatives for the people living in the area. Most of the Russian North territories never had serfdom, at least the way it existed in central Russian agricultural regions.

By the late 16th century the White Sea port of Arkhangelsk became the major gateway for the Russian commerce with Europe. On the other hand, the Stroganov merchant family from the salt-mining town of Solvychegodsk started expanding eastwards, to the Principality of Perm and eventually into Siberia. This explains why Siberia was explored and originally settled by the Russians from the Northern areas.

Since the Russian North seemed the perfect place for a religious escape from the world, Orthodox monasteries, with their ambitions and possibilities (through religion and economic power), were critical for the Russian North economy. Northern Thebaid is the poetic name of the northern Russian lands surrounding Vologda and Belozersk (now comprising the Russian North National Park). It alludes to Thebaid, a part of Egypt which was home to early Christian monks and hermits. The Kirillov Monastery was, by area, Europe's largest monastery.

In the mid-19th century, Sergey V. Maksimov first drew readers’ attention to the distinctive world of the Russian North with his 1859 book A Year in the North, which was reprinted many times. In the Soviet period, writers such as Mikhail Prishvin, Boris Shergin, Stepan Pisakhov, Yury Kazakov, Fyodor Abramov, and Yury Koval continued to explore and celebrate the life and spirit of the Russian North in their works.

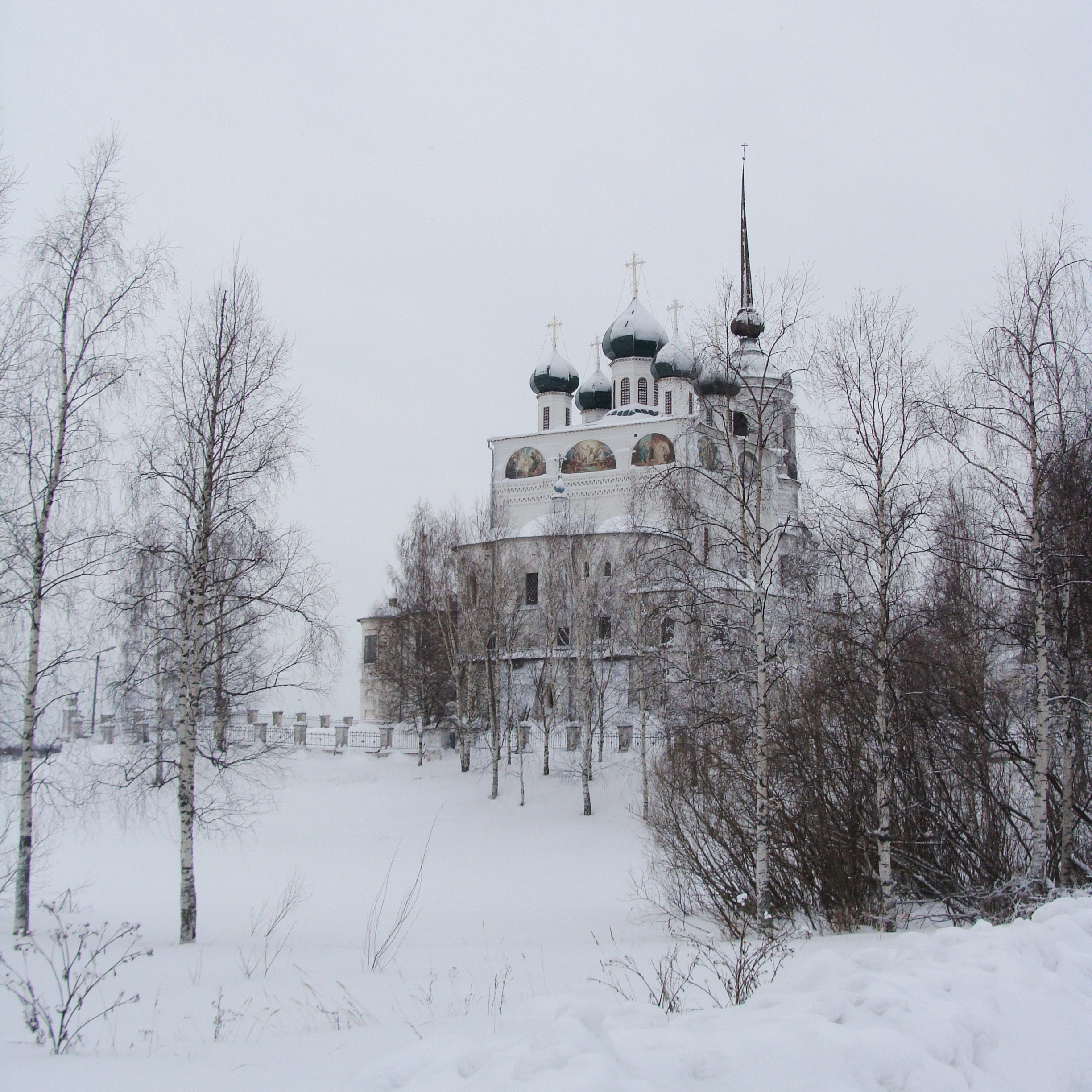
Church of the Annunciation (Solvychegodsk, built in 1586)

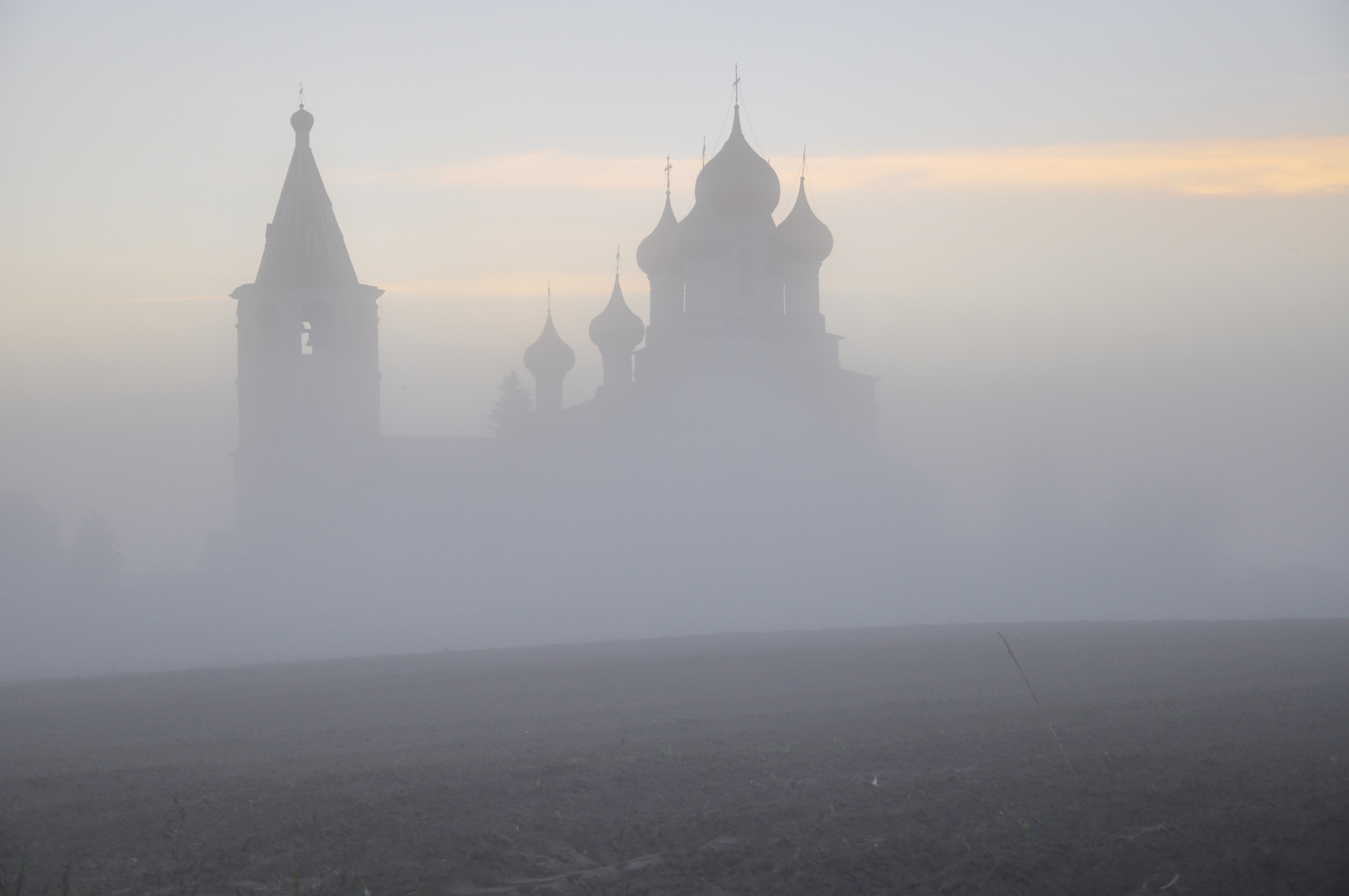
A church near Arkhangelsk (built 1686-1694)

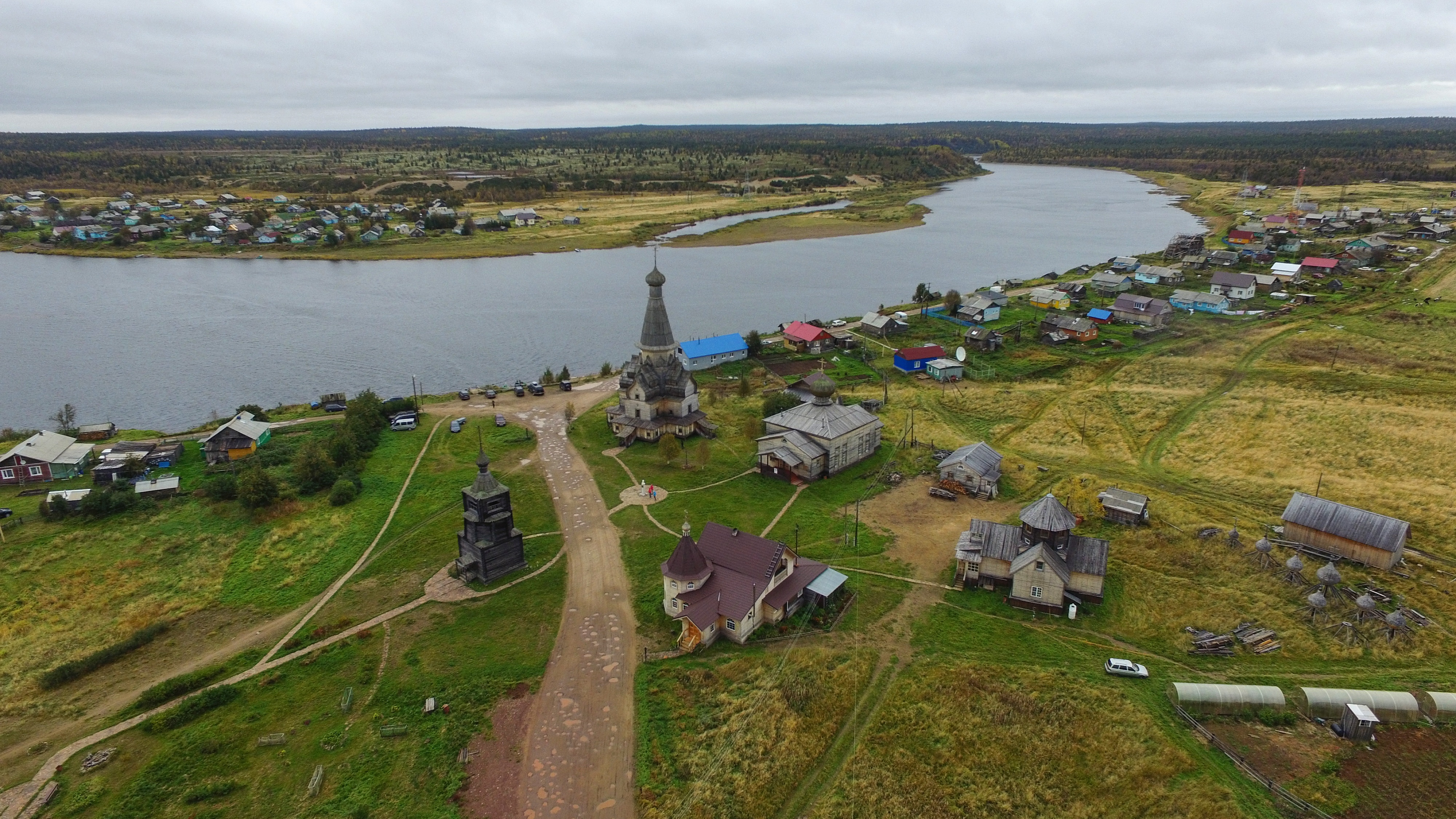
The village of Varzuga on the Tersky Coast of the Kola Peninsula

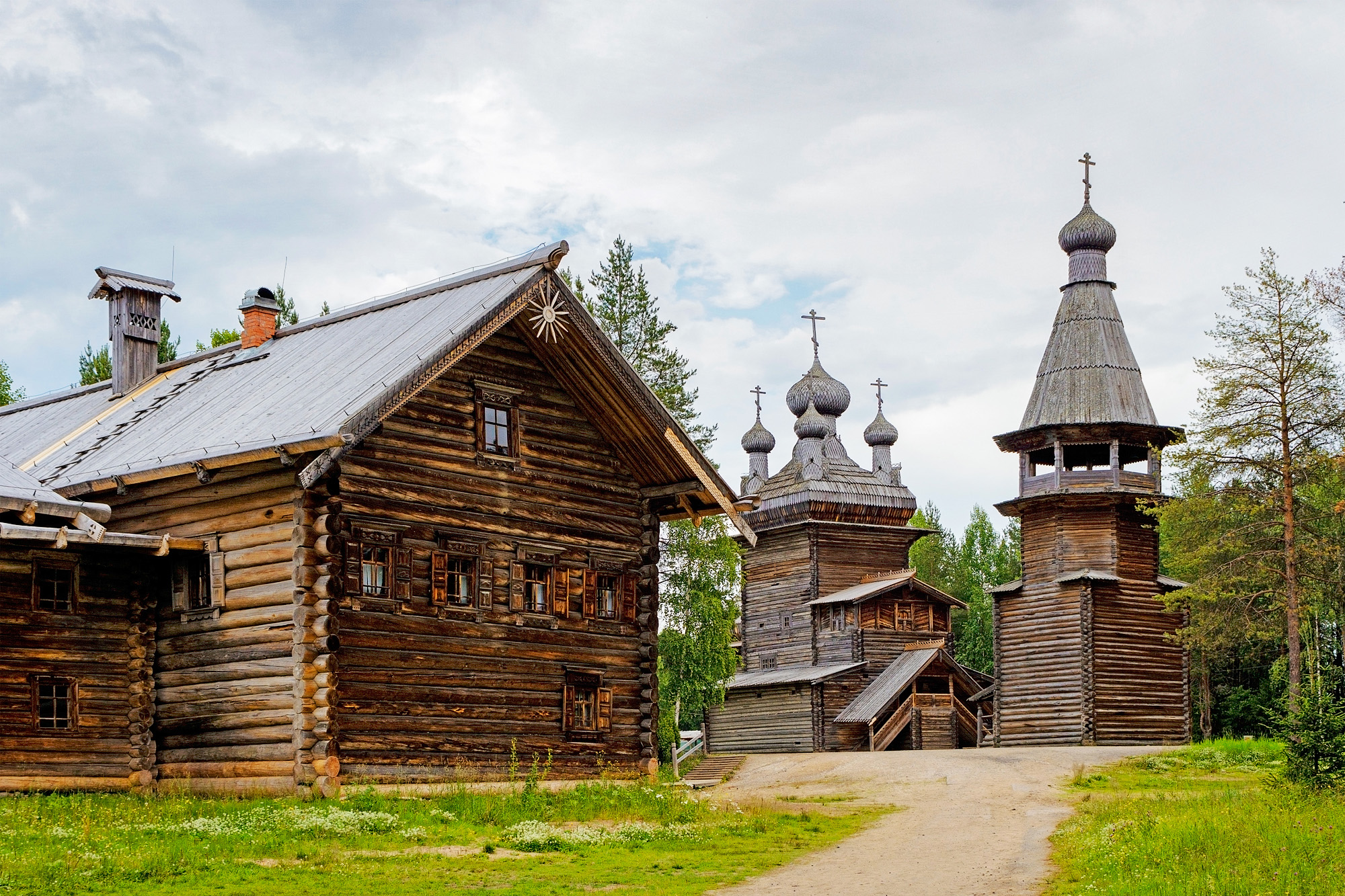
An open-air wooden architecture museum in Malye Korely

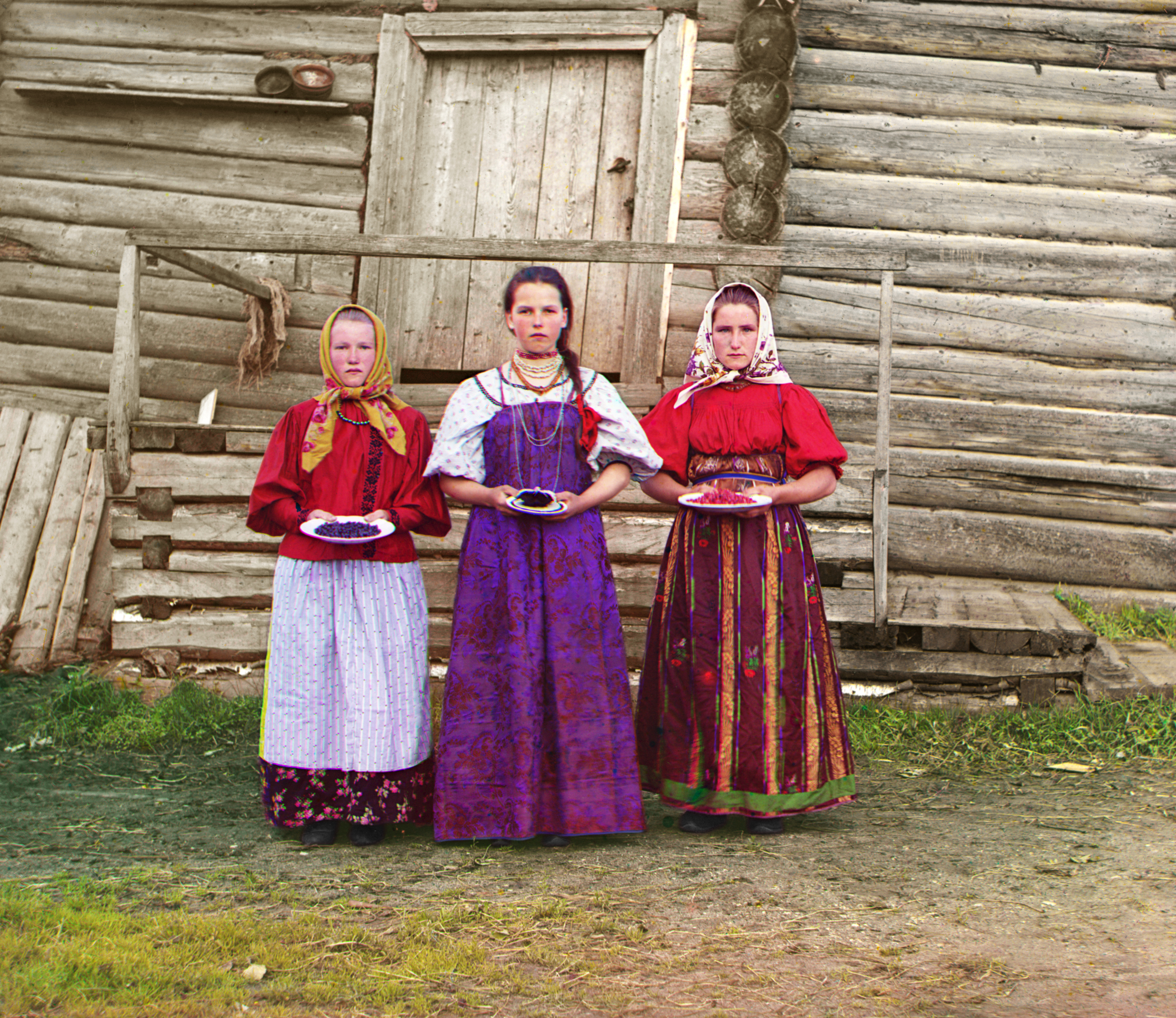
Young peasant women in Vologda Governorate, early 20th century

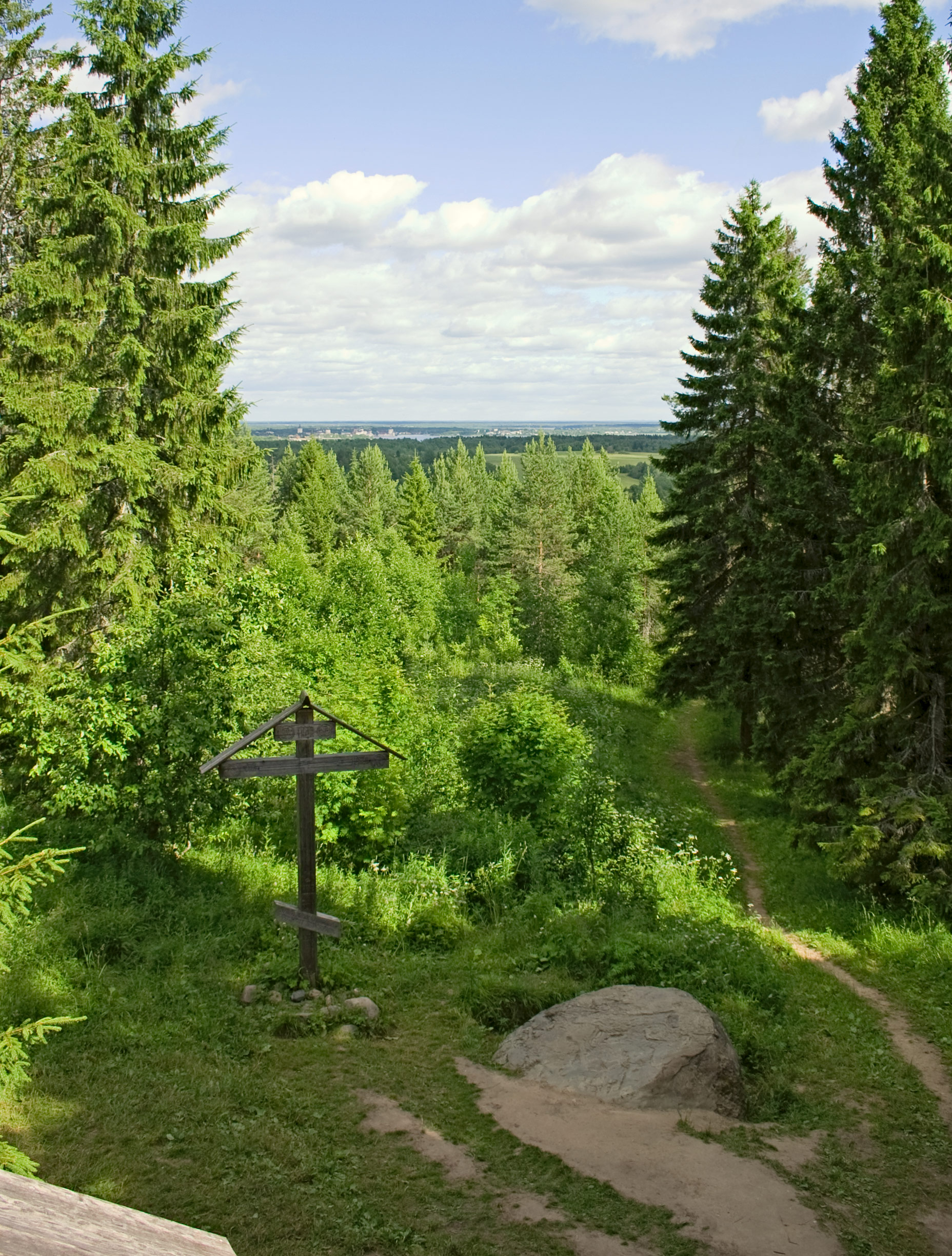
Nature in the national park near the Kirillo-Belozersky Monastery

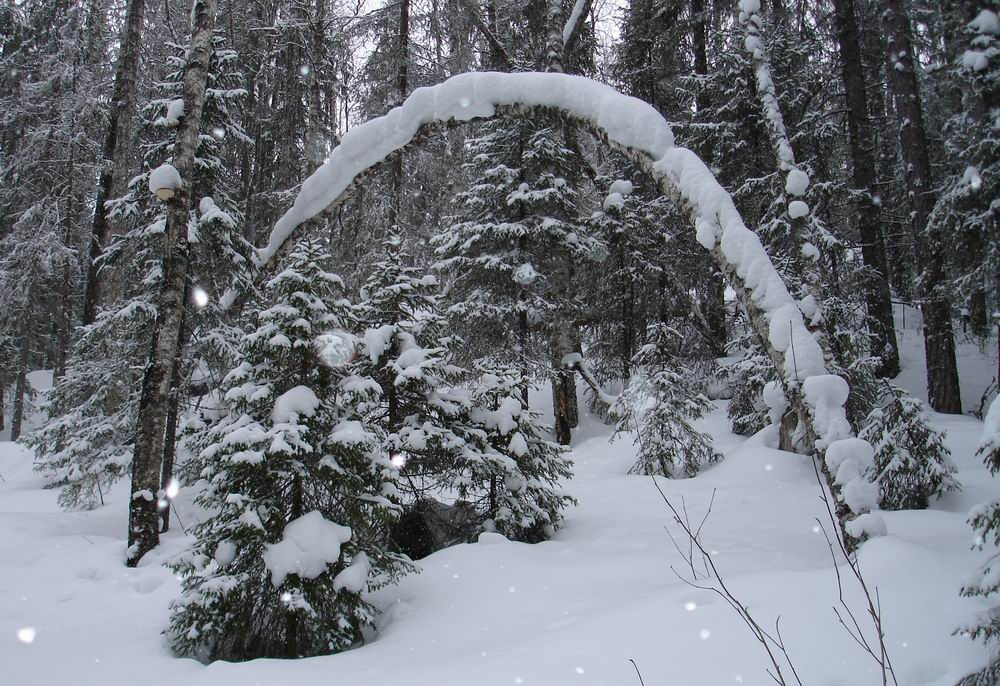
A taiga forest near Pinega

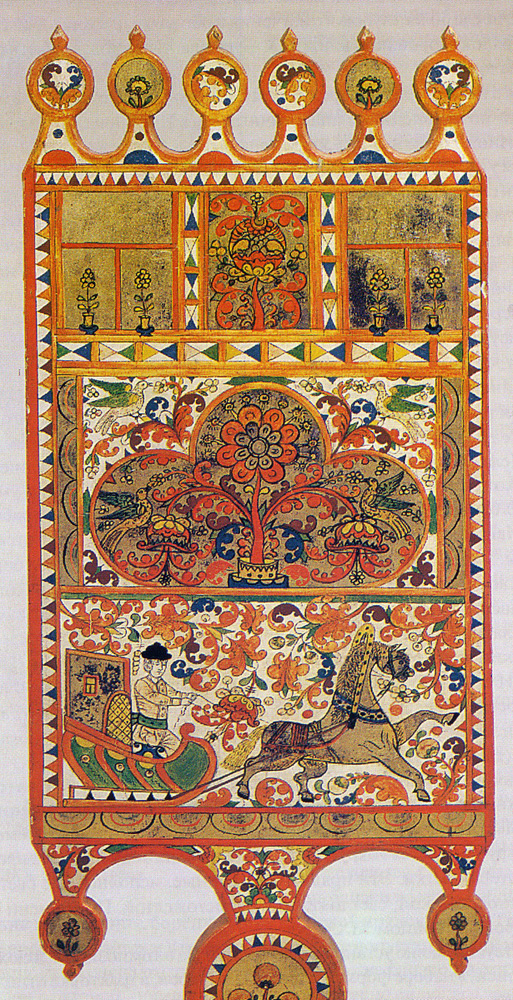
Spinning wheel board from Arkhangelsk Oblast (19th century)

== Demographics ==
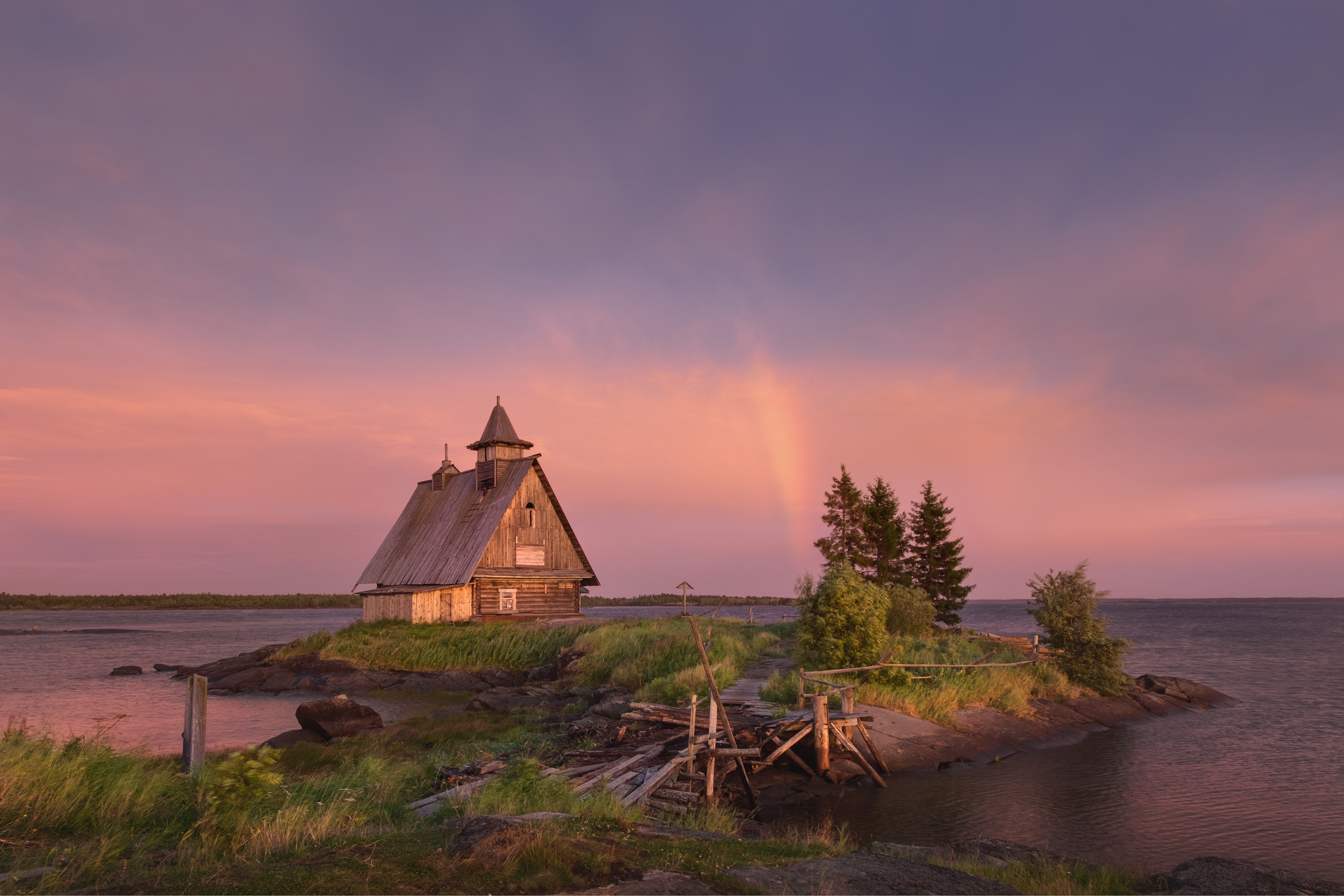
A chapel built for shooting a feature film

The White Sea coastal part of the Russian North is home to Pomors, a unique subethnic group of Russians with a maritime culture not typical of other Russian subethnic groups. Moreover, the Russian North used to be home to numerous Old Believer communities fleeing persecution in Central Russia.

Since the late 20th century, the Russian North has been suffering from depopulation, both urban and (especially) rural. For instance, the population of Umba declined from 8,309 in 1989 to 4,031 in 2023. Numerous villages have been entirely abandoned by their former inhabitants.

== In film ==
There is a crowdfunded documentary film about the region, Atlantis of the Russian North (2015).

Many award-winning feature films were shot on locations in the Russian North: e.g., The Island (2006), The Postman's White Nights (2014), and Leviathan (2014).

== See also ==
- Novgorod Republic
- Northern Russian dialects
- Northern Thebaid
- Russky Sever National Park
- Northern economic region (Russia)
- Far North (Russia)
