= Yury Iosifovich Koval =

Russian author

- Born: February 9, 1938; Moscow, Soviet Union
- Died: August 2, 1995 (aged 57); Moscow, Russia
- Occupations: Writer, screenwriter, poet, artist
- Writing career
- Genre: Children's literature

Yury Iosifovich Koval (Russian: Юрий Иосифович Коваль, February 9, 1938 in Moscow – August 2, 1995 in Moscow) was a Russian author, artist, and screenplay writer.

== Biography ==
Yury Koval was born in Moscow in 1938. Both of his parents came from peasant families. His Ukrainian father Iosif Yakovlevich Koval was a criminal investigator, while his mother Olga Dmitrievna Kolybina was a psychiatrist of Russian origin. In 1955 Yuri begun his studies at the Moscow State Pedagogical Institute, and in 1960, he graduated and started working as a drawing teacher in the countryside in the Republic of Tatarstan. After a year, he returned to Moscow, working first as a schoolteacher and subsequently as an editor in the Detskaya Literatura magazine. In 1966, he became a freelance journalist and writer.

Koval published sporadically since he was a student, and in 1967 and 1969 he published two books of verses for children, however, he was first noticed in 1968, when he published Aly, a short story of a dog. He subsequently decided to change topic frequently. He spent considerable periods of time in the north of European Russia, in particular, in Vologda Oblast. In Arkhangelsk, Yury Koval met Boris Shergin, a Russian Pomor writer, and became interested in Russian folklore. Later, he invested a lot of time promoting literary works of Shergin and Stepan Pisakhov, and even wrote a screenplay for animated films The Magic Ring (Russian: Волшебное кольцо) and Laughter and Grief by the White Sea, based on Shergin's fairy tales.

In the 1970s, Koval wrote several short stories and novels for children. The Little Silver Fox (1975) shows the story of an Arctic fox who escaped from a fur farm and wanted to get to the North Pole. In 1984, he published The lightest boat in the world, and Suyer-Vyyer was published in 1996 posthumously. For Suyer-Vyyer, Koval received the Strannik Literary Award, which is given for science fiction books. Koval's books were translated to all major European languages, as well as to Chinese and Japanese.

In addition to his writing and screenwriting work, Yuri was also a professional sculptor, artist, icon painter, enameller and woodcarver. He mastered a wide range of techniques, mostly traditional national Russian styles. He also wrote songs and played guitar.

Koval died in 1995 at the age of 57 after a serious heart attack. He was buried in the family tomb at the Lianozovskoe Cemetery. He was survived by his second wife Natalia Alexandrovna Koval (nee Degtyar), his children (Yulia from the first marriage and Alexei from the second marriage) and his elder brother Boris. Koval belonged to the Russian Orthodox Church.

== Literary works ==
Koval is the author of several novels, novellas and collections of short stories and fairy-tales, both for children and adults. He has also written poems and songs. His major works in prose include:

- Алый (Aly, titled after the proper name of a dog, 1968), about a border guard dog;
- Приключения Васи Куролесова (The Adventures of Vasya Kurolesov, 1971), a humorous detective story;
- Недопёсок (Young Polar Fox, 1975), about the adventures of an Arctic fox;
- Пять похищенных монахов (Five Abducted Monks, 1977), a humorous detective story;
- От Красных Ворот (Starting from Red Gate, titled after a Moscow toponym, 1984);
- Самая лёгкая лодка в мире (The Lightest Boat in the World, 1984), the first Koval's major work addressed to adult audience;
- Полынные сказки (Wormwood Tales, 1987);
- Промах гражданина Лошакова (Citizen Loshakov's Failure, 1990), a humorous detective story;
- Шамайка (Shamayka, titled after the name of a cat, 1990), about a stray cat (adaptation of Ernest Thompson Seton's story, The Slum Cat);
- Суер-Выер (Suyer-Vyyer, 1995), a fantastic novel about a sea voyage of Captain Suyer-Vyyer striving to find the Island of Verity.

He translated into Russian various children's writers and poets, including Rainis, Imants Ziedonis, Eduardas Mieželaitis, Spiridon Vangheli, Akhmedkhan Abu-Bakar, Michio Mado, Yoko Sano, etc.

=== English editions ===
- Yuri Koval. A Pig in a Poke. London: Abelard-Schuman, 1975. — Illustrated by Janosch. ISBN 0200723324 (Translation of Priklyucheniya Vasi Kurolesova, 1971)
- Yuri Koval. A Purple Bird / Translated by Fainna Solasko. Moscow: Raduga, 1983. 2nd printing, 1989. — Illustrated by Nikolay Ustinov. (Translation of 14 stories from the collection Pozdnim vecherom ranney vesnoy, 1988)
- Yuri Koval. The Little Silver Fox / Translation by Nora Seligman Favorov. Chtenia: Readings from Russia. 2008. Vol. 1, no. 1. (01: The Hearts of Dogs). (Excerpt from Nedopesok, 1975)
- Yuri Koval. The Lightest Boat in the World / Translation by Paul E. Richardson. Chtenia: Readings from Russia. 2008. Vol. 1, no. 3. (03: On the Road). (Excerpt from Samaya legkaya lodka v mire, 1984)
- Yury Koval. The Red Gates. In: Moscow Tales. Stories translated by Sasha Dugdale; Edited by Helen Constantine. Oxford: Oxford University Press, 2013. P. 83-128. (Translation of a novella Ot Krasnyx vorot, 1984)

== Cinema and animation ==
Some of Koval's works were made into feature films:

- Border dog Alyi (1979)
- Nedopesok Napoleon III (1979) (based on Nedopesok)
- Pyat pokhishchennykh monakhov (1991) (based on the eponymous novel)
- Yavlenie prirody (2010) (based on various short stories)

He wrote the screenplays for several short animation films, and many animation films are based on his works, including:

- Priklyucheniya Vasi Kurolesova (1981)
- Tigryonok na podsolnukhe (1981)
- Welcome (1986)
- Sunduk (1986)
- Laughter and Grief by the White Sea (1988)
- Yevstifeyka-volk (2001)
- Polynnaya skazka v tri blina dlinoy (2003)
- Pro barana i kozla (2004)
- Pro kozla i barana (2005)
- Glupaya... (2008)
- Krugly god (2010)
- Shatalo (2010)

Koval also appeared in small supporting roles in two movies (in both cases he sings his songs playing a guitar):

- Ulitsa Nyutona, dom 1 (1963)
- Marka strany Gondelupy (1978)
