= Pomor dialects =

Group of North Russian dialects

Pomor Russian
- Native to: Russia
- Region: Arkhangelsk Oblast, Murmansk Oblast, Karelia, Nenets Autonomous Okrug, Komi Republic
- Ethnicity: 3,113 Pomors (2010)
- Language family: Indo-European: Balto-Slavic; Slavic; East Slavic; Russian; North; Pomor Russian
- Early form: Old Novgorod dialect

Language codes
- ISO 639-3: –
- Glottolog: pomo1275
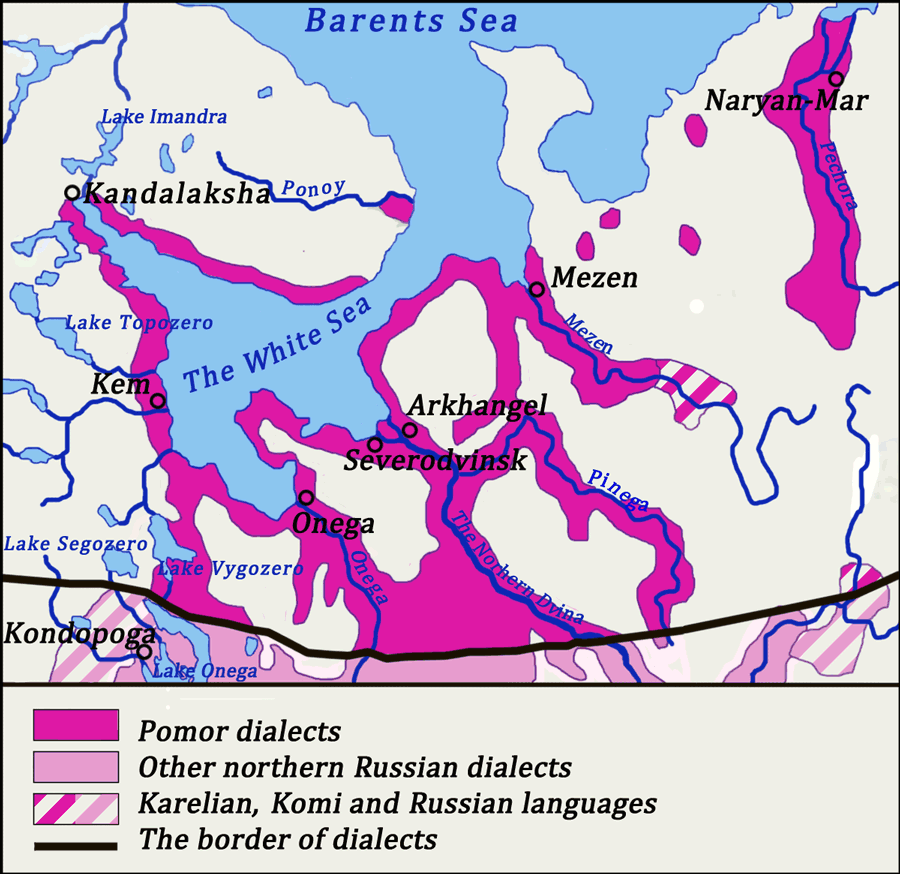
- Pomor dialects

Pomor dialects (Russian: Помо́рские го́воры) are a group of Northern Russian dialects spoken by the Pomors of the former Arkhangelsk Governorate and northern parts of the Olonets and Vologda Governorates. They are heavily influenced by the Old Novgorod dialect and contain a substantial number of both archaisms and borrowings from Uralic and Scandinavian languages.

The Novgorod dialect spoken in Medieval Russia was the predecessor to the Pomor dialects. The Uralic people of Bjarmia changed from their own dialects to Pomor in a five-century-long process, enriching it with some Uralic vocabulary. The Pomor people were involved in trade with Norway, so they borrowed some vocabulary from the North Germanic languages too. During the Soviet period, the Pomors were compelled to shift to standard Russian.

Pomor is now a dying form of speech and only a few thousand speakers remain. There is no education in Pomor; so the only way to learn it is by self-study. Most parents teach their children standard Russian and not Pomor. Pomor is almost extinct in Karelia and the Kola Peninsula, with the remaining speakers living the Arkhangelsk Region. But there has been fresh interest in Pomor and there are revival efforts.

The study of the Pomor dialects was undertaken by Ivan Merkuryev (1924-2001), a professor of philology and author of several books including Живая речь кольских поморов ("The Living Speech of the Kola Pomors"). The Pomor dialects are widely used in literary works by Boris Shergin and Stepan Pisakhov. They also influenced the poetic language of Nikolai Klyuev.

Pomor dialects are spoken in the animated films of Leonid Nosyrev, many of which are adaptations of stories by Shergin and Pisakhov. One example is Laughter and Grief by the White Sea (1987).
