= Bird of Happiness =

Bird of happiness can refer to:

- Bird of Happiness (toy), traditional Russian wooden carved toy.
- The Bird of Happiness (film), a 1993 Spanish drama film directed by Pilar Miró.
