= Laughter and Grief by the White Sea =

- Directed by: Leonid Nosyrev
- Written by: Leonid Nosyrev; Yury Koval; Boris Shergin (story); Stepan Pisakhov (story); Genrikh Sapgir (lyrics)
- Starring: Tatyana Vasilyeva; Klara Rumyanova; Yevgeny Leonov; Anatoly Barantsev; Maria Vinogradova; Kira Smirnova; Yuri Volyntsev; Boris Novikov; Zinaida Popova (vocals)
- Edited by: Olga Vasilenko
- Music by: Yevgeny Botyarov
- Release date: 1987
- Running time: 60 minutes
- Country: Soviet Union
- Language: Russian

Laughter and Grief by the White Sea (Russian: Смех и го́ре у Бе́ла мо́ря; tr.:Smekh i gore u Bela morya) is a 1987 Soviet traditionally animated feature film directed by Leonid Nosyrev made at the Soyuzmultfilm studio. The film is a celebration of the culture of the Russian Pomors who live around the White Sea.

It is based on stories by folklorists and writers Boris Shergin and Stepan Pisakhov, except for the last segment which is based on a real event that happened in 1857.

== Plot ==
In the evening, several Pomor men have brought in their boats for the day and are relaxing in a fishermen's hut by the light of a kerosene lamp. The eldest of them named Senya Malina (on his behalf is narrated in the Pisahov's tales) tells them that "there has been so much untruth told about our Arkhangelsk region" that he wants to set the record straight and tell the whole truth and nothing but the truth. With that said, he begins his first tale.

=== Eternal Icebergs (Вечны льдины) ===
A tale by Stepan Pisakhov of how the villagers of the Arkhangelsk Governorate (along with the polar bears who work for them) sell "eternal icebergs", which they use in place of boats.

=== About the Bear (Про медведя) ===
A tale by Stepan Pisakhov. Because this is, after all, the North, no brown bears are allowed in the villages – only white polar bears. This is a tale about a brown bear who finds some baking powder, makes himself white, and attempts to sneak into a village.

=== Frozen Songs (Морожены песни) ===
A tale by Stepan Pisakhov. In the winter, it sometimes gets so cold that words freeze as soon as they come out of your mouth. This tale is about how a German merchant buys frozen songs from the people and shows them to a packed concert hall in Germany. The Merchant theme is Beatles' Ob-La-Di, Ob-La-Da melody, played on Russian folk instruments.

=== The Magic Ring (Волшебное кольцо) ===
A tale by Boris Shergin about a young peasant named Ivan who lives in poverty with his single mother. In an attempt to make some money for a living, Ivan decides to sell first his hat, then his shirt and finally, his fancy blazer. But every time he tries to go to the market to sell his clothes, he ends up meeting the same man who abuses various animals, and gives him all his possessions in exchange for these animals. This way he rescues a cat, a dog and, finally, a snake, who eventually reveals to be a snake princess and, for Ivan's good treatment of her, gives him a magic ring that can basically do anything the wearer wishes.

With his new ring, Ivan starts wishing for food in the house, then for a new house, clothes and everything else that he didn't have before. Now living rich, he impresses the Tsar with a brand-new crystal bridge built for him overnight and demands one of his daughters' hand in marriage. Yet his new wife, an extremely unpleasant and selfish Ulyana, already has a lover in Paris. She tricks Ivan, takes his ring away and wishes to immediately go alone to Paris with Ivan's house and the crystal bridge, while Ivan ends up thrown into a prison for bridge thievery. After this, Ivan's cat and dog travel on their own to Paris, successfully retrieve the ring and return it to Ivan. With his ring back, Ivan wishes to return everything he used to own back home, including Ulyana, refuses to have any affairs with anyone of the Tsar's family and settles down with a nice girl from the village.

=== The Sawess (Перепилиха) ===
A tale about a woman who meets a bear while in the woods, screams in fear and realizes she has an extremely powerful voice, so powerful that it makes the bear faint and cuts through everything (hence the name). She takes the bear home as a trophy and yells at her husband so much that she bores a hole through his chest. However, the husband finds that the hole whistles when he breathes and that he can now sing with accompaniment. Finally, the Sawess's voice is put to a good use — cutting trees for the men.

=== The Orange (Апельсин) ===
A tale about how the narrator once accidentally threw an orange overboard while crossing the river. The orange proceeds to grow into a huge tree (growing in the middle of the river) with one gigantic orange-shaped fruit at its top. No one of the local people is able to cut the fruit, so they decide to bring in the Sawess. The fruit turns out to be full of hundreds of oranges which rain down on the deck of the ship. The people decide to stitch up the burst orange so it could stay where it was, and in the polar winter, they find that it has absorbed the sun's light from the summer and gives them light during the whole season.

=== Ivan and Andrian (Иван и Андреян) ===
With the evening getting later, the old man tells a more serious tale. The tale is about two fishermen who decide to spend the night on a small rocky island in the sea. At night a huge storm comes upon them and sinks their boat. Left on the island with no hope of escape or rescue, and knowing that they are going to die, they come to the conclusion the nobody is going to have anything to remember them by and so decide to carve their story on the piece of wood which they used for cutting fish. Meanwhile, their mother sings a song lamenting their deaths. The younger dies 6 weeks later, and the date of death of the older is not recorded on the beautifully carved board.

With his last tale finished, the old man asks his audience if they are asleep. "We're living", one of them answers.

Ivan and Andrian was set in 1857.

== Creators ==
| | English | Russian |
|---|---|---|
| Director | Leonid Nosyrev | Леонид Носырев |
| Script | Leonid Nosyrev; Yury Koval | Леонид Носырев; Юрий Коваль |
| Art Director | Vera Kudryavtseva-Yengalycheva | Вера Кудрявцева-Енгалычева |
| Artists | Svetlana Davydova; Vladimir Zakharov | Светлана Давыдова; Владимир Захаров |
| Animators | Renata Mirenkova; Aleksey Pukin; Lyudmila Lobanova; Yuriy Kuzyurin; Viktor Lihachyov; Marina Rogova; Marina Voskanyants; Anatoliy Abarenov; Yelena Malashenkova; Oleg Komarov; Iosif Kuroyan | Рената Миренкова; Алексей Пукин; Людмила Лобанова; Юрий Кузюрин; Виктор Лихачёв; Марина Рогова; Марина Восканьянц; Анатолий Абаренов; Елена Малашенкова; Олег Комаров; Иосиф Куроян |
| Camera Operator | Aleksandr Chekhovskiy | Александр Чеховский |
| Executive Producer | Lyubov Butyrina | Любовь Бутырина |
| Composer | Yevgeny Botyarov | Евгений Ботяров |
| Sound Operator | Vladimir Kutuzov | Владимир Кутузов |
| Script Editor | Natalya Abramova | Наталья Абрамова |
| Voice Actors | Tatyana Vasilyeva; Klara Rumyanova; Yevgeny Leonov; Anatoly Barantsev; Maria Vinogradova; Kira Smirnova; Yuri Volyntsev; Boris Novikov | Татьяна Васильева; Клара Румянова; Евгений Леонов; Анатолий Баранцев; Мария Виноградова; Кира Смирнова; Юрий Волынцев; Борис Новиков |
| Editor | Olga Vasilenko | Ольга Василенко |
| Vocals | Zinaida Popova | Зинаида Попова |

== Notes ==
The first six stories, without the connecting sequences, were previously released in three separate films (in 1977, 1979 and 1986). Eternal Icebergs and Frozen Songs were also released separately, before being merged in 1977 (including About the Bear) into a film called Ne lyubo — ne slushay (Не любо — не слушай, roughly translated as "Don't Like It — Don't Listen"). The third short film, which featured The Sawess and The Orange stories, was released under the name Novels of Arkhangelsk (Архангельские новеллы).

The last story, Ivan and Andrian, was also released as a separate short film in 1987 under the name Pomorskaya Byl (Поморская быль, roughly translated as "A True Story of the Pomors"). About 8 minutes of connecting sequences were made specifically for the feature film.

The film is currently available on DVD in editions by Soyuz Video and Krupnyy Plan (none of them with subtitles).

== Historical basis for "Ivan and Andrian" ==
The last tale is based upon a real carved epitaph that was found on a nameless island in the Arctic Ocean. The art and text carved onto it was recorded by Boris Shergin. The name "Ondriyan" is changed to "Andrian" in the film, and the epitaph is shortened from the original.

Here is the literal translation of the original epitaph from Russian (no rhymes as in the original):

The shipwrights, Ivan and Ondriyan,
Here ended their earthly labours,
And collapsed into the long rest,
And wait for the archangel's horn.
In the autumn of 1857
Thunderous bad weather enveloped the sea.
By God's judgement or by our own dumb error
Our boat was lost with our fishing gear and provisions,
And we, brothers, were forced on this barren rock
To wait for the hour of death.
To distract our minds from timeless boredom
To this whole board we applied our determined hands...
Ondriyan graced this frame with carvings for mirth,
Ivan wrote the chronicle for disclosing
That we are of Lichutin kin, sons of Grigoriy,
Mezen townsmen.
And remember us, all who sail past
These parts of the ocean-sea.

Original Russian text:

Корабельные плотники Иван с Ондреяном
Здесь скончали земные труды,
И на долгий отдых повалились,
И ждут архангеловой трубы.
Осенью 1857 года
Окинула море грозна непогода.
Божьим судом или своей оплошкой
Карбас утерялся со снастьми и припасом,
И нам, братьям, досталось на здешней корге
Ждать смертного часу.
Чтоб ум отманить от безвременной скуки,
К сей доске приложили мы старательны руки.
Ондриян ухитрил раму резьбой для увеселения,
Иван летопись писал для уведомления,
Что родом мы Личутины, Григорьевы дети,
Мезенски мещана.
И помяните нас все плывущие
В сих концах моря-окияна.

== See also ==
- Adult animation
- History of Russian animation
- List of animated feature-length films
