= Bird of Happiness (toy) =

Traditional Russian wooden toy

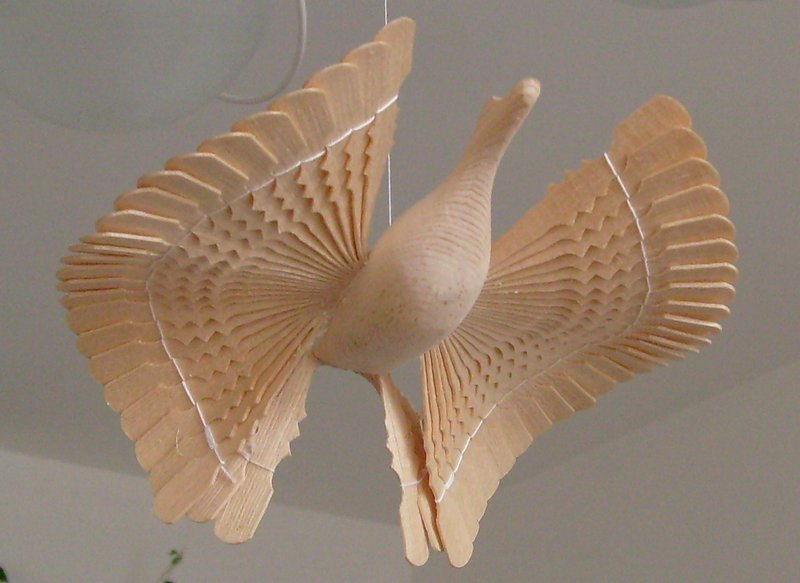
Wood Chip Bird known as "Bird of Happiness"

Bird of Happiness (Russian: пти́ца сча́стья, romanized: ptitsa schast'ya [ˈptʲitsə ˈɕːasʲtʲjə]), also called Pomor dove is the traditional North Russian wooden toy, carved in the shape of a bird. It was invented by Pomors, the inhabitants of the coasts of the White and Barents Seas. It is suspended inside a house, guarding the family hearth and well-being. From the movement of warm air, they revolved in a circle.

== History ==
According to superstitious legends, Wood Chip Bird (Bird of Happiness) brings many benefits to the house. In addition, this bird is the symbol of the sun. The bird was hung in the house as the hearth and well-being keeper. These birds used to hang in almost every home of a farmer in the icon corner, above the dining table, opposite the Russian stove or over a child's cradle.

In the far North in Arkhangelsk province, there lived a hunter. Winter in the North is long and cold: snowstorm, blizzard and freezing cold. This year the winter stayed for a long time and cooled the hunter's house completely and the hunter's younger son fell ill. He was ill for a long time, got very thin and pale; neither doctors nor wise men could help him. The hunter grieved. He felt sorry for the little boy. The hunter asked his son: "What do you want?" The boy whispered quietly: "I want to see the sun...". And where can you get the sun in the North? The hunter was lost in thoughts, heated the furnace to warm the house. But the fire is not the sun.

Suddenly the hunter noticed a splinter that was glowing in the fire. A smile lit up his face; and he knew how to help his son. The hunter was working all the night. He carved a wood bird, made wood chips, decorated them with fretwork. He hung the bird above his son's bed, and the bird suddenly came to life: it began spinning and moving in the hot air that was coming from the furnace. The boy woke up, smiled and exclaimed: "Well, here is the sun!" From that day on, the child began to recover rapidly. So, miraculous power was attributed to the wood chip bird and it was called the "Holy spirit", the guardian of children, the symbol of family happiness.

== Wooden Structure ==
The Bird of Happiness is made mainly of cedar wood and without the use of glue or other fasteners, by carving thin petals for the bird's wings and tail and then using a special method of spreading and curving them, also found in other products of the North Russian handicraft. The amulet is usually made of pine, fir, spruce, or Siberian cedar.

Wood chip bird is a carved wooden item with thin wavy plumage of the wings. The plumage and tail of these birds were usually made of split pine, that is why the birds were called "wood chip". The place of the wooden toy origin in the form of a bird is the Arkhangelsk region. It's also called a "Pomor dove".

== See also ==
- List of toys
- Toy museums
