= Mezen wood painting =

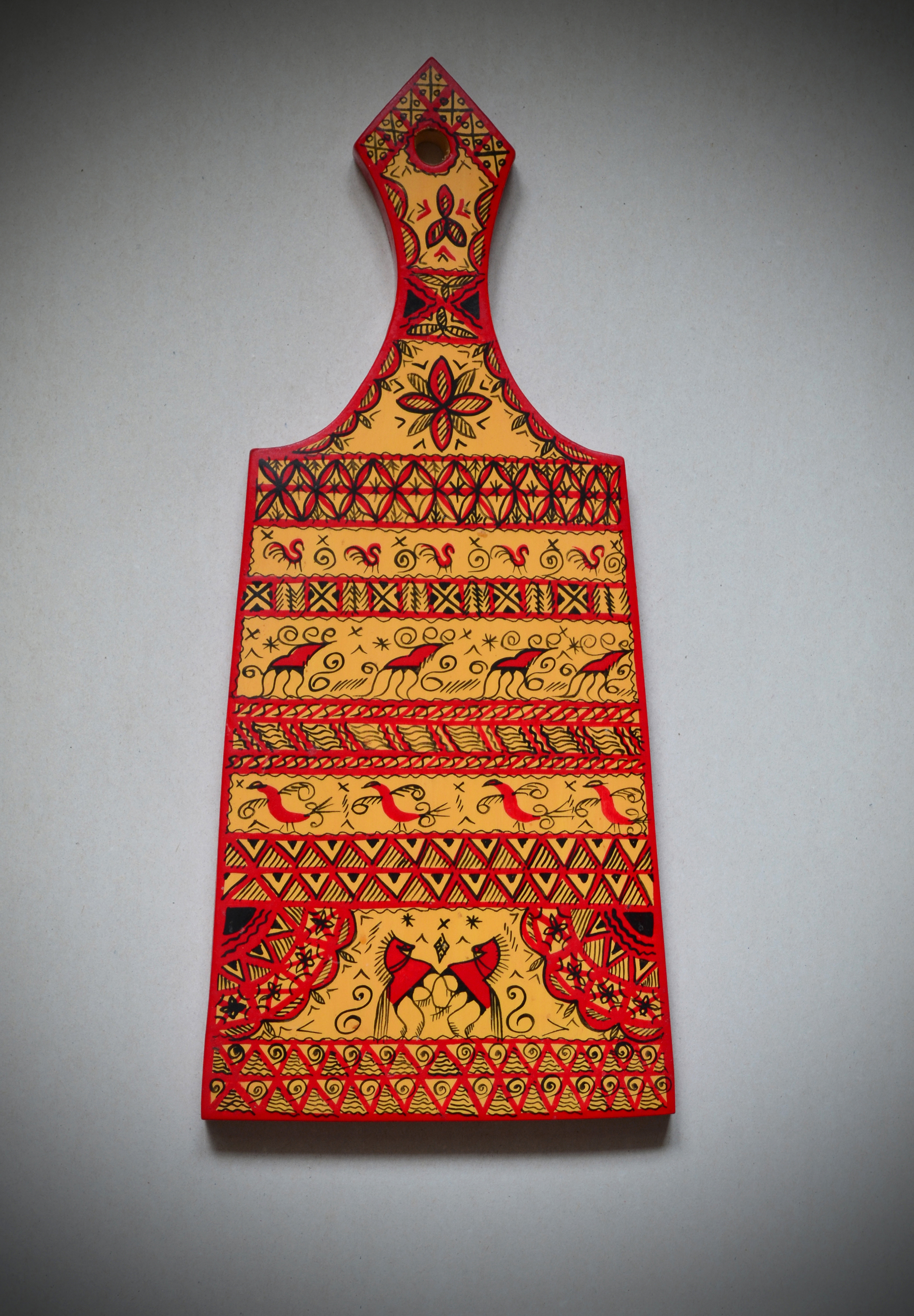
Cutting board

Mezen wood painting (Russian: Мезенская роспись по дереву) or Palashchelskaya painting (Russian: палащельская роспись) is a type of decorative painting applied to household items (spinning wheels, ladles, boxes, bratinas), which developed by the end of the 19th century in the lower basin of the Mezen River. The oldest dated spinning wheel with Mezen painting is from 1815, although pictorial motifs of this style appear in handwritten books from the 18th century produced in the Mezen region.

== Features ==
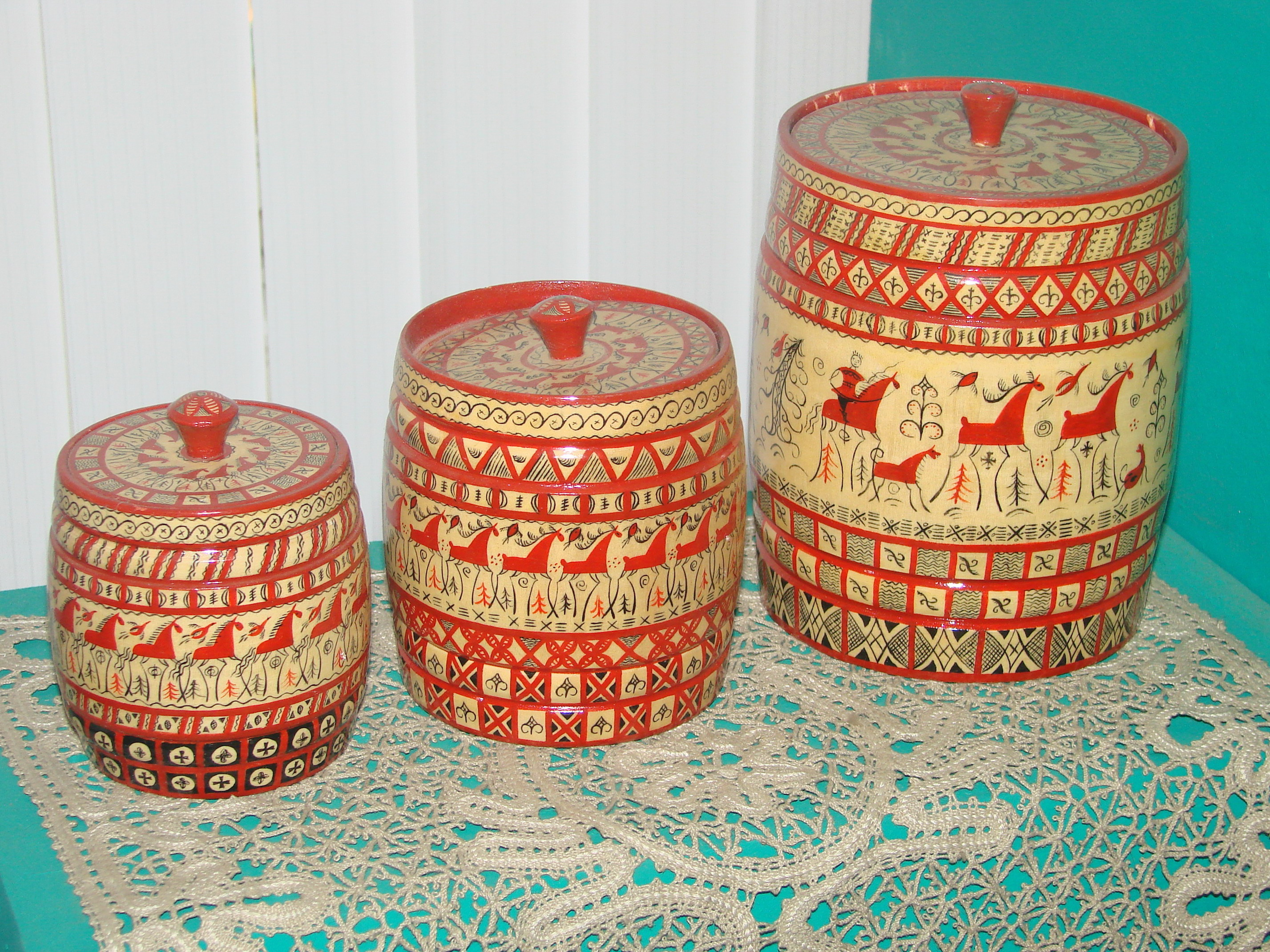
Painted barrels

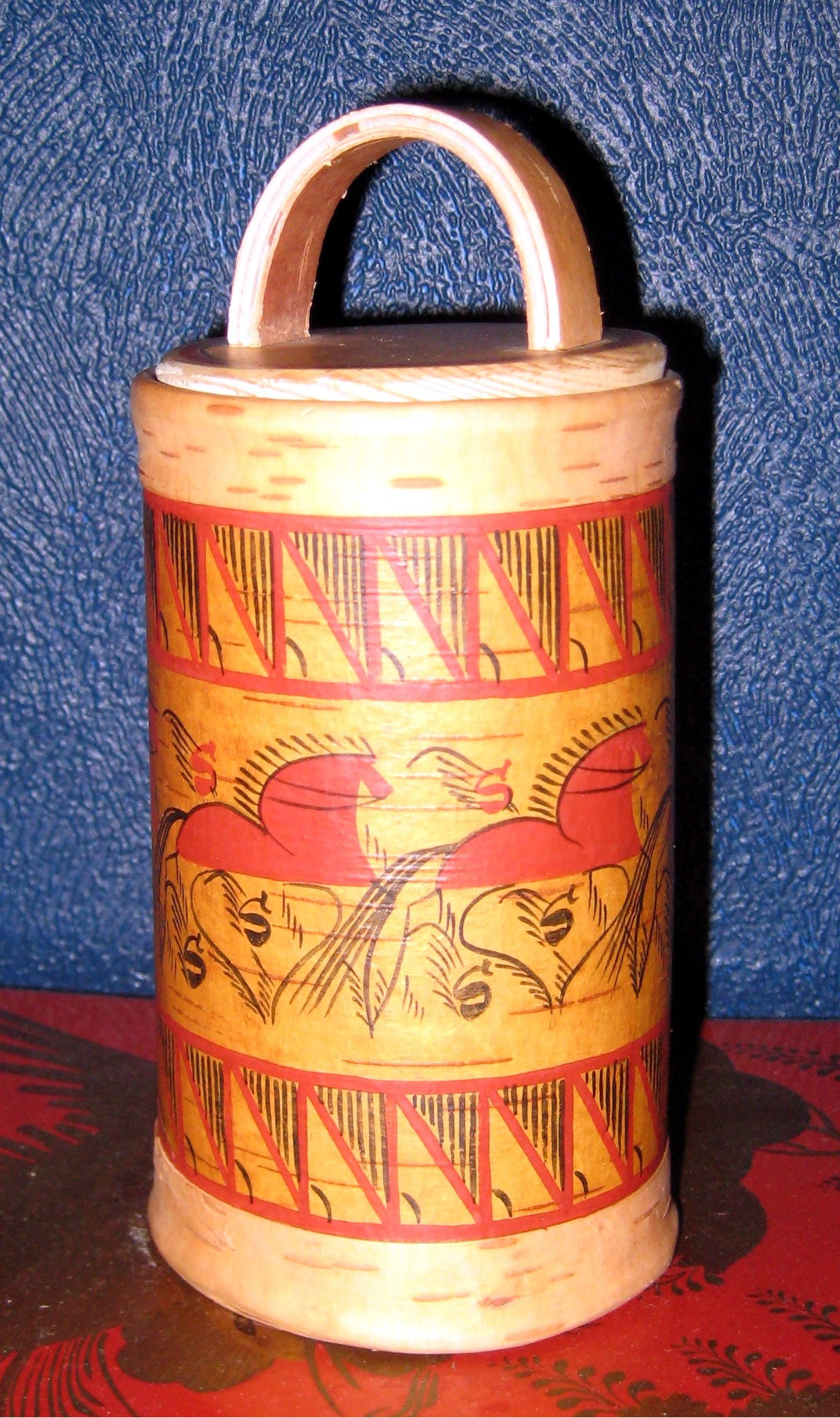
Tues by A.V. Shutihein, painted by M.P. Khokhlina

Almost all surviving items with Mezen painting were created in the late 19th and early 20th centuries. The items are densely covered with a fine pattern (stars, crosses, dashes), executed in two colors: black – soot and red – "earth paint," ochre. The main motifs of the geometric ornament – disks, rhombuses, crosses – resemble similar elements in triangular-notched carving.

Among the ornaments are friezes with stylized, schematic depictions of horses and deer, which begin and end at the item's edges. Painted in black and red, the animal figures seem to emerge from the geometric ornament. All images are very static, and only through multiple repetitions does a sense of dynamism arise. Typically, Mezen spinning wheels feature one row of deer and a row of horses below, but items with more friezes and denser, more complex ornaments also exist. The upper part of spinning wheels often includes schematic bird depictions, applied with a single stroke of red paint.

Images on the back of the spinning wheel were less ornate and freer in subject matter. Here, one might find naively drawn genre scenes: hunting, steamboat, or horses frolicking freely. Next to the images, inscriptions often appear with the name of the artist, the client, the production date, or the price of the spinning wheel.

The finished item was painted on clean, unprimed wood, first with ochre using a frayed wooden stick (tiska), then outlined in black with a grouse or capercaillie feather, and the pattern was applied with a brush made from human hair.

Mezen painting is one of the later peasant paintings. This painting represents purely ornamental decor.

== Painting technique ==
The painted item was coated with olifa, which protected the paint from wear and gave the item a golden hue.

In the late 19th century, Mezen painting became concentrated in the village of Palashchelye in Mezensky Uyezd, first mentioned as a center of wood painting in 1906. Thanks to inscriptions on spinning wheels, families of Palashchelskaya craftsmen can be identified, which is unique for typically anonymous peasant art: the Aksyonovs, Novikovs, Fedotovs, Kuzmins, and Shishovs – those who worked into the 1920s, when the craft began to decline.

In the mid-1960s, Mezen painting was revived by descendants of old Palashchelskaya craftsmen: F.M. Fedotov in Palashchelye and S.F. and I.S. Fatyanov in the village of Selishche. In Arkhangelsk, the experimental enterprise "Belomorskie Uzory" produces souvenir items with modern urban painting that imitates traditional peasant Mezen painting. In Severodvinsk, the "Dekor Severa" enterprise manufactures numerous items from wood and high-quality plywood, such as boxes, chests, kitchen sets, cutting boards, salt shakers, and more, with contemporary Mezen painting.
