= Northern Thebaid =

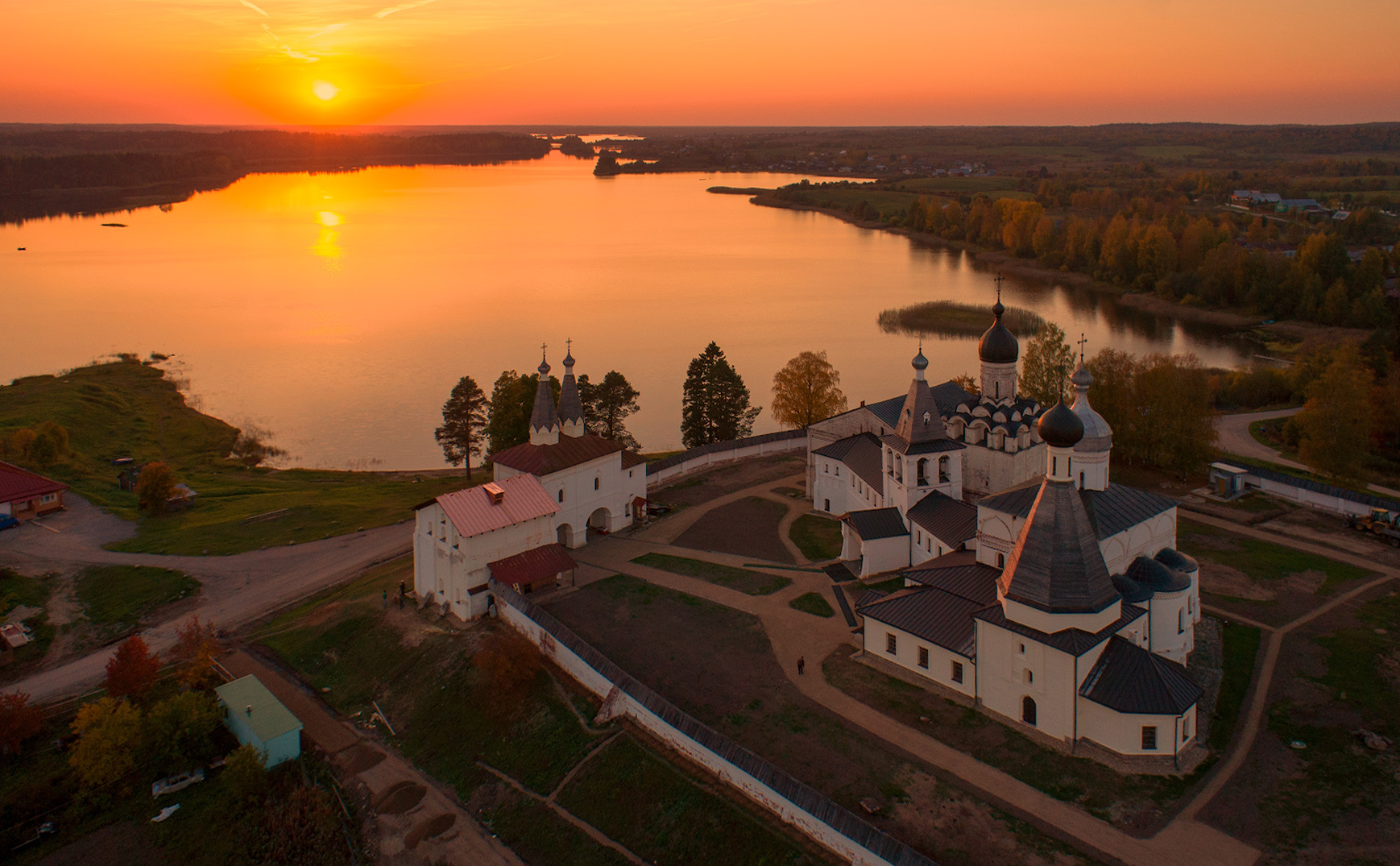
Ferapontov Monastery

Northern Thebaid (Russian: Северная Фиваида), is the poetic name of the northern Russian lands surrounding Vologda and Belozersk, appeared as a comparison with the Egyptian area Thebaid - well-known settling place of early Christian monks and hermits.

Historically Thebaid (Greek: Θηβαΐδα) is the region of Upper Egypt, the term derives from the Greek name of its capital Thebes.

The term was coined by a Russian Orthodox writer Andrei Muravyov in his book of reflections about a pilgrimage to holy places of Vologda and Belozersk, which he named "Russian Thebaid in the North" (1855).

Here in this quiet retreat, where suddenly I found my summer shelter under a hospitable roof of a welcome owner. Here I am undertaking a description of our native Thebaid which I have just visited around Vologda and Belozersk. Secular people are unlikely to know it, whereas many people have heard about the Thebaid of Egypt and have read in greek paterics about the exploits of the great Fathers, who lighted up in the harsh deserts of the Scetis and the Palestine... Over a space of more than 500 versts from the Lavra to Beloozero and further, it was like one continuous area of monks dotted with sketes and hermitages, where lay people were already forced, as it were, to settle after them and make up their monasteries' towns where only cells had previously kept to themselves. St. Sergius stands the head of all, on the southern edge of this wonderful area and sends disciples and interlocutors inside it, and St. Cyril, on the other side of it accepts newcomers and settles monasteries around himself, casting his desert nets even to the White Sea and to the Solovetsky Islands

Sometimes Northern Thebaid is more narrowly referred to as an extensive neighborhood of the St. Cyril-Belozersk Monastery. The term "Northern Thebaid" is also used as a brand, similar to the concept of the Russian North.
