= Bjarmian languages =

Extinct Finnic language of Europe

- (geographic)
- Geographic distribution: Bjarmia
- Extinct: early 2nd millennium
- Linguistic classification: Uralic: Finnic, Sámi; Bjarmian languages

Language codes
- Glottolog: None
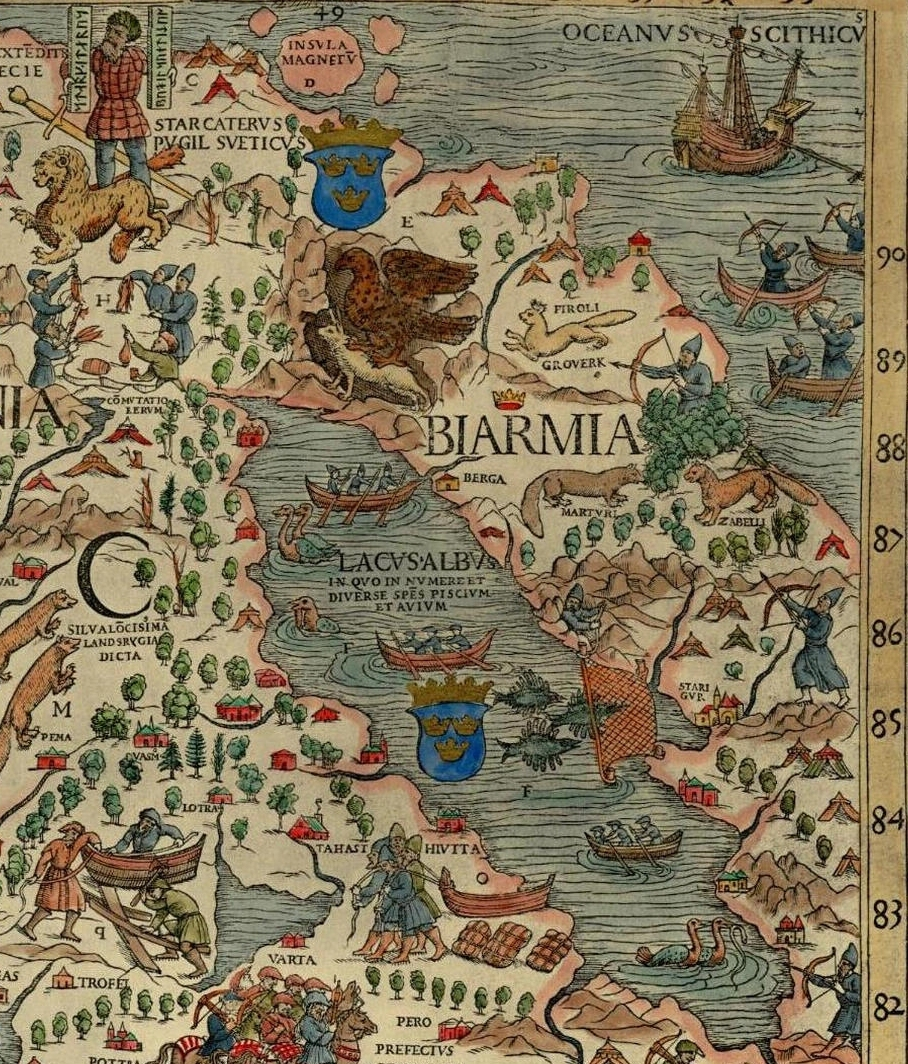
- Map of Bjarmia, where the Bjarmian languages were spoken

The Bjarmian languages are a group of extinct Finnic and Sámi languages once spoken in Bjarmia, or the northern part of the Dvina basin. Vocabulary of the languages in Bjarmia can be reconstructed from toponyms in the Arkhangelsk region, and a few words are documented by Norse travelers. Some Sámi toponyms can also be found in the Dvina basin, and Permic peoples also inhabited Bjarmaland.

== Affinities ==
There were likely many Finnic languages spoken in Bjarmia. The first one was an archaic Finnic language with the diphthong *ai instead of Finnic ei, lack of consonant gradation and the vowel /ɤ/. However, toponymic and historical data also suggest that later Karelian speakers also later migrated to the Dvina basin in the 15th and 16th centuries, just before East Slavs had arrived.

Some toponyms in Bjarmia also have the sound /ʃ/ instead of /s/.

Janne Saarikivi suggests that some Sámi languages were spoken in Bjarmia alongside Finnic languages.

== Reconstructions ==
Many toponyms in the Arkhangelsk oblast are of Finno–Ugric origin, together with the Vologda oblast. According to Aleksandr Matveyev, there are up to 100,000 such toponyms.

Bjarmian	English
*kaski	burnt-over clearing
*hattara	bush
*lauta	board
*palttV	slope
*lima	slime
*kelta	yellow
*petra	wild reindeer
*pime	dark
*haina	hay
*leettek	fine sand
*varkas	thief
*kicca	narrow
*ruske	red
*kylmä	cold

== Legacy ==
Some Finnic substrate words can be found in Northern Russian dialects, for example the words: лахта (lahta) 'marsh, moist place, meadow', луда (luda) 'rocky islet', каска (kaska) 'young woods' and щелья (schelja) 'hill or steep bank by a river'. Such words can be found in the Russian dialects around Pinega.

Gandvík is a name associated with Bjarmia that appears in Norse poems. The word could have been a Norse translation of a Finnic word, which is "Kantalahti" in Finnish. The word Vína appears in many Norse sagas that refer to Bjarmia; it is likely related to the Finnish word "Vienanmeri" (White Sea). Norse sagas also documented a Bjarmian word "Jómali", which is likely related to Finnish "Jumala" 'God'.

== See also ==
- Pomor dialects
- Karelian language
