= Pomors =

Russian ethnographic group

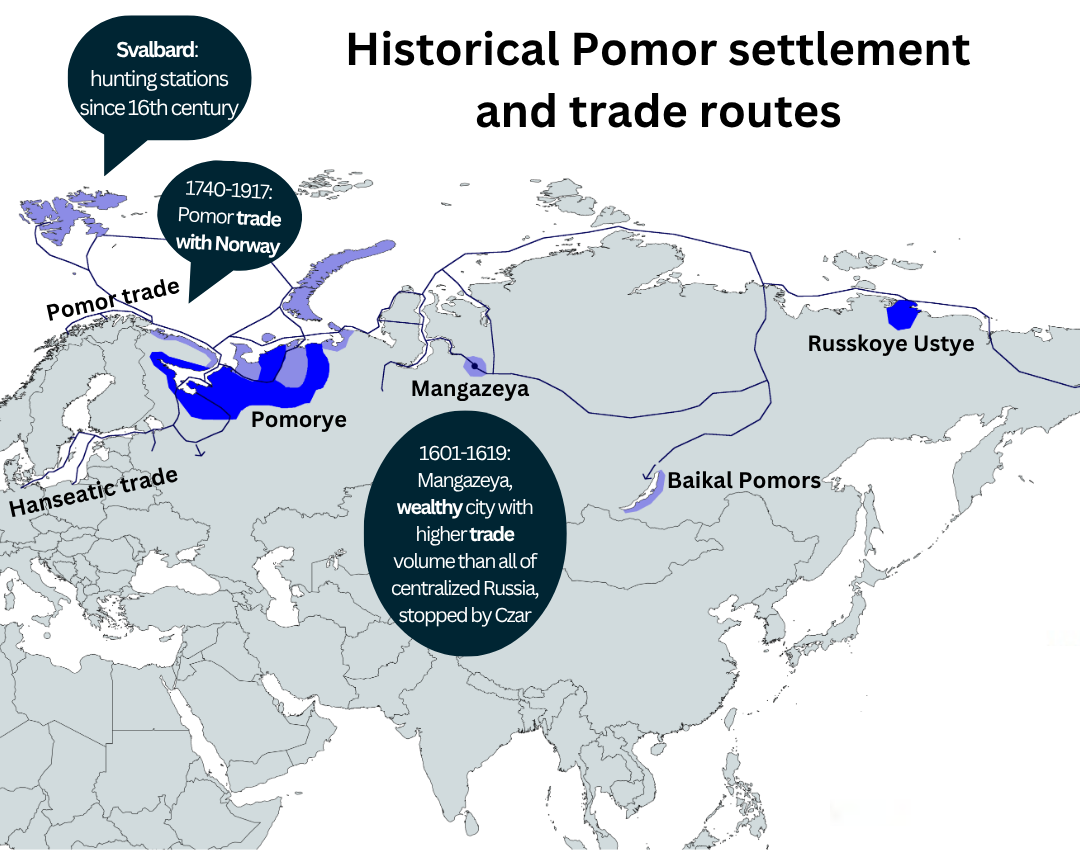
- Map of historical Pomor settlement and trade routes

Total population
- 2,232 (2020–21 census) to 500,000 (2002 informal estimate)

Regions with significant populations
- Russia: Arkhangelsk Oblast, Komi Republic and Murmansk Oblast Russia Russia: East Coast of Lake Baikal

Languages
- Pomor dialects of Russian

Religion
- Eastern Orthodox Christians, Starovers

The Pomors (Russian: помо́ры, romanized: pomory, lit. 'seasiders', IPA: [pɐˈmorɨ]) are an ethnographic group traditionally thought to be descended from Russian settlers (primarily from Veliky Novgorod) living on the White Sea and the Barents Sea coasts and nearby regions, with their southern boundary marked by a watershed dividing the White Sea basin from river basins that drain southward. Modern ethnology distinguish the wide historical term Pomors, referring to the Russian population of the northern coasts, whose livelihood depended on traditional maritime activities, from modern self-identification, the status of which remains a subject of scholarly debate.

They primarily live in the coastal areas of the Arkhangelsk Oblast. The Pomors are typically considered to be a subgroup of the Russian ethnos. They have historically played a significant role in the Russian development of Siberia. The Pomors engaged in sea mammal hunting, fishing, and trade as part of their livelihood.

== Etymology ==
The name pomor is derived from pomorye, the Russian word for coastland, from po ("by") and more ("sea"), literally meaning "by the sea". The same root appears in the toponym Pomerania (Polish: Pomorze), Pomorie (Bulgarian: Поморие : Pomorie), and Armorica (Gaulish: Aremorica) and also in the Gaulish ethnonym Morini. The term "Pomor" is poorly defined and can have different meanings. Russian ethnography posits the Pomors as a subethnic group of the Russian nation that might have unique anthropological features due to different origins and isolation but is still part of the broader Russian ethnicity. As such they are also recognized by the Russian census. However, some Pomors prefer the model of a separate ethnicity of Uralic or mixed origin that predates Russia and would thus deserve recognition as an indigenous nation. This view is often backed by international science. However, the term can also denote non-ethnic regional identity of a multiethnic or Russian Pomorye region, a socio-economic group of the White Sea coasts based around maritime hunting, fishing and salt production or an ethnographic group of the Russian ethnicity with no implied diverging origin. Generally, their ethnic self-consciousness is preserved to this day.

== History ==
As early as the 12th century, explorers from Novgorod entered the White Sea through the Northern Dvina, Mezen, Pechora and Onega estuaries and founded settlements along the seacoasts of Bjarmaland. Kholmogory served as their chief town until the rise of Arkhangelsk in the late 16th century. From their base at Kola, they explored the Barents Region, the Kola Peninsula, and Novaya Zemlya. Reliable records of the Pomors regularly visiting Novaya Zemlya and Vaygach Island date to the 16th century. One such record includes the 1556 expedition of Stephen Borough, who was escorted by the Pomors from Kuloy River in the White Sea as far as the Pechora. The settlement of Pustozersk, founded in 1499, served as an important stopover, and the Pomors organized the first private sea voyages to the region of the lower Ob and Taz.

Later, the Pomors discovered and maintained the Northern Sea Route between Arkhangelsk and Siberia. With their ships, known as koches, which were adapted for sailing this route, the Pomors penetrated to the trans-Ural areas of northern Siberia, where they founded the settlement of Mangazeya east of the Yamal Peninsula in the early 17th century, a hub between Siberia, Central Asia and the West, trading valuable goods like furs, ivory, and precious metals. In fact, by 1615 the trade volume of the city was higher than the one of all of centralized Russia combined. With the election of Czar Michael, he shut down the Pomor trade route threatening the death penalty, leading to the downfall of Mangazeya. In its function as a wealthy de facto independent city state, it has been described as a "virtual Baghdad of Siberia"

Tatyana Bratkova has reported that some historians speculate that in the early 17th century, the Pomors settled the isolated village of Russkoye Ustye in the delta of the Indigirka, in north-eastern Yakutia. The Pomors also discovered Svalbard in the 16th century or earlier, with debates whether they have been the first people to land there, and started regular hunting on the islands in the early 17th century.

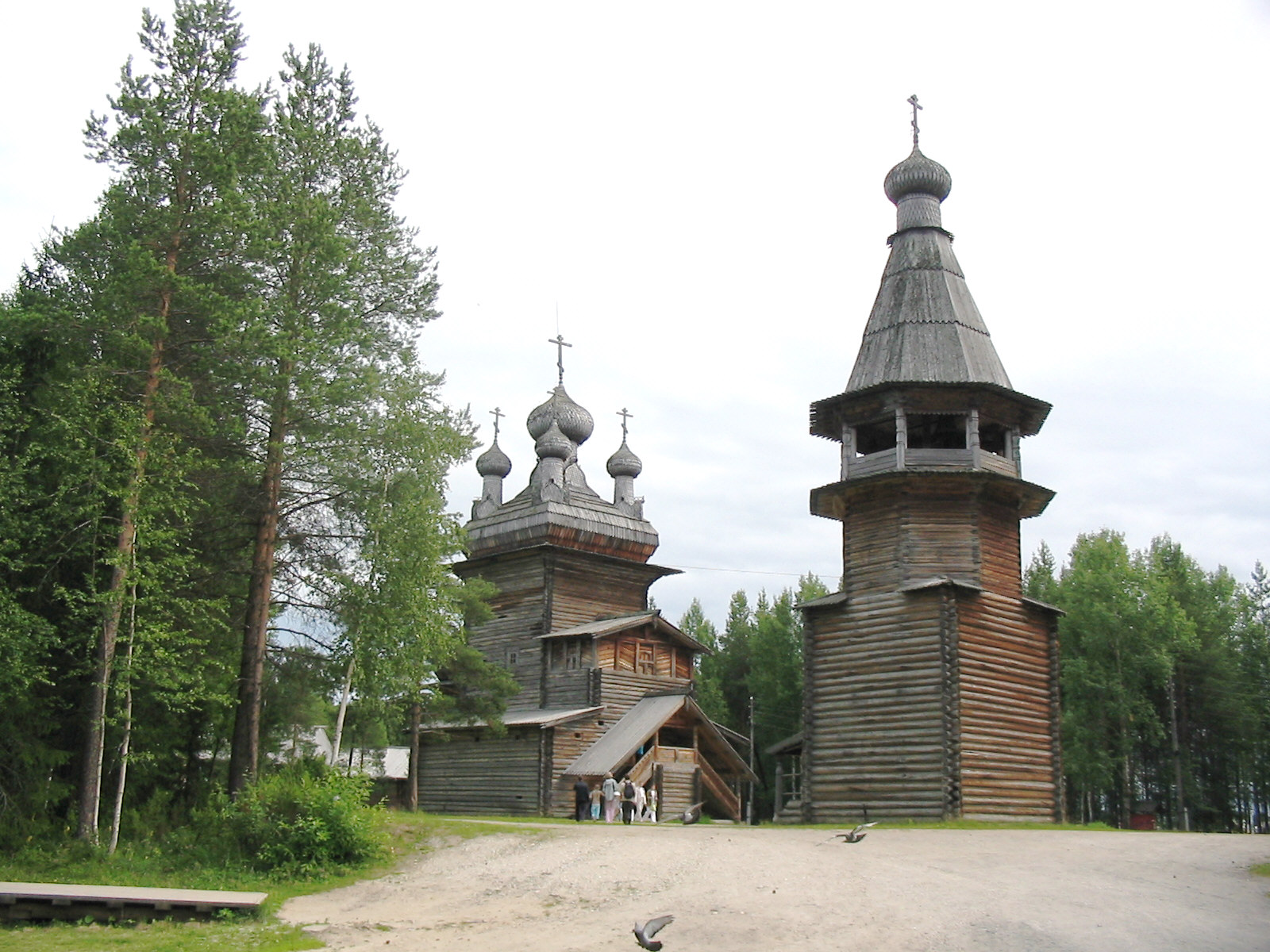
Malye Korely, a 17th-century Pomor village, 28 km east of Arkhangelsk

The term Pomor, which in the 10th–12th centuries meant "a person who lived near the sea", gradually was extended to apply to the population living relatively far from the sea. Finally, in the 15th century, the people became disconnected from the sea, which was not a major part of economy of the region. At the same time, people began using the term Pomorye to refer to a territory of practically the whole Russian North, including the Murmansk, Arkhangelsk and Vologda regions; and the Karelia and Komi Republics.

The traditional livelihoods of the Pomor based on the sea included animal hunting, whaling and fishing; in tundra regions they practiced reindeer herding. The Pomor traded by sea in corn and fish with Northern Norway, which became important to both sides. The trade was so intensive that a kind of pidgin language Moja på tvoja (or Russenorsk), from Russian and Norwegian that was developed on the Northern Norwegian coast and was used from 1750 to 1920.

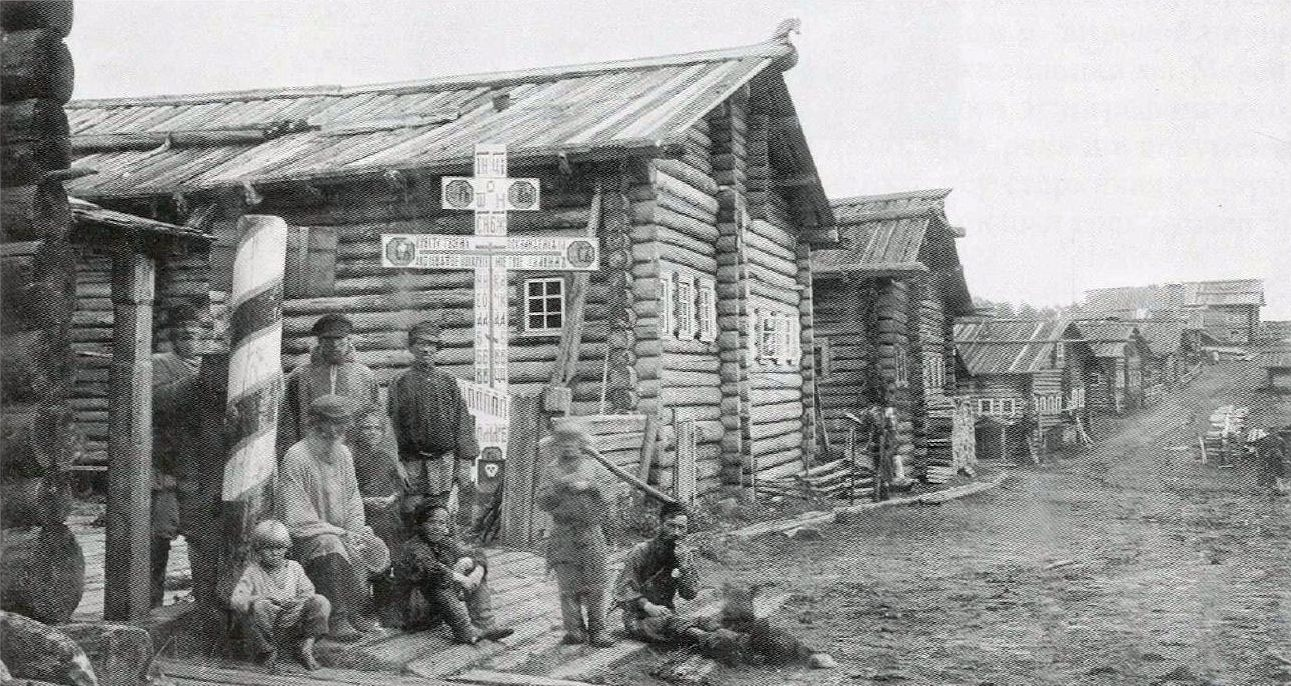
Pomor village, early 20th century

From the 12th to the 15th centuries, Pomorye was considered an extensive colony of the Russian city-state of Novgorod. By the early 16th century, the annexation of Pomorye by Moscow was completed. During the 17th century, in 22 Pomorye districts, the great bulk of the population consisted of free peasants. A portion of the land belonged to monasteries and to the Stroganov merchants. There were no landlords in Pomorye. The population of Pomorye districts was engaged in fishing, mica and salt production (Sol'-Kamskay, Sol'- Vychegodskay, Tot'ma, etc.) and other enterprises.

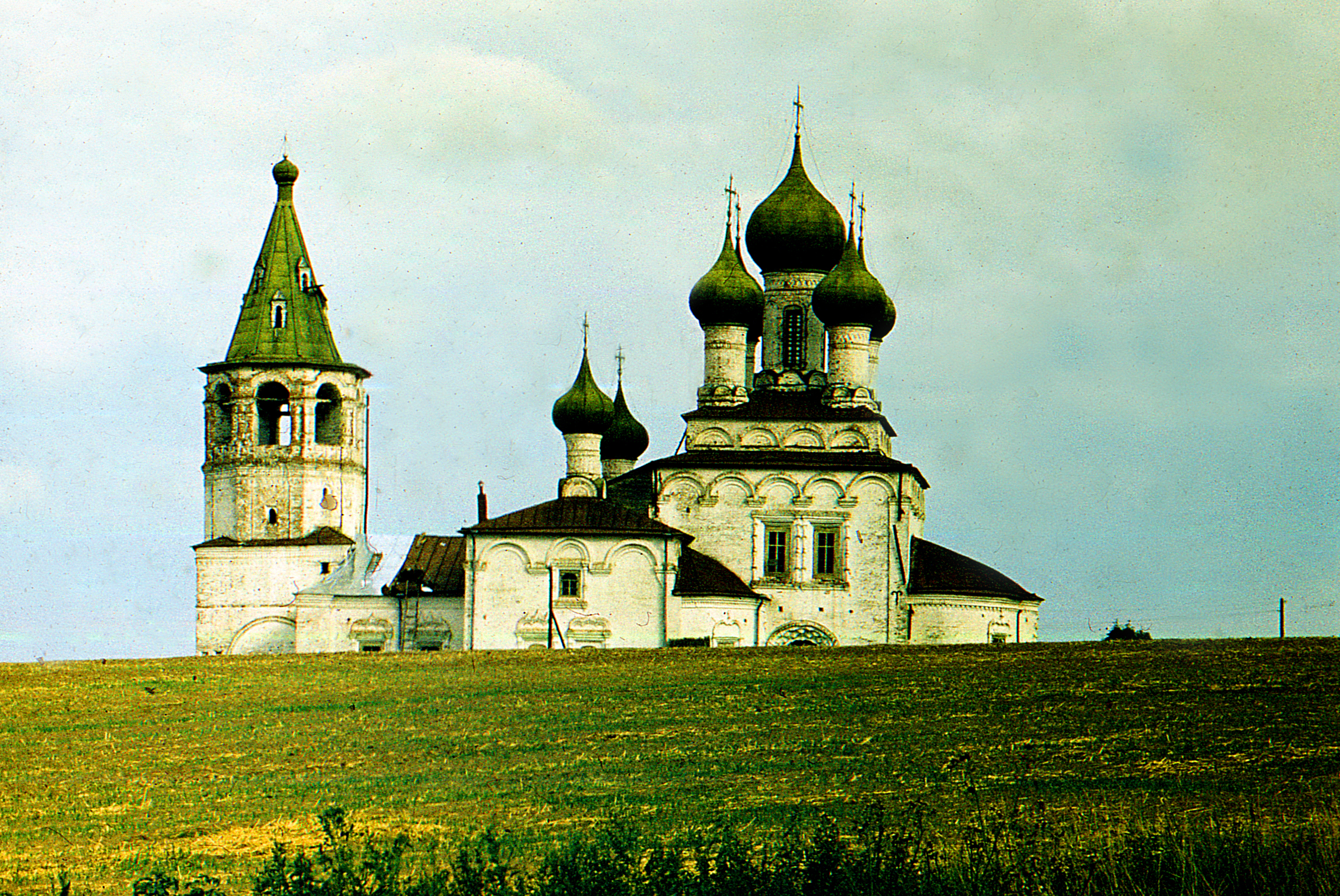
A 17th-century Pomor church near Kholmogory

The Russian Brockhaus and Efron Encyclopedic Dictionary, in its 1890–1907 edition, classified Pomors as Great Russians or referred to them as Russian traders and trappers of the North. To date, no encyclopedia or encyclopedic dictionary refers to the Pomor as a separate ethnic group.

In the 2002 Russian census, respondents had the option to identify as "Pomors", a group tabulated by the census as a subgroup of the Russian ethnicity. However, only 6,571 persons did so, almost all of them in Arkhangelsk Oblast (6,295) and Murmansk Oblast (127).

=== Historical law and customs ===
Pomor rules were bound by customary law. These were codified in many instances, creating rulebooks for various aspects of life like codices of behavior for industrialists, such as the ones of Novaya Zemlya that were bound by the naval regulations (Russian: Морской устав), or the Ustyan Rulebook (Russian: Устьянский правильник) that fused religious and profane commandments, determining their professional, business, as well as moral and ethical relations to each other. It includes statements like the legality and moral desirability of stealing from the rich to give to the poor, which will be recognized as voluntary almsgiving by the rich; Nikola Morsky, as the "quick helper", has a certain limit of directly answerable prayers without needing intervention of God, immoral men not being allowed on industrial campaigns; the decree to hospitality even in shared spaces; forgiveness after sincere apology; women not being allowed to cross their legs; and people not sitting down until an elder commands them to in his presence.

One sentence from the book underlines its deeply cosmological dimension: "If the submission to the navkler (feeder) is kept for show, and there is rumor and rebellion inside, then a demonic provident awaits us". It shows the sacralization of leadership and the sincerity that are elements of law, which explicitly refers to the "eternal commandment of the sea".

Pomors also placed a great importance on mental labor, reflected by an emphasis on education, high literacy rates and the importance of enterprise and its success, which was shared among the citizens, including care for widows and orphans, including long voyages until the Bering Strait and beyond. That emphasis on success, however, also led to practices like sending girls who were disabled or of low intelligence and skill instead of "good girls" to the monastery so that they would not tarnish the family. That meanwhile underlines the comparatively high status of women.

== Religion and worldview ==
Pomors are mostly Orthodox Christians in faith. Prior to the Revolution of 1917, many Russians from Pomorye (or Pomors) were practicing Old Believers; the Pomorian Church still has around 400,000 members. Pomor Christianity has traditionally coexisted and been infused with an animism, which is based on sacral geography in a syncretic manner, resulting in a strong environmental ethic. That led to the classification of certain animals like the beluga whale as holy and to the resistance to modern fishing techniques in the 20th century.

=== Traditional Pomor worldview ===
As part of the broader category of "cold societies" that are based around the concept of eternal return like the neighboring Sami, Nenets or Komi, the Pomor worldview reflects a complex interaction between ancient piety, shamanism, and ritualistic practices aimed at maintaining homeostasis within their communities, on the substrate of an animism but anti-pagan. However, the homeostasis is an active and fluid concept called dynamic constancy and does not represent an absolute standstill. The Pomors believed that preserving the static structure of their society was essential for survival in the environment of Pomorye, where the poet-storyteller (starinshchik) as a keeper of "deified memory" played a key role in maintaining this balance through mythopoetic expression. The poets, who were transformed shamans, were considered interpreters of the meaning of life and recreaters of it in the word. They, thereby, controlled the world and emphasized the ability of the people to engage in world-building, such as a calmer of the sea on boats. Such sacred information can also be transformed, transmitted and stored in black boxes like crosses, temples or chapels. While these structures are dynamic, applied semi-religious law was also codified in rulebooks and similar documents.

The passage from winter to summer was culturally connected to rebirth and rituals like making a sacrificial vow to the "sea god" Nikola Morsky and celebrating the farewell to sea like a funeral played a key role in the light of these philosophical elements. During the main holiday, the conjunction of Old and New Year, the demiurge defeats the bearer of chaos and death each year anew, emphasizing the concept of cyclical time and eternal return. The total sacrifice and descend into chaos which leads to the poiesis of a new world is all-encompassing and does not only apply to people, but also gods and beasts.

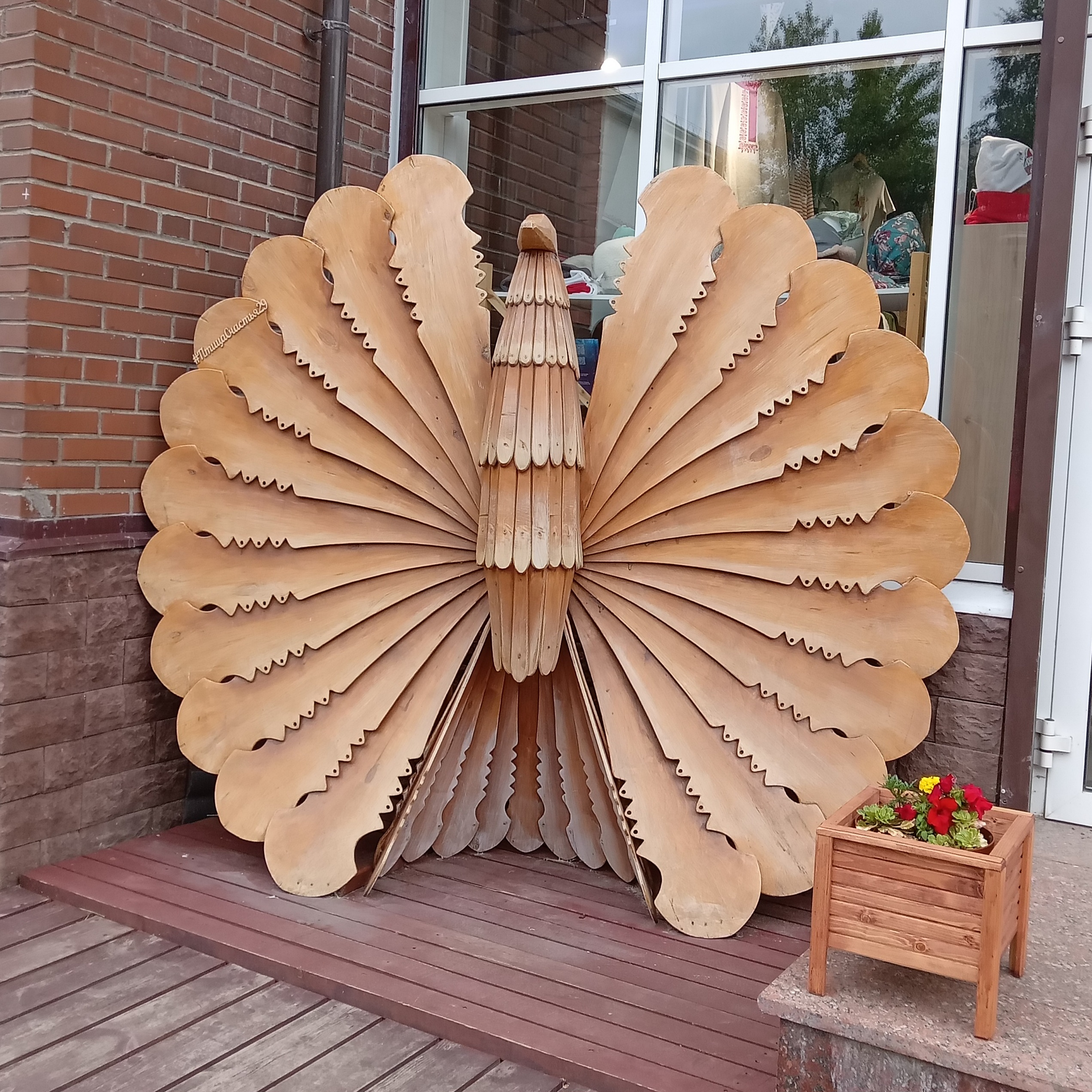
"Bird of happiness" as cultural symbol

These spiritual beliefs also played a large role in daily life, as it is a part of the "Pomor fate" to actively engage in this battle, which is not only shaped by actions but also the words of the starinshchik, the person who has knowledge of the ritual turns of speech and sacred formulas. That shows that despite a general nondualism, the Pomors had a concept of good and evil, forces that were indeed seen as in a constant fight embodied by the sacred geography of the landscape.

For example, the western wind was identified with the Antichrist. Elemental gods and goddesses play an important part in this fight, which involves good and evil spirits and forces, as they are connected with the seasons and even different times of the day. The winter is considered a dreamtime thay is ended by localized celebrations of symbolic rebirth that greet the sun, which plays a key role in Pomor mythology by being also represented by the Bird of Happiness in Pomor households.

One of the critical aspects of the Pomor spiritual world was the sacred status of the bathhouse, which was viewed as an archaic sanctuary-temple. The bathhouse played a central role in initiatory and medical rituals that symbolized the "second birth" of a person, just like the festivals connected to the sun. The connection between the bathhouse and the forge is notable, as both were considered marginal spaces associated with transformation and rebirth, drawing from their symbolic links to fire and water. The sacred geography of the Pomors placed the bathhouse on the periphery of the settlement, reinforcing its chthonic associations with both life and death.

The sea, central to Pomor life, held a significant mythopoetic meaning as a threshold between the world of the living and the world of the dead. This view of the sea as a boundary endowed navigation with profound religious significance. The Pomors regarded the northeast wind, or "polunoshnik," as a sacred force, connecting the mundane world to the mystical realms of the North, where contact with the otherworldly was inevitable. The sea, with its destructive and creative powers, was perceived as both a source of chaos and a pathway to salvation, reflecting the dual nature of the northern lands adjacent to the Polar Mountain, which were simultaneously regions of heaven and hell.

As the last two elements show, the combination of destruction and creation, life and death, or even the sacred and the mundane at the same time instead of a clear-cut separation of dual forces, is pivotal to Pomor philosophy, reminiscent of concepts like Yin and Yang. This highlights the importance of liminal spaces and thresholds. Even the sacred always has a dark side which is in this case represented by the "guardians of the threshold" while the "axis of the world" or "northern mountain" which was believed to exist behind the sea was recognized as a paradise. However, it is not possible to enter the realm of the sacred without experiencing its ambivalence and dark aspects, represented by the guardians. Elements like the "wind rose", which helped Pomor sailors navigate, were also considered to be sacred knowledge, reflecting the Pomor emphasis on education and enterprise.

The concept of islands also held a sacred significance in Pomor rituals, particularly in burial and memorial practices. Islands were seen as chthonic spaces that connected the living with the ancestors, ensuring the stability of the ethnic group's sacred traditions. In Pomor belief, these island-topos served as symbolic models of the universe, where the three co-temporal and co-spatial domains of the dead, the living, and the descendants intersected, creating a space where the past, present, and future were fused into a single continuum. Ritual remembrance, particularly through the act of memorial rites conducted on these islands, reinforced the eternal memory of the ancestors and the sacred geometry of the cosmos, thereby preserving the cultural identity of the Pomors.

Those traditions live on in modern Pomor society where a syncretic belief is widespread next to a number of (new) religious movements, which are based on traditional Pomor worldviews and emerged after the fall of the Soviet Union, which was officially atheist. Modern Pomors have a free, fluid and diverse conception of religion and may celebrate traditional holidays like the Pomor New Year in September or the Roe Deer Festival, partake in Orthodox pilgrimages, or meditate in places of power where they may also leave ribbons and coins. These traditions are however often combined into a single syncretic worldview with a topographical basis that includes local locus cults and hierotopic practices without clear boundaries between the sacred and the profane. Affiliation with the Russian Orthodox Church is low.

== Society and culture ==
=== Material culture ===
One important aesthetic feature of Pomor culture is Mezen painting, a highly symbolic style for wood and household objects, as well as the style of Palashchelye, where Pomor painting was originally developed. These are uniquely rooted in the local geography, however syncretic, combining influences not only from South Russian peasants but also from the Far East and India and decorative motives of Turkic people and Greece, including swastika motifs of pre-Aryan origin. Items like tuesa (storage boxes), polotuhi (flat boxes) and koroba (baskets) were made from birch bark. There was also a strong tradition of ceramic production, with the Pomor pottery craft rooting from the village of Timoschel'e, while metalwork like copper casting was based around Kimzha. Another one of Pomorye's most important artistic traditions is Kholmogory bone carving.

Pomor houses were traditionally very big and populated by extended families, with each of them possessing a two-story house including a gallery and a ramp, cellars, a bathhouse, a stable, granaries, and often a mill, all inside. The doors to those houses were traditionally left unlocked, one of their oldest customs. In gardens, 2–3 meters high votive or funerary crosses that were 2–3 m high could regularly be found since until the Soviet Revolution, the dead were buried next to their home.

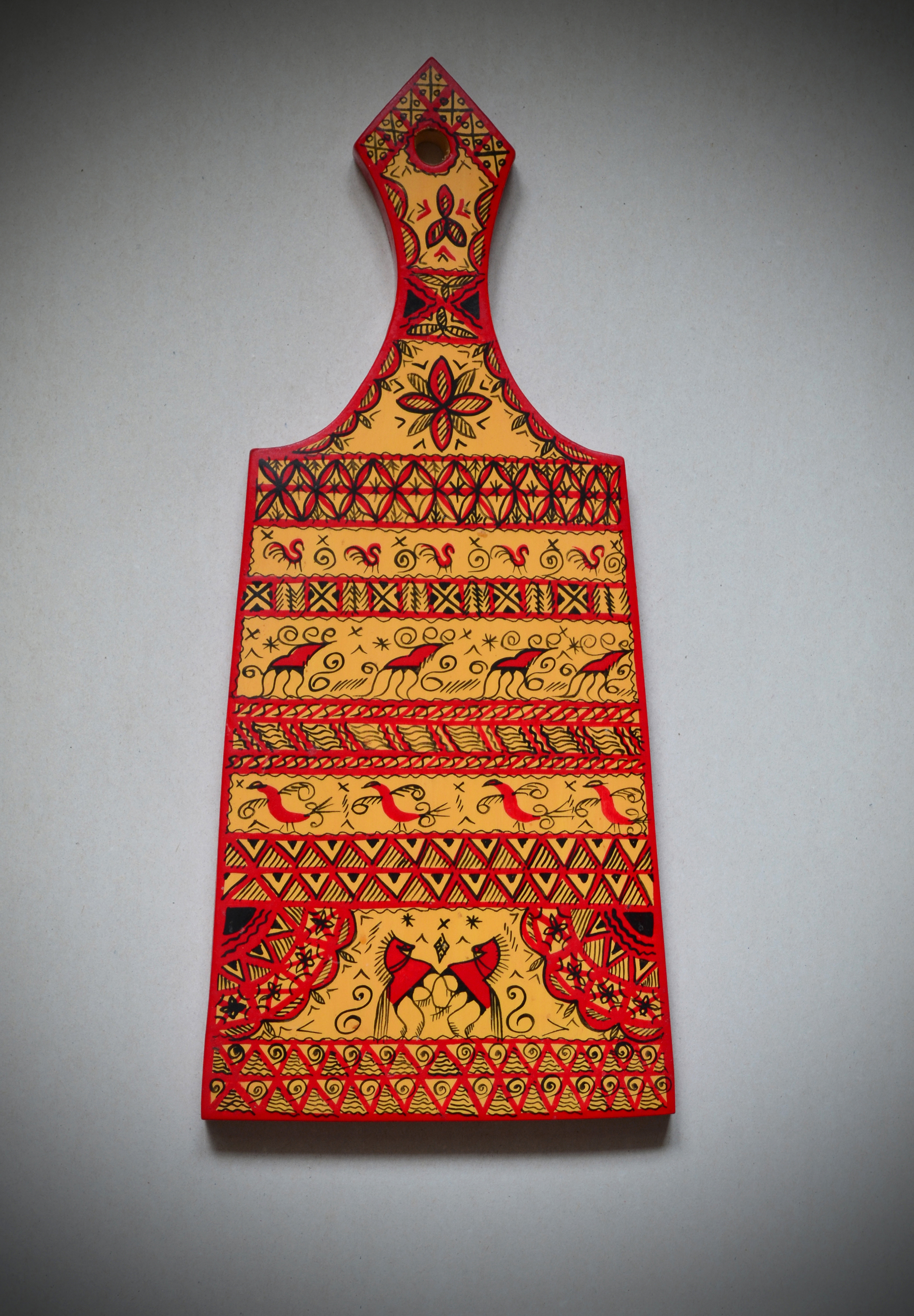
Mezen cutting board

=== Gender identity ===
In Pomorye, the social role of raspetushye (Russian: распетушье) has traditionally existed: a raspetukh (Russian: распетух) is a person of indeterminate sex who can be born intersex or a biological male with appearance, behavior, lifestyle and occupations that are closer to a woman. According to societal norms, those people did not have a certain gender and therefore had to wander around the villages. However, they were also seen as people with magical knowledge and secret skills like healing.

While never being able to be a full part of society outside of intermediate positions, they could have social contacts and, for example, sang together with the women. Nowadays, the LGBT community of the region embraces the identity instead of the term "third gender," which is seen as a Western or European construct.

=== Pomor fairy tales ===
The culture of neighboring peoples had a significant influence on the fairy tale (bylina) tradition of Pomorye. The most popular ones here are long fairy tales about adventures, in which the action is often connected with the sea. Usually, the main character of such tales is a poor man. Fairy tales with a female protagonist are no less common. They share all the trials equally with the men or turn out to be his wonderful assistant. Though, in a number of tales, girls are also innocent victims of a treacherous enemy.

The byliny served to preserve folk history with mythic layers, transmit values, warn against transgression, and connect listeners to ancestral memory. That was done by moral exemples but also by the invocation of spirit encounters. Apart from those fairy tales, Pomor spells, which have been compared to mantras, were also important in daily life and connected to traditional healing practices.

== Current situation ==
Nowadays the Pomors are a minority in Arkhangelsk Oblast, where most people are descendants of non-native Russians, but there is still a thriving cultural scene with international outreach. However, the Pomor villages are not protected by the state, which has taken the right to fish and hunt animals away from the Pomors, banned the traditional Pomor trade of Greenland seals, and expropriates their lands to then auction them to foreign investors, turning traditional houses to firewood and banning the people from entering their ancestral grounds. Russian laws target the indigenous population, and even if it is promised, the Pomors do not receive any compensation, which has led to the depopulation of vast areas that are now used for military purposes.

By 2012, 50% of all Pomor villages had been destroyed, dubbed a "genocide" by Pavel Esipov (Павел Есипов), the first leader of the Pomor national-cultural autonomy as registered by the Russian Ministry of Justice. Many Pomor villages can be reached only by helicopter and lack infrastructure, large parts of Pomorye are now used as garbage dumps. That led to the 2018–2020 Shies protests under the motto "Pomorye is not a trash heap", with more than 30,000 participants that successfully blocked the creation of a landfill at Shiyes station and led to the resignation of the governor of Arkhangelsk Oblast, Igor Orlov, and the governor of the Komi Republic, Sergei Gaplikov. The movement was influenced by Pomor separatists that seek an independent Pomorye or Biarmia.

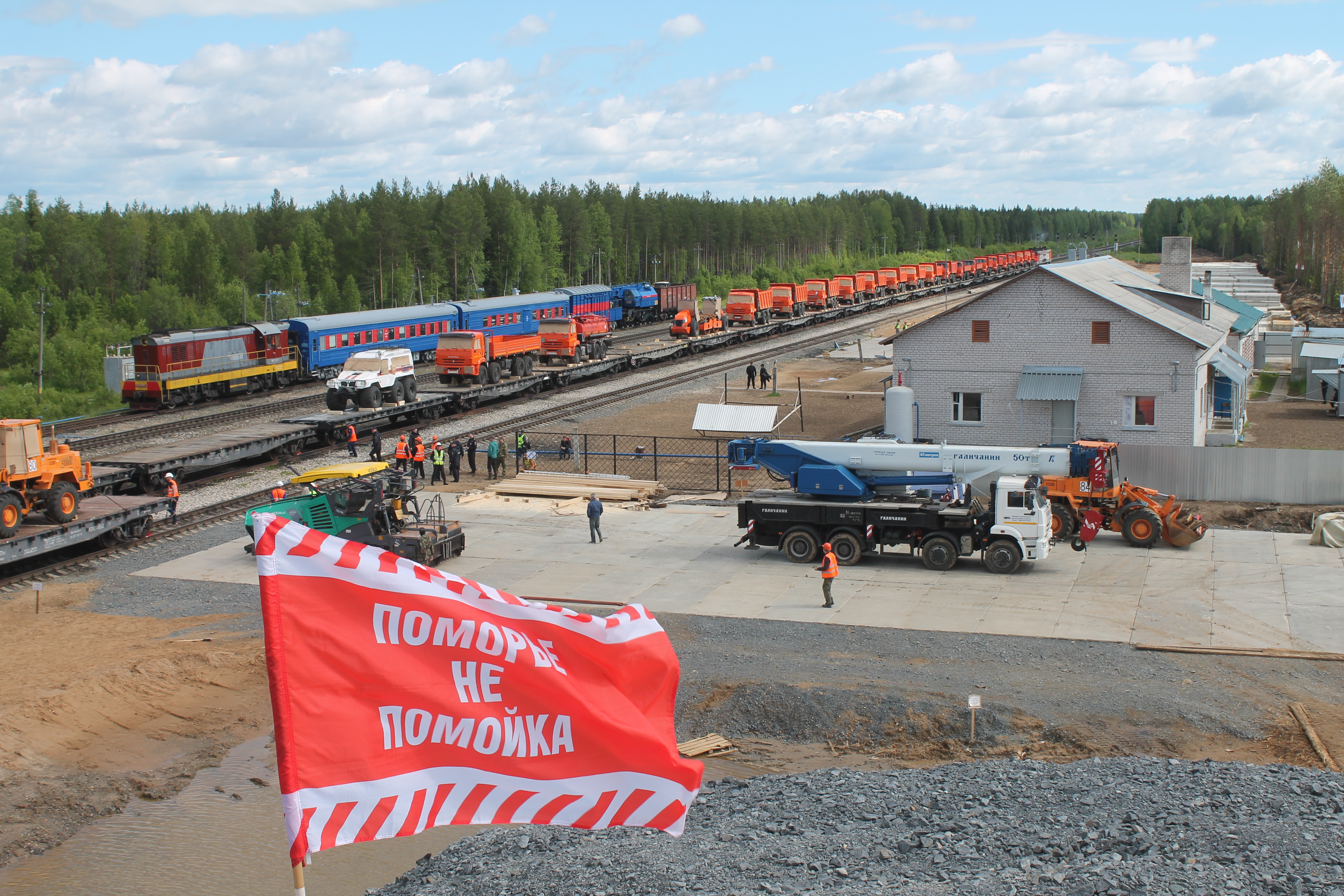
Flag saying: "Pomorye is not a garbage dump" during 2018–2020 Shies protests

One of the three universities of Arkhangelsk was named the Pomor State University (now merged into Northern (Arctic) Federal University).

In line with the trend in modern Russia towards amalgamating the least populated federal subjects into larger entities, a merger of Arkhangelsk and Murmansk Oblasts, the Komi Republic, and the Nenets Autonomous Okrug has been proposed, one of the possible names of this new territory being the Pomor Krai.

== Genetics ==
According to genetic studies, the Pomors are more closely related to the indigenous Uralic peoples of the region than to the population of Veliky Novgorod. Their population is very diverse, with the Pomors of Onega Coast, Winter Coast and Summer Coast being divided by a genetic distance comparable to the one between Eastern Slavs, Balts and Finno-Ugric peoples of the region. Within the Pomor cluster, the Onega Coast is especially close to Finnic-speaking ethnicities of Russia like Karelians or Veps people, the Summer Coast shows Scandinavian admixture due to medieval contact and the Winter Coast population is rather isolated with some affinities to specific populations of Finland and Sweden. None of them show close links to Novgorod populations, putting traditional Russian historiography into question. Along the coasts, Y-DNA haplogroups I1, R1a, and N3 each comprise about a quarter of the overall gene pool, with R1b and I2 at about 8% each, and inland Pomor populations are split around half-half between haplogroups N and R1a and generally very distant from the Onega Pomors of the three coasts.

The closest group to the coast dwellers are the Saami people with a genetic distance of 0.17, followed by Finns and Swedes with 0.28 each. The genetic distance to Novgorodians stands at 0.72–0.88, and the one to non-coastal Pomors in Pinezhsky (0.86) and Leshukonsky (0.97) districts, surprisingly, even higher. Pomors, like the Nenets and Saami, show a high frequency of the haplotype DRB104-DQA10301-DQB1*0302, which is not common in either Caucasians or East Asians, but in Amerindian populations, pointing to an ancient northern Eurasian gene pool. Pomors also share an Arctic component that is also present farther West in Norwegians and Finns, while being farther away from Muscovite Russians. Mezen Pomors are among the populations with the highest Ancient North Eurasian ancestry, alongside the Western Siberian Mansi people and Andeans, and additionally show smaller but significant East Siberian admixture, with about 15% neo-Siberian Nganasan-like ancestry among inland Pomors.

== Notable Pomors ==
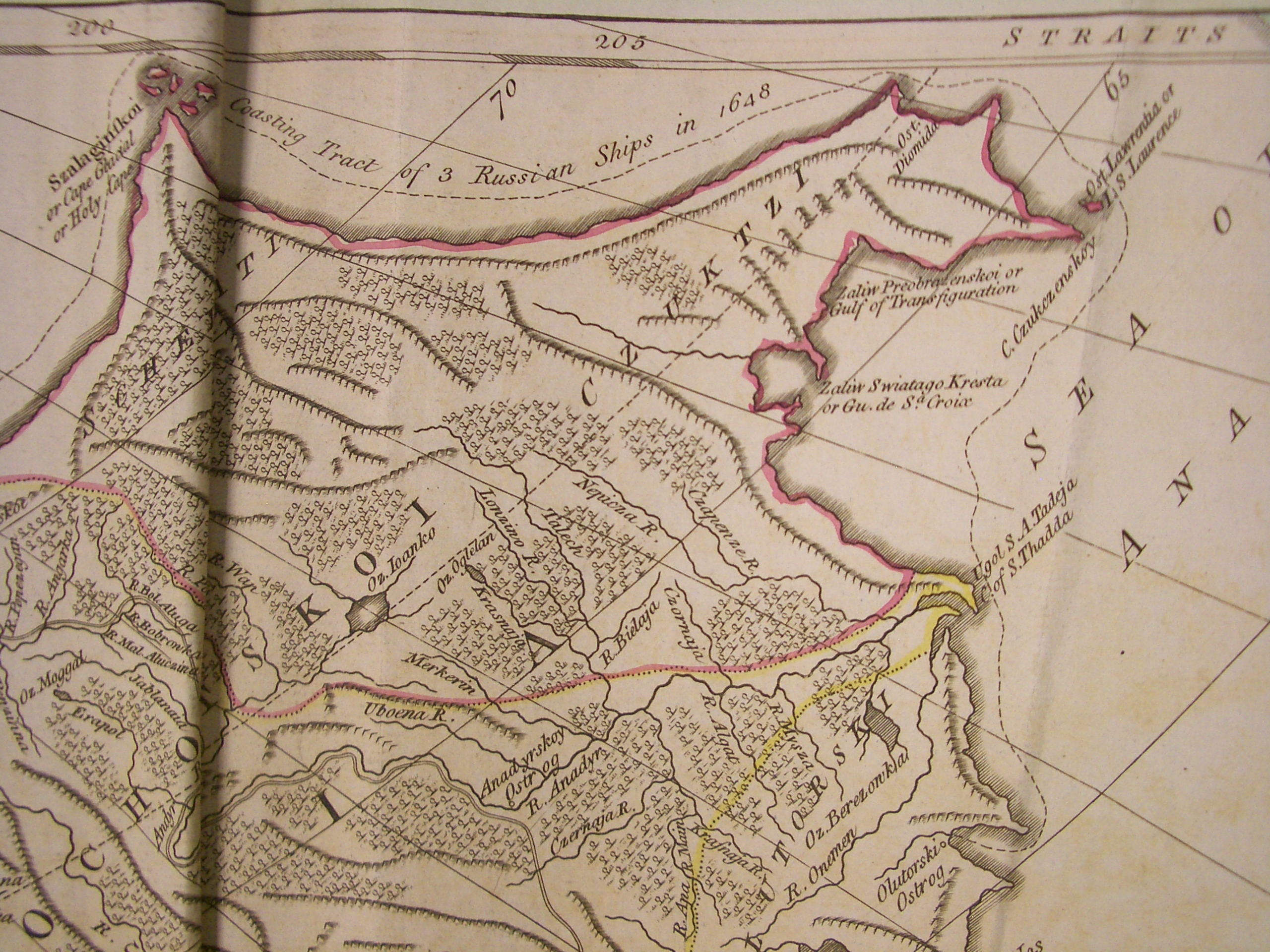
An early map (1773) of Chukotka, showing the route of the expedition of 1648, led by the Pomor Semyon Dezhnev.

- Semyon Dezhnev (1605–1673), explorer of Siberia;
- Mikhail Lomonosov (1711–1765), polymath, born near Kholmogory
- Fedot Shubin (1740–1805), sculptor, born near Kholmogory

== See also ==
- Russian North
- Pomor dialects
- Boris Shergin
- Laughter and Grief by the White Sea, a film celebrating the Pomors' culture.
- Pomor trade
- Barentsburg Pomor Museum

== Sources ==
- Nielsen, Jens Petter; Okhuizen, Edwin (2022). From Northeast Passage to Northern Sea Route: A History of the Waterway North of Eurasia. Brill. ISBN 978-90-04-38953-3.
