= Boris Shergin =

Boris Viktorovich Shergin (Russian: Бори́с Ви́кторович Ше́ргин; 28 July 1896, Arkhangelsk – 31 October 1973, Moscow) was a Russian and Soviet Pomor writer and folklorist.

== Biography ==
Shergin grew up in the Pomor culture in the family of a shipmaster. The life of the family was closely connected with the city of Arkhangelsk and the White Sea. His stories are written in the Pomor dialect.

From 1903 to 1912 Boris studied in Classical School of Archangelsk Province and after finishing it went to Moscow to study at the Stroganov's Artistic-Industrial High School.

His first stories were published in 1915. In 1916 on the initiative of A.A.Shakmatov the Academy of Sciences commissioned Boris Shergin to Shenkursky District of Arkhangelsk Province to research local dialects and collect folklore pieces.

In 1917 upon graduating from the Stroganov's School he returned to Arkhangelsk to work in the local Society for Studies of the Russian North and later in arts and crafts workshops. He made a major contribution into revival of northern handicrafts. Shergin was also interested in archaeography, collecting antique books, poetry albums, songbooks, old sailing directions, and skippers’ notebooks.

In 1922 Shergin moved back to Moscow to work for Children's Reading Institute under People's Comissariat for Education. The year 1924 saw the publication of his first book - U Arkhangelskogo goroda, u korabelnogo pristanisha with his own illustrations.

The beauty of the Russian north, with its proud people and rich culture, is reflected in his books.

After 1946 Akhmatova-Zoshchenko issue Shergin underwent persecutions as "spoiler of the Russian language".

Some of his stories were adapted into films, such as the animated films The Magic Ring (1979) and Laughter and Grief by the White Sea (1987).

== Books ==
Year	English	Russian
1924	In the City of Arkhangelsk, at the Docks	У Архангельского города, у корабельного пристанища
1936	Arkhangelsk Novellas	Архангельские новеллы
1939	By the Rivers of Song	У песенных рек
1959	Ocean - the Russian Sea	Океан - море русское
