= Stepan Pisakhov =

Stepan Grigoryevich Pisakhov (Russian: Степан Григорьевич Писахов; 13 October [O.S. 1 October] 1879 – 3 May 1960) was a Russian and Soviet artist, writer, oral storyteller, and ethnographer.

== Biography ==
Stepan Pisakhov was born in Arkhangelsk into a merchant family; at the same time his father was a craftsman – a jeweler and engraver. His mother came from a family of Old Believers. After completing his early schooling in Arkhangelsk, Pisakhov studied in the Baron Stieglitz’ Arts College in Petersburg. He continued his education as an artist in Paris and in a private Petersburg studio. Ilya Repin himself invited him to work in his studio. In 1899 Stepan Pisakhov participated in an art exhibition in Petersburg, and in 1907 his paintings were displayed in Rome, and in 1910 in his native Arkhangelsk; in 1912 he was awarded a silver medal at an art exhibition in Petersburg.

His grandmother’s brother, Grandpa Leontiy, was a professional folktale narrator, and from his early childhood the future writer lived amid the rich word-creation traditions of the Russian North. Stepan Pisakhov started composing and recounting his tales quite early, but rarely put them down on paper. The peculiarity of his texts, which were first and foremost intended for listening audiences, was conditioned by their spoken origin.

Only in 1924 were his tales from the Northern Munchausen cycle published in the collection On the Northern Dvina. In 1927 northern folktales recorded and commented upon by Stepan Pisakhov were published in the almanac “Sovetskaya Strana”. In 1938–1940 Pisakhov’s own tales (in two volumes) first saw the light in Arkhangelsk.

The geography of Pisakhov’s active creative scope stretched from Novaya Zemlya to Cairo. For an artist he had received myriad impressions from his travels as a young man in Italy, France, Turkey and Egypt. Yet his major focus, both as a writer and an artist, was his native North - its images, folklore and speech. Pisakhov explored the coastline of the White Sea, visited Novaya Zemlya, the waters of the Yugorsky Shar Strait that connects the Barents and Kara Seas, and took part in Arctic expeditions.

Most of his tales are set in the village of Uyma, a few kilometres upriver from Arkhangelsk. The protagonist and narrator of the tales, a Pomor peasant from Uyma, has the name of Semyon (Senya) Malina.

Pisakhov, along with Aleksandr Borisov and Tyko Vylka, is considered to be the founder of Russian Arctic painting, and initially his works were featured prominently in the Arkhangelsk Museum of Fine Arts. In 2008, the Stepan Pisakhov Museum was opened in Arkhangelsk, and his paintings were then transferred to this museum.
