= Kandel (surname) =

The surname Kandel has multiple distinct origins across European, Middle Eastern, and South Asian cultures.

It is mainly found in Jordan, Palestine, Egypt, and Lebanon as a variant of Kandil and Qandeel ,meaning "lamp" . Among Ashkenazi Jews, it indicates an ancestor from the town of Kandel in Rhineland-Palatinate, Germany. In Nepal, the surname is used by individuals from the Bhardwaj gotra (clan) of the Bahun and Chhetri castes and derives from the town of Kanda, Uttarakhand, India. Notable people with the surname include:

== In Europe and Americas ==
- David Kandel (1520–1592), artist
- Eric R. Kandel, neuroscientist
- Eugene Kandel, economist
- Felix Kandel, historian
- Harry Kandel, bandleader
- Isaac Leon Kandel, educator
- Jessica Kandel, surgeon
- Lenore Kandel, poet
- Michael Kandel, science fiction author
- Paul Kandel, actor
- Susan Kandel, art critic and writer
- Ellen Kandeler, biologist and agricultural scientist specializing in soil biology

== In Nepal ==
Kandel or Kadel (Nepali: कँडेल) is a surname of people belonging to Bahun and Chhetri castes in Nepal, belonging to Bhardwaj gotra. It is of Kumaoni origin from the town of Kanda, Uttarakhand, India. They are mostly founded in Dhading District and Baglung District of Nepal.

- Tanka Prasad Sharma Kadel, Nepalese politician
- Mani Bhadra Sharma Kandel, Nepalese politician and minister
- Yam Lal Kandel, Nepalese politician
- Devendra Raj Kandel, Nepalese politician
- Ghansyam Kandel, Nepalese writer, and Madan Puraskar winner
- Rajen Kandel, British-Nepalese Businessman, entrepreneur, Managing Director of Kandel Group UK, Co-founder of The British College
- Shubha Shankar Kandel, Chairman and Editor-in-Chief, ABC Television (Nepal)
