= Good Night, Little Ones! =

1964 Russian children's television programme

- From left to right: Stepashka, Filya, and Khryusha
- Russian: Спокойной ночи, малыши!
- Genre: Children's television
- Created by: Alexander Tatarsky, Arkady Khait
- Written by: Alexey Lebedev, Aleksandr Kurlyandsky, Felix Kamov, Arkady Khait, Alex Budovskiy, Denis Chervyachov, Vladimir Meerzon
- Screenplay by: Lithuania
- Story by: Sergey Kuligin
- Directed by: Denis Chernov, Vyacheslav Kotyonochkin
- Creative directors: Anatoliy Prokhorov, Fydor Ivanov
- Presented by: Anna Mikhalkova, Oxana Fedorova, Nikolai Valuev, Mikhail Porechenkov
- Theme music composer: Arkady Ostrovsky
- Ending theme: Tired toys are sleeping
- Original language: Russian
- No. of seasons: 61

Production
- Animators: Alexander Davydov, Alexander Goncharov, Roman Kozich, Sergey Kuligin, Anna Golovina, Galina Sorokina

Original release
- Network: Carousel
- Release: 1 September 1964 – present

Good Night, Little Ones! (Russian: Спокойной ночи, малыши!, romanized: Spokoynoy nochi, malyshi!) is a long-running Russian-language children's television program. Continuously broadcast since 1964 (premiered during the Soviet era), it airs as of 2016 on the Carousel channel.

The program's presenters have included Valentina Leontieva (in the 1960s and 1970s), Angelina Vovk, Tatyana Sudets and Tatyana Vedeneyeva (in the 1980s), Amayak Akopyan (in the 1996 and 2001). Current presenters (as of 2021) include Anna Mikhalkova (Nikita Mikhalkov's daughter), Oxana Fedorova, Nikolai Valuev and Mikhail Porechenkov.

== Format ==
The format has remained relatively constant over the decades. The presenter (a recognisable news reader, actor, or public figure) is joined on-set by one or two puppet characters. The most regularly appearing puppets are Khryusha (a piglet - introduced on February 10, 1970), Stepashka (a hare, introduced in 1970), Philya (a dog, introduced in 1968), Karkusha (a crow, introduced in 1982) and Mishutka (a bear, introduced in 2002). The presenter engages the puppets in a short conversation or helps them to perform a quick activity such as cleaning up the puppets' toys, or learning a moral.

After few minutes the presenter introduces a short cartoon. The cartoon lasts about five minutes. In early 2006, however, American Casper the Friendly Ghost cartoons were used on Fridays, and in 2007 and 2008, most nights featured an episode of Luntik, a cartoon produced by Melnitsa Animation Studio. If the cartoon is in another language it is dubbed into Russian, although the original language may still be audible.

After the cartoon the presenter and puppets return for a few seconds to say "Spokoinoi nochi, malyshi", or a variant thereof, and wave goodnight. The lullaby "Tired toys are sleeping" (Russian: «Спят усталые игрушки») opens and closes each segment, accompanied by elaborate clay animation. The lullaby itself was written by Arkady Ostrovsky and Zoya Petrova, while the animation was done by Aleksandr Tatarskiy in 1981.

In 1988, Fred Rogers had made a guest appearance on the show with Daniel Striped Tiger, as shown on Mister Rogers' Neighborhood, during the weekly theme, "Nighttime". Tatiana Vedeneyeva, who was the presenter at the time, appeared on Rogers' show later in the week and brought Stepashka with her. Khryusha and other Russian puppet characters appear on the 1988 TV special Free to Be... a Family where they met the Muppets Kermit the Frog, Miss Piggy and others. Khryusha and Stepashka would later make cameo appearances in the 1989 Disney special Mickey Goes to Moscow.

From September 11 to September 14, 2001, and from April 15 to May 30, 2014, the show wasn't aired.

The show celebrated its 50th anniversary on September 1, 2014. An anniversary concert was produced and screened on television.

In November 2018, Khryusha was the spokesperson for Russia at the 16th annual Junior Eurovision Song Contest in Minsk, Belarus along with a girl named Dina. Khryusha returned at the 2019 contest as the spokesperson.

== Awards ==
- Winner of the TEFI award (1997, 2002, 2003) in the nomination "Best Children's Program".
- Winner of the TEFI-Kids award (2022) - Oksana Fedorova as the host of a children's TV program.

== See also ==
- Tushite svet, a satirical TV program from the early 2000s featuring Khryusha and Stepashka grown to adulthood
