= Gennady Sokolsky =

Soviet animator and film director (1937–2014)

- Born: Gennady Mikhailovich Sokolsky; 1 December 1937; Moscow, USSR
- Died: 27 December 2014 (aged 77); Moscow, Russia
- Occupation(s): Animator, artist
- Years active: 1961-1998

Gennady Mikhailovich Sokolsky (Russian: Геннадий Михайлович Сокольский; 1 December 1937 — 27 December 2014) was a Soviet and Russian artist, animation director, animator, art director and screenwriter at Soyuzmultfilm. Sokolsky took part in over 170 projects, including the Happy Merry-Go-Round animated series which he co-created with several friends. Member of ASIFA.

== Biography ==
From 1959 to 1961 Sokolsky went through professional training at Soyuzmultfilm's animation courses, then finished the Moscow High School of Arts and Industry. In 1961 he was invited to join Fyodor Khitruk's group and took part in his first directorial effort — The Story of a Crime (1962). Sokolsky later worked on many other Khitruk's cartoons, including the much-acclaimed Winnie-the-Pooh trilogy, co-directing the third (and longest) chapter.

In 1969 he along with several friends produced the children's "newsreel" anthology Happy Merry-Go-Round which quickly turned into a launching pad for young directors and a polygon for experimental animation. Sokolsky himself directed a Well, Just You Wait! comedy short about an anthropomorphic wolf who tried to catch a small hare. It became so successful that same year it was turned into a popular series of its own, with a bigger budget and a new, more experienced director Vyacheslav Kotyonochkin attached.

Originally all segments were developed collectively. Sokolsky worked both as a director, art director and animator on various segments. After the team left the project, it turned into a more traditional animated series. They still continued working together on each other's cartoons. In 1974 Sokolsky, Anatoly Petrov and Valery Ugarov tried to start another anthology series aimed at schoolchildren, but it was rejected by Goskino and the pilot was reedited into a 10-minute short Prodelkin at School. In 1993 Sokolsky, Petrov, Galina Barinova and Leonid Nosyrev united for the last time to work on Jester Balakirev, a film based on the national folklore about Ivan Balakirev and Peter the Great.

As a director Sokolsky became famous for his comedy and environmental films. Among them was Silver Hoof (1977) based on Pavel Bazhov's fairy tale; Little Mouse Pik (1978), an adaptation of Vitaly Bianki's short story about a little mouse lost in the woods; Ivashka from the Pioneers Palace (1981), a comedy fairy tale written by Eduard Uspensky; and The Adventures of Lolo the Penguin (1986-1987) which Sokolsky co-directed with Kenji Yoshida. The latter became the first joined animated project by the USSR and Japan.

Sokolsky also directed a number of Fitil episodes, as well as animated sequences to several movies such as Sergei Gerasimov's The Love of Mankind (1972) and Alexander Mitta's How Czar Peter the Great Married Off His Moor (1976). An acclaimed composer Vladimir Martynov also regularly collaborated with the original Happy Merry-Go-Round team, introducing progressive electronic music to accompany animation. He wrote soundtracks to Sokolsky's Prodelkin at School, Silver Hoof and Little Mouse Pik.

During the 1990s Sokolsky switched to book illustration, mostly children's literature. From 1998 to 1999 he taught animation in Vilnius, Lithuania.

Gennady Sokolsky died on 27 December 2014 after a long illness. He was buried at the Pyatnitskoye Cemetery. He was survived by his wife Tatiana Georgievna Sokolskaya (born 1946), an art director and regular collaborator on her husband's films.

== Selected filmography ==
- The Story of a Crime (1962) – animator
- There Lived Kozyavin (1966) – animator
- Film, Film, Film (1968) – animator
- Happy Merry-Go-Round No. 1, 2, 5, 25, 26, 27, 28 (1969-1995) – director, art director, animator
- Winnie-the-Pooh (1969) – animator
- The Blue Bird (1970) - animator
- Umka is Looking for a Friend (1970) - animator
- Winnie-the-Pooh Pays a Visit (1971) – animator
- Fitil No. 112, 213, 233, 249 (1971-1983) – director
- Winnie-the-Pooh and a Busy Day (1972) – co-director, animator
- The Love of Mankind (1972) - director of animated sequences
- Prodelkin at School (1974) - director, animator
- Little Bird Tari (1976) - director
- How Czar Peter the Great Married Off His Moor (1976) - director of animated sequences
- Silver Hoof (1977) – director
- Little Mouse Pik (1978) - director, screenwriter
- Ivashka from the Pioneers Palace (1981) - director, screenwriter
- A Castle of Liars (1983) - director, screenwriter
- The Adventures of Lolo the Penguin (1986-1987) – director
- The Little Witch (1991) – director, screenwriter
- Well, Just You Wait! No. 17 (1993) – animator
- Jester Balakirev (1993) – animator
- Shakespeare: The Animated Tales (1994) - animator

== See also ==
- History of Russian animation
- Happy Merry-Go-Round

== Sources ==
- Gennady Sokolsky at IMDb
- Gennady Sokolsky at Animator.ru
- Books illustrated by Gennady Sokolsky at the Fantasy Laboratory
