= Leopold the Cat =

Soviet animated short film series

- Genre: Fairy tale, Comedy
- Written by: Arkady Khait
- Directed by: Anatoly Reznikov
- Starring: Andrey Mironov; Gennady Khazanov; Alexander Kalyagin
- Composer: Boris Saveliev
- Country of origin: Soviet Union
- No. of episodes: 11

Production
- Running time: 4–15 minutes
- Production company: Ekran

Original release
- Network: First Program of Central Television; Channel 1 Ostankino (cycle "The Return of Leopold the Cat")
- Release: 1975 – 1987

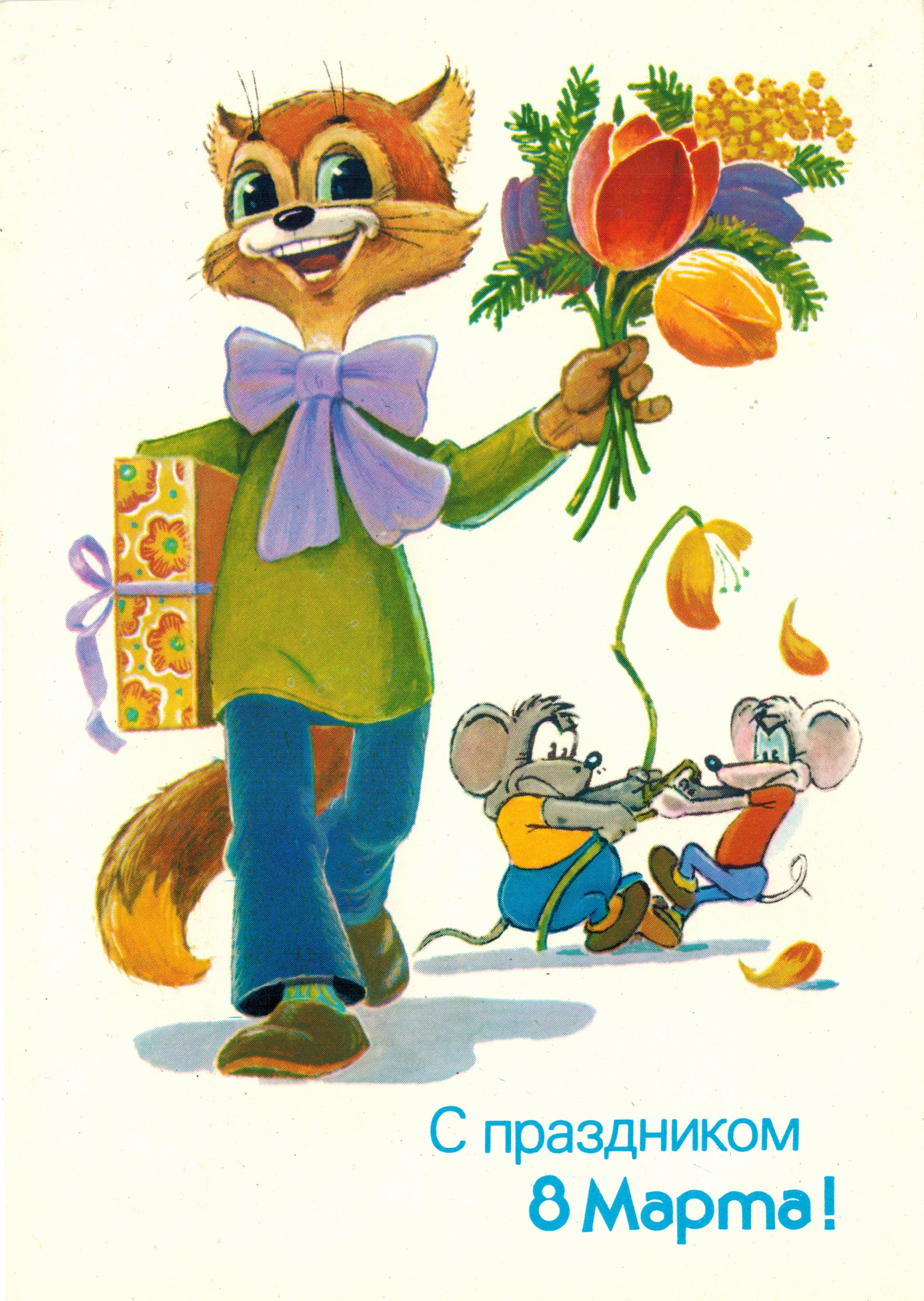
The main characters on the Soviet greeting card of 1988.

Leopold the Cat (Russian: Кот Леопольд, Kot Leopold) is a Soviet animated short film series about a good-natured and prudent cat, Leopold. Leopold always wears a bow tie even when swimming. Throughout the series, he has to deal with two mischievous mice, Grey and White (Mitya and Motya according to an early script version, but the cartoons themselves mention no names). The animation was produced at T/O Ekran in 1975–1987 and its runtime is 87 minutes (10 episodes). As of 1987, there were 11 episodes in total. In 1995, most of the episodes were released on tape.

It was directed by Anatoly Reznikov (Russian: Анатолий Резников), and the screenplay was written by Arkady Khait. Boris Savelyev wrote the music. The operators were by Ernst Gaman (1975, 1981), Igor Shkamarda (1982), and Vladimir Milovanov (1981, 1983, 1984, 1986). Nelli Kudrina was the sound engineer. The character's unusual name came from the antagonist of the movie The New Adventures of the Elusive Avengers named Colonel Leopold Sergeyevich Kudasov.

Leopold's catchphrase is "Guys, let's all get along" (Russian: Ребята, давайте жить дружно). The catchphrases of the two mice are "Come out, Leopold!" (Russian: Выходи, Леопольд!) by the one and "Come out, you foul coward!" (Russian: Выходи, подлый трус!) by the second. The first two episodes, "Revenge of Leopold the Cat" and "Leopold and the Goldfish", were created practically in 1981–1975 parallel, and with a help shifting technique: heroes and decorations were created on cut-out pieces of paper that were shifted under glass. The first two episodes premiered in 1981 and 1985 respectively. Further episodes were realized with the help of hand-drawn animation.

In the first episode, "Revenge of Leopold the Cat", all the roles were voiced by actor Andrey Mironov. He wanted to invite him for a second series ("Leopold and the Golden Fish"), but Mironov fell ill. As a result, all 4 characters were voiced by Gennady Khazanov. From the third ("Treasure of Cat Leopold") to the eleventh ("Car of Cat Leopold") episodes, all the roles were voiced by Alexander Kalyagin. (Excluding the 8th episode of "Interview with Cat Leopold", where Mironov's voice was heard again).

The series is very similar to Tom and Jerry, except unlike Tom and Jerry where the cat is usually the aggressor, in here the two mice are the aggressors.

== Characters ==
The main characters are Leopold the cat and the mice. Other characters also appear in some episodes. All characters are anthropomorphic animals that walk on their hind legs, wear clothes, and behave like humans.

=== Leopold the Cat ===
Leopold's image in the cartoon

A middle-aged ginger cat lives in house No. 8/16 on Murlykina Street, next to a cafe and a studio. He is depicted as a typical intellectual : he doesn't smoke, drink, or raise his voice. He is typically dressed in soft blue home trousers rolled up to the knee, a yellow turtleneck, house slippers, and his invariable bow tie, which he does not take off even when bathing.

Leopold is distinguished by his optimism, he is a real peacemaker cat, and his life credo is expressed by the phrase repeated at the end of each episode - "Guys, let's live in peace!" Starting from the third episode, he doesn't get angry at the mice, nor does he suffer from their pranks. From this episode on, he no longer takes revenge on the mice, and they end up being victims of their own traps.

=== Mice ===
Two mischievous mice. They appear in all episodes except Interview with Leopold the Cat. According to some sources, they were originally named Mitya and Motya, but, according to Arkady Khait, they are deliberately not pronounced in the cartoon - the authors did not want children with names that in a diminutive version could sound like Mitya and Motya, "to be teased as mice, toothy or rodents", so they are usually called according to their appearance - "Grey" and "White".

The Mice duo represent cunning and meanness, they are disgusted by the intelligent and kind Leopold. They usually call Leopold a "vile coward" and look for a way to spite him, but at the same time they themselves become victims of their own tricks and at the end of each episode they repent of their machinations.

In the first two episodes, their appearance does not express their qualities, they are both skinny and have squeaky voices, and the leadership among them changes: in the first episode, White clearly rules, in the second, Gray. Starting from the third episode, the obvious leader and brain center - the inventor of traps and nastiness for Leopold is the skinny and squeaky White, and the heavyset Gray with a bass voice becomes an obedient accomplice and executor of his plans. Sometimes Gray loses patience and gets out of control, for example, in the episode "Leopold the Cat's Clinic" White, trying to give Leopold a sleeping pill injection near the elevator, misses and, by inertia, sticks the syringe into Gray's body, after which he begins to chase him.

== Voice cast ==
- Andrei Mironov voiced the white mouse / the grey mouse / Cat Leopold / Doctor in episodes 1 and 8
- Gennady Khazanov voiced characters: Cat Leopold / Golden Fish / Grey mouse / White mouse in episode 2
- Alexander Kalyagin voiced all characters in episodes 3–7 and 9-11

== Episodes ==
№	Title	Summary	Year of release
1	«Leopold the Cat's Revenge» / «Месть кота Леопольда»	Leopold is listening to a record in his apartment while the mice are doing everything they can to get into his house, but to no avail. Then they lure Leopold outside and set a trap. Later, an exhausted Leopold calls a doctor, who tells him that the reason is very simple: «You’re too kind.» The doctor prescribes a medicine called «Ozverin», which makes Leopold turn evil and begin haunting down the mice.	January 26, 1975
2	«Leopold and the Goldfish» / «Леопольд и золотая рыбка»	Leopold caught a goldfish while fishing, but let it go without asking for anything in return. Later, the mice caught the fish and asked it to make them big and scary — but no matter what the fish turned them into, they only found problems. Then they ask the fish to turn them back into mice and end up near Leopold’s house. When they break into the cat’s home, Leopold asks the goldfish to make him invisible. The mice look for the cat and cause a mess in his house — then Leopold, taking advantage of his invisibility, teaches the mice a lesson.	September 14, 1975
3	Leopold the Cat's Treasure / «Клад кота Леопольда»	The mice received a map in the mail, which marked the location of the treasure. The chest is indeed buried at the location indicated on the map, but it instead of cheese it contained Leopold dressed as a ghost.	March 29, 1981
4	«Leopold the Cat's TV» / «Телевизор кота Леопольда»	Leopold bought a TV, and the mice are doing everything they can to prevent him from calmly watching his favorite cartoon (the first episode about himself). The mice decide to hook up a vacuum cleaner, which gets out of control. The vacuum cleaner sucks up Leopold’s slippers, and he tries to turn it off, but he gets caught in the stream of air and flies up to the ceiling.	August 30, 1981
5	«Leopold the Cat's Stroll» / «Прогулка кота Леопольда»	Leopold is taking a bike ride along a country road. The mice are doing everything they can to set him up for an accident, but they end up falling into their own trap.	March 14, 1982
6	«Leopold the Cat's Birthday» / «День рождения Леопольда»	Leopold is getting ready to celebrate his birthday, while the mice are trying to ruin his celebration: in particular, they significantly increase the heat in the oven, which causes Leopold’s birthday cake to burn.	September 26, 1982
7	«Leopold the Cat's Summer» / «Лето кота Леопольда»	Leopold goes to the dacha, where the mice are plotting new mischief against him. They invent an entire mechanical system, hoping that Leopold will take a bottle of milk, and as a result of the system’s operation, he will get hit on the head by a falling watermelon. The system works perfectly when the mice test it themselves — but when the mice try to use it as intended, Leopold, noticing a hanging watermelon, picks it up — the system works «in reverse» and the mice themselves become victims of their own invention.	June 11, 1983
8	«An Interview with Leopold the Cat» / «Интервью с котом Леопольдом»	Leopold gives an interview to Dal Orlov (chroma key for «Blue Light», Russian annual New Year's show)	December 30, 1984
9	«Leopold the Cat In Dream and Reality» / «Кот Леопольд во сне и наяву»	Leopold is sunbathing and reading the book about Robinson Crusoe while the mice are trying to scare him. When he falls asleep on the beach, he dreams that he has ended up on a deserted island.	January 14, 1984
10	«Leopold the Cat's Clinic» / «Поликлиника кота Леопольда»	Leopold has a toothache, and he goes to the clinic to see a dentist, and then to a medical examination. Meanwhile, the mice are trying to pull another prank on him.	September 21, 1986
11	«Leopold the Cat's Car» / «Автомобиль кота Леопольда»	Leopold built a car himself, equipped with many electronic devices. When he went out of town for a painting session, the mice stole the car but couldn’t figure out all its functions.	September 13, 1987

== See also ==
- Leopold Mozart, the most common cultural reference in history for Russians
- Nu Pogodi
- Oggy and the Cockroaches, a French cartoon about Oggy, an anthropomorphic cat, that is continually pestered by three roaches named Joey, Marky and Dee Dee.
