= Hare and Wolf =

- Also known as: Thỏ và Sói
- Genre: Comedy; Adventure; Thriller
- Created by: Vũ Kim Dũng
- Written by: Đinh Tiếp
- Directed by: Đặng Nhân Lập
- Composers: Trọng Đài; Vũ Nhật Tân; Doãn Nho; Doãn Nguyên
- Country of origin: Vietnam
- Original languages: Vietnamese; English
- No. of episodes: 4 (list of episodes)

Production
- Producers: Thanh Ngọc; Kim Ngọc; Hồ Bạch Ngọc
- Cinematography: Lê Khôi
- Running time: 10 minute-long episodes approx.
- Production company: Vietnam Animation Studio

Original release
- Network: Vietnam Television
- Release: 1992 – 2001

Hare and Wolf (Vietnamese: Thỏ và Sói) is a 1990s Vietnamese series of animated short films directed by M.A. Đặng Nhân Lập.

== History ==
Film based on Soviet series Well, Just You Wait! and some Southeast Asian folktales.

=== Plot ===
Hare and Wolf lives in the same village. So the series follows the comical adventures of Wolf, trying to catch - and presumably eat or even sell to China - Hare. It features additional characters that usually either help the hare or interfere with the Wolf's plans.

- Episode 01 (1992) : The head and the tails (Cái đầu cái đuôi)
- Episode 02 (1994) : The ears and the eyes (Cái tai cái mắt)
- Episode 03 (1995) : Travelling a day... (Đi một ngày đàng...)
- Episode 04 (2000) : Not to care a fig (Coi trời bằng vung)

=== Characters ===
- The Hare, commonly called as Hare the Younger (Vietnamese: Thằng Thỏ), is portrayed as a supposedly positive hero. He is less developed than the Wolf, and most of his actions are simply reactions to the Wolf's schemes. In later episodes, the role of the Hare becomes more active and developed, and he even manages to save the Wolf on several occasions. So the Hare is often mistaken as a female due to his appearance and voice; however, it seems the Hare is genderless. He is almost always seen wearing the same yellow T-shirt and dark blue shorts unlike the Wolf's ever-varying wardrobe.
- The Wolf, commonly called as Wolf the Older (Vietnamese: Lão Sói), is initially portrayed as a hooligan who eagerly turns to vandalism, abuses minors, breaks laws, and is a smoker (nicotiana rustica) or sometimes drunkard. But he is absolutely henpecked husband.
- The Crow, commonly called as Crow the Fellow (Vietnamese: Tên Quạ), is portrayed as a supposedly clown and even philosopher. He always perch on the tree branch to observe and conclude Wolf's behaviors.

Besides as Wolf's wife, Bear the Blacksmith, Fox the Playboy, Chin the Mistress, Cock the Innkeeper and Pup the Police.

== Production ==
- Assistant : Bùi Quỳnh
- Artist : Lý Thu Hà, Lập Thu
- Animators : Lan Phương, Thanh Việt, Tường Long, Nguyễn Thị Măng, Phùng Văn Hà, Ngô Ngọc Long, Hoàng Linh, Doãn Thùy, Thanh Huyền, Minh Nguyệt
- Decorating : Thu Lý, Hồng Sơn, Bình Minh
- Sound : Tạ Quốc Khánh, Mạnh Kiên, Trần Toàn
- Montager : Kim Oanh, Viết Phú
- Actors : Phú Đôn (Wolf), Thùy Dương (Hare), Hương Dung (Wolf's wife), Hoàng Đức Thắng (Crow), Trung Hiếu (Fox & Pup the Police)
- Theme : Going to Perfume Pagoda (Em đi chùa Hương) composed by Trung Đức with Hare's singing, Why you in a hurry to get married (Sao em nỡ vội lấy chồng) composed by Trần Hiếu with Wolf's
- Color printing by National Studio for Documentary and Scientific Films

== Culture ==
Episode 2 was produced by Ministry of Culture and Information's order to encourage a two-child policy.

== See also ==
- Hare and Turtle
- Lu and Bun
- Well, Just You Wait!
- Tom and Jerry
