= The Return of the Prodigal Parrot =

Russian animated series

- Also known as: Возвращение блудного попугая
- Created by: Aleksandr Kurlyandsky; Valentin Karavaev
- Directed by: Valentin Karavaev; Alexander Davydov
- Voices of: Gennady Khazanov; Igor Khristenko; Margarita Korabelnikova; Natalia Chenchik; Klara Rumyanova
- Country of origin: Soviet Union (episodes 1–3); Russia (episodes 4–6)
- Original language: Russian
- No. of episodes: 6

Production
- Running time: 9–26 minute-long episodes approx.
- Production company: Soyuzmultfilm

Original release
- Release: 1984 – 2006

The Return of the Prodigal Parrot (Note: "Prodigal parrot" is a pun with "prodigal son") (Russian: Возвращение блудного попугая, romanized: Vozvrashchenie bludnogo popugaya) is a Soviet, later Russian, series of animated short films produced by Soyuzmultfilm.

== Plot ==
The main character is the parrot Kesha. He lives in the apartment of a student named Vovka. Due to his short-tempered and arrogant nature, Kesha periodically flies away and gets into trouble. But eventually he always returns to Vovka. The humor of the series is based on Kesha's eccentric behavior.

== Cast ==
- Gennady Khazanov as parrot Kesha (episodes 1–3)
- Igor Khristenko as parrot Kesha (episodes 4–6)
- Margarita Korabelnikova as Vovka (episodes 1, 3) / crow Clara (episode 3)
- Natalia Chenchik as Vovka / crow Clara (episode 2)
- Olga Shorokhova as Vovka (episodes 4–6)
- Zinaida Naryshkina as crow Clara (episode 1)
- Klara Rumyanova as crow Clara (episode 4)
- Eduard Nazarov as cat Vasily (episode 1)
- Vyacheslav Nevinny as cat Vasily (episode 2)
- Valentin Karavaev as cat Vasily (episode 3)
- Anatoly Vologdin as cat Vasily (episode 5)
- Dmitry Novikov as cat Vasily (episode 6)

== Episodes ==
- The Return of the Prodigal Parrot (episode 1) – 1984
- The Return of the Prodigal Parrot (episode 2) – 1987
- The Return of the Prodigal Parrot (episode 3) – 1988
- Kesha Parrot's Morning (episode 4) – 2002
- The new adventures of Kesha the parrot (episode 5) – 2005
- Parrot Kesha and the Monster (episode 6) – 2006

== Trivia ==
- Episodes 1-3 were released in 1984–1988. The economic crisis of the 1990s in Russia delayed the release of the fourth episode for a long time, although the script was written. The animated series was only able to continue in the early 2000s.
- Child psychologists use the plot of the cartoon to solve conflict situations with teenagers.

== Award ==
- Nika Award for the best Animated Film of 1987.

== See also ==
- History of Russian animation
