= Anatoly Petrov (animator) =

Russian animator and director (1937–2010)

- Born: Anatoly Alexeyevich Petrov; 15 September 1937; Moscow, USSR
- Died: 3 March 2010 (aged 72); Moscow, Russia
- Occupations: Animator, artist, educator

Anatoly Alexeyevich Petrov (Russian: Анатолий Алексеевич Петров; 15 September 1937 – 3 March 2010) was a Soviet and Russian animation director, animator, artist and educator at VGIK known as the founder of the long-running anthology series Happy Merry-Go-Round and developer of the animation technique he called photographics (also known as graphical painting). A member of ASIFA, he was named Meritorious Artist of the RSFSR in 1989.

== Start of career ==
Petrov was born in Moscow. At the age of twelve he came into possession of a photographic plates folding camera, became engaged in photography and organized a home darkroom. From 1954 to 1956 he studied at the art school, and from 1956 to 1959 — at the animation courses under Soyuzmultfilm led by Fyodor Khitruk where he met his future wife and regular collaborator Galina Barinova. While still a student he was distinguished for his artistic skills and the ability to work in various styles. Upon graduation Petrov and Barinova joined Soyuzmultfilm, simultaneously studying at the Moscow Polygraphic Institute (1959—1964).

Very soon Petrov was noticed by the leading directors and became one of the most wanted animators at the studio. In just several years Lev Atamanov, when asked whether he would hire Fyodor Khitruk or Petrov, answered "Petrov, because he is a universal artist who is capable of everything". By the mid-1960s he was already teaching his own students; he developed a unique programme and spent over 40 years as an educator, both at Soyuzmultfilm and VGIK animation courses.

Around the same time he was sent to Zagreb Film (Yugoslavia) for retraining as an animation director. Upon return in 1967 Petrov directed his first experimental short Hippopotamus (also known as The Singing Teacher) which was released as part of the Kaleidoscope-68 almanac in 1968. Drawn with pencil, it featured detailed three-dimensional characters with lifelike movements in an absurdist tale. From then on he started promoting his original ideas, always working as animator on his films.

Petrov studied world art and dreamed of bringing world-famous paintings to life. He developed a theory of the unity of visual arts and the art of animation. According to him, every famous artist required a new unique approach that would lead to stylistically different movements. That's where the idea for his next project came.

== As a director ==
In 1969 Petrov and Barinova gathered a team of young animators who hadn't been given a chance to direct their own films before and created the Happy Merry-Go-Round "newsreel" animated anthology. It was conceived as a polygon for experimental animation based on riddles, rhymes, songs, absurd stories and so on. The original team included Gennady Sokolsky, Leonid Nosyrev and Valery Ugarov who later made successful individual careers, but also regularly helped each other. The first episode Distracted Giovanni was directed by Petrov himself. Based on the fairy tale by Gianni Rodari about a distracted boy who literally fell apart, it was accused by the head of the State Committee for Cinematography Alexei Romanov for "using children's cinema as a polygon for abstract art propaganda". Nevertheless, the project turned very successful, becoming one of the few Soviet animated series that survived the dissolution of the Soviet Union and making it to the 21st century.

With the 1975 And Mother Will Forgive Me Petrov went on to implement the animation style he called photographics influenced by hyperrealism. The film won a prize at the 7th Tampere Film Festival in 1977. His next science fiction film Polygon (1977) was two years in production. All characters were drawn and animated after famous Western movie actors such as Jean Gabin, Paul Newman and Mel Ferrer, and the visual effect created through the use of multilayered celluloid, moving virtual camera, the use of light and color came close to the modern-day CGI. The film received Grand Prize at the 11th Yerevan Film Festival in 1978.

Petrov was sure that realism could be achieved by traditional methods of animation, without any additional tricks such as filming, photography and technical devices. He despised rotoscoping and always distanced from it. He managed to achieve his old dream — the moving paintings — through the use of the so-called effect of moving glaze in 3D environment. At the same time, he got interested in Greek mythology and became obsessed with another idea: bringing Greek statues to life.

This resulted in five films released from 1986 to 1996. The first of them, Heracles at Admetus (1986), was based on one of the Heracles adventures. It took him four years to finish, and it is considered to be the pick of his craftsmanship by modern film historians. As the film historian Georgy Borodin wrote, "for many years film directors who had been working in 3D computer graphics and who owned technical resources incomparable to those of Petrov's couldn't even come close to the screen life of three-dimensional hand-drawn characters created by Petrov using only his golden hands". Because it took him so long to finish the cartoon, he wasn't allowed to direct another film for the next several years. His later films featured nudity and were released as adult-themed.

== Last years ==
After the last film Petrov focused on teaching and illustration. He also prepared a three-volume tutorial on animation which was published posthumously.

Petrov died on 3 March 2010 in Moscow after a long illness. He was survived by his wife Galina Barinova (born 1939) and their daughter Galina Petrova (1960–2016), also an artist and animator.

== Selected filmography ==
- Peter and the Little Red Riding Hood (1958) — animator
- Animated Crocodile № 3 (1960) — animator
- The Key (1961) — animator
- The Story of a Crime (1962) — animator
- Vovka in a Far Away Kingdom (1965) — animator
- Boniface's Holidays (1965) — animator
- There Lived Kozyavin (1966) — animator
- Kaleidoscope-68 (1968) — director, art director, animator
- Glass Harmonica (1968) — animator
- Happy Merry-Go-Round № 1-11 (1969-1980) — creator, director, art director, animator, screenwriter
- The Bremen Town Musicians (1969) — animator
- Karlson Returns (1970) — animator
- Ave Maria (1972) — animator
- Ratibor's Childhood (1973) — animator
- Prodelkin in School (1974) — director, animator
- And Mother Will Forgive Me (1975) — director, animator
- Mayakovsky Laughs (1975) — director of animated segments
- Polygon (1977) — director, animator
- At the Back-row Desk (1978-1985) — screenwriter
- Caliph Stork (1981) — screenwriter
- The Castle of Liars (1983) — screenwriter
- Heracles at Admetus (1986) — director, art director, screenwriter
- The Birth of Eros (1989) — director, art director, animator, screenwriter
- Daphne (1990) — director, art director, animator, screenwriter
- Salmaka the Nymph (1992) — director, screenwriter
- Jester Balakirev (1993) — screenwriter
- Polyphemus, Akid and Galatea (1996) — director, animator, screenwriter

== Bibliography ==
- Anatoly Petrov (2010). Classic Animation. Drawn movement. — Moscow: VGIK, 197 pages ISBN 978-5-87149-121-8

== See also ==
- History of Russian animation
- Happy Merry-Go-Round
