= Happy Merry-Go-Round =

- Genre: Animated cartoon Anthology series
- Created by: Anatoly Petrov; Galina Barinova
- Starring: Various voice actors
- Composer: Various
- Countries of origin: Soviet Union; Russia
- Original language: Russian
- No. of episodes: 33 (91 segments) (original); 15 (56 segments) (revival)

Production
- Running time: 8–14 minutes
- Production company: Soyuzmultfilm

Original release
- Release: 1969 – 2001

Happy Merry-Go-Round (Russian: Весёлая карусель, romanized: Vesyolaya karusel') is a long-running Soviet and Russian animated anthology series created by Anatoly Petrov and Galina Barinova for Soyuzmultfilm in 1969. It is presented as a collection of 2–4 experimental shorts by various young directors. The original series ran from 1969 to 2001 and was released theatrically during the Soviet days and on television in the Russian Federation. 2012 saw the revival of the series.

== History ==
The idea of the animated "newsreel" anthology (or a "children's animated magazine" as it was known in the Soviet Union) came to Anatoly Petrov and his wife Galina Barinova, both experienced animators at Soyuzmultfilm who hadn't been given a chance to direct their own films before. It was conceived as a proving ground for experimental animation by beginning directors based on riddles, rhymes, songs, absurd stories and so on.

The series aired in 1969 as a collection of four short traditionally animated cartoons by a team of newcomers, originally under the "artistic guidance" by Roman Kachanov. The first episode included Distracted Giovanni by Petrov, a hand-drawn story with a cutout look about a distracted boy who literally fell apart; Mosaic directed by Galina Barinova and Leonid Nosyrev that utilized a mosaic aesthetics; Antoshka, a musical comedy also by Nosyrev, and Well, Just You Wait! by Gennady Sokolsky which was soon turned into a popular series of its own.

Despite heavy criticism from the head of Goskino for "using children's cinema as a proving ground for abstract art", the anthology got a lot of praise on its release, and the team continued the production, attracting new people. Among those who made their directional debut in Happy Merry-Go-Round were Eduard Nazarov, Valery Ugarov, Garri Bardin, Aleksandr Davydov and others. They were given a lot of artistic freedom which allowed many of them to develop distinctive styles before departing to their own projects.

The first ten episodes were released theatrically from 1969 to 1978 on a yearly bases. Each episode was 9 months in production. While not directly connected, the segments still tried to follow a basic "comics" pattern and were developed collectively. After 1978 the original team left the project and it turned into a more traditional collection of cartoons, with each segment being developed independently from the rest. Episodes started appearing randomly: sometimes 2-3 per year, sometimes with a 1-2 year interval. Several stop motion shorts were introduced during the 1980s.

It was one of the few Soyuzmultfilm's projects that survived the dissolution of the Soviet Union and the following crisis, switching to the television format. The original series ran for 33 seasons up until 2001 when the production was stopped. In 2012 the series was revived. New directors and new types of animation were introduced, such as claymation, 2D and 3D computer animation.

== List of episodes ==
No.	Segment	Original Title	Creator	Synopsis
1 (1969)	Mosaic	Мозайка	Galina Barinova, Leonid Nosyrev	Mosaic animals transform and chase each other.
1 (1969)	Antoshka	Антошка	Leonid Nosyrev	A song about a lazy boy Antoshka who refuses to dig potatoes.
1 (1969)	Absent-minded Giovanni	Рассеянный Джованни	Anatoly Petrov	An absent-minded Italian boy is losing his body parts. A short story by Gianni Rodari.
1 (1969)	Well, Just You Wait!	Ну, погоди!	Gennady Sokolsky	Three mini-stories about a hooligan wolf trying to eat a hare.
2 (1970)	Tall Tales	Небылицы	Rasa Strautmane	A tale about a tall short man and his flying, blue-as-a-carrot crocodile that makes no sense.
2 (1970)	The Very First	Самый первый	Anatoly Petrov	Forest adventures of a lazy pioneer who hid in a backpack.
2 (1970)	Two Merry Geese	Два весёлых гуся	Leonid Nosyrev	Based on a folklore song about two merry geese.
3 (1971)	A Mess	Разгром	Valery Ugarov	Mother is guessing what happened to the flat during her absence.
3 (1971)	Blue Meteorite	Голубой метеорит	Anatoly Petrov	Somewhere in space flies a blue meteorite...
3 (1971)	Red, Red, Freckled	Рыжий, рыжий, конопатый	Leonid Nosyrev	Another teasing song about Antoshka who "killed his grandpa with a shovel".
4 (1972)	About an Oddball Froglet	Про чудака лягушонка	Valery Ugarov	What if a froglet was a cow?
4 (1972)	A Silent Hamster	Хомяк-молчун	Leonid Nosyrev	A rude hamster with fat cheeks doesn't greet anyone.
4 (1972)	A Merry Oldman	Весёлый старичок	Anatoly Petrov	A merry dwarf who always laughs. A poem by Daniil Kharms.
5 (1973)	Isn't This Film About You?	Не про тебя ли этот фильм?	Valery Ugarov	About a really messy and absent-minded girl.
5 (1973)	Who Grazes in a Field?	Кто пасётся на лугу?	Galina Barinova	Someone who starts with a "co...". A riddle song.
5 (1973)	Wonder	Чудо	Anatoly Petrov	In a futuristic city there is only one wonder left...
5 (1973)	Tall Tales in Faces	Небылицы в лицах	Gennady Sokolsky	Yegor mocks stupid Nikodim. Based on Russian nursery rhymes.
6 (1974)	Healing of Vasily	Лечение Василия	Vladimir Morozov	A giant didn't take a bath for 100 years, and now it hurts.
6 (1974)	Confusion	Путаница	Galina Barinova	Animals have suddenly gone mad. A poem by Korney Chukovsky.
7 (1975)	Silly Horse	Глупая лошадь	Galina Barinova	A silly horse doesn't know when to put on galoshes.
7 (1975)	Little Hippo	Бегемотик	Eduard Nazarov	A little hippopotamus is very lonely and can't find a friend.
8 (1976)	What's with the Lion's Large Mane?	Почему у льва большая грива?	Natalia Bogomolova, Olga Orlova	Once upon a time, a barber tried to cut lion's hair.
8 (1976)	Orange	Апельсин	Galina Barinova	A counting-out game: how to divide an orange between friends.
8 (1976)	A Tincan	Консервная банка	Garri Bardin	A cruel boy ties a tincan to a kitten and gets his revenge.
9 (1977)	For a Fillip	За щелчок	Leonid Kayukov	A bully hare offers a carrot in exchange for a fillip.
9 (1977)	Clown	Клоун	Leonid Kayukov	A circus clown shows what he is capable of.
9 (1977)	A Princess and a Cannibal	Принцесса и людоед	Eduard Nazarov	Two versions of how a princess met a cannibal in the woods.
10 (1978)	Parcel	Посылка	Galina Barinova	About a hungry rat Anfisa who received a tasty parcel.
10 (1978)	A Firefly	Светлячок	Anatoly Petrov	Adventures of a lonely firefly at the bottom of the sea.
10 (1978)	A Butterfly and a Tiger	Бабочка и тигр	Valery Ugarov	A striped mattress wants to be a tiger and scares everyone.

== See also ==
- History of Russian animation
