= Eugene Kandel =

Israeli economist

- יוג'ין קנדל
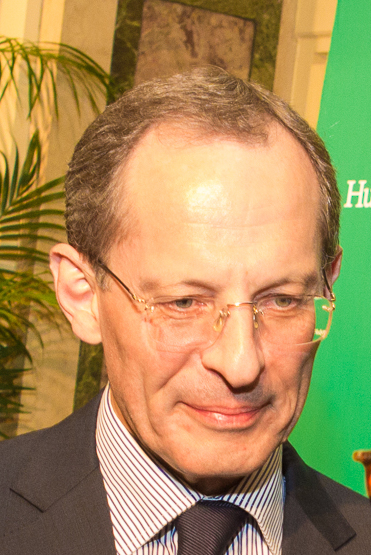

Academic background
- Education: University of Chicago (PhD, 1990); Hebrew University of Jerusalem (MA, 1988) University of Chicago (MBA, 1987); Hebrew University of Jerusalem (BA, 1981)

Academic work
- Discipline: Economics
- Institutions: Hebrew University of Jerusalem

Eugene [Yevgeny] Kandel (Hebrew: יוג'ין קנדל; born 1959, in Moscow) is an Israeli economist, Emil Spyer Professor (Emeritus) of Economics and Finance at the Hebrew University of Jerusalem, and the chairman of the Board of the Tel Aviv Stock Exchange. Formerly, the CEO of the Start-Up Nation Central, and the Head of the National Economic Council and the Economic Advisor to the Prime Minister of Israel.

== Biography ==
Eugene Kandel is the older of two sons of Felix Kandel, an author of over 30 books, and one of the authors of the Soviet-era animated series Nu, pogodi!. Kandel holds a BA and an MA from the Hebrew University, and an MBA and a PhD from the Graduate School of Business at the University of Chicago.

== Academic and civic career ==
From 1989 to 1997 Kandel was a professor of economics at the William Simon Graduate School of Business at the University of Rochester. Between 1997 and 2024 he was a professor of Economics and Finance at the Hebrew University of Jerusalem. Kandel is a member of the Center for the Study of Rationality at the Hebrew University, a research fellow of the Centre for Economic Policy Research in London, and a Fellow of the European Corporate Governance Institute. He is the founder of the Center for Financial Markets and Institutions, and established the MA program in Finance and Financial Economics at the Hebrew University.

Kandel was involved in the 1997 redesign of the Nasdaq trading rules. He was editor and associate editor of academic finance journals, and was a chairman of investment committees for pension and provident funds in Israel.

In 2009 he was appointed as the Chairman of Israel's National Economic Council and the Economic Advisor to the Prime Minister Benjamin Netanyahu and worked for six years till 2015. He played a central role in all major decisions on economic policy during that time, chaired and participated in major committees.

Between 2015-21, Kandel was the CEO of Start-Up Nation Central, a non-profit organization that links the world's challenges to Israeli technological innovations that can help address them. In April 2021, he became co-chairman of the Start-Up Nation Policy Institute (SNPI), a non-profit independent think tank, specializing in innovation policy and the Israeli innovation model.

In July 2023, Kandel was appointed chairman of the Tel Aviv Stock Exchange.

== Selected published works ==
- A. Hamdani, N. Hashai, Kandel, E. and Y. Yafeh, Technological Progress and the Future of the Corporation, Journal of British Academy, 2018.
- Kandel, E., K. Kosenko, R. Morck, and Y. Yaffe, The Great Pyramids of America: A Revised History of US Business Groups, Corporate Ownership and Regulation, 1926-1950, Strategic Management Journal, 2018.
- A. Hamdani, Kandel E., Y. Mugerman and Y. Yaffe, Incentive Fees and Competition in Pension Funds: Evidence from a Regulatory Experiment, Journal of Law, Finance, and Accounting, 2017.
- D. Hunter, Kandel, E., S. Kandel, and R. Wermers, Mutual Fund Performance Evaluation with Active Peer Benchmarks, lead article, Journal of Financial Economics, 2014.
- T. Foucault and O. Kadan, Kandel, E., Liquidity Cycle and Make/Take Fees in Electronic Markets. 2009 Analysis Group Award for the best paper on Financial Institution and Markets at the Western Finance Association Meetings; The Journal of Finance, 2013
- Kandel, E., M. Massa, and A. Simonov, Shareholder Similarity and Firm Value, The Journal of Financial Economics, 2011.
- L. Bosetti, Kandel, E. and B. Rindi, Closing Auction, The Journal of Financial Intermediation, 2011.
- I. Guttman, and O. Kadan, Kandel, E. Theory of Dividend Smoothing, The Review of Financial Studies, 2011.
- Kandel, E., D. Leschinskii and H. Yuklea Aging Brings Myopia: VC Fund’s Limited Horizon as a Source of Inefficiency, the Journal of Financial and Quantitative Analyses, 2011.
- Benmelech, E., Kandel, E. and P. Veronesi. Stock-Based Compensation and CEO (Dis)Incentives, The Quarterly Journal of Economics, 2010.
- Kandel, E. (2009), In Search of Reasonable Executive Compensation, CESIfo Economic Studies 55(3–4), 405–433.
- Goldstein, M., Irvine, P., Kandel, E., & Wiener, Z. (2009), Brokerage Commissions and Institutional Trades, Financial Studies 22 (12): 5175–5212.
- Bondaryuk, A., Kandel, E., Massa, M. & Simonov, A. (2008), Portfolio Diversification and the Decision to Go Public, The Review of Financial Studies 21(4), 2779–2824.
- Guttman, I. & Kadan, O. and Kandel, E., (2006), A Rational Expectation Theory of Kinks in Financial Reporting, The Accounting Review 81(4), 811–848.
- Kandel, E., Foucault, T. and Kadan, O. (2005), Limit Order Book as a Market for Liquidity, The Review of Financial Studies 18(4), 1171–1217.
- Kandel, E. and Pearson, N. (2002), Option Value, Uncertainty and the Investment Decision, Journal of Financial and Quantitative Analyses 37(2), 341–374.
- Kandel, E. and Simhon, A. (2002), Between Search and Walras, The Journal of Labor Economics 20(1), 59–86
- Kandel, E. and Pearson, N. (2001), Flexibility vs. Commitment in Personnel Management, The Journal of Japanese and International Economics 15(4), 515–556.
- Kandel, E. and Zilberfarb, B. (1999), Differential Interpretation of Information in Inflation Forecasts, The Review of Economics and Statistics 81(2), 217–226.
- Kandel, E. and Marx, L. (1999), Payment for Order Flow on Nasdaq, Journal of Finance 54(1), 35–66.
- Barclay, M., Christie, W., Harris, J., Kandel, E., and Schultz, P. (1999), Effect of Market Reform on the Trading Cost and Depths of Nasdaq Stocks, Journal of Finance 54(1), 1–34.
- Kandel, E. and Marx, L. (1999), Odd Eighths Avoidance as a Defense Against SOES Bandits, Journal of Financial Economics 51(1), 85–102.
- Barclay, M., Kandel, E. and Marx, L. (1998), The Effect of Transaction Costs on Stock Prices and Trading Volume, Journal of Financial Intermediation 7(1), 130150 (lead article).
- Kandel, E. and Marx, L. (1997), Nasdaq Market Structure and Spread Patterns, Journal of Financial Economics 45, 61–89.
- Kandel, E. (1996), The Right to Return, Journal of Law and Economics 39(1), 329–355.
- Kandel, E. and Pearson, N. (1995), Differential Interpretation of Information and Trade in Speculative markets, Journal of Political Economy 103(4), 831–872.
- Kandel, E. and Lazear, E. (1992), Peer Pressure and Partnerships, Journal of Political Economy 100(4), 801–817.

== See also ==
- Economy of Israel
