= Baba Yaga is against! =

1980 animated film directed by Vladimir Pekar

Baba Yaga is against! (Russian: Баба-яга против!) is a 1979 Soviet three-part hand-drawn cartoon, released by the state-owned Soyuzmultfilm studio for the 1980 Summer Olympics.

== Plot ==
Misha the bear was chosen as the mascot of the Olympics, but Baba Yaga, together with the Serpent Gorynych and the "digger" Koshchei, seeks to prevent him from first getting to the Olympics, and then participating in it, but all their attempts end in failure.

It was written by Aleksandr Kurlyandsky, Grigory Oster, and Eduard Uspensky.
