= Valentina Leontyeva =

Soviet TV Presenter

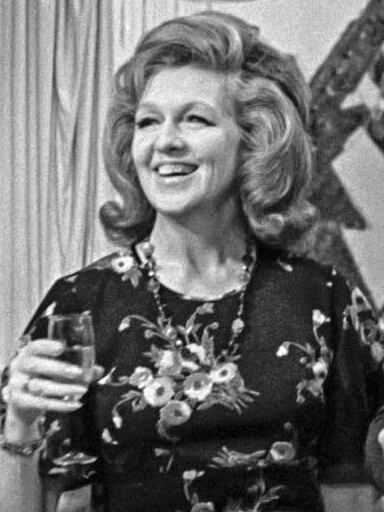
Leontyeva in 1975

Valentina Mikhaylovna Leontyeva (Russian: Валентина Михайловна Леонтьева; 1 August 1923 – 20 May 2007) was a famous anchor on Soviet TV. She was one of the first television presenters in the Soviet Union.

Leontyeva survived the Siege of Leningrad, which claimed the life of her father. After a brief stint at the Mendeleyev Institute, she attended the Vakhtangov Theatre School in Moscow. In 1948, she joined a theatre in Tambov.

As a TV anchor, she became famous for her deeply felt manner of presentation. Among her most popular shows was "Ot Vsei Dushi" ("From the Bottom of My Heart"), which has been praised for its honesty and emotional depth. She toured 54 cities of the Soviet Union with a stage version of the show. She was also the host of the Goluboy ogonyok ("Blue Light"), a New Year's Eve variety show, and Spokoinoi Nochi, Malyshi ("Good Night, Little Ones"), a daily program for children. In 1975, Leontyeva was awarded the USSR State Prize.

In the 1980s, she hosted Visit to Fairy Tales, a children's show, and became popularly known as simply "Aunt Valya" (Russian: Тётя Валя). Her popularity led to her being awarded the title of People's Artist of the USSR (1982), the highest honor that could be bestowed on a television presenter. On 12 March 2004 the Federation Council of Russia presented to her the medal "For Contributions", revived from the 19th century.

After her retirement from Channel One in 1991, Valentina Leontyeva lived with her sister in the Ulyanovsk Oblast up until her death.

There is a statue of her more than 2m in height on the Goncharov street in Ulyanovsk unveiled on 1 August 2008 in the garden of the Ulyanovskiy Regional Muppets Theater, which was recently named after Leontyeva.
