= Vyacheslav Kotyonochkin =

Soviet animator (1927–2000)

- Вячеслав Котёночкин
- Kotyonochkin in 1985
- Born: June 20, 1927; Moscow, USSR
- Died: November 20, 2000 (aged 73); Moscow, Russia
- Resting place: Vagankovo Cemetery
- Occupations: Animator; director
- Years active: 1947–1998
- Children: 2

Vyacheslav Mikhailovich Kotyonochkin (also known as Kotenochkin) (Russian: Вячеслав Михайлович Котёночкин) (June 20, 1927 – November 20, 2000) was a Soviet and Russian animation director, animator and artist. He was named People’s Artist of the RSFSR in 1987. He is most famous for directing the popular animated series Well, Just You Wait! He was also active as a comic artist.

== Early life ==
Vyacheslav Kotyonochkin was born in Moscow into a Russian family of Mikhail Mikhailovich Kotyonochkin (1900—1941), an accountant and a native Muscovite who died from tuberculosis shortly before the Great Patriotic War, and Eugenia Andreevna Kotyonochkina (née Shirshova) (1906—1962), a housewife whose family moved to Moscow from Kimry, Tver Governorate. His maternal grandfather Andrei Ivanovich Shirshov came from peasants, while his wife Maria Vasilievna Komissarova belonged to a wealthy family with an estate in Kimry which they had to abandon after the October Revolution. His earliest known paternal ancestor lived under a Koshkin surname (from the word koshka — cat) and owned a restaurant and a confectionery store in Moscow, but his twin sons were nicknamed "kittens" which transformed into a rare Kotyonochkin surname with time (from the word kotyonok — kitten). Vyacheslav was baptized in a Moscow Orthodox church soon after birth.

In 1938 he visited a New Year celebration for children at the House of the Unions where they were shown a collection of the first Soviet color animated films. He was so impressed that he started taking drawing courses at a Pioneers Palace. In 1942 Kotyonochkin finished seven classes of the middle school and entered an artillery special school, then he was sent to the Penza anti-tank artillery school where he studied until the war's end. He also learned to play cornet in a military band.

== Career ==
Soon after the war Kotyonochkin met the acclaimed Soviet animator Boris Dyozhkin who suggested him to enter the animation courses organized by Soyuzmultfilm. In 1947 he graduated and started his career as an animator at the studio. During the next 50 years he worked on more than 80 films. From 1962 on he served as an animation director. He became closely associated with the Fitil satirical almanac by Sergey Mikhalkov and created 17 animated shorts for it during the next 25 years.

Yet his name rose to fame only in 1969 when the first episode of Well, Just You Wait! was released. He picked the project after he accidentally stumbled across the screenwriters Felix Kamov, Arkadi Khait and Aleksandr Kurlyandsky who were wandering around Soyuzmultfilm trying to sell it to the leading directors without any success. Kotyonochkin was the only one who loved the idea and immediately drew the Hare character. He spent a lot of time developing Wolf though and ended up with a protagonist reminiscent of himself.

According to Vyacheslav's son and colleagues, as a young man he was rather undisciplined, loved to party and to pull pranks so that at one point he was nearly fired. The Wolf character inherited some of his features as well as gestures and movements. Vladimir Vysotsky served as another inspiration and was originally intended to do the voice-over, but wasn't approved by the studio executives. The art director Svetozar Rusakov had already worked with Kotyonochkin on Mezha (1969) and several Fitil episodes by that time.

Well, Just You Wait! wasn't supposed to become a long-running series, and the overwhelming popularity of the pilot episode came as surprise to its creators. From 1969 to 1986 Kotyonochkin directed a total of 16 episodes, and each of them turned an instant hit. Yet after each episode he wanted to end the series and switch to other projects. He managed to create several independent shorts in-between, including another popular comedy The Kitten from Lizyukov Street (1988). He also dreamed of directing an animated adaptation of Alexander Pushkin's epic poem Ruslan and Ludmila.

In 1988 Kotyonochkin was awarded the USSR State Prize. He was awarded the Order of Friendship on May 2, 1996. Yet the award he valued the most was the Order of the Smile granted to him by Polish children in 1985.

During the late perestroika years the Soviet government cut financing and he wasn't able to make anything else up until 1993 when he co-directed two new episodes of Well, Just You Wait! along with Vladimir Tarasov. Full of product placement and modern-day references, they left the fans disappointed. In 1999 he published a book of memoirs.

Vyacheslav Kotyonochkin died on 20 November 2000 in a Moscow hospital after several years of illness: he suffered from diabetes which led to a gangrene and a stroke. He was buried in the family tomb at the Vagankovo Cemetery.

In February 2014 an all-Russian poll was conducted by the Public Opinion Foundation. People were asked to name their favourite animated film or series. Well, Just You Wait! won by a wide margin.

== Family ==
- Wife — Tamara Petrovna Vishnyova (born 6 April 1928), a ballet dancer in the Moscow Operetta Theatre
  - Son — Aleksey Kotyonochkin (born 16 July 1958), Russian animation director, animator and art director
  - Daughter — Natalia Kotyonochkina
    - Granddaughter — Ekaterina Kotyonochkina, singer

== Selected filmography ==
=== Director ===
- 1962-1988 — Fitil (17 episodes)
- 1965 — Frog the Traveler (also art director)
- 1967 — Mezha
- 1969-1986; 1993-1994 — Well, Just You Wait!
- 1975 — On the Forest Trail (also screenwriter)
- 1982 — An Old Record (also screenwriter)
- 1988 — The Kitten from Lizyukov Street

=== Animator ===
- 1949 — Polkan and Shavka
- 1951 — Forrest Travelers
- 1952 — The Scarlet Flower
- 1952 — Kashtanka
- 1952 — The Snow Maiden
- 1954 — The Golden Antelope
- 1954 — The Orange Neck
- 1954 — Unusual Match
- 1956 — Old Friends
- 1957 — Once Upon a Time
- 1957 — Familiar Pictures
- 1958 — The Cat's House
- 1958 — A Tale of Malchish-Kibalchish
- 1960 — It Was I Who Drew the Little Man
- 1962 — The Wild Swans
- 1968 — Adventures of Mowgli. Episode 2: The Kidnapping
