= The British College =

Academic institution in Kathmandu, Nepal

Coordinates: 27.692352574°N 85.319518294°E

The British College, Kathmandu
- Established: 2011
- Students: 2000+
- Location: Kathmandu, Nepal
- Website: www.thebritishcollege.edu.np

The British College (also known as TBC) is an independent institution located in Trade Tower Business Center, Thapathali, Kathmandu. It offers British and international qualifications.

Following complaints and student protests in late 2025 claiming that the institution made false promises relating to their academic opportunities outside Nepal, the Nepali Ministry of Education, Science and Technology investigated TBC, and halted issuance of No Objection Certificates in relation to study at unaccredited institutions linked to the case.

== History ==
The British College was established in 2011 with the objective of providing undergraduate and postgraduate courses, awarded by reputable UK universities. As a subsidiary of the Kandel Foundation, TBC was founded by the CEO Rajen Kandel, along with his brother, Mahendra Kandel and father Upendra Sharma.
