= Lu and Bun =

- Screenplay by: Phùng Văn Hà
- Directed by: Phùng Văn Hà
- Country of origin: Vietnam
- Original language: Vietnamese

Production
- Producer: Phùng Văn Hà
- Running time: 10 minutes x 55 episodes
- Production company: Vietkite Media

Original release
- Release: 2009

Lu and Bun (Vietnamese: Lu và Bun) is a 2009 Vietnamese computer-animated comedy-adventure television series produced by Vietkite Media.

== Plot ==
Lion Lu and rabbit Bun were friends, but they have characters and favourites which were different each other. So, there're many funny and dramatic situations which happened.
