= Fitil =

- Directed by: Various, including Leonid Gaidai
- Country of origin: Russia
- Original language: Russian
- No. of episodes: 608

Production
- Running time: Varies by episode

Original release
- Network: Russia-1
- Release: 1962

Related
- Yeralash

Fitil (Russian: Фитиль, IPA: [fʲɪˈtʲilʲ], Fuse) is a popular Soviet short film and television anthology series which ran for 608 episodes. Some of the episodes were aimed at children, and were called Фитилёк, Fitilyok, Little Fuse. Each issue contained from the few short segments: documentary, fictional and animated ones. Fitilyok eventually became an entirely separate show for children and was renamed Yeralash, (Russian: Ералаш) meaning "jumble" or "mishmash."

It was directed by various artists, including Leonid Gaidai who presented his famous trio of Nikulin, Vitsin and Morgunov to the cast.

It was called "the anecdotes from the Soviet government" in the USSR.

== List of episodes ==
Number	Year	Plot	Description	Author and editor	Director	Cameraman, soundman and film editor	Artist	Composer	Actors	Studio
1	1962	In one boot	"Head of city pensioners" Tyutiryutin goes on a fishing trip. On his return his wife tells him, that in a meeting held in his absence, he was called a "fool". Tyutiryutin calls all his subordinates together, demanding to know who had called him a "fool". In the end he learns that he was called "fisherman", and not "fool".	Sergey Mikhalkov	Igor Ilyinsky, Arkady Koltsaty				Igor Ilyinsky, Olga Viklandt	Mosfilm
1	1962	Task	School task about "eyewash"	Leonid Lench	Lev Kulidzhanov, Isaak Magiton				Muza Krepkogorskaya	Gorky Film Studio
1	1962	Beet	Short animation about beet		Vyacheslav Kotyonochkin					Soyuzmultfilm
1	1962	Living corpse	Two men pretend to be dead, to avoid having to make alimony payments	Mark Abramov	Andrey Tutyshkin	Vladimir Nikolaev	Georgy Kolganov	Nikita Bogoslovsky	Sergey Filippov, Yevgeny Morgunov, Lubov Sokolova	Mosnauchfilm
3	1962	Ears	The head of the department makes a meaningless tirade about "if only there were mushrooms growing in your mouth" and what happens from this. His "efficiency" and "initiative" are noticed. They pull him up by the ears. Now he's a deputy manager, and his ears have grown. Again he is pulled up, he is already a manager with even longer ears. Then he delivers his meaningless speeches from a high rostrum, and his ears are very long. Who's pulling him by those ears?	Leonid Likhodeev, Sergey Mikhalkov	Andrey Tutyshkin				Ivan Lyubeznov	
3	1962	People's rubles	A steel plant in Cherepovets receives equipment that is not used	L. Pankin, Sergey Mikhalkov	L. Pankin	L. Pankin				CSDF (?)
3	1962	The virus of indifference	About problems of growing corn	Vladimir Kapninsky, Sergey Mikhalkov	Vladimir Pekar, Vladimir Popov				Yefim Berezin, Yury Timoshenko	Soyuzmultfilm
3	1962	Without thinking twice	About dismissive treatment with ancient monuments in Vitebsk	Yuri Yegorov	Yuri Yegorov	Yuri Yegorov				CSDF (?)
3	1962	Revanchist	Anti-fascist cartoon	Mark Abramov, Sergey Mikhalkov	Vyacheslav Kotyonochkin					Soyuzmultfilm
3	1962	Covered								

== See also ==
- Yeralash, another Soviet popular TV series for children
- Multiplikatsionniy Krokodil
