= Jessica Kandel =

Jessica Kandel is an American surgeon. She is the Mary Campau Ryerson Professor of Surgery and the Vice-Chair for Academic Affairs in the Department of Surgery at the University of Chicago.

== Education ==
Kandel graduated summa cum laude from Yale University in 1981, and completed her MD degree at Columbia University in 1985. She then went on to a General Surgery residency at the Massachusetts General Hospital in Boston (1986–1993). During her residency, Kandel completed a two-year surgical research fellowship with Dr. Judah Folkman at the Boston Children's Hospital, investigating mechanisms of tumor angiogenesis (new blood vessel development that "feeds" tumors).

== Career ==
Kandel joined Columbia University in 1995, becoming the Director of the Charles Edison Laboratory for Pediatric Surgical Research in 2000 and, in 2001, co-organized the first Columbia University Arden House Symposium on Angiogenesis. Kandel was a founding member of the Vascular Anomalies Group at Columbia, a multidisciplinary team treating children with vascular malformations, hemangioma, lymphatic tumors, and other disorders of vessel development. She was named the R. Peter Altman Chair in Pediatric Surgery at Columbia University in 2009, as a Professor of Surgery & Pediatrics in the Institute of Cancer Genetics at Columbia University.

Kandel was recruited to the University of Chicago in 2013 as the Surgeon-in-Chief for Comer Children's Hospital, the Chief of Pediatric Surgery, and the Mary Campau Ryerson Professor. She became the Vice-Chair of Academic Affairs for the Department of Surgery at the University of Chicago in 2023.

=== Research ===
In 1998, Kandel, Darrell Yamashiro, and colleagues at the Pediatric Tumor Biology Laboratory were the first to describe the way experimental pediatric tumor growth could be suppressed by blocking a molecule called vascular endothelial growth factor (VEGF) from performing its natural job. Their laboratory research provided key preclinical data about an antibody to VEGF, which was later humanized to become bevacizumab (Avastin, Genentech). Approved by the FDA in 2004 for adults with colorectal cancer, bevacizumab is now gaining use in the treatment of multiple adult and pediatric tumors.

Her focus in the laboratory has been to understand how tumors adapt to blockade of VEGF. Understanding how tumors become resistant to therapies that target recruited host cells may play an important role in the development of therapies for children with resistant cancers such as neuroblastoma, Wilms tumor, and hepatoblastoma.

Kandel developed a novel mouse model of lymphatic malformations, with her coinvestigator, Carrie Shawber.

== Honors ==
- President, American Pediatric Surgical Association, 2022-2023
- Grosfeld Lecture, American Pediatric Surgical Association, 2013
- Garrett Lecture, Johns Hopkins Medical Institutions, 2013
- R. Peter Altman Professor, Columbia University, 2009
- Elected, American Surgical Association, 2007
- Society for University Surgeons, 2005
- Harold and Golden Lamport Award for Clinical Research, Columbia University, May 2003
- Visiting Professor, Japanese Society for Pediatric Oncology, November 2003
- American Academy of Pediatrics Surgical Section Prize, "Combination Anti-Angiogenic Therapy," Oct. 2000

== Selected publications ==
- Kadenhe-Chiweshe A, Papa J, McCrudden KW, Frischer J, Bae JO, Huang J, Fisher J, Lefkowitch JH, Feirt N, Rudge J, Holash J, Yancopoulos GD, Kandel JJ, Yamashiro DJ. Sustained VEGF blockade results in microenvironmental sequestration of VEGF by tumors and persistent VEGF receptor-2 activation. Mol Cancer Res. 2008 Jan;6(1):1-9.
- Bender JL, Adamson PC, Reid JM, Xu L, Baruchel S, Shaked Y, Kerbel RS, Cooney-Qualter EM, Stempak D, Chen HX, Nelson MD, Krailo MD, Ingle AM, Blaney SM, Kandel JJ, Yamashiro DJ; Children's Oncology Group Study. Phase I trial and pharmacokinetic study of bevacizumab in pediatric patients with refractory solid tumors: a Children's Oncology Group Study. J Clin Oncol. 2008 Jan 20;26(3):399-405.
- Masciotti J, Abdoulaev G, Provenzano F, Hur J, Papa J, Bae J, Huang J, Yamashiro D, Kandel J, Hielscher A. Optical Tomographic and Magnetic Resonance Imaging of Tumor Growth and Regression in Mice treated with VEGF Blockade. Conf Proc IEEE Eng Med Biol Soc. 2005;1:205-8.
- Lee A, Frischer J, Serur A, Huang J, Bae JO, Kornfield ZN, Eljuga L, Shawber CJ, Feirt N, Mansukhani M, Stempak D, Baruchel S, Bender JG, Kandel JJ, Yamashiro DJ. Inhibition of cyclooxygenase-2 disrupts tumor vascular mural cell recruitment and survival signaling. Cancer Res. 2006 Apr 15;66(8):4378-84.
