= Felix Kandel =

Russian writer (born 1932)

- Феликс Кандель
- Born: Feliks Solomonovich Kandel; 21 October 1932 (age 93); Moscow, Russian SFSR, Soviet Union
- Other name: Felix Kamov
- Occupations: Author; screenwriter
- Years active: 1963–2014
- Notable work: Well, Just You Wait!

Feliks Solomonovich Kandel (Russian: Феликс Соломонович Ка́ндель; born 21 October 1932) is a Russian Jewish writer, residing in Jerusalem, Israel.

== Early life ==
He was born in 1932 in Moscow, Soviet Union, to a Jewish family. In 1941, his mother and he were evacuated to the Ural Mountains, where they remained until 1944. In 1950, he was admitted to the Moscow Aeronautic Institute, and graduated with an engineering degree in 1955. During his studies, he and a classmate started writing sketches and directing institute amateur performances. They quickly assembled a group of students around them, and continued to write for them after graduation.

Between 1955 and 1962, Kandel was designing missile engines for the Soviet military. At the same time he continued writing, under the pseudonym "Felix Kamov", mostly short stories and sketches for stand-up comedy.

In 1958, he married Tamara Abrina, also a graduate of the same institute. In 1959, their first child, Eugene, was born. Their younger son, Leonid Kandel, was born in 1967.

== Professional writer ==
In 1963, Kandel quit his military job and became a professional freelance writer. He wrote plays, scripts for motion pictures, and published (with co-authors Eduard Uspensky, Grigory Gorin, and Arkady Arkanov) two books of short stories. His works were published by Literaturnaya Gazeta, Yunost, Novy Mir, and other prestigious literary journals in Moscow. In 1965–1966, he worked as an editor in the short documentaries almanac "Fitil'!", but then became a free-lance writer again.

=== The Nu, pogodi! years ===
In 1967, Felix Kamov, Arkadiy Khait, and Alexander Kurlandsky began writing scripts for the animated series Nu, pogodi!, directed by Vyacheslav Kotyonochkin of the Soyuzmultfilm studio. From the very beginning, this became the most recognized animated series in the former Soviet Union, and later in the Eastern European countries. Today, it is hard to find a person in these countries, who would not recognize the wolf character from the series.

== Rediscovery of Jewish roots ==
In the late 1960s Kandel started writing prose, which was never published in the Soviet Union, since it was not politically correct enough for the times. Following the Six-Day War of Israel in 1967, he became more interested in his Jewish roots, and in 1970 started studying Hebrew. By September 1973, Kandel's family had decided to emigrate to Israel, and applied for an emigration visa. The Soviet authorities refused to let them leave. In the following four years, Kandel was very active in the Jewish movement. He was one of the editors of the underground journal on Jewish culture, “Tarbut”, participated in numerous demonstrations, and prolonged hunger strikes, and was jailed for 15 days following one of those demonstrations. He continued writing prose, some of which was published in the West while he was still in the Soviet Union.

In 1976 he was one of the organizers of the International Conference on Jewish Culture, that was supposed to be held in Moscow in late December. Most organizers were put under house arrest by the KGB, and their houses were searched. Kandel was warned by two KGB agents to stop his activities, but he refused. Two days later his older son was severely beaten by two well-dressed young men not far from his house. Several Jewish organizations in Europe and in the US took a particular interest in the Kandel family and started a vigorous campaign for their release. They were successful, and in November 1977, the family emigrated to Israel. Within a few months Kandel started working as a journalist at the Voice of Israel radio station. He specialized in programs on Jewish history and culture. At the same time he continued writing prose.

== Published work ==
Felix Kandel is a very well known author among Russian-language readers, especially in the West. His work was published in the leading Russian-language journals in the West, such as “Continent” (Paris), “Grani” (Munich), and “22” (Tel Aviv). Apart from Russian-language publications by Slovo (Moscow), Aliya Library (Jerusalem), Gesharim (Jerusalem) and others, several of his novels were published in French, German and Hebrew. While in Israel, Kandel has received four prestigious literary awards. The following novels by him were published in the West and in Russia since 1991 (also indicates the languages of translation):

- The Zone of Rest - Hebrew (HaKibutz HaMeuhad), and French (Gallimard, France);
- The Gates of Our Exodus - Hebrew (HaKibutz HaMeuhad);
- First Floor - German (Herder, Germany) and French (Noir sur Blanc, Switzerland);
- Into the Night;
- Corridor ;
- People Passing By - French (Gallimard, France);
- Word by Word - Hebrew (Am Oved), French (Editions du Griot, France);
- Not a Life Passed By ... - French (Noir sur Blanc, Geneva);
- From That Day On;
- Death of the Gerontologist.

Since 1987 Kandel initiated an ambitious project of writing a popular history of the Jews that lived on the territories comprising the Russian Empire. The resulting volumes titled, Books of Times and Events, appeared over the next 20 years in Russian and were well received by the public and the critics. All six volumes were published in Russia since 1994. Moscow and St. Petersburg Universities’ courses on Jewish History use it as reference source, and it is widely used in Jewish schools throughout the former Soviet Union. During the same period Kandel also published a popular history book on the Jewish emigration to Israel in the last 200 years, The Land Under our Feet.

Kandel received numerous literary awards, and is a member of the Israeli PEN Club since 1990.
