= Well, Just You Wait! =

Russian animated series

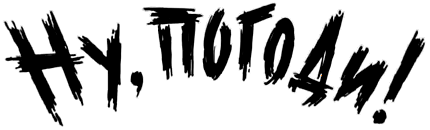
- Also known as: Ну, погоди! I'll Get You! You Just Wait; Nu, Pogodi!
- Genre: Comedy; Action
- Created by: Felix Kandel; Arkady Khait; Aleksandr Kurlyandsky
- Directed by: Gennady Sokolsky (pilot only); Vyacheslav Kotyonochkin; Vladimir Tarasov; Aleksey Kotyonochkin; Andrey Zhidkov
- Voices of: Anatoli Papanov; Klara Rumyanova; Igor Khristenko; Olga Zvereva; Boris Novikov; Garik Kharlamov; Dmitriy Khrustalev
- Countries of origin: Soviet Union (episodes 1–16); Russia (episodes 17–22)
- Original language: Russian
- No. of seasons: 1

Production
- Running time: 10 minute-long episodes approx.
- Production companies: Soyuzmultfilm (episodes 1–18); Studio 13 (episodes 17–18); Christmas Films (episodes 19–20)

Original release
- Network: Soviet Central Television (1969–1991); Channel 1 Ostankino (1991–1995); Channel One Russia (1995–2006)
- Release: 14 June 1969 – 23 December 2017

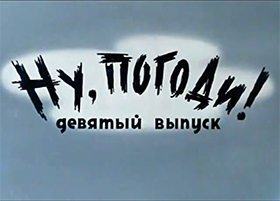

Well, Just You Wait! (Russian: Ну, погоди!, romanized: Nu, pogodi!, Russian pronunciation: [nʊpəgɐˈdʲi]), also known as I'll Get You! in official translations, is a Soviet and Russian series of animated short films produced by Soyuzmultfilm. In the 2014 all-Russian poll, Well, Just You Wait! won by a wide margin as people's favourite cartoon/animated series of all time.

The series follows the comical adventures of Wolf (Волк), trying to catch – and presumably eat – Hare (Заяц). It features additional characters that usually either help the hare or interfere with the Wolf's plans. The original film language is Russian, but very little speech is used, usually interjections or at most several sentences per episode. The series' most common line is the eponymous "Nu, pogodi!", yelled by the wolf when his plans fail. It also includes many grunts, laughs, and songs.

== Characters ==
=== The Hare ===
The Hare, commonly transliterated into English as Zayats (Russian: Заяц), is portrayed as a supposedly positive hero. He is less developed than the Wolf, and most of his actions are simply reactions to the Wolf's schemes. In later episodes, the role of the Hare becomes more active and developed, and he even manages to save the Wolf on several occasions. The Hare is portrayed as a percussionist in a number of episodes. The character was originally voiced by Klara Rumyanova.

The Hare is often mistaken as a female due to his appearance and voice; however, the Hare's sex is never explicitly indicated. The Russian word for hare, заяц (zayats), is of masculine gender. The female equivalent is зайчиха (zaychikha).

The Hare is almost always seen wearing the same green T-shirt over a sleeveless white turtleneck and dark green shorts, unlike the Wolf's ever-varying wardrobe. There are rare exceptions, however: in the prologue of Episode 8, he appears in an ice-skating outfit, and later on in the same episode, he is dressed with intentional absurdity as the grandfatherly Ded Moroz (Grandfather Frost), the silliness of which is only heightened by the Wolf then appearing as his granddaughter, Snegurochka, also known as the Snow Maiden.

=== The Wolf ===
The Wolf, commonly transliterated into English as Volk (Russian: Волк), is initially portrayed as a hooligan who eagerly turns to vandalism, abuses minors, breaks laws, and is a smoker. His appearance was inspired by a person the director Vyacheslav Kotyonochkin saw on the street, specifically a man with long hair, a protruding belly, and a thick cigarette between his lips. The character was originally voiced by Anatoli Papanov.

His most common line throughout the series when things are not going as he expected is "Nu, pogodi!" At the end of an episode (and at the end of the pre-title introduction), the Wolf usually exclaims the series' titular phrase, "Nu, Zayats... Nu, pogodi!" which translates as "Well, Hare... Well, just you wait!".

In spite of his rough appearance, many of the Wolf's attempts to catch the Hare are often characterized by unexpected abilities on his part (including figure skating, ballet, gymnastics, and waltzing) for humorous contrast. He can also play the guitar very well and rides a powerful rocker motorbike. In the first episode, while climbing a high building to catch the Hare, the Wolf whistles the popular mountaineer song, "A Song About a Friend" (a signature song of Vladimir Vysotsky). In spite of these talents, most of the Wolf's schemes eventually fail or turn against him.

During the late Soviet and post-Soviet era, however, the Wolf gradually became more buffoonish than menacing. In the last episode (#20), for example, the Wolf is seen chewing a lollipop instead of smoking and his drawing style is reminiscent of new Russian cartoons (Russian: Новые русские мультфильмы) rather than the old Soviet slapstick genre. The Wolf became increasingly timid or even outright cowardly during this time period, contrasting sharply with his initially "macho" persona and actor's voice.

The Wolf's most characteristic piece of clothing is his bell-bottoms which can ambiguously be either part of the naval uniform or the 1970s fashion. He is most often seen in a pink shirt with a yellow necktie, but occasionally (Episode 7) appears in a naval undershirt (telnyashka) and in Episode 8, he appears in drag, impersonating the Snegurochka. In Episode 11 he wears a jacket in the beginning, but soon removes it when chasing the Hare. Not infrequently, he loses most of his clothes during the chase, going on in his chintz underpants only (those are a realistic depiction of Soviet-style underwear), though in episode 6, he retains only his shirt and pulls it down to cover up his "naked" hindquarters. Humorously, all of his clothing below the waist has a special opening for his tail.

In Episodes 1–16 the Wolf's hairstyle is basically unchanged, though in Episode 14 his hair gets briefly done in a style not unlike Elvis Presley's. In Episode 17 he wears a ponytail, and in Episode 18 his forelock is cropped and the mullet is tied into a ponytail. However, in the three final episodes he resumes his earlier hairstyle of episodes 1–16.

=== Other characters ===
The story also features a supporting cast of animal characters, the most commonly appearing of whom is the physically strong and heavy Hippopotamus (Russian: Бегемот Begemot), who participates in various roles (e.g., a museum caretaker, shop keeper, passer-by, doorkeeper, etc.) and whom the Wolf usually annoys and has to run away from. In Episode #5 (1972), the Hare finds the Wolf hidden among watermelons (the Wolf's cap camouflages him in the scene). The Hare recommends to the passing Hippopotamus, who's also looking to buy melons, one which actually winds up being the Wolf's head. The Hippopotamus squeezes Wolf's head to test the ripeness of the "watermelon", and inadvertently forces him out of hiding. The episode ends with Wolf (on a washbowl) sliding down into the Moscow Metro and slamming head-on into, and ending up under the Hippopotamus.

Another repeating character is the Cat (Russian: Кот Kot), who is an illusionist and appears in several stage performances throughout the series. The Cat is shown to be a good magician, but very self-absorbed and highly sensitive to applause. In Episode #9 (1976), the Cat traps the Wolf in his levitation act (which saves the Hare from being caught). He drops the Wolf twice in his act to acknowledge and accept the applause from the Hare.

One of the most appearing on-screen secondary characters in a single episode is the Walrus (Russian: морж Morzh), who is the uniformed navy captain of the ship in Episode #7, who keeps interfering with the Wolf's attempts at boarding the ship and/or attempting to capture the Hare. However, once the Wolf is on board, he pretends to mop the deck in front of the Captain, tricking him into believing he is one of the crew members. The Captain is later seen closing the lid on top of the boat's storage room, which results in the Wolf and Hare being trapped together in the darkness.

Other animals are shown in the series, including bears (often depicted as the Militsiya), red foxes, elephants, beavers, dogs, and pigs (in a swimming suit with three bras).

== Episode structure ==
Each 10-minute episode starts with a logo of the studio (Soyuzmultfilm in episodes 1–18, Studio 13 in episodes 17 and 18, and Christmas Films in episodes 19 and 20), after which a prologue begins. The prologue is a separate short story, approximately 2 minutes long, at the end of which the Wolf shouts "Well, [rabbit], just you wait!". After that, the screen shows the show's title and episode with the opening credits roll. The remainder of the episode is covered by the main plot, also ending with Wolf shouting "Well, just you wait!".

== Production ==
=== 1960s to 1980s ===
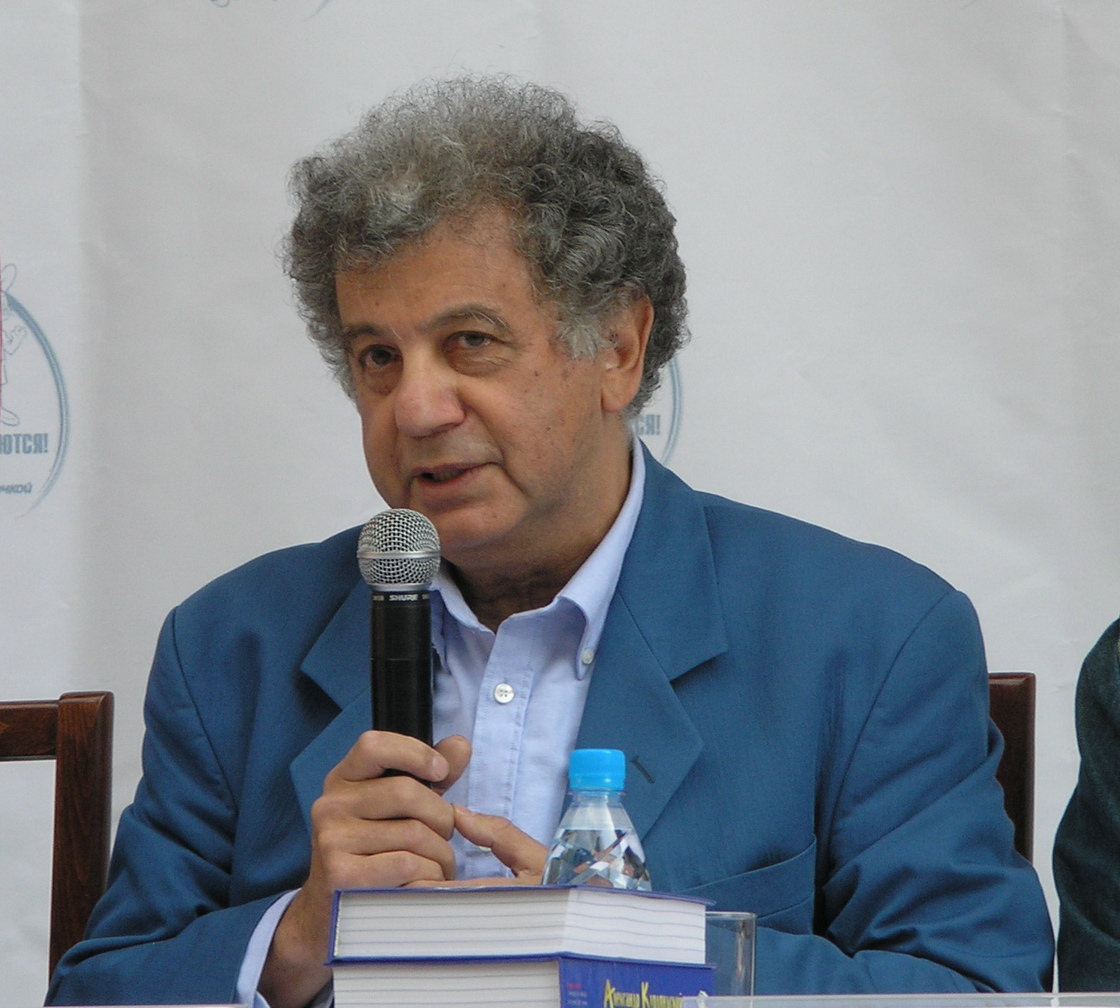
The writer Aleksandr Kurlyandsky created the script of Nu, pogodi! together with Felix Kandel and Arkady Khait. Kurlyandsky is the only one of them who worked on all 20 episodes of the series.

The original script for Nu, pogodi! was created for the animation studio Soyuzmultfilm in Moscow by the writers Felix Kandel, Arkady Khait, and Aleksandr Kurlyandsky, whose works included humourist and satirical writings. Most directors of Soyuzmultfilm rejected the script, but Vyacheslav Kotyonochkin was convinced by the idea. However, Gennady Sokolsky was the first person to direct the cartoon, more specifically a pilot of it, which was given the name Nu, pogodi! A two and a half-minute short film with character designs very different from the later series was created, but it already featured the Wolf's titular catchphrase. It was shown as part of the first episode of the animation magazine Happy Merry-Go-Round in 1969.

Kotyonochkin wanted the Wolf to be voiced by the actor and singer Vladimir Vysotsky, but was not given permission by the officials. The actor Anatoli Papanov was approved instead. Actress Klara Rumyanova, who commonly voiced cute and small characters, received the role of the Hare. Svetozar Rusakov was responsible for the visual design of the series, including its characters. The majority of the soundtrack throughout the series during Soviet times was edited directly from existing international records, though there were also original compositions.

The first episode aired in 1969. Nu, pogodi! was not intended to become a long-running series, but the cartoon reached immense popularity and Soyuzmultfilm received many letters from viewers asking for more adventures of Wolf and Hare. Therefore, production of new shorts continued into the 1980s. However, it was temporarily halted for political reasons after the seventh episode in 1973, as script writer Felix Kandel and his family wanted to emigrate to Israel, but were denied by the Soviet authorities. Nonetheless, production soon resumed, though without Kandel, as Nu, pogodi! viewers were among the highest party leadership.

Episode 16, the last film created during the Soviet era, aired in 1986. The series was put on hold after the death of Anatoli Papanov in 1987.

=== 1990s to present ===
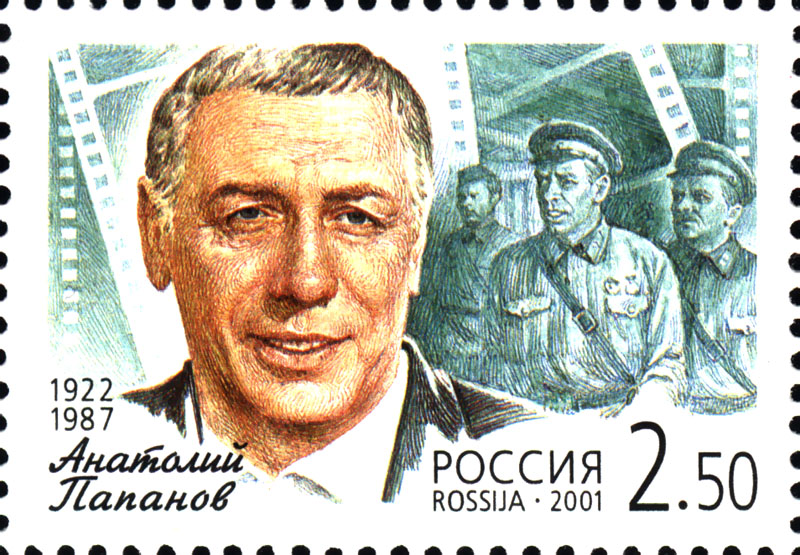
Anatoli Papanov as depicted on a 2001 stamp, voice of the Wolf in episodes 1 to 16. Production was put on hold after his death, but archived voice recordings of him were later used for the 17th and 18th episode.

It turned out that all outtakes of Papanov's work for the series had been archived. The voice samples were used for the creation of the 17th and 18th episodes in 1993. They were produced by Soyuzmultfilm in collaboration with the Ukrainian Institute for Professional Advancement of Film, Television and Radio Workers (credited as Studio 13) and were co-directed by Vladimir Tarasov. The 17th episode in particular was dedicated to the 25th anniversary of Nu, pogodi! Both shorts are notable for their use of product placement for the sponsor of the films, AMT, as well as for Nokia. Kotyonochkin's son Aleksey Kotyonochkin, who had also become an animation artist, took part in their production, although he had unsuccessfully tried to convince his father not to participate. The two episodes were met with negative reactions.

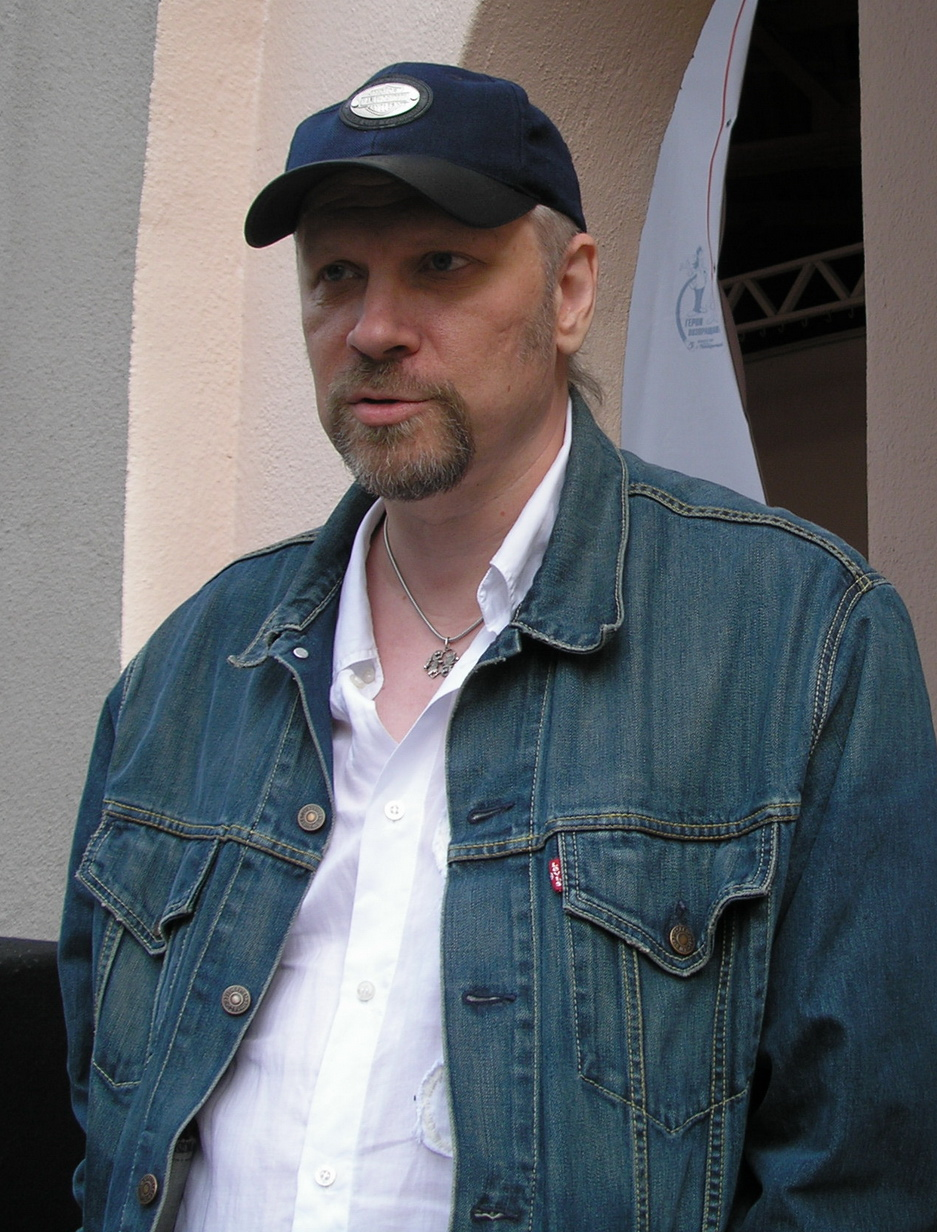
Aleksey Kotyonochkin, son of Vyacheslav Kotyonochkin, worked with his father on episodes 17 and 18 as their art director. More than a decade later, Aleksey himself directed two episodes of Nu, pogodi!

In February 2005, the supermarket chain Pyaterochka announced that they had purchased the rights to create two new Nu, pogodi! films. The idea to support the production of new episodes arose during a corporate party of the company in 2003. Late Vyacheslav Kotyonochkin's son Aleksey was offered to direct them, but initially hesitated to accept, as he was not sure whether the standards set in Soviet times could be achieved, and also because of the failure of the 17th and 18th episode. He eventually agreed and assembled a team of young animators at the studio Christmas Films, their average age being 30. The production was funded by Pyaterochka with a budget of 400,000 dollars.

The scripts were written by Nu, pogodi! co-creators Aleksandr Kurlyandsky and Felix Kandel again, the latter being involved in the creation of new episodes for the first time in more than three decades. The actors Igor Khristenko and Olga Zvereva became the new voices of Wolf and Hare, respectively. It was stated that their voices are "virtually indistinguishable" from the original ones.

It was not possible anymore to simply insert popular international music into the shorts like during Soviet times, as copyright had to be taken into account now. The budget did not allow for obtaining music rights. Therefore, it was decided to approach a domestic artist, namely Andrei Derzhavin of the band Mashina Vremeni, who immediately agreed to create a diverse soundtrack. In an interview, Kotyonochkin noted that Nu, pogodi! and Mashina Vremeni debuted the same year.

On 16 September 2005, a costume parade was held on the Arbat in honour of the cartoon's revival. The premiere of episode 19 took place on 22 December of the same year. Unlike the previous two episodes, the Pyaterochka-funded shorts are free of advertising, the sponsor is only mentioned in the credits.

For two years, the latest two Nu, pogodi! episodes were largely unavailable to the public and were only shown at certain film festivals. However, in late December 2007 a DVD was finally released in Russia which contained the two films, as well as a making-of film and comics drawn by Aleksey Kotyonochkin. As of now, it is available only in the supermarket chains Pyaterochka and Perekrestok.

Regarding questions on a possible continuation of the series, Kotyonochkin stated in 2006 that it is "impossible to produce the series endlessly" and that they didn't intend to "copy Tom and Jerry". If a follow-up was made, it would be very different from the existing films according to Kotyonochkin, possibly a full-length film in the format of 3D animation with a brand new story.

== Cultural references ==
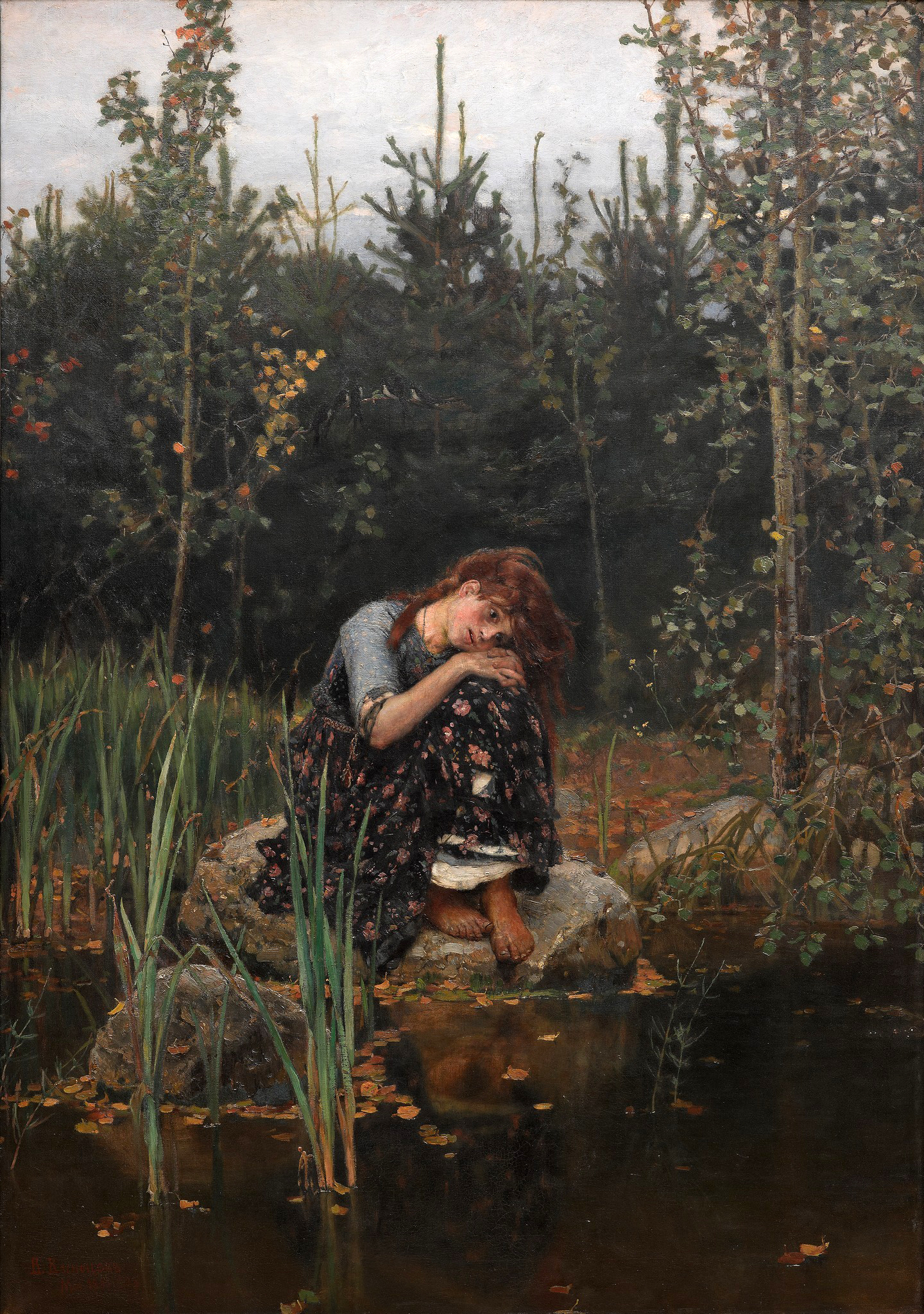
Sister Alenushka Weeping about Brother Ivanushka (painting by Viktor Vasnetsov, 1881), Russian variant collected by Alexander Afanasyev in Narodnye russkie skazki.

The female Fox singer in Episode 15 is based upon Alla Pugacheva. The Hare's subsequent performance in drag is a parody of one of her songs popular at the time.

A cameo of a sitting girl in Episode 16 refers to Viktor Vasnetsov's painting Sister Alenushka Weeping about Brother Ivanushka. The key is that Alyonushka is the heroine of the folk-tale Brother and Sister. She apparently mistakes the Wolf, who had been transformed into a goat, for her brother.

== Critical and popular reception ==
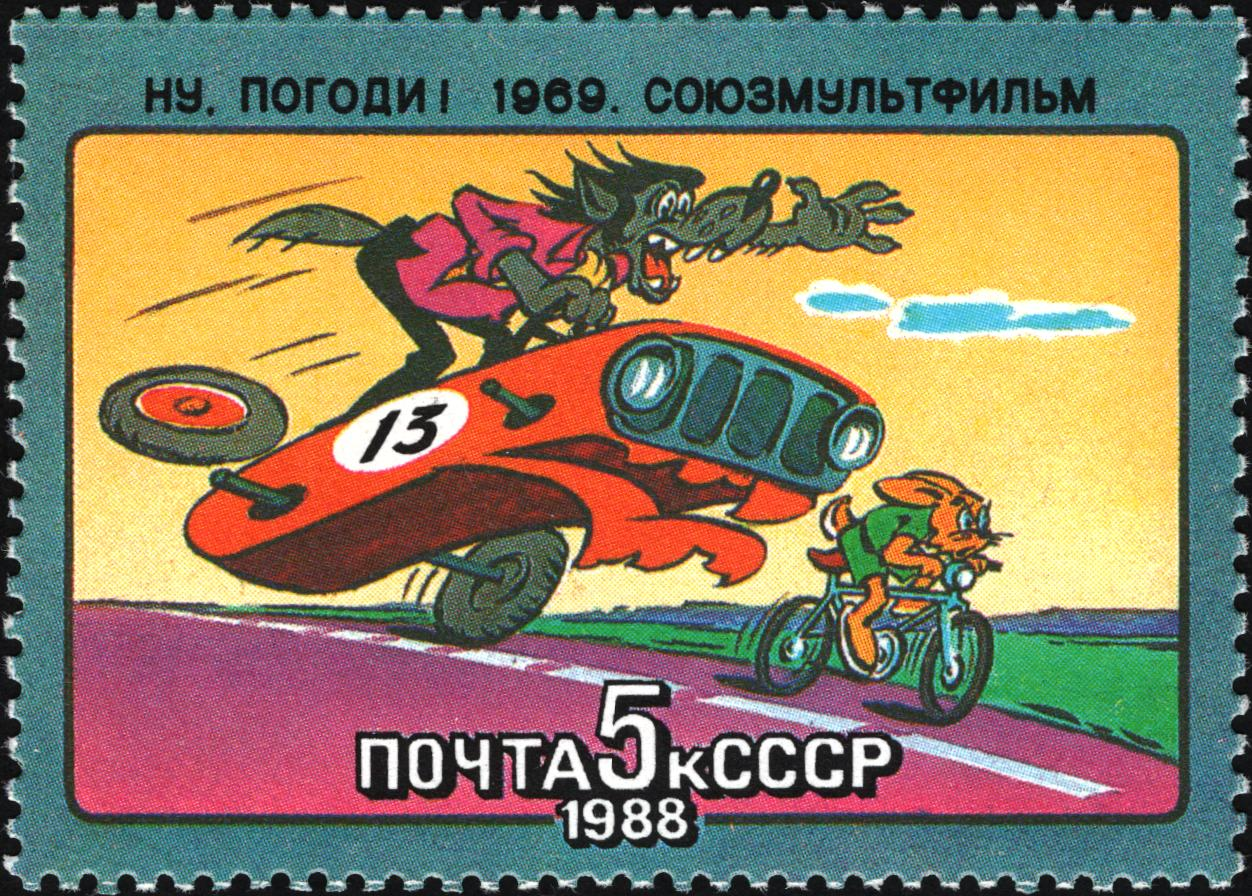
A USSR stamp from 1988, depicting Nu, pogodi!

The series was, for many years, hugely popular among the Soviet public, and it is popular in Russia to this day. The critical reaction of the director's colleagues was less favourable. The director's son Aleksey Kotyonochkin recalls how, although nobody said it to his father outright, the animators and directors of Soyuzmultfilm generally considered Nu, pogodi! to be of low quality. For his part, Vyacheslav Kotyonochkin was not a follower of auteur films (many of which were being made at the studio at the time) and considered them to be examples of someone needlessly showing off.

Kotyonochkin disliked subtext and tried to create very simple, straightforward scenarios. The main idea of the series was simple: don't hurt the little guy or you will yourself get into a foolish situation. Because the series was so popular, however, it was often a subject for critical discussion and speculation – namely, that the series represented the struggle between the intelligentsia (Hare) and the working class (Wolf). Aleksey Kotyonochkin dismisses these interpretations as groundless.

Since the 1990s, when the fall of the Iron Curtain allowed better exchange of films, both Russian and Western audiences have noted similarities between Nu, pogodi! and American cartoons, the most noticeable being Tom and Jerry. The director has admitted that he was learning from Disney animated films which were brought into the USSR from Germany immediately after World War II, particularly Bambi. However, he did not see any Tom and Jerry episodes until his son bought a VCR in 1987. Thematically, Nu, pogodi! places greater emphasis on various real-life situations and locations.

== List of episodes ==
Note: The episodes of Nu, pogodi! were unnamed but rather numbered. Each episode has a different setting:

No.	Title	Directed by	Written by	Original release date
0	"Well, just you wait! (Happy Merry-Go-Round)"	Gennady Sokolsky	Felix Kandel, Aleksandr Kurlyandsky, Arkady Khait	6 May 1969
The pilot wasn't made with a continuation in mind, thus it isn't considered a part of the series' main run. The design of the Hare and the Wolf are noticeably different compared to episode 1 and onwards. It was created for a compilation of animated shorts, "Happy Merry-Go-Round". The Hare’s mother is shown for the first and only time, and, in this episode specifically, the Hare is depicted as a child, rather than an "adult" with his own apartment.
1	"Hare's Apartment, the Beach"	Vyacheslav Kotyonochkin	Felix Kandel, Aleksandr Kurlyandsky, Arkady Khait	14 June 1969
The Wolf climbs up the building where the Hare resides by a clothes-hanging rope. The Hare cuts the rope and the Wolf free-falls into the Police's vehicle. The Wolf goes to the beach and catches sight of the Hare water skiing. The Wolf chases the Hare around and finally gets pulled away by a canoe.
2	"Fairground at Night"	Vyacheslav Kotyonochkin	Felix Kandel, Aleksandr Kurlyandsky, Arkady Khait	18 July 1970
The Wolf carries a guitar around and starts singing while the Hare passes by. He swallows the Hare's balloon and becomes afloat. The Wolf chases the Hare around the fairgound but fails to catch him at the last minute.
3	"Highway"	Vyacheslav Kotyonochkin	Felix Kandel, Aleksandr Kurlyandsky, Arkady Khait	29 May 1971
The Hare goes cycling on a bright day. The Wolf intends to chase him with his badass motorbike. Everything quickly runs downhill.
4	"Sports Stadium"	Vyacheslav Kotyonochkin	Felix Kandel, Aleksandr Kurlyandsky, Arkady Khait	26 June 1971
The Wolf goes to a stadium, looking all chic and sporty. He engages in a bunch of sport activities but messes everything up.
5	"City Street, Metro"	Vyacheslav Kotyonochkin	Felix Kandel, Aleksandr Kurlyandsky, Arkady Khait	23 September 1972
The Wolf spies on the Hare by a monocular and then bags him as he hops down the stairs. The Wolf hides the bag in a telephone booth. The Hare gets out and traps the Wolf instead. Later, the Wolf disguises himself as a watermelon and almost caught the Hare, but the Hippopotamus comes to the rescue. The Wolf gets his head stuck in a trolleybus's door while chasing the Hare. They both run into a train station where the Wolf runs into the Hippopotamus again.
6	"Countryside"	Vyacheslav Kotyonochkin	Felix Kandel, Aleksandr Kurlyandsky, Arkady Khait	21 April 1973
The Wolf follows The Hare during a parachute session and ends up in a chicken coop. He then runs around messing up the farm. He dresses himself as a scarecrow on a train that the Hare takes but ends up falling off.
7	"Cruise Ship at Sea"	Vyacheslav Kotyonochkin	Felix Kandel, Aleksandr Kurlyandsky, Arkady Khait	12 May 1973
The Wolf makes his stowaway on a cruise ship. This is the only episode that the Wolf doesn't say "Nu, pogodi!" in the intro act in which those words are uttered by the mad Walrus ship captain when a dazed Wolf said he was Rabbit to get on the ship (a pun on the word for Hare, заяц, also meaning stowaway). After a lot of mishaps, the Wolf and the Hare allied to save themselves and the ship from sinking.
8	"Ski Resort"	Vyacheslav Kotyonochkin	Aleksandr Kurlyandsky, Arkady Khait	5 January 1974
The Wolf is ice skating near a carnival party at a ski resort when he meets Hare. They chase each other around the venue, bothering the Hippopotamus guard. They end up dressing as Ded Moroz and Snegurochka and singing a duet. The Hare escapes just before the Wolf is stranded in an avalanche.
9	"Wolf's House, TV Station"	Vyacheslav Kotyonochkin	Aleksandr Kurlyandsky, Arkady Khait	4 September 1976
While the Wolf is watching sports on television (presumably soccer), his television switches to a channel featuring the Hare singing. Furious, the Wolf destroys his TV and rushes to the Ostankino Technical Center (which today includes the headquarters of Channel One Russia, VGTRK, and Gazprom Media's NTV) to capture the Hare. The episode features different settings used in the chase (rock band, circus, knights, magician), ending with the magician sending the Wolf back to his house.
10	"Construction Site"	Vyacheslav Kotyonochkin	Aleksandr Kurlyandsky, Arkady Khait	9 October 1976
The Hare comes to a construction site, watching workers demolishing and constructing buildings, while the Wolf resorts to using the different kinds of equipment to catch him. However, all of the Wolf's plans ended up in vain. Even worse, the Wolf ends up in hospital when trying to escape a closed building. The episode is worthy for reference back to the first scene in the first episode (the Hare was watering the flowers, while the Wolf was climbing the rope to catch him), but as a parody, the roles were switched. Note: In this episode, the Wolf was voiced by a different voice actor - Gennadiy Dudnik, because Anatoliy Papanov was on a tour when the episode came out.
11	"Circus"	Vyacheslav Kotyonochkin	Aleksandr Kurlyandsky, Arkady Khait	30 July 1977
The Wolf and the Hare participate in a circus, where the Wolf is almost eaten by a snake as well as a lion if not for the Cat.
12	"Museum"	Vyacheslav Kotyonochkin	Aleksandr Kurlyandsky, Arkady Khait	8 April 1978
The duo winds up in a museum where the Wolf again constantly bothers the museum guard, Hippopotamus.
13	"Olympics"	Vyacheslav Kotyonochkin	Aleksandr Kurlyandsky, Arkady Khait	17 May 1980
The Wolf and Hare both have a series of mishaps in the 1980 Summer Olympics in Moscow.
14	"High-Tech Center"	Vyacheslav Kotyonochkin	Aleksandr Kurlyandsky, Arkady Khait	2 June 1984
The Wolf and the Hare's visit to a center of high technology goes awry when a Hare-shaped robot turns rogue and tries to capture the Wolf. At the brink of being captured, the Wolf turns to Hare for help, and the rogue is disabled. However, the Hare uses another robot to kick the Wolf out of the center. The episode features science fiction themes including artificial intelligence and automation.
15	"Theater"	Vyacheslav Kotyonochkin	Aleksandr Kurlyandsky, Arkady Khait	22 June 1985
The Hare is performing in a choir, and the Wolf sneaks into the theater to grab him. During his pursuit of the Hare, the Wolf finds himself performing on stage, first as a choir master, then as a ballet dancer. Eventually the Wolf captures the Hare and tries to sneak him out of the building in a guitar case, but a mix-up causes him to leave with nothing but a guitar.
16	"Various Scenes from Russian Fairytales"	Vyacheslav Kotyonochkin	Aleksandr Kurlyandsky, Arkady Khait	27 September 1986
The Wolf suffers a heat stroke at a beach, after which he imagines being in various scenes from Russian storytales like the Golden Fish, Cinderella, Baba Yaga, The Bold Knight, the Apples of Youth, and the Water of Life, Brother and Sister, and Little Red Riding Hood. Note: This is the last episode made in USSR and the last episode where Anatoliy Papanov voiced the Wolf before his death in 1987.
17	"Wolf's House, Desert"	Vyacheslav Kotyonochkin, Vladimir Tarasov	Aleksandr Kurlyandsky	1 April 1993
For the 25th Anniversary of the series, the Hare visits the Wolf with a cake. However, the Wolf blows the candles, and the cake is splattered all over his painting. The two engage in a hot-air balloon chase but the Wolf's balloon travels too high and freezes. They end up in a desert where a tribe is ironically watching "Nu, pogodi" on a TV. They chase the Wolf but the Hare distracts them. A tornado comes and the Wolf is stranded in the ocean. Note: In this episode, just like in the next one, an archived voices of Anatoliy Papanov were used for voicing the Wolf.
18	"Supermarket"	Vyacheslav Kotyonochkin, Vladimir Tarasov	Aleksandr Kurlyandsky	24 June 1994
The Wolf follows the Hare into a large supermarket, but things go wrong when the Wolf hides in a safe from the angry store manager. The action culminates in a lightsaber duel between robots used by the Hare and the Wolf.
19	"The Beach"	Aleksey Kotyonochkin	Felix Kandel, Aleksandr Kurlyandsky	22 December 2005
The Hare arrives to a resort city by plane, where he is met by the Wolf in the baggage claim. The Hare escapes, but the Wolf then positions himself under a waterslide at the beach to catch the Hare. The Hare lets Hippopotamus go first, and the Wolf is crushed. After trying to disguise himself as the Pig, the Hare hijacks a parasailing boat with the Hare connected to it, but they end up almost being eaten by a shark.
20	"Hare's Apartment, Countryside"	Aleksey Kotyonochkin	Felix Kandel, Aleksandr Kurlyandsky	7 October 2006
As a parody to episode one, the Wolf tries again to infiltrate Hare's apartment by climbing up the wall using glue, while the Hare is playing the song "Chocolate Hare". In the Wolf's countryside home, he comes up with a plan to again enter Hare's dacha but this fails. They both go out to pick mushrooms and the Wolf chases Hare on a moped but ends up crashing in his own dacha. Note: This episode was devoted to Vyacheslav Kotyonochkin.
21	"New Year at Home, Forest"	Aleksey Kotyonochkin	Felix Kandel, Aleksandr Kurlyandsky	21 December 2012
The Wolf catches the Hare at a performance, but the Hare acquires a pipe that makes nearby objects levitate. The Wolf goes ice fishing and finds the Hare but is chased by an angry pike.
22	"Catch A Star"	Aleksey Kotyonochkin	Felix Kandel, Aleksandr Kurlyandsky	23 December 2017
The Wolf is on top of an apartment building and uses a spyglass to see a shooting star. He spots the Hare, so he falls down, but the wind catches his jacket, and he sees inside the building at different rooms with different TV shows on. The last room has an animal opening a bottle of champagne and it scares the Wolf out of his trance. He lands in the snowbank and chases hare. He punches an ice sculpture of Hare and mutters his catchphrase. He continues to chase the shooting star and The Hare, even pointing it out to some animals around a Christmas tree. The Wolf and the Hare wish everyone a Happy New Year.

There was also a promotional 30 min. long episode show including various characters from Soviet cartoons released in 1981 called The Lost Episodes. The show featured three never before seen sequences of Nu Pogodi! of approximate 10 min. length and were not re-released for home entertainment in spite of various full episode collections. They can, however, be seen on television on some channels during children cartoons time and are viewable through web video recordings (such as YouTube).

In August 2012, it was decided television airing of the cartoons would not cut out scenes of the Wolf smoking because of laws prohibiting material "deemed harmful to children". An agreement was made, "We will not cut anything, not even one cigarette."

== Cast and crew ==
=== Directors ===
- Vyacheslav Kotyonochkin − 1–18
- Vladimir Tarasov − 17–18
- Aleksey Kotyonochkin − 19–21

=== Screenplay ===
- Felix Kandel (credited as Felix Kamov) − 1–7 and 19–21
- Arkady Khait − 1–16
- Aleksandr Kurlyandsky − all

=== Main animators – character development ===
- Svetozar Rusakov − 1–16
- Aleksey Kotyonochkin − 17–18
- Svetlana Davidova − 19 and 21

=== Voices ===
- Anatoli Papanov (Wolf) − 1–16 (17 and 18 uses archive footage)
- Klara Rumyanova (Hare) − 1–18, (Robot Hare) - 14
- Igor Khristenko (Wolf) − 19–21
- Olga Zvereva (Hare) − 19–21
- Vladimir Soshalsky (Captain Walrus) - 7, (Hippopotamus) − 15, (Wolf from the Little Red Riding Hood) – 16
- Gennady Khazanov (Soviet Central Television Narrator, various voices) - 9
- Gennady Dudnik (Wolf (some lines)) - 10
- Boris Novikov (Referee Dog) – 13
- Maria Vinogradova (Japanese Hare) – 13
- Sergei Chekan (AMT Announcer) – 17

=== Camera ===
- Yelena Petrova − 1–6
- Nina Klimova − 7
- Svetlana Kascieieva − 8–13
- Svetlana Koscieieva — 14
- Aleksandr Chekhovskiy − 15–16
- Lyudmila Krutovskaja − 17–18
- Dariya Kondoreva - 19–21
- Marina Erokhina - 19–21

=== Sound directors ===
- Georgi Martyniuk − 1–10
- Vladimir Kutuzov − 0 and 11–18
- Karlon - 19–21 and 38

=== Editors ===
- Tatyana Sazonova − 1–7
- Margarita Micheeva − 8–18

=== Animators ===
- Viktor Arsentev − 1–15
- Oleg Komarov − 1–13
- Vladimir Shevchenko - 19
- Vasiliy Shevchenko - 19
- Natalya Malgina - 19
- Nataliya Bogomolova - 19
- Victor Ulitin - 19–21
- Tatyana Podgorskaya - 19–21
- Vladimir Maslenikov - 21
- Milana Fedoseeva - 21
- Boris Nagotnyakov - 21
- Rim Sharafutdinov - 19–21
- Alexey Ignatov - 20
- Pavel Nastanyuk - 20
- Ekaterina Shabanova - 20
- Marina Shabanova - 20
- Radik Kambulatov - 20
- Alexander Griga - 20
- Viktor Likchacev − 1, 3, 4, 7, 9, 11, 13 and 15
- Oleg Safronov − 1, 2, 9, 10, 14 and 15
- Vladimir Krumin − 1, 5, 10, 11, 13 and 14
- Fedor Eldinov − 1, 3, 6, 7, 12, 13, 15 and 16
- Vladimir Zarubin − 2, 4 and 9
- Leonid Kayukov − 2, 5 and 7
- Valery Ugarov − 3, 8 and 16
- Sergey Dezhkin − 3
- Yuriy Butyrin − 3, 4, 8 and 9
- Vladimir Arbekov − 8, 12 and 17
- Aleksandr Panov − 7
- Aleksey Bukin − 8
- Aleksandr Davydov − 10, 13 and 17
- Aleksandr Dorogov − 14–16
- Nikolay Fyodorov − 12
- Aleksandr Mazaev − 15 and 16
- Sergey Avramov − 14
- Olga Orlova − 16

== Music ==
A number of memorable tunes were written or selected to match the action sequences of the cartoon. The majority of the soundtrack was edited directly from various international lounge and dance LP records from the 1960s–1980s, many of which were part of the music supervisors' personal collections. These recordings were not listed in the credits, so the origins of some remain obscure today.

Some of the known performers whose music was featured in Nu Pogodi are Chico Buarque, Herb Alpert, Nikolai Rimsky-Korsakov, Digital Emotion, Günter Gollasch, Vyacheslav Mescherin, Bill Haley, Ted Heath, Leroy Holmes, Halina Kunicka, James Last, Muslim Magomayev, Paul Mauriat, Hazy Osterwald, Pesnyary, Edita Piekha, Franck Pourcel, Perez Prado, Alla Pugacheva, Eric Rogers, Earl Scruggs, Igor Sklyar, Terry Snyder, Stúdió 11, Mel Taylor, Klaus Wunderlich, Billy Vaughn, Helmut Zacharias, Zemlyane, Yuriy Antonov and Blue Effect.

The opening credits theme was edited from Vízisí (Water Ski), written by Hungarian composer Tamás Deák and performed Magyar Rádió Tánczenekara & Harmónia Vokál.

Sometimes the words of the songs were modified or altogether substituted to correspond to the action, and a New Year's holiday song (duet between Papanov and Rumyanova that later became a popular standard) was written especially for the series. Originally, the cult Russian singer/actor Vladimir Vysotsky was cast for the voice of Wolf, but the studio did not get the approval they needed from a Soviet state organization to use him. However, some homage to Vysotsky remains, as in the opening episode, Wolf is whistling his "Song of a Friend".

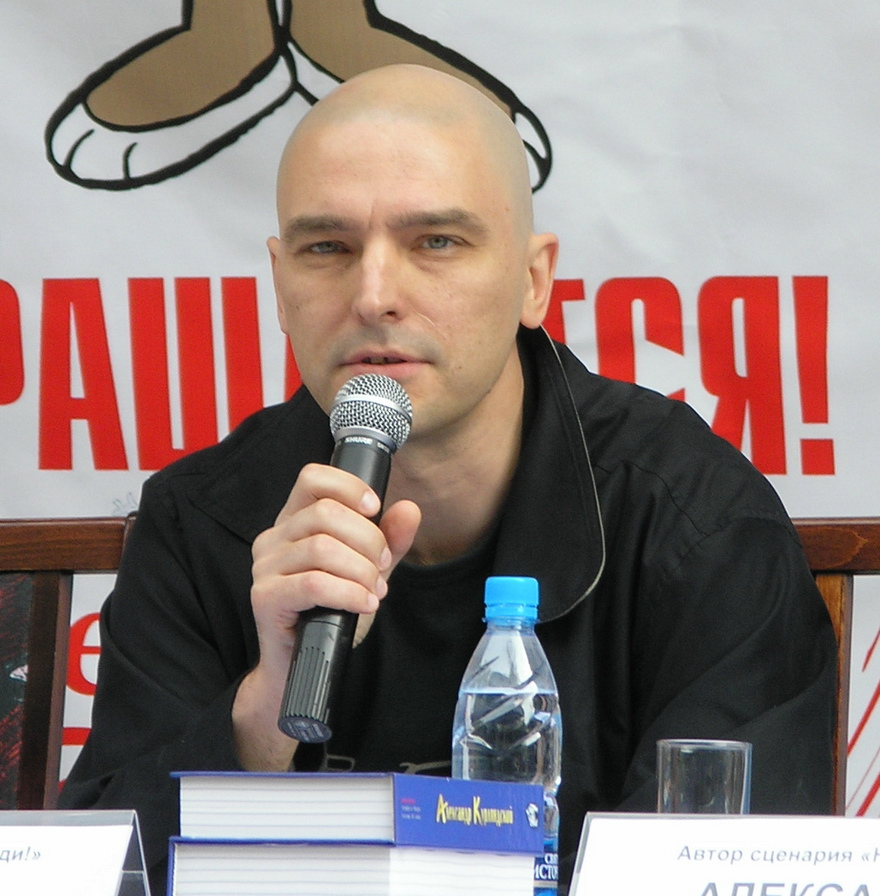
Andrei Derzhavin, keyboardist of Mashina Vremeni, wrote the musical score for the 19th and 20th episode.

When the 19th and 20th episode went into production, times had changed and the music rights would have to obtained first, which was not possible with the budget. A national artist, Andrei Derzhavin of the band Mashina Vremeni, was contacted instead, who composed the music for the films. The shorts also feature excerpts of preexisting Mashina Vremeni works.

=== Soundtrack ===
Episode 1 – "The Beach"

- Song about a Friend [Песня о друге]
- Last Electric Train [Последняя электричка]

Episode 2 – "The Fairground at Night"

- Ferris Wheel [Чёртово колесо] (Muslim Magomaev)
- The Laughing Hussar (Hazy Osterwald-Sextett)
- A song about Hares [Песня про зайцев]

Episode 3 – "Road and Construction Site"

- Kalinka (Orchester Günter Gollasch)
- В.Игнатьев — Карусель (Victor Ignatiev – Carousel)
- My Little Suede Shoes (Billy May)
- Entrance of the Gladiators (Julius Fučík)

Episode 4 – "The Stadium"

- King-Winner [Король-победитель]
- Cha-cha-cha, Jamaica (Vladimir Chizhik)
- Brass Orchestra [Orkiestry Dęte]

Episode 5 – "The City and the Train Station"

- By the Long Road [Дорогой длинною]
- O Sole Mio
- El Choclo

Episode 6 – "The Countryside"

- Yas was Mowing Clover [Касiў Ясь канюшыну] (Pesnyary)
- Jujalarim (Sugra)
- Sabre Dance [Танец с саблями] (Aram Khachaturian)
- At the Kolkhoz Poultry Farm [На колхозной птицеферме] (Mescherin Ensemble)

Episode 7 – "The Sea Voyage"

- Only Us [Только мы] (Edita Piekha & VIA Friendship)
- Boat Dance
- Balaton (Stúdió 11)
- Toy [Игрушка] (Victor Ignatiev)

Episode 8 – "The New Year Celebration"

- Snow Maiden [Снегурочка]
- Joker (Orchester Günter Gollasch)
- A Banda (Herb Alpert & The Tijuana Brass)
- John Grey [Джон Грей] (Matvei Blanter)
- La Cumparsita
- The Little Song is Going Round in a Circle [Ходит песенка по кругу] (Oscar Feltsman, Melodiya Ensemble)

Episode 9 – "The TV Studio"

- Little Man (Franck Pourcel)
- Tired Toys are Sleeping [Спят усталые игрушки] (Oleg Anofriev)
- A Priest had a Dog [У попа была собака]
- Caravan Twist – Bill Haley & His Comets
- Wheels (The String Alongs)
- The Football March

Episode 10 – "The Construction Site"

- Kazachok [Casatschok] (including Katyousha verse) (Dmitri Dourakine)
- Popcorn I [Воздушная кукуруза I] (Gershon Kingsley)
- Blue is the Night (Terry Snyder and the All Stars)
- Strip Tease in Rhythm (Helmut Zacharias)
- Jolly March of the Builders [Весёлый марш монтажников] (Nikolai Rybnikov)
- Meetings (Klavdiya Shulzhenko)

Episode 11 – "The Circus"

- Entrée March from Circus – Isaak Dunayevsky
- Easy Livin' Coming Closer PopCorn (James Last)
- Trompeten Muckel (James Last)
- Spinning Wheel (Ted Heath Orchestra)

Episode 12 – "The Museum"

- Lotto-Zahlen (Klaus Wunderlich)
- Corn Flakes (Klaus Wunderlich)
- Drums A-Go-Go
- Zorba [Зорба]
- Onde Del Danubio
- Triumphal March – Helmut Zacharias

Episode 13 – "The Olympic Games"

- Flight of the Bumblebee (Hummelflug) [Полёт шмеля] (Klaus Wunderlich arrangement)
- Cannonball (Pete Tex)
- How High the Moon (James Last)
- Dolannes Melody
- Moliendo Cafe (Perez Prado and His Orchestra)
- Train Forty-Five

Episode 14 – "The Nu-Tech House"

- Petersburger Nächte (Hugo Strasser)
- Besame Mucho (Klaus Wunderlich)
- Million Alyh Roz (Alla Pugacheva)
- Grass by the Home [Трава у дома] [Trava u Doma] – Zemlyane
- Get Up Action (Digital Emotion)
- Go Go Yellow Screen (Digital Emotion)
- Bavarian Affair (The Black Hole) – Empire (Methusalem)
- The Beauty and the Beast (Digital Emotion)
- Shaky Railcar [Качается вагон]

Episode 15 – "The House of Culture"

- Iceberg [Айсберг]
- Swan Lake – Dance of the swans – Tchaikovsky
- Beneath the Roof of Your House [Под крышей дома твоего] (Yuri Antonov)

Episode 16 – "In the World of Russian Folk Tales"

- Sea, Sea [Море, море] (Yuri Antonov)
- Green Light [Зелёный свет]
- Komarovo [Комарово]

Episode 17 – "Exotic Land on Island"

- Korobushka [Korobeiniki]
- Don't Put Salt in my Wounds [Не сыпь мне соль на рану]
- Lambada – Kaoma
- March of Stalin's air force [Марш сталинской авиации]

Episode 18 – "Supermarket"

- Taganka [Таганка] – Shufutinsky [Шуфутинский]
- On the Hills of Manchuria [На сопках Маньчжурии]
- Hafanana (Afric Simone)

Episode 19 – "Airport and Beach"

- Marionetka (Марионетка)

Episode 20 – "Dacha Community"

- Chocolate Hare (Шоколадный заяц)

Episode 21 – "New Year"

- Good mood (Хорошее настроение)

== Video games ==
Nu, pogodi! has been adapted into a number of video games. In 1984, an LCD game titled Nu, pogodi! was released in the Soviet Union. Between 2002 and 2010, the Russian video game company SoftClub released five different PC games based on the cartoon series.

Game	Details
Nu, pogodi! (Ну, погоди!) 1984 – LCD game	Notes: LCD game Nu, pogodi!: Released under the Electronika brand. It is an unlicensed clone of Egg, a title in Nintendo's Game & Watch line. The Wolf takes the role of the original wolf character, whilst the Hare replaces the cock.
Wait and See! 1997 – Dendy	Notes: Wait and See is a platform game loosely based on Nu, Pogodi! It was released in 1997 for the Dendy line of NES clones by a Chinese company called Dragon Co. It features Bugs Bunny in place of Hare and Wile E. Coyote in place of Wolf.; The game is infamous for its game over screen, which features Wolf eating Hare.
Nu, pogodi! Vypusk 1: Pogonya (Ну, погоди! Выпуск 1: Погоня) 5 April 2002 – PC	Notes: Platform game / Beat 'em up; Developed and published by SoftClub.; The title translates to "Well, Just You Wait! Part 1: Chase".
Nu, pogodi! Vypusk 2: Kruglyy schot (Ну, погоди! Выпуск 2: Круглый счёт) 17 May 2002 – PC	Notes: Puzzle game; Developed by K-D Lab and published by SoftClub.; The title translates to "Well, Just You Wait! Part 2: Round Score".
Nu, pogodi! Vypusk 3: Pesnya dlya zaytsa (Ну, погоди! Выпуск 3: Песня для зайца) 11 December 2003 – PC	Notes: Adventure game; Developed by K-D Lab and published by SoftClub.; The title translates to "Well, Just You Wait! Part 3: Song for the Hare".
Nu, pogodi! Vypusk 4: Dogonyalki (Ну, погоди! Выпуск 4: Догонялки) 20 May 2005 – PC	Notes: Platform game; Developed by DiP Interactive and published by SoftClub.; The title translates to "Well, Just You Wait! Part 4: Tag".
Nu, pogodi! Vypusk 5: Po sledam zaytsa (Ну, погоди! Выпуск 5: По следам зайца) 24 December 2010 – PC	Notes: Platform game / Beat 'em up; Developed by A. Yefremov and published by SoftClub.; The title translates to "Well, Just You Wait! Part 5: On the Trail of the Hare".

== Remake ==
In 2019, Soyuzmultfilm announced an upcoming remake of Nu, Pogodi. Volk and Zayats were given new designs and three new characters were introduced; Ulya the Roe Deer, Shu the Hedgehog, and Tim the Badger. One of the only living original creators, Felix Kandel, expressed his displeasure at seeing the remake and offered to pay the studio to not release it. The political party Communists of Russia requested that the State Duma ban Soyuzmultfilm from making the remake. Soyuzmultfilm planned to release the remake in winter 2020, but was forced to delay several times and announced finally a release of winter 2021. The series was made of 26 7-minute episodes and a second season in works for a future release. The series got modernized for a younger demographic and audience. It also received an English dub under the title I'll Get You! Holidays.

The first episode was released on 17 December 2021, to mass negative reviews. Episodes are available online as well.

== See also ==
- History of Russian animation
- Hare and Wolf
