= Aleksandr Kurlyandsky =

Russian writer (1938–2020)

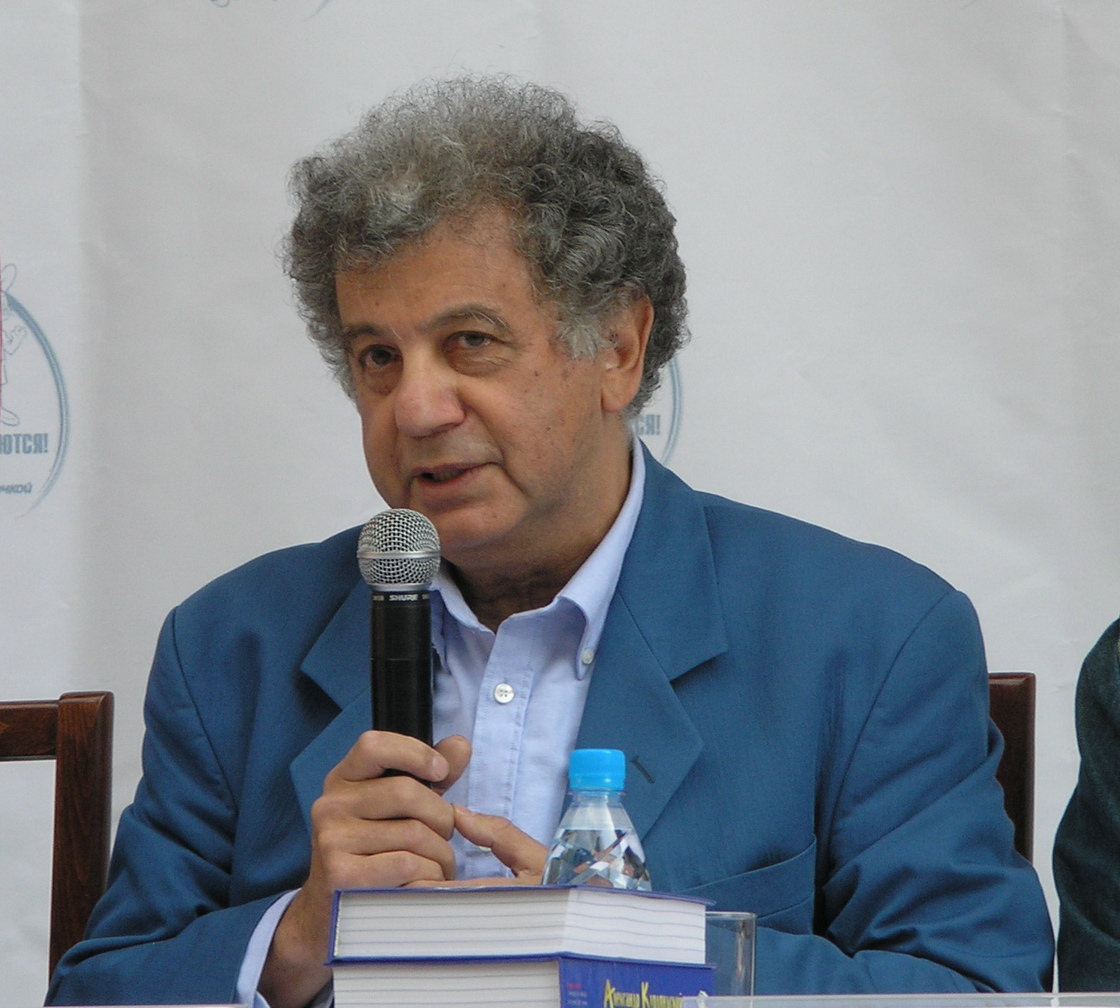
- Kurlyandsky in 2005
- Born: Aleksandr Yefimovich Kurlyandsky; 1 July 1938; Moscow, USSR
- Died: 21 December 2020 (aged 82); Moscow, Russia
- Occupations: Screenwriter; author; satirist; playwright
- Years active: 1967–2006; 2012–2020
- Notable work: Well, Just You Wait! Baba Yaga is against! The Return of the Prodigal Parrot

Aleksandr Yefimovich Kurlyandsky (Russian: Алекса́ндр Ефи́мович Курля́ндский; 1 July 1938 – 21 December 2020) was a Soviet and Russian writer, satirist, playwright, screenwriter, and author of books for children.

== Biography ==
He was born and died in Moscow, and was an Honored Art Worker of the Russian Federation (2007). He was also awarded the USSR State Prize (1988).

He is the author of the scripts for the animated films Well, Just You Wait!, Baba Yaga is against!, Monk Little Dog and The Return of the Prodigal Parrot.
