= Gennady Khazanov =

Russian actor and comedian

Gennady Khazanov Геннадий Хазанов
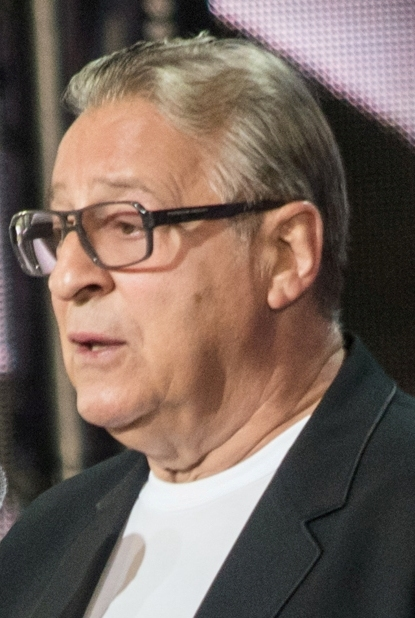
- Born: Gennady Viktorovich Khazanov; 1 December 1945 (age 80); Moscow, Russian SFSR, Soviet Union
- Occupations: Actor, humorist, parodist
- Years active: 1967–present
- Title: People’s Artist of the RSFSR (1991)
- Awards: Full cavalier of the Order "For Merit to the Fatherland"; Order of Friendship; State Prize of the Russian Federation (1995)
- Gennady Khazanov's voice Khaznaov's interview on the Echo of Moscow program, 15 November 2007

Gennady Viktorovich Khazanov (Russian: Геннадий Викторович Хазанов; born 1 December 1945) is a Russian stand-up comedian, actor and theatre manager.

== Career ==
His work includes parodies of Russian and Soviet politicians, and mockery of various sub-cultural groups in modern Russia.

After graduating from the Moscow Circus School in 1969, Khazanov worked as a master of ceremonies in Leonid Utyosov Orchestra.

He began his solo career in 1973 at Moscontsert, a Moscow state concert organization. He gained early success with monologues of a culinary school student written by Lion Izmailov and Iurii Volovich, and of a brave parrot who cannot stop telling the truth written by Arkady Khait.

In 1997, he became artistic director of the Moscow Variety Theatre. In 1999, he was president of the Security Foundation of the Russian Jewish Community, which was set up to coordinate action against antisemitism in Moscow.

He is an acquaintance of Russian President Vladimir Putin. In March 2014, he signed a letter in support of Putin's position on Russia's military intervention in Ukraine.

In 1992, during a rally, Vladimir Zhirinovsky told Khazanov: "Khazanov, an Israeli citizen, what are you doing here? Only traitors and scoundrels have dual citizenship and go against their own state."
