= Leonid Nosyrev =

Russian children's media creator (born 1937)

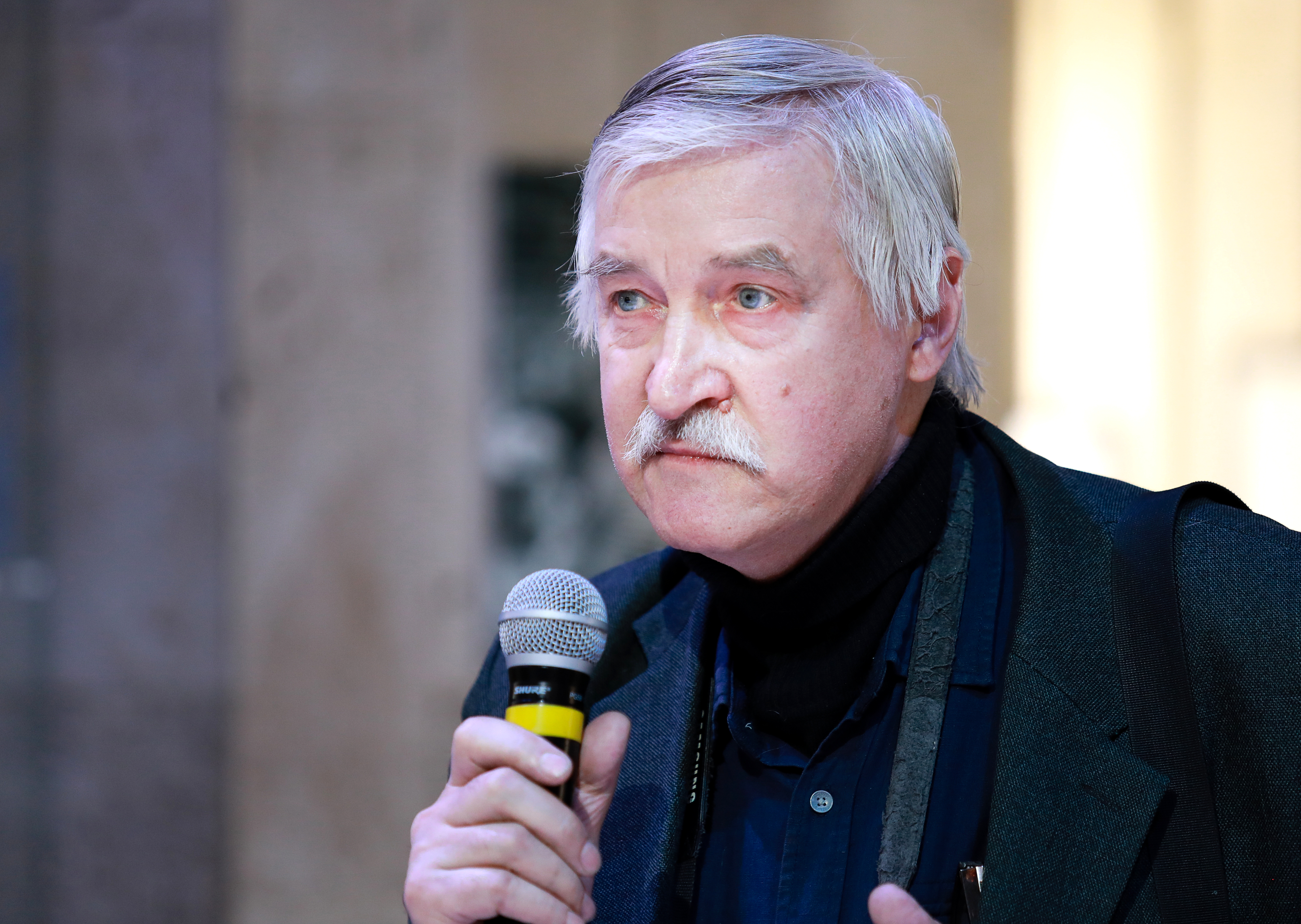
- Nosyrev in 2018
- Born: 22 January 1937 (age 89); Ivanteyevka, RSFSR, USSR
- Occupation: Animation director
- Years active: 1961–2003

Leonid Viktorovich Nosyrev (Russian: Леони́д Ви́кторович Но́сырев; born 22 January 1937, Ivanteyevka, Moscow Oblast) is a Soviet and Russian director-animator, screenwriter, artist, animator. He is a laureate of the Prize of the President of the Russian Federation in the field of literature and art for works for children and youth (2019), an Honored Art Worker of the Russian Federation (2003), and a winner of National Animation Awards (2020).

== Biography ==
In 1956, Nosyrev finished Fedoskino school of miniature painting. Upon further completion of the courses for animation artists at Soyuzmultfilm in 1961, he began to work at the studio. In 1975, he also graduated from the Moscow State University, specializing in the theory and history of art.

As a cartoonist, Nosyrev participated in the creation of various Soviet animated films, including The Story of a Crime (1962), Toptyzhka (1964), The Vacation of Boniface (1965), The Most, the Most, the Most, the Most (1966), The Glass Harmonica (1968), The Bremen Town Musicians (1969), and The Small Boat (1970).

In 1968, Nosyrev was promoted to a director at Soyuzmultfilm. He was also among the founders of Happy Merry-Go-Round film magazine. Since 1996, Nosyrev has been teaching at the Gerasimov Institute of Cinematography.
