= Arkady Khait =

Russian writer, satirist and screenwriter (1938–2000)

- Born: Arkady Iosifovich Khait; 25 December 1938; Moscow, USSR
- Died: 22 February 2000 (aged 61); Munich, Germany
- Occupations: Satirist; comedian; screenwriter
- Years active: 1968–2000
- Notable work: Well, Just You Wait!

Arkady Iosifovich Khait (Russian: Аркадий Иосифович Хайт; 25 December 1938 – 22 February 2000) was a Russian Jewish satire, comedy, song and script writer, and a comedian in his late years.

== Works ==
- Co-authoring scripts for Nu, pogodi! animated cartoon series
- Co-authoring scripts for Leopold the Cat animated cartoon series

== Awards ==
- 1991: Nika Award, for film Passport
- 1990: RSFSR State Prize
- 1998: People's Artist of the Russian Federation
- 1985: USSR State Prize for works of literature and arts for children
