= M13 Fights =

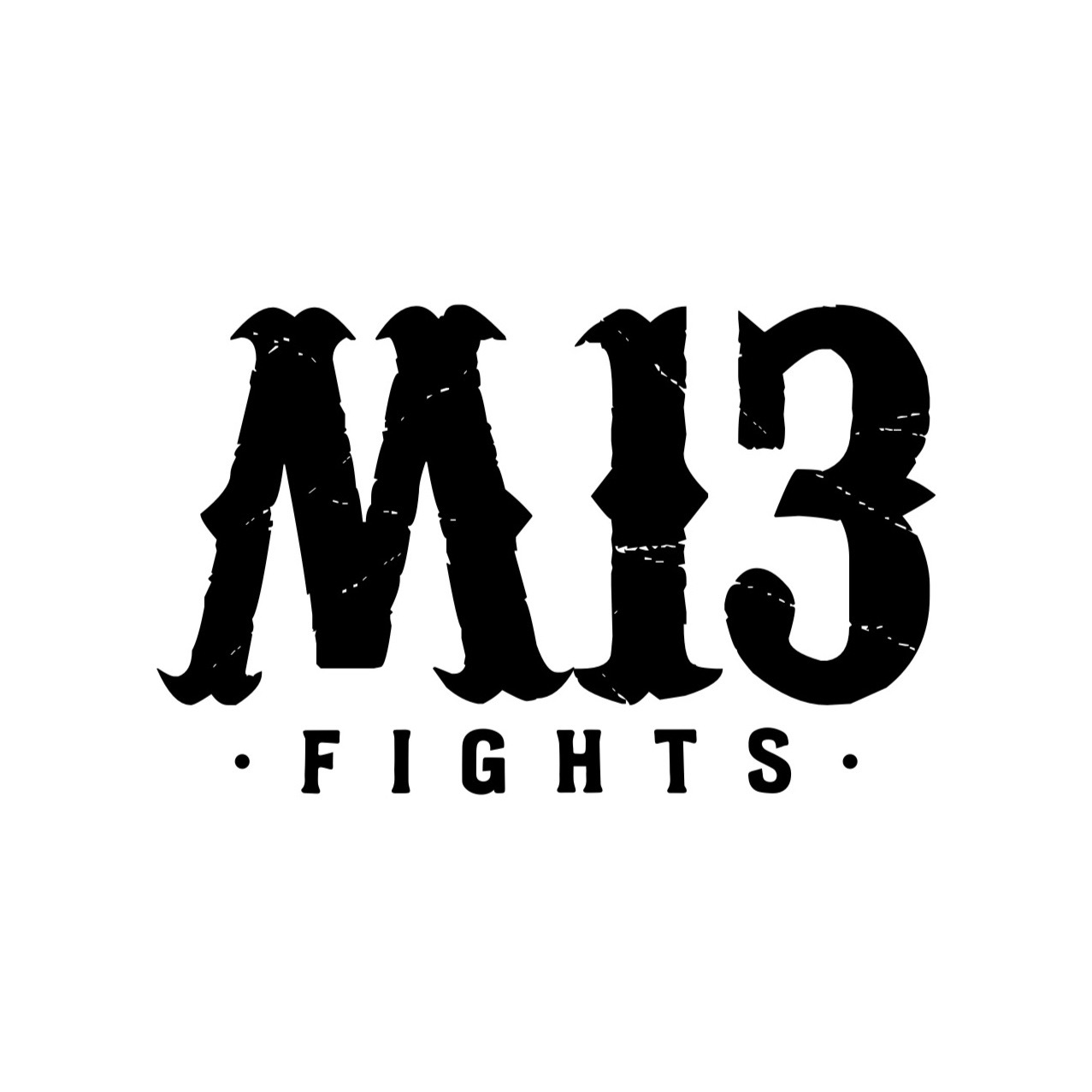
- Sport: Bare-knuckle boxing, boxing, K-1, medieval combat
- Founded: 2025
- Founder: Artem Grot
- No. of teams: Individual competitors (active military personnel and veterans of the Ukrainian Defense Forces)
- Country: Ukraine
- Most recent champion: No permanent champion (tournament winners)

M13 Fights (stylized as M13 FIGHTS) is a Ukrainian combat sports league that organizes bare-knuckle boxing and other martial arts events for active-duty service members and veterans of the Armed Forces of Ukraine. It was founded in 2025 by Special Operations Forces veteran Artem Grot as an initiative of the MEMORIA MMC veterans motorcycle club. The tournaments are designed for psychological rehabilitation, strengthening camaraderie among defenders, and promoting strength through sport. Participation is open exclusively to military personnel and veterans, including amputees and former prisoners of war.

== History ==
The idea for the league originated during gatherings of the MEMORIA MMC motorcycle club, when participants decided to organize informal bare-knuckle fights “in the backyard”. The first public tournament took place on 21 June 2025 in Kyiv at the MEMORIA MMC base. The event drew around 500 spectators and featured 10 bouts, with commentary provided by professional boxers Denys Berinchyk and Dmytro Lazutkin.

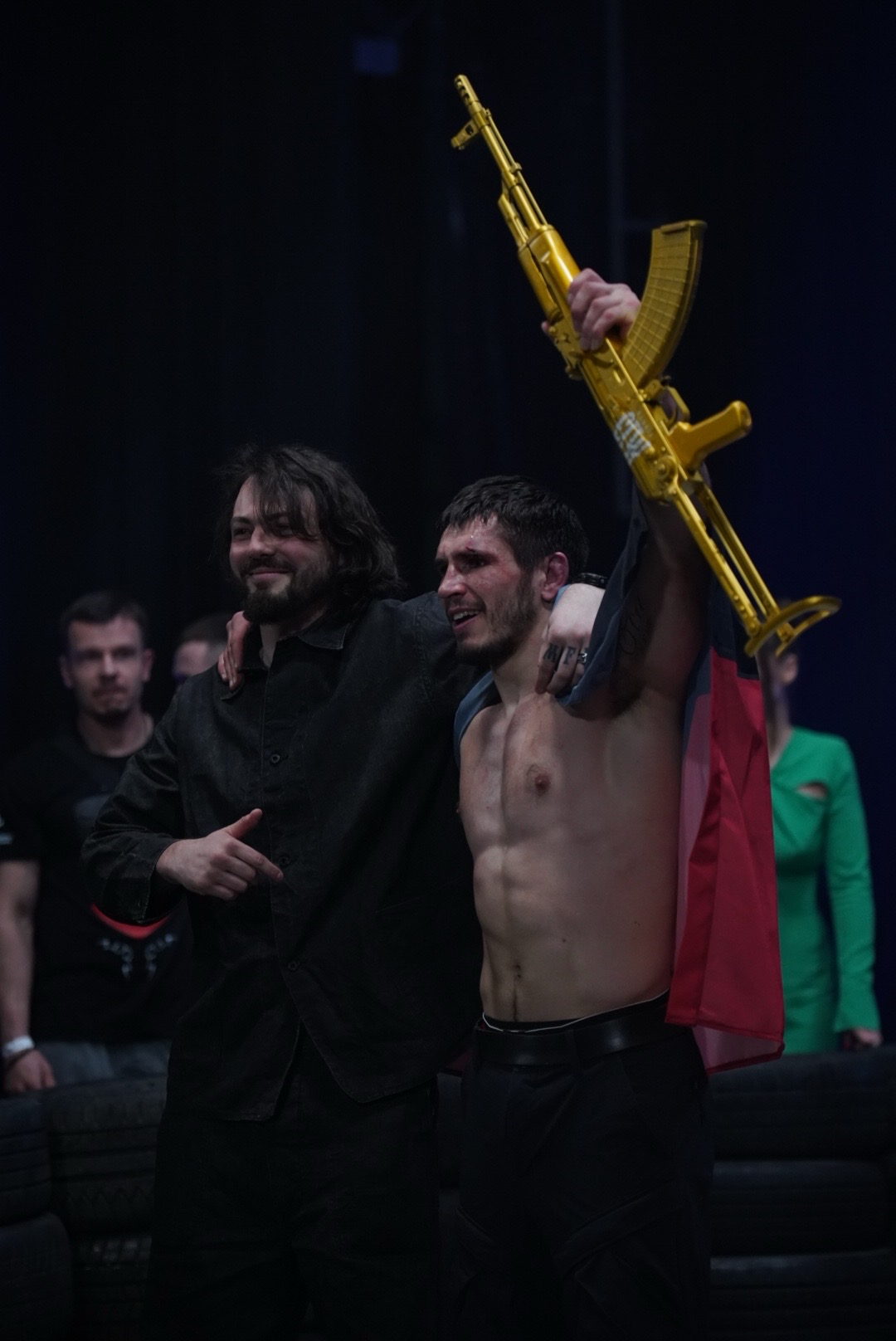
Artem Grot during a bare-knuckle fighting tournament among military personnel organized by M13 Fights in Khmelnytskyi, 2026

By March 2026, at least four tournaments had been held: the first was open to the public, the second and third were closed events, and the fourth was a large open tournament held at Kyivska Rus’ Park near Kyiv, attracting approximately 2,000 spectators. One of the guests at a closed tournament was Kyrylo Budanov, Head of the Office of the President of Ukraine. Tournaments are held regularly, with plans for one or two events per month. The events are livestreamed on the official M13 Fights YouTube channel.

== Format and rules ==
The league is positioned as a sporting festival rather than purely competitive bouts. The core format is bare-knuckle boxing (without gloves). Additional disciplines include traditional boxing, K-1 kickboxing, and medieval armored combat (knight fights with swords and full armor).

Participants are service members and veterans with real combat experience from elite units such as the Tymur Special Unit of the Defence Intelligence of Ukraine, the Azov Brigade, Kraken Regiment, the Khartiia Brigade, and others. The league includes amputee veterans and former prisoners of war. Emphasis is placed on character, willpower, and brotherhood rather than professional athletic standards.

== Purpose and impact ==
M13 Fights forms part of a wider veteran ecosystem developed by the MEMORIA MMC motorcycle club. Its core values include honoring fallen heroes, psychological rehabilitation, and transitioning from donation dependency to independent veteran-led projects.

The tournaments support the Tymur Special Unit of the Defence Intelligence of Ukraine.

== Gallery ==
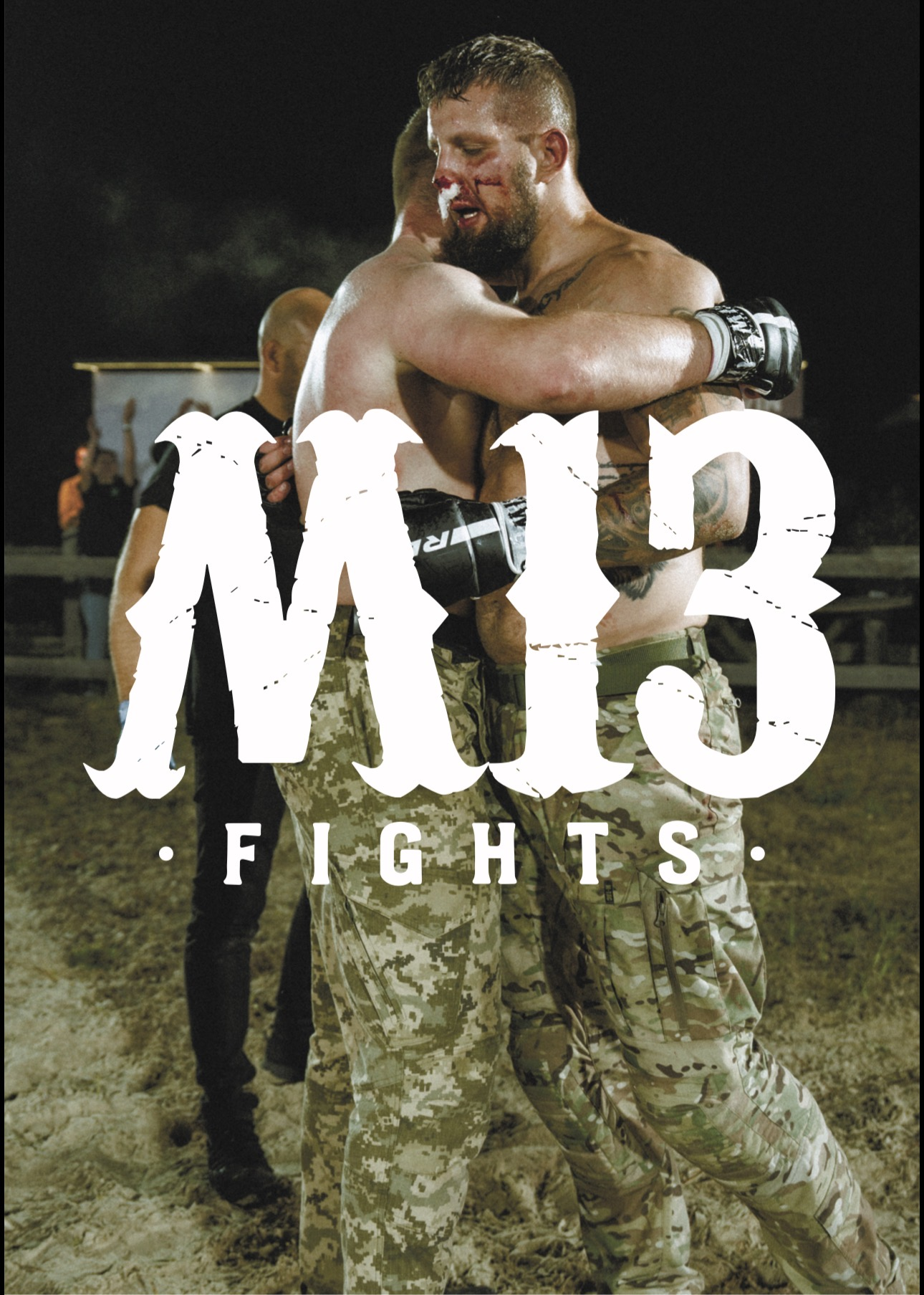

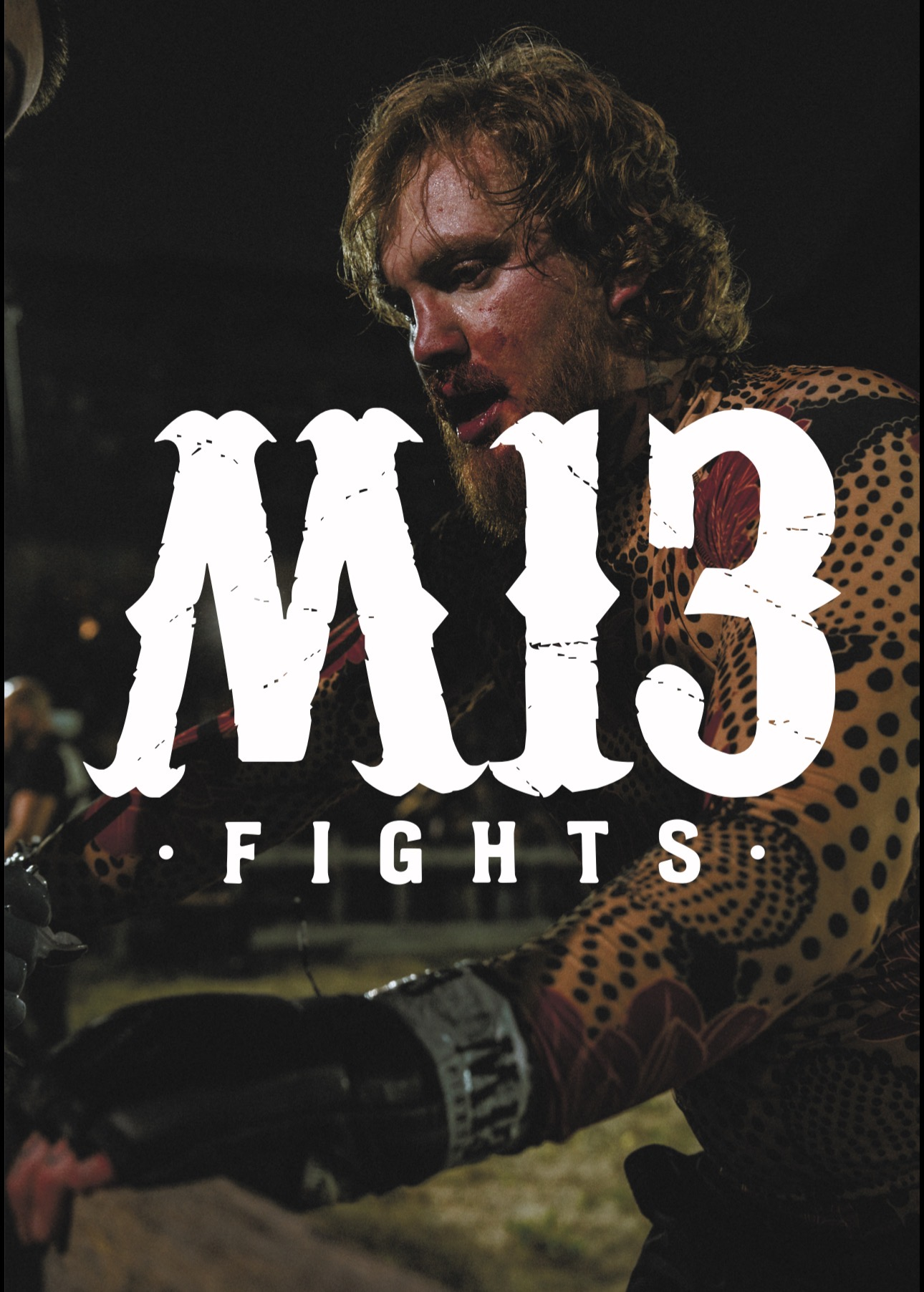

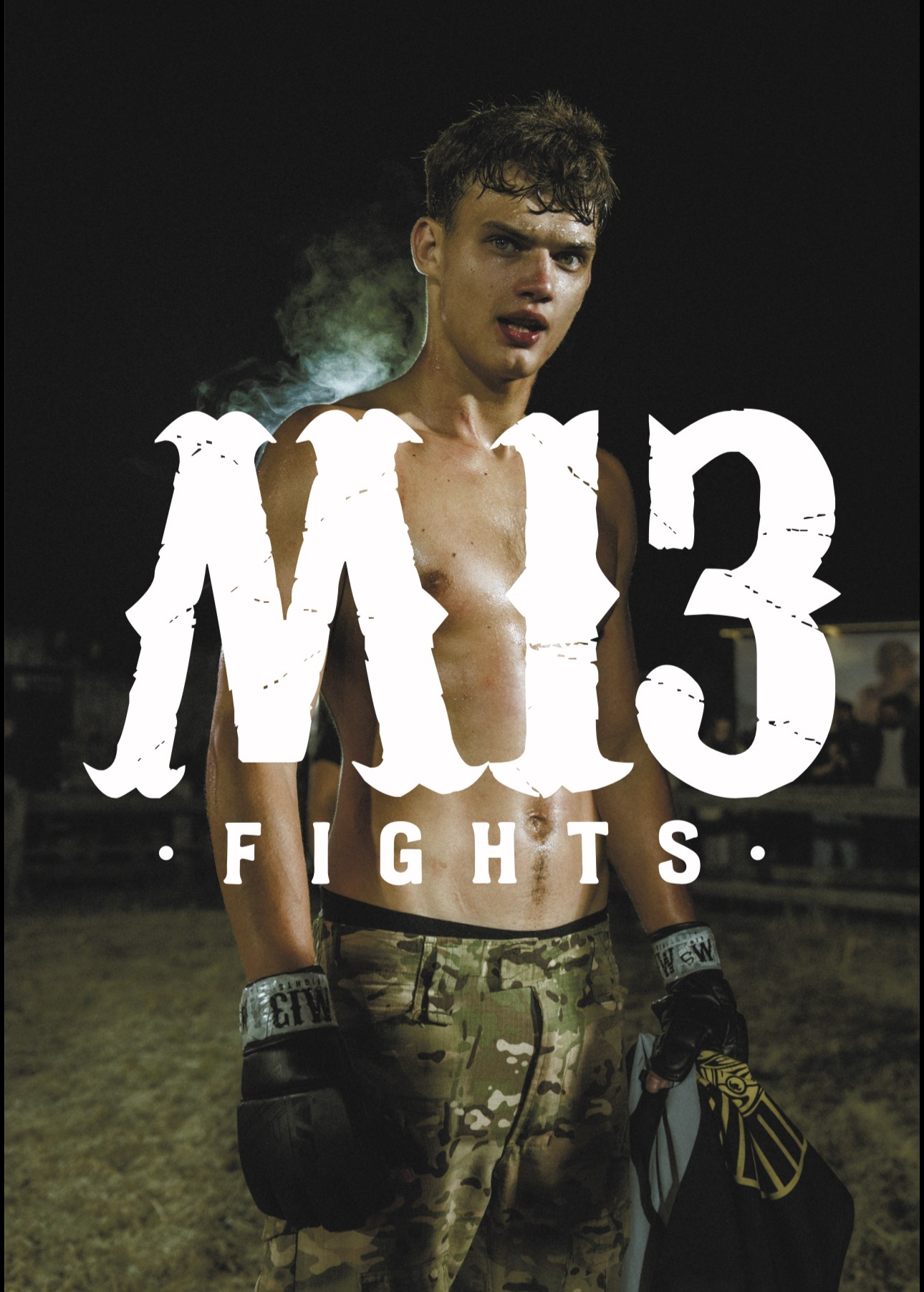

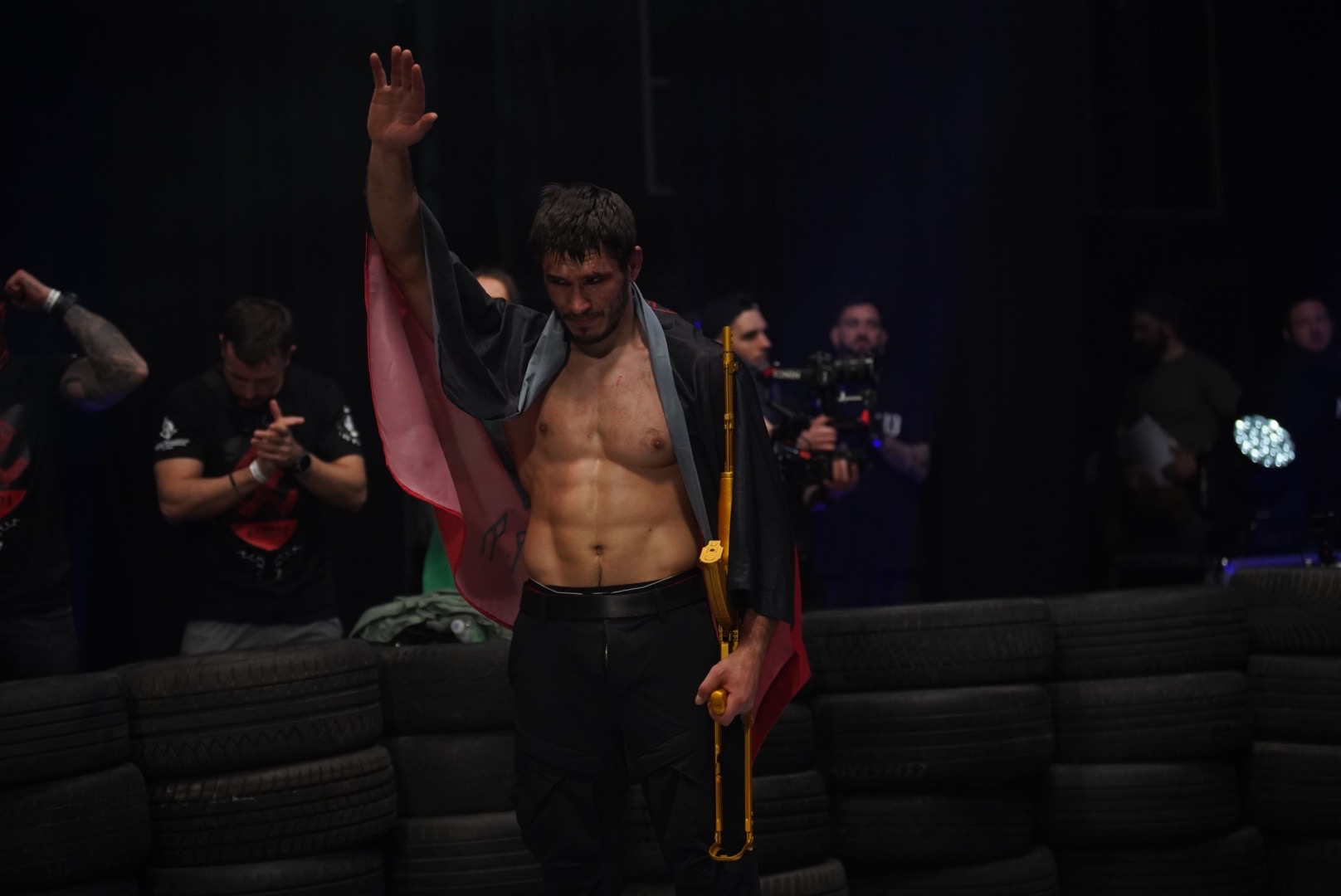

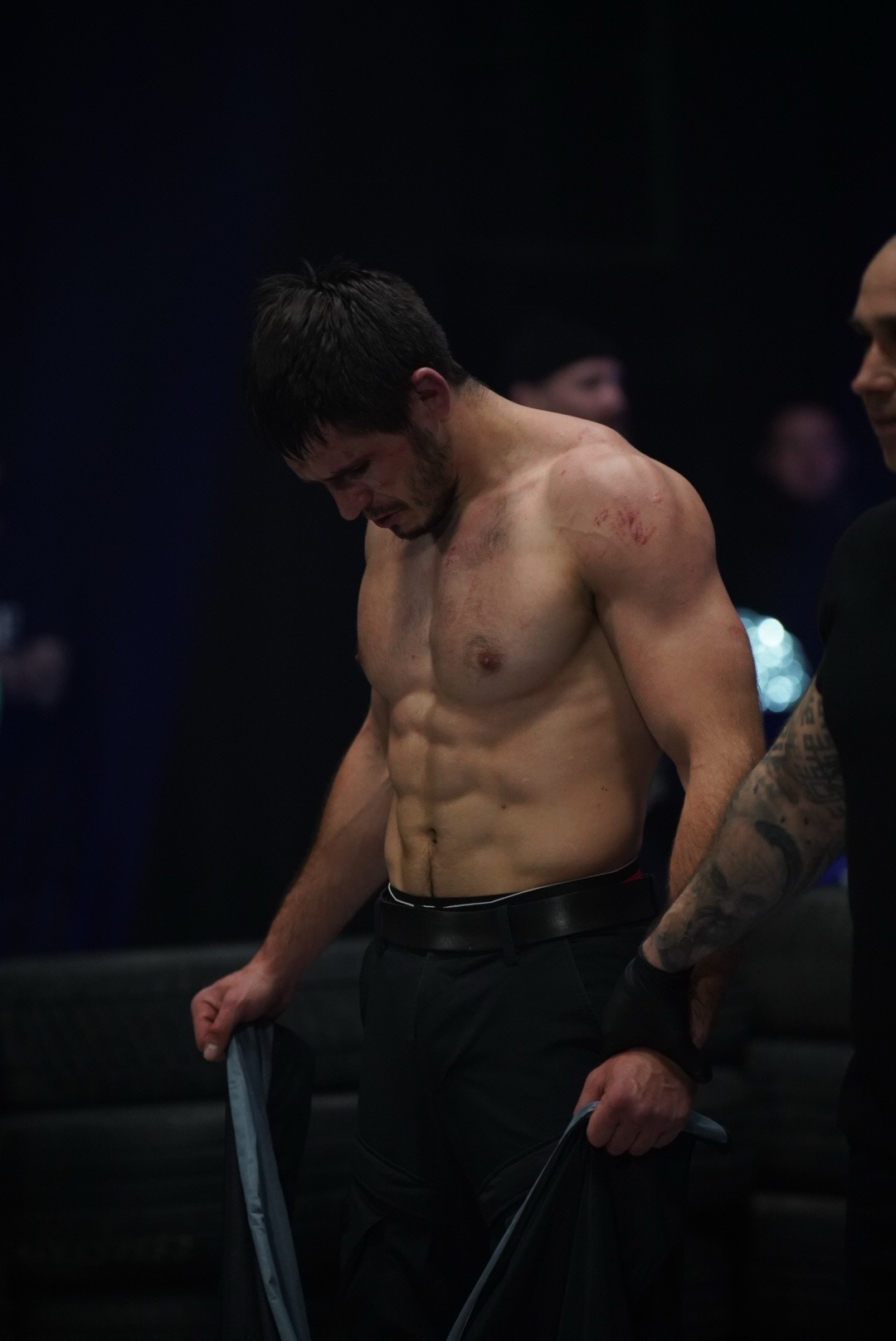

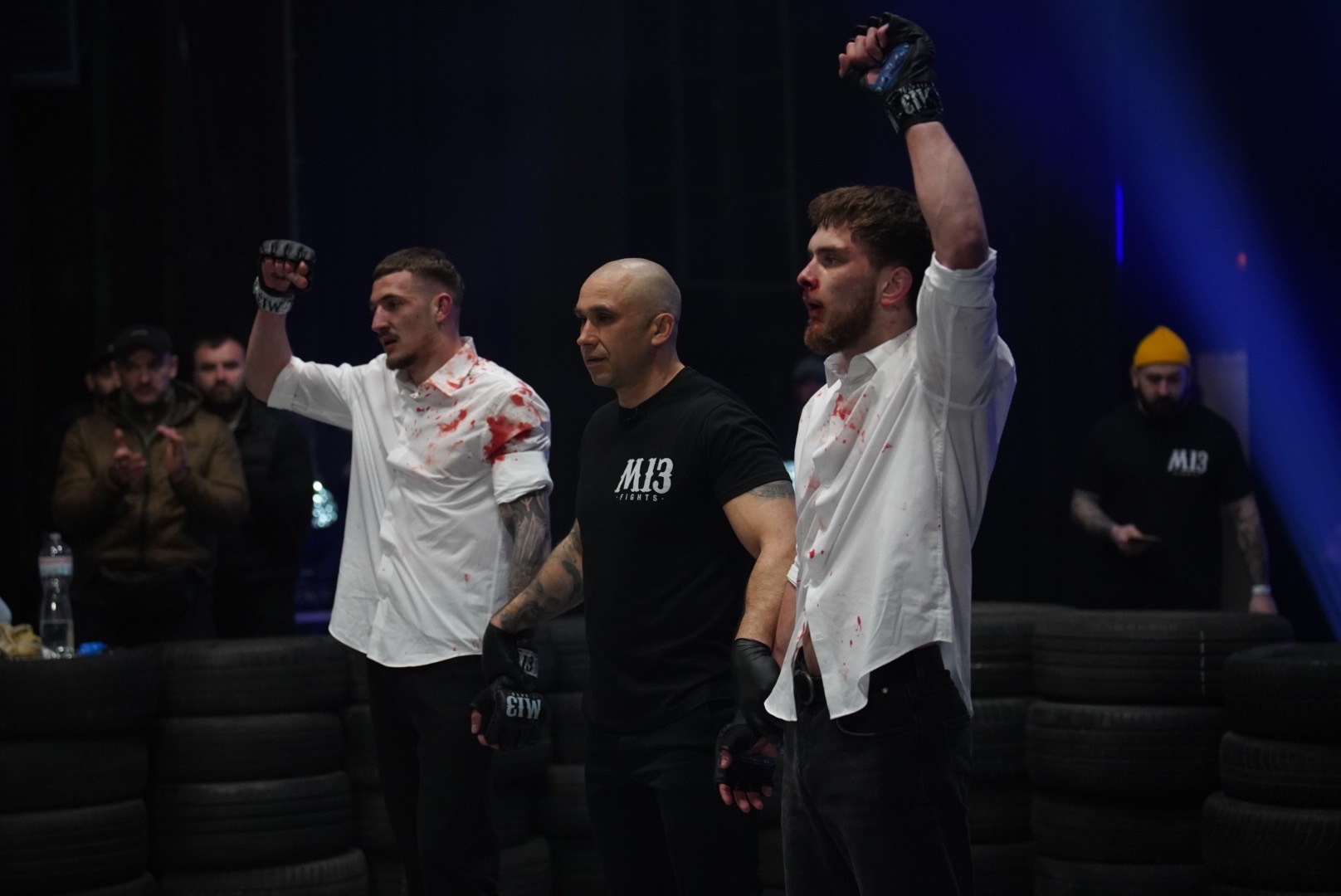
