= Lviv Polytechnic =

Public university in Lviv, Ukraine

Coordinates: 49°50′08″N 24°00′53″E

Lviv Polytechnic National University
- Lviv Polytechnic coat of arms
- Motto: Litteris et artibus (Latin)
- Type: Public
- Established: 1816; 210 years ago (as Technical Academy)
- Affiliations: Ministry of Education and Science of Ukraine
- Academic affiliations: European University Association, Association of Ukrainian Universities
- Chancellor: Natalia Shakhovska
- Rector: Natalia Shakhovska
- Students: ~35,000
- Location: Lviv, Lviv Oblast, Ukraine
- Website: Official website
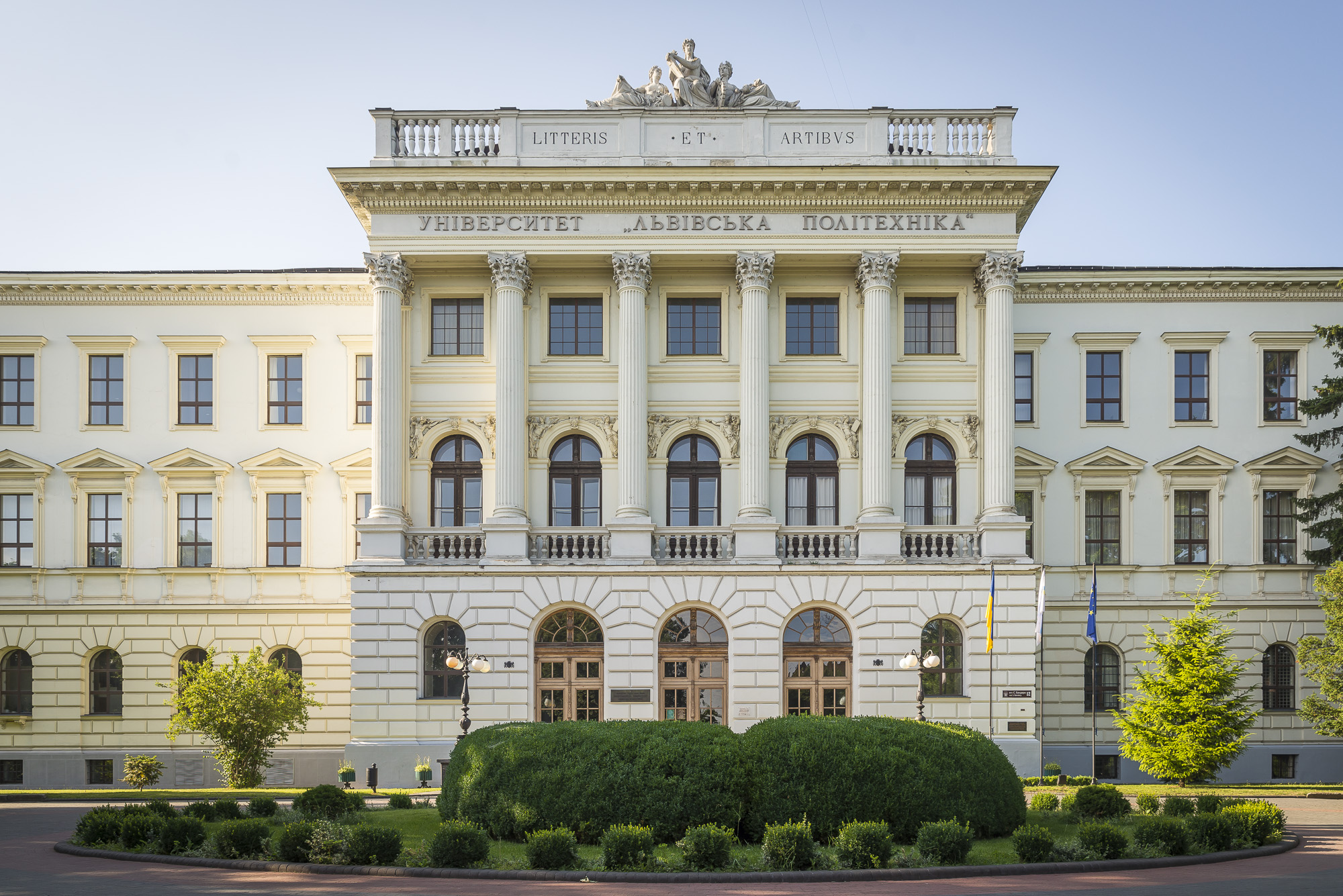

Immovable Monument of National Significance of Ukraine
- Official name: Головний навчальний корпус Львівської політехніки (Main academic building of the Lviv Polytechnic)
- Type: Architecture
- Reference no.: 130046

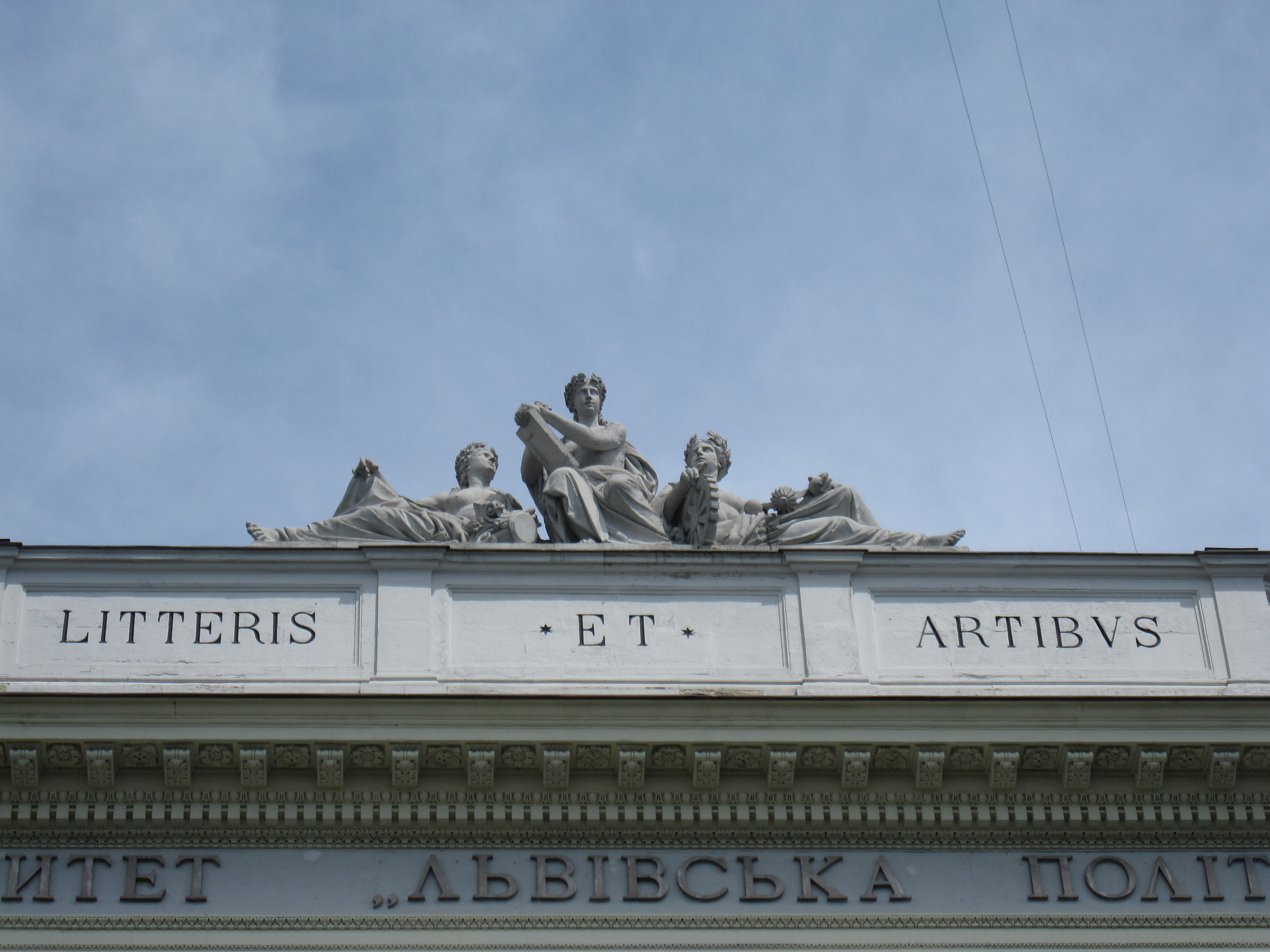
The main building is crowned with allegorical statues and the Latin inscription Litteris et Artibus

The Lviv Polytechnic National University (Ukrainian: Національний університет «Львівська політехніка») is a public university in Lviv, Ukraine, founded in 1816. According to the Times Higher Education, as of 2024, it ranks first as a technical institution of higher education and second among all institutions of higher education after Sumy State University in Ukraine. Lviv Polytechnic is also the largest educational institution in Ukraine by the number of students and one of the largest by the number of faculties and departments.

Lviv Polytechnic National University is one of the top public universities in Lviv, Ukraine. It is ranked #1001-1200 in QS World University Rankings 2026.

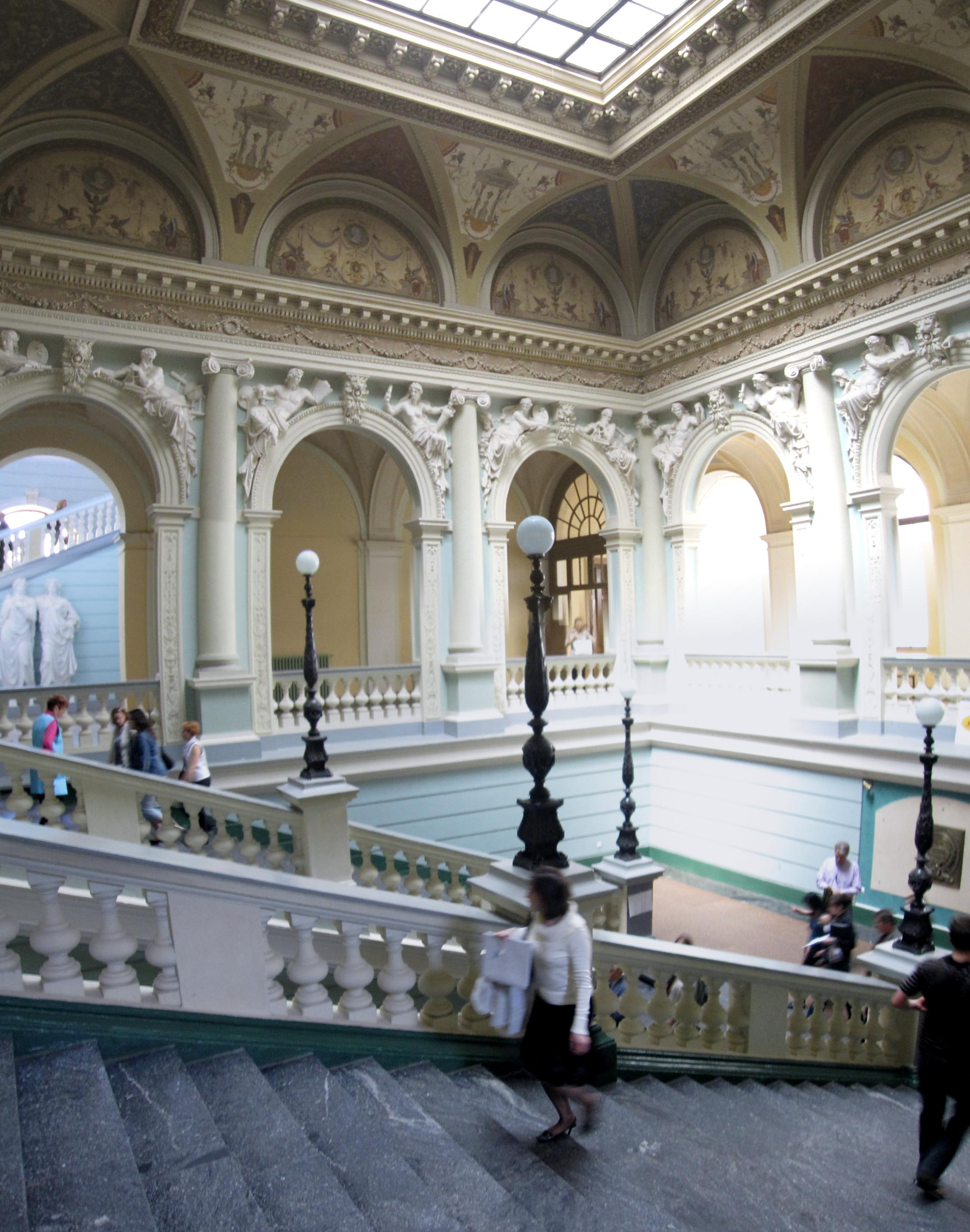
Interior main staircase of Lviv Polytechnic

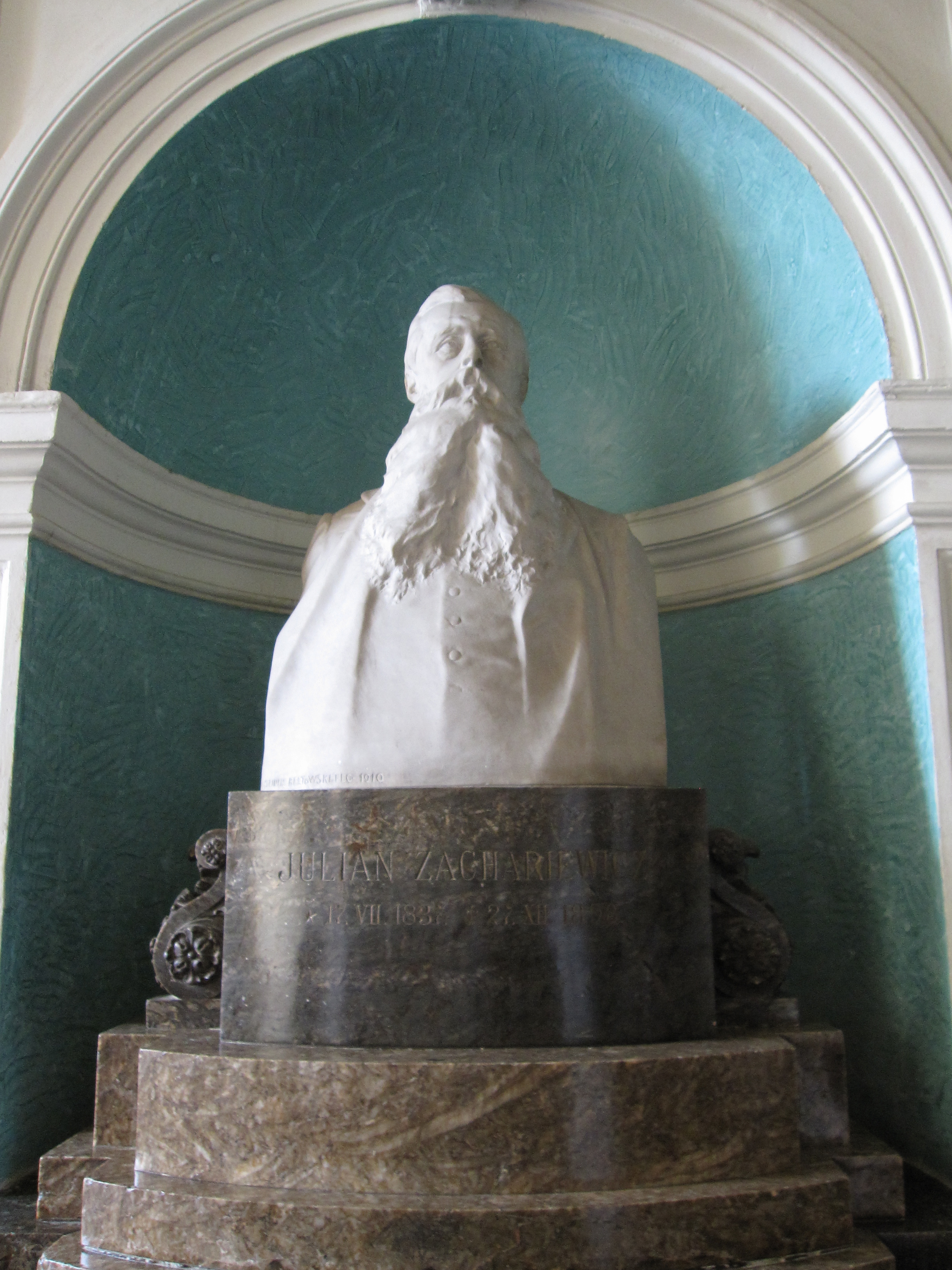
Marble bust of Julian Zachariewicz at the entrance of the main building

== History ==
The history of the Lviv Polytechnic National University begins during the Austrian Empire, and extends through the Second Polish Republic, the Nazi German Occupation, the Soviet Union, and into independent Ukraine.

On 7 March 1816, the Imperial-Royal Real School was opened in Lemberg (Lviv). A technical school was established with the help of the newly introduced local industrial tax. In the curricula of the Imperial-Royal School, the main focus was assigned to the subjects of the natural-mathematical cycle, drawing, drawing and the study of new modern languages. The educational process was based on German educational programs that were adapted to local requirements. The newly created School was housed in a beautiful building at number 20 on the then-current Piekarska Street (now Virmenska).

In 1825, according to the Royal Decree of the Austrian Emperor Franz I, the three-level Imperial-Royal Real School was reorganised into the Imperial-Royal School of Technical Sciences and Trade in Lviv.

In 1835, the School of Technical Sciences and Trade turned into the Imperial-Royal Real-Trade Academy in Lviv. Here in 1841 the technical faculty was opened.

In 1844, in the house of Darowski, on the present Armenian street, 2, the Imperial-Royal Technical Academy was opened in Lviv with technical and trade departments (faculties). It was one of the first academic technical schools in Europe and the first in Ukraine. In 1877, at the start of a new academic year, under the leadership of the new rector Julian Zachariewicz, construction began of a new building to the academy (in the present Stepan Bandera street). Julian Zachariewicz was also an accomplished architect, and designed this building, based on the 1820s Technical University in Vienna, and the chemical laboratory.

At the same time, the academy was renamed Polytechnic School and included in the academic schools of the Austro-Hungarian Empire .

On 10 July 1912, Maria Sklodowska-Curie delivered a lecture at the Lviv Polytechnic School, and on the same day, she received the title of Honorary Doctor of Technical Sciences. Her name was commemorated on the honorary board of doctors honoris causa of Lviv Polytechnic.

Since 1921 the institution has been called "Politechnika Lwowska", and since 1939 - Lviv Polytechnic Institute.

In June 1993, one year before the celebration of its 150th anniversary, the Lviv Polytechnic Institute received the highest - the fourth - the level of accreditation, the status of the university and the name of the State University "Lviv Polytechnic" . In 2000 the Polytechnic received the status of a national university.

On 8 July 2009, the Cabinet of Ministers of Ukraine, at its meeting, granted the National University "Lviv Polytechnic" the status of a self-governing research national higher educational institution.

In October 2017, the Tech StartUp School Business Innovation Center officially opened at Lviv Polytechnic National University with the aim of facilitating startups and innovations as well as providing students with business mentoring programs.

In May 2018 the IoT lab designed for students was established in the university with the support of Lviv IT Cluster organization.

=== Austrian Empire ===
In 1817, the Austrian Empire opened a secondary technical school in Lemberg, divided into a technical school and a commercial school. However, the official change to a technical academy began in 1844, as noted in the following timeline:

- 4 November 1844: The school was upgraded to the Technical Academy Lemberg. Its first director was Austrian Florian Schindler, former director of the Technical College in Brünn (Brno). The building was situated at the corner of Virmenska and Teatralna streets in the building of Darowski. The school had two departments – technical and commercial. Education lasted three years.
- 1 November 1848: During the Revolutions of 1848, the town's center was shelled by the Austrian artillery of General Wilhelm Hammerstein. The building of the technical academy was destroyed by fire. Lectures were held in the town municipality building (3rd floor) and continued there till 1850.
- 4 December 1850: Studies resume in the newly restored building.
- 1851: The number of students at the technical academy was 220, out of which 98 were Polish, 50 Jewish, 48 German, 19 Ukrainian/Ruthenian, 4 Czech and 2 Hungarian. In the same year, professor Wawrzyniec Zmurko (graduate of the Vienna Polytechnic) became director of the Department of Mathematics, as the first Pole in the history of the school. Zmurko is considered as founder of the Lwów School of Mathematics.
- 1852/1853: The beginning of the academy reorganization, which was suggested by Josef Weiser. He wanted the academy to be modelled after Paris Polytechnic, with two-level education.
- 1857–1868: Rudolf Günsberg was the assistant of chemistry and the assistant professor of technological chemistry.
- 1870: A Decree of Emperor Franz Joseph I of Austria established Polish as the official language of the school. Most professors who were not proficient in Polish left the Polytechnic.
- 1872: The Ministry of Affairs of Religions and Education gave permission to teach chemical technologies. Rudolf Günsberg started as the full professor of applied chemistry.
- 12 March 1872: Professor of physics Feliks Strzelecki was elected as the first rector.
- 1 April 1874 – October 1877: Academy obtained permission to build new academic premises. Julian Zachariewicz was elected as the construction superintendent. He ordered that the facade of the building be modelled after the building of the Munich Polytechnic.
- 7 October 1877: The first telephone conversation on the territory of the Austro-Hungarian Empire took place, followed by a lecture of Doctor Roman Gostkowski. The Telephone line connected the assembly hall of the main building with the premises of the Department of Technical Chemistry.
- 15 November 1877: Inauguration of the new rector – professor of architecture Julian Zachariewicz. On the same day, consecration of newly constructed school's building took place, carried out by three Lvov's archbishops - Roman Catholic, Greek-Catholic and Armenian-Catholic and witnessed by Governor of Galicia, Alfred Potocki.
- 1877: Technical academy was renamed to Polytechnical School (Technische Hochschule). However, the rector as well as other professors refrained from using a German-sounding name, and insisted on calling it in Polish Szkola Politechniczna.
- 13 September 1880: Emperor Franz Joseph I visited the polytechnical school. During that visit he ordered Jan Matejko to depict the technical progress of mankind in 11 pictures. Now these pictures decorate the assembly hall. The Emperor signed a guest book in Polish; the book is now kept in Wrocław.

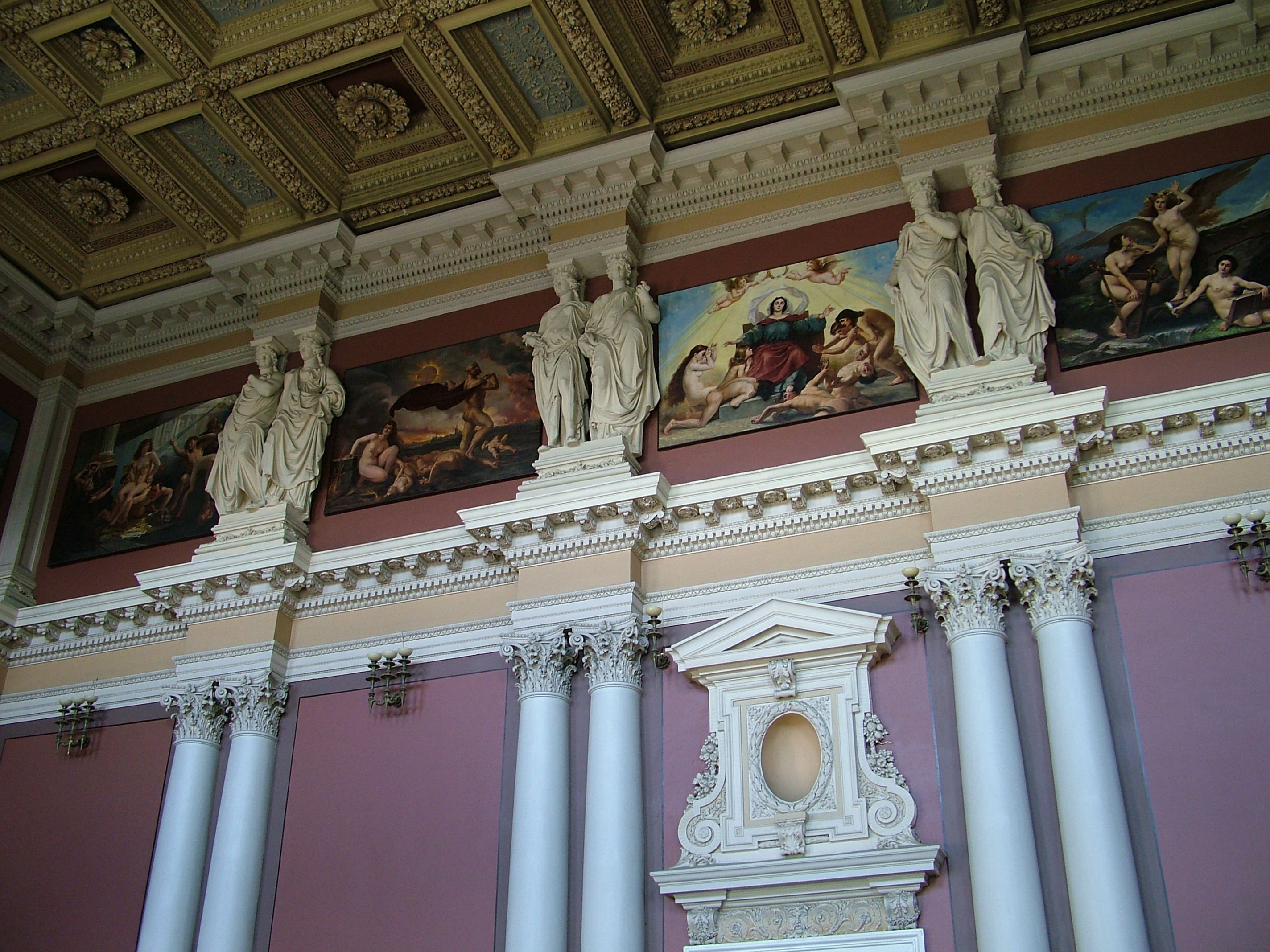
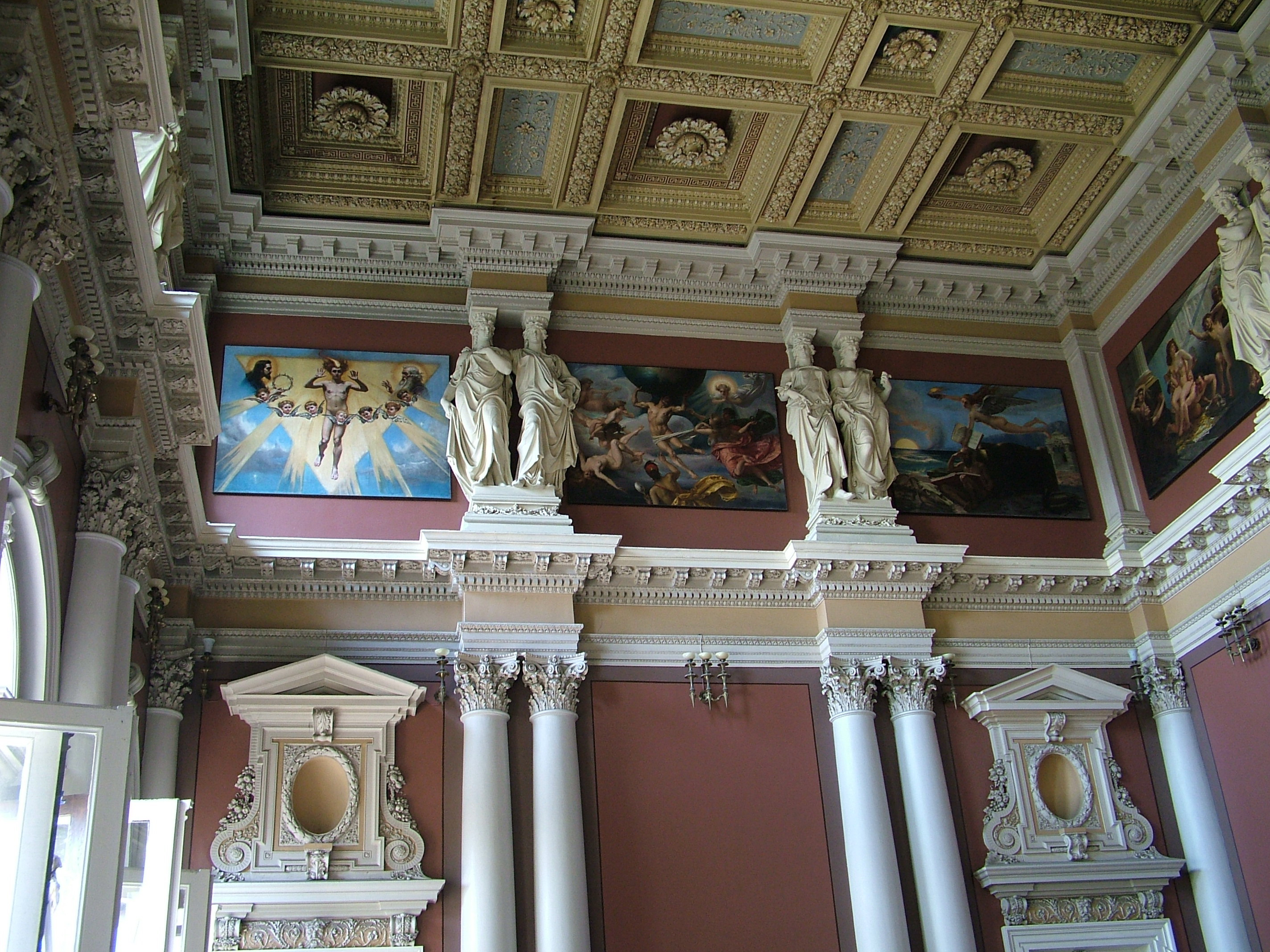
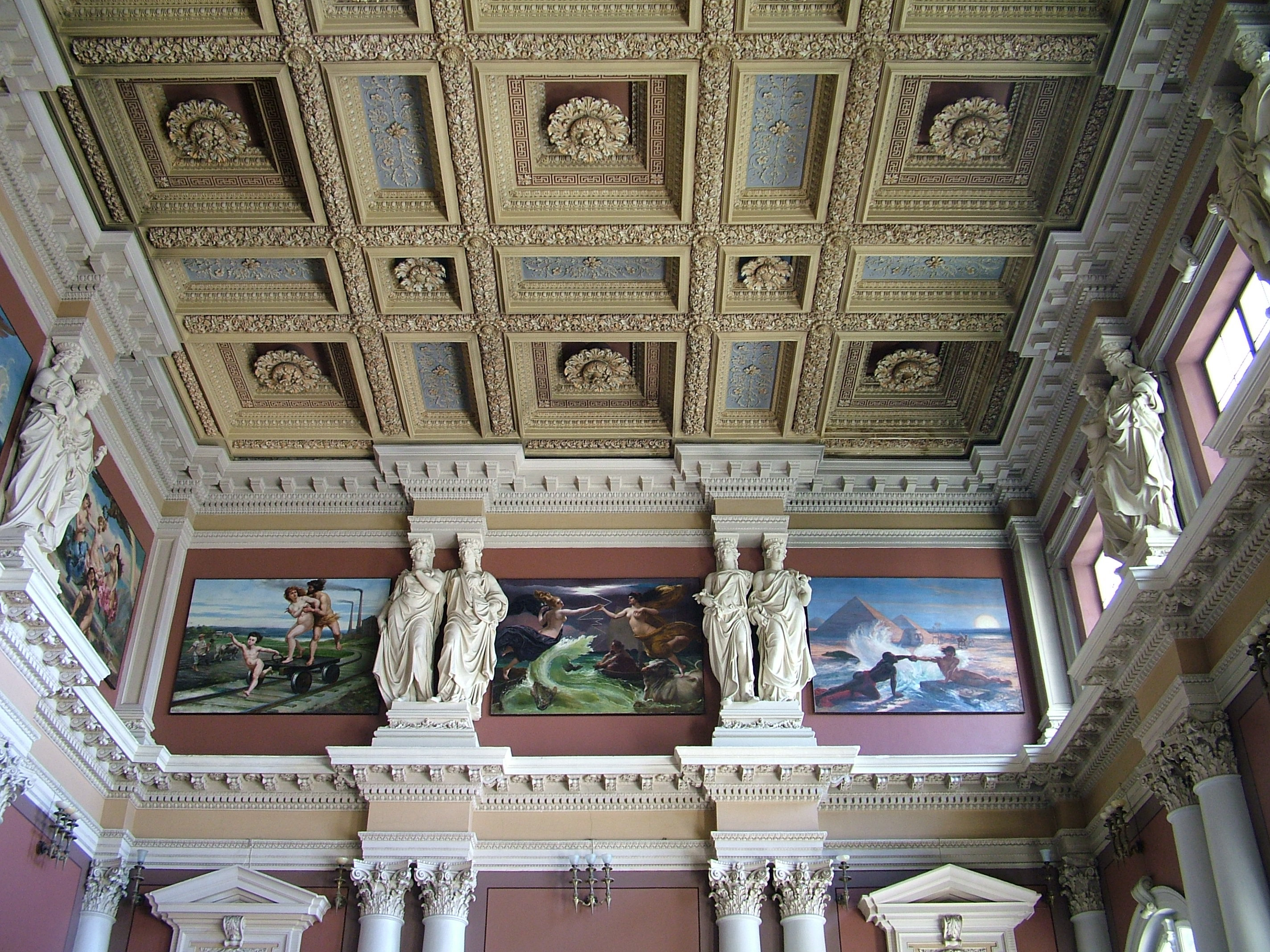
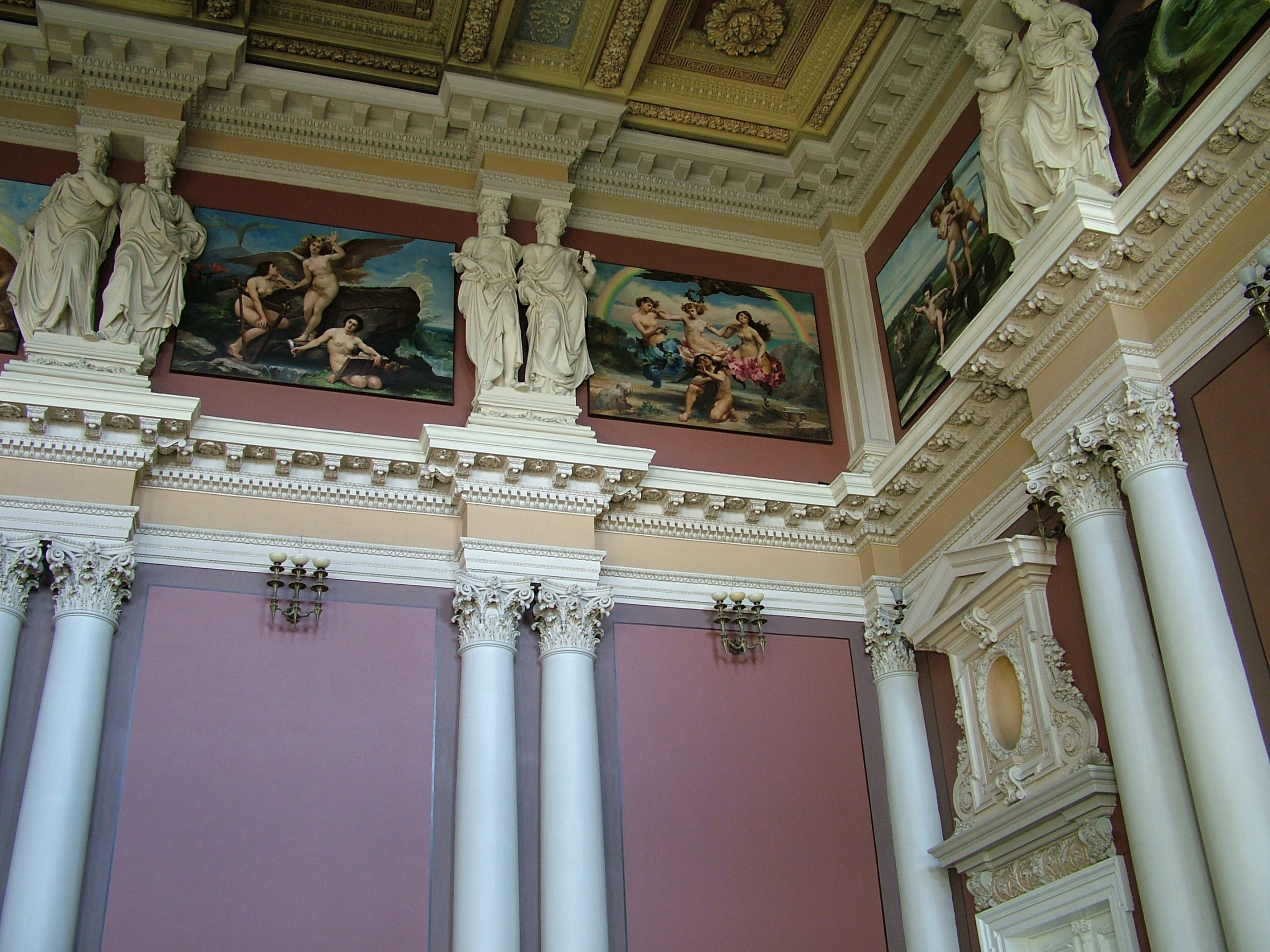
Images of the Aula of the Polytechnic, with 11 paintings by Jan Matejko.

- 1893: Due to efforts of Stanislaw Madejski, Minister of Education of Galicia, diplomas of the Polytechnic are regarded equal to diplomas of other renowned European schools of this kind.
- 1894: The 50th jubilee of the Polytechnical School. To commemorate that date, Professor Władysław Zajączkowski published the book "The Imperial Polytechnical School in Lviv. Historical essay on its foundation and development as well as its present state".
- 13 February 1894: The Polytechnic School Statute was adopted.
- 1905: Lviv Polytechnical School possessed the second place in the number of students after Vienna.
- 1914: As there were no limits on foreign students, in that year, students from the Russian-occupied part of Poland were some 30% of all. In that year, the school owned 11 laboratories and an astronomical station, and its library had some 20000 books.
- Russian occupation shut down the Polytechnic University for the 1914/15 academic year.

=== Second Polish Republic ===
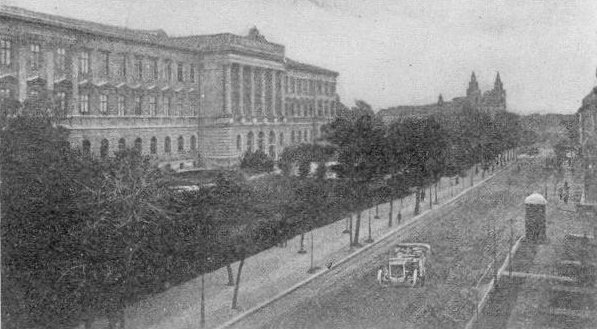
Lviv Polytechnic in the early 20th century

- November 1918: Students and professors of the Polytechnic take part in the Polish-Ukrainian war over Eastern Galicia. Poland won the war. Among those fighting on Polish side, there are Kazimierz Bartel, Stefan Bryła and Antoni Wereszczynski, who later became the rector.
- 8 November 1919: Polish Government unifies the Agricultural Academy in Dublany and Higher School of Forestry (Lwów) with Politechnical School.
- 28 June 1920: Adoption of the New Statute and renaming the Polytechnical School into Lwów Polytechnic (Polish: Politechnika Lwowska).
- 19 November 1922: The Polytechnic is awarded by the Polish Government with Cross of Defenders of Lwów. Earlier in that year, Marshal of France Ferdinand Foch comes to Lwów and is awarded the title of doctor honoris causa of the school.
- 23 February 1931: Council of the Faculty of Agriculture and Forestry of Polytechnic conferred academic rank of honorary doctor to professor Nils Handson (Stockholm, Sweden).
- 1934: Construction of the building of the library on Professor Street 1 was finished.
- 11 November 1936: President Ignacy Mościcki awards the school with Order Polonia Restituta in appreciation of its achievements.

=== Soviet Union ===
- October 1939: The polytechnic was renamed to Lviv Polytechnical Institute.

=== Nazi German occupation ===
- 4 July 1941 (at night): On Vuletsky Hills Ukrainian collaborators from the Organisation of Ukrainian Nationalists (OUN) and German occupiers, shot Polish professors of the Polytechnic Institute – Wlodzimierz Krukowski, Antoni Łomnicki, Stanislaw Pilat, Włodzimierz Stożek, Kazimierz Vetulani, Kasper Weigel, Roman Witkiewicz, Tadeusz Boy-Żeleński and others.
- 26 July 1941: Professor Kazimierz Bartel was murdered in the basements of Gestapo headquarters.
- Spring 1942 – Spring 1944: Special three-month courses for electrical engineers, road and bridge civil engineers, agrarian engineers, etc. were working in the premises, of the present Mechanical Technology Department. After the war, these classes were continued in Gliwice.
- Autumn 1944: The 100th jubilee of Lviv Polytechnical Institute was celebrated very quietly in Lviv – the Second World War was still going on.

=== Ukrainian SSR ===
- 1945: The Geodetic Department was founded. Most professors of Polish ethnicity, leave Lviv for Poland. The Polish traditions developed at the Polytechnic were continued at the Silesian University of Technology in Gliwice and Wrocław University of Technology.
- October 1946: The Lviv Polytechnical Institute began to publish the periodical newspaper "Lviv Polytechnic".
- 1952: The Radio-engineering Department was founded.
- 1962: The Automation, Electromechanical and Mechanical Technology Departments were founded.
- 1966: The Economical Engineering Department was founded.
- 1967: The Department of Technology of Organic Substances was founded.
- 1970: The second building of the library was erected.
- 1971: The Heating Engineering Department was founded.
- 1989: Democratic changes began at Polytechnical Institute
- 10 April 1991: Inauguration of the first democratically elected rector for the last 50 years – Yu. Rudavsky.

=== Ukraine ===
In 1992, after Ukraine had become independent, the Computer Engineering Department and Information Technology Department were founded. That same year, the Institute of Humanities was founded on the basis of the following chairs: History of Ukraine, its Science and Technology; Ukrainian Language; Politology; Philosophy; and Foreign Languages (English, German, French, Spanish, Russian, and Japanese). The Department of Applied Mathematics was founded in the following year, in 1993.

In June 1993, the Lviv Polytechnical Institute got the status of university, becoming Lviv Polytechnic State University. In the following year, it got the status of national university, becoming Lviv Polytechnic National University. On 8 July 2009, it received the status of self-governing (autonomous) national research university.

== Structure ==
The National University "Lviv Polytechnic" includes:

- 16 educational institutes (as well as the Institute of distance learning and the International Institute of Education, Culture and Relations with the Diaspora);
- Research Centre
- Scientific and technical library;
- 8 colleges, two gymnasiums;
- 34 teaching and laboratory buildings;
- 12 dormitories;
- 3 sports and health camps for students and teachers;
- Publishing house of Lviv Polytechnic National University;
- People's House "Prosvita (Lviv Polytechnic)";
- Design and Construction Association "Polytechnic";
- a geodetic polygon and an astronomical-geodesic laboratory.

The university has more than 35,000 students and extramural students. The training of specialists is carried out in 64 bachelor's areas and 124 specialities, of which 123 are master's level.

The teaching process is provided by a teaching staff of more than 2,200 people, of whom more than 320 are doctors of sciences and more than 1200 are associate professors, PhD. The educational process involves scientists from scientific institutions of the National Academy of Sciences of Ukraine, production enterprises and design institutes.

== Notable alumni ==
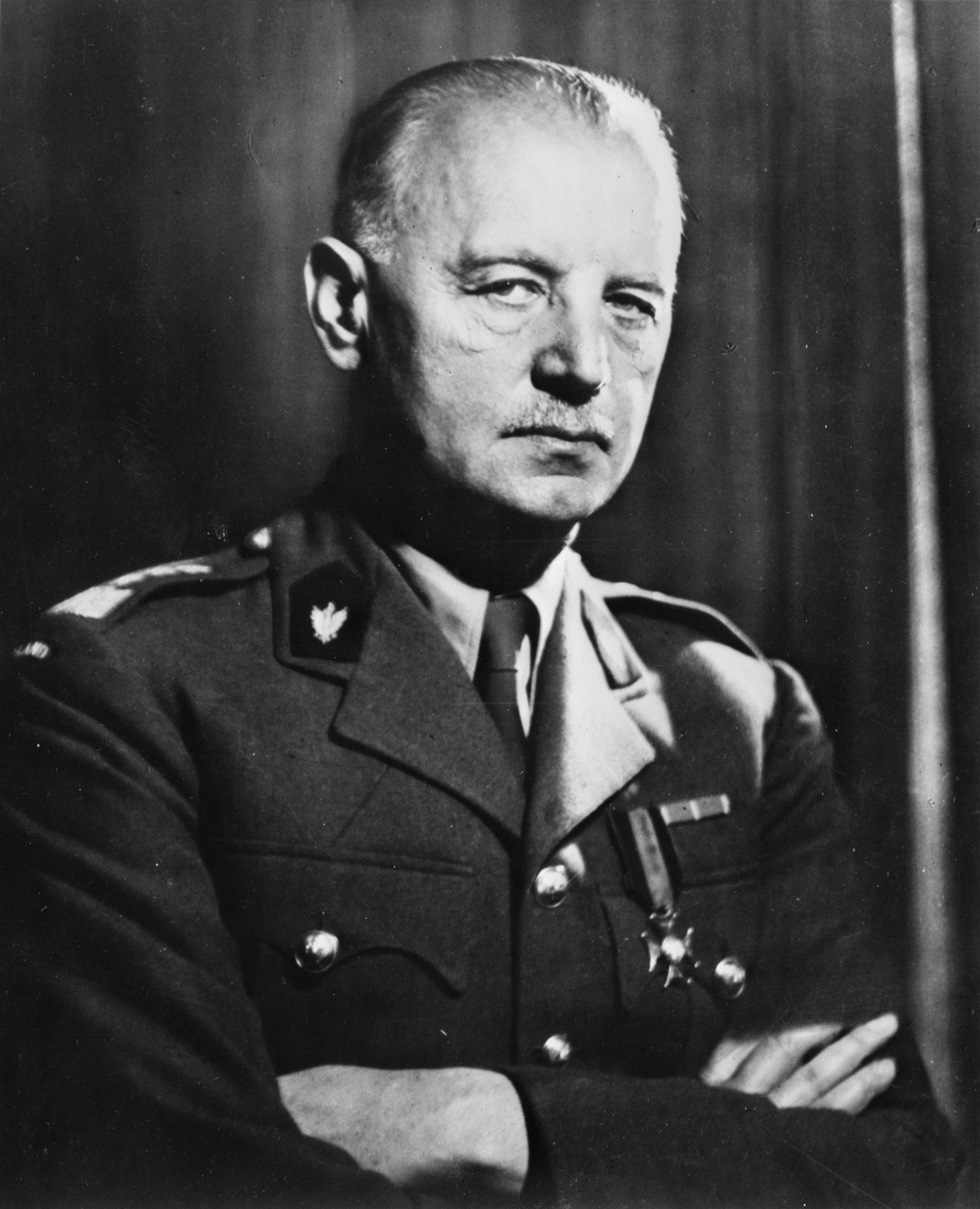
General Sikorski was an alumnus of the Lwów Polytechnic (1902–06)

- Tatiana Anodina (Soviet aviation engineer, long-term chief of the Interstate Aviation Committee in Russia)
- Józef Adam Baczewski (alcohol entrepreneur and owner of J. A. Baczewski company)
- Stefan Banach (mathematician)
- Kazimierz Bartel (Prime minister of Poland)
- Stefan Bryła (Polish construction engineer and welding pioneer)
- Emil Czyrniański (Polish chemist)
- Bohdana Durda (artist, writer, poet, songwriter)
- Tsakhiagiin Elbegdorj (President of Mongolia)
- Vera Kamsha (Russian fantasy writer)
- Polina Katsen (Ukrainian Women's National Chess Champion)
- Yuriy Lutsenko (Ukrainian politician and Prosecutor General of Ukraine)
- Apollinaire Osadca (New York architect, class of 1942)
- Włodzimierz Puchalski (photographer and film director)
- Diana Reiter (one of the first female architects in Kraków, and Nazi concentration camp victim)
- Wilhelm Orlik-Rueckemann (Polish general)
- Jan Jagmin-Sadowski (Polish general)
- Roman Shukhevych (Ukrainian politician and leader of the Ukrainian Insurgent Army (UPA))
- Klemens Stefan Sielecki (Polish engineer and technical director of Fablok)
- Władysław Sikorski (Polish general and prime minister)
- Stanislaw Ulam (mathematician, member of the Manhattan Project, major contributor to hydrogen bomb construction)
- Piotr Wilniewczyc (engineer)
- Vlodko Kaufman (artist, performer)

== Notable staff ==
- Stefan Banach (1892–1945), Polish mathematician
- Kazimierz Bartel (1882–1941), Polish mathematician and politician, Prime Minister of Poland
- Stefan Bryła (1886–1943), Polish engineer and welding pioneer
- Zoia Duriagina (born 1950), Ukrainian materials engineer
- Iryna Farion (1964–2024), Ukrainian linguist and politician
- Tytus Maksymilian Huber (1872–1950), Polish mechanical engineer
- Zygmunt Klemensiewicz (1886–1963), Polish physicist and physical chemist
- Kazimierz Kuratowski (1896–1980), Polish mathematician and logician
- Antoni Łomnicki (1881–1941), Polish mathematician
- Otto Nadolski (1880–1941), Polish engineer
- Władysław Orlicz (1903–1990), Polish mathematician
- Jan Henryk de Rosen (1891–1982), Polish artist and military officer
- Włodzimierz Stożek (1883–1941), Polish mathematician

== Other ==
- Ignacy Mościcki

== See also ==
List of universities in Ukraine
