= Dmytro Lazutkin =

Ukrainian poet, sports reporter, talkshow moderator

Dmytro Mykhailovych Lazutkin
- Дмитро Михайлович Лазуткін
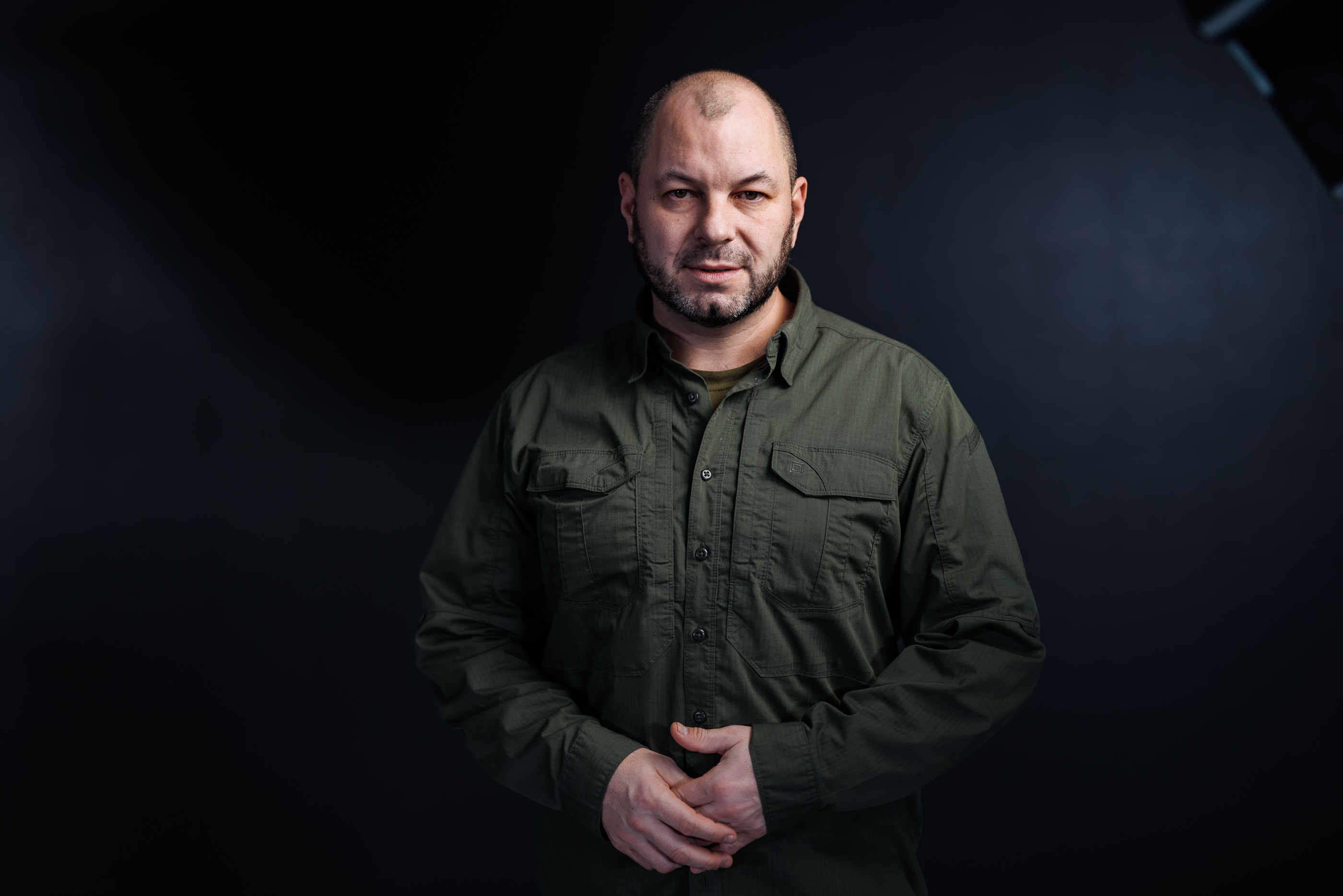
- Lazutkin in 2025
- Born: November 18, 1978 (age 47)
- Citizenship: Ukrainian
- Occupations: Poet, sports reporter, military officer
Dmytro Lazutkin
- Military career
- Branch: Ukrainian Armed Forces
- Rank: Major
- Units: 47th Mechanized Brigade "Magura"; 59th Separate Motorized Infantry Brigade
- Conflicts: Russian invasion of Ukraine

Dmytro Mykhailovych Lazutkin (Ukrainian: Дмитро Михайлович Лазуткін; born 18 November 1978) is a Ukrainian poet, sports reporter, and talkshow moderator, receiver of the Taras Shevchenko Prize (2024). He is a Major of Ukrainian Army and the Spokesperson of the Ministry of Defense of Ukraine (from 2024).

== Biography ==
After completing his engineering studies at Kyiv Polytechnic University, he initially worked as a metallurgical engineer and karate instructor while simultaneously studying journalism at Kyiv International University. He soon transitioned to television as a correspondent and sports reporter. His own achievements in sports made him a natural fit for the role, and he was a commentator on the 2008 Beijing Olympic Games, followed by those in Vancouver (2010) and London (2012), as well as the 2015 European Games in Baku. He also provides commentary for two Ukrainian television channels, primarily covering combat sports, especially boxing. In addition, he hosted a talk show called "The Men's Club." Lasutkin practiced various martial arts, including karate and kickboxing, at a near-professional level, winning several awards in each. He still occasionally competes in boxing matches.

In early 2023 he joined the "Magura" 47th Separate Mechanized Brigade and headed its public relations department. In February 2024 was assigned to the 59th Separate Motorized Infantry Brigade and then became spokesperson for Ukraine's Ministry of Defence.

== Poetry ==
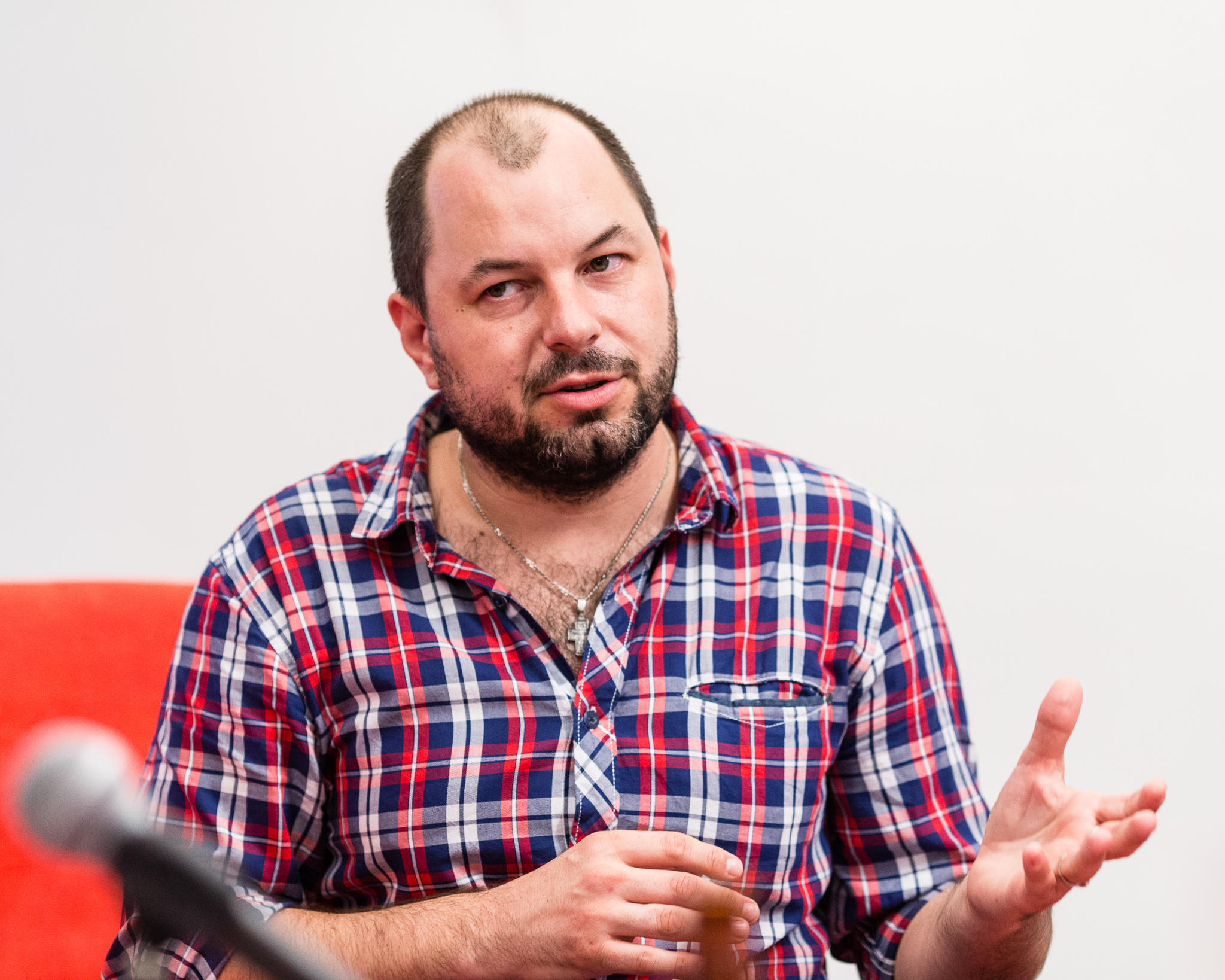
Dmytro Lazutkin, Month of Author Readings 2018, Wrocław, Poland

As a Ukrainian poet, Lazutkin became known in Ukraine in the early 2000ts. Scholarships motivated him to publish his first volumes of poetry between 2006 and 2008, followed by several more volumes from 2012 onwards. His affinity for sports soon led Lazutkin to discover poetry slam as a medium that would suit him best. The direct, clear language and fast pace typical of this genre are reflected in Lasutkin's overall poetic work. His poem "Requiem" became the basis for the oratorio "God With Us" (2014) by Ukrainian director Serhiy Proskurnya, a tribute to the "Heavenly Hundred." Prior to this, Lasutkin had already written lyrics for various Ukrainian musical groups.

== Awards and scholarships ==
- Bohdan-Ihor Antonych Prize „Pryvitannja zyttja“ (2000)
- Smoloskyp Award (2002)
- Winner of the "Hranoslov" Competition for the Best Works of Young Ukrainian Writers (2002)
- Recipient of the Polish "Gaude Polonia" Program Scholarship (2004)
- Literary Olymp (2006)
- Kul’trevanš
- Laureate of „Russkaja premija“
- Winner of the 1st open Championship for „Overslam“ (Literary Slam) (Kharkiv 2007)
- Spivdruzhnist debyutov Tajikistan (2008)
- Taras Shevchenko Prize (2024)

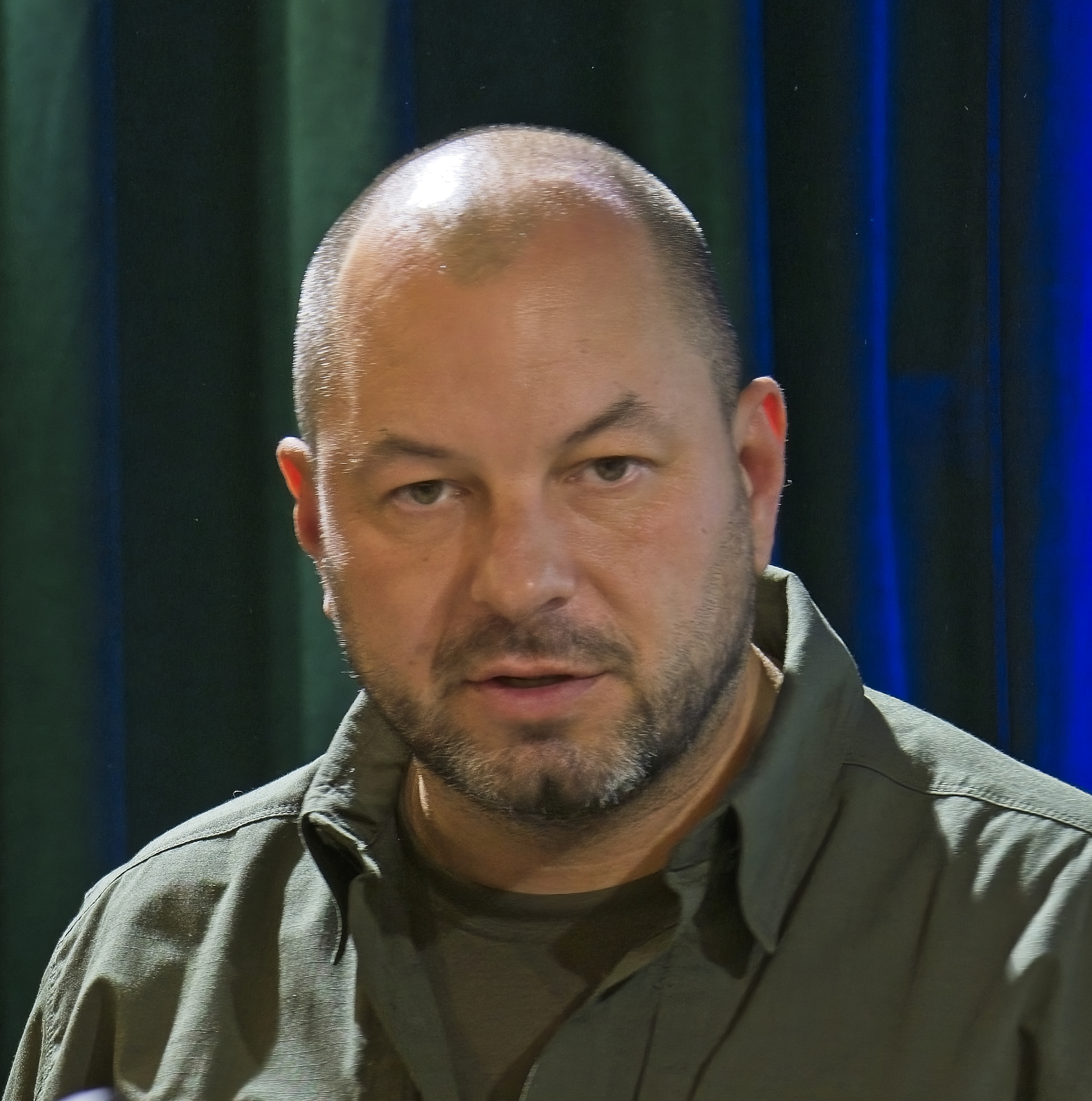
Dmytro Lazutkin presenting his poetry book "Zakladka" (Bookmark) in Lviv, 2024

== Sports awards ==
- Bronze medalist in kickboxing and kick-jitsu
- Champion of Ukraine in Cossack sparring
- Black belt in Kempo Karate

== Publications ==
- Roofs (Dachy - Дахи). Kyiv 2003
- Sweets for reptiles (Sododošči dlja plazuniv - Солодощі для плазунів). Kyiv 2006.
- Sacred cows loaded with grass (Nabyti travoju svjaščenni korovi - Набиті травою священні корови). Kyiv 2006
- Paprika dreams (Paprika grez - Паприка грез). Moscow 2006.
- Gasoline (Бензин). Kyiv 2008.
- Good songs about bad girls (Dobri pisni pro pohanych divčat - Добрі пісні про поганих дівчат). Kamianec-Podolskyi 2012.
- Christmas carols and waltzes (Koljadky i val’sy - Колядочки і вальси). Ternopil 2014.
- Red Book (Červona knyha - Червона книга). Chernivtsi (Meridian Czernowitz) 2015.
- Bookmark (Zakladka - Закладка). Lviv 2022.
