= MEMORIA MMC =

Ukrainian veterans' motorcycle club

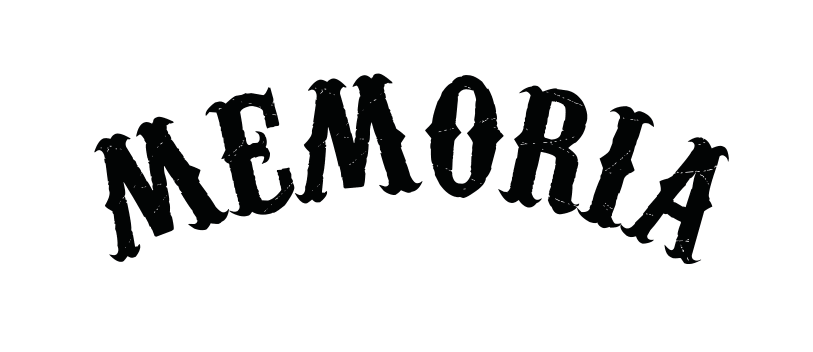
- Founded: July 29, 2023
- Founder: Artem Grot
- Type: Veterans' motorcycle club
- Purpose: Honoring the memory of the fallen, supporting veterans, and developing the veterans' community
- Location: Ukraine
- Website: www.memoriammc.com

MEMORIA MMC (full name: Military Motorcycle Club “MEMORIA”) is a Ukrainian veterans' motorcycle club founded on 29 July 2023 by Artem Grot, a veteran of the Special Operations Forces of the Armed Forces of Ukraine. The club unites active-duty service members and veterans of the Russo-Ukrainian War and is involved in the development of the veterans' community.

In its own materials, MEMORIA MMC positions itself as the first Ukrainian military motorcycle club.

The club was formed as a community whose goals include honoring the memory of fallen comrades, preserving the culture of brotherhood, and implementing sports, educational, and social initiatives within the veterans' environment.

== History ==
The idea of creating the club is associated with Aliaksiej Skoblia, a service member of the Special Operations Forces of the Armed Forces of Ukraine who was killed on 13 March 2022 during the defense of Kyiv Oblast in the village of Moshchun.

According to club members, he had aspired to create a veterans' motorcycle club as a way to unite his comrades.

After his death, the initiative was carried out by Artem Grot, who founded MEMORIA MMC and, together with club members, granted Aliaksiej Skoblia the status of president of the club posthumously.

The club was officially established on 29 July 2023 in Kyiv.

The club's official slogan is “Ride and fight”.

Club symbolism: “On the backs of their vests is a flaming skull wearing a military beret. This is a fallen comrade that every club member has” — Serafym Hordiienko, a club member.

== Activities ==
MEMORIA MMC engages in activities supporting veterans and developing the veterans' community. Its main directions include organizing motorcycle rides and memorial events, participating in charitable initiatives, supporting service members and veterans, holding sports and social events, and building a community of mutual support.

Club members participate in motorcycle rallies, charitable events, and support for veterans' initiatives. The club cooperates with other veterans' organizations and takes part in joint projects, particularly those related to the development of the sports veterans' environment.

According to the club, the M13 community has formed on the basis of MEMORIA MMC, within which a number of initiatives in the fields of sports, education, and social integration of veterans are implemented.

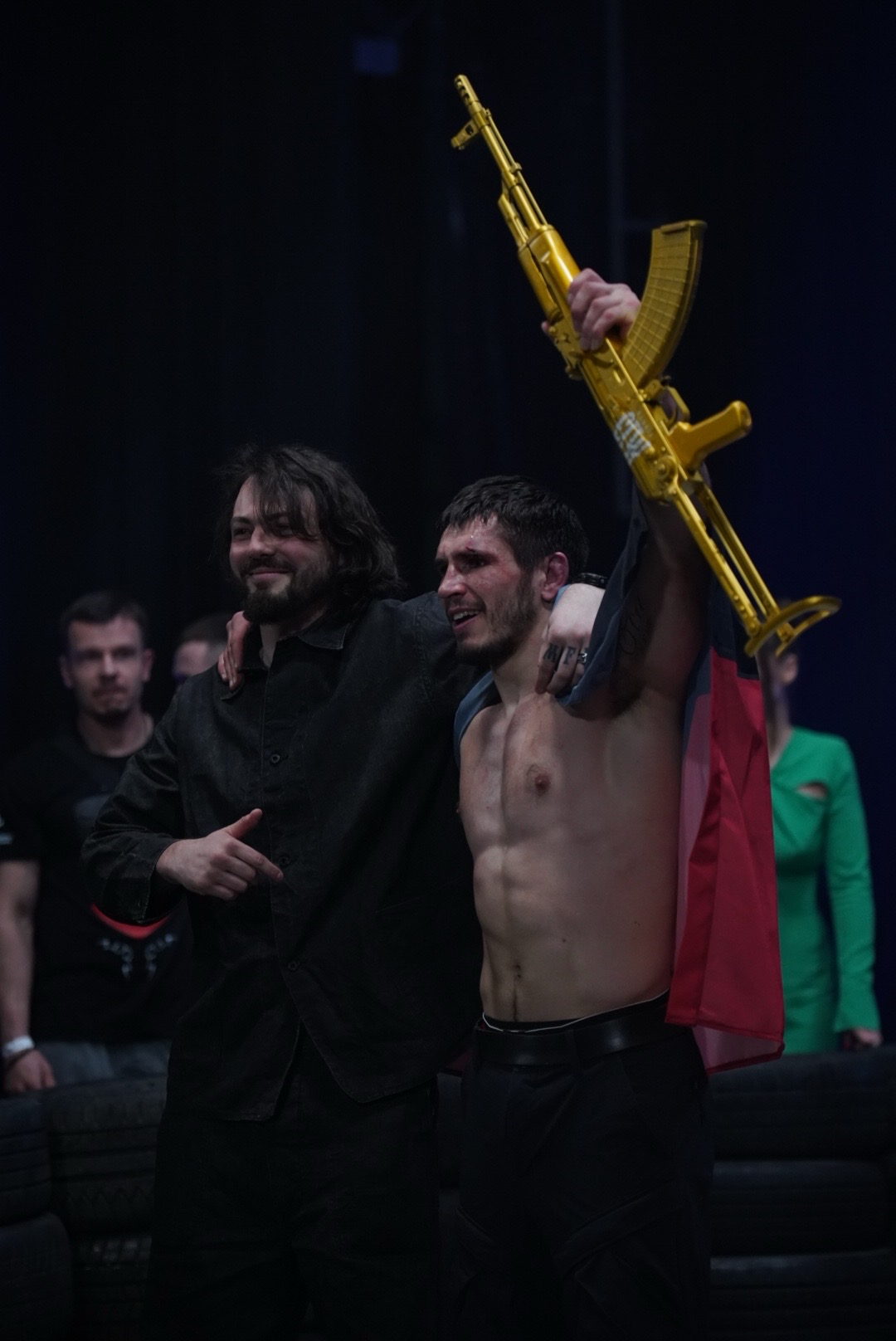
Artem Grot during a bare-knuckle fighting tournament among military personnel organized by M13 Fights in Khmelnytskyi, 2026

One of the key projects of this community is M13 Fights — a series of sports events involving service members and veterans. The community also includes veterans and professional athletes, among them public figures and ambassadors of the veterans' movement such as Oleksandr Teren, Serafym Hordiienko and others.

== Related projects ==
Within the ecosystem that has formed around MEMORIA MMC, the following projects are implemented:

- TMS HUB — a sports space where military personnel with amputations or injuries train, in particular in Brazilian jiu-jitsu, as a means of physical and psychological rehabilitation.
- M13 Academy — a firearms training direction focused on basic and advanced weapon-handling skills.
- M13 Gym — a sports space for physical training, rehabilitation and recovery of veterans, with a focus on combat sports, functional training and adaptive workouts.
- M13 Business Hub — a platform supporting veterans' entrepreneurship, aimed at helping them create and develop their own businesses.
- M13 Workshop — a practical direction that includes a workshop and a coffee shop.
- M13 Fights — a series of combat sports events that combines competitions, social integration and charitable initiatives.

== Ideology ==
The activities of MEMORIA MMC are based on the principles of honoring the memory of fallen service members, continuing their work in civilian life, preserving the culture of brotherhood, mutual support among veterans, and social responsibility.

== See also ==
- Artem Grot
- M13 Fights
