= Vlodko Kaufman =

Ukrainian painter

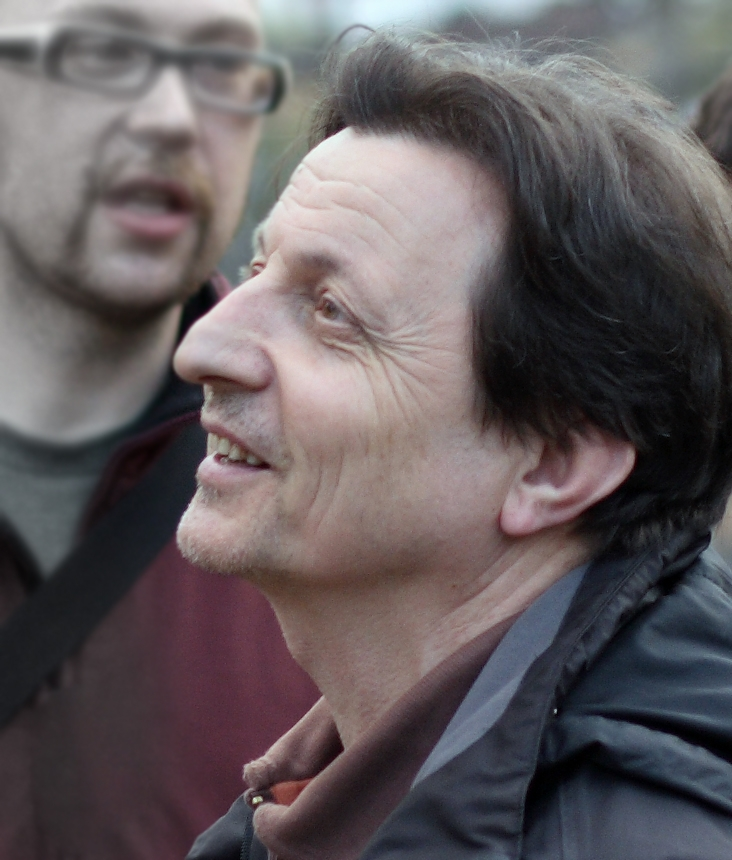
- Born: Karaganda
- Education: Lviv Ivan Trush College of Decorative and Applied Arts, Lviv Polytechnic
- Occupations: Painter, graphic artist, performing artist, curator
- Website: vlodkaufman.com.ua

Vlodko (Volodymyr) Kaufman (born March 2, 1957) is a Ukrainian artist of German descent, painter, graphic artist and performer. He is the author of many art projects, and participant in solo and group exhibitions.

== Biography ==
Vlodko Kaufman was born on March 2, 1957, in Karaganda, Kazakh Soviet Socialist Republic. He studied at the Lviv School of Applied and Decorative Arts named after Ivan Trush in 1974–1978. He studied at the Lviv Polytechnic Institute, majoring in architecture in 1978-1980. Kaufman received first prize, in painting, "Autumn Meetings" from Lviv Art Gallery in 1986. He worked in the variety theater "Don't be sad!" as artist in residence in 1988. In 1989-1993, he was a member of the art society "The Way" and participated in its group exhibitions in Lviv, Kharkiv, Lublin and Kraków.

In 1992, he was the main artist of the "Vyvyh" festival. In 1993, he was the main artist of the festival "Ukrainian Youth of Christ". In 1993, he became a co-founder of the artistic association "Dzyga". He was its art director. In 1993, he presented the opening "Letters to Earthlings, or the Eighth Seal" in the Lviv Art Gallery, as well as the exhibition and installation "Incomprehensible Ruin".

In 2005-2006, his painting "Disposal of Nostalgia*" was installed in "Dzyza" (the coffee shop "Under the Hourglass"). He became a co-founder of the Institute of Modern Art in 2007. In 2008, the performances "Home Excursion" and "Sacred Poltva" as part of the "Art-Depot" project (Lviv), the performance "Declaration of Emptiness" as part of the "GogolFest" festival (Kyiv), performance and video art in the clockwork of the Drohobytsk Town Hall as part of the III Bruno Schultz International Festival "Performance in Clock" (Drohobych), installation, performance "B. N." within the framework of the Week of Actual Art (Lviv). He actively collaborated with the Lviv Academic Theater named after Lesya Kurbas, the National Academic Ukrainian Drama Theater named after M. Zankovetska, the First Ukrainian Theater for Children and Youth, the National Academic Theater named after I. Franko (Kyiv).

He was the curator of the "Week of Current Art" project (Lviv) in 2008-2009 and curator of the parallel program of the First International Art Festival "Fort. Missia" (the village of Popovichi, Mostysky District, Lviv Region) in 2009.

In 2009, he presented the performance "Shachivnytsia" as part of the "L2" project (Lublin), as well as during the Contemporary Art Week in Lviv. Installed graphics "Bird therapy" in "Dzyza".

== Works ==
(Note: If a grouping name or job title has a meaning in English, the translation is enclosed in chevrons.)

=== Personal projects ===
- Listi do Zemlyan abo Vosma Pechat («Letters to Earthlings or the Eighth Seal») (1993), happening, Lviv Art Gallery
- Nezbagnenna ruynatsіya («Unfathomable Destruction») (1993), exhibition and installation, Lviv Art Gallery
- Dzerkalny korop («Mirror Carp») (1994), happening (transformation), Znesinnia Park (Lviv)
- Den narodzhennya («Birthday») (1994), happening, The Gunpowder Tower (Lviv)
- Їzha («Food») (1995), performance, art studio of Emmanuil Mysko (Lviv)
- Komedіya ekstazu («A Comedy of Ecstasy») (1995), performance, Dzyga Culture and Art Center (Lviv)
- klub-kav'yarnya "Vavіlon KhKh…" («Club-cafe "Babylon XX…"») (1996), kitsch, Ukrayina Cinema Center (Lviv)
- Retrospektsіya («Retrospection») (1996), performance and installation, Dzyga Culture and Art Center (Lviv)
- Versії napovnennya («Versions of Filling») (1997), installation, Dzyga Culture and Art Center (Lviv)
- Povernennya Іkara («The Return of Icarus») (1998), art-mix, Dzyga Culture and Art Center (Lviv)
- Shchodennik («Diary») (1998), with Natalka Shimin, performance and installation, Dzyga Culture and Art Center (Lviv)
- Chas-konstanta. Vіdeo І («Time-Constant. Video I») (1999), Dzyga Culture and Art Center (Lviv)
- Second Hand (z drugikh ruk). Vіdeo ІІ («Second Hand. Video II») (2000), Dzyga Culture and Art Center (Lviv)
- Lapannya chasu. Vіdeo ІІІ («Catching of Time. Video III») (2000), Dzyga Culture and Art Center (Lviv)
- Tse shche ne svoboda… («This Is Not Freedom Yet…») (2001), art-provocation of the streets of Lviv; video, Dzyga Culture and Art Center (Lviv)
- Dzerkalny khrest («Mirror Cross») (2001), exhibition and installation, Dzyga Culture and Art Center (Lviv)
- І ti Bruno… («And You, Bruno…») (2001), exhibition and installation, Dzyga Culture and Art Center (Lviv)
- Mekhanіchna anatomіya zvuku («Mechanical Anatomy of Sound») (2002), performance, installation and object, The Gunpowder Tower (Lviv)
- Gra v gru («Playing the Game») (2002), polygraphic project, Dzyga Culture and Art Center (Lviv)
- Tekhnologіya chuynostі («Technology of Responsiveness») (2002), installed painting, Dzyga Culture and Art Center (Lviv) and Sensus (Kyiv)
- Vesna bez nazvi («A Spring Without a Name») (2003), exhibition and performance, Young Spectator's Theatre (now First Ukrainian Theater for Children and Youth) (Lviv)
- U fokusі snu («In the Focus of Dream») (2003), performance and installation, club-gallery K-11 (Kyiv)
- Pam'yatі Dyushampa («In Memory of Duchamp») (2003), performance, club-cafe Lialka (Lviv)
- Tsitati dlya gnіzd («Quotes for Nests») (2004), installed graphics, objects and photographs, club-gallery K-11 (Kyiv); in 2005 was played in the club-gallery Alchemia (Krakow) and in 2006 in the Dzyga Culture and Art Center (Lviv)
- Padіnnya polyotu («Falling of a Flight») (2004), performance and video art, first part in Stryiskyi Park (Lviv), second part in gallery L-art (Kyiv); in 2005 was played in Kraków
- Utilіzatsіya nostalgії («Utilization of Nostalgia») (2005–2006), installed painting, Dzyga Culture and Art Center, in cafe Pіd klepsidroiu (Lviv)
- Karpatorozdіl («Carpathian Divide») (2007), installed painting, Dzyga Culture and Art Center (Lviv)
- Pobutova ekskursіya («Everyday Excursio») (2008), performance, part of Art-Depo project (Lviv)
- Svyashchenna Poltva («Holy Poltva») (2008), installation, part of Art-Depo project (Lviv)
- Deklaratsіya porozhnechі («A Declaration of Emptiness») (2008), performance, part of GogolFest festival (Kyiv)
- Vistava v godinniku («A Spectacle in the Clock») (2008), performance and video art inside the clock mechanism of the city hall building in Drohobych, as part of the 3rd International Bruno Schulz Festival
- B. N. (2008), performance and installation, Week of Contemporary Art (Lviv)
- Shakhіvnitsya («Chessboard») (2009), performance, part of the project L2 (Lublin) and Week of Contemporary Art (Lviv)
- Ptakhoterapіya («Bird-therapy») (2009), installed graphics, Dzyga Culture and Art Center (Lviv)
- Chas ribi («The Time of Fish») (2010), performance, festival Shultsfest-2010 (Drohobych)
- Sproba peredchuttya («An Attempt of Premonition») (2010), installation, First International Art Festival Fort. Missia (Popovychi, Mostyska Raion, Lviv Oblast)
- B. N. (2010), performance, Week of Contemporary Art (Lviv)

=== Group projects ===
- Group exhibitions 1989–1993) of the Shliaj («The Way») art group in Lviv, Kharkiv, Lublin and Krakow
- Main artist in festival ViViKh-92 («Dislocation-92») (1992, Lviv)
- Main artist in festival Ukraїnska molod – Khristovі («Ukrainian Youth — Christ») (1993, Lviv)
- Main artist in the tour of contemporary Ukrainian music Svoboda Viboru («Freedom of Choice») throughout Ukraine (1994)
- Main artist in festival of Ukrainian culture in Przemysl, Poland (1995)
- Scenography, together with Natalka Shimin, of the theater production Apokrifi («Apocryphs») (1996), directed by Volodymyr Kuchynskyi, Les Kurbas Theatre (Lviv)
- Perfosalon («Punch salon») (1996), Dzyga Culture and Art Center (Lviv)
- Group exhibition of Lviv artists (1996) (Vienna, Austria)
- Vlasny dosvіd («Own Experience») (1996), exhibition of paintings (Truskavets)
- Scenography, together with Natalka Shimin, Antonina Denisiuc y Serhiy Sinitsyn, of the play Tretє tisyacholіttya («Third Millennium») (1997), Lviv Palace of Arts
- Difraktsіya tekstu («Diffraction of Text») (1998), all-Ukrainian artists' book exhibition, Dzyga Culture and Art Center (Lviv)
- Main artist in the international art project Ґrandi Mistetstva («Grands of Art») (1998–1999), Lviv Theatre of Opera and Ballet
- Prividi іkon - Ekologіya-2003 («Icon Ghosts» - «Ecology-2003») (2001), art laboratory, Experimental Ceramic and Sculptural Factory (Lviv)
- Velike Brunove gnіzdo («Bruno's Big Nest»), Pam'yatnik Danilovі Galitskomu («Danylo Halytskyi Monument») and other (2001), project Novy Noїv kovcheg («New Noah's Ark»), art laboratory in Sida hamlet (Vyshkivskyi Mountain Pass)
- Mіlіtarny sentiment («Military Sentiment») (2001), installation, Mova Festival, Dzyga Culture and Art Center (Lviv)
- Scenography of the play Nash Taras («Our Taras») (2003), directed by Roman Valko, Yuri Drohobych Regional Academic Music and Drama Theater (Drohobych)
- Donumenta (2003), festival of Ukrainian culture (Regensburg, Germany)
- Scenography of the play Art (2004), directed by Vadym Sikorskyi, Maria Zankovetska Theatre (Lviv)
- Padіnnya polyotu («Falling of a Flight») (2004), performance and video art, project Utopіya («Utopia»), gallery L-art (Kyiv)
- Josef Beuys («Josef Beuys») (2005), installation, project Dіti Boysa («Beuys' Children»), Dzyga Culture and Art Center (Lviv)
- Paralelі Znakіv («Parallels of Signs») (2005), Easter installations, Dzyga Culture and Art Center (Lviv)
- Scenography of the play Ukr. shchastya («Stolen Happiness») (2005), directed by Roman Valko, Young Spectator's Theatre (now First Ukrainian Theater for Children and Youth) (Lviv)
- Narkіs («Narciss») (2005), art space directed by Volodymyr Kuchynskyi, Les Kurbas Theatre (Lviv)
- B. N., object, 2nd Symposium Ekologіya-Z000 («Ecology-Z000»), Chas zbirati kamіnnya («Time to Collect Stones»), abandoned austrian underground warehouses (Lviv)
- Scenography of the play Ochіkuyuchi na Godo… («Waiting for Godo…») (2006), art space directed by Oleksiy Kravchuk, Les Kurbas Theatre (Lviv)
- Posered Rayu na maydanі («Amid the Paradise on Maidan») (2006), art space directed by Volodymyr Kuchynskyi, Ivan Franko National Academic Drama Theater (Kyiv)
- MA – NA – HAT – TA (2006), directed by Volodymyr Kuchynskyi, Les Kurbas Theatre (Lviv)
- Transformatsіya avangardu («The Transformation of Avant-Garde») (2007), performance, together with Serhiy Savchenko and Yuriy Yaremchuk, Lublin (Poland)
- reANIMATION, Lviv Art Gallery
- Exhibition Lvіv (2007), project Who is Lviv, New Synagogue (Berlin, Germany)
- IDEA (2007), performance, IV European Festival of Performing Arts War(Warsaw, Poland) and 2nd Days of Performance Art in Kyiv
- Teplotrasa («Insulated pipeline») (2007), object, VI Bienalle of Experimental Textile Textile Frenzy (Lviv)
- Amnezіya, abo Malenkі podruzhnі zlochini («Amnesia or petty marital crimes») (2008), art space by Eric-Emanuel Schmitt, director de escena Volodymyr Kuchynskyi, Les Kurbas Theatre (Lviv)
- Dvі kvіtki kolyoru іndigo («Two Flowers of Indigo Color») (2008), video sequence directed by Oleksandr Bіlozub, Ivan Franko National Academic Drama Theater (Kyiv)
- Curator of project Tizhden aktualnogo mistetstva in Week of Contemporary Art from 2008 and 2009 (Lviv)
- Ekoteatr («Ecotheater») (2009), installation, OPEN CITY International Festival (Lublin, Poland)
- Curator of supporting program of 1st International Art Festival Fort. Missia (2009) (Popovichi, Mostysky district, Lviv oblast)
- Curator of the triennial Ukrainian Cross-Section (2010)
- Triennial of Contemporary Ukrainian Art (2013, Lublin)
- Flashback. Ukrainian Media Art of the 1990s (2018), Mystetskyi Arsenal (Kyiv)

== Sources ==
- Офіційний сайт В.Кауфмана (укр.)
- Інтерв'ю В. Кауфмана
- Інтерв'ю В. Кауфмана // Сайт «Дзиґи»
- The Ukrainian Weekly
