= Artem Grot =

Ukrainian military instructor (born 1995)

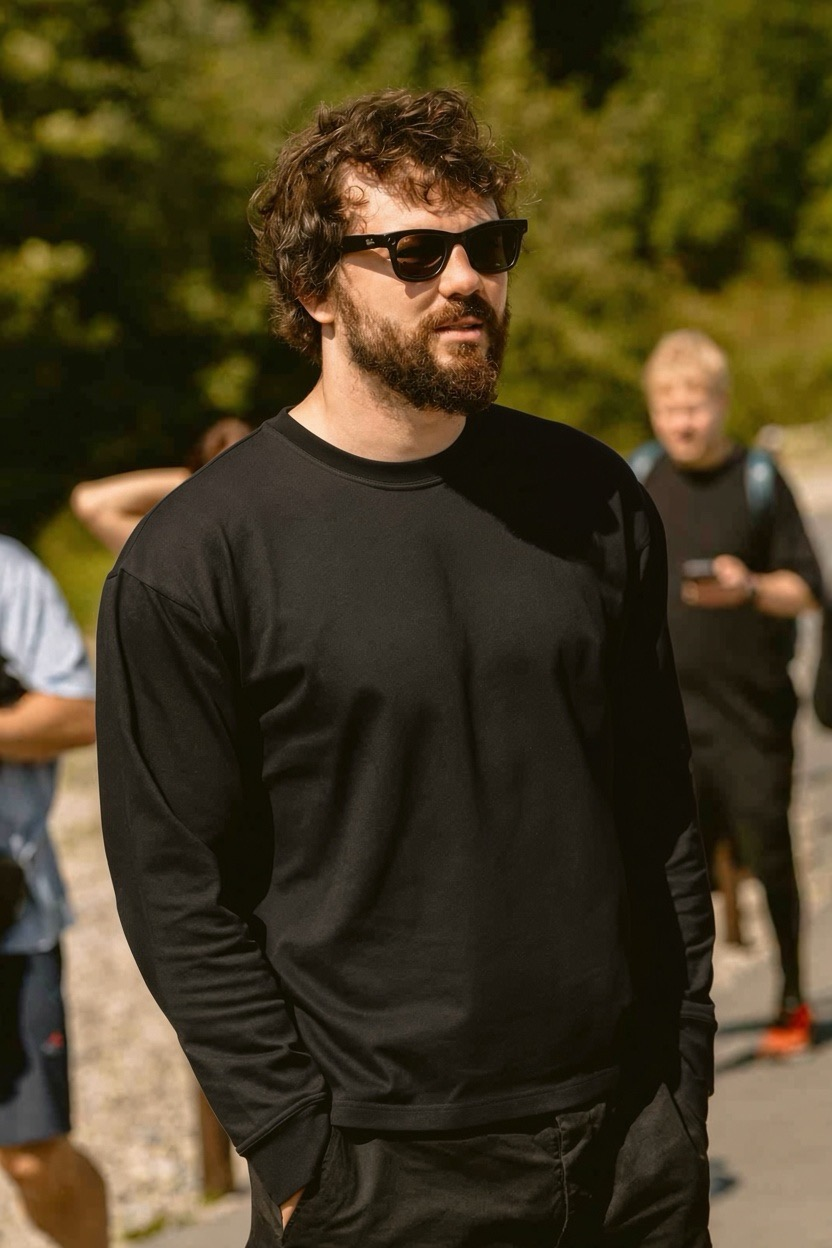
- Born: Artem Gennadyevich Kuzmich; 6 August 1995 (age 31); Vitebsk, Belarus
- Military career
- Branch: Armed Forces of Ukraine
- Service years: 2014–2021
- Nickname: Grot
- Unit: Azov Regiment (2014–2015) Special Operations Forces (Ukraine) (2016–2021)
- Commands: Instructor
- Conflicts: Russo-Ukrainian War
- Other work: Brazilian jiu-jitsu athlete, veteran activist, entrepreneur

Artem Grot (Belarusian: Арцём Грот), born Artem Gennadyevich Kuzmich (Belarusian: Арцём Генадзевіч Кузьміч); call sign Grot (born 6 August 1995, Vitebsk, Belarus) is a Ukrainian military veteran of the Special Operations Forces (Ukraine), Brazilian jiu-jitsu practitioner (world champion in para-jiu-jitsu), and social activist of Belarusian origin. He is the founder of the TMS HUB sports hub for veteran rehabilitation, the M13 Fights fighting league, and the MEMORIA MMC motorcycle club.

== Early life ==
Grot was born on 6 August 1995 in Minsk, Belarus. As a teenager, he was interested in the opposition movement and was involved with the ultras scene. At the age of 18, after the Euromaidan events of 2014, he decided to travel to Ukraine and join the fight against Russian aggression.

== Military service ==
In June 2014, he volunteered for the Azov Regiment, where he served until 2015.

From 2016, he served in the Special Operations Forces (Ukraine). In 2017, he successfully completed the qualification course for Special Operations Forces personnel (Q-course). From 2019 to 2021, he worked as an instructor training special operations personnel.

In February 2019, while on a combat mission, he was injured by a landmine explosion and lost the lower part of his left leg (below-knee amputation). After four months of rehabilitation, he continued serving as an instructor until the spring of 2021, when he ended his military career.

== Sports career ==
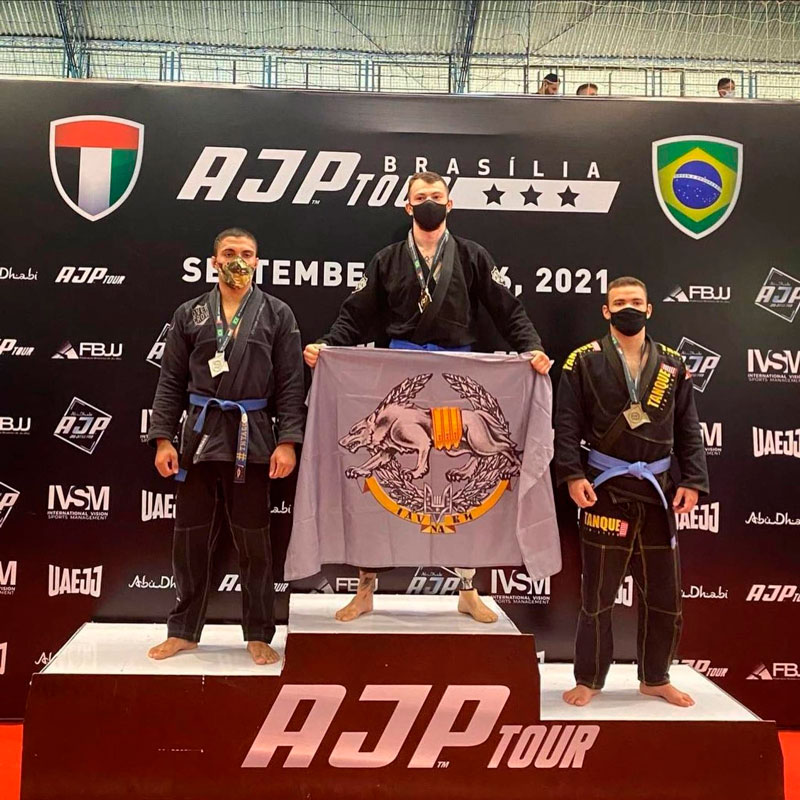
Grot winning an international Brazilian jiu-jitsu tournament in Brazil, 2021

In 2020, Grot began intensive training in Brazilian jiu-jitsu as part of his physical rehabilitation. In just 8 months, he earned a blue belt, logging around 300 hours on the mats and competing in four tournaments. In 2021, he won his first gold medals at Ukrainian Brazilian jiu-jitsu championships in both GI and NO-GI divisions.

In September 2021, he participated in the AJP Tour international tournament in Brazil, competing in the Adult (blue belt) and Para Jiu-Jitsu (absolute) categories and winning gold in both. During his time in Brazil, he also trained at a specialized academy working exclusively with athletes with disabilities to learn inclusive sports methods.

In July 2021, the Ukrainian Brazilian jiu-jitsu league TMS announced the "Inclusive Jiu-Jitsu" project, initiated and led by Artem Grot. In 2022, based on his own experience and international training, he founded TMS HUB – Ukraine's first specialized Brazilian jiu-jitsu space for veterans and athletes with disabilities, focused on physical rehabilitation and social adaptation through sport.

Grot currently holds a black belt in Brazilian jiu-jitsu and continues to compete and develop inclusive veteran sports programs.

== Social activity ==
In 2023, he founded TMS HUB in Kyiv – an inclusive space offering free Brazilian jiu-jitsu training for military personnel and veterans with disabilities (particularly amputees). The project has grown into a network of veteran clubs.

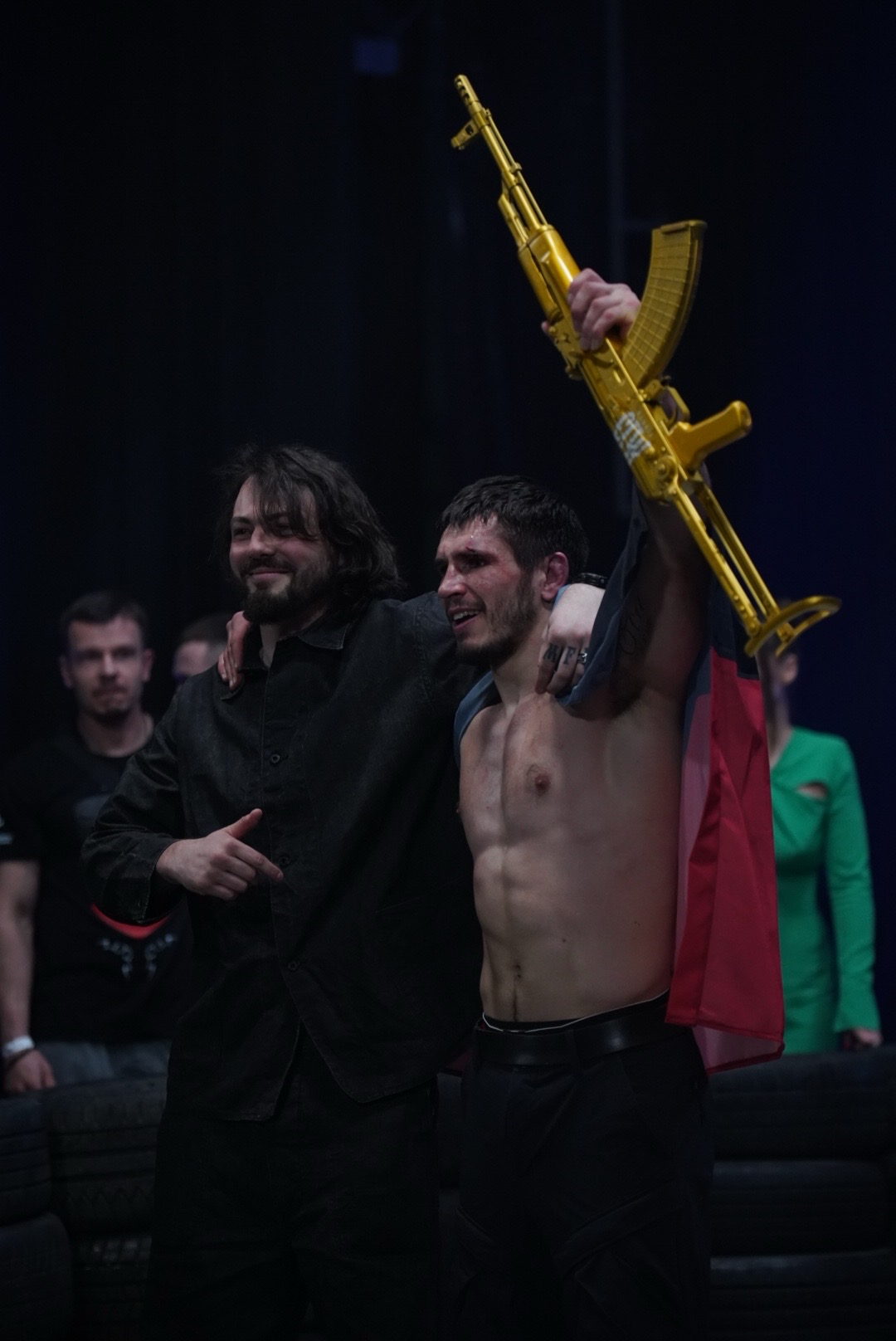
Artem Grot during a bare-knuckle fighting tournament among military personnel organized by M13 Fights in Khmelnytskyi, 2026

He is also the founder of the M13 Fights fighting league (tournaments featuring fist fights and medieval combat for representatives of Ukraine's Defense Forces, including amputee veterans) and the MEMORIA MMC veteran motorcycle club.

In 2024, he helped clear rubble following the Russian strike on the Okhmatdyt children's hospital in Kyiv.

In March 2026, he announced the opening of a veteran restaurant on Yaroslaviv Val Street in central Kyiv. Profits from the restaurant will be directed toward the rehabilitation of military personnel with amputations and the creation of jobs for veterans. Grot describes this as part of a new model for the veteran movement – moving from reliance on donations to independent business.
