= Zoia Duriagina =

Ukrainian scientist

Zoia Antonivna Duriagina
- Born: 8 June 1950 (age 76); Lviv, Ukraine
- Education: Lviv Polytechnic National University
- Occupations: Scientist, materials engineer

Zoia Antonivna Duriagina (Ukrainian: Зоя Антонівна Дурягіна; born 8 June 1950 in Lviv) is a Ukrainian scientist, materials engineer, doctor of sciences, professor, full member of the Academy of Sciences of Higher Education of Ukraine, a member of Shevchenko Scientific Society, and the head of the Department of Applied Materials Science and Materials Processing at the Institute of Engineering Mechanics and Transport, which is part of Lviv Polytechnic National University.

She has an entry in the Encyclopedia of Modern Ukraine.

== Biography ==
Zoia Duriagina was born on 8 June 1950 in the Lviv. After graduating from Lviv Secondary School № 6 in 1967, she entered the Lviv Polytechnic Institute, graduating in 1972 with a degree in metallurgical engineering in the specialty "Physics of Metals." In the same year she entered graduate school at the Department of Physics of Metals and Materials Science. After successfully graduating from graduate school from 1975 to 2013, she worked at Lviv Polytechnic as a junior researcher at the research laboratory, assistant, senior lecturer, associate professor, professor (2006) of the Department of Engineering Materials Science and Applied Physics. Since 2012 — Head of the Department of Applied Materials Science and Materials Processing, National University "Lviv Polytechnic." Since 2015, Professor ZA Duryagina He also teaches at the Department of Engineering and Technical Sciences of the John Paul II Catholic University in Lublin (Poland).

In 1978, she defended her dissertation for the degree of Candidate of Technical Sciences—"The influence of the structure of stainless steels on corrosion resistance and the tendency to cracking in the conditions of sulfur smelting."

In 2005, she defended her dissertation for the degree of Doctor of Technical Sciences—"Regularities of creating barrier layers with a controlled structural-phase state to optimize the properties of structural materials of power equipment."

She has published 275 scientific papers in the fields of metallurgy, materials science, solid state physics and surface engineering, the lion's share of which are articles in professional journals, including 55 articles in journals indexed in Scopus and Web of Science databases.

== See also ==
- Lviv Polytechnic National University
- Shevchenko Scientific Society

== Sources ==
- Б.С. Рильніков, С.Г. Швачко. Кафедра інженерного матеріалознавства та прикладної фізики: До 135-річчя заснування. — Львів: Видавництво Національного університету "Львівська політехніка", 2007. — 108 с.
- Дурягіна Зоя Антонівна (вікі: Електронна енциклопедія «Львівської політехніки»)
- "Zoia Duriagina". Eastern-European Journal of Enterprise Technologies.
