= Dzyga Art Center =

Arts center and group in Lviv

Coordinates: 49.84334°N 24.03384°E

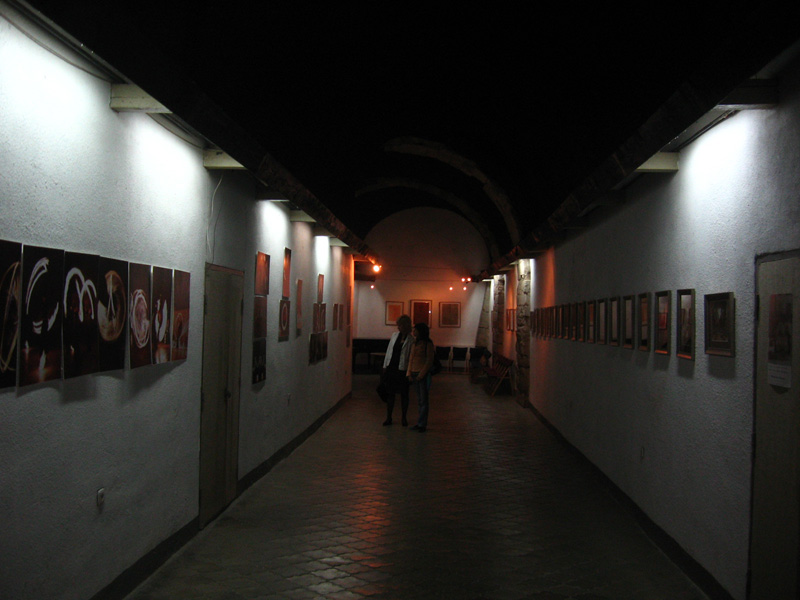
The interior of the gallery

The Dzyga Art Center is an artistic association, gallery, theater and concert facility in Lviv, Ukraine.

== Activities ==
Dzyga showcases and produces in the genres of art, music, literature, holds theater plays and displays various films.

== History ==
The Dzyga Art Center was founded in June 1993 by members of the student brotherhood of Lviv (Markiyan Ivaschysyn, Andriy Rozhniatovsky, Yaroslav Ruschyshyn, Andrian Klisch) and famous Lviv artists (Serhiy Proskurnia, Vlodko Kaufman). The Dzyga Art Center was opened in the former monastery of the Dominican Order in March 1997.

== Main projects ==
- Jazz folk festival "Flyugery Lvova"
- Jazz festival "Jazz Bez"
- Ethnofestival "Pidkamin'" 2007-2008
- "Tyzhden aktualnogo mystetstva"
- Ukrainian-Polish cultural exchange "L2"
- International arts festival "Fort.Missia"
- Literary internet museum "Zhyvi holosy"

Dzyga is a co-organizer of the International Publishers' Forum, which helped establish Lviv as the book capital of Ukraine.

The association has organized a large number of events involving leading artists from Ukraine, Poland, Austria, Slovakia, the Czech Republic, USA, Russia and Japan.

Dzyga founded the first informal radio station in Ukraine, named Radio Initsiatyva, on which figures of Ukrainian journalism and public life, including Roman Chaika, Mykhailo Barbara, Marta Bilska, Kostya Bondarenko and others spoke out. Dzyga founded the oppositional newspaper, named Lvivska Gazeta.

In its projects, in particular in the project "Ye" (1995), Dzyga collaborated with future stars and famous music groups, such as "Pikkardiyska Tertsiya", "Okean Elzy", "Plach Jeremyi", "Mertvy Piven", "Vohni Velykoho Mista", "Dzyga Jazz Quintet", "ShockolaD", Ruslana and others.

The most popular literary project of Dzyga was the magazine "Chetver", edited by the avant-garde Ukrainian writer Yuriy Izdryk.

The club "Lialka" was founded by Dzyga, a famous place in artistic circles, lasting from 1998 to 2008. The club was ended with the intention of keeping Lialka infamous.

One of their main projects has the vision of introducing viewers to modern European photography.

Ethnoclub Nabutkiv is an art school, attracting musicians and fans of ethnic culture. One of its focal points is ancient music, as well as performances of traditional and ethnic Ukrainian music.

"Jazz Club. Lviv " has earned Lviv the title of jazz city amongst musicians. The school was created with the goal of educating young musicians and organizing events between different jazz schools.

== Statistics ==
During its existence, the art center was credited with organizing around 1000 events, the most famous of which were: "Vyvykh", festivals "Ukrainska Molod Chrestovi", "Novyi Noyev Kovcheh", "Sluchay Ukrainske!", music and literary project "Ye".

Summing up the results in the 15th anniversary in 2008, Dzyga received the following statistics: 394 exhibitions, 1,223 club concerts, 119 exclusive concert projects, 26 festivals, 117 performances, 360 literary presentations, gathering 1,5 million participants, visitors and spectators.

== Partners ==
- Gallery "Dzyga"
- Literary cafe "Kabinet"
- Magazine "Chetver"
- Galician cafe "Pid synioyu fliashkoyu"
- Art cafe "Pid kleposydroyu"
- "Jazz club.Lviv"

== Administration ==
- Markiyan Ivaschyshyn, director of the Dzyga Art Center
- Volodymyr Kaufman, art director.

== See also ==
- Serhiy Proskurnia
