= Władysław Zajączkowski =

Polish mathematician

- Born: 12 April 1837; Strzyżów, Austrian Empire
- Died: 7 October 1898 (aged 61); Lwów, Austria-Hungary
- Occupation: Mathematician

Władysław Zajączkowski (April 12, 1837, in Strzyżów near the Rzeszów – October 7, 1898, in Lwów) was a Polish mathematician. Professor of Warsaw Main School, Imperial University of Warsaw (now University of Warsaw), Technical Academy in Lviv (now Lviv Polytechnic; twice a rector). Member of Polish Academy of Learning and French Academy of Sciences. He was specialising mainly in mathematical analysis and differential equations.
