= Serhiy Proskurnia =

Ukrainian stage director (1957–2021)

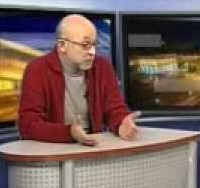
- Born: Serhiy Vladyslavovych Proskurnia; 28 November 1957; Lviv, Lviv Oblast, Ukrainian SSR
- Died: 1 February 2021 (aged 63)
- Occupation: Stage Director

Serhiy Vladyslavovych Proskurnia (Ukrainian: Сергій Владиславович Проскурня; 28 November 1957 – 1 February 2021) was a Ukrainian stage director.

== Biography ==
Proskurnia's parents were Vladyslav Andriyovych Proskurnia and Emilia Oleksandrivna Proskurnia, both engineers. He attended Lviv Children's Music School before his family moved to Cherkasy, where he continued his studies at the Cherkasy Secondary School No. 8. He also wrote music for the Cherkasy Regional Music and Drama Theater, although the artistic council did not accept his music. He then created a radio studio for his school and would regularly visit Moscow and Leningrad to observe theatrical and musical life.

In 1979, Proskurnia met Elena Kamburova, and began organizing her Kyiv concerts two years later. He entered the Kyiv National I. K. Karpenko-Kary Theatre, Cinema and Television University and joined the Національна спілка театральних діячів України in 1980. From 1985 to 1987, he was an intern at the Ivan Franko National Academic Drama Theater, sponsored by the Soviet Ministry of Culture. In 1990, he participated in the Revolution on Granite, attempting to free Ukraine from communism. In 1993, he co-founded the Dzyga Art Center. Throughout the 1990s, he collaborated with the International Renaissance Foundation and repeatedly met with its founder, George Soros. He served on the board of the Soros Center for Contemporary Art at the National University of Kyiv-Mohyla Academy.

In the 2000s, he participated in a number of international conferences, such as the International Association of Theatre Critics and Congresses of the International Theater Institute in Athens and Manila. In 2009, he served as General Director of the Odesa Opera and Ballet Theater. In 2013 and 2014, he led a film project titled "Our Shevchenko", much of which was shot during Euromaidan. On 9 March 2014, the 200th birthday of Taras Shevchenko, his film Тарас Шевченко. Ідентифікація was released. He directed an oratorio titled "God is with us". It was dedicated to those who died during Euromaidan and during the War in Donbass. It was displayed in Sophia Square on the 23rd anniversary of Ukrainian independence.

In 2015, Proskurnia began directing holiday concerts on Independence Day of Ukraine. For these events, he invited conductor Kirill Karabits, but some of his directorial decisions were heavily criticized. In 2016, his concert was dominated by Russian composers, which caused criticism of the Kapranov brothers. His decisions to play Sergei Prokofiev and Pyotr Ilyich Tchaikovsky were denounced. In 2017, he invited Russian opera singer Maria Maksakova Jr., which was criticized by critic Oleksiy Kurinnyi.

Serhiy Proskurnia died on 1 February 2021, at the age of 63.
