= Antoni Wereszczyński =

Polish colonel (1890–1953)

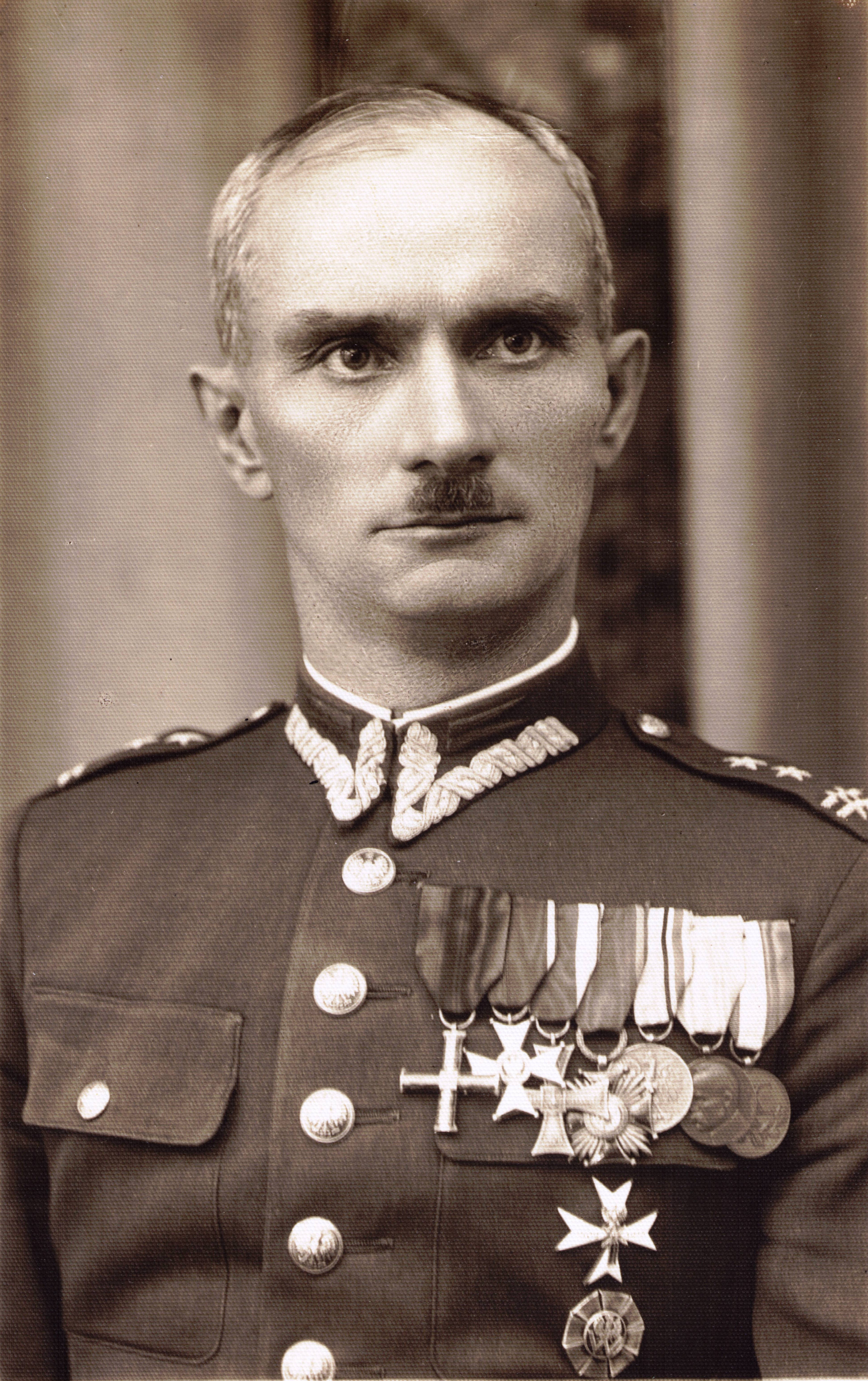
- Antoni Wereszczyński
- Born: 17 December 1890
- Died: 4 September 1953 (aged 62); Warsaw
- Burial place: Bydgoszcz
- Military career
- Allegiance: Polish Land Forces
- Branch: Artillery
- Service years: 1923–1953
- Rank: Colonel
- Awards: Virtuti Militari; Cross of Independence; Cross of Valor; Golden cross of merit

Antoni Wereszczyński (17 December 1890 – 4 September 1953) was a Colonel in the Polish Army.

== Biography ==
=== Career ===
In 1923, he served in the 22nd Field Artillery Regiment in Rzeszów, Poland, and in 1924 in the branch office in charge of the School for non-commissioned officers, while remaining an officer, serving in 22nd Regiment Light Artillery. Four years later, he commanded the 1st Light Artillery Regiment of the legions in Vilnius. In 1932 he served as Chief Officer in 1st Group of artillery Headquarters in Warsaw. In June 1934 he was appointed commander of the 14th Light Artillery Regiment in Poznań.

In August 1939, he commanded the 25th Regiment of Light Artillery in Kalisz, then became Commander of the 25th Artillery Infantry Division.

=== Death ===
In September 1939 he fought at "Bzura" and the Siege of Warsaw. He was captured when Warsaw fell to the Germans, and was imprisoned in the German prison camp "Oflag in Marburg". Released in 1945, he returned to Poland and the Polish Army, where he served as Artillery Officer in Bydgoszcz in Pomeranian Military District. He died on 4 September 1953 at hands of the communist Intelligence Service during a brutal interrogation in the Main Directorate of Information of the Polish Army in Warsaw. There is a symbolic tomb located in the Powązki Military Cemetery in Warsaw. His remains are interred in Bydgoszcz.

== Ranks ==
- Captain – revised 3 May 1922 active from 1 June 1919
- Major – 18 February 1928 active from 1 January 1928
- Lieutenant Colonel
- Colonel

== Decorations ==
- Silver Cross of War Virtuti Militari
- Cross of Independence
- Cross of Valor
- Golden cross of merit
- Medal Międzysojuszniczy "Medaille Interalliee"
