= Ukrainian folklore =

Folklore of ethnic Ukrainians

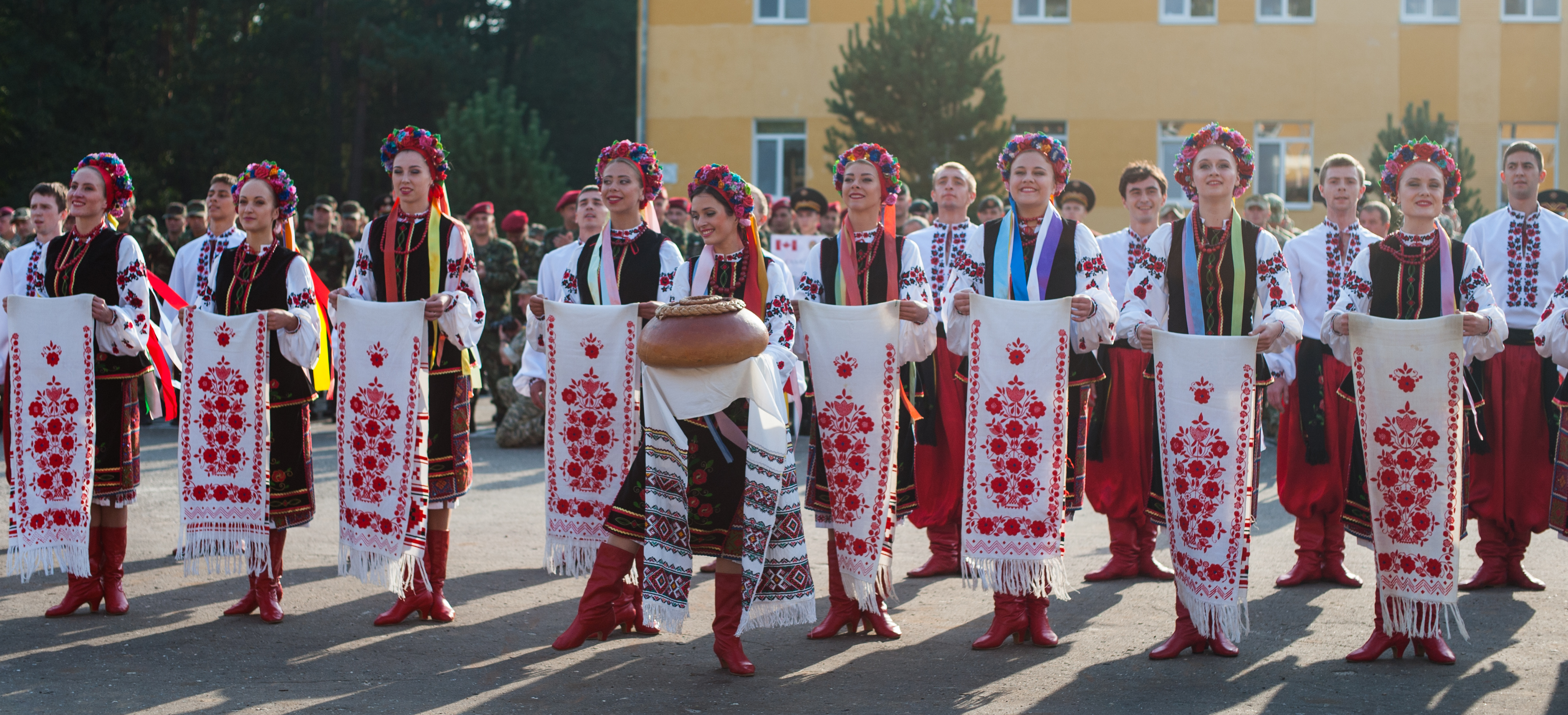
Traditional Ukrainian clothes, salt and bread and rushnyk.

Ukrainian folklore is the folk tradition which has developed in Ukraine and among ethnic Ukrainians. The earliest examples of folklore found in Ukraine is the layer of pan-Slavic folklore that dates back to the ancient Slavic mythology of the Eastern Slavs. Gradually, Ukrainians developed a layer of their own distinct folk culture. Folklore has been an important tool in defining and retaining a cultural distinctiveness in Ukraine in the face of strong assimilatory pressures from neighboring lands.

== Distinctiveness ==
Ukrainian folk customs have numerous layers defined by the period in which that aspect developed and the area in which it was exploited. The lowest and oldest level is the pan-Slavic layer of folk culture which has many elements that are common to the Slavic people in general. Above that are elements common to the Eastern Slavs, and above that are elements found only in Ukraine itself. The layer above this contains cultural and folkloric elements that define the various micro-groups of the Ukrainian ethos such as the Boykos, Cossacks, Hutsuls, Lemkos, Lyshaks, Podolians and Rusyns.

== Folk customs ==
Ukrainian folk customs and rites were rituals connected with the calendar and with the course of human life. They were often accompanied by religious ceremonies, incantations, folk songs, dances, and dramatic plays. Life cycle rituals mark birth, marriage, and death. Many of these customs are ancient and have blended in many cases with Christian rites. They can be divided into three categories:

- familial customs and rites - which consist of birth, wedding, and burial rites
- seasonal-productive customs and rites - which are tied to farming, herding, and hunting tasks
- communal customs and rites - which mark certain events in the life of the community

Folk customs have undergone many changes in Ukraine as modern culture was introduced. Under the Soviets, folk customs were unsuccessfully suppressed. Believers still practiced the Christian customs, and some people in the country even revived the ancient customs and rites. Many Christian rites have been revived in post-Soviet Ukraine after 1991, especially in western oblasts.

== Folk dances ==
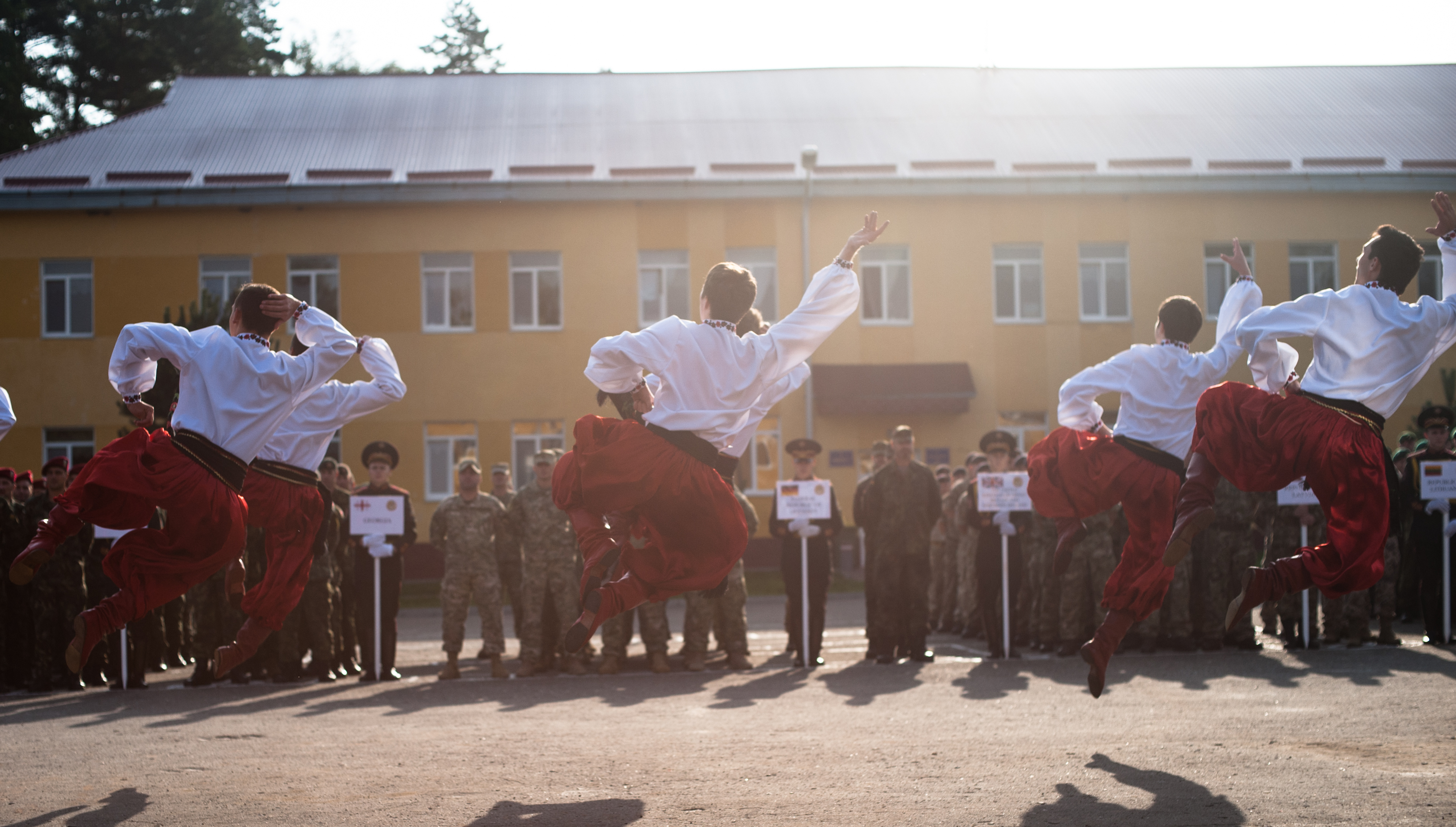
Hopak

Dance has existed in Ukraine as a ritual since ancient times, but it was mostly absorbed by Christianity and blended with Christian rituals. The earliest dances were circle dances concerned with agriculture. Dances took place on Ivan Kupala day, St. George's day, Pentecost, days of harvest, and weddings. Ritual dances were rarely performed to music, and usually to a chant. Folk dances were performed with or without music. The majority of Ukrainian folk dances are circular. Some of the most famous dances are the Arkan and Hopak. Dance was also enriched with traditional Ukrainian folk dress. Today many Ukrainian dance groups exist in Ukraine and the Ukrainian diaspora, particularly in Canada, and have kept the tradition of folk dancing alive.

== Folk songs ==
Ukrainian folk songs can be divided into four basic groups:

- ritual songs - such as carols (koliadky and shchedrivky), spring songs, songs about nymphs (rusalka songs), and Kupala festival songs
- harvest songs and wedding songs
- historical songs and political songs - such as dumas and ballads
- lyrical songs - such as family songs, social class songs, and love songs

Ukrainian folk songs contain an abundance of symbolism. Bird symbolism is popular. The eagle or falcon is the symbol of manliness, power, beauty, courage, and freedom. The dove symbolizes femininity. The sea gull is the symbol of the suffering mother. Other symbols include the viburnum opulus or guelder-rose (kalyna), which represents a beloved girl or Ukraine itself, and the oak which represents the boy. In songs similes predominate: a girl is compared to a star, a red guelder-rose tree, a pine tree, and a poppy; a boy is compared to an oak, a maple, and a pigeon. Some songs make use of repetition, antithesis, hyperbole, and metaphor. A technique often used in lyrical songs to express emotion is the dramatic dialogue. In some folk songs assonance, alliteration, and onomatopoeia are also used.

Folk songs have provided inspiration for many Ukrainian composers, such as Mykola Lysenko, Mykola Leontovych, and Kyrylo Stetsenko. The famous Russian composers Peter Tchaikovsky, Nikolai Rimsky-Korsakov, and Serge Rachmaninoff also collected and used Ukrainian folk melodies in their works. Today many folk songs are still used, and are even used by contemporary artists.

== Folk tales ==
Kazka (Ukrainian: казка) is the Ukrainian word for fairy tale. There are common motifs in Ukrainian folk tales, with many involving animals. While many Ukrainian folk tales bear influence from cultural exchange with the greater pan-Slavic culture, they retain their unique Ukrainian character and identity. Many Ukrainian fairy tales developed during a time when people were farmers and hunters, with children growing up around "fierce animals roaming the forests" that could be dangerous. Additionally, children had to learn early the importance of caring for animals and crops because failure meant going hungry until the next year.

Ukrainian folk tales have provided inspiration for numerous works of art. Many Ukrainian kazkas have been retold in Ukrainian animation, with folklore identified as a key trait of Ukrainian animation. The first Ukrainian animation in 1927 was the retelling of one such kazka, "The Fairy Tale of the Straw Bull.". They remain an inspiration for many artists today. Children's author Jan Brett's English language retelling of the Ukrainian fairy tale, "The Mitten", has become a bestselling classic. The development of Ukrainian folk tales has also been subject to academic analysis.

== See also ==
- Slavic paganism
- Ukrainian wedding traditions
