= Ukrainian animation =

Straw Bull or Chaff Goby, the first Ukrainian animation, 1927, created by Vyacheslav Levandovskyi (b. 1897 d. 1962)

Ukrainian animation, which began in the late 1920s, is part of Ukrainian cinematography and has involved a variety of techniques, including frame-by-frame filming, time lapse, and computer animation.

== Ukraine SSR ==
=== Early history (1920s–1930s) ===
Ukrainian animation's founder is considered to be Viacheslav Levandovsky (b. Odesa, February 24, 1897, d. Kyiv, April 18, 1962). The history of Ukrainian animation began in 1926 when the animation studio of the All-Ukrainian Photo Cinema Administration was established. Shortly after, in 1927, Vyacheslav Lewandowski beginning his animation career in Odesa, created the silent film puppet cartoon "Chaff Goby (Shazka o solomennon bychke or Solomennyi Biychok)" also translated "The Tale of the Straw Bull", based on the Ukrainian folk tale, Straw Bull, and story by Oleksandr Oles. However, the film has now been lost, and the only parts that we know about it were a few shots described by Oleksandr Shimon, a person who watched the film:

We saw several cartoon characters, small paper figures of animals, consisting of hinged parts. They still amaze us with their expressiveness and filigree, and how they perfectly reproduce the illusion of movement.

— Oleksandr Shimon

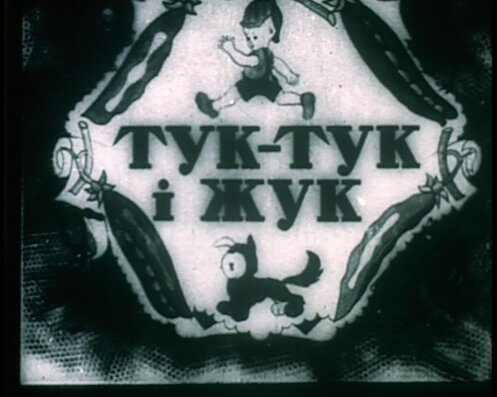
Tuk-Tuk and Zhuk (film still, 1935)

Vyacheslav Lewandowski continued his career in Kyiv, with The Tale about the Squirrel Hostess and the Mouse Villain (Shazka o belle khoziaushke I myshke zlodeike) in 1928. He created approximately twelve other works of animation, including the 1927 "Ukrainization" about the introduction of the Ukrainian language as an official language in Ukraine, and starting work in 1928 on the later-completed "Tuk-Tuk and his friend Zhuk" about a boy who grows vegetables with his dog named Zhuk, with a pig and fox described as lazy and aggressive, encroaching on Tuk-Tuk's work in all possible ways. (Archival copy of this latter cartoon still exists and was shown at the Dovzhenko Center in 2017).

The All-Ukrainian Photo Cinema Administration, parent entity of Lewandowski's animation studio, was closed in the early 30's with many of its leaders imprisoned or executed to suppress a Ukrainian national revival in the 1930s. After its closure, the All-Ukrainian Photo Cinema Administration was recreated into the All-Ukrainian film industry trust, "Ukrainfilm". This move effectively ended the studio's independence, making it a branch of the Soviet Union's Soyuzkino.

Levandovsky was working on one of the first Ukrainian animation films with sound, Tuk-Tuk i yego priyatel Zhuk (translated either Tuk-Tuk and his friend Zhuk or Knok-Knok and his friend Beatle) in 1932 (The United States' Walt Disney Company had released its first animation with synchronized sound, Steamboat Willie, four years earlier in 1928). Levandovsky would continue work in Kyiv until 1936 and Moscow after 1933. In 1980, Ivan Ivanov-Vano claimed that Viacheslav Levandovsky could only be compared to Yuri Norstein.

In the years following the 1932–1933 Holodomor, in 1934 in Odesa, two of Lewandowski's young students, Semyon Guetsky (1902-1974) and Eugene Gorbach (1901-?), created the first Ukrainian graphic animated film, Murzilka in Africa, about a fairy tale character named Murzilka who goes to Africa to save a girl named Kane from oppression and cruelty. Started in 1928 by Lewandowski and finished by Guetsky and Gorbach in 1935, the 1936 Zhuk v zooparke (the Beatle in the Zoo) and the 1938 release of Tuk-Tuk and his friend Zhuk was the first attempt to create a serial animation character. Ippolit Lazarchuk (b. August 13, 1903, d. February 23, 1979) created the 1937 Lesnoy dogovor (The Wood Deal) and the 1938 Zapreschenny popugay (the Forbidden Parrot), but the anti-fascist film the Forbidden Parrot was not released.

=== Suspended animation (1940s) ===
Events in the 1940s including World War II virtually froze animation created by Ukraine. Oppression and the ongoing war diminished the animation base in the Ukrainian SSR. Consequently, development of Ukrainian animation was paused for decades. Only educational and science films were created by Kievnauchfilm until 1959. The 1945 Lost Letter animation about travels and temptations of a Ukrainian man delivering a letter from Ukraine to Moscow, while set in "Little Russia" (a name used by Russia for Ukraine) as referred to in the animation, was actually created by Moscow's Soyuzmultfilm animation studio.

=== Late 1950s rebirth ===
Ukrainian animation was reborn in the late 1950s, when animator Ipolyt Lazarchuk (b. August 13, 1903, d. February 23, 1979) together with Irina Gurvich and Nina Vasilenko began making cartoon animations. Lazarchuk's animation workshop group was in part responsible for the renaissance of Ukrainian animation. The film The Adventures of Pepper was released in 1961, made by a team which apparently didn't have experience animating prior to the making of The Adventures of Pepper. The cartoon tells the story of Pepper, a magazine employee who is approached by animals suffering from poachers who also pollute the forest and river. Although the studio that created Adventures of Pepper, Kievnauchfilm, was founded in 1941 to produce popular science films, its entry into animation would become what it was best known for.

=== 1960s–1970s ===
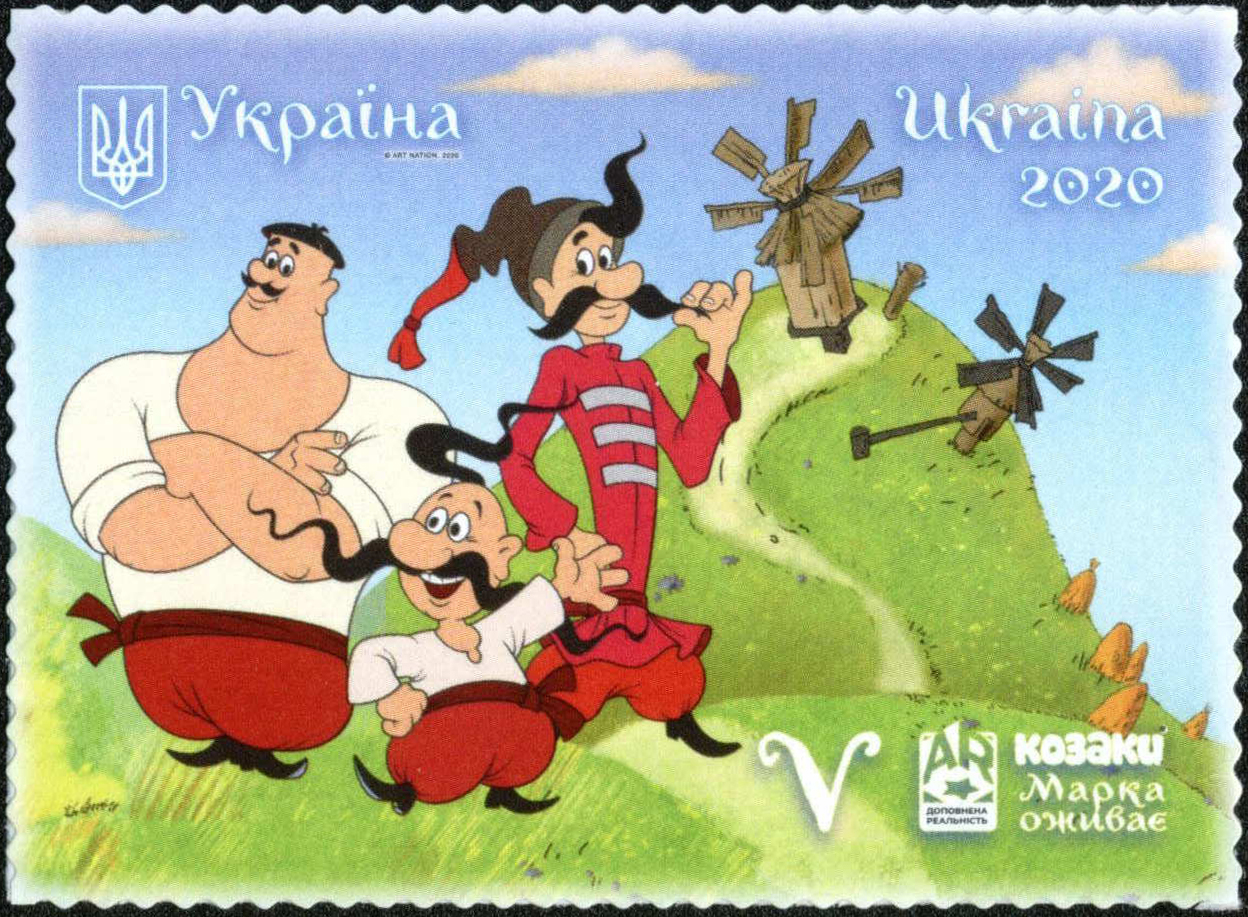
Dakhno's Cossacks on a Ukrainian post stamp

In 1967, the science film studio Kievnauchfilm, having additionally branched out into animation, received a letter from a now-unknown resident of Zaporizhzhia, pitching the studio to make a film called How the Cossacks Cooked Kulish. The success of the resulting film, now reimagined as a cartoon by Volodymyr Dakhno, kickstarted the Cossacks animation franchise for Kievnauchfilm, and for Ukraine.

Volodymyr Dakhno drew a long stick for me and said that it was the cossack Grai, the big circle was the strongman Tur, the small one was the agile Oko. As an animator, I made characters out of his ideas. He created faces for them, grew bodies. He made them what everyone knows them today. By the way, not everyone knows that at first there was an idea to make a feature film about the Cossacks, but nothing came of this idea. As a result, they decided to make a cartoon. Nobody thought that something serious could come out of it.

— Eduard Kirich, an artist and designer of the Cossacks

Other cartoons in the series included How the Cossacks played football, How the Cossacks liberated the brides, How the Cossacks bought salt, How the Cossacks became Olympians, How the Cossacks helped the musketeers, and How the Cossacks played hockey. There were initially nine cartoons in total.

Soviet censors banned work, withheld financing from, or punished artists who did not fit party interests. The Communist Party had wanted to portray the Cossacks cartoon characters instead as Red Army soldiers. Folktales used in cartoons during this period in the 1970s and 1980s, such as in Cossacks, were altered for Soviet ideology. Natalie Kononenko wrote:

"They not only criticized capitalism, but also depicted women as sexless and self-sacrificing, and urged cooperation, neighborliness, and non-violence. National minorities within the Soviet Union were portrayed as backward and in need of the guidance of Russia, the leading Soviet republic. Ukrainians for example, were shown as cute and quaint, living in a bucolic land. Colorful clothing and tasty foods were attributed to them, as well as the ability to sing and dance. However, they were also seen as a people who believed in spirits and did not understand modern life."

As compared to the Moscow animation studio, Soyuzmultfilm, which sought realism in the model of Disney (so much so that western animators avoided the Moscow International Film Festival for fears of copying and piracy), Ukrainian animators at Kyivnaukfilm sought a distinct style, refusing to imitate. They instead focused more on aesthetics and concept, leading to new styles and techniques that were more conceptual and experimental, emphasizing artist individuality and originality in style. Key traits of Ukrainian-style animation were "vivid language, a connection with literature, pictorial art and folklore."

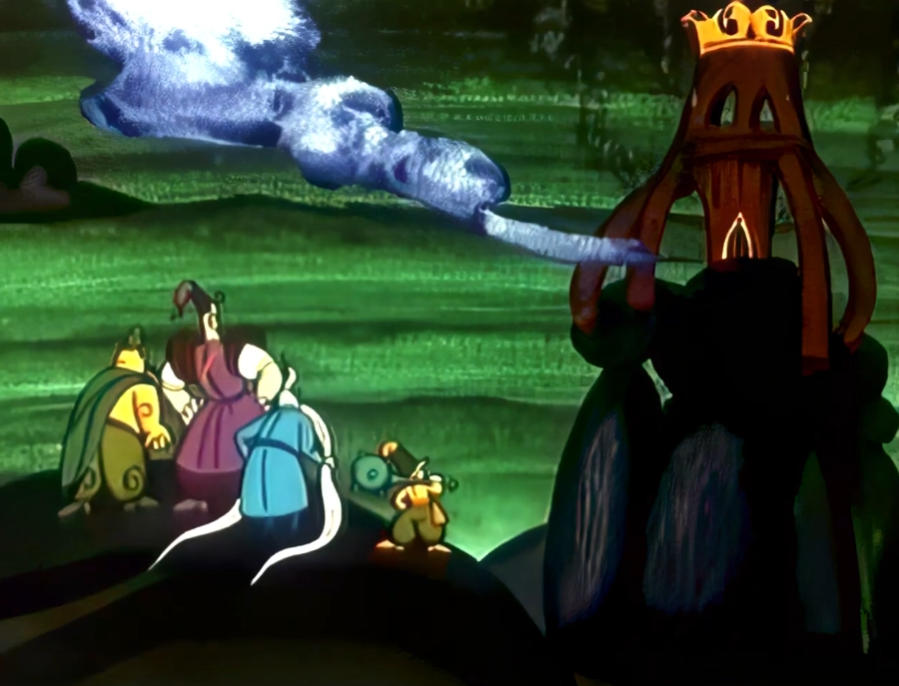
A still from Kotyhoroshko (1970)

The late sixties saw two folk tales turned into animations. In 1968, Kyivnaukfilm created a puppet animation of the Ukrainian folk tale, Ivasyk-Telesyk directed by Leonid Zarubin and written by Yukhym Chepovetskyi. In 1970, Kyivnaukfilm created a nine-minute animation based on the Ukrainian and Eastern European folk tale, Kotyhoroshko, with the animation written by Valeriy Guzhba, and directed by Borys Khranevych.

Later, in 1976, the Kievnauchfilm cartoon series Adventures of Captain Wrongel, directed by David Cherkassky, became one of the most well-known cartoons of the Soviet Union, based around a sea captain who competes in a regatta which is linked to a theft from a famed museum.

Alla Hrachova in 1976 wrote and produced "The Forest Song" (Лісова пісня), based on Lesya Ukrainka's 1917/1918 play, The Forest Song.

=== 1980s ===
The cartoon Kapitoshka was released in 1980, and is about an unlikely friendship between a wolf and the fun-loving rain drop, Kapitoshka. A young wolf, reading a tutorial about how to become a scary wolf, chases and eventually catches Kapitoshka to cook him. Kapitoshka escapes in a variety of ways, turning the pursuit into a game leading the wolf to concede futility. The two eventually become friends before Kapitoshka retreats in a rain cloud. In the 1989 sequel to the original, "Vozvrashaisya, Kapitoshka!" ("Come back, Kapitoshka!"), instead of from a book, it is this time the young wolf's aunt coaching him to be scary and fierce. Meanwhile, the young wolf dreams of again playing with his friend, Kapitoshka, and awaits a message from a crow.

In 1981, based on the children's novel by Lewis Carroll, the cartoon Alice in Wonderland was released by Kyivnaukfilm in three parts on Ukrainian television.

The popular 1982 cartoon animation, Once Upon a Dog, (Once Upon a Time, There Lived a Dog, Russian: "Жил-был пёс", Ukrainian: Жив-був пес or transliterated "Zhil-byl Pyos"), while based on the Ukrainian folk tale "Sirko" (Ukrainian: "Сірко"), was created by Moscow's Soyuzmultfilm studio.

Kyiv's Kievnauchfilm studio in 1984 shot the cartoon How Petryk Pyatochkin Counted Little Elephants (Yak Petryk Pyatochkin slonykiv rakhuvav, Ukrainian: Як Петрик П'яточкин слоників рахував, Russian: Как Петя Пяточкин слоников считал), written by the character-children's writer Natalia Guzeeva. In this cartoon, a playful kindergartner named Petryk Pyatochkin counts elephants to fall asleep, then has a dream about playing with elephants.

David Cherkassky made another 7-part cartoon, Dr. Aibolit was released in 1984 and produced by Kievnauchfilm. It's about a doctor who disinterestedly treats animals, regardless of their injuries - from scratches, cuts and simple bites to complicated surgical operations.

For the earlier produced Cossacks cartoon series, in 1988, Volodymyr Dakhno, Anatoliy Havrylov, and Eduard Kirych were awarded the Shevchenko National Prize of Ukraine for their work on the series.

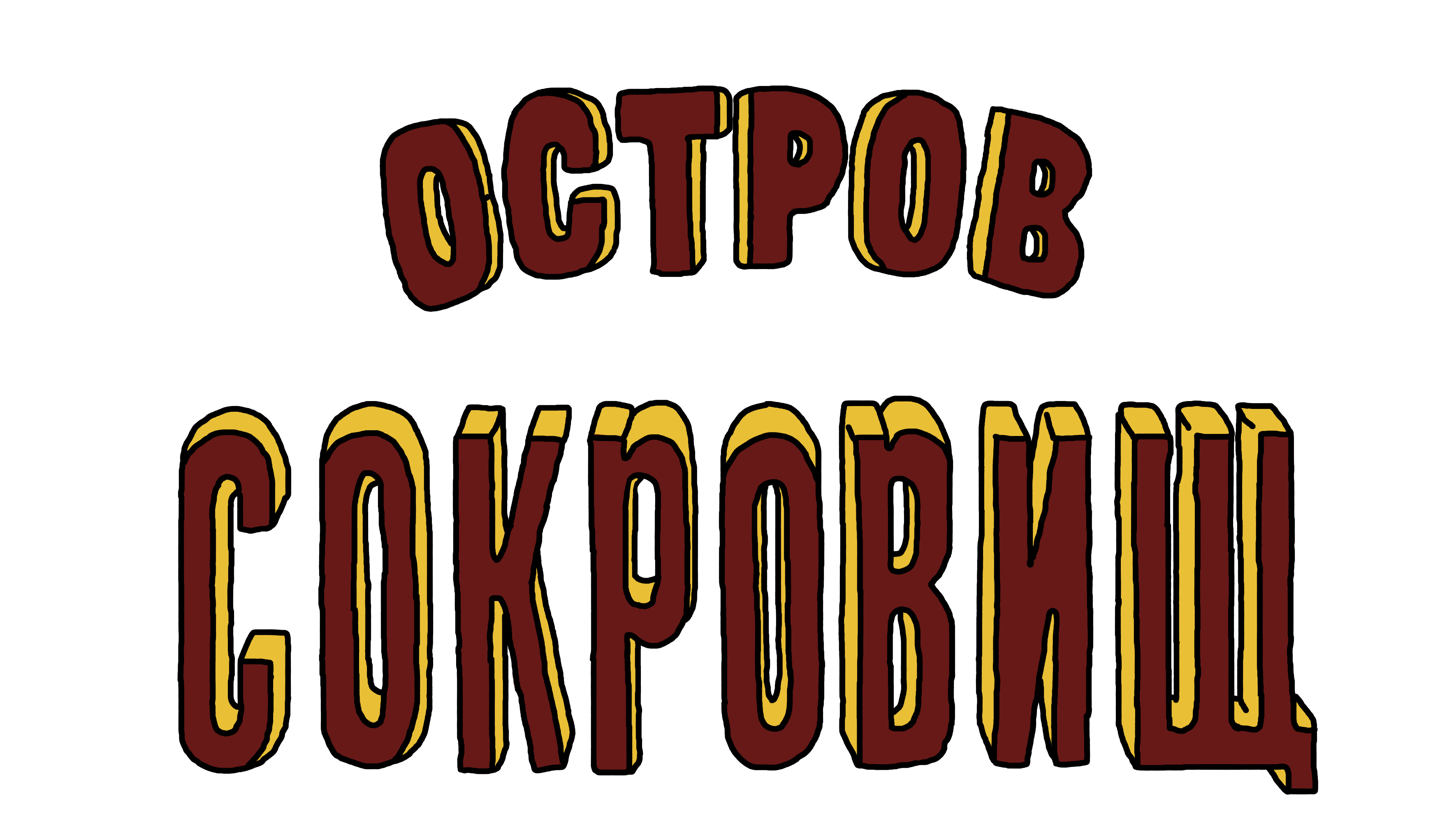
Logo of Treasure Island (1988)

Based on the 1880s Robert Louis Stevenson novel by the same name, the 107 minute animated film, Treasure Island, was released by Kievnauchfilm in the late 1980s, directed by David Cherkassy, and released in English in the United States in 1992 as a 72-minute dubbed version.

In 1989, Alla Hrachova directed a Kyivnaukfilm cartoon animation of the Ukrainian folk tale, Ivasyk-Telesyk, with cinematography by Anatoliy Havrylov.

Producing between 150 and 250 minutes of animation each year, by 1991, Ukraine SSR's Kievnauchfilm was the second-largest animation studio in the Soviet Union, with only Soyuzmultfilm producing more animations.

== Modern Ukraine ==
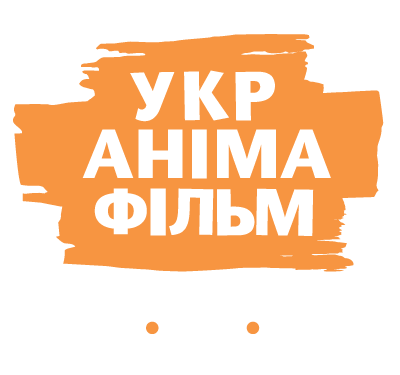
UkrAnimaFilm logo, descendent animation studio of Kyivnaukfilm

=== 1990s–2000s ===
The first Ukrainian animated film to premiere in independent Ukraine was Volodymyr Dakhno's television film Eneida based upon an eponymous poem by Ivan Kotliarevsky. Its animation style was influenced by Dakhno's previous Cossacks series.

After the collapse of the Soviet Union, many of Kyivnaukfilm's archives were lost or destroyed. Following Ukrainian Independence Day in 1991, many animators made commercials and ads as government financing ceased. Nonetheless, the descendent company of KyivNaukFilm, UkrAnimaFilm, continued to create animation. In 1996, Ukranimafilm released the 19 minute animation, Viy, bassed on the novel by Nikolai Gogol, directed by Leonid Zarubin and Alla Grachyova with cinemotagraphy by Anatoliy Havrylov, and starring Bohdan Beniuk, Natalya Sumska, and Vasyl Mazur. Ukranima's first Ukrainian animated film to win the Berlin Film Festival's "Silver Bear" was the 2002 cartoon "The Tram Was Going, Number Nine", receiving awards in Yalta, Stutgart, Tallinn, and Kyiv as well. Creative partnerships with Western European entities resulted in the creation of new animations even during difficult times.

In addition to Kyivnaukfilm's successor, UkrAnimaFilm, other Ukrainian animation studios came into existence. The Borisfen Animation Studio was founded in 1990, and formed a partnership with France and the Fox Channel. The Kharkiv branch of Borisfen, created in 1997 established a partnership with Millimages. The Odesa Animation Studio was founded September 19, 1991.

In 2005 director Yevhen Syvokin released his animated short film Snow Will Cover the Roads..., created with the use of sand animation and subsequently awarded with numerous prizes. Syvokin's pupil Stepan Koval achieved success with his film The Tram Was Going, Number Nine, which in 2002 received the grand prize of KROK festival, and in 2003 was awarded the Slver Bear in Berlin. Koval has been known for mixing old and new traditions, as in his the 2005 stop-motion short film "Poverty" (Zlydni), a Russian-Ukrainian production based on a Hutsul fairytale. A pioneering product of Ukrainian animation during the 2000s was Mykyta the Fox, Ukraine's first animated series released between 2005 and 2007.

A separate genre of Ukrainian animation which emerged during the 1990s are animated music videos. In 1998 animation combinated with footage was used by director Olena Kasavina for Ruslana's song Ballad of a Princess, and next year a similar technology was employed by Maksym Papernyk for Natalia Mohylevska's song Moon. The first fully animated music video was created by Yuriy Zhuravel and Valeriy Tsveniuk for the 2002 song Woman Had No Trouble... by Ot Vinta!. In 1999 a political animation series Great Race was created by Kyiv studio Babych Design.

=== 2010–present ===
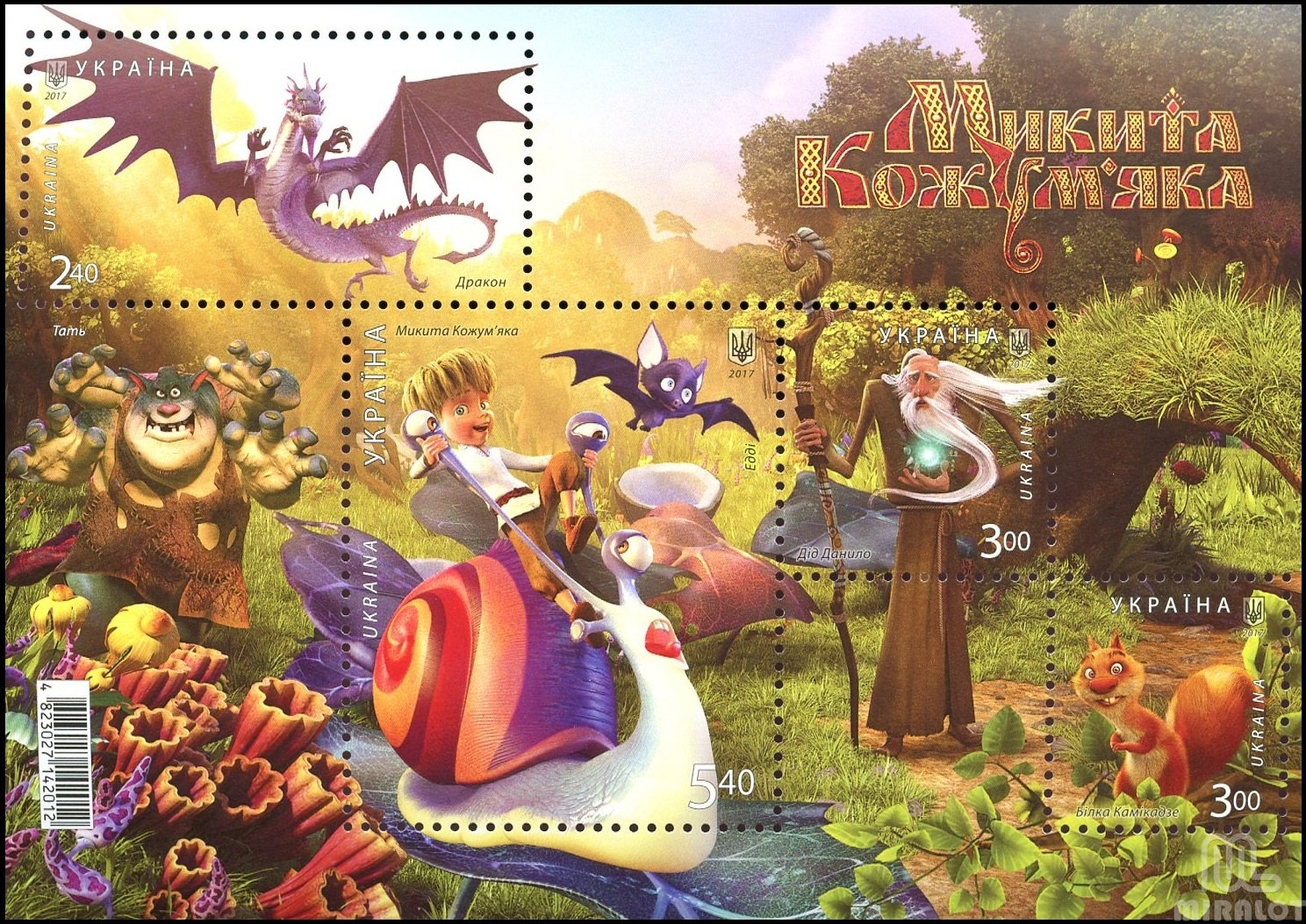
Ukrainian stamp depicting the heroes of Mykyta Kozhumyaka (2014)

Amon signature films of the Ukrainian short animation genre are Anatoliy Lavrenishyn's movies White Crow (2011) and Singing Birds Store (2013). The animation studio, Animagrad, was founded in Kyiv in 2012 and creates films for international audiences.

In 2014, UkrAnimaFilm released the first Ukrainian feature-length animated film called "Babai" and two years later the 3-D animated film Nikita the Tanner or The Dragon Spell, (Mykyta Kozhumyaka) which was shown at the Marche du Film in Cannes and won the National "Golden Top" award. 2013-2014 also saw the Ukranimafilm's release of an updated series based on the folktale, Kotyhoroshko, entitled, "Adventures of Kotyhoroshko and his friends" (Ukrainian: "Пригоди Котигорошка та його друзів"). This folk tale had previously been animated by Kyivnaukfilm in 1970. In 2016 and 2018, UkrAnimaFilm released two revival series of the earlier Cossacks cartoon series.

Focusing on children's content, in 2015, producer Michael Margulis and well-known children's writer Natalia Guzeeva together founded the Ukrainian animation studio, "studio KAPI". Its films include the 2016-2018 series "Myshko and Dzvinka"; the 2021 "Come Outside, Masha", "Tiger Is Strolling Around", "Papier-mâché", and the 2022 "Trouble Nubble Gum". The studio is also in development of a Lithuanian animation collaboration, Labra Cadabra. In 2021, Tiger is Strolling Around was selected for participation in numerous festivals including the Short Shorts Film Festival & Asia, LA Shorts International Film Festival, Montevideo World Film Festival, Odesa International Film Festival, LINOLEUM Animation Festival, Golden Short Film Festival, ZIFF, Kinokolo, Bardak Film Fest, Chicago International Children's Film Festival, Kamianets-Podilsky International Film Festival BRUKIVKA.

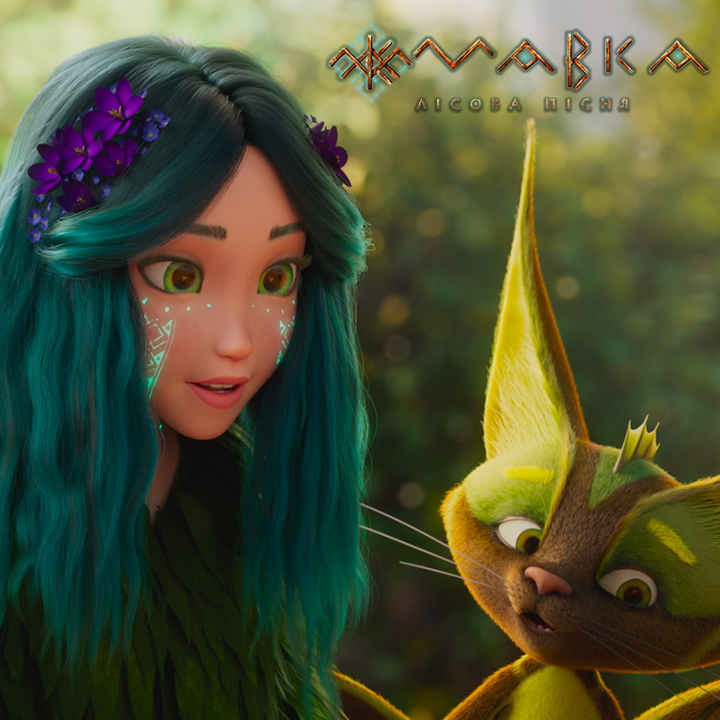
A frame from Mavka. The Forest Song (2023)

In 2017, Kharkiv residents worked together to create a stop-motion animation called Believe in Me about a dark-skinned girl named Matilda. The animation character Matilda dreams of becoming a pianist, like her grandfather, but her dentist parents decide that the daughter should devote herself instead to the medical profession. A ten-minute animation filmed at 30 frames per second, the community film was set to premier in fall 2017.

New Ukrainian animation works include Animagrad's The Stolen Princess (2018) and Clara & the Magic Dragon (2019). In 2022, the Ukrainian cartoon Stolen Moon. Kum, with director and screenwriter Olga Zakharova, won "Awards of Excellence" at the Canada Shorts Film Festival.

Mavka: The Forest Song (2023), was created based on Lesya Ukrainka's poetic play, The Forest Song, and produced by Ukraine's Animagrad Studio. The film had been presented at the Cartoon Movie European animation forum in 2017. At the 2023 Cleveland International Film Festival, Mavka: The Forest Song was a nominee for best feature film in the International Narrative Competition. The animated film, Mavka: The Forest Song featured characters in Ukrainian national folk costume along with a musical soundtrack performed by Ukrainian folk music group, DakhaBrakha, who were themselves animated into the film as village musicians.

== See also ==
- Cinema of Ukraine
- Kyivnaukfilm
- Ukrainian fairy tales
