= The Gigantic Turnip =

Russian and Ukrainian folktale

"Repka"
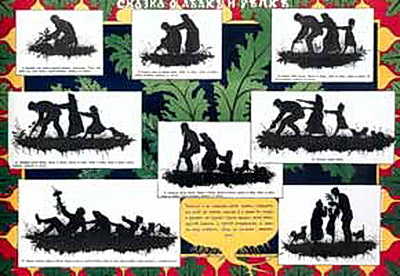
- Illustration by Elisabeth Boehm, 1887
- Original title: Репка
- Country: Russian Empire
- Genre: Fairy tale

Publication
- Published in: Народные русские сказки
- Media type: Print
- Publication date: 1863

"The Gigantic Turnip" or "The Enormous Turnip" (Russian: Репка, Repka, IPA: [ˈrʲepkə], lit. 'small turnip'; ATU 2044, ‘Pulling up the turnip') is a cumulative Russian fairy tale, collected in Arkhangelsk Governorate and published in 1863 by folklore researcher Alexander Afanasyev in his collection Russian Fairy Tales (tale number 89), a collection not strictly Russian, but which included stories from Ukraine and Belarus alongside Russian tales. The tale is well-known in Ukraine as adapted by Ivan Franko.

The story has been rewritten and adapted numerous times in other languages, for example Polish by Julian Tuwim; Bulgarian by Ran Bosilek, and English by Jan Brett.

== Plot ==
It is a chain tale, in which a grandfather plants a turnip, which grows so large that he cannot pull it up himself. He asks the grandmother for help, and they together still cannot pull it up. Successively their granddaughter and pets are recruited to help, until they finally pull the turnip up together. The specific ordering and set of people and animals varies. However, in the popular Russian version (based on the 1864 adaptation of Konstantin Ushinsky) their order is quite fixed, with rhythm and rhyme: it is the grandfather (dedka), the grandmother (babka), the granddaughter (vnuchka), the female-dog (zhuchka (Note: Some Slavic versions used the word "suchka" (female dog), but children's versions often replace that with "zhuchka", due to the former potentially having a negative connotation, much like the English word "bitch".)), the female-cat (koshka) and finally only with the help of the female-mouse (myshka) can the giant turnip (repka) be pulled up.

== Adaptations and retellings ==
Several versions for children have been penned, including by Konstantin Ushinsky (1864), Vladimir Dal (1870), and Aleksey Nikolayevich Tolstoy (1940).

A Hebrew version of the same folktale titled "Eliezer ve-ha-Gezer" ("Eliezer and the Carrot"), in which the identity of the root vegetable is changed to rhyme with the main character's name, has become a well known children's story in Israeli culture. It was published by Levin Kipnis as both a theatrical scene-poem (1930) and children's book (1964).

A Halloween-themed version of the story Big Pumpkin was written in 1992 by Erica Silverman and illustrated by S.D. Schindler.

It is retold as "The Turnip" by Barbara Suwyn in the World Folklore Series' The Magic Egg and Other Tales from Ukraine (1997), edited by Natalie Kononenko.

The fairy tale has had multiple treatments in English. One of the unfinished projects of award-winning illustrator Ezra Jack Keats was a version of "The Giant Turnip"; artwork for the book was published in the 2002 collection Keats's Neighborhood: An Ezra Jack Keats Treasury.

Children's author, Jan Brett, wrote that the inspiration for her English-language retelling of The Turnip was travel in 2011 through Russia, and chose animals as characters in her version.

"Rep-repa" is an adaptation of a fairy tale, performed by the cult Serbian mock-folk group Rokeri s Moravu. Released in 1991, the song "Rep repa" deals with the assonance of the words "rep" (rap, a musical genre) and "repa" (turnip), hence it is a form of parody of the hip-hop style of the era.

In the Chinese city of Tianjin, near the Tianjin Foreign Language University, there is a statue of children pulling out a giant turnip with a little help from animals. However, the statue lacks the figures of the grandparents.

== See also ==
- Ukrainian fairy tale
- James and the Giant Peach
- The Little Red Hen
- The Turnip
