= National Book Festival =

United States literary festival founded in 2001, organized by the Library of Congress

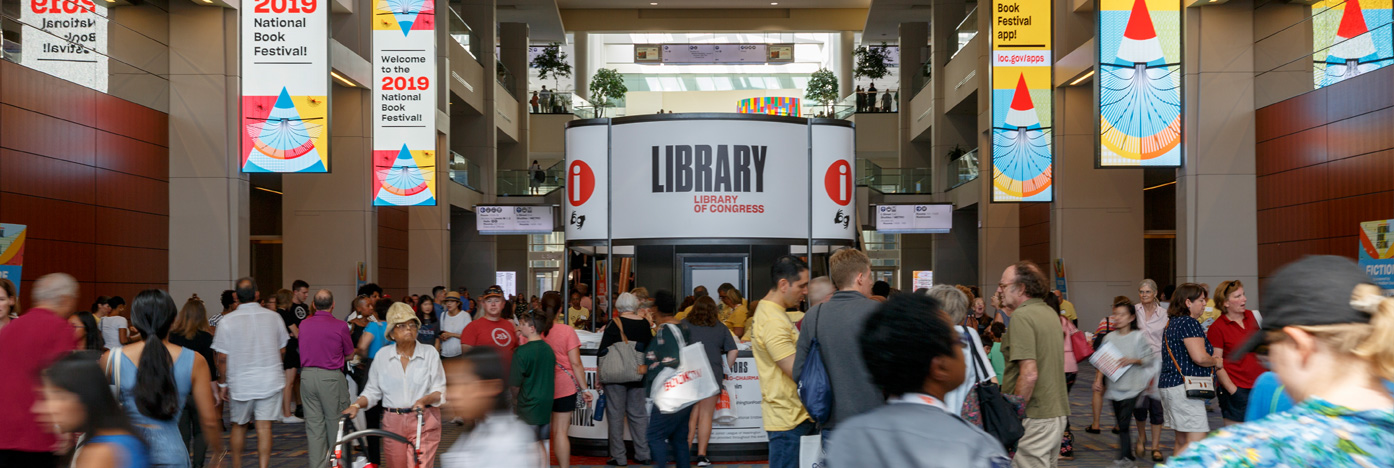
National Book Festival 2019

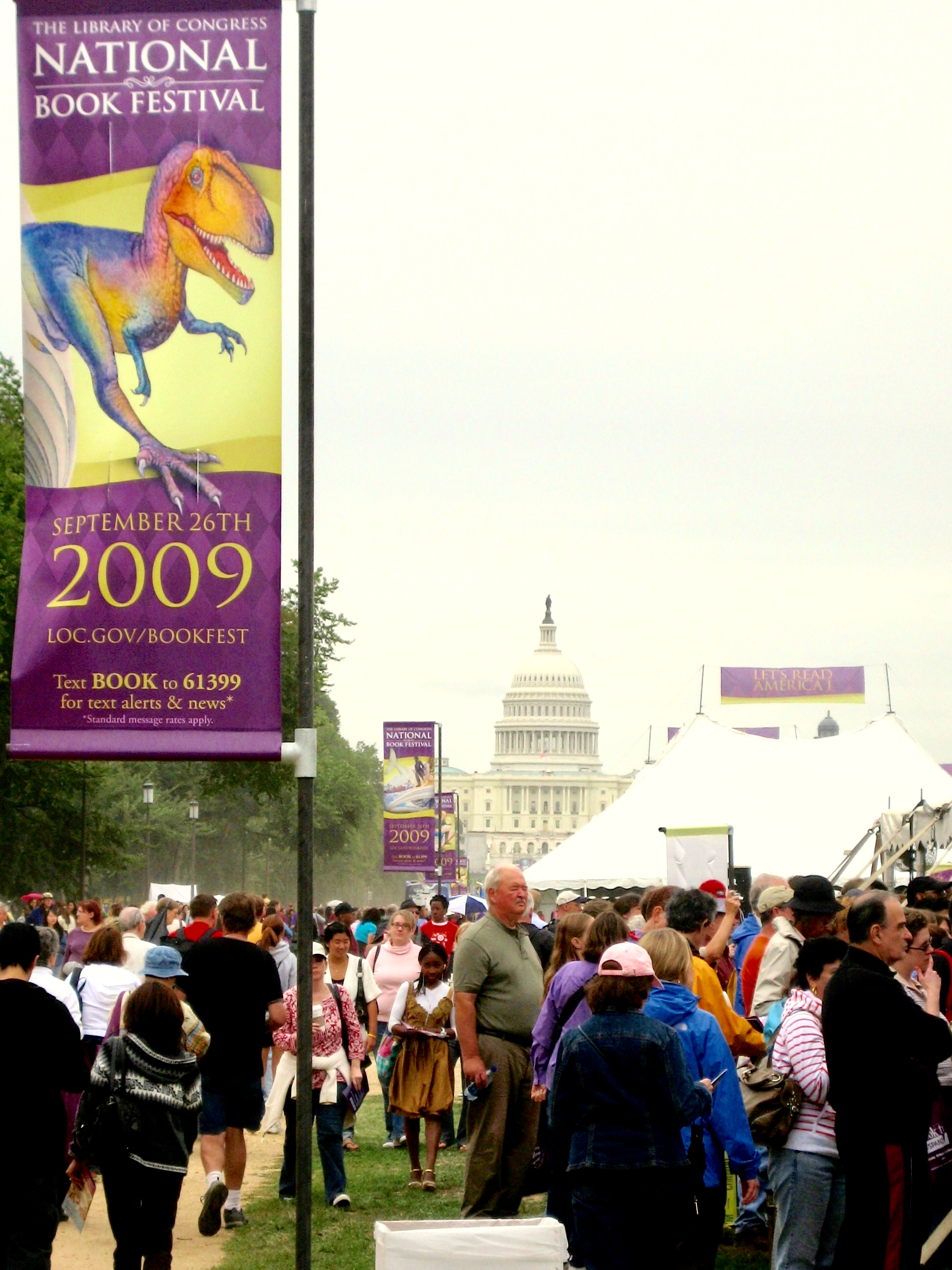
National Book Festival 2009

The National Book Festival is an annual literary festival held in Washington, D.C. in the United States; it is organized and sponsored by the Library of Congress, and was founded by Laura Bush and James H. Billington in 2001.

== Background ==
In 1995, the First Lady of Texas Laura Bush (a librarian) founded the Texas Book Festival with Mary Margaret Farabee and support of Robert S. Martin, then Director and Librarian of the Texas State Library and Archives Commission and other volunteers. The goal of the festival was to honor Texas authors, promote the joys of reading, and benefit the state's public libraries. The first Texas Book Festival took place in November 1996.

== History ==
As First Lady of the United States, Laura Bush worked with Librarian of Congress, James H. Billington, to create the National Book Festival. At a news conference announcing the inaugural event, Billington said: "We must all try, in every way we can, to send the message that reading is critical to our lives and to the life of our nation."

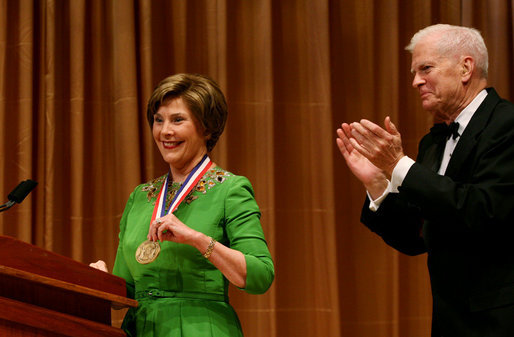
Laura Bush, founder and Honorary Chair of the National Book Festival 2001-2008, honored in 2008 by Dr. James Billington, Librarian of Congress

The first National Book Festival took place on September 8, 2001, at the Library of Congress and on the east lawn of the U.S. Capitol. The event featured more than 60 award-winning authors, illustrators and storytellers from across the country, including Stephen Ambrose, Natalie Babbitt, Robin Cook, Billy Collins, Sue Grafton, Larry L. King, David Levering Lewis, David McCullough, Walter Mosley, Katherine Patterson, Richard Peck, Gary Soto, and Scott Turow. Additional activities included book-signings, musical performances, storytelling, panel discussions, demonstrations of illustration and new technologies. Fifteen NBA players attended as representatives of the National Basketball Association's national reading campaign, "Read to Achieve." The first National Book Fair attracted between 25,000 and 30,000 visitors.

The Center for the Book provides "Great Reads from Great Places" book lists.

The 2002 Festival featured more than 70 authors, illustrators and storytellers from across the country and hosted more than 45,000 visitors on the West Lawn of the U.S. Capitol and the National Mall. A new addition to the Festival was the Pavilion of the States which highlighted regional books.

The 2003 National Book Festival attracted a crowd of more than 60,000 to the National Mall. Two new pavilions, Home & Family and Poetry, were added to the event.

The 2008 National Book Festival attracted a crowd of more than 120,000 visitors and about 70 well known authors, illustrators and poets. Participating authors included: Tiki Barber, Mary Brigid Barrett, Jan Brett, Geraldine Brooks, Sandra Brown, Dan Chiasson, Eleanor Clift, Philippa Gregory, Steven Kellogg, Katherine Paterson, Salman Rushdie, Bob Schieffer, Jon Scieszka, Alexander McCall Smith, R. L. Stine, and Gordon S. Wood.

Laura Bush served as honorary chair of the festival from 2001 through 2008.

In 2009 Barack Obama and Michelle Obama served as honorary co-chairs.

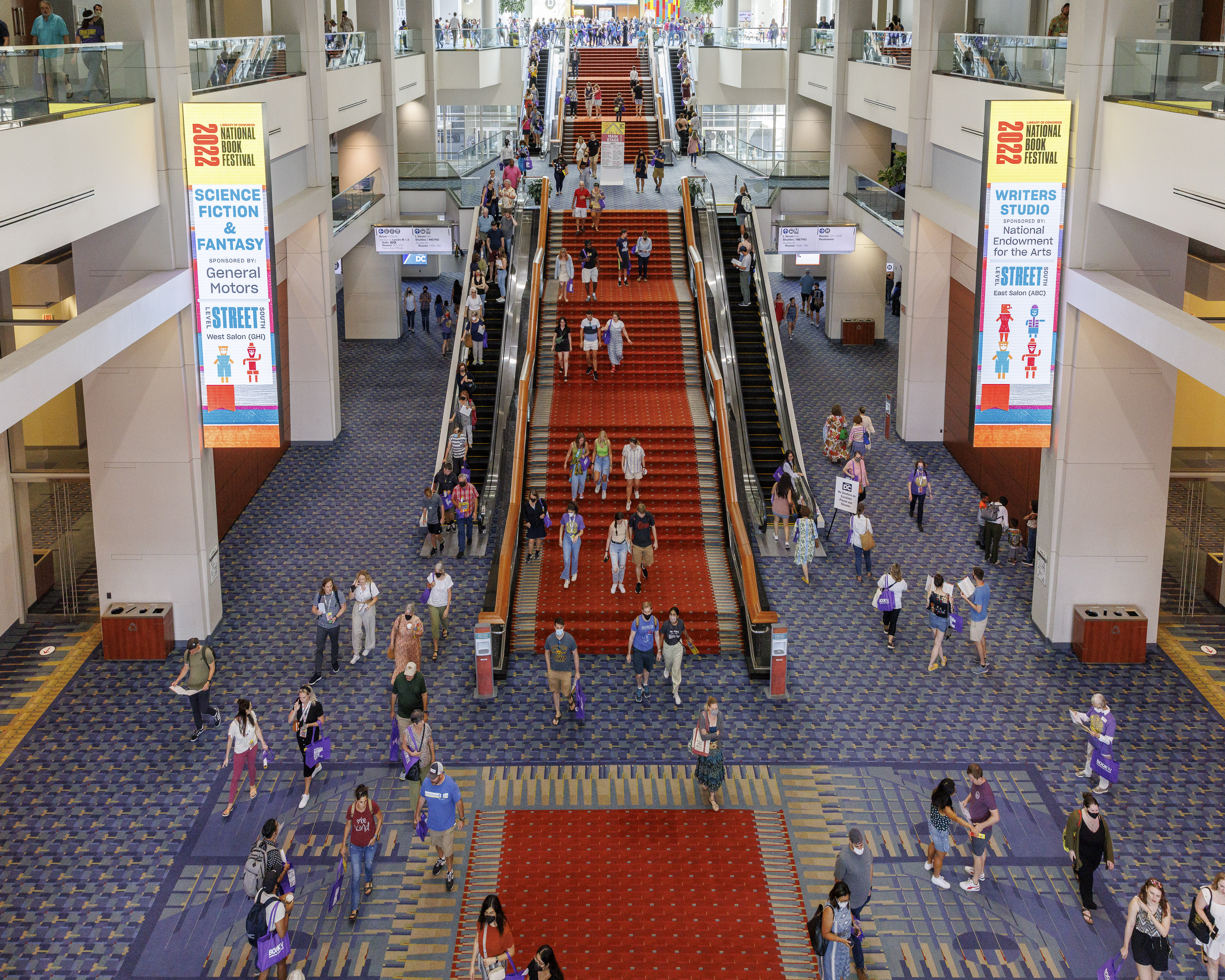
The 2022 National Book Festival at the Walter E. Washington Convention Center

After 12 years on the National Mall, the National Book Festival moved indoors to the Walter E. Washington Convention Center in 2014. More than 200,000 people attended the 2013 National Book Festival and, following that event, the National Park Service implemented new protocols and requirements to avoid damage to the grass on the National Mall. Stephen Lorenzetti, the Park Service's deputy superintendent for planning at the National Mall and Memorial Parks, said: "There are new procedures to make sure that the grass survives. This can make it more expensive for events to take place.... We worked closely with the library to allow the festival to continue at a reasonable cost. We showed them how they might use the walkways and the roadways. But in the end, the library decided that it was more affordable to move to a different venue. We respect their decision." Jennifer Gavin, project manager of the Library of Congress National Book Festival, confirmed the reason for the change of venue, saying: "We spent months working with the Park Service to see if we could make this work.... But when we looked at the costs — and they were considerable — we decided that the festival-goers would be better served by moving it into the convention center." The move indoors allowed the Festival to expand into night-time events, cookbook demonstrations, and screenings of film adaptations of books.

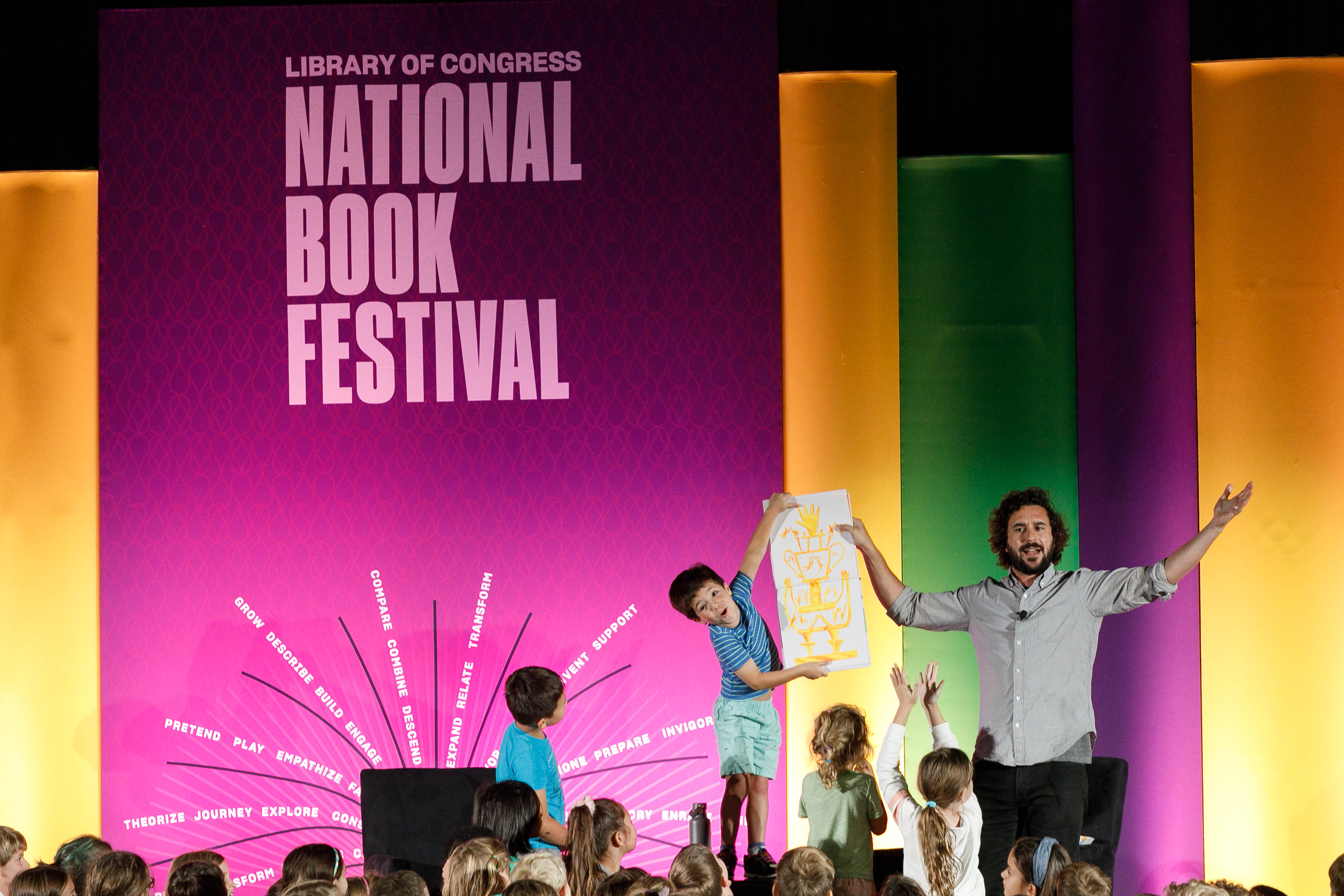
Adam Rubin gives a presentation for children at the National Book Festival, August 2019.

The Literary Director at the Library of Congress is Clay Smith.

Highlights of all the past festivals beginning in 2001 are at the Library of Congress website.

The 2024 National Book Festival took place on August 24. Main Stage speakers included Sandra Cisneros, James S.A. Corey, Doris Kearns Goodwin, Max Greenfield, Tamron Hall, Abby Jimenez, Casey McQuiston, James McBride, James Patterson, Lish Steiling and Rebecca Yarros. Many events were live-streamed.

The 2025 National Book Festival celebrated its 25th year and took place on September 6. Speakers included Justice Amy Coney Barrett, R. L. Stine, Geena Davis, Chimamanda Ngozi Adichie and Ron Chernow.

== Great Reads from Great Places ==
Every year since 2002, the Library Affiliates each choose a book to celebrate at the Book Festival in the Library's Roadmap to Reading. Lists of "Great Reads from Great Places" since 2002 are available at the Center for the Book website.

== Poster art ==
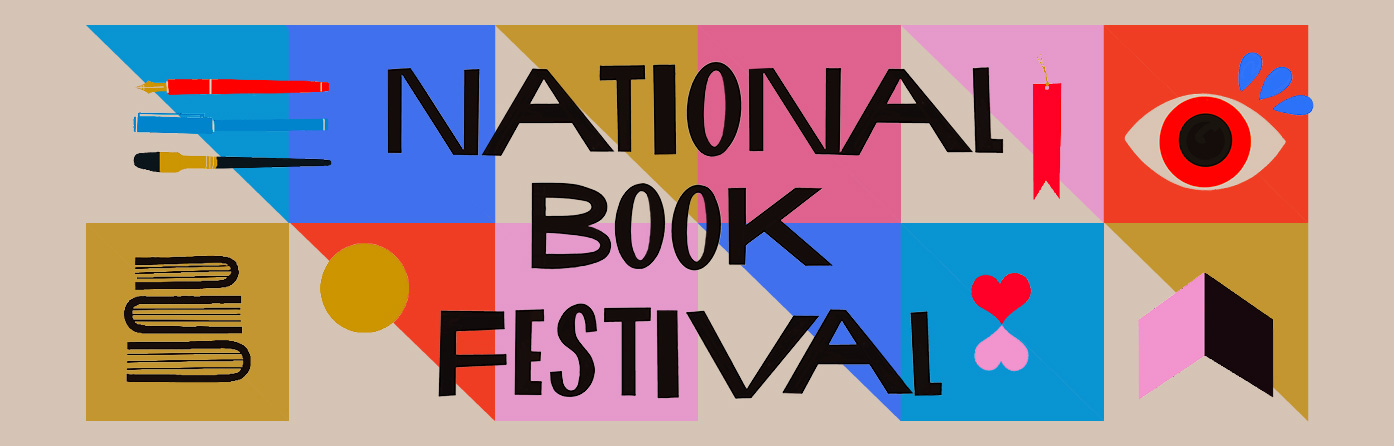
National Book Festival 2022 poster

Each year the Festival commissions an artist to design an event poster.

- Lu Ann Barrow (2001)
- Carol Dyer (2002)
- Joey Manlapaz (2003)
- Floyd Cooper (2004)
- Jerry Pinkney (2005)
- Gennady Spirin (2006)
- Mercer Mayer (2007)
- Jan Brett (2008)
- Charles Santore (2009)
- Peter Ferguson (2010)
- Jon J Muth (2011)
- Rafael López (2012)
- Suzy Lee (2013)
- Bob Staake (2014)
- Peter de Sève (2015)
- Yuko Shimizu (2016)
- Roz Chast (2017)
- Gaby D'Alessandro (2018)
- Marian Bantjes (2019)
- Rodrigo Corral (2020)
- Dana Tanamachi (2021)
- Gail Anderson (2022)
- Lisa Congdon (2023)
- Laci Jordan (2024)

== See also ==
- Books in the United States
