= Daryna Maxymets =

Ukrainian journalist and publisher (born 1956)

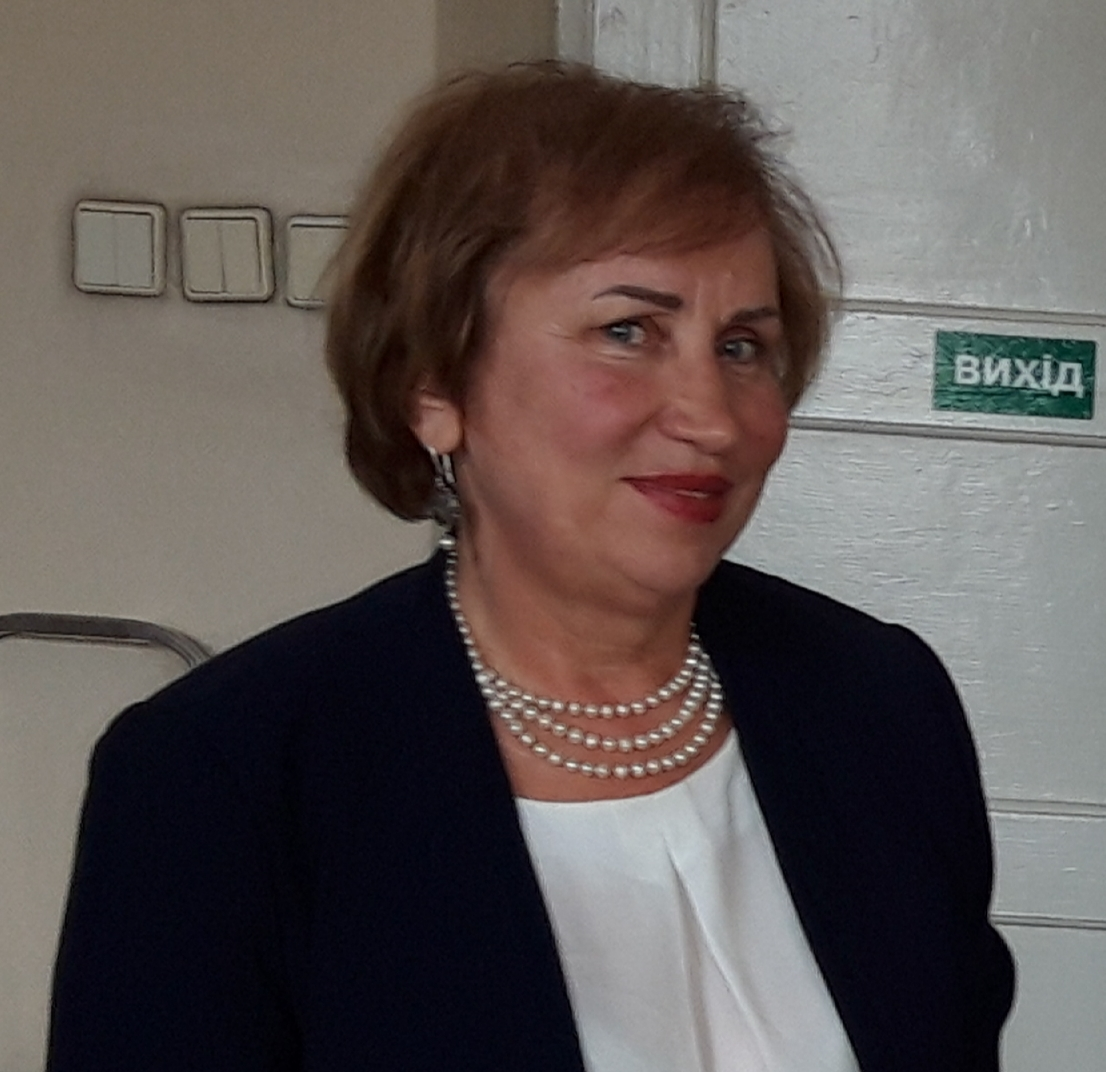
- Maxymets at the Lviv Book Forum, September 2019
- Born: Darya Tuz; 28 October 1956 (age 69); Potelych, Zhovkva Raion, Lviv Oblast, Ukrainian SSR, Soviet Union
- Occupations: Journalist, publisher, media-expert, NGO manager
- Known for: director of the publishing house "Bukrek" (Chernivtsi)

Daryna Maxymets (Ukrainian: Дарина Степанівна Максимець; born 28 October 1956) is a Ukrainian journalist, publisher, head of the Association of Business Women of Bukovina, Honored Journalist of Ukraine (2002), and director of the publishing house "Bukrek" (Chernivtsi). She lives and works in Chernivtsi.

== Biography ==
Maxymets was born on 28 October 1956 in the village of Potelych, Zhovkva Raion, Lviv Oblast.

Her husband is Mykola Maxymets, editor-in-chief of Bukrek and writer.
