= The Turnip =

German fairy tale

Folk tale
- Name: The Turnip
- Aarne–Thompson grouping: ATU 1960D ("The Giant Vegetable"); ATU 1689A ("Two Presents for the King")
- Country: Germany
- Published in: Grimm's Fairy Tales

"The Turnip" (German: die Rübe) is a German fairy tale collected by the Brothers Grimm in Grimm's Fairy Tales (KHM 146).

It is of Aarne-Thompson type 1960D ("The Giant Vegetable") and of type 1689A ("Two Presents for the King"), with an episode of type 1737 ("Trading Places with the Trickster in a Sack").

== Synopsis ==
Two brothers, one rich, one poor, serve as soldiers, but the poor one has to become a farmer to escape his poverty. One of his turnips grows to an enormous size, and he gives it to the king. The king gives him rich presents in return. The rich brother gives the king many great presents, and the king gives him the turnip in return. Angry, the rich brother hires murderers and lures his brother on a path, but when the murderers are going to hang the poor brother, they hear someone approaching who is singing. So they throw the poor brother into a sack and hang it, before running off. The poor brother makes a hole in the sack and sees the singer, a student. He tells him that he is in the Sack of Knowledge, and he is learning marvelous things in it. The student asks to change places with him. The poor brother agrees and hefts him up, telling him that he is learning something already, but after an hour, he sends someone to let the student down.

== See also ==
- The Gigantic Turnip
