= Bukrek =

Ukrainian business

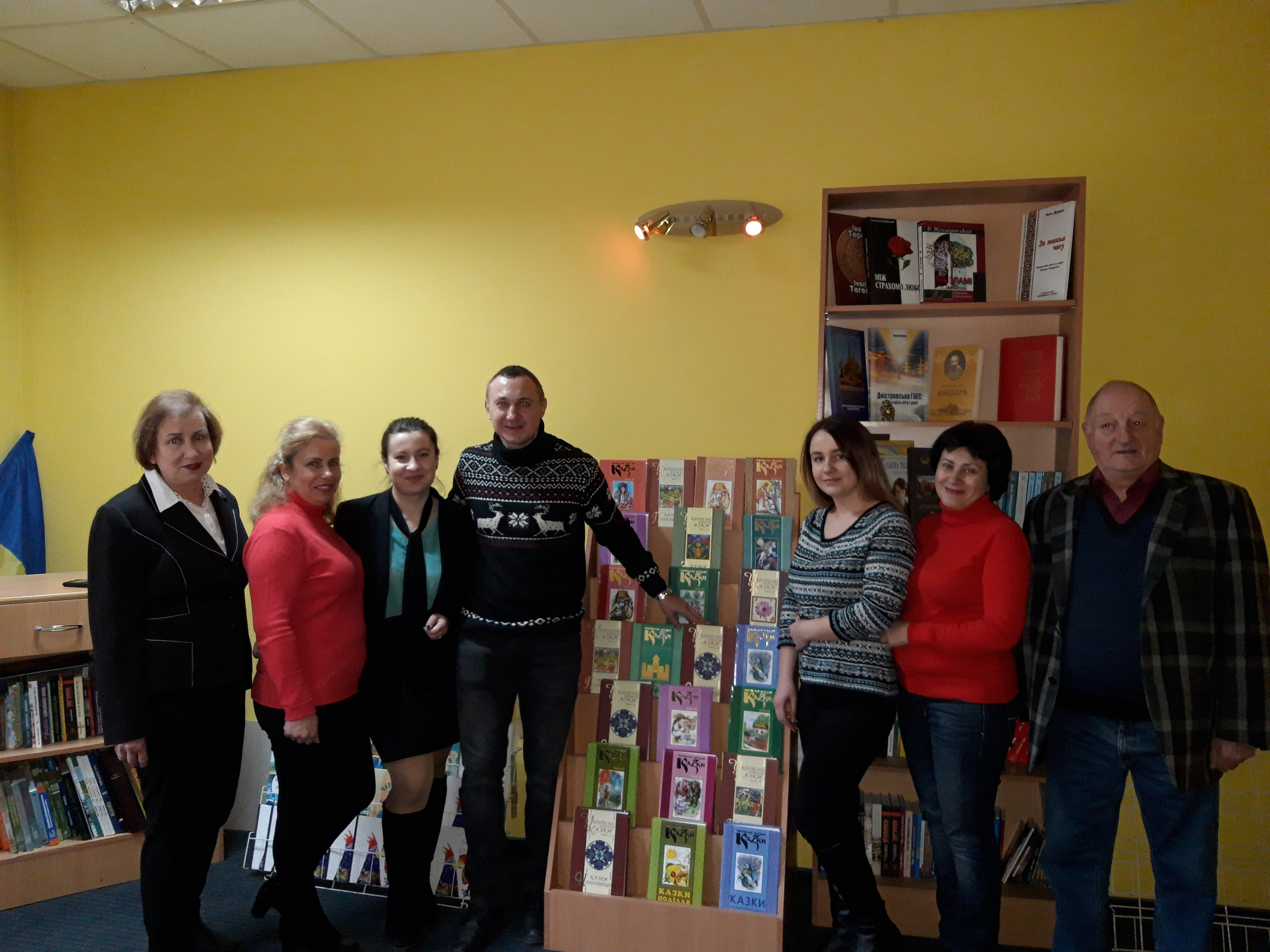
Bukrek team (the very left – director of publishing house Daryna Maxymets) in the office in Chernivtsi, February 2020

Bukrek (Ukrainian: Букрек) is a Ukrainian publishing house founded in 1992. The company based in Chernivtsi (with representation in Kyiv). The founder, owner and director is Daryna Maxymets.

The company's name comes from the words Буковинська (Bukovinian) реклама (reclama, i.e. ads), the name of business newspaper, published by the company in the 1990s.

The enterprise has many prizes and honored signs during his history.

Bukrek's pool of fiction writers includes Zirka Menzatyuk, Olexandr Balabko, Valentyn Tkach, Serhiy Dzyuba, some local (Chernivtsi Oblast) authors etc.

Leonid Talalay, Vasyl' Herasymyuk, Grigoriy Tymenko, Ihor Rymaruk, and many others are the Ukrainian modern poets whose books were published by Bukrek.

The company published some translations of fiction, nonfiction, poetry, icl. classic literature from Romanian, French, Hebrew and other languages.

Specific activity of Bukrek is editing and publishing of literature and schoolbooks for the Ukrainian ethnic minorities (Polish, Romanian, Gagauz, Crimean Tatars etc.) in cooperation with Ministry of Education and Science of Ukraine.

The prominent project of the publishing house is multi-volume selection of the Ukrainian Folk Tales (recordings and editing of Mykola Zinchuk, 1970-2010s), realized during a decade (2009-2019).

== Sources ==
- Website of the publishing house "Bukrek"
- Буковинські видавці - 20-річчю-незалежності
- Буковинське видавництво - переможець конкурсу в Москві
- Книга "З української старовини" чернівецького видавництва "Букрек" визнана найкращою книгою України
- Буковинське видавництво перемогло на конкурсі у Москві
- Цьогорічна “Найкраща книга України”
