= Vyacheslav Levandovsky =

Soviet Ukrainian animator (1897–1962)

- В'ячеслав В'ячеславович Левандовський
- Born: 24 February 1897; Kyiv, Russian Empire (now Ukraine)
- Died: 18 April 1962 (aged 65); Moscow, Soviet Union
- Education: Kyiv Academy of Arts
- Occupations: Animator, film director, artist
- Known for: Founder of Ukrainian animation The Tale of the Straw Bull (1927)

Vyacheslav Levandovsky (February 24, 1897 – April 18, 1962), considered to be the founder of Ukrainian animation, was a Ukrainian animator whose 1927 film "The Fairy Tale of the Straw Bull", filmed at his Odesa studio, was the first filmed Ukrainian animation.

== Early life ==
Levandovsky was born on February 24, 1897, in Kyiv. An active, thin child with a shy demeanor, his artistic ability impressed others.

== Career ==
Drawn to the arts and to theater, in 1920 he began work in theaters painting scenery and illustrating books. Interested in ballet, he became associated with Serge Lifer and in 1923 studied ballet at the Kyiv Music and Drama Institute. He graduated from Kyiv Academy of Arts.

In 1925 Levandovsky began to work at the Odesa Film Factory. Becoming interested in animation, he spoke to the studio's director about the possibility of animated films and ultimately became head of the new department. Shortly after, in 1927, Vyacheslav Levandovsky began his animation career in Odesa, created the silent film puppet cartoon "Chaff Goby (Shazka o solomennon bychke or Solomennyi Biychok)" also translated "The Tale of the Straw Bull", based on the Ukrainian fairy tale, Straw Bull, and work of the same name by Oleksandr Oles. However, the film has now been lost. While the original film was lost, Oleksandr Shimon from Kharkiv saw the original work and described it: "We got to see several cartoon characters, small paper figures of animals, consisting of hinged parts, they still amaze with their expressiveness and filigree of technical execution, perfectly reproduce the illusion of movement.".

Levandovsky built his own camera with wooden parts and optics. He came up with an "éclair" method that used the filmed actor performance projected onto a screen still frame by still frame as a model for drawing animated characters in motion. Another technique Levandovsky used was referred to as the "pencil of time", essentially using a pencil to punch holes in paper to then be used for more precise puppet movements frame-by-frame. Levandvosky shot film at a rate of approximately 25 frames per second.

Vyacheslav Levandovsky continued his career in Kyiv, with The Tale about the Squirrel Hostess and the Mouse Villain (Shazka o belle khoziaushke I myshke zlodeike) in 1928. He created approximately twelve other works of animation, including the 1927 "Ukrainization" about the introduction of the Ukrainian language as an official language in Ukraine, and starting work in 1928 on the later-completed "Tuk-Tuk and his friend Zhuk".

The All-Ukrainian Photo Cinema Administration (VUFKU), parent entity of Levandovsky's animation studio, closed in the early 1930s with many of its leaders imprisoned or executed to suppress a Ukrainian national revival in the 1930s. After its closure, the All-Ukrainian Photo Cinema Administration was recreated into the All-Ukrainian film industry trust, "Ukrainfilm". This move effectively ended the studio's independence, making it a branch of the Soviet Union's Soyuzkino.

During this time Levandovsky was working on one of the first Ukrainian animation films with sound, Tuk-Tuk i yego priyatel Zhuk(translated either Tuk-Tuk and his friend Zhuk or Knok-Knok and his friend Beatle) in 1932 (The United States' Walt Disney Company had released its first animation with synchronized sound, Steamboat Willie, four years earlier in 1928). Levandovsky continued working in Kyiv until 1936 and Moscow after 1933.

Continuing work Levandovsky began, in 1934 in Odesa, two of Levandovsky's young students, Semyon Guetsky (1902–1974) and Eugene Gorbach (1901-?), created the first Ukrainian graphic animated film, Murzilka in Africa, about a fairy tale character named Murzilka who goes to Africa to save a girl named Kane from oppression and cruelty. Started in 1928 by Levandovsky and finished by Guetsky and Gorbach in 1935, the 1936 Zhuk v zooparke (the Beatle in the Zoo) and the 1938 release of Tuk-Tuk and his friend Zhuk was the first Ukrainian attempt to create a serial animation character.

As a result of an environment curtailing animation in Ukraine, from 1933, Levandovsky worked at Moscow's "Mosfilm" film studio as an animator and director of puppet films. He directed the cartoon "The Fox and the Grapes" (1937), "Silver Rain" (1938), and designed the puppets "The Golden Key" (1939). With the director H. Yelizarov, he created the cartoon "In the Land of Dolls" (1941).

Vyacheslav Vyacheslavovich Levandovsky died on April 18, 1962.

In 1980 Ivan Ivanov-Vano stated Viacheslav Levandovsky could only be compared to Yuri Norstein, who the Washington Post's Peter Finn described as, "considered by many to be not just the best animator of his era, but the best of all time".

== See also ==
- History of Ukrainian animation
