= Ukrainian fairy tale =

Fairy tales from Ukraine

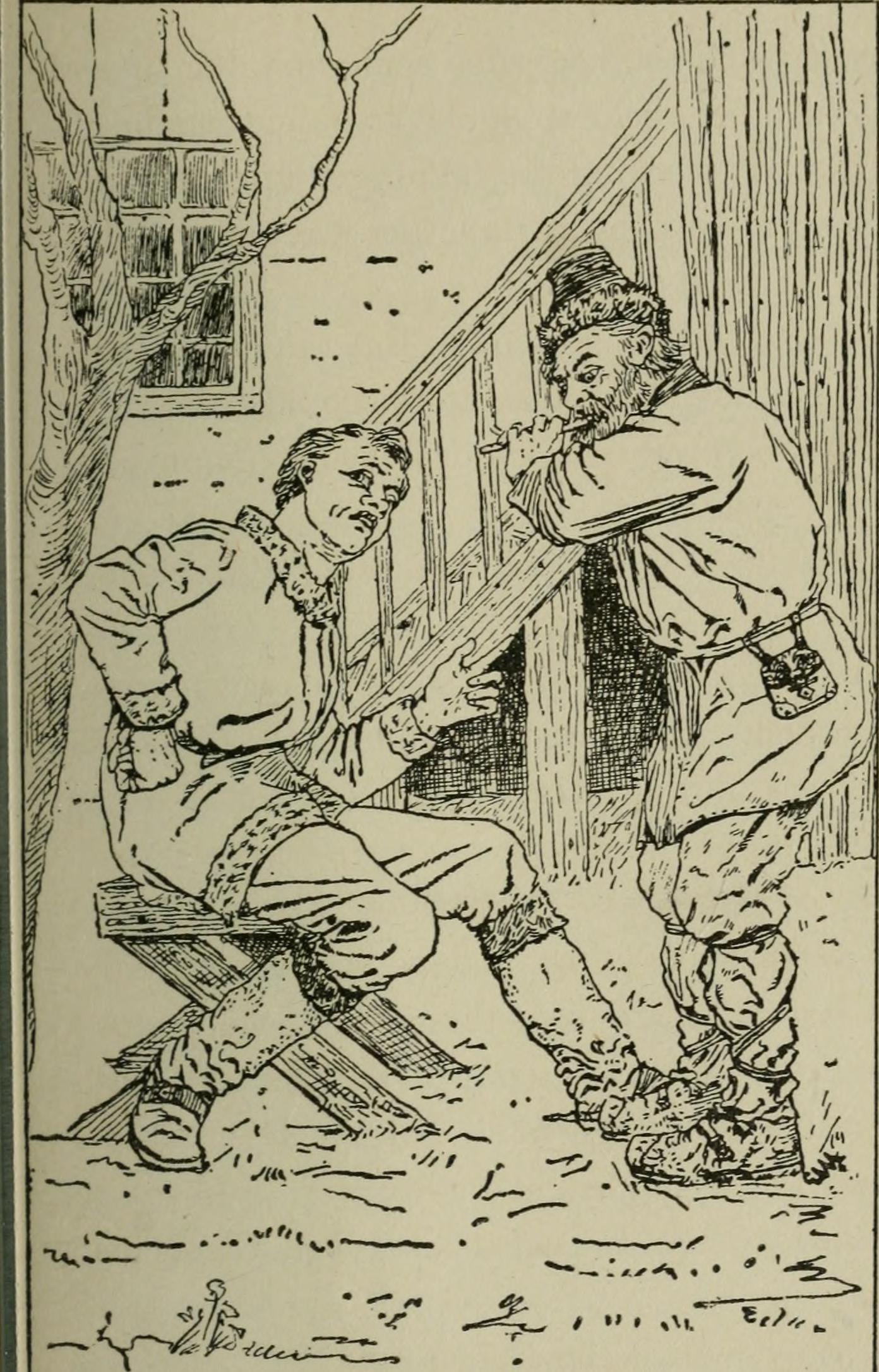
Early Ukrainian fairy tale illustration from 1894

In times of oral tradition, a fairy tale (Ukrainian: казка, romanized: kazka, pronounced [ˈkɑzkɐ]; pl. казки, kazky) was used in Ukraine to transmit knowledge and history.

== Description ==
Ukrainian folk literature is vast. Many Ukrainian fairy tales feature forests and grassy plains, with people working as farmers or hunters. Many Ukrainian fairy tales feature animals. There are often parallels with other regional traditions such as Russia, Turkey, and Poland. One purpose of Ukrainian fairy tales was to teach children about dangers, and also the importance of growing crops for survival the following year. Though teaching children was an important purpose of Ukrainian fairy tales, Ukrainian fairy tales were not exclusively for children.

Characters in Ukrainian fairy tales often feature warriors, princes, and peasants. Some of the Common features of narrative transition in Ukrainian kazky that include mediators (objects, actions, notions, events, or conditions), magic helpers (objects, things, or supernatural beings, as in Mare's Head), and triggers (signs or prohibitions). These elements perform a linking function in the narrative and provide motivation for the main character to move from one setting to another.

== Collection of fairy tales while under occupation ==
Professor of Folklore at the University of Alberta, Natalie Kononenko writes that while historically often under occupation of foreign powers, folklore was one of the few means of cultural expression allowed to Ukrainian authors and scholars.

=== Russian Empire and Austria-Hungary ===
When eastern Ukraine was under the rule of the Russian Empire, activities thought to promote feelings of Ukrainian nationalism or pride were banned, but folklore, seen as the province of a rural, ignorant people, was thought to be harmless. Because folklore was considered to advance a perception that Ukraine (called “Little Russia” by the Russian Empire) was a backward, border place, research and study of Ukrainian folklore was even considered beneficial for the subjugation of Ukrainians. It is in part due to this permissive view on Ukrainian folklore that scholarly work on Ukrainian folklore from the 1800s is available today.

Under the hierarchy of the Russian Empire, Russia considered itself “Great Russia”, Belarus “White Russia”, and Ukraine to be “Little Russia”. As a result of this enforced hierarchy under the Russian Empire, much Ukrainian folklore was not initially published as Ukrainian folklore, but instead labeled as Russian folklore. Thus, some folklore labeled as Russian folklore was subsumed Ukrainian folklore along with folklore from Belarus. When Ukrainian folklore has been labeled as Russian, Ukrainian folk tales can be discerned from Russian folklore from the language used, and often with indications of a place where the folk tale was collected. While a similar situation existed in western Ukraine under control of Austro-Hungary, there was less attempt to assimilate Ukrainian people and culture into a larger dominant political group.

=== Soviet Union ===
Under Soviet Union rule encompassing both east and west Ukraine, folklore was treated more suspiciously by authorities. The Soviet government realized the effectiveness of folklore and sought to replace traditional folklore with new Soviet folklore that promoted principles the Soviet government considered desirable such as submissiveness and collectivism. Thus, Soviet rule censored older Ukrainian folklore and tales of aspects deemed threatening such as references to religion, or ideas which might encourage thoughts of Ukrainian pride or nationalism, including references particularly Ukrainian such as pysanky.

== Ukrainian fairy tales in modern culture ==
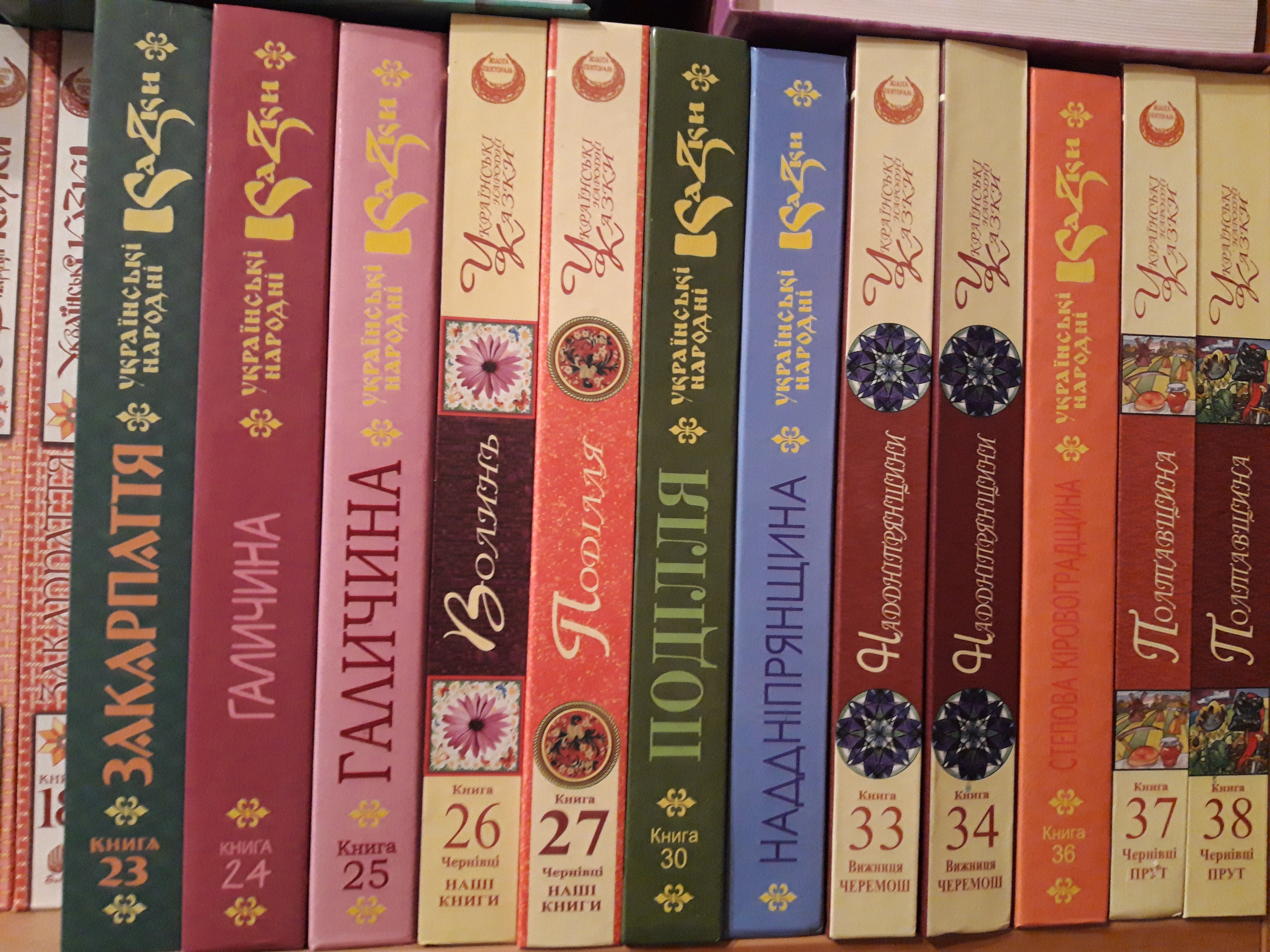
Books from Mykola Zinchuk's collection of Ukrainian folk tales

=== Collections and modern retellings ===
==== Ukrainian language ====
- In 1900, Maria Hrinchenko wrote a collection of Ukrainian fables and folk tales entitled, "Из уст народа" (From the Mouths of the People).
- In the early 1900's, Ukrainian writer, Lesya Ukrainka, wrote a three act play titled as The Forest Song based on the folk mythology surrounding Mavka. In 2023, an animated version entitled "Mavka: The Forest Song" was released.
- Professor of folklore, Lidiia Dunayevska, compiled a series of Ukrainian folk tales between 1983 and 2004.
- Ukrainian folklorist, Mykola Zinchuk, collected, edited and published 40 volumes of Ukrainian fairy tales, published by the publishing house, Bukrek between 2003-2019.
- Children's book author, Zirka Menzatyuk, uses historical Ukrainian fairy tales as an inspiration for newer writing.
- Edited by Ivan Malkovych, between 2005 and 2012, Ukrainian publisher, A-ba-ba-ha-la-ma-ha, published three volumes of Ukrainian fairy tales in a series called "100 Kazok" (100 fairy tales). Each volume contained 100 fairy tales. 130,000 copies were printed of the first two volumes, and the 2005 volume was a book of the year.

==== English language ====
- Irina Zheleznova translated a collection of Ukrainian fairy tales into English, entitled Ukrainian Folk Tales, first published by Dnipro Publishers in 1981.
- A 1996 retelling of the Ukrainian fairy tale, The Mitten, by children's author Jan Brett, has become a best-selling classic.
- In 1996, Christina Oparenko retold collected Ukrainian fairy tales in Ukrainian Folk-tales for the series Oxford Myths and Legends.
- In 1997, Barbara Suwyn retold collected Ukrainian fairy tales in The Magic Egg and Other Tales from Ukraine with editing and an introduction by Natalie Kononenko.
- Between 1994 and 2003, Canadian author, Danny Evanishen, wrote and published eleven books containing Ukrainian folk tales retold in English.
- In 2024, Harvard University Press will release a translation of Lesya Ukrainka's The Forest Song, with English language translation by Virlana Tkacz and Wanda Phipps.

=== Other usage in culture ===
Some Ukrainian fairy tales have been featured on stamps of Ukrposhta, the national postal service of Ukraine. Many have been retold in Ukrainian animation. The Ukrainian pop band, Kazka, takes its name from the Ukrainian word for fairy tale. Some fairy tale characters have been created in sculpture, such as the statue of Ivasyk-Telesyk in Lviv, Ukraine's Stryiskyi Park.

== See also ==
- Fairy tale
- Ukrainian Folklore
- History of Ukrainian Animation
- Category:Ukrainian fairy tales
- Russian fairy tale
