= Hryhoriy Tymenko =

Ukrainian poet

- Григорій Тименко
- Born: 8 February 1945; Ukrainian Soviet Socialist Republic (USSR) (present-day Ukraine)
- Disappeared: November 1968 (aged 23)
- Citizenship: Ukrainian SSR
- Occupation: poet
- Known for: the Samizdat representative

Hryhoriy Tymenko (Ukrainian: Григорій Тименко; 8 February 1945 — disappeared November 1968) was a Ukrainian poet in 1960s (Sixtiers movement), the Samizdat representative.

== Biography ==
Hryhoriy Tymenko was born in 1945 in Protsiv village, Boryspil Raion, Kyiv Oblast.

After graduation from secondary and evening schools, he studied in Kyiv University, but was obliged to leave it.

In early 1960s, he started his author career. The first publication of his verses was in 1964. He worked in several state printing enterprises.

His poems were published in Samizdat during his lifetime.

== Disappearance and aftermath ==
Hryhoriy Tymenko disappeared without a trace in November 1968.

Ivan Dziuba was the person who rediscovered Hryhoriy Tymenko as a poet in 1990–2010s (posthumously), publishing his works in some printing media as well as in the book.

== See also ==
- List of people who disappeared

== Sources ==
- Тименко Г. На вулиці мертвого сонця / Григорій Тименко. –Чернівці, «Букрек», 2015. — 178с. — Третє тисячоліття: українська поезія. (in Ukrainian)
- Коверзнєв К. «Голос невидного» // Робітнича газета. — 1997. — No. 9. — С. 4. (in Ukrainian)
- Grigoriy Tymenko on virtual museum 'Dissident movement in Ukraine'
