= 53rd Berlin International Film Festival =

2003 film festival in Berlin, Germany

- Festival poster
- Opening film: Chicago
- Closing film: Gangs of New York
- Location: Berlin, Germany
- Founded: 1951
- Awards: Golden Bear: In This World
- Hosted by: Anke Engelke
- No. of films: 286 films
- Festival date: 6–16 February 2003
- Website: Website

Berlin International Film Festival chronology
- 54th 52nd

The 53rd annual Berlin International Film Festival was held from February 6–16, 2003. The festival opened with musical film Chicago by Rob Marshall and closed with Martin Scorsese's Gangs of New York, both films played out of competition at the festival.

The Golden Bear was awarded to In This World directed by Michael Winterbottom.

The retrospective dedicated to German film director F. W. Murnau was shown at the festival.

== Juries ==
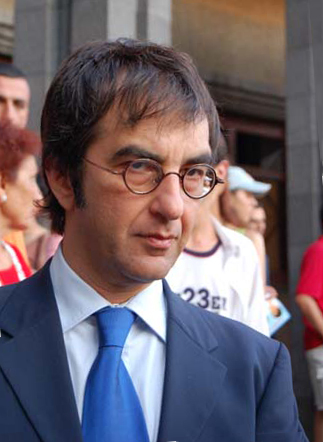
Atom Egoyan, Jury President

The following people were announced as being on the jury for the festival:

=== Main Competition ===
- Atom Egoyan, Canadian filmmaker and producer - Jury President
- Martina Gedeck, German actress
- Anna Galiena, Italian actress
- Kathryn Bigelow, American filmmaker and producer
- Abderrahmane Sissako, Mauritanian filmmaker
- Humbert Balsan, French actor and producer
- Geoffrey Gilmore, American director of the Tribeca Film Festival

=== Short Films Competition ===
- Andreas Dresen, German filmmaker
- Phyllis Mollet, French director of communication of the FIAPF
- Thom Palmen, Swedish director of the Umeå International Film Festival

== Official selection ==
=== Main Competition ===
The following films were in competition for the Golden Bear and Silver Bear awards:

English title	Original title	Director(s)	Country
25th Hour		Spike Lee	United States
Adaptation		Spike Jonze	United States
Alexandra's Project		Rolf de Heer	Australia
Angst	Der alte Affe Angst	Oskar Roehler	Germany
Blind Shaft	盲井	Yang Li	China, Germany, Hong Kong
Confessions of a Dangerous Mind		George Clooney	United States, Canada, Germany
Distant Lights	Lichter	Hans-Christian Schmid	Germany
The Flower of Evil	La fleur du mal	Claude Chabrol	France
Good Bye, Lenin!		Wolfgang Becker	Germany
Hero	英雄	Yimou Zhang	China, Hong Kong
His Brother	Son frère	Patrice Chéreau	France
The Hours		Stephen Daldry	United States, United Kingdom
I'm Not Scared	Io non ho paura	Gabriele Salvatores	Italy, Spain, United Kingdom
In This World		Michael Winterbottom	United Kingdom
The Life of David Gale		Alan Parker	United States, Germany
Madame Brouette		Moussa Sene Absa	Canada, Senegal, France
My Life Without Me		Isabel Coixet	Spain, Canada
Small Cuts		Pascal Bonitzer	France, United Kingdom
Solaris		Steven Soderbergh	United States
Spare Parts	Rezervni deli	Damjan Kozole	Slovenia
The Twilight Samurai	たそがれ清兵衛	Yōji Yamada	Japan
Yes Nurse! No Nurse!	Ja zuster, nee zuster	Pieter Kramer	Netherlands

=== Short Films Competition ===
English title	Original title	Director(s)	Country
(A)Torzija		Stefan Arsenijevic	Serbia
Araki: The Killing of a Japanese Photographer		Anders Morgenthaler	Denmark
The Chubbchubbs!		Eric Armstrong	United States
Delores		Adam Stevens	Germany
In Absentia	En ausencia	Lucía Cedrón	Germany
The Good Son		Michael Sandoval	United Kingdom
War Against Stones		Andreas Teuchert	Germany
The Tram Was Going, Number Nine	Йшов трамвай дев'ятий номер	Stepan Koval	Ukraine
Fish		Jonathan Davies	Finland
Savior		Athanasios Karanikolas	Germany
The Match		Ursula Ferrara	Italy
Long Take		Patrícia Moran	Brazil
Rettet Berlin!		Gerd Conradt	Germany
Spin		Cath Le Couteur	United Kingdom
Tarry		Stijn van Santen	Netherlands
The Toll Collector		Rachel Johnson	Czechoslovakia, United States
Never Trust a Cow		Nathalie Percillier	France

=== Retrospective ===
2003 Retrospective poster, dedicated to F. W. Murnau

The following films were shown in the retrospective:

English title	Original title	Director(s)	Country
7th Heaven		Frank Borzage	United States
The Burning Soil	Der brennende Acker	F. W. Murnau	Germany
City Girl		F. W. Murnau	United States
Early Spring	早春	Yasujirō Ozu	Japan
Equinox Flower	彼岸花	Yasujirō Ozu	Japan
Faust	Faust – Eine deutsche Volkssage	F. W. Murnau	Germany
Four Sons		John Ford	United States
Good Morning	お早よう	Yasujirō Ozu	Japan
The Grand Duke's Finances	Die Finanzen des Großherzogs	F. W. Murnau	Germany
Journey into the Night	Der Gang in die Nacht	F. W. Murnau	Germany
The Last Laugh	Der letzte Mann	F. W. Murnau	Germany
Legong	Legong: Dance Of The Virgins	Henry de La Falaise	United States
The Merry Widow		Ernst Lubitsch	United States
Moana		Robert J. Flaherty	United States
Nosferatu – A Symphony Of Horror	Nosferatu, eine Symphonie des Grauens	F. W. Murnau	Germany
Nosferatu the Vampyre	Nosferatu – Phantom der Nacht	Werner Herzog	West Germany, France
The Philadelphia Story		George Cukor	United States
Phantom		F. W. Murnau	Germany
Tabu: A Story of the South Seas		F. W. Murnau	United States
Tartüff	Tartuffe	F. W. Murnau	Germany
White Shadows in the South Seas		W. S. Van Dyke, Robert J. Flaherty	United States

=== Perspektive Deutsches Kino ===
The following feature and documentary films were selected for the Perspektive Deutsches Kino - section:

English title	Original title	Director(s)	Country
They've Got Knut	Sie haben Knut	Stefan Krohmer	Germany
We	Wir	Martin Gypkens	Germany
Bernau liegt am Meer		Martina Döcker	Germany
Grüsse aus Dachau	From Dachau with Love	Bernd Fischer	Germany
Science Fiction	Kein Science Fiction or Science Fiction	Franz Müller	Germany
Narren	Fools	Tom Schreiber	Germany
Kiki & Tiger	Kiki and Tiger	Alain Gsponer	Germany
Unternehmen Paradies		Volker Sattel	Germany
Let It Rock!		Igor Paasch	Germany
Befreite Zone	Liberated Zone	Norbert Baumgarten	Germany
Schattenwelt	Hình bóng	Robin von Hardenberg	Germany
The Family Jewels	Eierdiebe	Robert Schwentke	Germany
My First Miracle	Mein erstes Wunder	Anne Wild	Germany

=== German Cinema ===
English title	Original title	Director(s)	Country
Anatomy 2	Anatomie 2	Stefan Ruzowitzky	Germany

== Official Awards ==
=== Main Competition ===
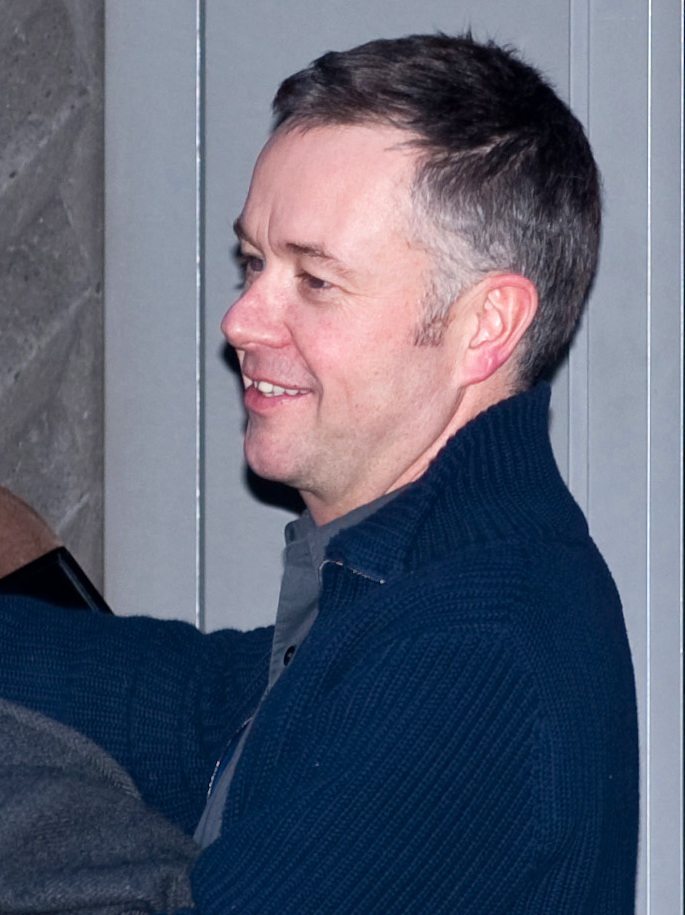
Michael Winterbottom, winner of the Golden Bear at the festival

The following prizes were awarded by the Jury:

- Golden Bear: In This World by Michael Winterbottom
- Silver Bear Jury Grand Prix: Adaptation by Spike Jonze
- Silver Bear for Best Director: Patrice Chéreau for His Brother
- Silver Bear for Best Actor: Sam Rockwell for Confessions of a Dangerous Mind
- Silver Bear for Best Actress: Meryl Streep, Nicole Kidman and Julianne Moore for The Hours
- Silver Bear for Best Film Music: Majoly, Serge Fiori and Maadu Diabaté for Madame Brouette
- Silver Bear for Outstanding Artistic Contribution: Yang Li for Blind Shaft

=== Short Film Competition ===
- Short Film Golden Bear:
  - In Absentia by Lucía Cedrón
  - The Tram #9 Was Going by Stepan Koval

=== Honorary Golden Bear ===
- Anouk Aimée

=== Berlinale Camera ===
- Artur Brauner
- Peer Raben
- Erika Richter

=== Panorama Audience Award ===
- Broken Wings by Nir Bergman

=== Crystal Bear ===
- Best Short Film: Pipsqueak Prince by Zoia Trofimova
- Best Feature Film: Elina: As If I Wasn't There by Klaus Härö

== Independent Awards ==
=== FIPRESCI Award ===
- Distant Lights by Hans-Christian Schmid
  - Special Mention: Remake by Dino Mustafić
