= Straw Bull =

Ukrainian folk tale

The Straw Bull
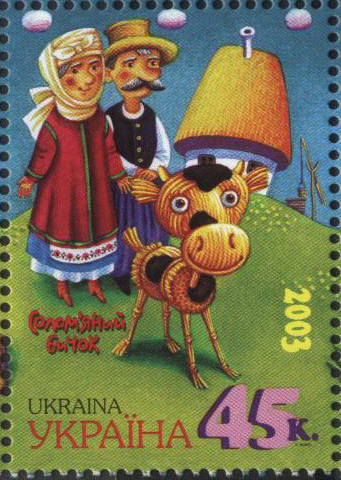
- Stamp of Ukraine depicting the Straw Bull

Folk tale
- Name: The Straw Bull
- Also known as: 'The Straw Ox' or 'Chaff Goby'
- Region: Ukraine

Straw Bull or Straw Ox, sometimes Chaff Goby (Ukrainian: «Солом'яний бичок», romanized: Solom'yanyi Bychok), is a Ukrainian folk tale about a poor old man and woman whose lives are improved by the creation of a straw bull coated with tar.

== Plot ==
An old man and woman were poor. While they worked hard spinning flax and working in the field, they had just enough to eat, and no more. One day, the old woman asked the old man to make her a bull made of straw, and to paint it with tar. While the old man did not know why the woman asked, he obliged and made it as she requested.

The next day, the old woman took her spinning equipment and the straw bull out to the field, where she told the ox to graze, after which time she fell asleep.

While the old woman slept, a bear approached the straw bull and attacked it to use the straw bull's tar to heal an open wound. The straw bull became stuck to the bear, and the bear ran off. The woman awoke in time to see the straw bull being carried off by the bear, and called her husband to catch it. The husband caught the bear, locked the bear in their barn, fixed the straw bull, and put the straw bull in a stall.

The second day, the routine was repeated, except that the straw bull was attacked by a wolf. On the third day, the straw bull was attacked by a fox, and on the fourth day by a rabbit. Each sought to use the straw bull's tar to heal a wound, ended up stuck to the straw bull, and then captured by the old man.

The old man looked at the four animals he had caught, and decided to make a fur coat out of the bear, a fur cap out of the wolf, a fur collar out of the fox, and gloves out of the rabbit. Each animal in turn promised a reward for the old man and woman if they were released. The bear promised wild honey, the wolf a flock of wild sheep, the fox a flock of wild geese, and the rabbit precious jewels. The old man released each in turn, after which the old woman thought the old man had been too kind before the approach of a cold winter.

To the surprise of the old woman and the old man, each animal fulfilled their promise. Their lives much improved, the old man and the old woman in turn built the straw bull its own stall, and treated it well the rest of their lives.

== In media ==
- A book entitled "Solomianyi bychok (The Straw Bull)", written in Ukrainian by Ukrainian author, Oleksandr Oles, published in 1925.
- The story "The Straw Ox" appears in the collection "Great Children's Stories — The Classic Volland Edition", first published in 1923, Illustrated by Frederick Richardson
- "Straw Bull" (Ukrainian: Solomennyi Biychok), based on the Ukrainian folk tale of the same name, was the first recorded Ukrainian animation created in 1927 by Vyacheslav Levandovsky.
- A 1954 animation by Moscow's Soyuzmultfilm.
- A 1974 book by Irina Zheleznova with drawings by David Haikin.
- A 1976 book by John Weir and V. Legkobit.
- A stamp depicting the Ukrainian folk tale, Straw Bull, was created by Ukraine's national post office, Ukrposhta, in 2003.
- Featured in a 2004 book of fairy tales by Evgeny Rachev.
- Episode 12 of the 2017 Russian animation spin-off, Masha's Tales, based on Masha and the Bear.

== Gallery ==
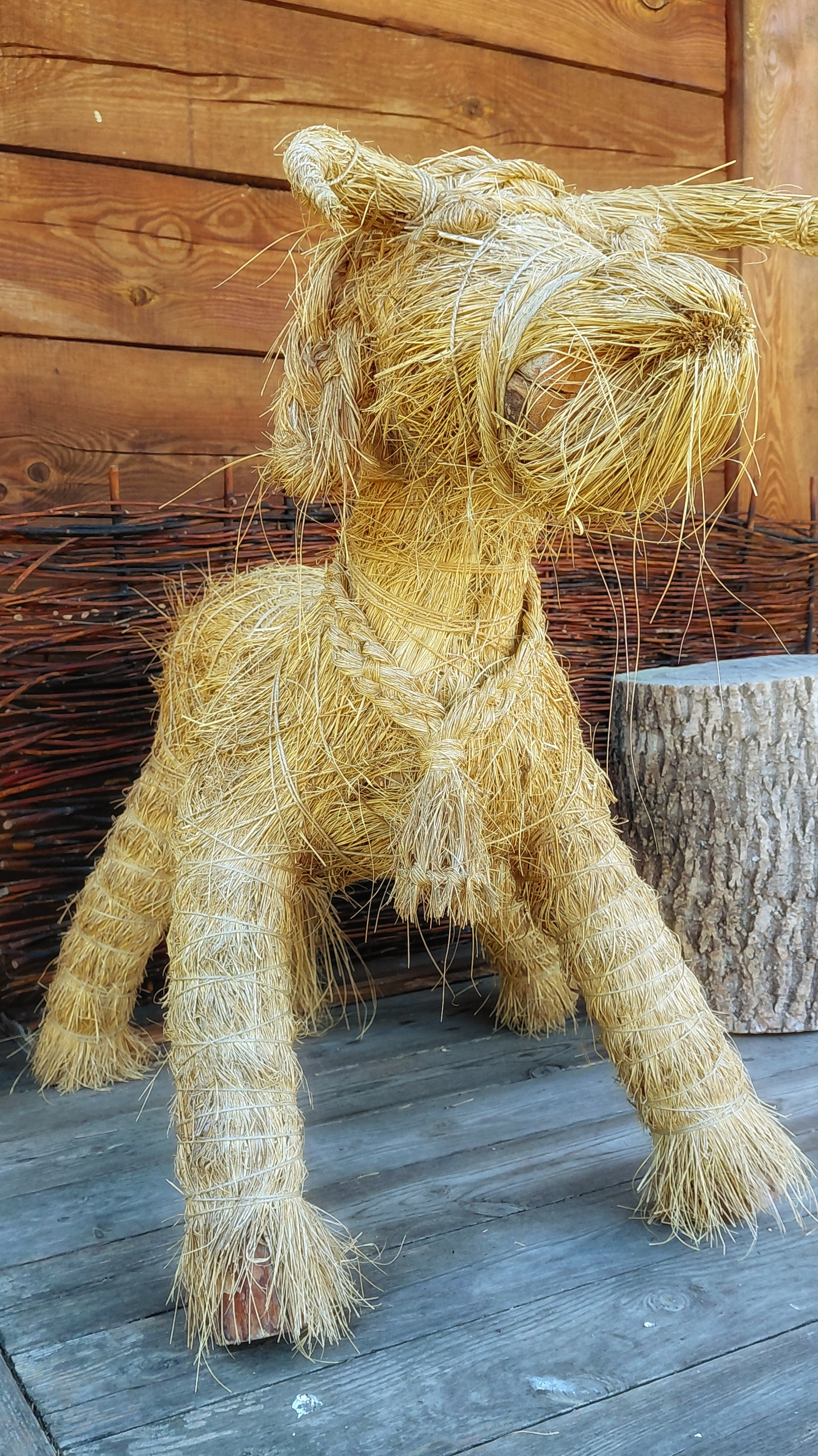
The Straw Ox
