= The Tram Was Going, Number Nine =

2002 Ukrainian animated film

- Ukrainian: «Йшов трамвай дев'ятий номер»
- Directed by: Stepan Koval
- Written by: Stepan Koval
- Music by: Ihor Zhuk
- Production company: Ukranimafilm
- Release date: November 1, 2002 (Ukraine)
- Running time: 9:23 min.
- Country: Ukraine
- Language: Ukrainian
- Budget: US$15,000

The Tram Was Going, Number Nine (Ukrainian: Ishov tramvai, deviatyi nomer) is a Ukrainian animated film about a tram that traces how people discuss their everyday lives. It was created by Ukranimafilm studio in 2002.

== Production and reception ==
Filming on The Tram Was Going, Number Nine started in 1999, but was suspended until November 2001. Due to these changes in timing, the director had to condense the filming from the original 8–9 months to 5 months. The director initially proposed the use of paper animation, but decided to use Plasticine due to the lack of availability of paper.

Production of The Tram Was Going, Number Nine was difficult due to lack of funds. Recording costed about ₴80,000 (US$15,000), funded largely from a presidential grant issued to Stepan Koval in 1998.

The authors did not have time to create subtitles, so the tape was provided without them at the Berlin Film Festival. However, it was very well received by the public. The film won a 'Special Mention' award from the 2003 FANTOCHE awards.

== Plot ==
The film tells about a familiar situation: a morning tram filled with passengers, which people are trying to catch to get to work. Children, seniors, a young family and neighbours are discussing the show. This is what the average Ukrainian experiences on his way to work, as the transport situation shows. The situation is shown in an interesting, bright and witty way.

The film uses a Plasticine animation technique to portray these events intelligently.

== Cast ==
- Stepan Koval — writer, director, art director
- Eugene Syvokin — artistic director
- Igor Zhuk — composer
- R. Boyko — arrangements
- Olexander Nikolaenko — cameraman
- Vyacheslav Yaschenko — sound engineer
- L. Mishchenko — artist-animator
- A. Tsurikov — artist-animator
- A. Pedan — artist-animator
- S. Koval — artist-animator
- Alexander Fomenko — decorator
- B. Hahun — decorator
- A. Radchenko — decorator
- Svitlana Kutsenko — editor
- Lydia Mokrousov — installation
- B. Kilinski — Director

== Sound ==
- E. Shah
- Ruslana Pysanka
- I. Kapinos-Pavlyshyno
- Yuri Kovalenko
