= Natalie Kononenko =

Canadian professor of folklore

Natalie Kononenko was Professor and Kule Chair in Ukrainian Ethnography at the University of Alberta until 2019, after which she is a Professor Emerita. Kononenko is a major contributor to the study of Ukrainian blind minstrels as well as in the area of witchcraft in Slavic cultures. She attended Radcliffe College and Harvard University.

Her 1997 book Ukrainian Minstrels: And the Blind Shall Sing is a study of traditional Ukrainian blind, begging singers known as kobzar and lirnyky, who sang epic poetry called duma. The book links these blind minstrels to religious practice, and for the first time showed how women minstrels were also important to this oral, epic tradition. The tradition of the blind minstrel is also connected to traditions in other cultures: for example the ancient Greek poet Homer is often described as blind. The first part of the book documents minstrels from 1850 to 1930, while the second part of the book contains translations of songs, intitation rites and descriptions of religious festivals. The book was praised as a significant contribution to the study of oral literature, but was also criticised for focusing on the lyrics and not the musical aspects of the tradition.

In 2019, she published the book Ukrainian Epic and Historical Song: Folklore in Context, which was reviewed in several scholarly journals.

Her 2025 book Ukrainian Ritual on the Prairies: Growing a Ukrainian Canadian Identity is about Ukrainian immigrants to Canada from the 1890s through the early 20th century. The book drew upon her work from 2009-2019 with a group that documented Ukrainian churches, where they gathered photographs and hundreds of hours of interviews.

== Publications ==
=== Books ===
- Kononenko, N. (1990) The Turkish Minstrel Tale Tradition. Garland Publishing Inc. ISBN 978-0-8240-2673-8
- Kononenko, N. (1997) Ukrainian Minstrels: And the Blind Shall Sing. M.E. Sharpe. ISBN 978-0-7656-0144-5
- Suwyn, B. (1997) The Magic Egg and Other Tales from Ukraine. Edited and with an introduction by N. Kononenko. Libraries Unlimited, Inc. ISBN 1-56308-425-2
- Kononenko, N. (2007) Slavic Folklore: A Handbook. Greenwood Press. ISBN 978-0-313-33610-2
- Holloway, P., & Kukharenko, S. (2012). The Paths of Folklore: Essays in Honor of Natalie Kononeko. ISBN 978-0893573935
- Kononenko, N. (2019). Ukrainian Epic and Historical Song: Folklore in Context. University of Toronto Press.ISBN 978-1487502638
- Kononenko, N. (2023). Ukrainian Ritual on the Prairies: Growing a Ukrainian Canadian Identity. ISBN 978-0228016816

=== Journals and Periodicals ===
- Natalie Kononenko; The Politics of innocence: Soviet and Post-Soviet Animation on Folklore topics. Journal of American Folklore 1 October 2011; 124 (494): 272–294. doi: https://doi.org/10.5406/jamerfolk.124.494.0272

== See also ==
- Blind musicians
- Bandurist
- Duma (epic)
- Ukrainian fairy tale
- History of Ukrainian Animation
