= Stepan Koval =

Ukrainian film director and animator (born 1965)

- Степа́н Ко́валь
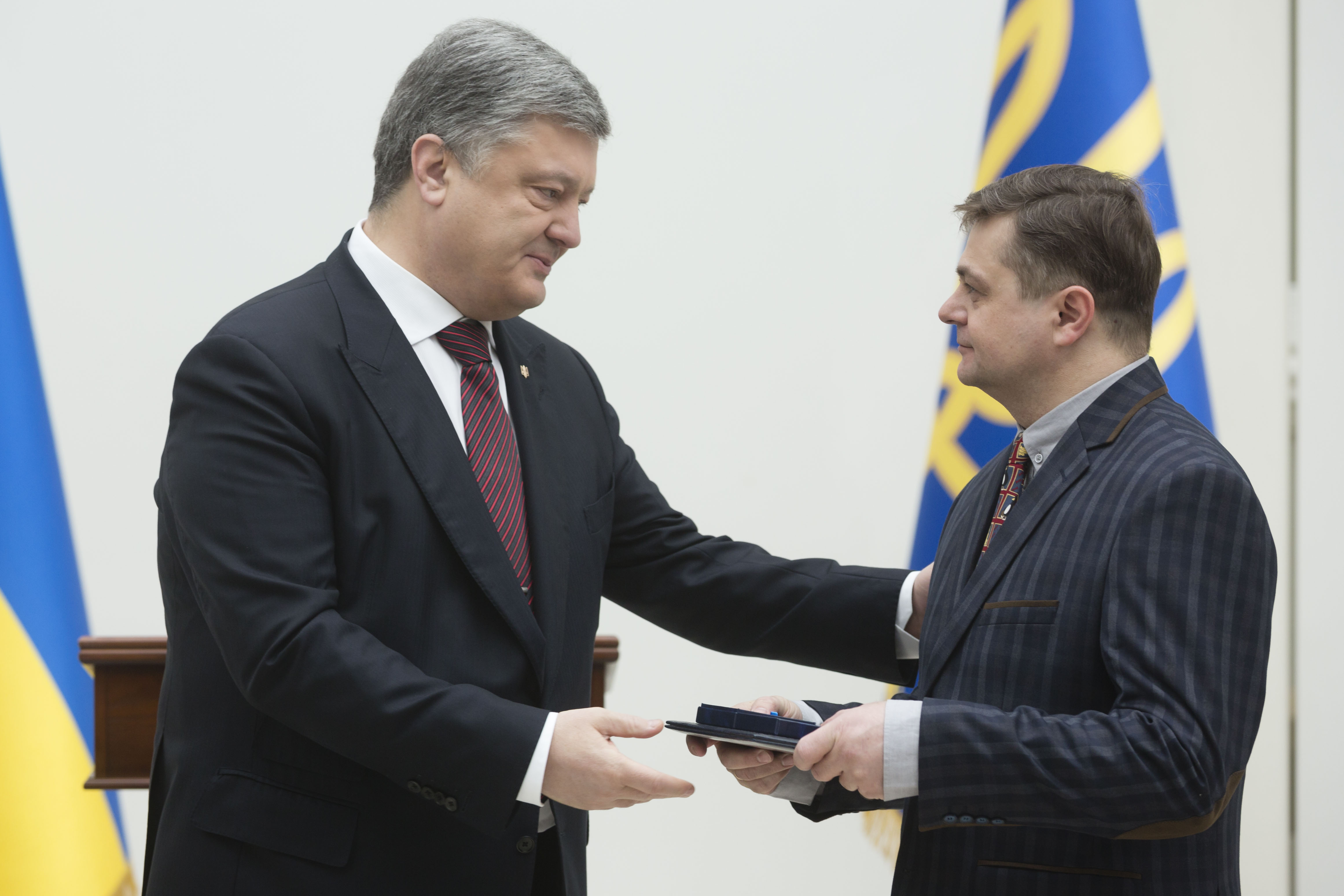
- Koval (right) being presented his Shevchenko National Prize in 2017
- Born: Stepan Mykolaiovych Koval; 18 July 1965 (age 61); Samar, Ukrainian SSR, Soviet Union
- Education: Kyiv National I. K. Karpenko-Kary Theatre, Cinema and Television University; National Academy of Visual Arts and Architecture
- Occupations: Film director and animator
- Years active: 1995–present
- Organization(s): Director of Novatorfilm and Novator studios
- Notable work: The Tram Was Going, Number Nine
- Awards: see here

Stepan Mykolaiovych Koval (Note: Ukrainian: Степа́н Микола́йович Ко́валь) (born 18 July 1965) is a Ukrainian film director and animator. Recipient of both the Berlin Film Festival Silver Bear and the Taras Shevchenko National Prize in 2017.

== Early life and education ==
Born on 18 July 1965, in the Ukrainian city of Samar. In 1993, Koval graduated from the National Academy of Visual Arts and Architecture. Following this, in 1998, he completed her studies at the Kyiv National I. K. Karpenko-Kary Theatre, Cinema and Television University, specializing as an animated film director.

== Career ==
From 1984 to 1987, Koval worked as a technician-architect in the villages of Krynychky in the Dnipropetrovsk Oblast and Samar. Following this, between 1997 and 2001, he served as a computer artist for TV graphics at the agency VIKNA, and from 2001 to 2005, she worked with the TV company TET. Since 2006, he has held the position of main director at the Novatorfilm studio in Kyiv, where she has been instrumental in leading various creative endeavors and productions.

One of the three most renowned film festivals in the world, the Silver Bear Berlinale, has recognized the short film The Tram Was Going, Number Nine as the first (and thus far, the last) in the history of Ukrainian cinema in 2002. With the help of a group of youthful aficionados and industry professionals, he has been organizing an multi-episode project called My Country Is Ukraine, since 2009. He has held the position of artistic director for the animation project.

Koval claims that making a cartoon takes a lot of work. "In the Soviet era, the system was only constructed, and the artist's job was to simply sit at work for a set length of time and make something."

== Political positions ==
Koval, the creator of Novator studio, expressed to the Kyiv Post that he believed the initial approach required some elements of communist ideology and propaganda. This approach aimed to establish trust in the system before eventually fostering the development of original content. However, he noted the impracticality of addressing broader systemic issues within this framework. According to him, the state began to allocate more funds for feature and animated films since he was awarded the Silver Bear.

== Filmography ==
Koval has made several films:

- Це — я (1995)
- Z-z-z (1998)
- The Tram Was Going, Number Nine (2002)
- Zludni (2005)
- Бійка за печиво (2006)
- Глінька (2008)
- Стоп насильство (2009)
- Стати твердим (2010)
- Щедрик (2011)
- My Country Is Ukraine
  - Народна мудрість (2011)
  - Чаша Ярослава (2011)
  - Чарівна грязюка (2011)
  - Коломия (2011)
  - Чорне озеро (2012)
  - Казочка про місто Борщів (2012)
  - Чорнозем (2013)

== Awards and recognitions ==
In 2017, Koval received the Shevchenko National Prize for his work on the animated series My Country Is Ukraine, for making a substantial impact on both Ukrainian and European animation. Koval has been given the following membership and awards:

| Award | Year | Category | Nominated work | Result |
|---|---|---|---|---|
| KROK International Animated Films Festival | 1995 | Prize of the Festival | Це - я | Won |
| Open Night Festival | 1998 | Third Place | Z-z-z | Won |
| KROK International Animated Films Festival | 2002 | Grand Prix of the Festival | The Tram Was Going, Number Nine | Won |
| 53rd Berlin International Film Festival | 2003 | Silver Bear | The Tram Was Going, Number Nine | Won |
| Animafest Zagreb | 2005 | Diploma of the Jury | The Tram Was Going, Number Nine | Won |
| Lola Kenya Film Festival | 2005 | Golden Mboni | The Tram Was Going, Number Nine | Won |
| Festival of Nations | 2005 | Silver Bear | The Tram Was Going, Number Nine | Won |
| Ja Ja Ja Festival | 2005 | 2nd Prize | The Tram Was Going, Number Nine | Won |
| Madrid International Animated Image Festival | 2005 | Audience Prize for Best Children Film | The Tram Was Going, Number Nine | Won |
| FILMETS Badalona Film Festival | 2006 | Audience Prize | Бійка за печиво | Won |
| Kraków Film Festival | 2010 | Audience Prize | Стати твердим | Won |
