= Viy (1996 film) =

- Directed by: Leonid Zarubin; Alla Grachyova
- Written by: Alla Grachyova
- Based on: Viy by Nikolai Gogol
- Produced by: Vyacheslav Kilinsky
- Starring: Bohdan Beniuk; Natalya Sumska; Vasyl Mazur
- Cinematography: Anatoliy Havrylov
- Edited by: Lidiya Mokrousova
- Music by: Volodymyr Runchak; Leonid Hrabovsky; Alexander Scriabin
- Production company: Ukranimafilm
- Release date: 1996
- Running time: 19 minutes
- Country: Ukraine
- Language: Ukrainian

Viy (Ukrainian: «Вій») is a 1996 Ukrainian animated dark fantasy short film directed by Leonid Zarubin, and Alla Grachyova based on the story of the same name by Nikolai Gogol, filmed by the Ukranimafilm studio in 1996.

== Plot ==
Kyiv seminarians, theologian Khalyava and rhetorician Tiberiy Gorobets, meet in a tavern where they discuss the mysterious death of their friend Khoma Brutus.

== Voice cast ==
- Bohdan Beniuk
- Natalya Sumska
- Vasyl Mazur
- Ivan Kadubets
- Yevgeny Shakh

== Critical response ==
According to film critic Stanislav F. Rostotsky (Kommersant), "the twenty-minute Ukrainian cartoon by Leonid Zarubin and Alla Grachyova is quite close to the text".

National Oleksandr Dovzhenko Film Centre writes: "Among other screen adaptations of Gogol, this was the closest to the text. The film's production artists created a beautiful, delicate picture of the baroque Cossack Ukraine and populated it with a whole range of diverse peasants. The color scheme is more restrained, almost dull, which is generally a common thing in 90s animation".

== Literature ==
- Lyudmila Saraskina. Literary classics in the temptation of film adaptations. A century of reincarnations (2022)
