= Mykola Zinchuk =

Ukrainian folklorist

- Микола Зінчук
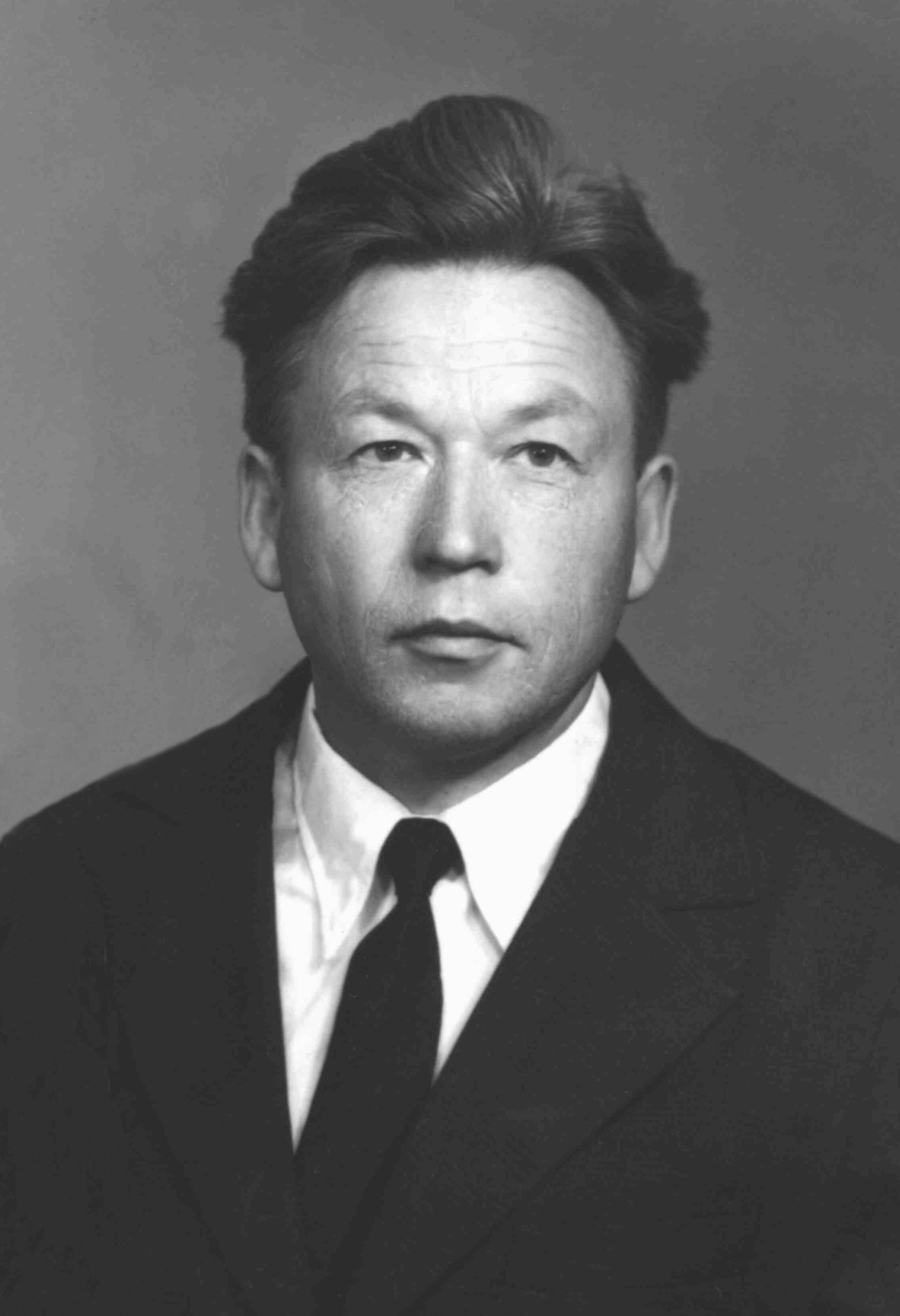
- Born: 7 March 1925 (age 100); Ukrainian Soviet Socialist Republic (USSR) (present-day Ukraine)
- Died: 2 February 2012 (aged 86)
- Citizenship: Ukraine
- Occupations: folklorist, writer
- Known for: 40-volume selection of the Ukrainian Folk Tales

Mykola Zinchuk (Ukrainian: Микола Антонович Зінчук; 7 March 1925 – 2 February 2012) was a Ukrainian folklorist, whose life achievement is the 40-volume selection of the Ukrainian Folk Tales (mostly his own recordings), published in the period of 2003–2019.

== Biography ==
Zinchuk was born close to Kiev in the Zhytomyr Oblast, and was taken as a slave laborer in a concentration camp, when he refused collaboration with the Nazis.

After the Second World War, he entered the History Department of Lviv Pedagogical Institute and after teaching tourism, he started being interested in folklore.

He worked as a school principal in Lviv Oblast in a period of 1957–1963.

In 1975 he bought a tape recorder and started recording folk songs and narratives in the Ivano-Frankivsk Oblast.

He succeeded in collecting and editing 40 volumes of the Ukrainian Folk Tales from many country regions, published by different companies, primarily by Bukrek (Chernivtsi).

The book of authors fairy tales was published in 2007, his memoirs book «Скарбниці пам'яті» (The Treasure of memory) emerged posthumously, in 2014.

Mykola Zinchuk died in Dovhopillya village (Vyzhnytsia Raion, Chernivtsi Oblast), where he was living most of his life.

== Sources and external links ==
- Автобіографічний нарис Миколи Зінчука
- Микола Зінчук зібрав вісім тисяч казок
- Золоті казки України
- Туржанський І. В. Життя в ім’я української народної казки! / Culture and Life, Nr. 37 from 14 September 2018. — P. 13
