= The Mitten (folk tale) =

Ukrainian fairy tale

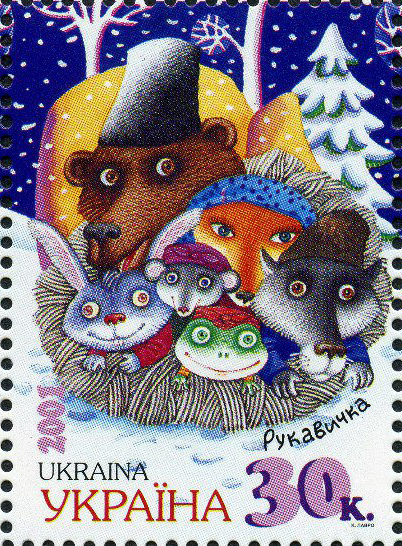
- Characters from The Mitten featured on a stamp of the Ukrainian national postal service, Ukrposhta, 2001

Folk tale
- Name: The Mitten
- Also known as: Рукавичка
- Region: Ukraine

The Mitten (Ukrainian: «Рукавичка», romanized: Rukavychka) is a Ukrainian fairy tale. It remains popular in modern Ukraine and has been translated into other languages.

Some of the written records of The Mitten date back to the 19th century and include the folklore collections of Pavlo Chubynsky. and Ivan Rudchenko.

== Plot ==
There are numerous variations of this Ukrainian folk tale. In the general story, a person loses their mitten in a forest in the snow during a cold winter. One by one, various animals come and settle inside the mitten, all of them planning to stay warm. Eventually, the mitten can no longer hold all those who want to warm themselves inside. The mitten then splits open and spills out all the animals into the cold.

=== Variations ===
The individual losing the mitten varies - some versions feature a child who loses their mitten. The animals included varies in different versions but often includes a mouse, a frog, a hare, a fox, a wolf, a boar and a bear. The animals fitting into the mitten get progressively larger. In some retellings, each of the animals have adjectives or nicknames. In many retellings, prior to settling in, the new-comer asks permission from the animals already inside. When the mitten can hold no more, sometimes a sneeze causes the animals to no longer fit inside. In some retellings, the person who lost the mitten finds it after the animals have left.

=== Interpretation ===
The story illustrates the Tragedy of the Commons.

== Translations ==
The Mitten was translated into various languages, including English, Japanese, Azerbaijani, French, German and Russian.

One of the most popular versions of The Mitten retold in English is by Jan Brett.

== In popular culture ==
In 1996 a Ukrainian Animated Film Studio Ukranimafilm released a cartoon The Mitten (N. Marchenkova, а scriptwriter and director).

In 2001, Ukrposhta, the postal service of Ukraine, released a Ukrainian Fairy Tale series of stamps, including The Mitten.
