= Jan Brett =

American illustrator and writer (born 1949)

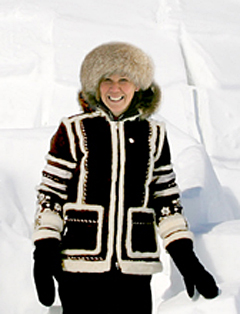
- Brett at the Arctic Circle in Nunavut, Canada, researching The Three Snow Bears, 2007
- Born: December 1, 1949 (age 76); Norwell, Massachusetts
- Occupations: Illustrator, writer
- Writing career
- Period: 1978–present
- Genre: Children's picture books
- Notable works: Annie and the Wild Animals; The Mitten; The Hat
- Website: janbrett.com

Jan Brett (born December 1, 1949) is an American illustrator and author of children's picture books. Her titles include The Mitten, The Hat, and Gingerbread Baby as well as retelling traditional stories such as the Gingerbread Man and Goldilocks.

== Life ==
Brett was born and still lives in Massachusetts. She studied at the Colby Junior College (now Colby-Sawyer College) before transferring to School of the Museum of Fine Arts, Boston. It takes her an hour to hand-paint an inch in gouache for her intricate artwork.

On August 18, 1980 Jan Brett married bassist Joseph Hearne, a member of the Boston Symphony Orchestra. It was the second marriage for both. The couple travel extensively, either with the orchestra or for Brett’s book research to Africa, the Arctic, China, Costa Rica, Japan, Martinique and Scandinavia. They embark on yearly nationwide bus tours for her books.

The couple live outside Boston and summer in an Adirondack-style log home on their 17-acres in the Berkshires. Together, they have three children.

== Works ==
=== Illustrated ===
- Happy Birthday, Dear Duck (1988) by Eve Bunting
- Mother's Day Mice (1986) by Eve Bunting
- Scary, Scary Halloween (1986) by Eve Bunting
- Noelle of the Nutcracker (1988) by Pamela Jane

=== Written & Illustrated ===
- Fritz and the Beautiful Horses (Houghton Mifflin, 1981)
- Annie and the Wild Animals (1985)
- The Twelve Days of Christmas (Dodd, Mead, 1986), an edition of the English song published 1780
- Goldilocks and the Three Bears (1987)
- The First Dog (1988)
- The Mitten: a Ukrainian folktale (1989); issued as a board book in 1996
- The Wild Christmas Reindeer (1990)
- The Owl and the Pussycat (1991), an edition of the 1871 poem by Edward Lear
- Berlioz the Bear (1991)
- Christmas Trolls (1993)
- Trouble with Trolls (1994)
- Town Mouse Country Mouse (1994)
- Armadillo Rodeo (1995)
- The Mitten (1996)
- Comets Nine Lives (1996)
- Gingerbread Baby (1997)
- The Hat (1997)
- The Night Before Christmas (1998), an edition of the 1823 poem by Clement C. Moore
- Daisy Comes Home (2002)
- Hedgie's Surprise (2002)
- Who's That Knocking on Christmas Eve? (2002)
- On Noah's Ark (2003)
- The Umbrella (2002)
- Honey, Honey, Lion! (2005)
- Hedgie Loves to Read (2006)
- Hedgie Blasts Off! (2006)
- The Three Snow Bears (2007)
- Gingerbread Friends (2008)
- The Easter Egg (2010)
- The 3 Little Dassies (2010)
- Home for Christmas (2011)
- Mossy (2012)
- Cinders: A Chicken Cinderella (2013), an adaptation of Cinderella
- The Animals' Santa (2014)
- The Turnip (2015), an adaptation of the Russian folk story The Gigantic Turnip
- Gingerbread Christmas (2016)
- The Mermaid (2017), an under the sea version of Goldilocks and The Three Bears
- The Snowy Nap (2018)
- The Tale of the Tiger Slippers (2019)
- Cozy (2020)
- The Nutcracker (2021)
- Cozy in Love (2022)
- Alice in a Winter Wonderland (2024)
- The Christmas Sweater (2025)

== Awards ==
Brett's works have been nominated for and won multiple awards over the years.

- 1990: Wild Christmas Reindeer was featured on the New York Times Bestseller list.
- 1991: The Mitten won the Kentucky Bluegrass Award. Berlioz the Bear was chosen for Newsweek Magazine Best Children's Book and New Yorker Magazine Best Children's Books.
- 1994: Trouble with Trolls won the Black-Eyed Susan Book award from the Maryland Library Association.
- 1995: Trouble with Trolls is honored as a Little Bluestem picture book and the Nebraska Golden Sower Award from the Nebraska Library Association.
- 1998: The Hat wins the American Booksellers Association's Book of the Year Award.
- 1999: The Hat wins Buckeye Children's & Teen Book Award. Gingerbread Baby was chosen as one of the Best Children's Books of the Year by Bank Street College Center for Children's Literature's Children's Book Committee.
- 2001: Gingerbread Baby wins one of the Triple Crown Awards, (specifically the Children's Gallery Award) from the National Christian School Association.
- 2003: Daisy Comes Home wins National Council for Social Studies & Children's Book Council's Notable Social Studies Trade Book for Young People for the cultural diversity present in her book.
- 2008: The Three Snow Bears helps Brett make it as a finalist for the Children's Favorites Awards' and the Kids' Book Choice Awards' Illustrator of the Year.
- 2010: The 3 Little Dassies wins the Chicago Public Library Best of the Best: Kids' Award in the Folk and Fairy Tales and Poetry division. The Easter Egg wins Oppenheim Toy Portfolio's Gold Book Award.
- 2013: Mossy wins Best Children's Books of the Year for the Five to Nine category by Bank Street College Center for Children's Literature's Children's Book Committee.
- 2014: Brett's adaptation of The Night Before Christmas wins the Libris Award's Children's Picture Book of the Year.
- 2019: The Snowy Nap is the third book of Brett's to win the Best Children's Books of the Year by the Bank Street College Center for Children's Literature's Children's Book Committee.
- 2021: Cozy wins two awards: the Massachusetts Book Award and the Best Children's Books of the Year by the Bank Street College Center for Children's Literature's Children's Book Committee. Brett was awarded the Regina Medal from the Catholic Library Association.

== Reception ==
Many of Brett's books have been positively received by libraries and parents alike.

In May 2023 at the Fenimore Art Museum in Cooperstown, New York, an exhibition was hosted dedicated to Brett's Illustrations.
