= List of Shevchenko National Prize recipients =

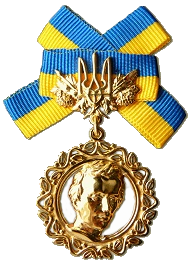
Shevchenko National Prize medal

List of all Shevchenko National Prize laureates ordered by year of reception.

== List (1962-1979) ==
Shevchenko National Prize laureates
Year	Nomination category	Laureate (Note: Laureates awarded posthumously are marked with a dagger (†).)	Role (Note: For laureates awarded as part of collaborative projects, the individual's role as indicated by the awards committee is shown; other laureates, as well as those who were awarded as part of a collaborative project but where the role was not indicated by the committee, are marked with a dash (—).)	Rationale	Refs
1962	Literature	Oles Honchar	—	for the novel "Man and Weapon"	
1962	Literature	Pavlo Tychyna	—	for "Selected Works" in three volumes	
1962	Musical art	Platon Maiboroda	—	for "Selected Songs"	
1963	Musical art	Heorhiy Maiboroda	—	for the opera "Arsenal"	
1963	Literature	Volodymyr Sosiura	—	for the books of lyrics "Swallows in the Sun", "Happiness of a Labor Family"	
1963	Literature	Hryhoriy Tiutiunnyk	—	for the novel "Vyr"	
1964	Fine arts	Vasyl Kasiyan	—	for his many years of artistic creativity on Shevchenko themes and his artistic works – prints, etching illustrations for “Kobzar”, illustrations for O. Ivanenko’s novel “The Paths of Taras”	
1964	— (Note: Nikita Khrushchev was awarded by a separate special resolution in honor of the 150th anniversary of the birth of prize namesake Taras Shevchenko.)	Nikita Khrushchev	—	for outstanding public and political activity in the Ukrainian Soviet Socialist Republic	
1964	Music	Stanislav Liudkevych	—	for the symphony-cantata "Caucasus" and the vocal-symphonic cantata "Testament"	
1964	Literature	Andriy Malyshko	—	for the book of lyrics "Distant Orbits"	
1964	Literature	Nikolay Tikhonov	—	for popularizing the works of Taras Shevchenko and translating works of Ukrainian poetry into Russian	
1965	Literature	Mykola Bazhan	—	for the poem "Flight through the Storm"	
1965	Literature	Iryna Vilde	—	for the novel "The Richinsky Sisters"	
1965	Concert and performing activities	Pavlo Virsky	—	for the creation of a concert program (1964) of the State Honored Dance Ensemble of the Ukrainian SSR	
1966	Literature and art	Petro Panch	—	for the story "On the Kalina Bridge"	
1966	Literature and art	Maria Primachenko	—	for the cycle of artistic works "For the Joy of People"	
1966	Literature and art	Levko Revutsky	—	for a piano concerto accompanied by a symphony orchestra	
1967	Cinematography	Viktor Ivchenko	—	for the feature film "Viper"	
1967	Fine arts	Olena Kulchytska	—	for a series of graphic and pictorial works that reflect the heroic history and artistic culture of the Ukrainian people	
1967	Literature	Ivan Le	—	for the novel in three books "Khmelnytsky"	
1968	Concert and performing activities	Anatoly Avdievsky	Artistic directors of the Ukrainian Folk Choir	for the creation of highly artistic concert programs of the State Honored Ukrainian Folk Choir named after H. H. Veryovka	
1968	Concert and performing activities	Hryhoriy Veryovka†	Artistic directors of the Ukrainian Folk Choir	for the creation of highly artistic concert programs of the State Honored Ukrainian Folk Choir named after H. H. Veryovka	
1968	Fine arts	Hanna Vasylashchuk	—	for the cycle of Ukrainian folk woven towels created in 1965-1967	
1968	Fine arts	Hanna Veres	—	for the cycle of Ukrainian folk woven towels created in 1965-1967	
1968	Literature	Leonid Novychenko	—	for the book of literary and critical essays and portraits "Not an illustration - a discovery!"	
1969	Literature	Andriy Holovko	—	for the novel "Artem Harmash"	
1969	Fine arts	Mykhailo Derehus	—	for the creation of paintings and illustrations on Shevchenko themes and a series of new paintings and graphic works: "Song", "Kamenets-Podilsky Fortress", "Old Willows" (Derehus); a cycle of paintings "My Native Homeland" (Trokhymenko)	
1969	Fine arts	Karp Trokhymenko	—	for the creation of paintings and illustrations on Shevchenko themes and a series of new paintings and graphic works: "Song", "Kamenets-Podilsky Fortress", "Old Willows" (Derehus); a cycle of paintings "My Native Homeland" (Trokhymenko)	
1969	Music	Oleksandr Minkovsky	Artistic Director of the State Honored Bandura Orchestra of the Ukrainian SSR	for the concert programs of 1966-1968	
1970	Literature	Yuri Zbanatsky	—	for the novel "Waves"	
1970	Literature	Volodymyr Kanivets	—	for the novel "The Ulyanovs"	
1970	Literature	Mykola Nahnybida	—	for the cycle of poems on the Leninist theme "Features of a Native Face" in the poetry collection "On the Battlefield"	
1970	Fine arts	Oleksii Shovkunenko	—	for a series of portraits (of the poet M. Rylsky, Major General S. Kovpak, and partisan M. Vovchik) and a cycle of new landscapes	
1970	Theater	Serhiy Smeyan	director	for the performance "Yaroslav the Wise" at the Zaporizhia Regional Music and Drama Theater named after M.O. Shchors	
1970	Theater	Kostiantyn Parakonyev	performer of the main role	for the performance "Yaroslav the Wise" at the Zaporizhia Regional Music and Drama Theater named after M.O. Shchors	
1971	Literature	Vasyl Kozachenko	—	for the cycle of stories "The Price of Life", "Hot Hands", "Lightning", "Letters from the Patron", "Yarynka Kalinovskaya", "White Spot"	
1971	Theater	Oleksandr Korniychuk	playwright	for the performance "Memory of the Heart" at the Kiev State Order of Lenin Academic Ukrainian Drama Theater named after Ivan Franko	
1971	Theater	Dmitriy Aleksidze	director	for the performance "Memory of the Heart" at the Kiev State Order of Lenin Academic Ukrainian Drama Theater named after Ivan Franko	
1971	Theater	Yulia Tkachenko	performers of the main roles	for the performance "Memory of the Heart" at the Kiev State Order of Lenin Academic Ukrainian Drama Theater named after Ivan Franko	
1971	Theater	Yevhen Ponomarenko	performers of the main roles	for the performance "Memory of the Heart" at the Kiev State Order of Lenin Academic Ukrainian Drama Theater named after Ivan Franko	
1971	Theater	Polina Kumanchenko	performers of the main roles	for the performance "Memory of the Heart" at the Kiev State Order of Lenin Academic Ukrainian Drama Theater named after Ivan Franko	
1971	Theater	Mykhailo Zadniprovsky	performers of the main roles	for the performance "Memory of the Heart" at the Kiev State Order of Lenin Academic Ukrainian Drama Theater named after Ivan Franko	
1971	Theater	Volodymyr Dalsky	performers of the main roles	for the performance "Memory of the Heart" at the Kiev State Order of Lenin Academic Ukrainian Drama Theater named after Ivan Franko	
1971	Theater	Borys Lyatoshynsky	composer	for the opera "The Golden Hoop" at the Ivan Franko Lviv State Academic Opera and Ballet Theater	
1971	Theater	Yuri Lutsiv	conductor-director	for the opera "The Golden Hoop" at the Ivan Franko Lviv State Academic Opera and Ballet Theater	
1971	Theater	Dmytro Smolych	production director	for the opera "The Golden Hoop" at the Ivan Franko Lviv State Academic Opera and Ballet Theater	
1971	Theater	Yevhen Lysyk	production designer	for the opera "The Golden Hoop" at the Ivan Franko Lviv State Academic Opera and Ballet Theater	
1971	Cinematography	Oleksandr Levada	screenwriter	for the film "The Kotsiubynsky Family"	
1971	Cinematography	Timofiy Levchuk	director	for the film "The Kotsiubynsky Family"	
1971	Cinematography	Oleksandr Hai	performer of the role of M.M. Kotsiubynsky	for the film "The Kotsiubynsky Family"	
1971	Architecture	Yevhenia Marynchenko	—	for the creation of the project of the Palace of Culture "Ukraine" in Kyiv	
1971	Architecture	Petro Zhylytsky	—	for the creation of the project of the Palace of Culture "Ukraine" in Kyiv	
1972	Literature	Platon Voronko	—	for the poetry collection "The Debt"	
1972	Fine arts	Mykola Hlushchenko	—	for the series of paintings “In Lenin’s Places Abroad”, “Landscapes of Ukraine” (1969–1971)	
1972	Fine arts	Kostiantyn Filatov	—	for the paintings "V. I. Lenin", "Red Square"	
1972	Fine arts	Dmytro Krvavych	sculptors	for the monument of Battle Glory of the Soviet Armed Forces in Lviv	
1972	Fine arts	Emmanuil Misko	sculptors	for the monument of Battle Glory of the Soviet Armed Forces in Lviv	
1972	Fine arts	Yaroslav Motyka	sculptors	for the monument of Battle Glory of the Soviet Armed Forces in Lviv	
1972	Fine arts	Myron Vendzilovych	architect	for the monument of Battle Glory of the Soviet Armed Forces in Lviv	
1972	Fine arts	Oleksandr Pirozhkov	artist	for the monument of Battle Glory of the Soviet Armed Forces in Lviv	
1972	Music	Yevhenia Miroshnychenko	—	for performing activities in 1970–1971	
1972	Music	Mykola Kondratiuk	—	for the concert programs of 1969–1971	
1972	Music	Diana Petrynenko	—	for the concert programs of 1969–1971	
1973	Literature	Kostiantyn Hordiyenko	—	for the novel trilogy "Another's Field of Thorns", "The Girl Under the Apple Tree", "Buimyr"	
1973	Literature	Nikolay Ushakov	—	for the poetry collections “My Eyes”, “I Am Rhymingly Afraid of Verbal” and many years of fruitful activity in the field of translations from Ukrainian literature	
1973	Fine arts	Viktor Mukhin	sculptors	for the monument "Ukraine - to the Liberators" in the village of Minovoye, Voroshilovgrad region	
1973	Fine arts	Vasyl Fedchenko	sculptors	for the monument "Ukraine - to the Liberators" in the village of Minovoye, Voroshilovgrad region	
1973	Fine arts	Ilya Ovcharenko	sculptors	for the monument "Ukraine - to the Liberators" in the village of Minovoye, Voroshilovgrad region	
1973	Fine arts	Ivan Chumak	sculptors	for the monument "Ukraine - to the Liberators" in the village of Minovoye, Voroshilovgrad region	
1973	Fine arts	Heorhiy Holovchenko	architects	for the monument "Ukraine - to the Liberators" in the village of Minovoye, Voroshilovgrad region	
1973	Fine arts	Anatoliy Yehorov	architects	for the monument "Ukraine - to the Liberators" in the village of Minovoye, Voroshilovgrad region	
1973	Fine arts	Ivan Minko	architects	for the monument "Ukraine - to the Liberators" in the village of Minovoye, Voroshilovgrad region	
1973	Music	Dmytro Hnatiuk	—	for performing activities in 1971-1972	
1973	Cinematography	Mykhailo Tkach	—	for the full-length documentary film "Soviet Ukraine"	
1973	Cinematography	Oleksandr Kosinov	—	for the full-length documentary film "Soviet Ukraine"	
1973	Cinematography	Ihor Pysanko	—	for the full-length documentary film "Soviet Ukraine"	
1974	Literature	Pavlo Zahrebelnyi	—	for the novels "Pervomisto", "Death in Kyiv"	
1974	Fine arts	Mykhailo Bozhy	—	for the paintings "V. I. Lenin", "XX century", "New time"	
1974	Fine arts	Halyna Kalchenko	—	for the monument to Lesya Ukrainka in Kyiv	
1974	Fine arts	Anatoliy Ihnashchenko	—	for the monument to Lesya Ukrainka in Kyiv	
1974	Music	Andriy Shtoharenko	—	for Symphony No. 3 ("Kyiv")	
1974	Theater	Borys Romanytsky	—	for performing the role of Grass in M. Kulish's play "Maklena Grassa" at the Lviv State Academic Ukrainian Drama Theater named after M. Zankovetska and for his outstanding contribution to the development of Ukrainian Soviet theatrical art	
1975	Literature	Vadym Sobko	—	for the novel "Lyhobor"	
1975	Fine arts	Oleksandr Kovaliov	—	for sculptural portraits of our contemporaries (Demian Korotchenko, M.T. Rylsky, V.P. Filatov)	
1975	Music	Oleksandr Bilash	—	for the songs "Lenin's Spring", "My Homeland", "Song of the Victors", "Song of the Red Riders", "Truth", "I Lived in Those Times", created in 1971-1974	
1975	Music	Maya Holenko	—	for the concert programs of 1973-1974	
1975	Music	Tamara Hrytsenko	bandura trio	for the concert programs of 1973-1974	
1975	Music	Nina Pysarenko	bandura trio	for the concert programs of 1973-1974	
1975	Cinematography	Vladimir Belyayev	screenwriter	for the feature film "Until the Last Minute"	
1975	Cinematography	Valeriy Isakov	director	for the feature film "Until the Last Minute"	
1975	Cinematography	Vladislav Dvorzhetsky	performer roles of Yaroslav Haidai	for the feature film "Until the Last Minute"	
1975	Cinematography	Valeriya Zaklunna	performer of the role of Stefa	for the feature film "Until the Last Minute"	
1976	Literature	Ivan Drach	—	for the poetry collection "Root and Crown"	
1976	Fine arts	Viktor Puzyrkov	—	for the paintings "Soldiers", "In the dugout"	
1976	Music	Ihor Shamo	composer	for the songs "Ballad about Brotherhood", "My Kiev", "A Mound Stands Over the Volga", "Enchanted Desna", "Song of Happiness", "Don't Make a Noise, Kalinenko", "Frontline Soldiers"	
1976	Music	Dmytro Lutsenko	poet	for the songs "Ballad about Brotherhood", "My Kiev", "A Mound Stands Over the Volga", "Enchanted Desna", "Song of Happiness", "Don't Make a Noise, Kalinenko", "Frontline Soldiers"	
1976	Theater	Dmitri Shostakovich†	composer	for the opera "Katerina Izmailova" at the State Academic Opera and Ballet Theater of the Ukrainian SSR named after T. H. Shevchenko	
1976	Theater	Konstantin Simeonov	conductor-director	for the opera "Katerina Izmailova" at the State Academic Opera and Ballet Theater of the Ukrainian SSR named after T. H. Shevchenko	
1976	Theater	Lev Venedyktov	choir master	for the opera "Katerina Izmailova" at the State Academic Opera and Ballet Theater of the Ukrainian SSR named after T. H. Shevchenko	
1976	Theater	Oleksandr Zahrebelny	performer the role of Boris Izmailov	for the opera "Katerina Izmailova" at the State Academic Opera and Ballet Theater of the Ukrainian SSR named after T. H. Shevchenko	
1976	Theater	Yevdokia Kolesnyk	performer roles of Ekaterina Izmailova	for the opera "Katerina Izmailova" at the State Academic Opera and Ballet Theater of the Ukrainian SSR named after T. H. Shevchenko	
1976	Music	Danyla Boiko	—	for the concert programs of 1973–1975	
1976	Music	Maria Boiko	—	for the concert programs of 1973–1975	
1976	Music	Nina Boiko	—	for the concert programs of 1973–1975	
1977	Literature	Oleksiy Kolomiyets	—	for the dramatic dilogy "Blue Deer" and "Tailors"	
1977	Literature	Dmytro Pavlychko	—	for the poetry collection "Love and Hate"	
1977	Literature	Yakov Davidzon	—	for photo correspondences that reflect the military exploits and labor activities of Soviet people, and photo portraits of leaders of the national economy, science, and culture	
1977	Literature	Andriy Klyunenko	—	for the book of essays "Dnieper Lights"	
1977	Literature	Volodymyr Repin	—	for the book of essays "Dnieper Lights"	
1977	Literature	Ivan Shcherbak	—	for the book of essays "Dnieper Lights"	
1977	Literature	Abram Friman	—	for the book of essays "Dnieper Lights"	
1977	Literature	Oleksandr Sherstok	—	for the book of essays "Dnieper Lights"	
1977	Architecture	Vasyl Ahibalov	—	for a monument in honor of the proclamation of Soviet power in Ukraine in the city of Kharkiv	
1977	Architecture	Yakov Ryk	—	for a monument in honor of the proclamation of Soviet power in Ukraine in the city of Kharkiv	
1977	Architecture	Mykhailo Ovsiakin	—	for a monument in honor of the proclamation of Soviet power in Ukraine in the city of Kharkiv	
1977	Architecture	Serhiy Svetlorusov	—	for a monument in honor of the proclamation of Soviet power in Ukraine in the city of Kharkiv	
1977	Architecture	Ihor Alfiorov	—	for a monument in honor of the proclamation of Soviet power in Ukraine in the city of Kharkiv	
1977	Architecture	Eryk Cherkasov	—	for a monument in honor of the proclamation of Soviet power in Ukraine in the city of Kharkiv	
1977	Architecture	Anatoliy Maksymenko	—	for a monument in honor of the proclamation of Soviet power in Ukraine in the city of Kharkiv	
1977	Music	Yevhen Stankovych	—	for Symphony No. 3 "I Affirm" to the words of P. Tychyna	
1977	Music	Anatoliy Bazhenov	artists of honor ensemble of the Ukrainian SSR, string quartet named after M.V. Lysenko	for the concert programs of 1974–1976	
1977	Music	Borys Skvortsov	artists of honor ensemble of the Ukrainian SSR, string quartet named after M.V. Lysenko	for the concert programs of 1974–1976	
1977	Music	Yuri Kholodov	artists of honor ensemble of the Ukrainian SSR, string quartet named after M.V. Lysenko	for the concert programs of 1974–1976	
1977	Music	Leontiy Krasnoshchok	artists of honor ensemble of the Ukrainian SSR, string quartet named after M.V. Lysenko	for the concert programs of 1974–1976	
1977	Cinematography	Leonid Bykov	—	for directing and performing the main roles in the films "Only "Old Men" Go to Battle" and "Ati-bati, the Soldiers Are Coming"	
1978	Literature	Vasyl Zemlyak†	—	for the novels "The Swan Flock", "The Green Mills"	
1978	Literature	Mykola Shamota	—	for the monograph "Humanism and Socialist Realism"	
1978	Architecture	Valentyn Borysenko	sculptor	for the monument to the soldiers of the First Cavalry Army in the village of Olesko, Busko Raion, Lviv Oblast	
1978	Architecture	Anatoly Konsulov	architect	for the monument to the soldiers of the First Cavalry Army in the village of Olesko, Busko Raion, Lviv Oblast	
1978	Fine arts	Heorhiy Cherniavsky	—	for the series of paintings “In Lenin’s Places”, “Ulyanov in Ukraine” and the cycle of industrial landscapes of Ukraine	
1978	Theater	Kostiantyn Dankevych	composer	for the opera "Bohdan Khmelnytsky" (new edition) at the Dnipropetrovsk State Opera and Ballet Theater	
1978	Theater	Petro Varyvoda	conductor-director	for the opera "Bohdan Khmelnytsky" (new edition) at the Dnipropetrovsk State Opera and Ballet Theater	
1978	Theater	Anatoliy Arefyev	artist	for the opera "Bohdan Khmelnytsky" (new edition) at the Dnipropetrovsk State Opera and Ballet Theater	
1978	Theater	Vasyl Kiose	choir master	for the opera "Bohdan Khmelnytsky" (new edition) at the Dnipropetrovsk State Opera and Ballet Theater	
1978	Theater	Anatoliy Danshyn	leading actors	for the opera "Bohdan Khmelnytsky" (new edition) at the Dnipropetrovsk State Opera and Ballet Theater	
1978	Theater	Nonna Surzhyna	leading actors	for the opera "Bohdan Khmelnytsky" (new edition) at the Dnipropetrovsk State Opera and Ballet Theater	
1978	Theater	Mykola Ukrainsky	leading actors	for the opera "Bohdan Khmelnytsky" (new edition) at the Dnipropetrovsk State Opera and Ballet Theater	
1978	Theater	Mykola Zarudny	author of the play	for the play "Rear" at the Lviv State Academic Ukrainian Drama Theater named after M.K. Zankovetska	
1978	Theater	Serhiy Danchenko	director	for the play "Rear" at the Lviv State Academic Ukrainian Drama Theater named after M.K. Zankovetska	
1978	Theater	Myron Kipriyan	production designer	for the play "Rear" at the Lviv State Academic Ukrainian Drama Theater named after M.K. Zankovetska	
1978	Theater	Nadiya Dotsenko	leading actors	for the play "Rear" at the Lviv State Academic Ukrainian Drama Theater named after M.K. Zankovetska	
1978	Theater	Volodymyr Maksymenko	leading actors	for the play "Rear" at the Lviv State Academic Ukrainian Drama Theater named after M.K. Zankovetska	
1978	Theater	Fedir Stryhun	leading actors	for the play "Rear" at the Lviv State Academic Ukrainian Drama Theater named after M.K. Zankovetska	
1978	Cinematography	Ihor Malyshevsky	screenwriter and narration texts	for the film trilogy "Soviet Ukraine. Years of Struggle and Victory" by the Ukrainian Studio of Chronicle and Documentary Films	
1978	Cinematography	Ihor Hrabovsky	screenwriter and director	for the film trilogy "Soviet Ukraine. Years of Struggle and Victory" by the Ukrainian Studio of Chronicle and Documentary Films	
1978	Cinematography	Volodymyr Shevchenko	director	for the film trilogy "Soviet Ukraine. Years of Struggle and Victory" by the Ukrainian Studio of Chronicle and Documentary Films	
1978	Architecture	Saniya Afzametdinova	architects	for the creation of the Crimean Regional Music and Drama Theater in the city of Simferopol	
1978	Architecture	Vitaliy Yudin	architects	for the creation of the Crimean Regional Music and Drama Theater in the city of Simferopol	
1978	Architecture	Ernest Bykov	chief designer of the project	for the creation of the Crimean Regional Music and Drama Theater in the city of Simferopol	
1979	Literature	Liubomyr Dmyterko	—	for the poetry collections "My Light", "The Basis"	
1979	Literature	Mykola Podolian	—	for journalistic articles and pamphlets in the periodical press in 1976–1978	
1979	Literature	Yevhen Shabliovsky	—	for the monograph "Chernyshevsky and Ukraine"	
1979	Architecture	Horpyna Vatchenko	work manager	for the complex of the Dnipropetrovsk Historical Museum named after D.I. Yavornytsky	
1979	Architecture	Volodymyr Zuyev	architect, author reconstruction of the complex	for the complex of the Dnipropetrovsk Historical Museum named after D.I. Yavornytsky	
1979	Architecture	Volodymyr Korotkov	artists, authors of museum interiors	for the complex of the Dnipropetrovsk Historical Museum named after D.I. Yavornytsky	
1979	Architecture	Volodymyr Ryvin	artists, authors of museum interiors	for the complex of the Dnipropetrovsk Historical Museum named after D.I. Yavornytsky	
1979	Architecture	Mykola But	artists, authors of dioramas "Battle for the Dnieper"	for the complex of the Dnipropetrovsk Historical Museum named after D.I. Yavornytsky	
1979	Architecture	Mykola Oviechkin	artists, authors of dioramas "Battle for the Dnieper"	for the complex of the Dnipropetrovsk Historical Museum named after D.I. Yavornytsky	
1979	Architecture	Vitaliy Prokuda	screenwriter and scientist diorama consultant "Battle for the Dnieper"	for the complex of the Dnipropetrovsk Historical Museum named after D.I. Yavornytsky	
1979	Theater	Anatoliy Mokrenko	—	for theatrical and concert activities in 1977–1978	
1979	Music	Pavlo Muravsky	—	for concert programs of 1977–1978 from the works of M.D. Leontovych	
1979	Cinematography	Volodymyr Denysenko	screenwriter and director	for the feature film "The Reapers" by the O. P. Dovzhenko Kyiv Film Studio of Feature Films	
1979	Architecture	Vasyl Hnezdilov	architects	for the complex of the landscape park named after the 50th anniversary of October in the city of Cherkasy	
1979	Architecture	Heorhiy Ursaty	architects	for the complex of the landscape park named after the 50th anniversary of October in the city of Cherkasy	
1979	Architecture	Yevdokia Smirnova	engineer	for the complex of the landscape park named after the 50th anniversary of October in the city of Cherkasy	

== 1980–2010 ==
=== 1980 ===
1. Viacheslav Tikhonov (anchorman), Vladimir Barsuk (script writer), Aleksandr Buzilevich (camera), Viktor Kushch (camera), Albert Putintsev (script writer) (publicist documentary featured film Revival by the book of Leonid Brezhnev)
2. Yevhen Kyryliuk (editor), Vasyl Borodin (deputy editor), Petro Zhur (editor collegiate), Yuri Ivakin (editor collegiate), Fedir Sarana (editor collegiate) (Shevchenko dictionary in two volumes)
3. Yaroslav Kornilyev (engineer-constructor), Liudmila Nivina (architect), Zinoviy Podlesny (architect), Serhiy Zemyankin (architect) (living quarters Silvery in Lviv)
4. Anatoliy Kos-Anatolsky (composer) (collection Vocal works)
5. Oleksandr Lopukhov (pictures Spirit-strong, War, Moon sonata, Victory, Whirlwind of the October, Freedom-like)
6. Yuriy Mushketyk (novel Position)
7. Mykhailo Stelmakh (novel Four fords)
8. Stefan Turchak (conductor-director) (operas of M.Glinka Ivan Susanin, P.Chaykovsky Spade Queen, H.Maiboroda Milana in the State Academic Theater of Opera and Ballet of Ukraine in the name of Taras Shevchenko)

=== 1981 ===
1. Eduard Shorin (project director), Tamara Huselnykova (architect-restaurateur), Viktor Ivanov (engineer-constructor), Leonid Keranchuk (builder), Mykhailo Oziorny (artist), Viktor Semerniov (artist), Yuri Steshyn (artist), Liudmila Khlopinska (scientific consultant), Halyna Cherednychenko (scientific consultant) (museum of shipbuilding and fleet in Mykolaiv)
2. Anatoliy Dimarov (novel-dialogue Pain and Anger)
3. The National Honored Academic Chapel of Ukraine "DUMKA" (concert programs of the last years)
4. Vitaly Korotich (publicist books Cubic capacity of an egg, To see up-close and publicist performance in press media, radio, and television)
5. Stepan Slipets (director), Mykhailo Lushpa (architect), Iryna Petrova (engineer-constructor), Andriy Chornodid (architect) (the Sumy Theater of Drama and Music Comedy in the name of M.Shchepkin)
6. Ada Rogovtseva (performing roles of Ranevska (Chekhov's The Cherry Orchard), Lesia Ukrainka (Shcherbak's To Hope), and Nadia (Harayeva's Hostess) on a stege of the Kyiv State Academic Russian Drama Theater in the name of Lesia Ukrainka)
7. Vladislav Titov (stories In spite all odds, Kovyl, the steppe grass)
8. The Cheksasy State Distinguished Ukrainian People's Chorus (concert programs of the last years)

=== 1982 ===
1. Platon Biletsky (books Ukrainian portrait painting of XVII-XVIII centuries, Ukrainian art in the second half of XVII-XVIII centuries, Ukrainian soviet art)
2. Mykola Mashchenko (director), Serhiy Bondarchuk (performing the role of cardinal Montanelli), Andrei Kharitonov (performing the role of Ovod) (three series of television featured film Ovod (gadfly))
3. Leonid Sandler (architect), Dmytro Sosnovy (architect), Vasyl Vilshuk (sculptor), Vasyl Lukashko (carver), Anton Ovchar (red-tree carpenter), Volodymyr Shevchuk (artist) (creation of the Music and Drama Theater in the name of Ivan Franko using the folklore motives (Ivano-Frankivsk))
4. Viktor Terentyev (director), Andriy Honchar (performing the role of the author and the first secretary of the Party Oblast Committee), Oleksandr Kryvoshein (artistic director), Mykola Myroshnychenko (play author) (play Revival by the book of L.Brezhnev at the Odessa Oblast Russian Drama Theater in the name of A.Ivanov)
5. Viktor Ikonnyk (artistic director and main conductor of the Kyiv Chamber Chorus in the name of B.Liatoshynsky) (popularization of the Liatoshynsky chorus heritage and concert-performing role of the recent years)
6. Anatoliy Moroz (novel Four on a way)
7. Serhiy Shyshko (series of pictures The Kiev Suite)

=== 1983 ===
1. Anatoliy Antonov (architect), Mykhailo Butenko (ground director), Mykola Lutsenko (architect), Oleksandr Moliverov (architect), Anatoliy Pidvezko (architect), Heorhiy Ratushny (architect), (Vasyl Streltsov) (ground director) (building and improvement of the city of Verkhnodniprovsk, Dnipropetrovsk Oblast)
2. Anatoliy Yavorsky (engineer, director of creative collective), Vadym Hlybchenko (technical architect), Iryna Ivanenko (critic), Yevhen Kulikov (sculptor), Lev Novikov (architect), Arkady Khabinsky (engineer), Vitaly Shkliar (architect) (restoration of Mariinskyi Palace in Kyiv)
3. The State Distinguished Capella of bandurists of Ukraine (concert programs of recent years)
4. Mykhailo Reznikovych (director), Viktor Dobrovolsky, Yuri Mazhuha, Anatoliy Pazenko, Anatoliy Reshetnikov, Mykola Rushkovsky, Oleksandra Smoliarova, Lida Yaremchuk (images of Soviet contemporaries in plays Limit of patience, University Department, Theme with variations at the Kyiv State Academic Russian Drama Theater in the name of Lesia Ukrainka)
5. Mykola Kolessa (composer)
6. Hennadiy Kuznetsov (artist-designer), Yevhen Matveyev (grapher), Yuri Novikov (grapher), Mykhailo Shevchenko (grapher) (introduction of new principles in construction, design, and printing performance in works of classics of Marxism-Leninism and prominent figures of the communist and workers' movements (K.Marx Capital, The Civil War in France, And after all it spins!)
7. Borys Oliynyk (collection of poetry Grey Swallow, In the mirror of a word, Duma of a city)
8. Vasyl Svida (high relief In a family of one)
9. Heorhiy Yakutovych (illustrations to books Tale of Bygone Years, The Tale of Igor's Campaign, M.Cheremshyn's Badges. Chichka. Thief is caught., and M.Prihara's Cossack Holota)

=== 1984 ===
1. Leonid Vysheslavsky (collection of poetry Near star)
2. Mykola Vinhranovsky (collection of works for children Summer morning, Summer evening, Swallow by a window, Quite night)
3. E.Fedorov (architect), Makar Vronsky (sculptor), Viktor Sukhenko (sculptor) (monument to T.Shevchenko in the city of Shevchenko, Mangyshlak Oblast (Kazakhstan).
4. Valentyn Shtolko (architect, group leader), Alla Hrachiova (architect), Oleksandr Kabatsky (architect), Ihor Liubenko (architect), Volodymyr Ralchenko (architect), Volodymyr Sloboda (engineer-constructor) (hotel complex Hradetsky in Chernihiv.
5. Vitaly Hubarenko (ballet Rocky host (second edition), opera Remember about me)
6. Andriy Kushnyrenko (artistic director and main conductor of the distinguished Bukovina ensemble of song and dance) (concert programs 1979-1983)
7. Oleksandr Syzonenko (novel-trilogy Steppe, There was autumn, Aim)
8. Natalia Uzhviy (performing roles in plays of recent years on a stage of the Kyiv State Academic Ukrainian Drama Theater in the name of I.Franko)
9. Viktor Shatalin (series of pictures on historically-revolutionary, military-patriotic themes, works of contemporaries)
10. Volodymyr Yavorivsky (story Eternal Kortelis)

=== 1985 ===
1. Valery Barulenkov (civil engineer), Anatoliy Haydamaka (artist), Vadym Hopkalo (architect), Vadym Hrechyna (architect), Volodymyr Kolomiyets (architect), Vitaliy Miahkov (artist), Leonid Filenko (architect) (architecture and artistic design of the Kyiv filial of Central Lenin museum)
2. Yevhen Horban (sculptor) (monument to the heroes of the Horlivka military uprising of 1905 in the city of Horlivka, Donetsk Oblast)
3. Yevhen Hutsalo (story Sayyora and collection of stories Horses flew by)
4. Roman Ivansky (artistic and music director), Volodymyr Didukh, Yevhen Prutkin, Valentyn Reus, Oleksandr Kharchenko (participants of vocal quartet Yavor) (concert programs 1982-1984)
5. Boris Dobrodeyev and Nikolai Shishlin (script writers), Arnoldo Ibañez-Fernandez (film director), Volodymyr Kukorenchuk (cinematographer) (film "Troubled skies of Spain")
6. Roman Ivanychuk (novels Water out of rock, Fourth dimension)
7. Bogodar Kotorovych (violin) (concert programs 1982-1984)
8. Dmytro Popenko (architect, group director), Leonid Los (architect), Iryna Pukhova (engineer-constructor) (complex of the Republican Scientifically Methodical Center of mother and child health protection)
9. Anatoliy Nasedkin (series of picturesque works of kolkhoz installation To kolkhoz, Bred of Revolution, Food Squad (Requisition), Earth)
10. Mykola Rybalko (collection of poetry Non-setting star and new poetry in periodicals)
11. Yuri Rymarenko (book of documentary-publicistic sketches and articles With whom and against whom)
12. Vasyl Fashchenko (literary-critic works In depths of human existence, Characters and situations)
13. Ivan Tsiupa (artistic-documentary book In the heart the voices ring and publicistic performance in press)

=== 1986 ===
1. Nadia Babenko, Hanna Bondarets, Domna Yefremova, Leonid Tovstukha, Mykola Trehubov, Valentyna Trehubova (artist-decorators of carpets and porcelain) (highly artistic use of folk traditions in the works of decor-applied arts)
2. Mykhailo Belikov (director and script writer), Oleksiy Levchenko (artistic director), Vasyl Trushkovsky (camera) (featured films The night is short, How young we were)
3. Klym Dominchen (symphony #4 (Great Patriotic))
4. Volodymyr Zabashtansky (collection of poetry Smell of distance and newly published poetry in periodicals)
5. Oksana Ivanenko (book Always in life)
6. Ivan-Volodymyr Karpliuk (builder), Viktor Marchenko (architect), Ivan Oksentiuk (architect), Yosyp Parubochy (agronomist-landscaper), Vasyl Skuratovsky (architect), Andriy Shuliar (architect) (architecture in the village of Vuzlove, Radekhiv Raion, Lviv Oblast)
7. Raisa Kyrychenko (singer) (concert performance 1983-1985)
8. Valery Kovtun and Tatiana Tayakina (main parties in ballet of P.Chaykovsky Sleeping Beauty, M.Skorulsky Forest song at the State Academic Theater of Opera and Ballet of Ukraine in the name of T.Shevchenko and concert performance of recent years)
9. Valentyn Sperkach (script writer and director), Anton Komarnytsky (script writer), Ihor Sabelnykov (script writer), Yuri Stakhovsky (camera) (documentary films Comandarms of Industry, Predominant Corps, Strategists of Science)
10. Anton Komarnytsky and Ihor Sabeknykov (script writers), Valentyn Sperkach (film director), Yuri Stakhovsky (cinema), Ihor Poklad (composer) (documentaries "Army commanders of industry", "Commanding corps", "Strategy of science")

=== 1987 ===
1. Olha Basystiuk (singer) (concert programs of recent years)
2. Anatoliy Borsiuk (director), Serhiy Diachenko (script writer), Oleksandr Frolov (camera) (educational film Vavilov's Star)
3. Oleksiy Dmytrenko (artistic-documentary story Stork)
4. Oleksiy Dubovy (scientific consultant), Leonid Kondratsky (architect), Mykola Sobchuk (architect), Oleksandra Stetsenko (engineer-constructor), Serhiy Fursenko (architect) (Regional Studies Oblast museum in Cherkasy)
5. Fedir Zakharov (series of landscapes and still lifes Native my Ukraine)
6. Lina Kostenko (historical novel in poetry Marusia Churay and collection of poetry Originality)
7. Myroslav Skoryk (composer)

=== 1988 ===
1. Mykhailo Bernshein, Nadia Vyshnevska, Borys Derkach, Ihor Dzeverin, Oleksiy Zasenko, Oleksiy Mishanych, Fedir Pohrebennyk, Mykhailo Yatsenko (development of scientific principles, organization, and preparation of texts and commentary to collection of works of Ivan Franko in 50 volumes)
2. Volodymyr Dakhno (director), Anatoliy Havrylov (camera), Eduard Kirych (artistic director) (series of "Cossacks" animated films about the Zaporizhian Cossacks)
3. Nina Matviyenko (singer) (concert performance 1985-1987)
4. Ivan Mykolaychuk† (creation of versatile national images in films Dream, Shadows of Forgotten Ancestors, Weed, Commissars, White Bird with Black Mark, Babylon XX, Such late and such warm autumn)
5. Mariia Stefiuk (singer) (performing main parties in operas N.Rimsky-Korsakov Tsar's bride, G.Verdi Rigoletto and Traviata, H.Maiboroda Yaroslav the Wise and concert performance 1985-1987)
6. Mykola Storozhenko (illustrations to the books of M.Kotsiubynsky Fata Morgana and Ivanko and Chuhayster, Panas Myrny Among steppes. Day on a pasture., I.Franko Sonnets, Ukrainian folk tales, Bulgarian folk tales)
7. Valeriy Shevchuk (novel-triptych Three leaves behind the window)

=== 1989 ===
1. Ihor Kobrin (director), Yuri Bordakov (camera), Leonid Muzhuk (script writer), Khem Salhanyk (script writer) (cinema-trilogy Chornobyl: two colors of time)
2. Ivan Honchar (several year long creative and research work of gathering and popularization of folklore)
3. Lesia Dychko (oratorios And giveth it name Kiev (second edition), India Lakshmi, In Kiev dawns)
4. Oleksandr Ivakhnenko (illustration to the works of T.Shevchenko)
5. Anatoliy Kocherha (performance of parties in operas M.Mussorgsky Boris Godunov, G.Verdi Don Carlos, H.Maiboroda Milana)
6. Nila Kriukova (reader) (concert programs 1986-1988)
7. People's Self-performing Chorus capella Dudaryk (artistic director M.Katsal) (concert programs of recent years)
8. Hryhir Tiutiunnyk† (Works in two volumes)

=== 1990 ===
1. Dmytro Bilous (collection of poetry Cranberry Miracle)
2. Borys Voznytsky (several years long work for preservation, research, and popularization of culture heritage)
3. State Kuban Cossack Choir (artistic director V.Zakharchenko) (outstanding work for gathering and research of the Ukrainian folk songs and dances their propaganda in concert performance in our country and abroad)
4. Liubov Ilchenko (artist), Vasyl Kononenko (artist), Leonid Makhnovets (author of translation, foreword, and notes), Volodymyr Yurchyshyn (artist) (preparation and release the edition of Russian Cronicles)
5. Ivan Kozlovsky (singer) (development and enrichment of the Ukrainian music culture and concert performance of recent years)
6. Stepan Pushyk (books Guard-mountain, Halych gate)

=== 1991 ===
1. Ivan Bilyk (historical work Golden Ra)
2. Ivan Dziuba (series of publicist performances For that is not just a language, sounds, articles Ukraine and world, Whether we realize national culture as value)
3. Sergei Parajanov† (director), Larisa Kadochnikova (role performer), Yuri Ilyenko (camera), Heorhiy Yakutovych (artist) (featured film Shadows of Forgotten Ancestors)
4. Rollan Serhiyenko (director), Oleksandr Koval (camera), Volodymyr Kostenko† (script writer), Mykola Shudrya (script writer) (documentary films Open yourself, Taras, Before the icon)
5. Yuliy Meitus (series of romances on verses of the Soviet poets and chorus series on the poetry of A.Tvardovsky)
6. Vasyl Stus† (collection of poetry Road of pain)

=== 1992 ===
1. Borys Antonenko-Davydovych† (collection of poetry Death. Siberian short stories. The overestimated evaluations.)
2. Ivan Bahriany† (novels Garden of Gethsemane, Tiger-hunters)
3. Viktor Hutsal (artistic director of the State Orchestra of the Ukrainian folk instruments) (concert programs 1988-1991)
4. Volodymyr Drozd (epic novel Foliage of the Earth)
5. Mykola Zhulynskyi (book From oblivion - into immortality)
6. T.Shevchenko Bandurist Cappella (United States) (artistic directors H.Kytasty, V.Kolesnyk) (popularization of the Ukrainian musical heritage)
7. Stepan Kolesnyk (publicist story The robbed villages and other works about the fate of the Ukrainian village life)
8. Oleksandr Kostyn (opera-fairy tale Golden-horned deer, ballet Mermaid)
9. Roman Lubkivsky (collection of poetry Sight of eternity)
10. Mykola Maksymenko (series of landscapes Ukraine mine)
11. Taras Melnychuk (collection of poetry Prince of dew)
12. Pavlo Movchan (collection of poetry Continent, Encirclement)
13. Feodosy Rohovy (novel Praznyk ostanioho mlyva)
14. Hryhory Synytsia (revival of the Ukrainian colorful school of monumental painting and works of recent years)
15. O.Koshets Choir (Canada) (artistic director V.Klymkiv) (popularization of the Ukrainian chorus art)

=== 1993 ===
1. Myroslav Vantukh (artistic director of the State Academic ensemble of dance of Ukraine in the name of P.Virsky) (staging dance compositions In peace and agreement, Carpathians, Young years, Ukrainian dance with tambourines)
2. Yarema Hoyan (story Secret of Lesyk's violin)
3. Pavlo Hromovenko (reader) (concert program It is not indifferent to me 1989-1992)
4. Feodosy Humeniuk (series historicaly accurate portraits of P.Sahaydachny, P.Polubotkook, I.Mazepa, Marusia Churay, Bayda Vyshnevetsky, S.Nalyvayko, I.Gonta, M.Zalizniak)
5. Anatoliy Karas (script writer and director), Viktor Shkurin (script writer and director), Viktor Kripchenko (main camera) (documentary cinema-dialogue July Thunder)
6. Lida Kovalenko and Volodymyr Maniak† (people's book-memorial 33rd: famine)
7. Volodymyr Kolomiyets (collection of poems Zolotosyn-Golden-blue)
8. Danylo Lyder (artist-stenographer), Natalia Lototska (performer of main role), Bohdan Stupka (performer of main role) (play Tevye-Tevel of Sholem Aleichem in Kyiv State Academic Ukrainian Drama Theater of Ivan Franko)
9. Hryhoriy Lohvin (monograph Out of depths. Engravings of the Ukrainian old-pressmen of XVI-XVIII centuries. and series of scientific works regarding the Ukrainian art and architecture)
10. Vasyl Lopata (illustrations to Kobzar)
11. Dmytro Mishchenko (collection of works Hunt for Firebird, Personally responsible)
12. Kira Muratova (outstanding contribution to the Ukrainian and World cinema art)
13. Anatoliy Palamarenko (reciter) (concert programs of recent years)
14. Mykola Rudenko (novel Orlov balka, collection Poems)
15. Stepan Sapeliak (collection of poems Long ragged cry)
16. Leonid Talalay (collection of poems Selected)
17. Svitlana Fominykh (artistic director and conductor of a female academic chorus (Mykolaiv)) (concert programs of recent years and propagation of the modern Ukrainian chorus music)
18. Leopold Yashchenko (artistic director of the folkloric-ethnographic chorus Homyn) (active efforts for conservation, revival, and popularization of the Ukrainian National Art)

=== 1994 ===
1. Andriy Antonyuk for series of paintings in last years: "Metropolitan Illarion"", "Feofan Prokopovych", "In the casemate (T.Shevchenko)", "Teacher, who are we?", "Worship of water and earth", "Bohopolska Madonna", "Conversation in the Universe", "A trumpet sound. Caution"
2. Olena Apanovych for the book "Hetmans of Ukraine and Kosh Otamans of Zaporizhian Host"
3. Leonid Bolshakov for documentary trilogy "Years of slavery (Story about Taras)"
4. Yuri Herts for series of paintings "Colorful Verkhovyna"
5. Vasyl Holoborodko for collection of poetry "Icarus on wings of Fabaceae", "Viburnum for Christmas"
6. Viktor Zaretsky† for painting of last years: "Soldieress", "Summer", "Wood (Origins of Art)", "Oi, kum do kumy zalytsyavsya", "Spring troubles"
7. Volodymyr Ivasyuk† for an outstanding contribution in the development of Ukrainian national musical art
8. Robert Conquest for book The Harvest of Sorrow
9. Oleksandr Lupyi for roman "Fall of the ancient capital", novel "Hetman's bulawa"
10. Roman Rakhmanny for the three volume collection "Ukraine of the nuclear age"
11. Nadia Svitlychna for an active journalist and publishing activities of last years
12. Ivan Svitlychnyi† for a collection of poetry, poetic translations, and literary-critical articles "Heart for bullets and rhymes"
13. Ivan Chendei for book "Viburnum under snow", novel "Ivan"

=== 1995 ===
1. Leonid Andriyevsky for album "Ukrainian folk art of the 13th-20th centuries"
2. Mykola Bednyak (Canada) for series of historical paintings and portraits: "Prince Danylo of Halych", "Hetman Ivan Mazepa", "Dovbush", "Battle neat Kruty", a cycle of iconic compositions
3. State Capella of Ukraine "Trembita" (artistic director and chief conductor M.Kulyk) for the concert programs of 1992-94
4. Ivan-Valentyn Zadorozhny† for series of works 1964-88
5. Opanas Zalyvakha for the compositions of last years: "20th century", "Peace-carriers", "Ukrainian Madonna", "Portrait of Vasyl Stus", "Portrait of Shevchenko", "Cossack is carried", "The beginning"
6. Vasyl Zakharchenko for roman "Profitable people"
7. Hryhorii Kochur for a book of translations "Second echo"
8. Yevhen Sverstiuk for book "Prodigal sons of Ukraine"
9. Vasyl Symonenko† for a collection of poetry and prose "Swans of motherhood", "I live in your name", "My people will always be"
10. Valentyn Sylvestrov for the Symphony No.5, String quartet No.1, cantata to words by Shevchenko for chorus and Capella
11. Roman Fedoriv for roman "Jerusalem on the hills"
12. Mykola Shopsha for performance of Ivan Karas opera roles ("Zapozhets za Dunayem" of S.Hulak-Artemovsky), Zakhar Berkut ("Golden hoop" of B.Lyatoshynsky), Boris Godunov ("Boris Godunov" of M.Mussorgsky), and other concert programs of 1992-94

=== 1996 ===
1. Vira Ageyeva, Vitaliy Donchyk, Yuri Kovaliv, Andriy Kravchenko, Volodymyr A. Melnyk, Volodymyr Morenets, Mykhailo Nayenko, Hryhoriy Shton for a textbook "History of Ukrainian literature of 20th century" in two books
2. Volodymyr Bazilevsky for collection of poetry "Vertep"
3. Oleh Biyma (film director), Oleksiy Bohdanovych (actor), Volodymyr Hronsky (composer), Zinaida Dehtyaryova (actress), Oleksiy Zotsenko (camera), Olha Sumska (actress), Anatoliy Khostikoyev (actor) for series of featured films for television "Trap", "Crime with many unknowns"
4. Virko Baley (United States), a conductor and composer, for outstanding contribution in development of Ukrainian Music Art and its propaganda in the world
5. Iryna Zhylenko for collection of poetry "Party in the old vinarne"
6. Valentyn Znoba for creation of sculpture compositions on the theme of the Great Patriotic War (monuments of Glory in Kherson, Khmelnytskyi, at Bukrin platzdarm, a monument in Brovary)
7. Raisa Ivanchenko for tetralogy about the Kyivan Rus: "Treason or how to become a master", "Wreath of Perun", "Golden Stirrups", "Poison for the princess"
8. Viktor Minyailo for roman "Eternal Ivan"
9. Danylo Narbut for series of portraits "Hetmans of Ukraine" and paintings "Election of Kosh Otaman", "Doom", "Protection of the Virgin"
10. Taras Petrynenko for remarkable achievement in development of a modern Ukrainian pop song, concert-performing activity of last years
11. Viacheslav Chornovil for collections "Justice or recurrence of terror", "Woe from Wit", a book "Chrnicles of camp days", journalistic works in newspapers and magazines of Ukraine and worlds
12. Bohdan-Yuri Yanivsky for cycle of musical compositions in a big form for children: opera "The frog princess", musicale "Mykyta the Fox", "Ring of temptation", "Tom Soyer"
13. Nazariy Yaremchuk†, singer, for concert work 1973-95

=== 1997 ===
1. Ivan Marchuk, for series of paintings "Shevchenkiana", "Voice of my soul"
2. Liudmyla Semykina, "High Castle"
3. Petro Skunts, for collection of poetry "Ask yourself"
4. Anatoliy Solovianenko, for concert programs 1993-96
5. Oleksandr Ulianenko, for novel "Stalinka"

=== 1998 ===
1. Roman Andriyashyk, for novel "Storonets"
2. Mykhailo Didyk, for performing of the main party of the Duke in opera "Rigoletto" G.Verdi (National Opera of Ukraine)
3. Olha Nahorna, for performing of the main party of Gilda in opera "Rigoletto" G.Verdi (National Opera of Ukraine)
4. Mykola Dremlyuha, for symphony #3 "To the memory of the Holodomor victims of 1932-33 in Ukraine"
5. Ivan Lytovchenko†, for tapestry-triptych "Origins of Slavic writing" (passed to Maria Lytovchenko)
6. Volodymyr Pasivenko, Volodymyr Pryadka, for monumental-decorative panneau "Pain of earth" for the Vernadsky National Library of Ukraine
7. Yevhen Savchuk, artistic director and main conductor of the National Academic Capella of Ukraine "DUMKA", for concert programs of the Ukrainian choir music 1992-97
8. Tetyana Yablonska, for series of scenic works 1993-97

=== 1999 ===
1. Ivan Bilyk, Mykhailo Kitrysh, Vasyl Omelyanenko, for series of works with Oposhnya ceramics
2. Valeriy Buimister (singer), for concert programs 1993-1998: "Shevchenkiana", "Ukrainian composers of present", "Italian music", "German music"
3. Hanna Havrylets (composer), for the musical stage show "Gold stone will sow"
4. Dmytro Kremin, for collection of poetry "Pectoral"
5. Bohdan Mazur (sculptor), for the monument to Sergei Paradjanov in Kyiv and "Angel of grief" in Khmelnytsky
6. Mykola Merzlykin (film director), Ihor Shcherbakov (composer), for play "Trap for a witch" in Kyiv State Music Theater for children and youth
7. Dmytro Nalyvaiko, for book "With eyes of the West. Reception of Ukraine in Western Europe in 11th-18th centuries"
8. Volodymyr Patyk, for series of works "Land of Shevchenko" and works of recent years

=== 2000 ===
1. Ivan Hnatyuk, for book "Stezhky-dorozhky"
2. Vilen Kalyuta† (cameraman), for camera works of recent years
3. Alemdar Karamanov, for concert #2 for piano with orchestra "Ave Maria" and symphony #23 "Az Iisus"
4. Borys Necherda†, for collection of poetry "The last book"
5. Marfa Tymchenko, for series of works of folk decorative scenic painting
6. Volodymyr Chepelyk (sculptor), for the monument to Mykhailo Hrushevsky in Kyiv
7. Anatoliy Shekera (choreograph), for ballet plays of recent years
8. Andriy Shkurhan (singer), for concert programs 1995-99

=== 2001 ===
1. Volodymyr Hryshko, for vocal parties in opera plays
2. Roman Maiboroda, for vocal parties in opera plays
3. Yevhen Pashkovsky, for novel "Daily baton"
4. Myroslav Popovych, for book "Outline of the history of Ukraine culture"

=== 2002 ===
1. Serhiy Bilokin, for scientific-nonfiction book "Mass terror as the way of state administration in USSR"
2. Andriy Bokotei, for dimensional compositions out of glass
3. Arkadiy Mikulsky (film director), Leonid Cherevatenko (screenwriter), for documentary movie trilogy "I am a stone from a sling of God"
4. Ihor Rymaruk, for book of poetry "Maiden Resentment"

=== 2003 ===
1. Vasyl Herasymyuk, for book of poetry "Poet in air"
2. Maria Levytska (painter-scenographer), for scenographic works of recent years
3. Vyacheslav Medved, for novel "Blood in the straw"
4. Vyacheslav Palkin (conductor), for concert programs 1998-2002

=== 2004 ===
1. Yuri Barabash, for the monograph "If I forget you, Jerusalem... Gogol and Shevchenko"
2. Serhiy Bukovsky (movie director), for the documentary TV-series "War. Ukrainian account"
3. Vasyl Slapchuk, for books of poetry "Against the stream of grass", "Branch on the walking stick of wanderer"
4. Lyudmyla Yurchenko, for a vocal performance in opera spectacles
5. Serhiy Yakutovych, for a cycle of graphical artistry in last years

=== 2005 ===
1. Aziz Abdullayev (author arrangement), Aider Aliyev (sculpture artist), Ibrahim-Girei Nagayev (chief architect), Zarema Nagayeva (architect), Fefza Yakubov (concept author), for sculpture-complex "Renaissance" (Simferopol)
2. Mykola Vorobiov, for the book of poetry "Servant of Pionium"
3. Viktor Kaminsky, for the concert #2 "Christmas", the symphony-cantanta "Ukraine. The Crusade.", the operettas "Going, calling, begging" and "Akathist to the Blessed Virgin Mary"
4. Mykhailyna Kotsiubynska, for the book "My horizons" 2 volumes
5. Serhiy Krymsky, for the books "Philosophy as the way of humanity and hope" and "Requests of philosophical senses"
6. Yuri Lanyuk, for the musical creations "Palimpsests" and "Music from the Book of Secret Spaces, and Elegy for Bird of Radiance"
7. Maria Matios, for the novel "Sweet Darusya"
8. Volodymyr Mykyta, for series of works "Native Land"
9. Mykhailo Slaboshpytsky, for the autobiographical novel "Poet out of hell"

=== 2006 ===
1. Yevhen Beznysok, for series of illustrations to the works of Ivan Franko
2. Hryhoriy Huseinov, for the artistic documentary life story in 9 volumes "Lord's seed"
3. Ihor Kachurovsky, for the book "Radiant silvetkas"
4. Anatoli Kychynsky, for the books of poetry "Flying over November" and "Dance of Fire"
5. Volodymyr Kuchynsky (play director), Oleh Stefanov, Nataliya Polovynka, Andriy Vodychev (role performers), for plays by the works of Plato, Hryhoriy Skovoroda, Vasyl Stus in the Lviv Academic Youth Theater of Les Kurbas
6. Valeri Matyukhin (artistic director and main conductor of the National vocalist ensemble "Kievan Camerata"), for the musical-artistic project "Music from the Ancient Times to the Modern"
7. Volodymyr Nedyak, for the illustrated history of the Ukrainian Cossacks "Ukraine, the Cossack State"
8. Vasyl Nechepa (kobzar), for concert program "In the rumble and lament of banduras"
9. Anatoliy Pogrebnoy, for the publicistic trilogy "In the vicious circle of ages", "If we are, then where?", "Call of the strong rank"
10. Zoya Chehusova, for the album-catalog "Decorative Arts of Ukraine at the end of the 20th century. 200 names"

=== 2007 ===
1. Mykola Hobdych (artistic director of the Academic Chamber Choir "Kyiv"), for the artistic program "Thousand years of the Ukrainian spiritual music"
2. Eustachy Lapski (Poland), for the books of poetry "Looking for oneself" and "On the both sides of the truth"
3. Mykhaylo Melnyk (director and actor), for the play "The sin" in the Dnipropetrovsk Ukrainian Theater of One Actor "Kryk"
4. Ivan Ostafiychuk, for the cycles of artistic works "My Ukraine", "Journey to Baturyn", "Boykos' saga"
5. Borys Plaksiy, for the cycles of picturesque works "Creators of Independence", "The agony of evil"
6. Dmytro Stus, for the book "Vasyl Stus: life as art"
7. Raymond Turkoniak (USA), for the translation of the Ostroh Bible into the modern Ukrainian language
8. Taras Fedyuk, for the book of poetry "Faces of desert"
9. Andriy Chebykin, for the cycle of artistic works "Crimean motives", "Female images", "Withered foliage"

=== 2008 ===
1. Lyubov Holota, for the novel "Episodic memory"
2. Alexander Dzekun (Russia, play director), Volodymyr Petriv (role performer), for the play "Berestechko" of the Rivne Academic Musical-Drama Theater
3. Hennadiy Lyashenko, for the cantantas "The mystery of silence" and "Stained glass and sceneries" for choir and capella on the poetry of Taras Shevchenko and Bohdan-Ihor Antonych
4. Vitali Malakhov (play director), Bohdan Benyuk, Nataliya Sumska (role performers), for the play "Of mice and people" of theatrical company Benyuk and Khostikoyev
5. Petro Perebyinis, for the collection of poetry "The wheat clocks"
6. Vira Selyanska (Brazil), for the books "The Seventh Seal", "The Romen-herb" and translation of works of the Ukrainian literature into the Portuguese language
7. Vasyl Sydak, for the series of wooden sculptures
8. Mykhailo Tkachuk (movie director), for the documentary series "The mystery of the Norilsk Uprising"
9. Valeri Franchuk, for the cycle of picturesque works "The swung of bells of the memory", commemorated to the victims of Holodomor
10. Volodymyr Yakymets, Yaroslav Nudyk, Bohdan Bohach, Andriy Kapral, Andriy Shavalya, Roman Turyanyn (performers of the vocal group "Picardian trio"), for the concert programs (2003-2006)

=== 2009 ===
1. Pavlo Hirnyk, for the book of poetry "The dawn"
2. Viktor Hontarov, for series of canvases "My Gogol" and cycle of picturesque works
3. Larysa Kadyrova, for gallery of female images in mono-plays and contribution in development of the Ukrainian theatrical arts
4. Volodymyr Melnychenko, for the document-publicist books "Taras Shevchenko. My stay in Moscow.", "In honor of our exalted Ukraine (Taras Shevchenko and Osip Bodyansky)"
5. Viktor Nakonechnyi, for series of paintings "My shiny land"

== 2010-20s ==
=== 2010 ===
1. Mykhailo Andrusyak (publicist), for the documental-artistic trilogy "Brothers of thunder", "Brothers of fire", and "Brothers of spaces"
2. Mykola Babak (director of project and artistic arrangement), Oleksandr Naidyon (script author), for the monograph "National icon of the Mid-Dnieper region in the 18-20th centuries in context of peasant cultural field"
3. Stepan Hanzha (master of folk artistry), for the artistic series of carpets
4. Dmytro Ivanov (poet), for the book of poetry "Village in a torn wreath"
5. Viktor Kovtun (artist), for the cycle of picturesque works "My land - Sloboda Ukraine"
6. Bohdan Kozak (performer), for the concert performance of poetic compositions "The Gospel of Taras" and "Thoughts" based on the works of Taras Shevchenko
7. Levko Kolodub (composer), for the symphony #9 "Sensilis moderno" ("Newest impressions"), the symphony #10 "Based on sketches of the young age", the symphony #11 "New banks"
8. Kost Lavro (artist), for illustrations to the works of classics of Patriotic literature and monumental paintings the themes of the Ukrainian folk tales in the Kyiv State Academic Puppet Theater
9. Halyna Pahutiak (writer), for the book of prose "Servant out of Dobromyl"
10. Oksana Pakhlyovska (writer), for the book of journalism "Ave, Europa!"

=== 2011 ===
1. Roman Horak, Mykola-Yaroslav Hnativ (literary critics), for the book "Ivan Franko"
2. Mykola Dedyura (musical director and conductor), Anatoli Solovianenko (stage director), Serhiy Mahera (singer) (party performance of Orovezo), Svitlana Kramareva (party performance of Norma), for the opera play "Norma" of Vincenzo Bellini in the National Academic Theater of Opera and Ballet of Ukraine of Taras Shevchenko
3. Lydia Zabylyasta (singer), for party performance of Ingigerd, Turandot, and Amelia the opera plays "Yaroslav the Wise" of Heorhiy Maiboroda, "Turandot" of Giacomo Puccini, and "Un ballo in maschera" of Giuseppe Verdi on the stage of the National Opera of Ukraine and the concert programs of the Ukrainian folk songs and romances
4. Vasyl Shkliar (writer), for the historical novel Chornyi voron ("Black Raven") (first refused, but later accepted)

=== 2012 ===
1. Petro Midyanka (poet), for the collection of poetry "Luitro into sky" (2010)
2. Volodymyr Rutkivskyi (prose writer), for the historical trilogy for children "Djury" (2007–10) ("Djury of Cossack Shvaika", "Djury the Characters", "Djury and the submarine")
3. Tetyana Kara-Vasylieva (art critic), for the book "History of the Ukrainian embroidery" (2008)
4. Viktor Stepurko (composer), for the psalm-melody "Monologues of ages" for a mixed choir and solo instruments (in seven parts by canonical texts)
5. Anatoliy Kryvolap (artist), for the cycle out of 50 works "The Ukrainian motif"

=== 2013 ===
1. Dmytro Bohomazov (theatre director) for the plays "Hamlet" by W. Shakespeare of the Odessa Academic Ukrainian Music and Drama Theater, "Guests will come at midnight" by A. Miller of the Kyiv Academic Drama and Comedy Theater on the left bank of the Dnieper and "Shchurolov" by O. Green of the Kyiv Theater "Free Stage»
2. Leonid Kovaloenko (poet) for the book of poems "The Sign of the Broken Yoke"
3. Petro Pechorny (artist) for a series of ceramic plates based on the works of Taras Shevchenko

=== 2014 ===
1. Liudmyla Monastyrska (spinto soprano)
2. Liubomyr Medvid (painter)
3. Myroslav Dochynets (writer)
4. Iryna Haiuk (cultural researcher)
5. Vasyl Vasylenko (conductor)
6. Maria Kurochka

=== 2015 ===
1. Petro Panchuk (actor)
2. Kostiantyn Moskalets (writer)
3. Mykola Kompanets (artist)
4. Yuri Buriak (poet)

=== 2016 ===
1. Levko Lukianenko (politician)
2. Mychailo Huida (painter)
3. Radu Poklitaru (choreographer-director)
4. Oleh Sentsov (filmmaker)
5. Anzhelina Shvachka (mezzo-soprano singer)

=== 2017 ===
1. Ivan Malkovych (poet and publisher)
2. Mykola Malyshko (artist)
3. Bohdana Frolyak (composer)
4. Stepan Koval (film director) for his work on the animated series "My Country Is Ukraine."

=== 2018 ===
1. Emma Andijewska (artist and writer)
2. Pavlo Makov (painter)
3. Serhii Plokhy (historian)
4. Victoria Poleva (composer)
5. Volodymyr Tykhyi (film director)

=== 2019 ===
1. Roman Bondachuk (director)
2. Bohdan Horyn (human rights activist)
3. Rostyslav Derzhypilsky (theater director and actor)
4. Oksana Zabuzhko (writer)
5. Vasyl Chebanyk (paineter)
6. Volodymyr Sheiko (conductor)

=== 2020 ===
1. Marianna Kiyanovska (writer)
2. Taras Prokhasko (writer)
3. Evgenia Podobna (journalist)
4. DakhaBrakha (music quartet)
5. Vladislav Troitsky (theater director)
6. Oleksandr Hliadielov (photographer)

=== 2021 ===
1. Oksana Lutsyshyna (writer)
2. Stanislav Aseyev (writer and human rights activist)
3. Valentyn Vasyanovych (film director)
4. Boris Mikhailov (photographer)
5. Evgen Shymalsky (activist)
6. Kateryna Sula (activist)
7. Oleksandr Behma (actor)

=== 2022 ===
1. Kateryna Gornostai (film director)
2. George Grabowicz (literary critic)
3. Tamara Duda (writer)
4. Nikita Kadan (artist)
5. Mykola Riabchuk (political analyst and writer)
6. Tiberiy Szilvashi (artist)
7. Tamara Trunova (theater director)
8. Natalya Vorozhbyt (playwright and screenwriter)

=== 2023 ===
1. Kateryna Kalytko (poet)
2. Vitaly Portnikov (journalist)
3. Mykhailo Nazarenko (literary critic)
4. Taras Kompanichenko (kobzar)
5. Iryna Tsilyk (filmmaker and writer)

=== 2024 ===
1. Jamala (singer)
2. Andriy Yermolenko (artist)
3. Dmytro Lazutkin (poet)
4. Evgeniy Maloletka (journalist and photographer)
5. Mstyslav Chernov (filmmaker and war correspondent)
6. Vasilisa Stepanenko (journalist and video producer)
7. Karmella Tsepkolenko (composer)
8. Yaryna Chornohuz (poet and corporal )
9. Ivan Urywvky (theater director)
10. Tetiana Ovsiichuk (art director)
11. Susanna Karpenko (choirmaster)

=== 2025 ===
1. Vasyl Vovkun (director)
2. Yuriy Izdryk (poet)
3. Zhanna Kadyrova (artist)
4. Pavlo Kazarin (journalist)
5. Valentyna karpets-Yermolayeva (folk artist)
6. Andriy Pikush (folk artist)
7. Mariya Pikush (folk artist)
8. Nataliya Rybak (folk artist)
9. Bohdana Pivnenko (violinist)
10. Oles Sanin (director)
11. Serhiy Mykhalchuk (camera operator)
12. Alla Zahaikevych (composer)
13. Oleksandr Shymko (composer)

=== 2026 ===
1. Olesia Avramenko (art critic)
2. Pavlo Belianskyi (writer)
3. Nazar Bilyk (sculptor)
4. Tetiana Hauk (curator)
5. Olena Hrozovska (curator)
6. Mykhailo Kulivnyk (curator)
7. Kateryna Lisova (curator)
8. Darya Podoltseva (designer)
9. Olena Hrom (photographer)
10. Oksana Dmitriieva (director)
11. Oleh Kryshtopa (journalist)
12. Ihor Matsiyevskyi (glassmaker)
13. Pavlo Ostrikov (director, scriptwriter)
14. Valeriy Sakharuk (curator)
15. Yuliya Tkach (conductor)
16. Serhiy Trymbach (cinema critic)
17. Yuriy Shcherbak (writer)

== See also ==
- List of Ukrainian State Prizes
