= Holota =

Holota is a surname. Notable people with the surname include:

- Johnny Holota (1921–1951), Canadian ice hockey player
- Lyubov Holota (born 1949), Ukrainian author
- Petr Holota (born 1965), Czech footballer
- Tomasz Hołota (born 1991), Polish footballer
