= Andreas Bolek =

Austrian Nazi Party politician

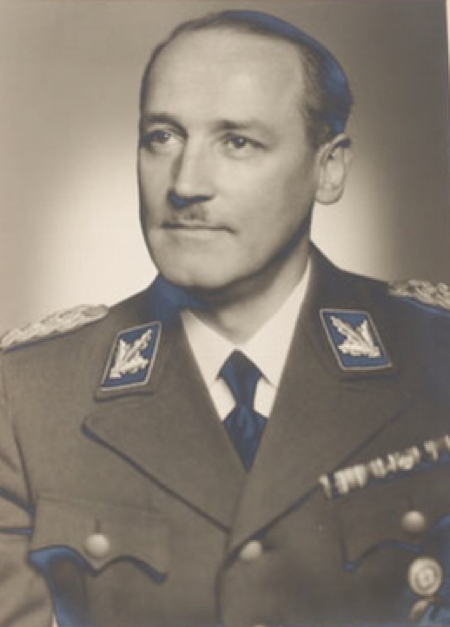
- Bolek in 1937

Police President of Magdeburg
- In office 7 November 1938 – 5 May 1945

Gauleiter of Upper Austria
- In office June 1927 – 25 July 1934
- Preceded by: Alfred Proksch

Deputy Gauleiter of Upper Austria
- In office 29 August 1926 – June 1927
- Preceded by: Position established

Additional positions
- 1934–1945: Honorary Gauleiter
- 1936–1945: Reichstag Deputy

Personal details
- Born: 3 May 1894 Weinbergen, Upper Austria, Austria-Hungary
- Died: 5 May 1945 (aged 51) Magdeburg, Prussia, Nazi Germany
- Cause of death: Suicide by gunshot
- Citizenship: Austrian, German (from 1935)
- Party: Nazi Party
- Other political affiliations: Deutsche Nationalsozialistische Arbeiterpartei, (DNSAP)
- Occupation: Businessman
- Civilian awards: Golden Party Badge

Military service
- Allegiance: Austria-Hungary; Nazi Germany
- Branch/service: Austro-Hungarian Army; Schutzstaffel
- Years of service: 1914-1918; 1937-1945
- Rank: Leutnant; Brigadeführer
- Unit: 30th Infantry Regiment
- Battles/wars: World War I World War II
- Military awards: War Merit Cross

Andreas Bolek (3 May 1894 – 5 May 1945) was an Austrian Nazi who served as the Gauleiter of Upper Austria from 1927 to 1934. He emigrated to Nazi Germany where he became a Reichstag deputy, the Police President of Magdeburg and an SS-Brigadeführer. At the end of the Second World War, he committed suicide when Allied forces entered Magdeburg.

== Early life ==
The son of a teacher, Bolek was born at Weinbergen (today, Vynnyky) in Austria-Hungary and attended the Volksschule and the Progymnasium in Lemberg (today, Lviv). He then attended a commercial academy to study business. In 1914, he volunteered for military service in the Austro-Hungarian Army with the 30th Infantry Regiment. He fought in the First World War on the Italian front, at the Battles of the Isonzo, and the Battle of the Piave River. Promoted to Leutnant, he was decorated for bravery. After the end of the war, he returned to Linz in 1919, where he married and later had four daughters. From 1923 to June 1933, he was employed at the Linz Electricity and Tram Company (ESG), where he became the general personnel manager and sat on the administrative board.

== Political career in Austria ==
Also in 1923, Bolek joined the Austrian Nazi Party (Deutsche Nationalsozialistische Arbeiterpartei, DNSAP) and, as a former front-line officer, he became the leader of the Nazi paramilitary unit, the SA, in Linz and took command of the SA for all of Lower Austria by July of that year. After the majority of the Austrian Nazis accepted the leadership of Adolf Hitler, Alfred Proksch was named Gauleiter of Lower Austria on 29 August 1926. Bolek succeeded him as Party leader in Linz and also was named Deputy Gauleiter. Bolek formally joined the German Nazi Party on 5 October 1926 (membership number 50,648). As an early Party member, he would later be awarded the Golden Party Badge. From May 1927, he also served on the Linz city council. When Proksch advanced to the post of Deputy Landesleiter of Austria in June 1927, Bolek was promoted to Gauleiter in Upper Austria. He also became the editor of the Party newspaper Der Volksstimmer (The People's Voice). Following the resignation of Proksch from the Linz city council on 9 January 1932, Bolek succeeded him as chairman of the Nazi faction. However, on 19 June 1933, in response to increased incidents of Nazi-sponsored violence, Austrian Chancellor Engelbert Dollfuß outlawed the Party and Bolek fled across the German border to Passau.

== Career in Nazi Germany ==
Bolek continued his Party activities in Passau and also in Munich where he was assigned to the Nazi Party's department that managed the Austrian Landesleitung (state leadership). He was involved in orchestrating cross-border violence and, as a result, the Austrian government revoked his citizenship in August 1933. After the failed July Putsch against the Dollfuß government in 1934, the Party in Austria was driven further underground, and its Gau organizations were effectively dismantled as Hitler began a policy of more outward accommodation with Austria. Bolek effectively was removed as Gauleiter of Upper Austria on 25 July. However, he was granted the title of Honorary Gauleiter. He also became a naturalized German citizen on 1 August 1935. On 29 March 1936, Bolek was elected as a Reichstag deputy for electoral constituency 3 (Berlin-East). He remained a Reichstag deputy until his death, switching to constituency 33 (Hesse-Darmstadt) at the April 1938 election.

On 9 November 1937, Bolek joined the SS (SS number 289,210) with the rank of SS-Brigadeführer and was assigned to the staff of the Reichsführer-SS Heinrich Himmler. On 1 December 1937, he was made the administrator of the Magdeburg police department and was named Police President on 7 November 1938. On 5 December 1938, his SS posting was changed to the SD Main Office, the Nazi Party intelligence service that became part of the Reich Security Main Office run by SS-Obergruppenführer Reinhard Heydrich. On 24 January 1939, Bolek was appointed as an honorary judge at the People's Court for a term of five years. He was granted the additional title of Generalmajor of police on 8 February 1944, and also was awarded the War Merit Cross that year.

Bolek remained at his post in Magdeburg throughout the Second World War. In mid-April 1945, the U.S. 9th Army assaulted Magdeburg from the western bank of the Elbe River, and Bolek led his police forces (Polizeiregiment Bolek) in the final defense of the city. By 5 May 1945, the Red Army forces marched into Magdeburg from the eastern bank of the Elbe, whereupon Bolek shot himself rather than surrender.

== Sources ==
- "Andreas Bolek (1894–1945)" (PDF).
- Höffkes, Karl (1986). Hitlers Politische Generale. Die Gauleiter des Dritten Reiches: ein biographisches Nachschlagewerk. Tübingen: Grabert-Verlag. ISBN 3-87847-163-7.
- Pauley, Bruce F. (1981). Hitler and the Forgotten Nazis: A History of Austrian National Socialism. The University of North Carolina Press. ISBN 978-0-807-84182-2.
- Schiffer Publishing Ltd., ed. (2000). SS Officers List: SS-Standartenführer to SS-Oberstgruppenführer (As of 30 January 1942). Schiffer Military History Publishing. ISBN 0-7643-1061-5.
