= Mykola Babak =

Ukrainian artist, writer, publisher, and art collector

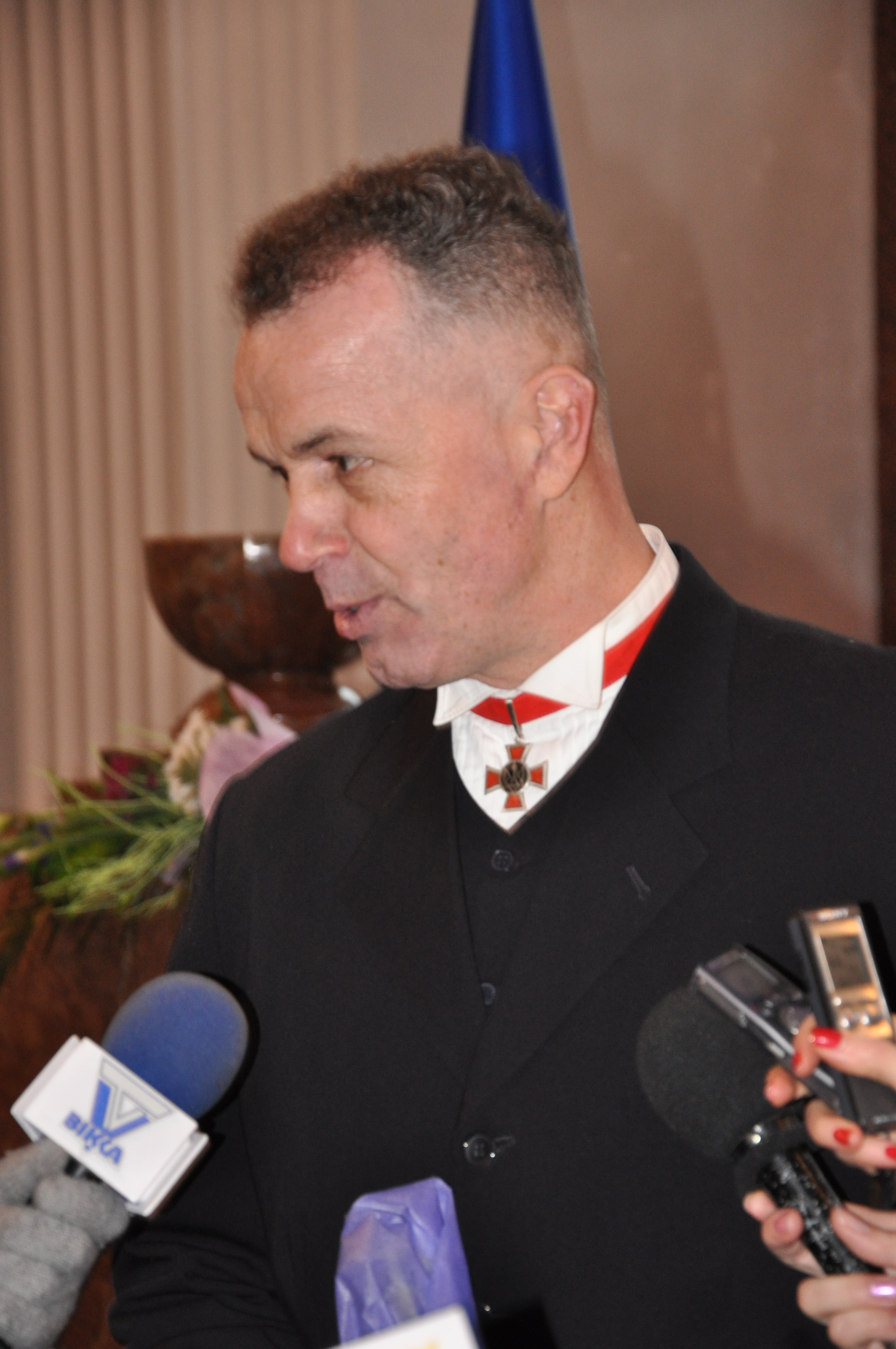
- Born: Mykola Babak; 10 June 1954 (age 71); Cherkasy Oblast (Ukraine)
- Known for: art, painting, writing, art collecting, publishing
- Movement: transavantgarde, hyperreality, neo-expressionism, assemblage
- Awards: Shevchenko National Prize; Merited Artist of Ukraine; People's Artist of Ukraine
- Website: Facebook

Mykola Panteleimonovych Babak (Ukrainian: Микола Пантелеймонович Бабак; 10 June 1954) is a Ukrainian artist, writer, publisher, and art collector; participant of the Ukrainian New Wave; lives and works in Cherkasy.

== Biography ==
Mykola Babak was born in Voronyntsi, Cherkasy Oblast. In 1971 he finished Melnyky Secondary School. From 1972 till 1972 he served in the Soviet Army. After demobilization he worked as a designer at Cherkasy "Azot" Company and at Cherkasy Combine of art-advertisement. From 1979 till 1985 together with a group of other artists he managed monumental projects (paintings, mosaics, stained-glass windows) in the far-east of Russia. In 1986 Mykola Babak came back to Ukraine.

Babak is the member of National Union of Artists of Ukraine (from 1990), Merited Artist of Ukraine (2004), Shevchenko National Prize Laureate (2010), People's Artist of Ukraine (2016). His works are at the National Art Museum of Ukraine, Ministry of Culture and Tourism of Ukraine, private collections. Babak lives and works in Cherkasy. Since 2014 he has been working with Evgene Matveev in the BM Babak-Matveev art tandem. In 2017, Mykola Babak organized and headed the charitable foundation of the same name to implement more effective activities to preserve the Ukrainian cultural heritage and support contemporary art (Mykola Babak Foundation Site)..

== Publishing ==
In the 90's M. Babak became one of the founders of the publishing house "Rodovid" and the magazine of the same name, published an anthology of poets of Cherkasy region "Toloka", where he published a series of his poems, organized a literary group and "Age of Fogs", published his own novels "Alder Blood" and "Demons of Eden".

In 2009, on his initiative, together with the Institute of Art History, Folklore and Ethnology of the National Academy of Sciences of Ukraine, a monograph "People's Icon of the Middle Dnieper 18-20 c. in the context of the peasant cultural space", was published, which received a number of the most prestigious awards. It became the best book of the 16th Publishers' Forum in Lviv. He received a diploma named after Ivan Fedorov at the Art of the Book competition. The jury of the XI All-Ukrainian rating "Book of the Year 2009" recognized the monograph as the best and awarded it first place in the nomination "Business Card", as well as the Grand Prix as the main winner. In 2010, the publication and its authors, M. Babak and O. Naiden, became winners of the Shevchenko National Prize of Ukraine.

In 2014, on the initiative of M. Babak and with the participation of the Institute of Art History, Folklore and Ethnology of the National Academy of Sciences of Ukraine, a monograph "Rural photography of the Middle Dnieper region of the late 19th-20th centuries" was created. It is the first art, philosophical, cultural and historical-ethnographic study of the culture of the peasants of the Middle Dnieper region on the basis of more than 5,000 photographs. Village photographers documented various aspects of peasant life, folk traditions, material and spiritual culture in the context of political transformations and the onset of urban and bourgeois culture. The jury of the XVI All-Ukrainian rating "Book of the Year 2014" recognized the monograph as the best and awarded it first place in the nomination "Business Card".

== Art ==
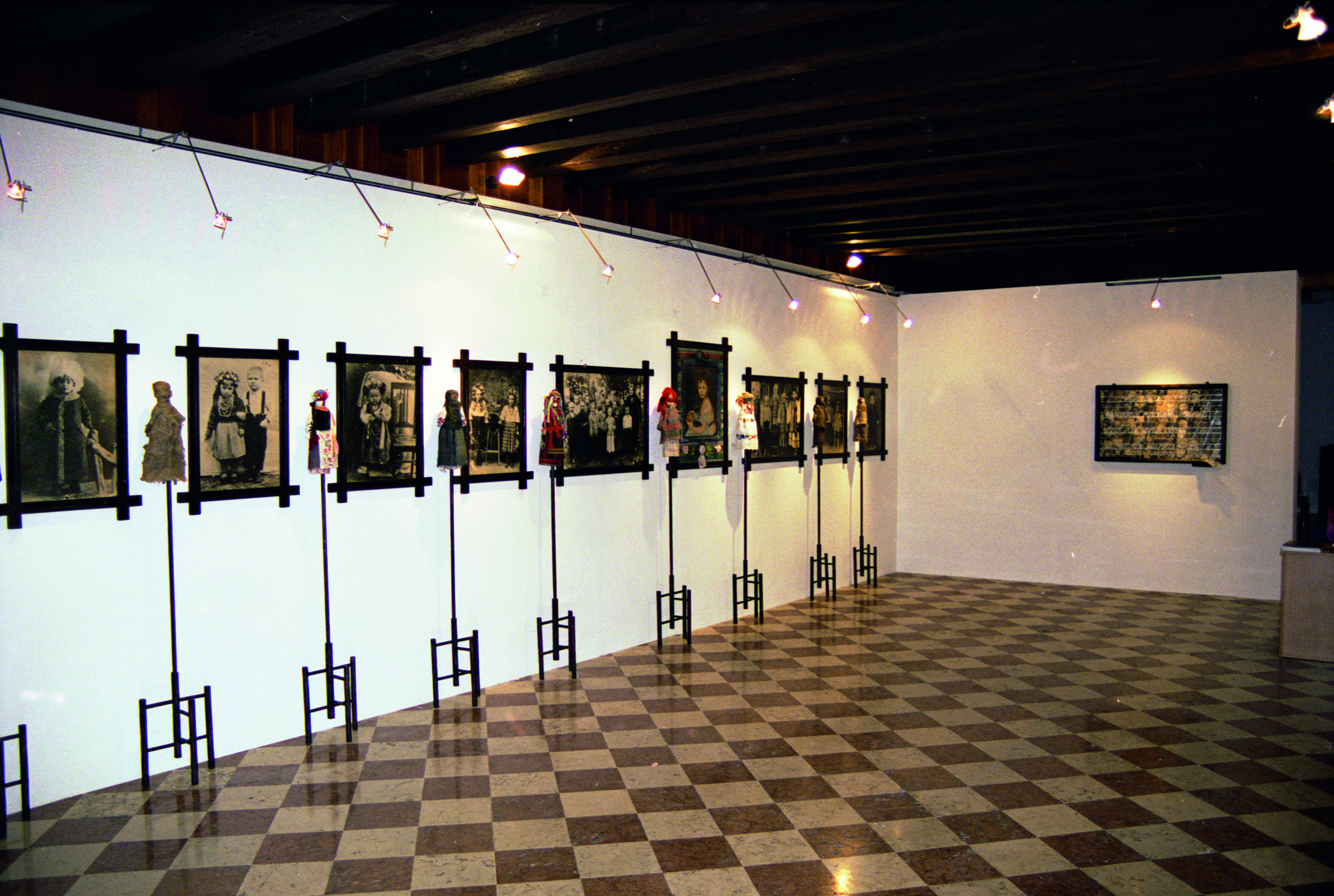
Mykola Babak's "Your children, Ukraine", national Ukrainian project at the 51st Venice Biennale (2005)

Babak's artistic works are made in the techniques of hyperreality, neo-expressionism, transavantgarde, assemblage. The artist adheres to the stylistic principles of post-avantgarde. He is known for his national project "Your children, Ukraine" at the 51st Venice Biennale (2005). Since 2014 Mykola Babak has been working with Evgene Matveev under the name Art-tandem BM Babak-Matveev.

== Selected exhibitions ==
- 2021 "13 rooms COVID" Project (within the art tandem BM Babak-Matveev), Museum of Contemporary Art Korsakov, Lutsk
- 2021 "Intermission", 17th International Exhibition of Contemporary Art (within the art tandem BM Babak-Matveev), Cherkasy Art Museum
- 2020 "Dialogues", 10th International Exhibition of Contemporary Art (within the art tandem BM Babak-Matveev), Cherkasy Art Museum
- 2020 "Art in the Time of Plague", Virtual Exhibition
- 2018 "Revelations", Alexandre Gertsman Contemporary Art Gallery, New York
- 2017 "The Multidimensional Context of Art Beyond Post-Soviet Borders", Alexandre Gertsman Contemporary Art Gallery, New-York
- 2016 "Hryhoriy Shevchenko. Types and views of Ukraine, photos and postcards of the late XIX - early XX centuries." (from Mykola Babak's private collection), Taras Shevchenko Museum, Kaniv
- 2015 “The Central Dnipro River Region Folk Icon of the 18th – 20th c.(from Mykola Babak’s private collection)”, Art Museum, Cherkasy
- 2013 “IV Fine Art Ukraine”, Art-Arsenal, Kyiv
- 2006 Personal exhibition “Celestial Chronicle”, The National Art Museum of Ukraine, Kyiv
- 2005 National Project “Your Children, Ukraine” at the 51st Venice Biennale
- 2005 Project “Your Children, Ukraine”, Diploma and 1-st Prize, The Gallery of the National Ukrainian Artist Trade Union, Kyiv
- 2004 “Ukrainian Rural Photo (from Mykola Babak’s private collection)” V International Photobiennale, Moscow Museum of Modern Art, Moscow
- 2003 “The Ukrainian Retrospective”, I Kyiv Photobiennale, Art Foundation Gallery, Kyiv
- 2002 “The Ukrainian World of Painting”, Beijing
- 2000 “Collection of Axiomatic”, The Gallery of the National Ukrainian Artist Trade Union, Kyiv
- 1999 Personal Exhibition “Telluris”, The National Art Museum of Ukraine, Kyiv
- 1993 “People with People”, Poland

== Collecting ==
In 1990, Babak began to collect Ukrainian folk art. He has collections of folk icons of the 18th - 20th centuries, folk naïve paintings, folk photos and household items of the Central Upper Dnieper River Region. The collection of folk icons is considered to be the most outstanding while it represents the iconography of Taras Shevchenko's land where the basis of the Ukrainian nation, language and culture was formed.
