= Vynnyky =

City in Lviv Oblast, Ukraine

Vynnyky Винники
- City
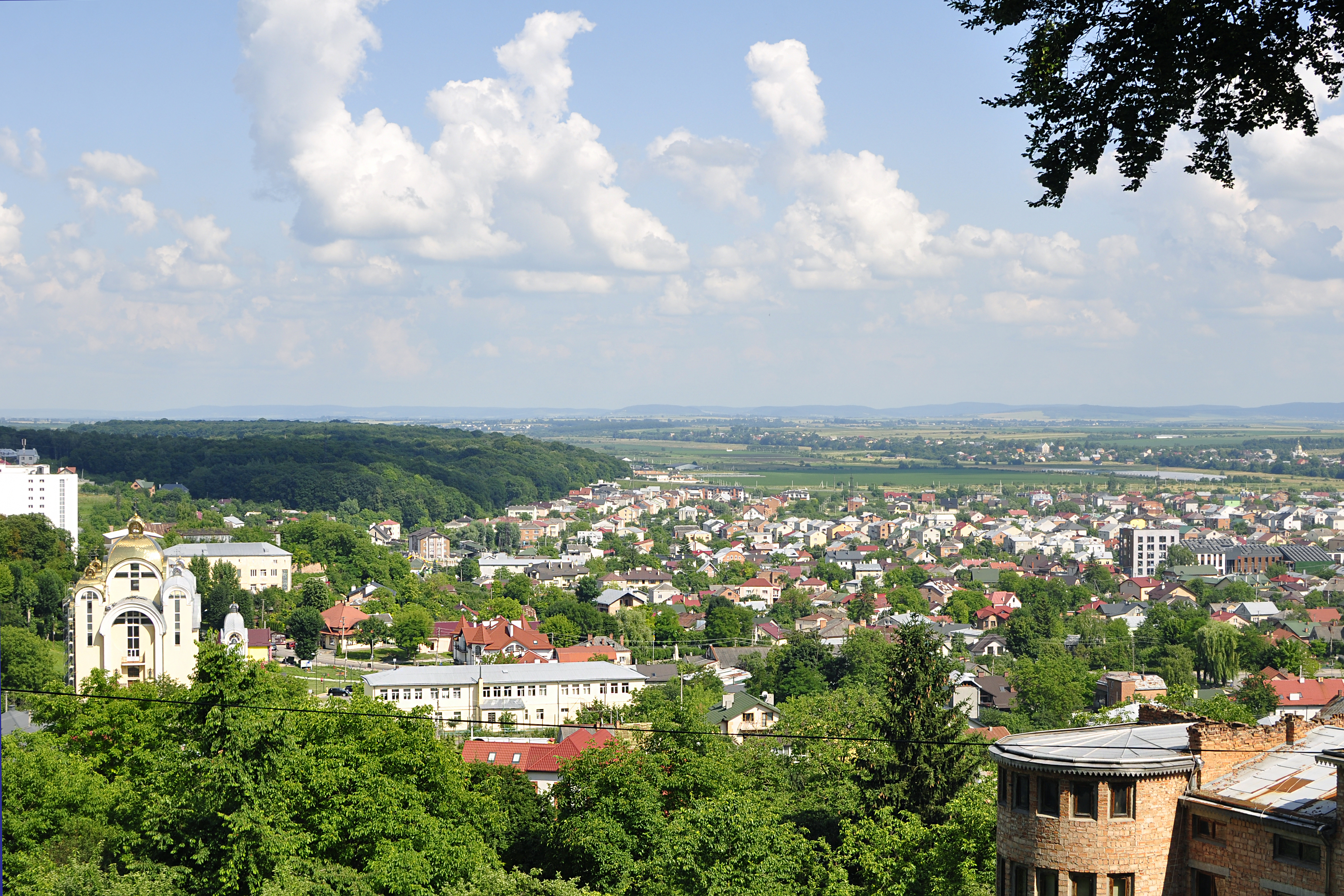
- View of Vynnyky

- Flag Seal

- Location of Vynnyky, Ukraine Vynnyky (Ukraine)
- Coordinates: 49°48′56″N 24°07′47″E
- Country: Ukraine
- Oblast: Lviv Oblast
- Raion: Lviv Raion
- Hromada: Lviv urban hromada
- First mentioned: 1368

Area
  - Total: 6.7 km^{2} (2.6 sq mi)

Population (2022)
  - Total: 19,037
  - Density: 2,800/km^{2} (7,400/sq mi)
- Area code: +380-322

Vynnyky (Ukrainian: Винники, IPA: [ˈwɪnːɪkɪ], Polish: Winniki) is a small city in Lviv Raion, Lviv Oblast (region) of Ukraine. It belongs to Lviv urban hromada, one of the hromadas of Ukraine. Its population was estimated to be 19,037 (2022 estimate).

== History ==
From the mid-14th century until the Partitions of Poland, Vynnyky (called Winniki in Polish) belonged to the Ruthenian Voivodeship of the Kingdom of Poland. From 1772 to 1918, it was part of Austrian Galicia, and in the interbellum period, the town returned to Poland, as part of the Lwow Voivodeship. In 1925 the city had 6,000 residents, out of which 3,300 were Polish, 2,150 Ruthenian (Ukrainian), 350 Jewish, and 200 German.

The first sculptural monument to Ukrainian national poet Taras Shevchenko was opened in Vynnyky on 28 September 1913, financed by the local Prosvita society. The unveiling ceremony was attended by prominent members of Galicia's Ukrainian community, including committee leader Volodymyr Levytsky, Austrian parliament member Yevhen Olesnytsky and poet Bohdan Lepky. The monument was destroyed in 1919 during the Polish-Ukrainian War.

During the 1950s Vynnyky served as a district centre of Lviv Oblast. From 1959 and until 18 July 2020, Vynnyky belonged to Lviv Municipality. The municipality was abolished in July 2020 as part of the administrative reform of Ukraine, which reduced the number of raions of Lviv Oblast to seven. The area of Lviv Municipality was merged into the newly established Lviv Raion.

== Economy ==
A tobacco factory operates in the city.

== Gallery ==
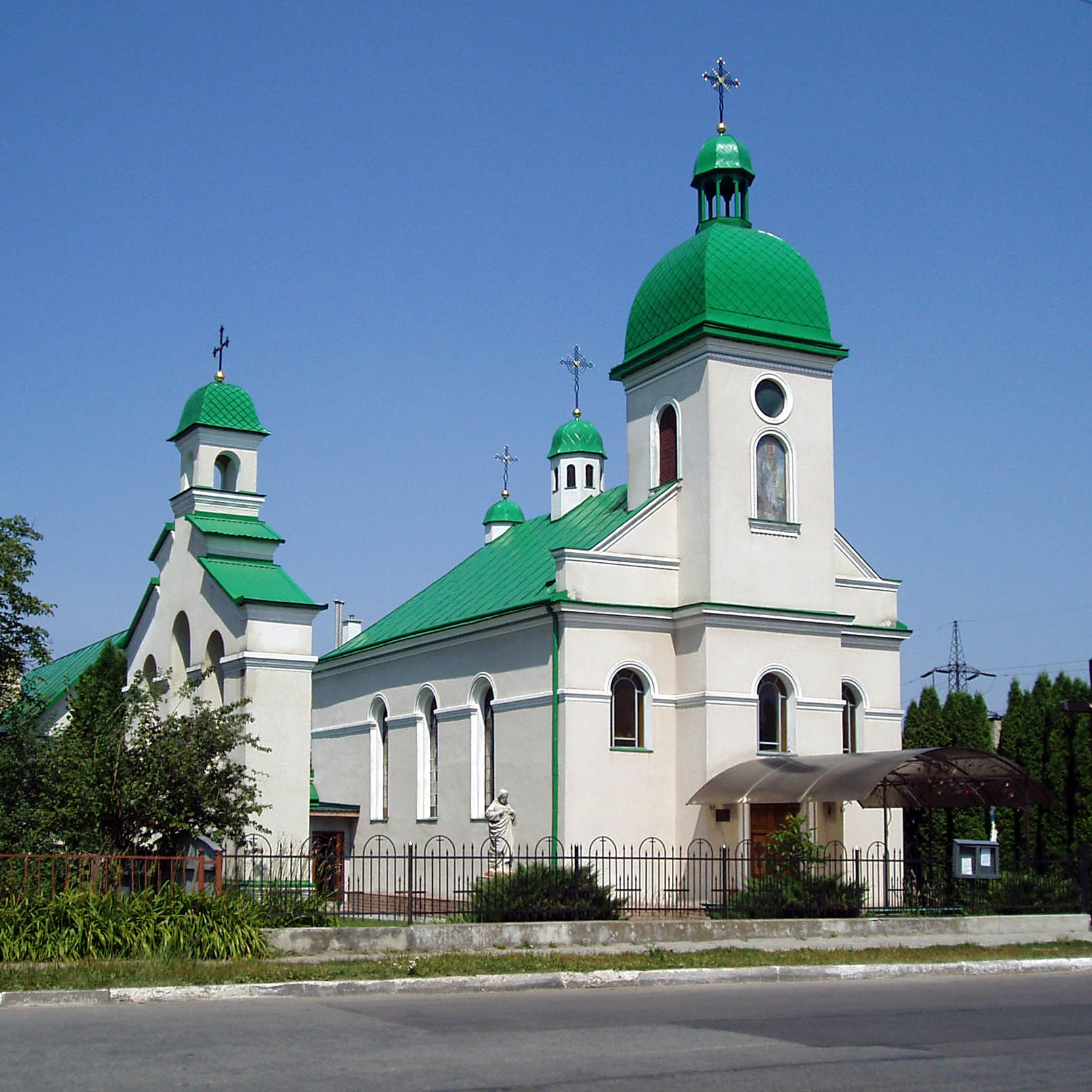
Church of the Nativity of St. John the Baptist

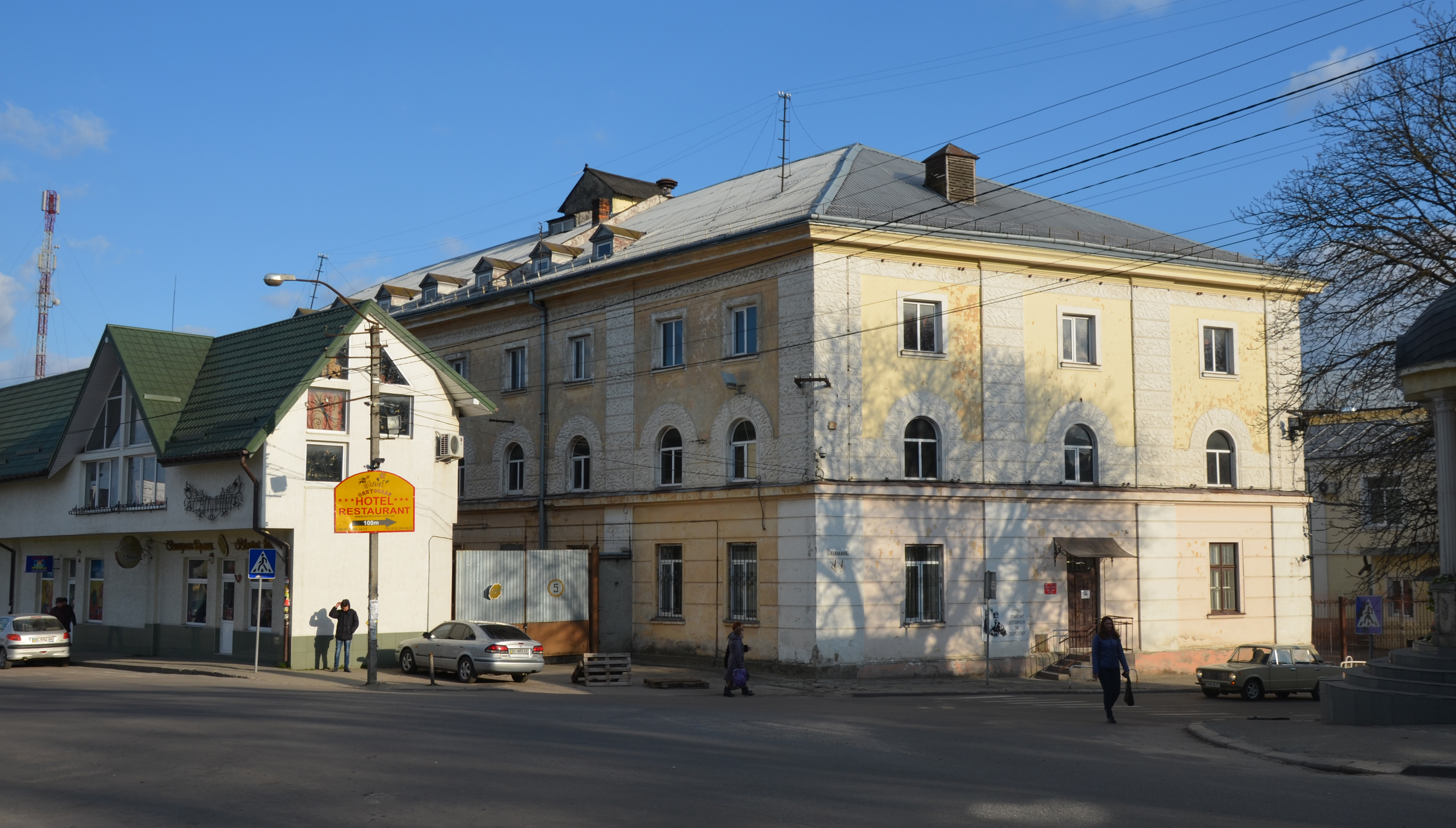
Stores and cigarette factory

== Notable people ==
- Andreas Bolek (1894–1945) – Austrian Nazi
- Lyubomyr Dmyterko (1911–1985) – Soviet and Ukrainian poet, writer, playwright
- Katrya Hrynevycheva (1875–1947) – Ukrainian writer and community leader
- Ivan Lypa (1865–1923) – Ukrainian author and politician
- Myron Markevych (born 1951) — Ukrainian football manager

== International Relations ==
=== Twin towns – sister cities ===
Vynnyky is twinned with:

- Dębica, Poland
- Milovice, Czech Republic
