= BM Babak-Matveev =

Ukrainian art duo

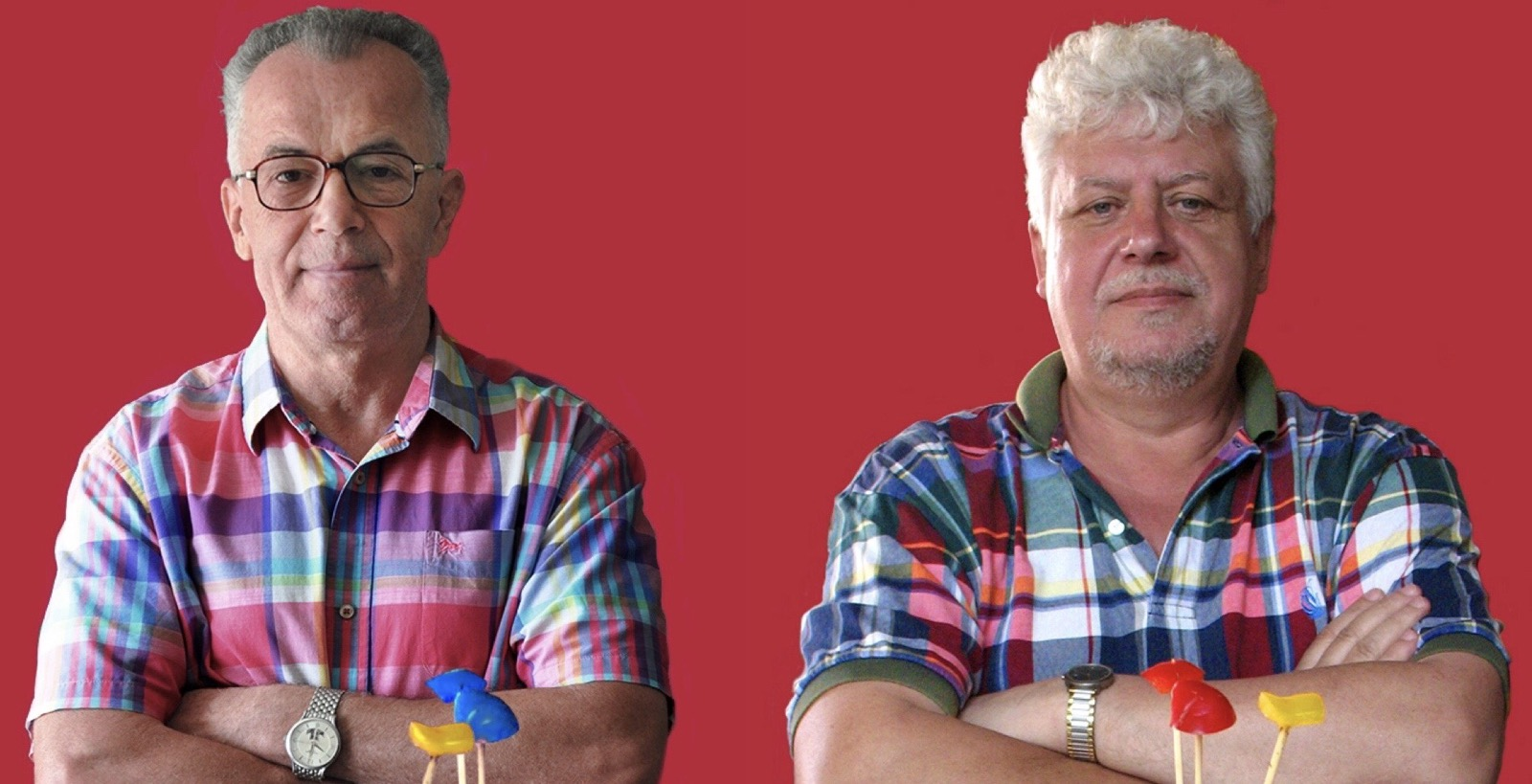
- Babak and Matveev in 2014
- Known for: Art
- Movement: Contemporary, digital

BM Babak-Matveev is an art-duo of Ukrainian artists Mykola Babak and Evgene Matveev, created in 2014. Before working together, they were successfully realized as independent artists and won the highest state title, becoming People's Artists of Ukraine and winners of the Taras Shevchenko National Prize.

Mykola Babak in 2005 represented Ukraine at the Venice Biennale with the national project "Your Children, Ukraine". Evgene Matveev was a participant of the Autumn Salon in Paris in 1990. Both artists have participated in many exhibitions, competitions, biennials in Ukraine and abroad. They have created dozens of large-scale art projects and won national and international awards and prizes.

The first collaboration between Babak and Matveev took place within the framework of the implementation of unique art publishing projects. The artists created their first art project called "Sacrifice" in 2014. It consists of six epic compositions measuring 3 by 6 metres (9.8 ft × 19.7 ft) each. Since 2017, BM has been collaborating with the New York Gallery AGCA and its owner Alexandre Gertsman. In 2018, the first personal exhibition of artists took place in the United States. In 2021, BM was for three times successfully presented at the American auction ShapiroAuctions, where their paintings "Bon Appetites" and "I'll be back", and a series of digital photos "Messages from "Paradise" were purchased for private collections.

BM works in almost all types and genres of contemporary art. As the result of collaboration they've created more than a dozen large art projects and series, numbering several hundred works. To date, the artists' latest project is the polyptych "13 Covid Rooms" (2021, digital art, 2 m × 8 m [6 ft 7 in × 26 ft 3 in]), which after a successful presentation in Ukraine is exhibited at the AGCA Gallery on Broadway (New York).

== Exhibitions ==
Solo

- 2018 — "Fantasy and Fury: an Artistic Journey from Kyiv to New York", Alexandre Gertsman Contemporary Art Gallery, New York

Group

- 2022 — "13 rooms COVID" Project (online exhibition), Alexandre Gertsman Contemporary Art Gallery, New York
- 2021 — "13 rooms COVID" Project, Korsaky Museum of the Ukrainian Contemporary Art, Lutsk
- 2021 — "Intermission", 17th International Exhibition of Contemporary Art, Cherkasy Art Museum
- 2020 — "Dialogues", tenth International Exhibition of Contemporary Art, Cherkasy Art Museum
- 2020 — "Art in the Time of Plague", Virtual Exhibition
- 2018 — "Revelations", Alexandre Gertsman Contemporary Art Gallery, New York
- 2017 — "The 3d Anniversary of Maidan", Cherkasy Art Museum
- 2017 — "The Multidimensional Context of Art Beyond Post-Soviet Borders", Alexandre Gertsman Contemporary Art Gallery, New York
