= Les Kurbas Theatre =

Theater in Ukraine

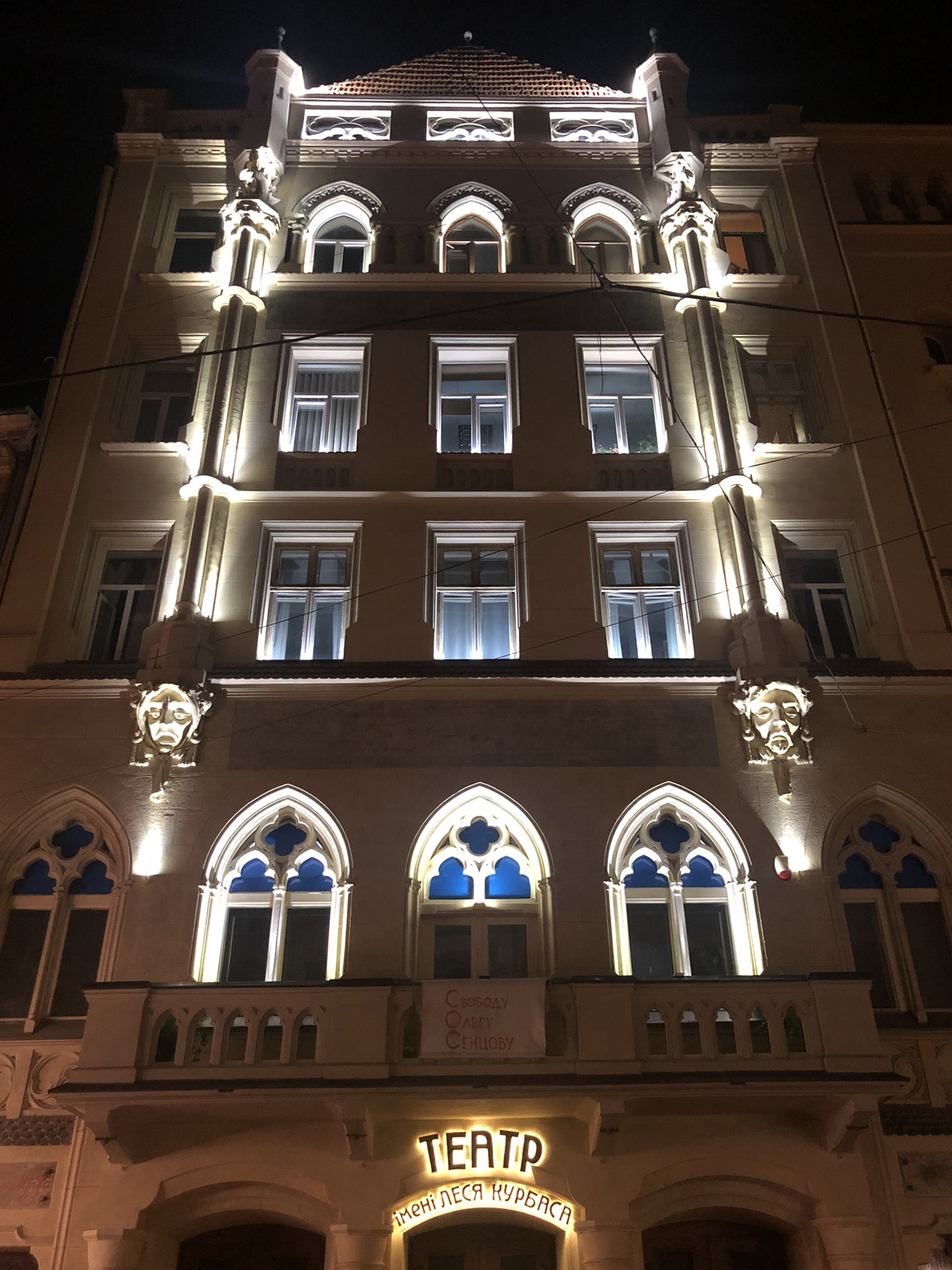
Les Kurbas Theater, Lviv.

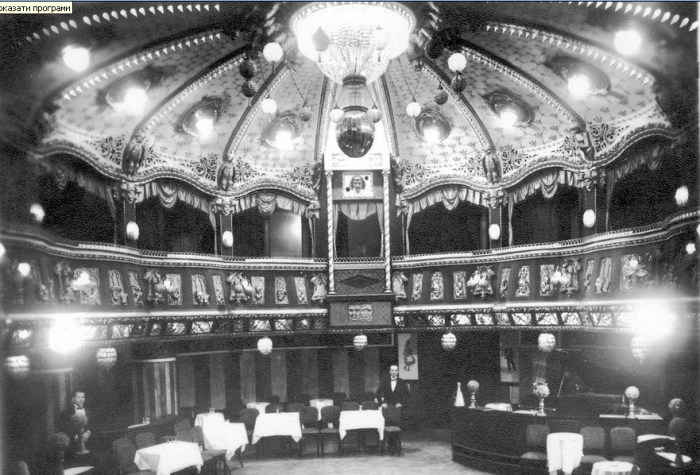
Interior of the Casino de Paris, which now houses the L. Kurbas Theater. Photo of the first floor. 20th century.

The Les Kurbas Lviv Academic Theater was founded in 1988 by Volodymyr Kuchynsky and a group of young actors who, like the outstanding Ukrainian director Les Kurbas and his colleagues in 1918, felt the need to create a theater. Many of those younger actors previously performed at the Maria Zankovetska Theatre in Lviv. Oleh Mykhailovych Tsyona has been the artistic director of the Les Kurbas Theatre since 2019.

Since its founding, the Les Kurbas Theater has grown into a well-respected theater group, both in Ukraine and abroad. Performances at the theater including: "Garden of Unthawed Sculptures" by Lina Kostenko; "Grateful Herod" and "Narcissus" by Hryhoriy Skovoroda; "Between Two Forces" by Volodymyr Vynnychenko; "In the Field of Blood," "Johanna, Herod's Wife," and "Apocrypha" by Lesia Ukrainka; "Dreams" and "Zabavy dlya Fausta" by Fyodor Dostoevsky; "Praise to Eros" and "Silenus Alcibiadis" by Plato; "Marco the Cursed or Oriental Legend" by Vasyl Stus; and "Waiting for Godot" by Samuel Beckett winning honors at numerous international theater festivals.

== Theater building ==
The authors of the design of the theater building were Z. Fedorskyi and S. Matsudzinskyi. The building was designed in the style of modernized historicism of the early twentieth century. The five-story building is made of brick and covered with tiles. At the level of the third floor, the façade wall is divided by semi-columns supported by consoles and crowned with Gothic turrets and sculptures of chimeras. The façade composition is dominated by vertical accents, complemented by horizontal cornices and rods that divide the façade into tiers. The windows have rectangular or lancet-arched shapes. A wide balcony overhangs the main entrance leading to the theater foyer; a side entrance leads to the upper floors. The facade of the building is decorated in the Secession and Neo-Gothic styles.

=== Architecture ===
The oval hall is 11.5 meters deep and 6.5 meters high with a 4.5 by 5.5 meter stage mirror. Metal is used in the construction of beams and boxes. Ornamental paintings by Zygmunt Balk, balconies decorated with bas-reliefs by Franciszek Bernat. The curtain "Bacchanalia" by Marian Olszewski.

=== The history of the house ===
In 1908, the Vienna Architectural Bureau designed a three-story Art Nouveau theater building. In 1909, the project was redesigned by Lviv architects Zygmunt Fedorsky and Stanisław Matsudzinski. The architects created not only a neo-Gothic-style building, but also decorated the interior and created the interior. The ornamental painting by Sigmund Balk turned the ceiling into a fantastic flower. The facade of the house, as well as the balcony and the stage mirror in the interior, were decorated with grotesque bas-reliefs by Franciszek Bernat based on medieval and theatrical motifs. The elegant, luxurious interior of the theater was striking in its beauty.

The stand on Virmenska street (1911–1918) featured a poster for the Casino de Paris, which announced a performance of Joseph Strauss's operetta Die Fledermaus. In 1911–1918, the Variety House had a cinema, possibly a screening of the first film adaptation of Ernst Lubitsch's 1917 film Das Fidele Gefängnis.

In 1916–1918, the cinema was owned by the Red Cross. In 1916, the cinema changed its name to the Red Cross Cinema. A significant part of its profits was donated to help soldiers and their families. The cinema existed until 1918. It ceased to function after the representative office of the Vienna studio Urania ceased its activities in Lviv after the end of World War I.

In 1920, the Bagatelle literary and artistic theater began operating in the building. The most successful years of the theater's work were during the time of its director, Mr. Bronisław Bronowski. Critics called this theater a real artistic cabaret, modeled on the best Western traditions.

In 1925, family dancing was launched, which became a very popular pastime among Lviv residents. Ukrainian theater figures also loved this place. For example, in the years 26 and 27, the Stadnyk's troupe performed here. In the 1930s, during the heyday of jazz, a variety of jazz performers from all over the world were frequent guests on the stage of the Casino de Paris. In 37 and 39, Eddie Rozner even performed with his band.

In 1940, the building became the property of the Soviet administration. The state regional philharmonic, with an orchestra, operated here. In the early 1950s, the Palace of Pioneers (Pioneers Palace) functioned in the building. In the 1960s, the building housed the Regional Center for Folk Art.

In the late 80s, when the movement of studio theaters began, 1988 was marked by a special event - the birth of the Lviv Ukrainian Youth Theater, which later became the Les Kurbas Theater.

On March 2, 2020, a gala evening on the occasion of the 110th anniversary of the opening of the Casino de Paris Variety Theater was held with the presentation of the exhibition "Stories. Space. Time" exhibition dedicated to the history of the venue.

== Cultural heritage designation and location ==
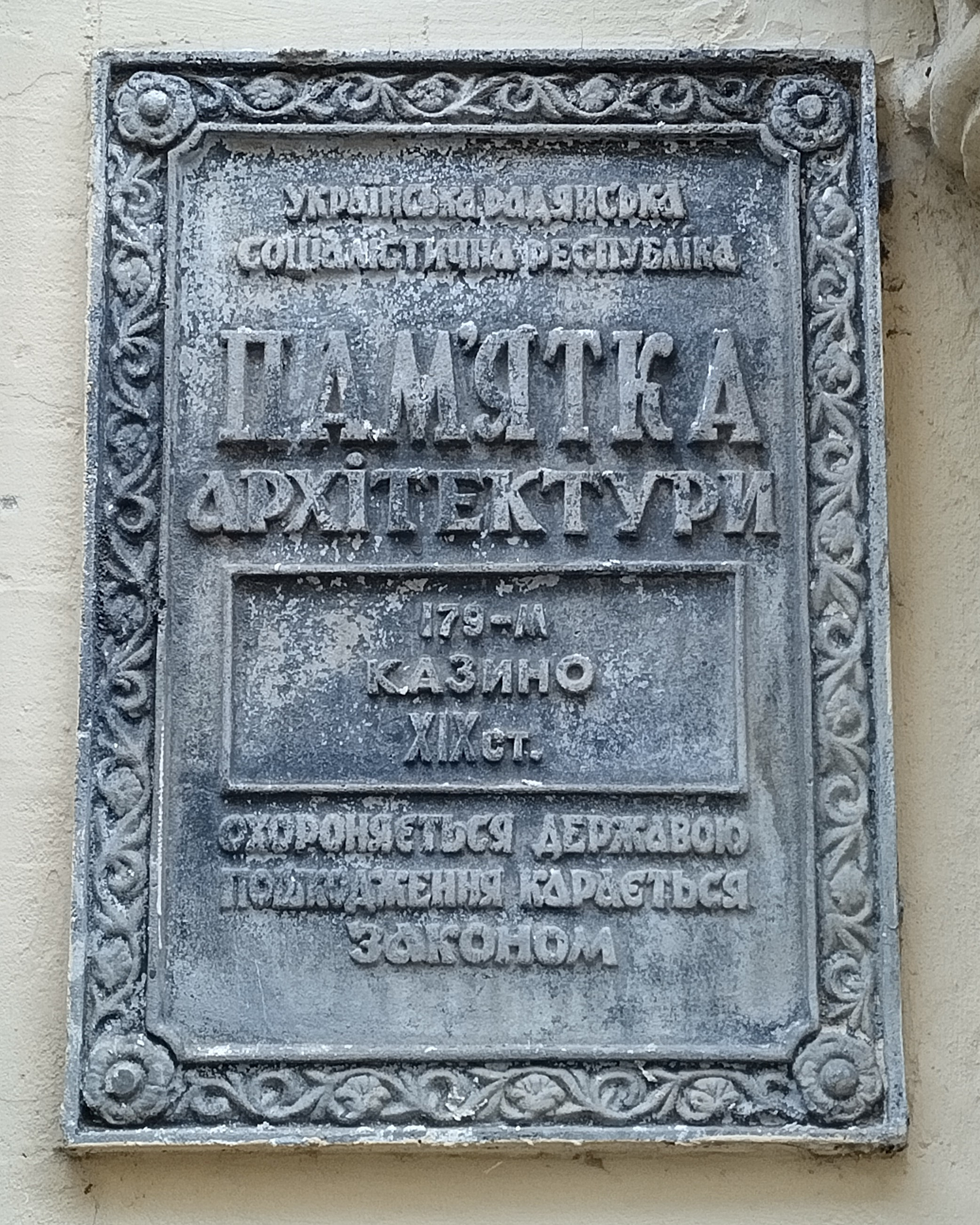
Landmark placard

As an architectural landmark, the building has been protected by the state since Ukraine was part of the Soviet Union (Ukrainian SSR). The placard identifies the building as the 19th-century casino.

The theater is located near the Lviv Old Town (Historic center) across Svobody prospect.
