= Eduard Shorin =

Ukrainian Soviet party official

- Born: Ukrainian: Едуард Олексійович Шорін; December 4, 1933; Mykolaiv
- Died: August 3, 1993 (aged 59); Mykolaiv
- Occupation: Ukrainian Soviet party official

Eduard Shorin (Ukrainian: Едуард Олексійович Шорін, December 4, 1933, Mykolaiv – August 3, 1993, Mykolaiv) was a Ukrainian Soviet party official. He was a deputy of the 10th convocation of the Supreme Soviet of the Ukrainian SSR.

== Biography ==
He was born into the family of a shop foreman at the Mykolaiv Shipyard. In July 1941, he and his family were evacuated to Astrakhan, where he attended secondary school. In March 1944, the family returned to Mykolaiv. In 1951, he graduated from Mykolaiv school no. 1.

In 1957, he graduated from the Mykolaiv Shipbuilding Institute with a degree in shipbuilding engineering.

In 1957, he began his career as an assistant shipbuilder at the Mykolaiv Shipbuilding Plant named after the 61 Communards.

Member of the Communist Party of the Soviet Union since 1959.

From 1959 to 1961, he served as First Secretary of the Mykolaiv City Committee of the Leninist Communist Youth League of Ukraine.

From December 1961 to 1964, he worked as a shipbuilder and deputy head of the assembly and welding shop at the Mykolaiv Shipyard.

From January 1964, he worked for the Communist Party. January 1964–1965 — Instructor in the Defense Industry Department of the Mykolaiv Regional Committee of the Communist Party of Ukraine (CPU). November 1965–1966 — Second Secretary, and 1966–1971 — First Secretary of the Zavodskyi District Committee of the CPU in the city of Mykolaiv.

From June 1971 to 1973, he served as head of the defense industry department of the Mykolaiv Regional Committee of the Communist Party of Ukraine.

From December 10, 1973, to 1983, he served as first secretary of the Mykolaiv City Committee of the Communist Party of Ukraine in Mykolaiv Oblast.

From 1983 to 1992 — First Deputy Chairman of the Executive Committee of the Mykolaiv Regional Council of People’s Deputies - Head of the Main Planning and Economic Department.

He retired in 1992. He died and was buried in Mykolaiv.

== Awards ==
- Order of the Red Banner of Labour (1966)
- Order of the Badge of Honour (1966)
- Recipient of the Shevchenko State Prize of the Ukrainian SSR (1981) — for establishing the Museum of Shipbuilding and the Navy.

== Commemoration ==
On November 6, 2009, in Mykolaiv, a memorial plaque was unveiled on the facade of building No. 56 on Admiral Makarov Street, where Shorin lived from 1968 to 1993.
