= Petr Holota =

Czech footballer (born 1965)

Personal information
- Date of birth: 16 May 1965 (age 61)
- Place of birth: Czechoslovakia
- Height: 1.75 m (5 ft 9 in)
- Position: Defender

Senior career*
Years	Team	Apps	(Gls)
1987–1991	Bohemians Prague		
1991–1992	SK Slavia Prague		
1992–2001	FK Viktoria Žižkov		

International career
1991	Czechoslovakia	1	(0)
- * Club domestic league appearances and goals

Petr Holota (born 16 May 1965) is a Czech former football player. He represented Czechoslovakia once, playing against Australia in 1991. He played in the top flight of his country, making more than 200 top-flight appearances spanning the existence of the Czechoslovak First League and the Gambrinus liga.
