= Pavlo Kazarin =

Ukrainian journalist (born 1983)

- Павло Казарін
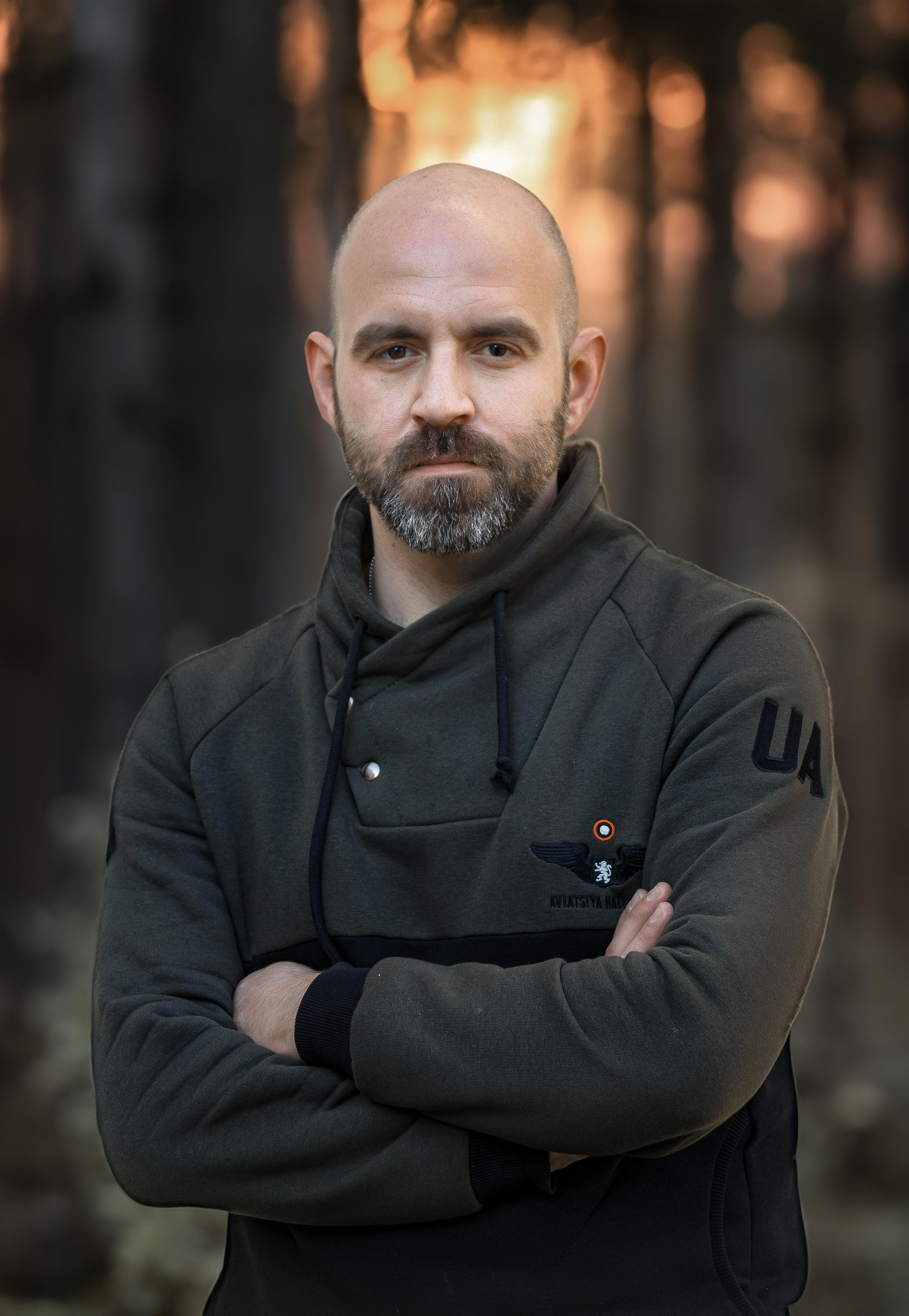
- Born: 3 December 1983 (age 42); Simferopol, Crimean Oblast, Ukrainian SSR
- Citizenship: Ukraine
- Education: Tavrida National V.I. Vernadsky University
- Occupations: Journalist, soldier of the Armed Forces of Ukraine
- Military career
- Conflicts: Russo-Ukrainian War; Battle of Bakhmut

Pavlo Volodymyrovych Kazarin (Ukrainian: Павло Володимирович Казарін; born 3 December 1983) is a Ukrainian bilingual journalist, publicist, and philologist-literary critic.

== Biography ==
His father — Volodymyr Kazarin (born 1952), is a teacher of Russian literature, who moved with his wife from Vladivostok, Russia to Simferopol, Ukraine. His mother is a biochemist.

In 2005, he graduated from Tavriya National University named after Vernadskyi. He has been working in the media since 2004. He worked at DTRK "Crimea". From 2012 to 2014 he lived and worked in Moscow. He collaborated with the publications "Slon.ru", "Radio Svoboda", "Nova Gazeta" and the Carnegie Moscow Center.

At the end of March 2014, after the annexation of Crimea, he received a passport as a citizen of the Russian Federation in Simferopol. In January 2021, Russia allowed Kazarin to renounce Russian citizenship.

He was a host of the many shows at ICTV channel, UA:First, 24 Channel. He also hosted several projects on Radio NV and Radio Liberty.

In 2021, he published an award-winning book called Wild West of Eastern Europe (2021), English translation - ibidem Press, 2025.

With the beginning of Russia's invasion of Ukraine, he joined the territorial defense forces of the Armed Forces of Ukraine and currently fights on the east front against Russian forces. In March 2023 he took part in the Battle of Bakhmut.
