= Lyubomyr Dmyterko =

Ukrainian and Soviet poet and writer

- Born: Lyubomyr Dmytrovych Dmyterko; 18 March 1911; Vynnyky, Kingdom of Galicia and Lodomeria, Austria-Hungary
- Died: 2 October 1985 (aged 74); Kyiv, Ukrainian SSR, Soviet Union
- Resting place: Baikove Cemetery
- Citizenship: Soviet Union
- Education: Kamyanets-Podilsky University; All-Ukrainian Photo Cinema Administration screenwriting courses
- Occupations: poet, writer, playwright
- Years active: 1938–1995
- Organization(s): Union of Soviet Writers; Writer's Union of Ukraine
- Political party: CPSU
- Movement: Socialist realism
- Awards: Shevchenko National Prize

Lyubomyr Dmytrovych Dmyterko (Ukrainian: Любомир Дмитрович Дмитерко) was a Soviet and Ukrainian poet, prose writer, war journalist, literary critic, screenwriter, playwright, interpreter. He was a member of the Union of Soviet Writers since 1935. He also is a recipient of the 1979 Shevchenko state award of Ukraine in literature. Dmyterko became one of three members of the Western Ukraine literary group who did not end up in the Soviet Gulag system after being arrested in connection with the 1933 Ukrainian Military Organization case.

== Biography ==
Dmyterko was born in a suburb of Lviv (Lemberg), Vynnyky, in 1911, in a family of a village teacher. When he was three years of age, the World War I erupted. Later in his adulthood memoirs he recollected:

When I remember my childhood, paths-roads come to mind. Endless roads of refugee misfortunes. The World War I, I am three years old, and I am already distant lands away from my native house. A short-term return to the picturesque Vynnyki, and again escape from the White Polish gangs of Hallerites and Pilsudskites. My childhood ended in charming Kamianets-Podilskyi and the surrounding villages, where my late father was a teacher.

In 1919, fleeing from the "White Polish armies", the Dmyterko family moved to Kamianets-Podilskyi.

He studied in Kamianets-Podilsky Institute of National Education (today Kamyanets-Podilsky Ivan Ohienko National University). In 1930, he studied at screenwriting courses in the All-Ukrainian Photo Cinema Administration.

His first works "Idu!", "Viter zi Skhodu" (both 1930), "Tovtry" (1931) were criticized for "ideological intolerance".

During the German-Soviet War (Eastern Front), Dmyterko worked as a correspondent of the frontline newspaper. After the war, he worked at the Dovzhenko Film Studios.

As one of chairmen of the Ukrainian Writer's Union of early 1950s, he participated in Soviet official exposure campaigns.

In 1958 and 1962, as part of the Ukrainian SSR delegation, Dmyterko participated in the sessions of the General Assembly of the United Nations.

For many years, he was a deputy president of the Football Federation of the Ukrainian SSR.

In 1962–1985, Dmyterko was a chief editor of the "Vitchyzna" magazine (official media outlet of the Writer's Union of Ukraine) where he published "Sobor" of Oles Honchar, "Malvy" of Roman Ivanychuk, "Pivdennyi komfront" of Pavlo Zahrebelnyi and others. Dmyterko is an author of over 50 works of poetry and prose: "Rozluka" (1957), "Mist cherez prirvu" (1966), "Ostanni kilometry" and others; stage plays: "Heneral Vatutin" (1948), "Naviky razom" (1950), "Vohnevi rubezhi" (1985) that were staged in many Ukrainian theaters; books, articles and essays about Ukrainian literary Soviet epoch. Selected works of Dmyterko are translated into Russian, Georgian, Lithuanian, German, Polish, Romanian, Hungarian, Czech, and most commonly, Bulgarian (over 20 translations), languages.

Dmyterko had impression that the Hrushevsky's death in Kislovodsk was carried out deliberately. Mykhailo Hrushevsky was also among those who were incriminated in participation in the Ukrainian Military Organization.

== Awards and honours ==
- Order of the Patriotic War, 1st Class
- Order of the Red Star
- Order of the Red Banner of Labour (twice)
- Order of Friendship of Peoples
- Shevchenko National Prize
