= Lyubov Holota =

Ukrainian author (born 1949)

Lyubov Holota (born 31 December 1949) is a Ukrainian author. She has written prose works, poetry and journalism and was granted the award of "Honoured Cultural Worker of Ukraine". In 2008 she became a Shevchenko Laureate, having received the Shevchenko Premier for the groundbreaking novel Episodic Memory.

== Biography ==
Lyubov Holota was born into a mining family on the 31 December 1949 in Kryvyi Rih, Dnipropetrovsk Oblast. In 1972 she graduated from the philological faculty of Dnipropetrovsk State University. She subsequently worked as a journalist in Dnipropetrovsk at the provincial newspapers Zorya and Prapor Yunosti and at the province's radio station. She has lived in Kyiv since 1983 and worked at the Molod and Radyanskyy Pysmennyk publishing houses. From 1995 onwards she has been the Chief Editor of Slovo Prosvity, the weekly national paper of the prominent Ukrainian cultural organisation Prosvita. Holota organised and published the first women's cultural journal in Independent Ukraine, Pyata Pora, and has authored the scenarios for many of the Ukrainian capital's large scale festivities and events. She edited the book Zhyttya i Chyn Anatoliya Pohribnoho. Naukovi rozvidky, statti, spohady, which was published in 2011. Her most notable recent achievement was the publication of Episodic Memory, a groundbreaking novel which deploys Tulving's theory of memory as a metaphor for changes within Ukrainian society and shifts in the human psyche caused by globalisation. The Ukrainian critic Dmytro Drozdovskyi described how the language used in the book "enchants" the reader and described the novel as "a profound manifestation of the moderrnist style".

== Works ==
=== Poetry collections ===
- Narodzhena v stepakh (1976)
- Vesnyane rivnodennya (1979)
- Horytsvit (1980)
- Vikna (1983)
- Zhinky i ptytsi (1986)
- Dzerkala (1988)
- Na cholovichyy holos (1996)
- Oprominena chasom (2001)

=== Publicity books ===
- Dytya lyudske (2002)
- Sotvorinnya (2005)

=== Novels ===
- Epizodychna pamyat (2007)

Holota is also the author of several children's books.

== Civic and party political work ==
The roles taken on by Lyubov Holota in her extensive public career include:

- Member of the National Union of Writers of Ukraine since 1977.
- A former member of the Communist Party of the Soviet Union (from 1979 onwards until the abolition of the party).
- A member of the central governing body of the national cultural organisation "Vseukrainskoho tovarystva "Prosvity" i. T.Shevchenka"

== Awards ==
- 1981— The Georgian Volodymyr Mayakovsky award
- 2001— The prize named after Volodymyr Sosiura "Lyubit Ukrainu"
- 2008— Shevchenko National Prize for the novel Epizodychna Pamyat ('Episodic Memory')

== See also ==
- List of Shevchenko National Prize laureates#2008
