= Cossacks (film series) =

Animated film series (1967–1995)

- "Cossacks" cartoon characters Burmylo, Korotun, and Sylach
- Как казаки (Russian); Як козаки (Ukrainian)
- Genre: TV animated series, short comedy film
- Directed by: Volodymyr Dakhno, Tadeush Pavlenko
- Narrated by: Eduard Kirych, Yevhen Malukha (in Ukrainian); Andrii Soboliev (in Russian)
- Composers: Ihor Poklad; Myroslav Skoryk; Volodymyr Huba; Borys Buievskyi
- Countries of origin: Soviet Union; Ukraine
- Original languages: Ukrainian; Russian
- No. of seasons: 1
- No. of episodes: 9

Production
- Cinematography: Anatoliy Havrylov
- Running time: 10–20 min.
- Production companies: Kyivnaukfilm (initial series); Baraban animation studios; UkrAnimaFilm

Original release
- Network: USSR: UT (till 1992): Ukraine: Pershyi; Suspilne Kultura; Inter; NTN; K1; K2; Piksel TV; Enter–film
- Release: 1967 – 1995

Related
- uk:Козаки. Футбол 2016; uk:Козаки. Навколо світу 2018

Cossacks (Russian: Казаки, romanized: Kazaki; Ukrainian: Козаки, romanized: Kozaky) is a series of Soviet-Ukrainian animated comedy short films originally shot at the Kyivnaukfilm film studio and in later series created by the UkrAnimaFilm and Baraban animation studios. This series is sometimes titled Yak Kozaky (Як Козаки, How the Cossacks) in Ukrainian or Kak Kazaki (Как казаки) in Russian.

The author of the original script and director was Volodymyr Dakhno. The first episode was released in 1967 and was titled "How the Cossacks Cooked Kulish". The cartoon immediately gained popularity and its heroes became Ukrainian cartoon classics.

== Description ==
Loosely based on Alexander Dumas' three musketeers, the series features the adventures of three Zaporozhian Cossacks: Burmylo, Korotun and Sylach, also in the script called Gray, Oko, and Tur, who are always portrayed nameless. Director-animator Volodymyr Dakhno describes them as having unique personalities: "Gray turned out to be cunning and prudent, Tur - shy and sentimental, and Oko - cheerful and belligerent."

The depiction of the characters referenced Zaporozhian Cossacks, iconic in the Ukrainian imagination. Eleanor Cowen in her book, "Animation Behind the Iron Curtain" summarized the historical reference for the cartoon series:

"With their distinctive clothing and men boasting impressive mustaches, the Cossacks were notorious as hard drinking rebels who turned into a semi-independent society in the 16th and 17th centuries. Their members rejected serfdom and fought for independence from foreign rule. Though the historical Cossacks lost their autonomous status by the late 18th century, their cultural mystique lives on in the Ukrainian consciousness. Cossacks are to Ukrainians what cowboys are to Americans, seen as spirited renegades and frontiersmen. They remain colorful, heroic characters in the Ukrainian imagination."

In the cartoon series, the characters get into various adventures, meeting people from different countries and eras, even gods and aliens. There are no dialogues in the cartoons or any text, except for the introductory or concluding word "from the author" - the action takes place in the form of intuitive scenes.

== History ==
In total, eight cartoons about the Cossacks were originally created, with the ninth released in 1995:

*not a part of series

Year	English translation	Original title
1967	How the Cossacks Cooked Kulish	«uk:Як козаки куліш варили»
1969*	How the Cossack Searched for Happiness	«uk:Як козак щастя шукав»
1970	How the Cossacks Played Football	«uk:Як козаки у футбол грали»
1973	How the Cossacks Rescued the Brides	«uk:Як козаки наречених визволяли»
1975	How the Cossacks Bought Salt	«uk:Як козаки сіль купували»
1978	How the Cossacks Became the Olympians	«uk:Як козаки олімпійцями стали»
1979	How the Cossacks Helped the Musketeers	«uk:Як козаки мушкетерам допомагали»
1984	How the Cossacks Celebrated a Wedding	«uk:Як козаки на весіллі гуляли»
1987	How the Cossacks Met the Aliens	«uk:Як козаки інопланетян зустрічали»
1995	How the Cossacks Played Hockey	«uk:Як козаки у хокей грали»

In 1988, Anatoliy Havrylov (cinematography), Volodymyr Dakhno (film director) and Eduard Kirych (character artist) were awarded the Shevchenko National Prize for their work on the series.

In 2012, the characters were considered unofficial mascots during Ukraine's hosting of UEFA Euro 2012.

In the early 2010s, the Ukranimafilm studio began preparing for the release of additional episodes of the animated series, "How the Cossacks…", which was to include 13 episodes. It was planned that the favorite characters would appear before the audience in the spring of 2014. The premiere of the new series took place in 2016 and 2018. This new series was worked on by the Ukrainian non-commercial animation studio, Baraban Animation Studio.

== See also ==
- History of Soviet animation
- History of Ukrainian animation
- KyivNaukFilm
- Volodymyr Dakhno
