= How the Cossacks Played Football =

1970 Soviet animated short film

- Directed by: Volodymyr Dakhno
- Written by: Volodymyr Kapustyan
- Cinematography: Anatoliy Havrylov
- Music by: Boris Buievskyi
- Production company: Kyivnaukfilm
- Release date: 1970
- Running time: 17 min 33 sec
- Country: Soviet Union
- Language: Russian credits

How the Cossacks Played Football (Russian: «Как казаки в футбол играли») is a Soviet animated short film from the Kyivnaukfilm studio, released in 1970, it is one of the most famous episode and the third story in the "Cossacks" series.

== Plot ==
The animated film begins with the Cossacks awaiting the return of Gray, Oko, and Tur from London. Upon their return, they not only share stories about the city but also introduce a game they witnessed there — football. The Cossack troop then starts training to win the football championship cup in England. The three Cossacks, who taught others the basics of football, gather a team and head West to the accompaniment of the Cossack March, leaving their weapons at home.

The Cossacks play in three European countries. The first, unnamed country is indicated by the scoreboard displaying the word "Knights" during the score presentation, presumably representing players from medieval Germany. Initially, the Cossacks struggle to break through the knights' defense, dressed in armor. They counter the knights with agility, playing in a way that prevents their opponents from intercepting the ball.

In France, they play against musketeers in a palace. The musketeers elegantly pass the ball to each other, but the Cossacks rely on lively pressure based on the movements of the Ukrainian folk dance Hopak and win the match.

The match in England takes place in London. Initially, the field is soaked due to rain, and the English stand on small islands, passing the ball between them. Tur then hits the ball into the clouds, stopping the rain. The field dries up, allowing the Cossacks to quickly outplay the English. The English queen reluctantly presents them with the cup, which the Cossacks bring home.

== Production Team ==
- Director: Volodymyr Dakhno
- Screenwriter: Volodymyr Kapustyan
- Composer: Boris Buyevsky
- Animators: Serhiy Dyozhkin, V. Yemelyanova, Adolf Pedan, Mark Draytsun, Nina Churilova, Oleksandr Lavrov, Mykola Bondar, Mykhailo Tytov, Oleksandr Viken, Volodymyr Dakhno, Elvira Peretyatko
- Cinematographer: Anatoliy Havrylov
- Sound Engineer: Leonid Moroz
- Editor: Tadeush Pavlenko
- Film Director: Ivan Mazepa
