= National Legend of Ukraine =

Award of the President of Ukraine

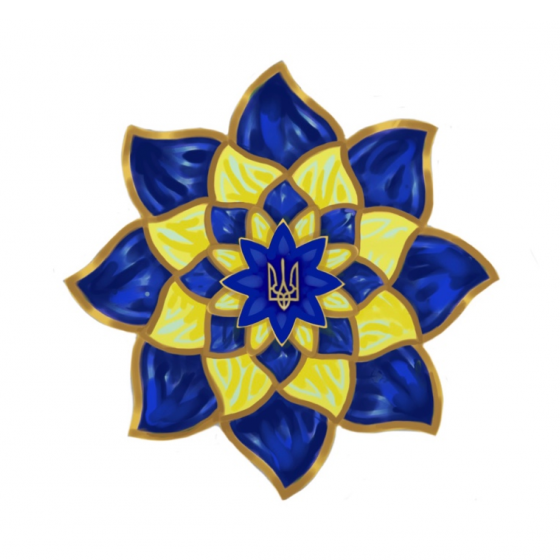
- Type: Award
- Awarded for: "significant contribution to the development of the national economy, science, education, culture, art, sports, healthcare, as well as for active charitable and public activities."
- Presented by: President of Ukraine
- Eligibility: Citizens of Ukraine, foreigners and stateless persons
- Status: Active
- Established: 14 July 2021
- First award: 20 August 2021
- Final award: 23 August 2023

Highlights
- Total awarded posthumously: 6
- Total recipients: 25

The title of National Legend of Ukraine is a state award of Ukraine granted to individuals viewed as having made significant contributions to Ukrainian culture, sports, sciences, or society through public activities. It was founded by a presidential decree by Volodymyr Zelenskyy on 14 July 2021, and first awarded on 20 August 2021. The award's establishment was part of broader celebrations of the 30th anniversary of Ukrainian independence that occurred throughout 2021. It was designed by Ukrainian jeweller Valeriia Huzema.

== Awarded individuals ==
: Awarded posthumously

Name	Date awarded	Notes
Oleg Blokhin	20 August 2021	Football striker and manager.
Ivan Marchuk	20 August 2021	Painter. Previously awarded Shevchenko National Prize.
Olena Potapova	20 August 2021	Ballet master and choreographer. Previously awarded People's Artist of Ukraine and People's Artist of the USSR.
Sofia Rotaru	20 August 2021	Singer. Previously awarded People's Artist of the USSR and Hero of Ukraine.
Yurii Rybchynskyi	20 August 2021	Poet, dramatist, and singer. Previously awarded People's Artist of Ukraine and Hero of Ukraine.
Myroslav Skoryk	20 August 2021	Composer. Previously awarded People's Artist of Ukraine and Hero of Ukraine.
Myroslav Vantukh	20 August 2021	Choreographer. Previously awarded People's Artist of Ukraine and Hero of Ukraine.
Anatolii Babichev	20 August 2022	Train conductor.
Ihor Bedzai	20 August 2022	Naval officer and pilot. Also awarded Hero of Ukraine and Order of Bohdan Khmelnytsky.
Hanna But	20 August 2022	Teacher.
Ihor Ivasykov	20 August 2022	Firefighter.
Tata Kepler	20 August 2022	Volunteer and restaurateur.
Maria Prymachenko	20 August 2022	Naïve art painter, embroiderer, and ceramicist. Previously awarded Shevchenko National Prize.
Andriy Shevchenko	20 August 2022	Football striker and manager. Previously awarded Hero of Ukraine.
Anatoliy Solovianenko	20 August 2022	Operatic tenor. Previously awarded People's Artist of the USSR, People's Artist of Ukraine, and Shevchenko National Prize.
Andrii Svyst	20 August 2022	Neurosurgeon and volunteer.
Olha Svyst	20 August 2022	Pediatrician and volunteer.
Albina Deriugina	23 August 2023	Rhythmic gymnastics coach.
Fuminori Tsuchiko	23 August 2023	Japanese volunteer and café owner.
Iryna Huk	23 August 2023	Volunteer.
Dmytro Kotsiubailo	23 August 2023	Lieutenant of the Armed Forces of Ukraine. Also awarded Hero of Ukraine.
Volodymyr Letenko	23 August 2023	Pipeline engineer.
Taras Petrynenko	23 August 2023	Singer. Previously awarded People's Artist of Ukraine.
Andrii Sirko	23 August 2023	Neurosurgeon.
Andriy Tsaplienko	23 August 2023	War correspondent and journalist.
Ihor Poklad	22 August 2024	Composer. Previously awarded the People's Artist of Ukraine and Hero of Ukraine.
Oleh Korosteliov	22 August 2024	General designer. Previously awarded the Hero of Ukraine and Order of Merit.
Olga Kharlan	22 August 2024	Two-time Olympic gold medalist fencer.
Vitalii Khmel	22 August 2024	Thoracic surgeon.
Ivan Lukashevych	22 August 2024	Brigadier General of Military Counterintelligence of the Security Service of Ukraine.
Iryna Yurchenko	22 August 2024	Conductor at Ukrzaliznytsia.
Oleksandr Dubovyk	22 August 2024	Painter, graphic artist, monumental artist and honorary member of the National Academy of Arts of Ukraine.
Howard Graham Buffett	22 August 2024	American businessman, philanthropist, and Ukraine's largest private donor.
Oleksandr Usyk	22 August 2024	Olympic gold medalist and world champion boxer. Previously awarded the Order of Liberty and Order of Merit.
Sergei Parajanov	22 August 2024	Ukrainian-Armenian film director and screenwriter.
Nina Matviienko	22 August 2024	Singer. Previously awarded the People's Artist of Ukraine and Hero of Ukraine.
