= Taras Petrynenko =

Ukrainian singer (born 1953)

Taras Petrynenko PAU, Shevchenko National Prize laureate
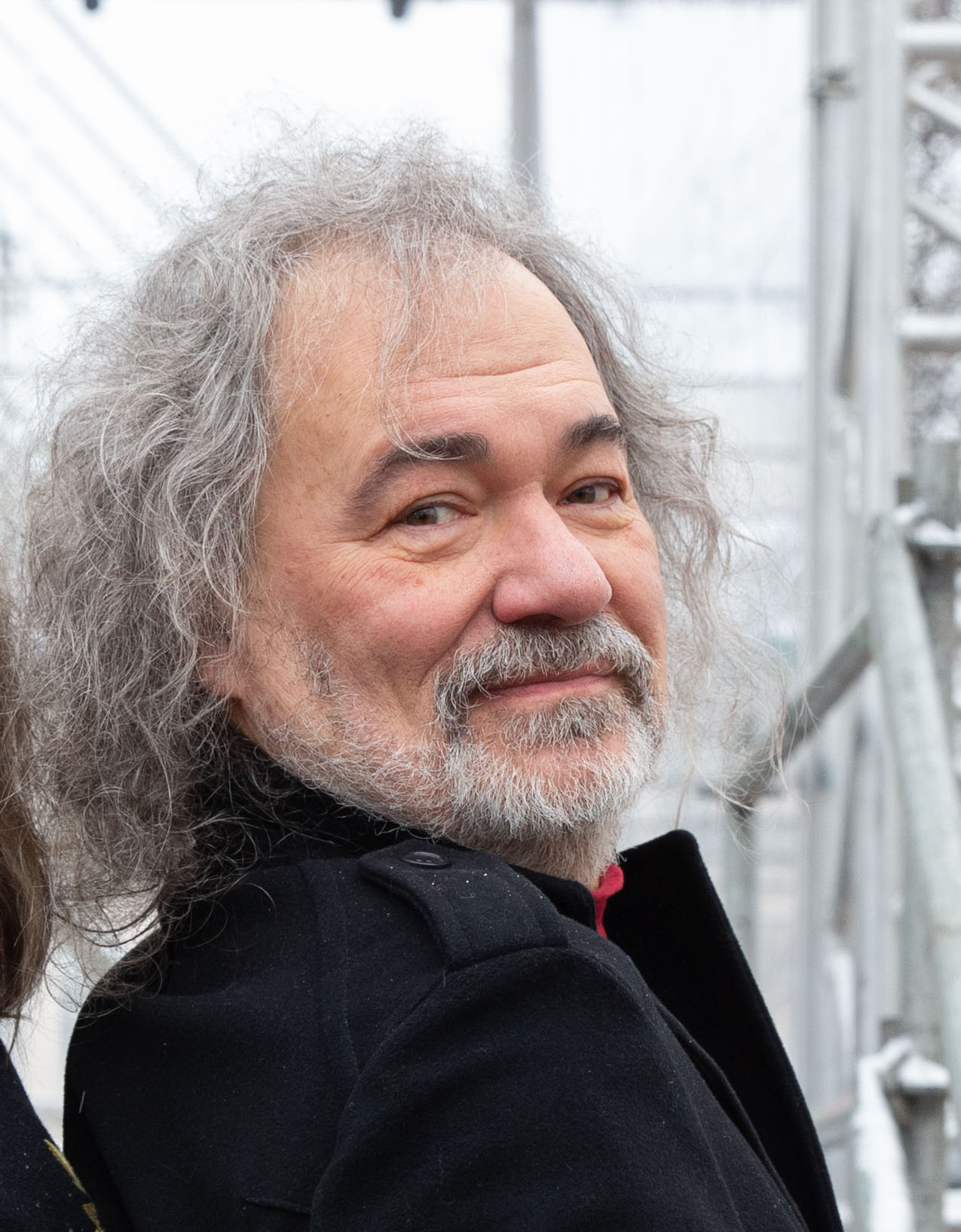
- Petrynenko in 2018

Background information
- Born: 10 March 1953 (age 73); Kyiv, Ukrainian SSR, Soviet Union
- Genres: Pop; rock
- Occupations: Vocalist; musician; arranger
- Instrument: Guitar
- Years active: 1969–present

Taras Harynaldovych Petrynenko (Ukrainian: Тарас Гаринальдович Петриненко, born 10 March 1953) is a Ukrainian musician, People's Artist of Ukraine.

== Background ==
His musical career started in 1969 after his performance on the dance floor with the group Eney, which consisted of students from the music school named after Mykola Lysenko. In 1970 the band debuted on television and almost two years was the undisputed leader of the Ukrainian rock music.

In 1971, Taras created the new group Dzvony, which in 1974 merged with the publicly banned Eney.

After serving in the army Petrynenko was the leader of famous group Mriya, but after they were banned to perform their own songs (particularly «a song about the song»), he with the group Magic Guitars emigrated to Russia. Since 1982 year Petrynenko with the ensemble Red Poppy-Flowers from Tula that at that time consisted exclusively out of the Ukrainian musicians. Here he recorded his first Russian language hits: Dimmed away stars, Pereletnaya ptitsa, I soon come back, but after a short time returned to Ukraine.

In 1991, Petrynenko began to record for the Audio Ukraine album Lord, have mercy on us, which was completed only two years later. The reason for that was the breakup of the band Hrono as the accompanying musicians simply did not return from the foreign tour. But this did not reflect on the quality of the album and by the results of 1993 it was the best in Ukraine.

In 1995, Taras for some time anchored the central television program Kolyskova dlia doroslykh. In the summer of 1997 on «Tavria games - VI» Petrynenko received the All-Ukrainian Prize in music and mass shows, the Golden Firebird, in the nomination the Living Legend.

At the year-end the company Nova Records released the third solo album of Petrynenko Liubov moya, in planning finally to publish the previous one as well. In 1999 for the personal contribution in the development of the national culture and art and the significant artistic achievements, the solo-vocalist of the concert-creative organizations Kyivschyna, Taras Petrynenko was awarded the title of the People's Artist of Ukraine.

In 2003, the brand Atlantic classified Tarasa Petrynenko to group of rock musicians and issued a collection of his songs as the series Rock Legends of Ukraine.

In the autumn 2004 Taras actively participated in the Orange Revolution, where on the Independence Square in Kyiv he has performed his songs. In 2013-2014, Taras Petrinenko actively participated in the Revolution of Dignity, where he performed his songs many times. In August 2023, he was awarded the title of National Legend of Ukraine by President Volodymyr Zelenskyy.

== Most famous works ==
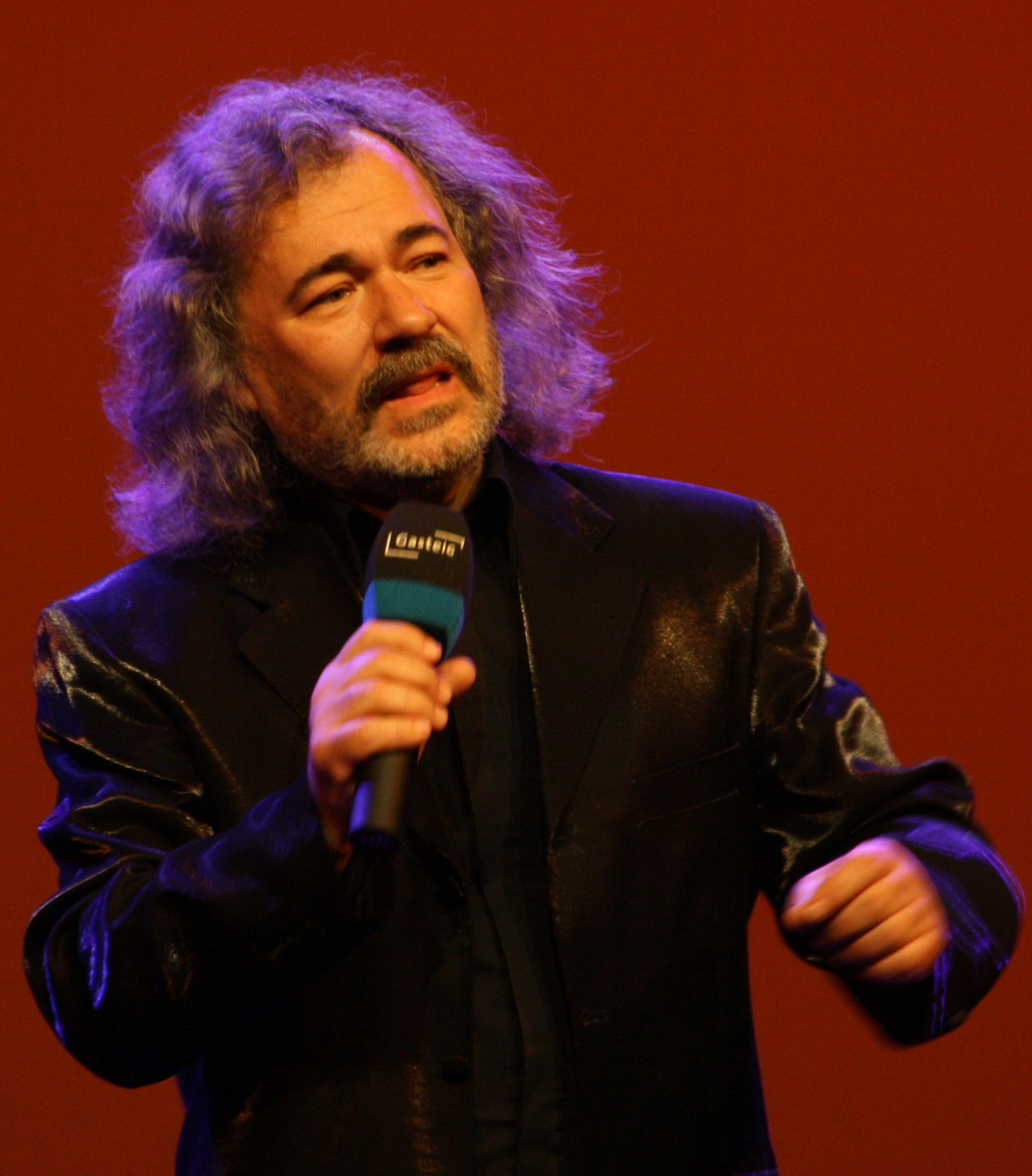
Performing in Munich, Germany

Ukraine
Дороги іншої не треба,
Поки зорить Чумацький Шлях.
Я йду від тебе і до тебе
По золотих твоїх стежках.

Україно, Україно!
Ти зоря наших надій
Вірне серце твого сина
я кладу тобі до ніг.

(Translation of Ukraine)
Another road is unnecessary
Until the Milky Way shines(Chumak's Way)
I walk from you and towards you
On your golden pathways

Ukraine, oh, our Ukraine
You are the star of our hopes
The loyal heart of your native son
I lay it now, right at your feet
