= Iryna Hurvych =

Soviet Ukrainian animator and screenwriter

Iryna Borysivna Hurvych (30 June 1911 - 30 March 1995) was a Soviet Ukrainian animator and screenwriter, Honored Art Worker of the USSR (1973).

== Life ==
Iryna Hurvych was born on June 30, 1911, in the town of Letychiv, Podil Province (now Khmelnytsky Region). From 1934, after graduating from the Kyiv Art Institute, Hurvych worked at the Kyiv Studio of Feature Films. Later she became the artistic director of the Creative Association of Artistic Animation "Kyivnaukfilm". Hurvych was a member of the Communist Party of the Soviet Union (CPSU) since 1947.

As an animation director Iryna Hurvych brought up many talented masters of animation. In 1960, she invited young artists, former architects Volodymyr Dakhno, David Cherkassky and Mark Draitsu, to become animators in The Adventures of Pepper, the first animated film by the creative association. There were no special institutions for learning a new profession at that time, so Hurvych as a senior specialist passed on the knowledge to younger ones, and they invented many new ones and later became known all over the world.

Iryna Hurvych died on 30 March 1995.

== Awards ==
"How Women Sold Men" (1972):

- 1974 - II "World Festival of Animated Films in Zagreb" (Yugoslavia): Special Jury Prize
- 1974 - International Animated Film Festival (New York, USA): Honorary Diploma

== Filmography ==
=== Director ===
- The Adventures of Pepper (1960)
- The Queen's Companion (1962)
- The Hare and the Hedgehog (1963)
- Lelechenya (1964)
- Green Button (1965)
- Evil Egg Smasher (1966)
- Anti Aircraft gun (1967)
- The Legend of the Flaming Heart (1967)
- Scarecrow (1968)
- The Tale of the Moonlight (1968)
- Whale and Cat (1969)
- Mars XX (1969)
- Crane (1970)
- About the Striped Elephant (1971)
- Strange Kitten (1971)
- How Women Sold Men (1972)
- The Adventures of the Giraffe (1973)
- Warm Bread (1973)
- Heather honey (1974)
- Salute (1975)
- How Men Learned Women (1976)
- Why a donkey has long ears (1977)
- Night Captains (1978)
- Cradle of the World (1979)
- Once I Came Home (1981)
- Guerrilla Snow Maiden (1981)
- Confusion (1982)
- Parcel from Bombay (1983)
- Lullaby (1984)
- Game (1985)
- Gavrosh (1986)
- White Arena (1987)
- Oh, where are you going? (1988)
- Nedokolisana (1989)

=== Scriptwriter ===
- The Tale of the Moonlight (1968)
- Mars XX (1969)
- How Women Sold Men (1972)
- How Men Learned Women (1976)
- Once I Came Home (1981)
- Guerrilla Snow Maiden (1981)
- Lullaby (1984)
- Oh, where are you going? (1988)
- Nedokolisana (1989)
