= The Meeting (1984 film) =

Soviet science fiction animated short film

The Meeting (Russian: «Встреча», romanized: Vstrecha) is a 1984 Soviet animation science fiction short film, produced by Ukrainian film studio Kievnauchfilm. The film tells the story that an alien is sent to Earth to investigate whether humans believe the probability of the arrival of Aliens on the planet. The alien, disguised as a man in formal attire, has a conversation with a fisherman on the topic in a log cabin, and then draws the conclusion that humans don't believe such probability. However, the fisherman turns out to be another disguised alien who comes to Earth studying the same issue in the end. The film was directed by Mikhail Titov, and its screenplay was written by V. Zayats.
