= Anatoliy Havrylov =

Ukrainian cinematographer (1932–2021)

Merited Culture Worker Anatoliy Havrylov
- Анатолій Гаврилов
- Born: Anatoly Mikhaylovich Gavrilov; 3 August 1932; Kyiv, Ukrainian SSR, Soviet Union
- Died: 16 May 2021 (aged 88); Kyiv, Ukraine
- Occupation: cinematographer
- Awards: Shevchenko National Prize

Anatoly Mikhaylovich Havrylov (Ukrainian: Анатолій Михайлович Гаврилов; 3 August 1932 – 16 May 2021) was a Soviet and Ukrainian cinematographer. He won the Shevchenko National Prize in 1988 for the Cossacks cartoon series. Havrylov was a Merited Culture Worker of Ukraine (2010).

== Biography ==
Anatoliy Havrylov was born on August 3, 1932, in Kyiv, Ukrainian SSR (now Ukraine).

In addition to his work on the "Cossacks" cartoon series beginning in 1967, some of his best-known works are the 1976 "Delo poruchaetsya detektivu Teddi", the 1969 "The Man Who Knew How to Work Miracles" ("Chelovek, kotoriy umel tvorit chudesa"), and the 1971 "The Wizard Oh" ("Volshebnik Okh").

=== Education ===
In 1967, Anatoliy Havrylov entered the Gerasimov Institute of Cinematography in Moscow.

In 1969, he began study at the National University of Theatre, Film and TV in Kyiv.

=== Career ===
In 1950, Havrylov became an assistant to the film studio camera operator in the Kievnauchfilm and in 1955 worked as an assistant of the camera operator of the animation department of Kievnauchfilm.

Between 1967 and 2008, Havrylov was the camera operator of the Kievnauchfilm and its successor, Ukranimafilm.

In 1988, Anatoliy Havrylov became a laureate of the Shevchenko National Prize of Ukraine, awarded for his work with film director Volodymyr Dakhno and character artist Eduard Kirych on the cartoon series, "Cossacks" about Zaporozhian Cossacks.

Between 1992 and 1995, he worked as a camera operator of cartoon studio "Borysfen".

From 1996 to 2021, Havrylov was a teacher at the National University of Theatre, Film and TV in Kyiv.

Havrylov was a member of the Ukrainian Association of Cinematographers.

Anatoliy Havrylov died in Kyiv on May 16, 2021, at age 88.
