= Vitalii Khmel =

Ukrainian military thoracic surgeon

- Віталій Хмель
- Born: Vitalii Volodymyrovych Khmel
- Other names: Rivas (Рівас)
- Occupation: Military thoracic surgeon
- Awards: Order of Danylo Halytsky; National Legend of Ukraine

Vitalii Volodymyrovych Khmel (Ukrainian: Віталій Володимирович Хмель) is a Ukrainian military thoracic surgeon, captain of the medical service of the Armed Forces of Ukraine, a participant in the Russian-Ukrainian war.

== Biography ==
He received his Candidate of Medical Sciences degree in 2021.

Currently, he serves as a resident thoracic surgeon at the Main Military Medical Clinical Center (Central Clinical Hospital) of the State Border Guard Service of Ukraine.

During the large-scale Russian invasion of Ukraine, he performed more than 100 highly complex operations on wounded servicemen and saved the lives of more than 50 defenders during evacuation flights. In December 2023, together with a senior colleague and under the supervision of sappers, he performed a unique and highly complex emergency operation. At the time, an unexploded mine from an under-barrel grenade launcher was lodged in the chest of a wounded soldier. The surgery was successfully completed, and the soldier's life was saved.

== Awards ==
- Order of Danylo Halytsky (29 April 2024)
- National Legend of Ukraine (21 August 2024)
