= Tamara Huselnykova =

Ukrainian architect (born 1940)

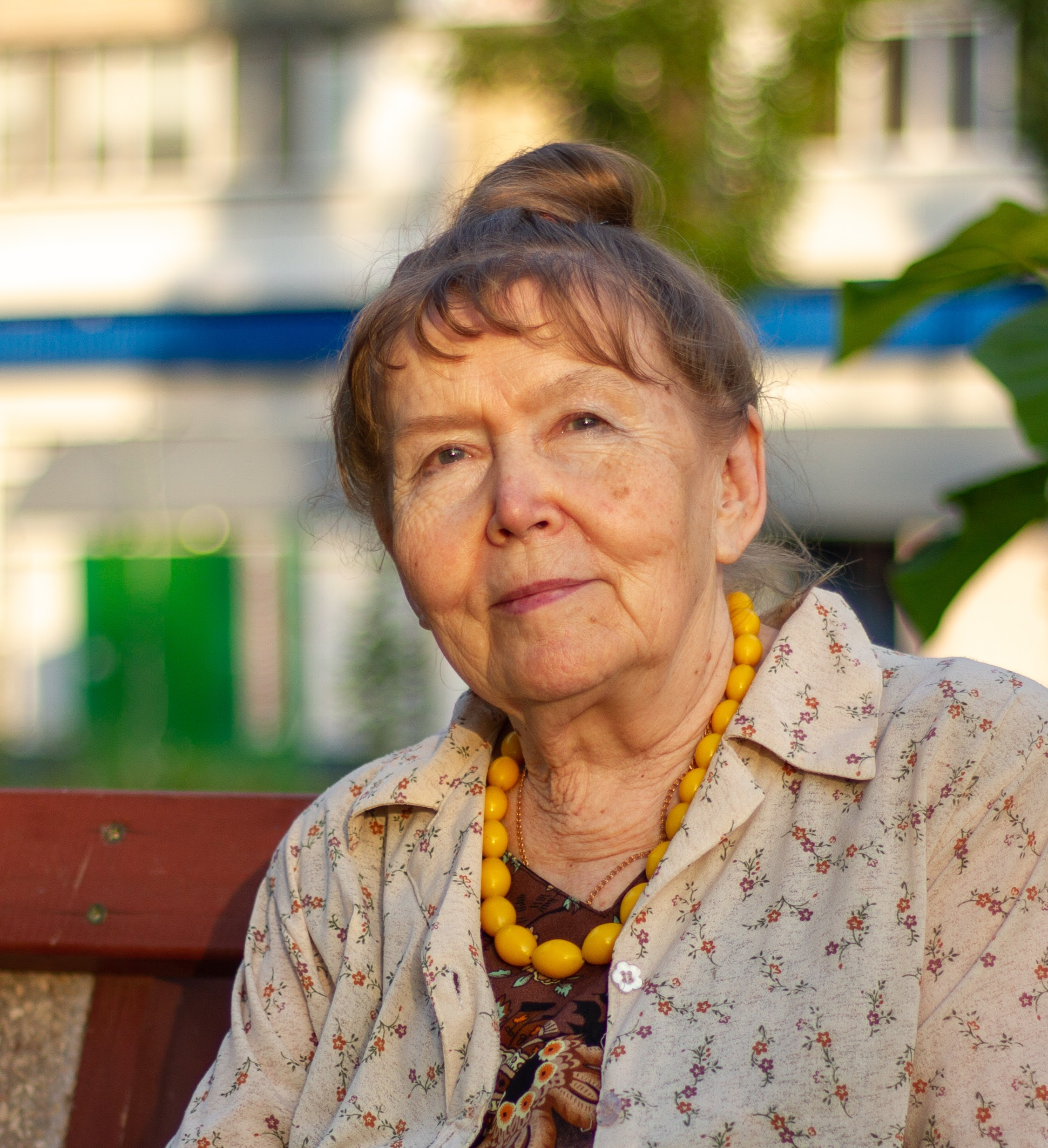
- Tamara Huselnykova in 2018
- Born: September 23, 1940 (age 85); Borzya
- Occupation: Architect

Tamara Huselnykova (Ukrainian: Гусельникова Тамара Валентинівна, born 23 September 1940, Borzya, Chita Oblast, RSFSR) is a Ukrainian architect-restorer.

== Life and career ==
In 1969, she graduated from the Kyiv National University of Construction and Architecture.

From 1965 to 1994, she worked in the Ukrainian Specialized Scientific and Restoration Production Department ("Ukrproektrestavratsiya").

The laureate of the Shevchenko Prize in 1981 — together with Shorin, Ozerny, Semernyov, Steshin, Ivanov, Khlopynska, Cherednychenko, Keranchuk — for the creation of the Museum of Shipbuilding and the Fleet.

Designer of restoration projects for the following structures:

- The Lutheran Church in Odesa - an architectural landmark dating from 1897;
- the rotunda with terraces - an architectural element of the former church complex in Voznesensk, Mykolaiv Oblast - an architectural landmark dating from 1837;
- the Kripatsky and Ochakiv Gates with ramparts and the Moscow Gate with a bastion in Kherson - an architectural monument - 1780;
- St. Catherine's Cathedral in Kherson with the crypt of Potemkin, an architectural monument - 1786;
- the house of the commander-in-chief of the Black Sea Fleet and Ports (Mykolaiv Museum of Shipbuilding and the Fleet) - an architectural monument - 1792;
- the complex of the Pokrovsky Cathedral in Okhtyrka, Sumy Oblast - architectural monument - 1784;
- the pantheon in Rozumivka, Luhansk Oblast (General Razumovsky Museum - architectural monument of the first half of the 19th century);
- Olha Kobylianska Chernivtsi Drama Theatre in Chernivtsi.

== See also ==
- Women in architecture
