= Ihor Poklad =

Ukrainian composer (1941–2025)

Hero of Ukraine Ihor Poklad
- Ігор Поклад
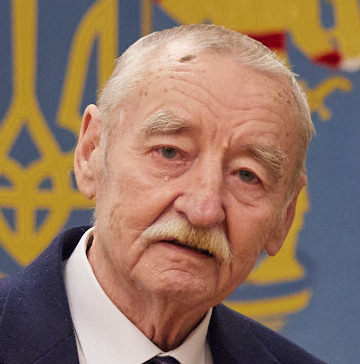
- Poklad in 2021
- Born: 10 December 1941; Frunze, Kirghiz SSR, Soviet Union
- Died: 9 July 2025 (aged 83); Vorzel, Ukraine
- Occupation: Composer
- Known for: Cossacks
- Spouse: Svitlana Poklad
- Awards: Shevchenko National Prize; Hero of Ukraine; National Legend of Ukraine

Ihor Dmytrovych Poklad (Ukrainian: Ігор Дмитрович Поклад; 10 December 1941 – 9 July 2025) was a Ukrainian composer. He wrote songs that became classics and have been performed by famous Ukrainian singers, such as "The Magic Violin" performed by Nina Matviienko. He later turned to scores for theatre and films. He was honoured as People's Artist of Ukraine and Hero of Ukraine, among others.

== Life and career ==
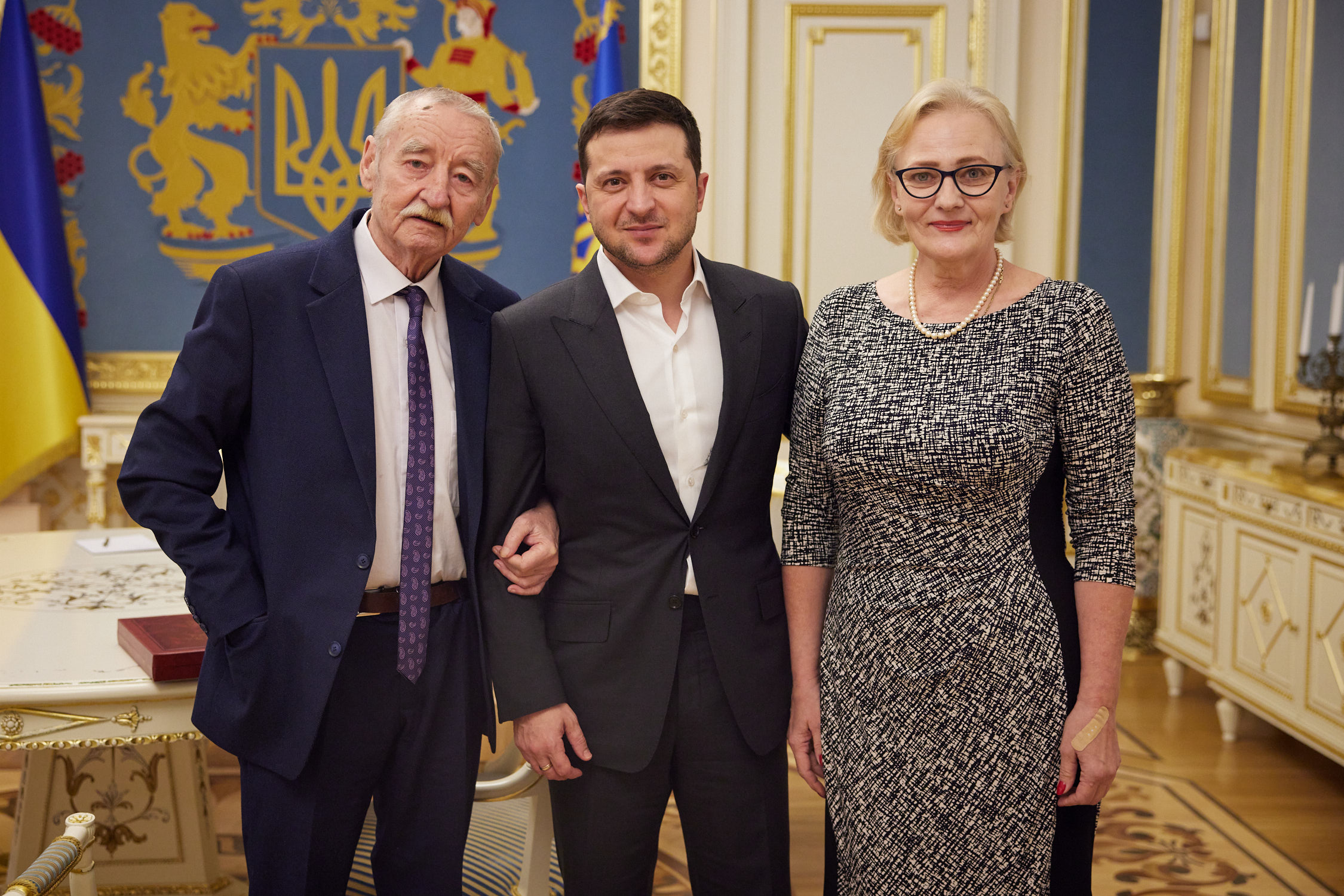
Poklad and his wife Svitlana with Volodymyr Zelenskyy in 2021

Born on 10 December 1941 in Frunze, Kirghiz SSR (present-day Bishkek, Kyrgyzstan) in the family of a military serviceman, after World War II, Poklad with his family moved to Ternopil where he finished high school and a music school. After 1957 he continued his music studies in Kyiv, at the Glière Institute and Kyiv Conservatory, graduating in 1967. Poklad started off his career in the Academical Ensemble of Song and Dance of the Internal Troops of Ukraine.

Already during his studies, between 1965 and 1968, Poklad worked as artistic director of the all-female Mriya vocal-instrumental ensemble and began to compose songs, such as "The Song Will Not Get Lost" to lyrics by Borys Oliynyk. During the 1960s and 1970s he created over 150 popular songs in co-operation with authors including Oliynyk, Yuriy Rybchynskyi, whom he met in the army orchestra, Vadym Kryshchenko, Dmytro Lutsenko, and Oleksandr Vratariov. Poklad's songs were performed by prominent singers such as Nina Matviyenko, Sofia Rotaru, Vasyl Zinkevych, Nazariy Yaremchuk, Ruslana, Tamara Gverdtsiteli, Muslim Magomayev, Yuri Gulyayev, Iosif Kobzon, Rashid Behbudov, Tamara Miansarova and others. Several songs became great hits around the Soviet Union.

Starting from the 1970s, Poklad mostly created music theatre, television and films. He composed the musical Wedding in Malynivka for the Odesa Operetta Theater. It was successful and also played on many Soviet stages. He wrote scores for 27 films and several stage productions, as well as a number of documentaries and animated films. He was a member of the National Union of Composers of Ukraine, and participated in many cultural projects.

Poklad was married to Svitlana. He underwent surgery in 2014. During the Russian invasion of Ukraine in 2022, he and his wife lived in a basement in Vorzel for several weeks.

Poklad died aged 83, on 9 July 2025.

== Music ==
Poklad's most prominent compositions combined Ukrainian folk aesthetics with rhythms and instruments of contemporary popular music, in particular big-beat, rock and disco. Some of his more than 150 songs are considered iconic, including "Green Maple" which won him recognition, "The Magic Violin" performed by Nina Matviienko, "Oy letily dyki husy" (Wild geese flew), "Song about the Mother" and "Zacharuy" (Enchant). His later works include the musical Wedding in Malynivka, music for animated films Cossacks and Eneida, the rock opera Herod, and the film score The Witch of Konotop.

== Awards and honours ==
Poklad was a laureate of the Shevchenko National Prize in 1986. He was honoured as a Merited Culture Worker of Ukraine in 1989, a People's Artist of Ukraine in 1997, as a Hero of Ukraine in 2021, as a National Legend of Ukraine in 2024.
