= Cat and Rooster =

Ukrainian folk tale

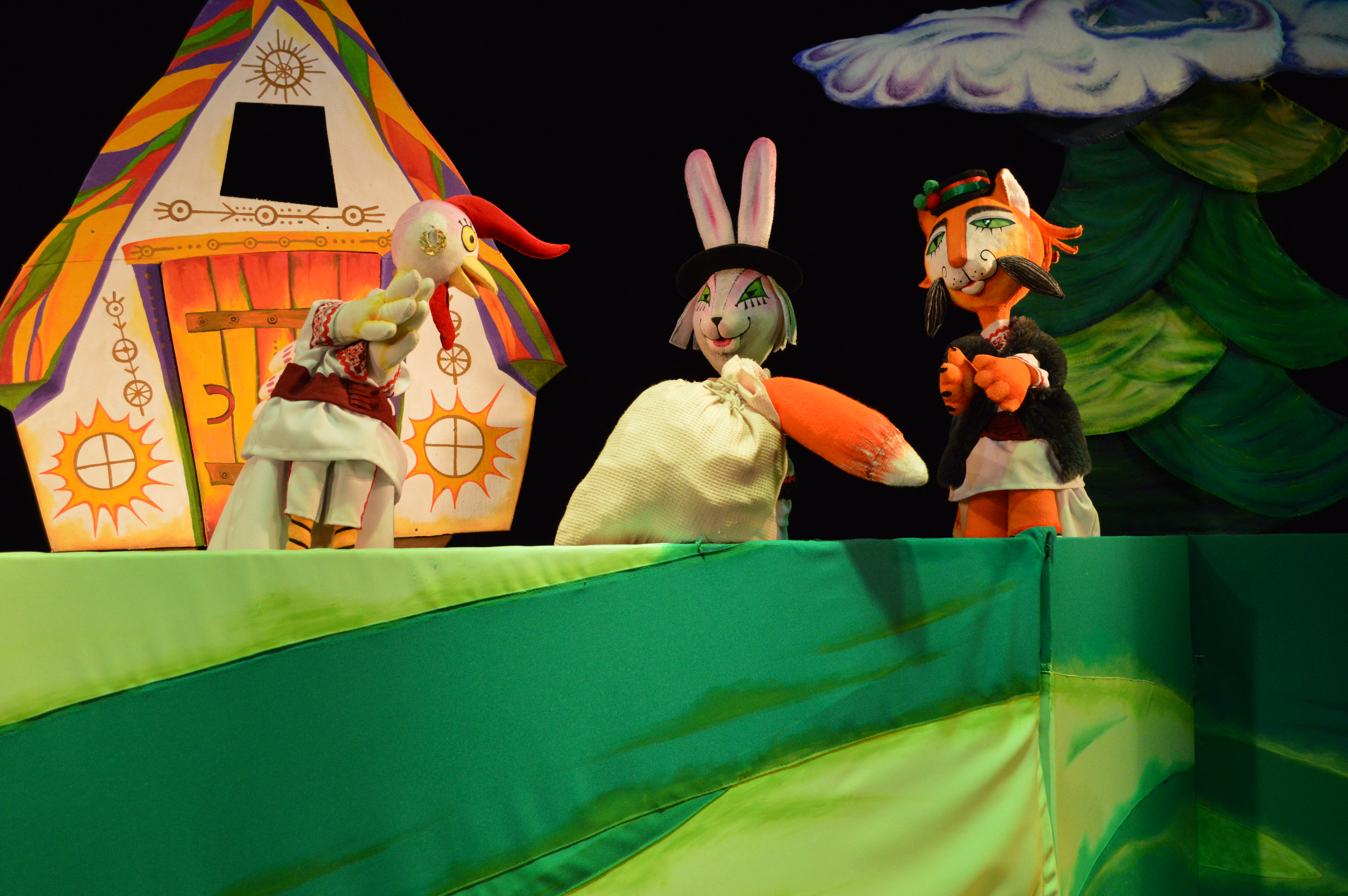
- Cat and Rooster

Folk tale
- Name: Cat and Rooster
- Also known as: Котик і Півник
- Region: Ukraine

"Cat and Rooster" (Ukrainian: «Котик і Півник», romanized: Kotyk i Pivnyk) is a Ukrainian folk tale and fable about a friendship between a cat and a rooster, and a fox who wants to eat the rooster.

== Plot ==
Cat (a cat) and Rooster (a rooster) were friends and lived together in the same house. Making music together, Cat played violin while Rooster sang. During the day, Cat would hunt while rooster would guard and take care of the house. Before leaving, Cat always gave Rooster strict orders not to let anyone else in the house, and not to go out alone, to which Rooster always agreed. After Cat left, Rooster would lock the door until Cat returned.

One day, Fox (a fox) came by Cat and Rooster's house and sought to trick Rooster. Looking in the window, Fox checked to make sure that Cat was not home. When Cat was gone, Fox shouted to Rooster that it had grain and water, but Rooster did not come out. With its first attempt unsuccessful, Fox waited until nightfall, then scattered grain on the ground under the window so that Rooster could see it in the morning. Fox then hid behind a bush to wait.

The following morning when Rooster woke up and saw the grain scattered outside. Rooster thought that it could quickly eat the grain before anyone including Cat saw. Fox waited to attack. When Rooster unlocked the door and opened it to eat the grain, Fox grabbed Rooster and carried it off. While being carried away, Rooster called for Cat to rescue it. Cat heard, but could not rescue Rooster in time, but did grab its violin and followed Fox.

At Fox's house, Fox told its children to boil water to cook Rooster and not to let anyone in while Fox was away. While Fox was away, Cat began playing its violin outside the window of Fox's house. Hearing the music, Fox's children unbolted the door and one by one came out of the house following the sound. One by one, Cat captured each and put them into a sack.

Having captured all of Fox's children, Cat tied the sack with Fox's children to a tree, then entered Fox's house to rescue Rooster. Cat and Rooster left Fox's house, and after that, Rooster listened to Cat.

== In popular culture ==
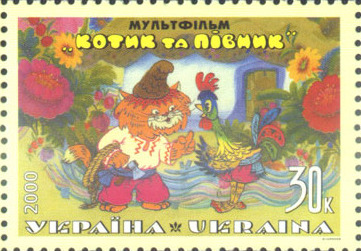
Cat and Rooster, postage stamp, national postal service of Ukraine, Ukrposhta, 2000

=== Adaptations ===
- A children's opera composed by Kyrylo Stetsenko (b. May 12, 1882 - d. April 29, 1922).
- A 1991 Ukrainian animation entitled "Котик та Півник" (Kotyk ta Pivnyk / Cat and Rooster), created by Kyivnaukfilm / Ukranimafilm, written and directed by Alla Grachyova.
- A poem by Natalya Zabila.
