= Kyrylo Stetsenko =

Ukrainian composer and conductor (1882–1922)

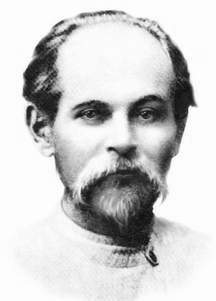
- Stetsenko in c. 1911–1922

Background information
- Born: May 12, 1882; Kvitky, Russian Empire (now Ukraine)
- Died: April 29, 1922 (aged 39) Vepryk, Ukrainian SSR, Soviet Union
- Genre: Classical
- Occupations: Composer; conductor; teacher; priest
- Instruments: Voice; piano; harmonium

Kyrylo Hryhorovych Stetsenko (Ukrainian: Кирило Григорович Стеценко; May 12, 1882 – April 29, 1922) was a prolific Ukrainian composer, conductor, critic, and teacher. Late in his life he became a Ukrainian Orthodox priest and head of the Music section at the Ministry of Education of the short-lived Ukrainian People's Republic.

== Biography ==
=== Early life and education ===
Kyrylo Stetsenko was born in Kvitky, in the land of Cherkashchyna, in Ukraine. His father, Hryhoriy, was a painter of icons and was known around for painting churches in nearby villages. His mother, Mariia, was the daughter of a deacon in the same village. Kyrylo was eighth of eleven children.

When Kyrylo Stetsenko was aged 10, his maternal uncle Danylo Horyanskyi took him to study at the Saint Sophia Church School, where the boy was enrolled for five years, from 1892 to 1897. The young boy lived with his uncle in Kyiv, only returning home to his parents during the summer. However, since his family was poor, the boy had to work during this "vacation", and his mother would spend the money that he earned on new clothes for him.

During his studies at the school, Stetsenko sang in the school choir and after three years, he already conducted the group. The boy also learned how to play the harmonium and the piano. At age thirteen, wrote his first composition: I Will Always Praise the Lord for choir.

=== Kyiv Theological Academy and Seminary ===
Finishing his school education in 1897, Stetsenko began to attend the Kyiv Theological Academy and Seminary. Many of his original choir works composed made during this period.

An important milestone in his development as a composer was his acquaintance with Mykola Lysenko, which later grew into a friendship. Stetsenko first met the Ukrainian composer in 1899 and became part of Lysenko's choir as a singer and an assistant-conductor. The young composer was greatly honoured when, during the opening ceremony of the monument to Ivan Kotliarevsky in Poltava, Lysenko's choir performed Stetsenko's composition Burlaka. Mykola Lysenko would introduce Stetsenko to his circle of intellectuals saying "This is who will replace me after my death. Among those people were Mykhailo Starytsky, Lesya Ukrainka, Vasyl Stefanyk, Mykhailo Kotsiubynsky, Olena Pchilka, Volodymyr Samiylenko, Mykola Arkas, Ivan Steshenko, Hnat Khotkevych, and many others.

Completing his studies in 1903, Kyrylo Stetsenko decided to work as a music teacher, critic, church conductor and composer, rather than immediately becoming a priest.

=== Russian Empire ===
The composer's life was constantly affected by political events. Stetsenko was complicit in the publication of his own choral arrangement of the Ukrainian national anthem without Russian censor approval in 1911. The printer (A. Chokolov) took the blame fully on himself refusing to implicate Stetsenko, and as a result was sentenced to death. The Russian authorities could not prove Stetsenko's complicity, and he was exiled from Kyiv. He managed to return to the city only to leave one year later due to political and economic pressures. In 1911, urged by his uncle, Stetsenko became an Orthodox priest. Financial security, however, came at a price. The composer was required to serve in an obscure village in south-western Ukraine, far from the cultural life of Kyiv. There, in his self-imposed exile, Stetsenko weathered the political storm of World War I.

=== After 1917 Revolution ===
Kyrylo Stetsenko returned to Kyiv with the outbreak of the Russian Revolution of 1917. When the Ukrainian People's Republic was declared, Stetsenko was made head of the Music Section in the Ministry of Education. He created two national choirs. One choir was led by composer Oleksandr Koshyts toured Europe and North America to promote Ukraine as an independent nation. Stetsenko led the other choir, touring Ukraine to promote national unity.

When the Bolsheviks took over Ukraine in 1920, the Koshyts choir was stranded abroad while Stetsenko's choir was disbanded by the new Communist government.

Stetsenko left Kyiv to work in a parish in the village of Vepryk, south of the city. The language of this parish was solely Ukrainian and in 1921, he became one of the founders of the Ukrainian Autocephalous Orthodox Church. In Vepryk he founded a choir and theatre where he was performed on stage. The villagers referred to Stetsenko as the "bright Father".

As political repressions were renewed against Ukrainians, famine and disease began to spread. In spring 1922 Stetsenko died of typhus while tending to the sick during an outbreak of the disease.

== Family ==
His daughter, Dora Kuzmenko, was an opera singer in her native Ukraine. She escaped capture by the Soviets during WWII and lived in a Displaced Persons camp in Austria for a number of years before immigrating to United States. She died in Syracuse NY in the 1960s.

His grandson, Kyrylo Stetsenko, is a violinist and composer in Ukraine. He provides information about his grandfather.

== Works ==
Evensong
Lyrics by Volodymyr Samiylenko. Performed by Benjamin Butterfield (tenor) and Albert Krywolt (piano)

And you abandoned
Lyrics by Oleksandr Oles. Performed by Pavlo Hunka (bass-baritone) and Albert Krywolt (piano)

Oh a Village Can Be Seen
Lyrics by Levko Lepkyi. Stetsenko's arrangement performed by the Choir of Leningrad radio and television

In his works and activity, Stetsenko continued the national focus in Ukrainian music, that was started by Mykola Lysenko. Stetsenko composed over 30 solo vocal works to the words by Ukrainian poets Taras Shevchenko, Ivan Franko, Lesya Ukrainka, Pavlo Hrabovsky, Oleksandr Oles and others. He wrote 42 art songs, over 100 sacred and secular choral pieces, including two liturgies and a requiem, and music to a dozen stage works. His Art Songs have been recorded by renowned British Bass Baritone Pavlo Hunka.

Stetsenko's greatest and most well-known works were written a few months before the end of his life. His last work was the panakhyda written in memory of his teacher and friend Mykola Lysenko.

Among Stetsenko's arrangements is the song Ой видно село (Oh a Village Can Be Seen), written by Ukrainian Sich Riflemen officer Levko Lepkyi during the First World War. Stetsenko's version of the song sung by fighters of the Red Ukrainian Galician Army became a popular wedding and army song in Ukraine under the Soviet rule. Since 2022 it has been performed by the Ensemble of Song and Dance of the Armed Forces of Ukraine.

=== List of major works ===
- Choral works
  - church pieces (2 liturgies, 1 pankhyda)
  - cantatas
  - choruses a cappella and with piano accompaniment
  - arrangements of Ukrainian folk songs.
- Plays
  - Proposing to a Potter's daughter by Hryhorii Kvitka-Osnovianenko
  - What Thyrsus rustled about by Spyrydon Cherkasenko
  - Buval'shchyna by A. Velysovskyi
- Operas (incomplete)
  - Polonianka
  - Karmaliuk
  - Haidamaky
- Theatre works
  - Ifigenia in Tauridia after a drama by Lesya Ukrainka
  - music to the poem Haidamaky by Taras Shevchenko
- Children's operas
  - Ivasyk-Telesyk
  - The Fox, the Cat, and the Rooster
- Numerous children's songs.

== Legacy ==
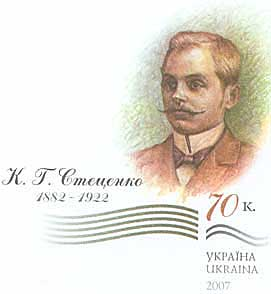
Stetsenko featured on a Ukrainian postage stamp.

In 1982 in celebration of the 100th anniversary of Kyrylo Stetsenko's birth, Stetsenko's house in Vepryk was transformed into a museum of the composer, with an exhibition of what was in there during his life. Besides this, the church where the composer worked was also revived. Stetsenko's grave was fancied up with a large stone monument to the composer placed next to it.

== See also ==
- List of Ukrainian composers - see other Ukrainian composers of the same period
