= The Magic Violin =

The Magic Violin (Ukrainian: «Чарівна Скрипка», romanized: Charivna skrypka) is a folkloric song of Ukraine, also known for the first line in Ukrainian: "Сіла птаха", lit. '"A Bird sat down"'. The song was composed in 1971 by Ihor Poklad to lyrics by the poet Yuriy Rybchynskyi.

Both met during their duty in the army in 1968, and together wrote musical hits like "Two Wings", "The Magic Violin", "Still Waters", "Wild Geese", "Is it Possible?", and many others. From 1973, Poklad composed for the Theater, including the composition of operettas. Rybchynskyi, whose mother also wrote poetry, has dedicated his life to the study of Ukrainian folklore. Both received many national honours.

== Lyrics ==
Ukrainian

Сіла птаха білокрила на тополю,
Сіло сонце понад вечір за поля.
Покохала, покохала я до болю
Молодого, молодого скрипаля.

Покохала, зачарована струною,
Заблукала та мелодія в гаю.
В гай зелений журавлиною весною
Я принесла своє серце скрипалю.*

Йшла до нього, наче місячна царівна,
Йшла до нього, як до березня весна.
І не знала, що та музика чарівна
Не для мене, а для іншої луна.

Покохала, зачарована струною,
Заблукала у березовім гаю,
І понесла журавлиною весною
В гай зелений своє серце скрипалю.

Ukrainian Latin alphabet

Sila ptakha bilokryla na topoliu,
Silo sontse ponad vechir za polia.
Pokokhala, pokokhala ya do boliu
Molodoho, molodoho skrypalia.

Pokokhala, zacharovana strunoiu,
Zablukala ta melodiia v haiu.
V hai zelenyi zhuravlynoiu vesnoiu
Ya prynesla svoie sertse skrypaliu.

Yshla do noho, nache misiachna tsarivna,
Yshla do noho, yak do bereznia vesna.
I ne znala, shcho ta muzyka charivna
Ne dlia mene, a dlia inshoi luna.

Pokokhala, zacharovana strunoiu,
Zablukala u berezovim haiu,
I ponesla zhuravlynoiu vesnoiu
V hai zelenyi svoie sertse skrypaliu.

English

Over a Poplar tree, a White winged bird sat down,
The sun at the sunset hid behind the fields.
Of a Young man, a Young fiddler,
I felt in love, felt in love until I got pain.

He made me love him with his magical string,
But that melody, in the grove got lost
And in this Little forest in the spring of cranes,
I, fiddler, gave you my heart.

Like a moon Princess I walked to him,
Towards him I was going, like the spring to March.
I didn't know this magical music,
Wasn't for me, but to other girl.

He made me love him thru his magical string,
But in the birch tree forest got lost,
And in the spring of the cranes,
In the green grove, to the fiddler gave my heart.

=== Translation ===
The original song text has been translated to Spanish by Fabián Abdala Marzá, a university teacher from Kyiv dedicated to promote the diffusion of Ukrainian song to the Spanish-speaking world.

== Symbolism ==
Like many of Ukrainian songs, "The Magic Violin" contains symbols in its text:

=== птах (Bird) ===
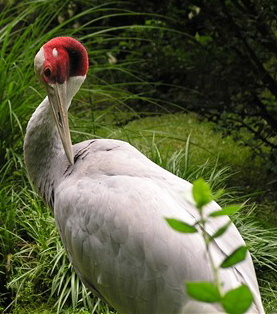
Sarus crane

Birds represent messengers, with good or bad news; to the tree of the world or the tree of life, the creation of universe, the origin of life (thru the egg); birds connect two worlds ( and in the case of aquatic birds, three): earth and sky; they symbolize sometimes the elements, in their case air, and this comes in all parts and places. Some birds, overall fabulous, symbolise dreams, destiny, fate and luck.

=== Білий (White) ===
A symbol of innocence and joy. It's a sign that one person enters the world of light.

=== ТОПОЛЯ (Poplar) ===
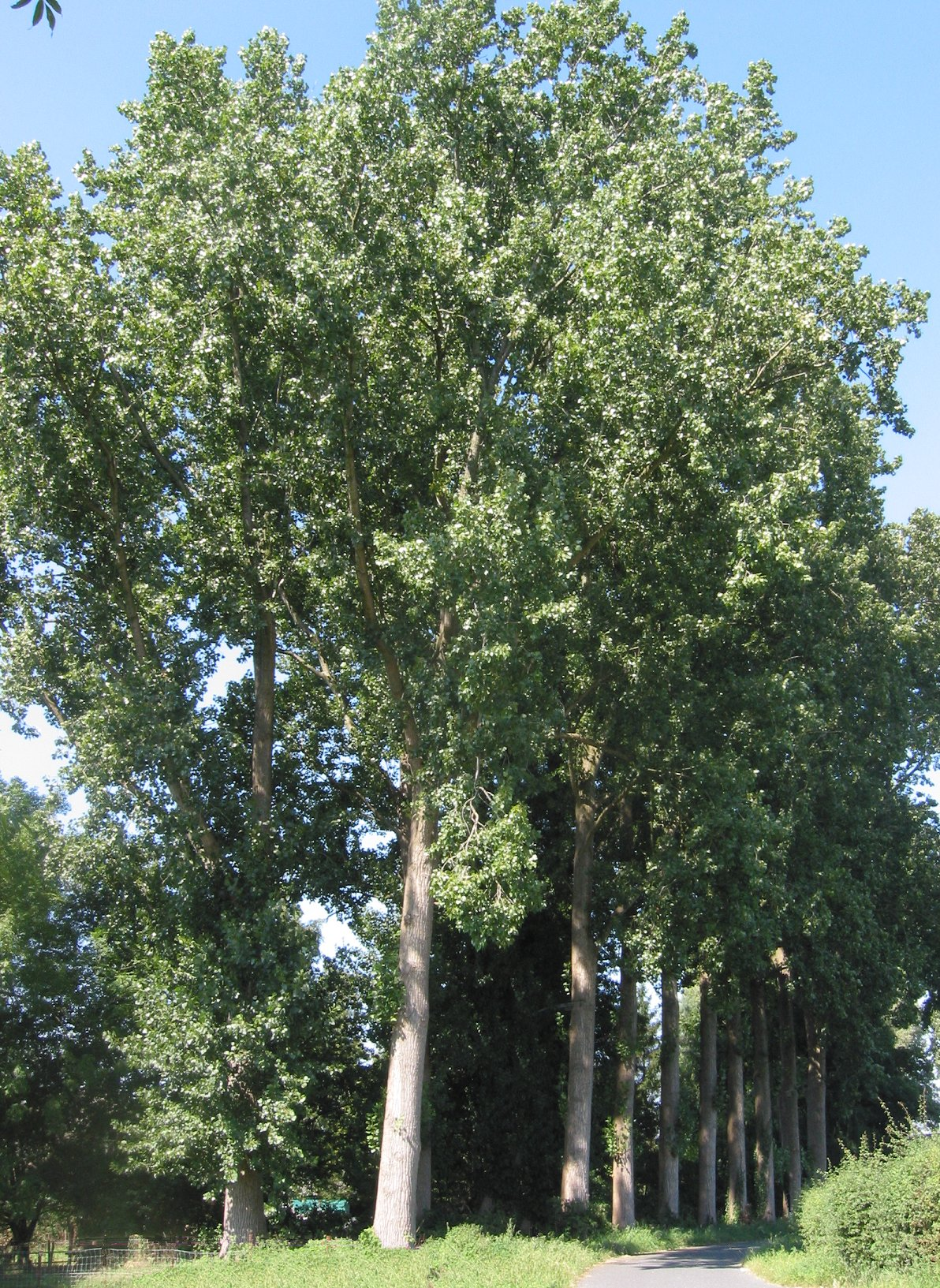
Poplar

Symbolizes the young single maid, the image of a girl waiting for her fate. Represents the fine and delicate nature, beautiful since her youth, and that resists itself to grow, to mature.

=== Сонце (Sun) ===
The source of life, determines all what happens in nature, even to men. It is believed that sun, moon and stars forma the "celestial family", that symbolizes motherhood, marriage.

== Performances ==
"The Magic Violin" has been interpreted by numerous artists in Ukraine and former Soviet Union, such as Lybid Trio (Lydia Mykhaylenko, Natalia Reshetnyk and Valentina Mikhailova), Nina Matviyenko and Taisiya Povaliy.

== In art ==
The song has become known in the world, including in distant foreign countries like Guatemala, where an artist was inspired by the song to make paintings.
