= Felix Sobolev =

Ukrainian documentary filmmaker

Felix Mikhailovich Sobolev
- Соболєв Фелікс Михайлович
- Born: 25 July 1931; Kharkov, Ukraine SSR, USSR
- Died: 20 April 1984 (aged 52); Kyiv, Ukraine SSR, USSR
- Citizenship: USSR
- Occupation: Filmmaker
- Years active: 1960–1984
- Known for: Scientific films
- Movement: Kyiv School of Scientific Cinema
- Awards: Honoured Art Worker of the Ukrainian SSR; USSR State Prize

Felix Mikhailovich Sobolev (1931–1984) was a Soviet Ukrainian documentary filmmaker and a founder and leader of the Kiev School of Scientific Cinema. He received numerous honours for his works, including Honored Artist of the Ukrainian SSR, the MV Lomonosov Prize of the Academy of Sciences of the Soviet Union and the USSR State Prize.

== Biography ==
Felix Sobolev was born on 25 July 1931 in Kharkiv, Ukraine SSR, the son of a worker. He enrolled at the Kyiv National I. K. Karpenko-Kary Theatre, Cinema and Television University and graduated from the acting program in 1953 and the directing program in 1959.

In 1959, Sobolev began working for Kievnauchfilm (a.k.a. the Kyiv Film Studio of Popular Science Films), a state film studio in Kyiv. In 1973, he became artistic director of the studio of scientific cinema at his alma mater.

He was a member of the Union of Cinematographers of the USSR from 1956.

Sobolev died on 20 April 1984 in Kyiv. He was buried in the Berkivtsi City Cemetery.

== Influence ==
In the mid-1960s, Sobolev revolutionized the concept of popular science cinematography. His films The Language of Animals (1967), Do Animals Think (1969) and Seven Steps to the Horizon (1968) were broadly popular, selling out cinemas. His "experiment in the frame" technique made the audience member a witness to experiments proposed by scientists. By the 1970s, Sobolev became disillusioned with the physical sciences, according to his student Alexander Rodnyansky, and began to make films about psychology. Radical for its time, his 1971 film Me and Others made the audience part of an experiment on conformal behaviour and group pressure.

The direction of his work changed with the 1974 short film Biosphere! Time of Awareness, a film essay about the world and a person's place in it. This was followed by the 10-minute film Feat which was shot in close quarters. Both films made intensive use of combined filming and had significant impact on the development of non-fiction films of the time.

Sobolev also influenced a generation of students at the Institute of Theatre Arts and young directors at Kievnauchfilm, where he was the undisputed leader. These included Rodnyansky, Anatoly Borsyuk, Victor Olender, Yosif Pasternak, and Andrei Zagdansky.

In Cinema Art, Sergey Trimbach writes that Sobolev was at the center of one of the two great film movements in Kyiv in the 1960s and 1970s. The other circle was led by Armenian filmmaker Sergei Parajanov, who was censured as his cinematic style opposed Soviet principles. In contrast, Sobolev continued the tradition of Russian intelligentsia, believing in the endless potential of human capabilities, as in his 1978 film Dare, you are talented. Yet, he was not politically motivated, basing Exploded Dawn on the work of a dissident and taking political risks by examining conformity and free thought in Me and Others. Sobolev came into conflict with the party committee over Kyiv Symphony (1982), the last film he completed, which was re-edited seven times to meet political demands and left Sobolev angry and with a damaged reputation.

== Filmography ==
Sobolev's notable film works include:

- In the Fields of the Seven Years (1960)
- To our trainer (1962)
- Singer of the People (1962)
- Mysterious 102 (1964)
- The problem will be solved by cybernetics (1963, director-animator Ivan Barchuk )
- Religion and the 20th Century (1965)
- Exploded Dawn (1965)
- The Language of Animals (1967)
- Seven Steps to the Horizon (1968)
- Do Animals Think (1969)
- Diligent Students (1970)
- Me and Others (1971)
- Good and Ugly (1972)
- Etudes on Morality (1973)
- Walking into the Flame (1973)
- Institute of Hope (1974)
- Biosphere! Time of Awareness (1974)
- The Feat (1975)
- At the origins of mankind (1976, script by E. Dubrovsky)
- Dare, you are talented (1978, written by E. Dubrovsky)
- When Barriers Disappear (1980)
- Kyiv Symphony (1982)
- Your brain is in sight (1985, completed by Victor Olender).

== Awards and honours ==
List of awards and prizes for film work
Year	Festival or award	Country	Prize	Work	Ref
1966	Zonal Film Festival in Leningrad	USSR	Prize and diploma for the first place	Exploded Dawn	
1967	Zonal Film Festival "Prometheus-67" in Tbilisi	USSR	First degree diploma of the Union of Cinematographers of the USSR	Exploded Dawn	
1967	Lomonosov Prize	USSR	First Degree Honorary Diploma	The Language of Animals	
1968	III All-Union Film Festival in Leningrad	USSR	2nd prize and diploma	The Language of Animals	
1968	XXII Congress of the International Scientific Film Association in Rome	Italy	Honorary Diploma	The Language of Animals	
1969	XII Leipzig International Film Festival	East Germany	Golden Dove Prize	The Language of Animals	
1969	Phnom Penh International Film Festival	Cambodia	Silver Cup Prize	The Language of Animals	
1969	Tehran International Children's and Youth Film Festival	Iran	Jury Gold Prize	The Language of Animals	
1969	Belgrade International Conservation Film Festival	Yugoslavia	Honorary Diploma	The Language of Animals	
1969	VII International Science Fiction Film Festival in Trieste	Italy	Grand Prix "Golden Asteroid"	Seven steps beyond the horizon	
1969	X Review of Documentary and Popular Science Films in Leningrad	USSR	First Degree Prize and Diploma	Seven steps beyond the horizon	
1969	II Republican Festival of Children and Youth Films in Odessa	USSR	Diploma	Seven steps beyond the horizon	
1971	Olomouc International Film Festival	Czechoslovakia	Prize and diploma	Me and others	
1971	Budapest International Nature Film Festival	Hungary	Gold medal and diploma	The Language of Animals	
1971	XXV Congress of the International Scientific Film Association in Kiev	USSR	Honorary Diploma	Do animals think	
1971	XIV Leipzig International Film Festival	East Germany	Golden Dove Prize	Do animals think	
1972	Tehran International Educational Film Festival	Iran	Golden Dolphin Prize and Diploma	Do animals think	
1972	USSR State Prize	USSR		The Language of Animals & Do animals think	
1973	VIII Moscow Film Festival in Moscow	USSR	Prize	Walking into the Flame	
1974	IX International Technical Film Competition within the XI UNIATEC Congress in Salerno	Italy	Grand Prix for the development of new filming methods	Biosphere! Time of awareness	
1974	World's Fair in Spokane	US	Diploma and prize	Biosphere! Time of awareness	
1974	TV Association	US	Diploma and prize	Biosphere! Time of awareness	
1976	Olomouc International Film Festival	Czechoslovakia	Grand Prize	Feat	
1977	X All-Union Film Festival in Riga	USSR	Grand Prize	At the origins of humanity	
1977	Venice International Film Festival	Italy	Grand Prize	At the origins of humanity	
1986	XIX All-Union Film Festival in Alma-Ata	USSR	Main prize in the category "Popular science film"	Your brain is on target	

== Legacy ==
F. Sobolev Street in Kyiv was named for him, with a memorial plaque at 17 Franka Street. Another memorial plaque at 19 Chervonotkatska Street in Kyiv states: Here during the years 1964–1981 one of the geniuses of Ukrainian and world cinema Felix Sobolev (1931–1984) lived and worked here.

The Kievnauchfilm charitable foundation is named for Sobolev. Asteroid 5940 Feliksobolev, discovered in 1981, was named for him.

Sobolev is the subject of the nine-part 1998 documentary series Felix Sobolev, Mission Interrupted (Ukrainian «Фелікс Соболев. Увірвана місія») by his student and colleague Olender and of a film of the 2012 "Native People" series by Yulia Rudenko.
