= Adaptations of Kipling's Just So Stories =

Many adaptations of Rudyard Kipling's Just So Stories have been made in various countries, as cartoons, musicals and a children's opera.

== Cartoons ==
- A 1936 black and white Soviet cartoon of How the Whale Got His Throat.
- A 1938 black and white Soviet cartoon of How the Rhinoceros Got His Skin.
- The Elephant's Child was twice made into a Soviet cartoon by the Soyuzmultfilm studio, in 1936 (The Elephant's Child) and in 1967 (The Elephant's Child).
- The Cat Who Walked by Himself, a Soviet drawn animation screen version created by Aleksandra Snezhko-Blotskaya at Soyuzmultfilm studio in 1968.
- A 1981 stop-motion adaptation of The Beginning of the Armadillos by the Soyuzmultfilm studio.
- A 1983 Marble Arch/Interama/Strengholt Films cel-animated series Just So Stories, adapted from a collection of ten children's stories created by Sheila Graber.
- A 1984 Kyinaukfilm stop-motion adaptation of How the First Letter Was Written.
- The Cat Who Walked by Herself, a 1988 Soviet stop-motion animated feature film based on "The Cat that Walked by Himself" from a film studio Soyuzmultfilm.
- Rudyard Kipling's Just So Stories, a 1992 British animated compilation of twelve of Rudyard Kipling's classic tales, created by Bevanfield Films and BBC, and directed by Timothy Forder.
- Just So Stories, a French-British animated co-production from Les Films de L'Arlequin and Je Suis Bien Content and France 3 was produced in 2008.

== Television ==
- Story Chest: Just So Stories, a 2024 adaptation of some of the stories produced by school's TV company Time Capsule Video Ltd.

== Music ==
- Samuil Marshak's Russian translation of the final poem from The Beginning of the Armadillos was made into a song by Viktor Berkovsky and Moris Sinelnikov. The song became popular after performances by the duet of Sergey Nikitin and Tatyana Nikitina.

== Musicals ==
- Just So, a 1984 musical by Anthony Drewe and George Stiles.

== Operas ==
- The Elephant's Child was made into a children's opera by Daron Hagen in 1996, for the Kings Singers.
