= Kievnauchfilm =

Soviet Ukrainian film studio

- Type: State-owned enterprise
- Industry: Film
- Founded: 1941
- Defunct: 1993
- Fate: Transformed
- Successor: National Cinematheque of Ukraine; Ukranimafilm; National Oleksandr Dovzhenko Film Centre
- Headquarters: Kiev, Soviet Union (Ukraine)
- Products: Animation, TV films
- Owner: Government agencies of UkSSR, Ukraine

The Kievnauchfilm (Russian: Киевнаучфильм) or KyivNaukFilm (Ukrainian: Київнаукфільм), and sometimes translated as lit. Kyiv Science Film, was a film studio in the Soviet Union located in Kiev, Ukrainian SSR and Ukraine. Although it was created in 1941 to produce popular science films, it eventually became best known for its animated films, and remained active in Ukrainian animation for decades.

== Description ==
Its main task was production of popular science films and documentaries covering a broad range of topics. In 1959, Kievnauchfilm (an abbreviation for "Kyiv Science Films"), under Hippolyte Lazarchuk expanded into animation. In addition, it released 342 animated films, a large number of which are still popular today, such as a series about Zaporozhian Cossacks called Cossacks (directed by Volodymyr Dakhno), Adventures of Captain Wrongel series, Doctor Aybolit, and a version of Treasure Island (all three directed by David Cherkassky). The studio's films received numerous awards at international and national film festivals, such as the World Festival of Animated Film in Zagreb for Iryna Hurvych's How Women Sold Men and the Animated Film Festival in New York.

Film director Felix Sobolev (Animals' Tongue, I and Others, Can Animals Think?) and studio Editor-in-Chief Yevheniy Zahdanskyi are considered to be trailblazers and figures of major influence in the documentary field in the former Soviet Union. By 1966 the studio released over 400 films annually.

In 1993 Kievnauchfilm produced Unknown Ukraine: Sketches of Our History, a series of 104 films presenting a comprehensive history of Ukraine.

In 1993 Kievnauchfilm was split into National Cinematheque of Ukraine and Ukranimafilm.

== Reorganization ==
On March 29, 2019, in accordance with the order of the Ministry of Culture of Ukraine No. 256 "On the Reorganization of the State Enterprise "Ukrainian Animation Film Studio", the film studio "Ukranimafilm" was merged with the "Dovzhenko-Center," which became its legal successor.

== Filmography ==
=== Animation ===
- Adventures of Pepper («Пригоди Перця» 1961)
- Cossacks series (1967–1995), director Volodymyr Dakhno.
  - How the Cossacks cooked Kulish («Як козаки куліш варили», 1967)
  - How the Cossacks played football («Як козаки у футбол грали», 1970)
  - How the Cossacks rescued the brides («Як козаки наречених визволяли», 1973)
  - How the Cossacks bought the salt («Як козаки сіль купували», 1975)
  - How the Cossacks became the Olympians («Як козаки олімпійцями стали», 1978)
  - How the Cossacks helped the Musketeers («Як козаки мушкетерам допомагали», 1979)
  - How the Cossacks enjoyed the wedding («Як козаки на весіллі гуляли», 1984)
  - How the Cossacks met the aliens («Як козаки інопланетян зустрічали», 1987)
  - How the Cossacks played hockey («Як козаки в хокей грали», 1995)
- Mykyta the Tanner («Микита Кожум'яка» 1965), directed by Nina Vasylenko, cinematography by Anatoliy Havrylov.
- Ivasyk-Telesyk, puppet animation directed by Leonid Zarubin and written by Yukhym Chepovetskyi, («Івасик-Телесик» 1968)
- Adventures of the Cossack Aeneas («Пригоди козака Енея» 1969)
- The Man Who Could Work Miracles - adaptation of H. G. Wells' "The Man Who Could Work Miracles", director Yefrem Pruzhanskyy, («Людина, яка вміла робити дива» 1969)
- Kotyhoroshko («Котигорошко» 1970)
- How the Hedgehog and the Bear Celebrated the New Year («Як їжачок і ведмедик зустрічали Новий Рік» 1975)
- How the bear was fed («Як годували ведмежа» 1976)
- Musical tales («Музичні казки» 1976)
- Adventures of Captain Wrongel series («Пригоди капітана Врунгеля» 1976–1979), director David Cherkassky
- Adventures of Vakula the Smith («Пригоди кузнеця Вакули» 1977)
- First Whinter («Перша зима» 1978)
- Golden-horned Deer («Золоторогий олень» 1979)
- How the table was carried («Як несли стіл» 1979)
- Kapitoshka - Water Bubble («Капітошка» 1980)
- Once Upon a Time There Were Matrioshkas («Жили собі матрьошки» 1981)
- Alice in Wonderland («Аліса у Дивокраї» 1981)
- Through the Looking-Glass, and What Alice Found There («Аліса в Задзеркаллі» 1982)
- How the First Letter Was Written («Як було написано першого листа» 1984)
- The Meeting («Зустіч» 1984)
- Doctor Aybolit (1984), director David Cherkassky
- Srazhenie (Russian: Сражение - meaning "Battle"; adaptation of Stephen King's short story "Battleground", directed by Mikhail Titov. («Бій» 1986)
- Treasure Island («Острів скарбів» 1988), director David Cherkassky
- Ivasyk-Telesyk cartoon animation directed and written by Alla Hrachova, («Івасик-Телесик» 1989)
- Cat and Rooster - Ukrainian folk tale Cat and Rooster adaptation, Kievnauchfilm/ Ukranimafilm, written and directed by Alla Hrachova («Котик та Півник» 1991).
- The Tree Pans series (1989–1991)
  - The Tree Pans («Три Паньки» 1989)
  - Three Pans Are Housekeeping («Три Паньки хазяйнують» 1990)
  - Three Pans at the Fair («Три Паньки на ярмарку» 1991)

=== Popular science / documentaries ===
- The Blown up Dawn, Взорванный рассвет, 1965, director Felix Sobolev
- Animals' Language, Язык животных, 1967, director Felix Sobolev
- Seven Steps beyond Horizon, Семь шагов за горизонт, 1968, director Felix Sobolev
- Can Animals Think? Думают ли животные? 1970, director Felix Sobolev
- Myself and Others, Я и другие, 1971, director Felix Sobolev
- Indian yogis. Who are they? Индийские йоги — кто они? 1970, director Almar Serebryanikov
- Echo of our Emotions, Луна наших эмоций (1977)
- People and Dolphins, Люди и дельфины (1983), director Volodymyr Khmelnytskyi
- Vavilov's Star, Звезда Вавилова, 1984, director Anatoliy Borsuk, screenwriter Serhiy Dyachenko
- Экспертиза одной сенсации, 1985, (about pseudoscience), director Lev Vdovenko
- A Footprint, Отпечаток, 1985, director Anatoliy Borsuk
- A Man from 6am through Midnight, Человек с шести до полуночи, 1987, (about everyday struggles of a young professional engineer in the Soviet Union), director Andrei Zagdansky
- Interpretation of Dreams, Толкование сновидений, 1989, (Freudian interpretation and "equation" of communism and nazism) director Andrei Zagdansky
- Rauol Valenberg's Mission, Миссия Рауля Валенберга, 1990, director Alexander Rodnyansky

== See also ==
- Cinema of the Soviet Union
- History of Soviet animation
- Cinema of Ukraine
- History of Ukrainian animation
- Dovzhenko-Center
