= Ivasyk-Telesyk =

Ukrainian folk tale / fairy tale

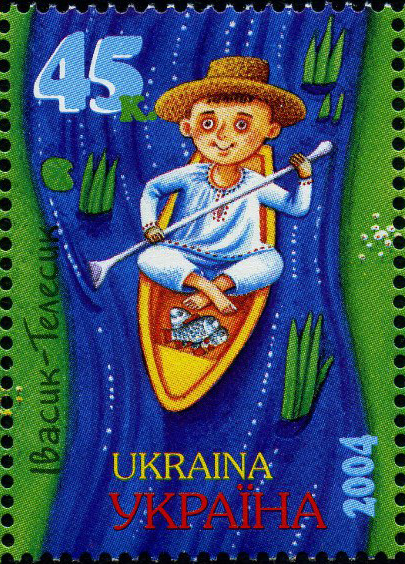
- Ivasyk-Telesyk featured on stamp of Ukraine's national postal service, Ukrposhta, 2004

Folk tale
- Name: Ivasyk-Telesyk
- Also known as: Telesik-Little Stick
- Aarne–Thompson grouping: ATU 327C, "The Devil (Witch) Carries the Hero Home in a Sack" +; ATU 327F, "The Witch and the Fisher Boy"
- Region: Ukraine

"Ivasyk-Telesyk" (Ukrainian: «Івасик-Телесик») is a Ukrainian folk tale in the family of magical tales, fables, or fairy tales. According to Ukrainian folklorist Petro Lintur, the story of Telesyk is popular in Ukraine.

== Plot summary ==
An old man and old woman have no children. Because of this, the old woman asks the old man to carve a log out of a tree so that she can have a son. She places the log in a cradle. The next day, the log turns into a real boy. Since it was carved, it is called Ivasyk-Telesyk.

When Ivasyk-Telesyk grows up, he asks the old man, his father, to make him a boat and an oar so that the boy can fish. By fishing, Ivasyk-Telesyk feeds his parents. Because an evil snake walks along the shore, Ivasyk-Telesyk's mother warns him to only swim to the shore and eat when he hears his mother's voice alone.

The snake attempts to deceive Ivasyk-Telesyk by repeating his mother's words, but the boy hears the difference and does not obey. The snake then goes to the blacksmith to forge another voice for her. Hearing the snake with its new voice forged by the blacksmith, Ivasyk-Telesyk cannot distinguish the snake's voice from his mother's, and thus fooled, swims to shore. Having tricked the boy, the snake then grabs the boy and carries Ivasyk-Telesyk to the snake's home.

At the snake's home, the snake orders its daughter to bake Ivasyk-Telesyk in the oven and to call guests. The snake's daughter tells Ivasyk-Telesyk to sit on a shovel so that she can push him into the furnace. Ivasyk-Telesyk pretends that he does not know how, and asks the snake's daughter to show him herself. When the snake's daughter sits on the shovel to show him, Ivasyk-Telesyk surprises the snake's daughter and pushes her into the oven himself.

When guests come to the snake's house, they eat her baked daughter, not knowing who it really is. When they have finished, from outside Ivasyk-Telesyk tells the guests they have eaten the snake's daughter. The guests and snake try to grab the boy, but he climbs a tree, which the snake and its guests want to chew through in order to get him down. When their attempt fails, they go to the blacksmith to make them iron teeth.

With new iron teeth from the blacksmith, the snake and its guests almost manage to chew through the tree. Seeing the danger, Ivasyk-Telesyk asks a flock of geese flying by to pick him up. Three flocks appear, and one after the other they refuse. Finally, a young goose picks up Ivasyk-Telesyk on its wings, and while struggling to carry the boy's weight, delivers him home.

Once returned home, standing outside, the boy hears his mother counting pies, and asks for one pie for himself. The old man and old woman do not hear his words at first, but then they recognize their son's voice and let Ivasyk-Telesyk into the house. The old woman sees the young goose and thinks of eating it, but Ivasyk-Telesyk tells how the goose saved him. The old man and old woman then feed the goose and give it grain for its journey.

== Analysis ==
=== Tale type ===
The tale is classified as the East Slavic type SUS 327C, F, Russian: Мальчик (Ивась, Жихарко, Лутонюшка) и ведьма, romanized: Mal'chik (Ivas, Zhikharko, Lutonyushka) i ved'ma, lit. 'The Boy and the Witch' (ru), of the East Slavic Folktale Classification (Russian: СУС, romanized: SUS). In type SUS 327C, the witch disguises her voice to lure the hero (a young boy) to her lair; while trying to cook him, the boy dupes her and throws her (or her daughter) in the oven, and he escapes with the help of a flock of swan geese. In type SUS 327F, the boy is on a fishing boat and is tricked by the witch, who altered her voice. In this lens, Petro Lintur suggested that the Belarusian and Russian variants, wherein the young hero is named Telesik, Ivasik or Tereshechka, are "closely linked" to Ukrainian tales of type 327C.

The East Slavic types correspond to two tale types of the international Aarne-Thompson-Uther Index: ATU 327C, "The Devil (Witch) Carries the Hero Home in a Sack", and ATU 327F, "The Witch and the Fisher Boy", which are usual combinations to each other.

A similar Belarusian fairy tale is The Pipilka Son.

=== Interpretation ===
Ukrainian folklorist Viktor Davidyuk explained the meaning of the fairy tale as a cultural lesson about to which family a person belongs. Ivasyk-Telesyk could express belonging by responding to the "mother's voice". This relation indicates that the roots of the fairy tale may lie in the era of matriarchy, when the definition of parentage was relative to the mother. Another possible meaning is a cultural discouragement on revealing the magical meaning of one's words to outsiders.

== In popular culture ==
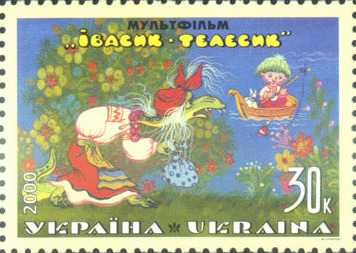
Ivasyk-Telesyk, National postal service stamp of Ukraine, Ukrposhta, 2000

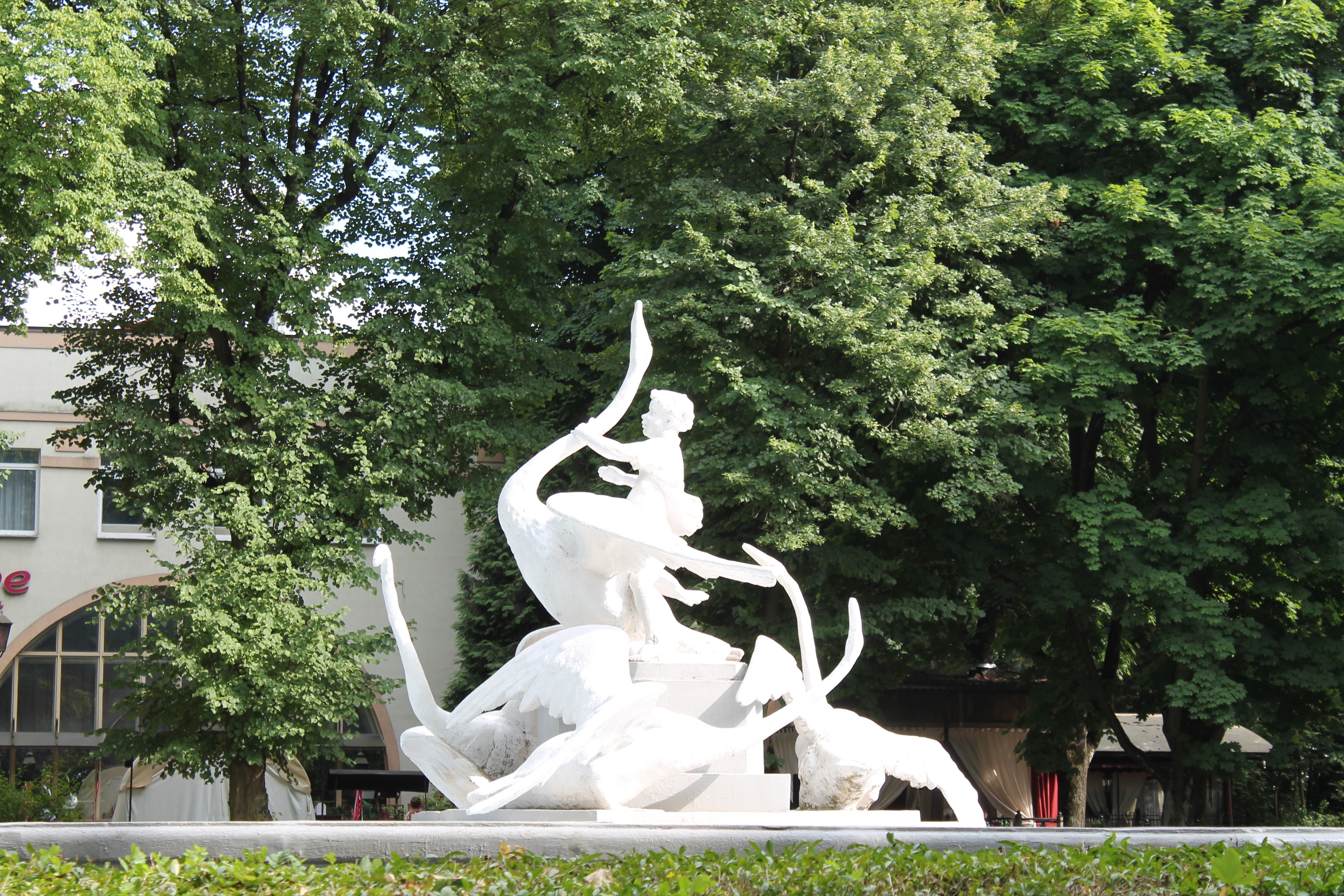
Water fountain statue of Ivasyk-Telesyk in Stryiskyi Park, Lviv, Ukraine

=== Adaptations ===
- A children's opera of the same name composed by Kyrylo Stetsenko (b. May 12, 1882 - d. April 29, 1922).
- Ivasyk-Telesyk (1988): a 1968 puppet animation, created by Kyivnaukfilm animation studio, written by Yukhym Chepovetskyi and directed by Leonid Zarubin.
- Ivasyk-Telesyk (1989): a 1989 cartoon animation, created by Kyivnaukfilm animation studio, written and directed by Alla Hrachova.
- In 2018, the Night Train Theatre Company staged Maria Montague's translation of "Maklena", from the original play "Maklena Grasa" by Mykola Kulish, and in 2019 toured Ukraine. The play references the folk tale "Ivasyk-Telesyk" in the first scene and throughout the play.

=== Statues ===
Water fountain in Lviv, Ukraine's Stryiskyi Park.

== See also ==
- Hansel and Gretel (ATU 327A)
- Hop-o'-My-Thumb (ATU 327B)
- The Magic Swan Geese
- Pinocchio, Italian wooden boy
