= 30th anniversary of Ukrainian independence =

Celebration held from 22–24 August 2021

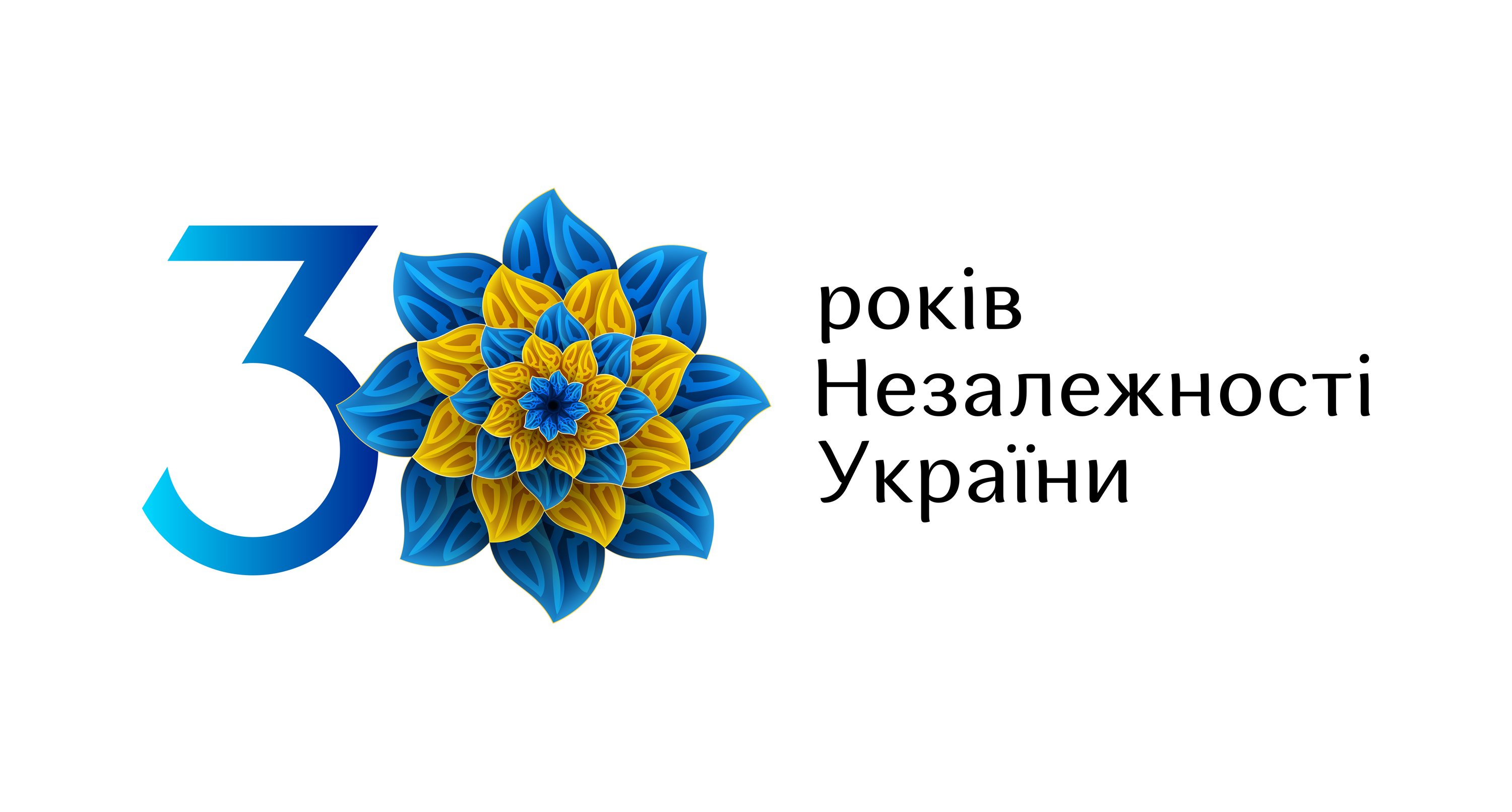
- Native name: 30-та річниця незалежності України
- Date: 22–24 August 2021
- Type: Anniversary
- Budget: ₴100 million (Note: Including infrastructure projects, the budget increases to ₴5.4 billion.)
- Website: Ministry of Culture and Information Policy of Ukraine (Archived)

The 30th anniversary of Ukrainian independence (Ukrainian: 30-та річниця незалежності України, romanized: 30-ta richnytsia nezalezhnosti Ukrayiny) was a celebration of Ukrainian independence held from 22 to 24 August 2021, marking 30 years of Ukrainian independence from the Soviet Union. As part of the celebrations, more than 150 events were held across the country under the auspices of the Ministry of Culture and Information Policy.

== Celebrations ==
As part of the 30th anniversary of Ukrainian independence, more than 150 events were held throughout Ukraine with the official support of Ukraine's Ministry of Culture and Information Policy. Celebrations were held under the slogan of "You are my only one" (Ukrainian: Ти у мене єдина, romanized: Ty u mene yedyna), meant to symbolise the struggle for Ukrainian independence across several generations. Delegations from 30 different countries and international organisations attended the events.

=== 22 August ===
- Unveiling and awarding of the National Legend of Ukraine prize
- Liturgy at Saint Sophia Cathedral, Kyiv with the attendance of Bartholomew I of Constantinople
- "Where we are, there is Ukraine" forum within the Ukraine 30 Forum

=== 23 August ===
- Raising of the flag of Ukraine at the geographic centre of Ukraine in Dobrovelychkivka, Cherkasy Oblast
- Inaugural summit of the Crimean Platform
- Inaugural summit of the Kyiv Summit of First Ladies and Gentlemen
- Performance at the National Opera of Ukraine for leaders of foreign nations

=== 24 August ===
- Kyiv Independence Day Parade, including an artillery salute on Trukhaniv Island and a naval parade in the Dnieper
- Naval parade in Odesa
- Concert by Andrea Bocelli, Tina Karol, and Jamala in Constitution Square
- "Independence is in our DNA" festive show at Olimpiyskiy National Sports Complex
- Extraordinary session of the Verkhovna Rada, where the draft law on the greater coat of arms of Ukraine is adopted

== Other events ==
In addition to the main events of 22–24 August, several events were held throughout 2021 in recognition of Ukraine's 30th anniversary. The Ukraine 30 Forum was founded and organised in honour of the anniversary. Several events honouring veterans of the Russo-Ukrainian War were also held throughout Kyiv, including the March of the Defenders. The Sich-2-30 satellite was planned to be launched in 2021 as part of the revival of the Ukrainian space programme, but its launch was postponed until January 2022 on the decision of SpaceX, the company responsible for launching the satellite.

A series of four commemorative coins (worth ₴5, ₴10, ₴50, and ₴250) were issued by the National Bank of Ukraine as part of celebrations, as well as a singular bullion coin (worth ₴1).

=== Display of the Constitution of Pylyp Orlyk ===
From 16 August to 14 November 2021, the exhibition "Rarities of the Ukrainian Cossack State — Hetmanate of the 17th and 18th centuries: To the 30th anniversary of Ukraine's Independence" (Note: Ukrainian: Раритети Української козацької держави — Гетьманщини XVII—XVIII ст.: До 30-річчя Незалежності України, romanized: Rarytety Ukrayinskoyi kozatskoyi derzhavy — Hetmanshchyny XVII—XVIII st.: Do 30-richchia Nezalezhnosti Ukrayiny) was held at St. Sophia's Cathedral in Kyiv. The exhibition included the original Latin version of the Constitution of Pylyp Orlyk (in particular the constitution's second and third articles) and other historical objects, such as Ivan Mazepa's bulawa and a series of five universals issued by Mazepa between 1687 and 1702.

The display of the Constitution of Pylyp Orlyk was noted by Dmytro Kuleba, Ukraine's foreign minister, as a reminder of Ukraine's ownership of Crimea. In particular, he noted the second article, which established the inviolability of Ukraine's borders, and the third article, which called for the establishment of an alliance with the Crimean Khanate.

"Rarities of the Ukrainian Cossack State" exhibition
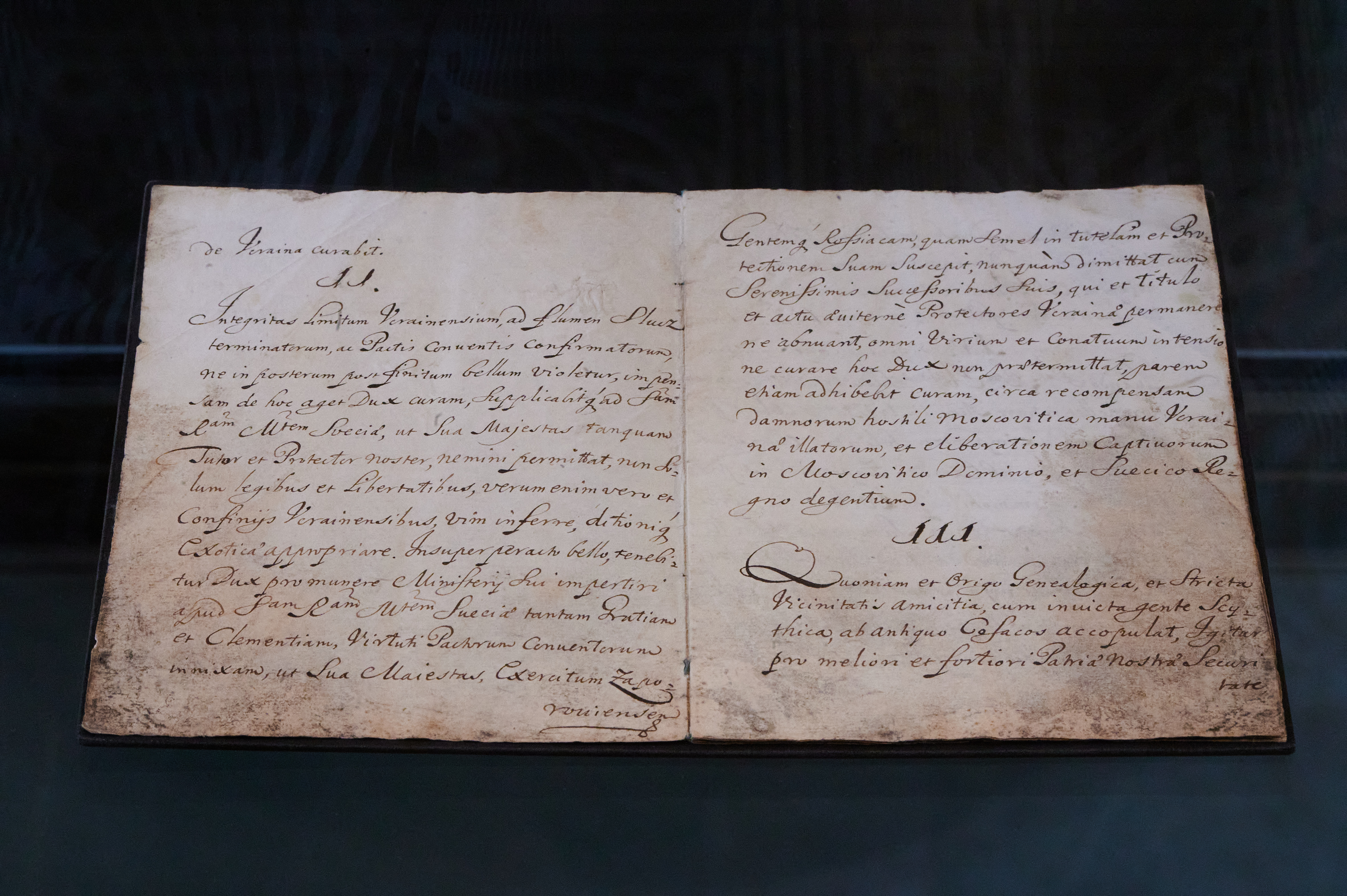
The Constitution of Pylyp Orlyk in Latin

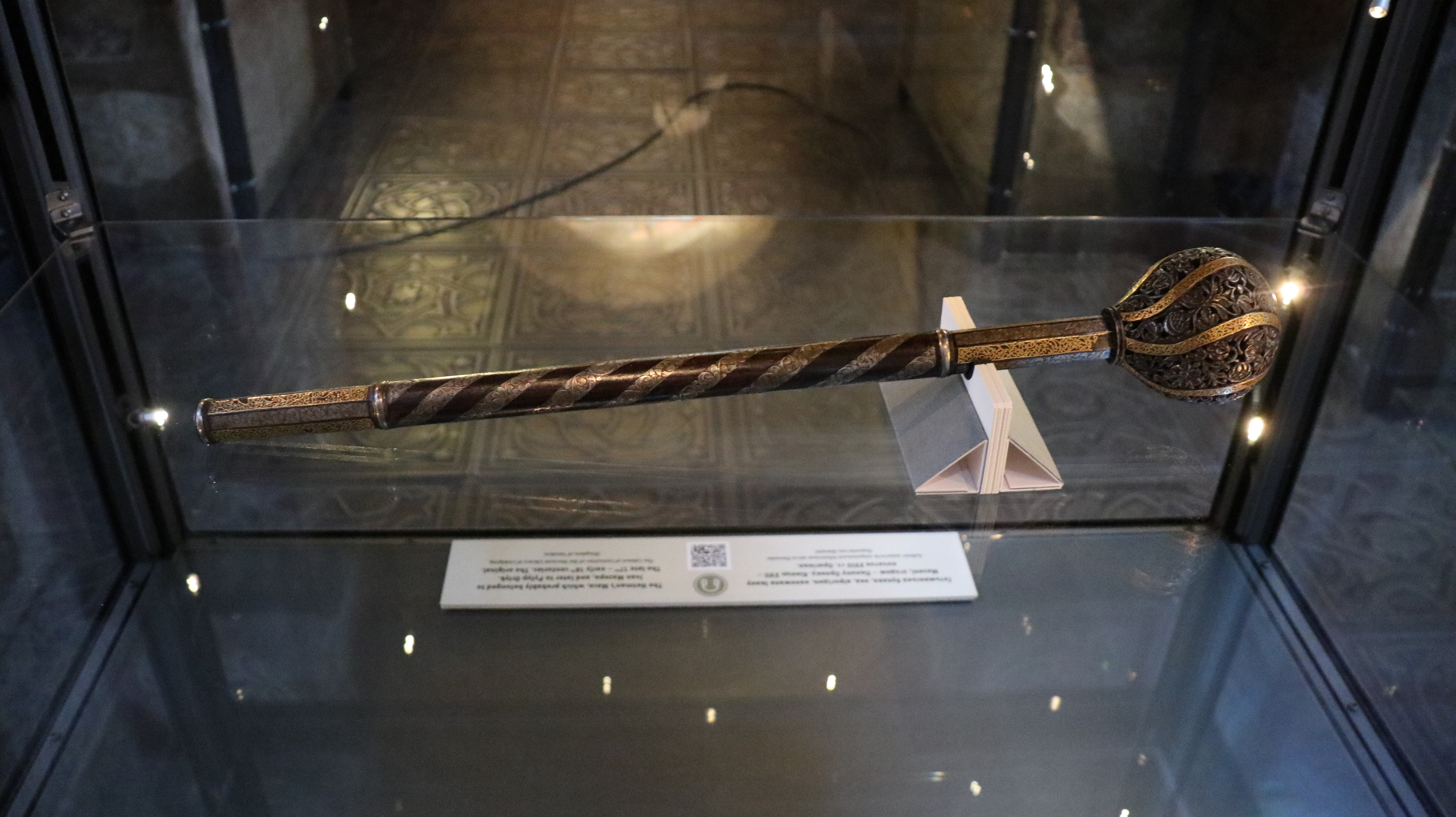
Ivan Mazepa's bulawa

=== Infrastructure construction ===
As part of President Volodymyr Zelenskyy's "Great Construction" programme and the celebrations, several investments in infrastructure were made. Highway M30, a merger of former highways M04 and M12, was established as the longest road in Ukraine, at a length of 1,446.6 km (898.9 mi). It was called the "Road of Unity" (Note: Ukrainian: Дороги Єдності, romanized: Dorohy Yednosti), and underwent major construction in order to increase the highway's capacity to 40,000-50,000. As a result of the construction, the commute time between the western city of Lviv and Ukraine's easternmost Luhansk Oblast is expected to decrease by three hours. Six regional airports (in Dnipro, Kherson, Odesa, Rivne, Uzhhorod, and Vinnytsia) were also modernised, and an the construction of a new building complex for the Okhmatdyt paediatric hospital.

== Cost ==
According to the Ministry of Finance of Ukraine, the total cost of all events planned by the Ukrainian government, as well as infrastructure projects, was ₴5.4 billion. Of the ₴5.4 billion, ₴100 million was spent on the celebrations. Additionally, an exception to the Law of Ukraine "On Public Procurement" was made on 3 June 2021 to allow the purchase of goods and services necessary for the 30th anniversary celebrations through negotiation procedures rather than open auction.
