= National Cinematheque of Ukraine =

Ukrainian film studio

The National Cinematheque of Ukraine (Ukrainian: Національна кінематека України, НКУ) is a Ukrainian film studio that came out of the well-known Kievnauchfilm after the dissolution of the Soviet Union.

== History ==
In the early 1930s, Techfilm, a department specializing in educational films, was opened at the Dovzhenko Film Studio. On 1 January 1941, the department was transformed into a film studio with the same name — Techfilm. In 1942–1944, the studio was evacuated to Tashkent, where educational and propaganda films for the Soviet Army were produced. In 1944, the studio was moved to Kyiv.

In 1954, it was renamed the Kyiv Studio of Popular Science Films (abbreviated — Kyivnaukfilm).

In 1966, a modern studio complex was built at НКУ. It contains several pavilions, a film laboratory, and workshops for artistic and technical animation. At that time, the studio produced more than 400 popular science, cartoon, propaganda, educational and promotional films every year. More than 300 films made at НКУ have been awarded prizes and diplomas at all-Union and international film festivals.

The animated film division was split off from НКУ under the name Ukranimafilm.

Since October 2015, a bankruptcy case has been filed against НКУ.

== Selected films ==
=== Animation ===
- Мова тварин (1967)
- Чи думають звірі? (1970)
- Індійські йоги — хто вони? (Serebrenikov Almar 1970)
- Луна наших емоцій (1977)
- Зірка Вавілова (AnatolIy Borsyuk; 1984)
- Экспертиза одной сенсации (1985)
- Отпечаток (1985)
- Мужчина с шести до полуночи
- Толкование сновидений (1989)
- Миссия Рауля Валенберга (1990)
- Три Паньки на ярмарку (1991)
- Енеїда (1991)
- Як козаки у хокей грали (1995)

=== Popular science/documentaries ===
- Невідома Україна / Unknown Ukraine (1993)
