= Yevhen Malukha =

Ukrainian actor, voice actor, and educator

- Born: July 24, 1961 (age 64); Kyiv, Ukraine
- Occupations: Theatre and film actor; Educator; Announcer; Voice actor; Dubbing director
- Spouse: Svitlana Avtukhova

Yevhen Mykolayovych Malukha; born July 24, 1961, Kyiv) is a Ukrainian actor of theatre and film, educator, announcer, voice actor, and dubbing director.

== Biography ==
Yevhen Malukha was born on July 24, 1961, in Kyiv, Ukraine.

=== Theatrical work ===
- 1982–1985: Actor at the Sumy Theatre for Children and Youth.
- 1985–1994: Actor at the Kyiv Academic Young Theatre.
- 1994–1998: Actor at the Kyiv Variety Theatre, Zoloti Vorota Theatre, and the Kyiv Academic Drama and Comedy Theatre on the Left Bank.

=== Teaching career ===
- 1998–2002: Rhetoric instructor at the Children's Academy of Arts.
- 2000–2009: Lecturer in the Department of Stage Speech at the Kyiv National I. K. Karpenko-Kary Theatre, Cinema and Television University.
- 2004–2009: Announcer for the information broadcasting department of the K1 television channel, including the program Earth in the Porthole as Leonardo Lyuty.
- 2004–2007: Announcer for the Glas television channel.
- Since autumn 2009: Periodically conducts the masterclass "Mastering Your Voice: Diction and Charisma" at the Kyiv-based company Kruhozyr.

== Filmography ==
- Bastion (1983)
- People's Malakhiy (1991)
- Burzhuy's Birthday (1999)
- Right to Defense (2002)
- Farewell to Cairo (2002)
- Little Dancer (2011)
- Beetle (2013)
- Doctor Kovalchuk (2017)
- Ether (2018)
- On the Swings of Fate (2018)
- Dentist (2018)
- Shadow of Love (2018)
- Day of the Sun (2019)
- Plantain (2019)
- Mr. Jones (2019)
- Saga (2020)
- Paradise House (2021)

== Dubbing and voice acting ==
Malukha has provided hundreds of voice roles in Ukrainian and Russian for studios and television channels such as 1+1, ICTV, Le Doyen, and others.

He voiced Professor Kalancha, nine unique characters, and numerous non-unique character lines in the video games S.T.A.L.K.E.R.: Shadow of Chernobyl and S.T.A.L.K.E.R.: Clear Sky, developed by the Ukrainian studio GSC Game World.

Due to his distinctive Ukrainian-language voice work in several iconic films and series, Malukha is sometimes referred to as the "Ukrainian voice of Homer Simpson, Alf, and Dr. House".

In 2023, in collaboration with Ukrainian fan studios "Lifecycle" and "Kachur," he voiced the character "James Elliott" in episodes 2 and 5 of the animated web series Murder Drones.
