= Volodymyr Dakhno =

Soviet and Ukrainian filmmaker (1932–2006)

- Education: Kyiv Civil Engineering Institute
- Occupations: Animator; cartoons director; screenwriter; cinematographer
- Known for: Cossacks; Eneida
- Office: Kievnauchfilm
- Awards: Shevchenko National Prize

Volodymyr Dakhno (Ukrainian: Володимир Авксентійович Дахно; March 7, 1932, Zaporizhzhia – July 28, 2006, Kyiv, Ukraine) was a Ukrainian animator, animation film director and scriptwriter. He was a laureate of the Shevchenko National Prize of Ukraine (1988), and a People's Artist of Ukraine (1996). Dakhno was best known for the animation series Cossacks (Ukrainian: «Козаки») which featured characters who were Zaporozhian Cossacks. He worked at Kievnauchfilm, also translated Kyivnaukfilm, which has since been renamed Ukranimafilm.

Volodymyr Dakhno was born on March 7, 1932, in Zaporizhzhia, Ukrainian SSR (now Ukraine). His father was a colonel and his mother was a librarian; he was described as a "bookish" child who enjoyed drawing. In an interview, he speculated that his upbringing in Zaporizhzhia contributed to his love of humor.

After school he entered the Kyiv Medical Institute but almost immediately, he transferred to the Kyiv Civil Engineering Institute where he studied in the class of prominent Ukrainian architect Joseph Karakis. Relating his study of architecture to his work in animation, Dakhno said (translated):

"It is the ability to create an image and see it in the mind. It is the same as an architect, when drawing the plan of a house, must clearly imagine the whole structure. You can be a talented person, but you cannot create a cartoon without a special vision. The thought, first of all, must be visualized in the director's imagination, and then, if lucky, it will come to life on the screen, become clear to the viewer."

On March 7, 2013, Google released a Doodle in Dakhno's memory on his 81st birthday.

== Filmography ==
Year	English translation	Original title
1967	How Cossacks cooked Kulish	«Як козаки куліш варили»
1969	How Cossacks searched for happiness	«Як козаки щастя шукав»
1970	How Cossacks played football	«Як козаки у футбол грали»
1973	How Cossacks rescued the brides	«Як козаки наречених визволяли»
1975	How Cossacks bought the salt	«Як козаки сіль купували»
1978	How Cossacks became the Olympians	«Як козаки олімпійцями стали»
1979	How Cossacks helped the Musketeers	«Як козаки мушкетерам допомагали»
1984	How Cossacks enjoyed the wedding	«Як козаки на весіллі гуляли»
1987	How Cossacks met the aliens	«Як козаки інопланетян зустрічали»
1991	Eneida	«Енеїда»
1995	How Cossacks played hockey	«Як козаки у хокей грали»

== See also ==
- History of Ukrainian animation
- Kievnauchfilm
- Shevchenko National Prize

== Literature ==
- Юнаков, О. (2016). Архитектор Иосиф Каракис (in Russian). Алмаз. ISBN 978-1-68082-000-3.
