= Shevchenko National Prize =

Ukrainian state award

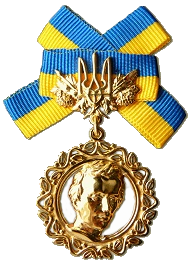
- Award medal
- Awarded for: ...the most remarkable works of literature and arts, publicity and journalism...
- Country: Ukrainian SSR / Ukraine
- Presented by: Government of Ukrainian SSR / President of Ukraine
- Established: 1961
- First award: 1962
- Website: Official website

The Shevchenko National Prize (Ukrainian: Національна премія України імені Тараса Шевченка, romanized: Natsionalna premiia Ukrainy imeni Tarasa Shevchenka; also Shevchenko Award) is the highest state prize of Ukraine for works of culture and arts awarded since 1961. It is named after the inspirer of the Ukrainian national revival Taras Shevchenko. It is one of the five state prizes of Ukraine that are awarded for achievements in various fields.

== History ==
In May 1961 the Soviet Union was honoring on a large scale the memory of Ukrainian Kobzar Taras Hryhorovych Shevchenko. A century from the day of his death became the reason for conducting festive events not only in Ukraine, but throughout the Soviet Union.

Thus, the Communist Party of the Soviet Union used the people's love for the great poet with goals of propaganda for "successes of Lenin National Policy" (such as the Declaration of the Rights of the Peoples of Russia), but it had to consider the national sentiments of Ukrainian people. Such atmosphere contributed to that on May 20, 1961 the Council of Ministers of the Ukrainian SSR issued a resolution "About establishing annual Shevchenko Republican Prize". At the same time there was adopted the Provision on prizes and examples of honoring badges with diplomas for laureates; also there was established a government committee headed by Oleksandr Korniychuk, which consisted along with the party's officials prominent figures of Ukrainian culture. It was awarded to the prominent performers of literature, arts, music, theater, cinematography, architecture, and others.

The first laureates received the Prize on March 9, 1962. They were Pavlo Tychyna (recent speaker of Verkhovna Rada) and Oleksandr Honchar in literature, and Platon Mayboroda in music. As of April 23, 1969 the award was renamed the Shevchenko State Prize of Ukrainian SSR.

In 1992, after the collapse of the Soviet Union, the award was renewed as the State Prize of Ukraine named after Taras Shevchenko.

In September 1999, The President of Ukraine approved the Committee and the Regulations on the National Prize. The award was renamed the National Prize of Ukraine named after Taras Shevchenko. Since then, the Shevchenko National Prize has been awarded each year by a President's decree.

From 1962 to 2018 the award was given to 648 people and eight collective ensembles.

== Statute of the Award ==
Monetary award
Year	Amount (Note: in thousands of hryvnia (previously Soviet roubles))
1962	2.5
2008	130
2009	160
2010	170
2014	260
2015	240
2016	192
2017	240
2018	240
2019	200
2020	200
2021	240
2022	397
2025	484,480
2026	484,480

The National Prize is awarded annually by the order of the President of Ukraine. There are up to five prizes in the following nominations:

- Literature (fiction or artistic literature)
- Literature (non-fiction or documentary and scientifically critical literature)
- Journalism and narrative journalism
- Performing Arts (theatrical, musical, others)
- Other Arts (folk and visual)

A special committee is elected to organize a concourse in three stages. Once decided the names of the candidates are forwarded to the State Committee of Awards and Heraldry that petitions them to the President.

The awarded are paid by the committee an amount the size of which is identified annually by the President. The monetary award of the prize for 2009 was ₴160,000 for each prize. For comparison, in 2008 the prize money amounted to ₴130,000 which was equivalent to $25,000+. The first award in 1962 was given along with 2,500 roubles. The monetary award of the prize in 2010 was confirmed at ₴130,000 which by 40,000 less than the last year (implying that it was ₴170,000). The Party of Regions spokesperson Hanna Herman commented that the funds were awarded only that one that were already on the Shevchenko's Fund]. Shevchenko lived modestly, lived in need, and to buy him out of serfdom the Russian Intelligentsia collected 2,500 roubles - she added.

=== Special conditions ===
The works that seek the National Prize are presented by the Ministry of Culture and Tourism of Ukraine, the Ukrainian National Academy of Science, the Ukrainian Academy of Arts, the Ukrainian artistic unions, and the Ukrainian literally and artistically critical associations. It may be awarded to the citizens of Ukraine as well as foreigners.

The literary and artistic works that reached the third stage can be nominated for the second time, but no more than two times. The special committee accepts all the works for the National Prize starting the following year from August 1 to November 1 of the current year. The collective authors of a presented work cannot exceed three persons, no more than five for a collective of performers. The participants that performed any administrative, organizational, or counseling functions cannot be included among the laureates. The National Prize is awarded to an author or a performer only once in the lifetime.

== List of winners ==
Year	Literature	Literary and art criticism	Journalism and opinion journalism	Music arts	Theater arts	Visual arts	Cinematography
2026	Pavlo Belianskyi, Yuriy Shcherbak	Olesia Avramenko, Serhiy Trymbach, Valeriy Sakharuk, Tetiana Hauk, Olena Hrozovska, Mykhailo Kulivnyk, Kateryna Lisova	Oleh Kryshtopa	Yuliya Tkach	Oksana Dmytriyeva	Nazar Bilyk, Olena Hrom, Ihor Matsiyevskyi, Darya Podoltseva	Pavlo Ostrikov
2025	Yuriy Izdryk	—	Pavlo Kazarin	Bohdana Pivnenko, Oleksandr Shymko	Vasyl Vovkun	Zhanna Kadyrova, Valentyna Karpets-Yermolayeva, Andriy Pikush, Mariya Pikush, Nataliya Rybak	Oles Sanin, Serhiy Mykhalchuk, Alla Zahaikevych
2024	Dmytro Lazutkin, Yaryna Chornohuz	—	Authors of the documentary 20 Days in Mariupol: Evgeny Maloletka, Mstyslav Chernov, Vasylisa Stepanenko	Susana Dzhamaladinova (Jamala), Karmella Tsepkolenko	Ivan Uryvskyi, Tetiana Ovsiychuk, Susanna Karpenko	Andriy Yermolenko (artist)	—
2023	Kateryna Kalytko	Mykhailo Nazarenko	Vitaliy Portnikov	Members of the band Khoreya Kozatska: Taras Kompanichenko, Maksym Berezhnyuk, Severyn Danyleiko, Yaroslav Krysko, Serhiy Okhrimchuk	—	—	Iryna Tsilyk
2022	Tamara Duda	Hryhoriy Hrabovych	Stanislav Aseev, Mykola Riabchuk	—	Tamara Trunova, Natalya Vorozhbyt, Yuriy Larionov, Andriy Isaienko and Valeria Khodos	Mykyta Kadan, Tyberiy Szilvashi	Kateryna Gornostai

== Discontinued nominations ==
=== Field of cinematography ===
During its history the prize was additionally awarded for featured films (until introduction of the Dovzhenko State Prize in 1994).

- 1967 for the film Viper to Viktor Ivchenko (film director)
- 1971 for the film Family of Kotsyubynsky" to Tymofiy Levchuk (as film director), Oleksandr Levada (as script writer) and Oleksandr Hai (as featured actor)
- 1973 for the documentary Soviet Ukraine to Alexander Kosinov (film director), Ihor Pysanko (camera), Mykhailo Tkach (scriptwriter)
- 1975 for the feature film To the last minute to Valeriy Isakov (director), Vladimir Belyayev (script writer), Vladislav Dvorzhetsky (featured actor) and Valeriya Zaklunna (featured actress)
- 1977 for the films Only "Old Men" Are Going Into Battle and Aty-Baty, soldiers chanted to Leonid Bykov (actor)
- 1978 for the documentary cinema-trilogy Soviet Ukraine. Years of struggle and victories. to Ihor Hrabovsky (script writer and director), Volodymyr Shevchenko (director), Ihor Malyshevsky (script and diction texts writer)
- 1979 for the film Reapers (1978) to Volodymyr Denysenko (film director)
- 1980 for the public television documentary Revival, from the book by then-Soviet leader Leonid Brezhnev to script authors Albert Putintsev and Volodymyr Barsuk, cinematographers Oleksandr Buzylevych and Viktor Kushch, and anchorman Vyacheslav Tikhonov
- 1982 for the film The Gadfly to Mykola Mashchenko (film director), Sergei Bondarchuk (for role of Cardinal Montanelli), Andrei Kharitonov (leading actor)
- 1985 for the film Troubled skies of Spain to Arnoldo Ibañez-Fernandez (film director), Volodymyr Kukorenchuk (cinematographer), Boris Dobrodeyev and Nikolai Shishlin (script authors)
- 1986 for the films The night is short and How young we were to Mykhailo Belikov (director and script writer), Oleksiy Levchenko (artistic director) and Vasyl Trushkovsky (camera)
- 1986 for the documentaries Army commanders of industry, Commanding corps and Strategy of science to Anton Komarnytsky and Ihor Sabeknykov (script writers), Valentyn Sperkach (film director), Yuri Stakhovsky (cinema) and Ihor Poklad (composer)
- 1987 for the film Star of Vavilov about the life of imprisoned Russian agronomist Nikolai Vavilov to Anatoliy Borsyuk (film director), Serhiy Dyachenko (script writer), Oleksandr Frolov (camera)
- 1988 for cartoon series "Cossacks" about the Zaporozhian Cossacks to Anatoliy Havrylov (cinematography), Volodymyr Dakhno (film director) and Eduard Kirych (character artist)
- 1988 for numerous roles in several films to Ivan Mykolaichuk (actor, posthumously)
- 1989 for the cinema-trilogy Chornobyl: two colors of time to Ihor Kobryn (film director), Yuri Bordakov (camera), Leonid Muzhuk and Khem Salhanyk (script writers)
- 1991 for the film Shadows of Forgotten Ancestors (1964) to Sergei Parajanov (film director, posthumously), Yuri Ilienko (camera), Larysa Kadochnykova (actress) and Heorhiy Yakutovych (artist)
- 1991 for the documentaries Open yourself, Taras and In front of an icon to Rolan Serhiyenko (film director), Volodymyr Kostenko (posthumously) and Mykola Shudrya (script writers) and Oleksandr Koval (camera)

=== Politics ===
On occasion it was awarded in 1964 on political basis to the Chairman of the Council of Ministers of USSR Nikita Khrushchev.

=== Architecture ===
Before introduction of the State Prize of Ukraine in Architecture in 1991, the Schevchenko National Prize was awarded for architecture as well:

- 1971 for Palace "Ukraine" (Kyiv) to Yevhenia Marynchenko and Petro Zhylytsky
- 1972 for monument "Battle of Glory of the Soviet forces" (Lviv) to Myron Vendzilovych (architect), Dmytro Krvavych (sculptor), Yaroslav Motyka (sculptor), Oleksandr Pirozhkov (artist-monumentalist)
- 1973 for monument "Ukraine for liberators" (Luhansk Oblast) to Heorhiy Holovchenko (architect), Ivan Minko (architect), Anatoliy Yehorov (architect), Ivan Chumak (sculptor), Vasyl Fedchenko (sculptor), Viktor Mukhin (sculptor), Ilya Ovcharenko (sculptor)
- 1974 for monument of Lesya Ukrainka (Kyiv) to Anatoliy Ihnashchenko (architect) and Halyna Kalchenko (sculptor)
- 1975 for sculpture portraits of his contemporaries (Korotchenko, Rylsky, Filatov) to Oleksandr Kovaliov
- 1977 for monument commemorating the declaration of the Soviet government in Ukraine (Kharkiv) to Ihor Alfyorov (architect), Anatoliy Maksymenko (architect), Mykhailo Ovsyakin (architect), Serhiy Svetlorusov (architect), Eryk Cherkasov (architect), Vasyl Ahibalov (sculptor), Yakov Ryk (sculptor)
- 1978 for creation of the Crimea Oblast Music and Drama Theater (Simferopol) to Saniya Afzametdinova (architect), Ernest Bykov (architect), Vitaliy Yudin (architect)
- 1978 for monument to the soldiers of the 1st Cavalry Army (Lviv Oblast) to Valentyn Borysenko (sculptor)
- 1979 for Complex of the Dmytro Yavornytsky National Historical Museum of Dnipro (Dnipropetrovsk) to Volodymyr Zuyev (architect and author of the complex reconstruction), Horpyna Vatchenko (museum director), Mykola But (diorama author Battle for Dnieper), Volodymyr Korotkov (museum interior author), Mykola Oviechkin (diorama author Battle for Dnieper), Vitaliy Prokuda (diorama scientific concept author Battle for Dnieper), Volodymyr Ryvin (museum interior author)
- 1980 for Silvery residential quarters (Lviv) to Yaroslav Kornilyev (engineer-constructor), Liudmila Nivina (architect), Zinoviy Podlesny (architect), Serhiy Zemyankin (architect)
- 1981 for Museum of shipbuilding and fleet (Mykolaiv) to Eduard Shorin (project director), Tamara Huselnykova (architect), Viktor Ivanov (engineer-constructor), Leonid Keranchuk (builder), Mykhailo Oziorny (artist), Viktor Semerniov (artist), Yuri Steshyn (artist), Liudmila Khlopinska (scientific consultant), Halyna Cherednychenko (scientific consultant)
- 1981 for Sumy Theater of Drama and Music Comedy in the name of M. Shchepkin to Stepan Slipets (director), Mykhailo Lushpa (architect), Iryna Petrova (engineer-constructor), Andriy Chornodid (architect)
- 1982 for creation of Music and Drama Theater in the name of Ivan Franko using the folklore motives (Ivano-Frankivsk) to Leonid Sandler (architect), Dmytro Sosnovy (architect), Vasyl Vilshuk (sculptor), Vasyl Lukashko (carver), Anton Ovchar (red-tree carpenter), Volodymyr Shevchuk (artist)
- 1983 for building and improvement of the city of Verkhniodniprovsk (Dnipropetrovsk Oblast) to Anatoliy Antonov (architect), Mykhailo Butenko (ground director), Mykola Lutsenko (architect), Oleksandr Moliverov (architect), Anatoliy Pidvezko (architect), Heorhiy Ratushny (architect), (Vasyl Streltsov) (ground director)
- 1983 for restoration of Mariinskyi Palace (Kyiv) to Anatoliy Yavorsky (engineer, director of creative collective), Vadym Hlybchenko (technical architect), Iryna Ivanenko (critic), Yevhen Kulikov (sculptor), Lev Novikov (architect), Arkady Khabinsky (engineer), Vitaly Shkliar (architect)
- 1983 for high relief "In a family of one" to Vasyl Svida
- 1984 for hotel complex "Hradetsky" (Chernihiv) to Valentyn Shtolko (architect, group leader), Alla Hrachiova (architect), Oleksandr Kabatsky (architect), Ihor Liubenko (architect), Volodymyr Ralchenko (architect), Volodymyr Sloboda (engineer-constructor)
- 1985 for architecture and artistic design of the Kyiv affiliation of Central Lenin museum (Kyiv) to Valery Barulenkov (civil engineer), Anatoliy Haydamaka (artist), Vadym Hopkalo (architect), Vadym Hrechyna (architect), Volodymyr Kolomiyets (architect), Vitaliy Miahkov (artist), Leonid Filenko (architect)
- 1985 for monument to the heroes of the Horlivka military uprising of 1905 (Donetsk Oblast) to Yevhen Horban (sculptor)
- 1985 for complex of the Republican Scientifically Methodical Center of mother and child health protection to Dmytro Popenko (architect, group director), Leonid Los (architect), Iryna Pukhova (engineer-constructor)
- 1986 for architecture in the village of Vuzlove (Lviv Oblast) to Ivan-Volodymyr Karpliuk (builder), Viktor Marchenko (architect), Ivan Oksentiuk (architect), Yosyp Parubochy (agronomist-landscaper), Vasyl Skuratovsky (architect), Andriy Shuliar (architect)
- 1987 for regional museum (Cherkasy) to Oleksiy Dubovy (science consultant), Oleksandra Stetsenko (design engineer), Leonid Kondratsky, Mykola Sobchuk, Serhiy Fursenko (architects)
- 1989 for creation of the Historical-Cultural Preservation in Pereiaslav (Kyiv Oblast) to Mykhailo Sikorsky

== See also ==
- Cross of Ivan Mazepa
- Kobzar Literary Award
- List of things named after Taras Shevchenko
- List of European art awards
- Shota Rustaveli State Prize — similar prize of Georgia.
- Vasyl Stus Prize
- Warrior of Light
