= 1909 in animation =

Events in 1909 in animation.

== Events ==
- The German orientalist Paul E. Kahle discovered leather puppets near Damietta, Egypt which were used in medieval shadow plays, one of the precursors of silhouette animation.

== Films released ==
- Unknown date – To Demonstrate How Spiders Fly (United Kingdom)

== Births ==
=== January ===
- January 2: Lloyd Vaughan, American animator (Warner Bros. Cartoons), (d. 1988).
- January 17: Don Figlozzi, American animator and cartoonist, pioneer in television animation ( Fleischer Studios, Walt Disney Animation Studios, Terrytoons), (d. 1981).
- January 21: Sid Raymond, American comedian and voice actor (voice of Baby Huey and Katnip), (d. 2006).
- January 26: Nikolai Prilutskiy, Soviet and Russian sound operator and director of audiography, worked primarily in Soviet animated sound films (The Snow Maiden, The Enchanted Boy, The Twelve Months, The Snow Queen), (d. 1990).
- January 27: Lester Novros, American animator, art director, and teacher of filmmaking (Snow White and the Seven Dwarfs, Fantasia), (d. 2000).

=== February ===
- February 2: Purv Pullen, American actor (Silly Symphonies, Birds in Snow White and the Seven Dwarfs), (d. 1992).
- February 9: Heather Angel, English actress (voice of Alice's sister in Alice in Wonderland, Mrs. Darling in Peter Pan), (d. 1986).
- February 11: Al Eugster, American animator, writer, and film director (Fleischer Studios, Iwerks Studio, Walt Disney Productions, Famous Studios), (d. 1997).
- February 21: Alexandra Snezhko-Blotskaya, Russian animator and film director (The Enchanted Boy), (d. 1980).
- February 26: Lou Lilly, American animator (Warner Bros. Cartoons), (d. 1999).
- February 28: Olan Soule, American actor (voice of Batman in The Adventures of Batman, Sesame Street, The New Scooby-Doo Movies, and Super Friends, Master Taj in Fantastic Planet, the Boy's Father in The Small One, Martin Stein in Super Friends: The Legendary Super Powers Show), (d. 1994).

=== March ===
- March 1: Winston Sharples, American composer (Van Beuren Studios, Fleischer Studios, Famous Studios), (d. 1978).
- March 11: Jules Engel, American animator, graphic artist, and film director, the founding director of the experimental animation program at the California Institute of the Arts (Screen Gems, Walt Disney Animation Studios), (d. 2003).
- March 16: Don Raye, American songwriter (Walt Disney Animation Studios), (d. 1985).
- March 17: Ken Anderson, art director and writer for the Walt Disney Animation Studios (Snow White and the Seven Dwarfs, Pinocchio, Fantasia), (d. 1993).
- March 22:
  - Ralph Heimdahl, American animator and comics artist (Walt Disney Company, made comics based on Bugs Bunny), (d. 1981).
  - Milt Kahl, American animator, one of Disney's Nine Old Men, (d. 1987).
- March 25: Jerry Livingston, American songwriter (theme songs of The Bugs Bunny Show and Casper the Friendly Ghost, co-writer of "Bibbidi-Bobbidi-Boo" in Cinderella), (d. 1987).
- March 29: Jack Kinney, American animator, director and producer (Pinocchio, Dumbo, Saludos Amigos), (d. 1992).

=== April ===
- April 14: Jim Pabian, American animator, screenwriter, and director (Leon Schlesinger Productions, Harman & Ising, Metro-Goldwyn-Mayer cartoon studio), (d. 1996).
- April 24: Irven Spence, American animator (Tom and Jerry), (d. 1995).

=== May ===
- May 10: Arturo Moreno, Spanish animator, cartoonist, and comics artist (Garbancito de la Mancha, Alegres vacaciones), (d. 1993).
- May 13: Ken Darby, American composer and conductor (Walt Disney Animation Studios), (d. 1992).
- May 15: James Mason, British actor (narrator of The Tell-Tale Heart), (d. 1984).
- May 20: Jerry Hausner, American actor (voice of Waldo in Mr. Magoo, Hemlock Holmes, The Mole, Broodles and Itchy in The Dick Tracy Show), (d. 1993).
- May 25: Marie Menken, American film director, painter and animator, (d. 1970).
- May 30: Benny Goodman, American jazz band leader (provided music to the All the Cats Join In and After You've Gone segments in Make Mine Music), (d. 1986).

=== June ===
- June 13: Hannes Schroll, Austrian skier and yodeller (creator of the Goofy holler sound effect), (d. 1985).
- June 14: Burl Ives, American singer and actor (voice of Sam the Snowman in Rudolph the Red-Nosed Reindeer), (d. 1995).
- June 20: Helen Ogger, American inker and animator (Walt Disney Studios), (d. 1983).
- June 26: Wolfgang Reitherman, American animator, director and producer, (one of Disney's Nine Old Men), (d. 1985).

=== August ===
- August 8: David Tendlar, American animator (Fleischer Studios, Famous Studios), (d. 1993).
- August 11: Edwin Gillette, American inventor and cinematographer, creator of the Syncro-Vox technique of limited animation, executive of Cambria Productions (Clutch Cargo, Space Angel, Captain Fathom), (d. 2003).

=== September ===
- September 3: Yale Gracey, Writer and layout artist (Walt Disney Animation Studios), (d. 1983).
- September 8: Lynn Karp, American animator and comics artist (Walt Disney Company), (d. 1992).

=== October ===
- October 1:
  - Everett Sloane, American actor (voice of the title character in The Dick Tracy Show), (d. 1965).
  - Romer Zane Grey, American animator (Romer Grey Studio) and comics writer, (d. 1976).
- October 15: Margie Hines, American actress (original voice of Betty Boop, occasional voice of Olive Oyl and Swee'Pea in Popeye), (d. 1985).
- October 26: Dante Quinterno, Argentine animator, comics artist, and publisher, created the first animated color film of Latin America (Upa en apuros), (d. 2003).
- October 31: Thelma Boardman, American actress (voice of Minnie Mouse from 1937 to 1938, and 1941 to 1942), (d. 1978).

=== November ===
- November 7: Campbell Grant, American actor (voice of Angus MacBadger in The Adventures of Ichabod and Mr. Toad), character designer and animation writer (Fantasia), (d. 1992).
- November 10: Johnny Marks, American composer (Rudolph the Red-Nosed Reindeer), (d. 1985).
- November 25: P. D. Eastman, American screenwriter, children's author, and illustrator (Private Snafu, UPA), (d. 1986).

=== December ===
- December 12: Dick Moores, American cartoonist and producer of television animation, co-founder of Telecomics, (d. 1986).
- December 20: Amby Paliwoda, American animator (Snow White and the Seven Dwarves, Fat Albert and the Cosby Kids), (d. 1999).
- December 23: Maurice Denham, English actor (voice of all animals in Animal Farm), (d. 2002).
- December 26: Don Patterson, American animator, director and producer (Walt Disney Animation Studios, Pixar Animation Studios, Metro-Goldwyn-Mayer cartoon studio, DePatie-Freleng Enterprises, Warner Bros.-Seven Arts Animation), (d. 1998).

=== Specific date unknown ===
- Fred Abranz, American comics artist and animator (Walt Disney Company), (d. 1992).

== Sources ==
- Canemaker, John (2001). "Milt Kahl". Walt Disney's Nine Old Men and the Art of Animation. Disney Editions. pp. 125–165. ISBN 978-0786864966.
- Lenburg, Jeff (2006), "King, Jack", Who's who in Animated Cartoons: An International Guide to Film and Television's Award-Winning and Legendary Animators, Hal Leonard Corporation, ISBN 978-1557836717
