= List of animated feature films of the 1950s =

A list of animated feature films released in the 1950s.

== List ==
Title	Country	Director	Production company	Animation technique	Notes	Release date
1950
Cinderella	United States	Clyde Geronimi, Hamilton Luske, Wilfred Jackson	Walt Disney Productions	Traditional		February 15, 1950
Always Happy; Immer wieder Glück	West Germany	Ferdinand Diehl		Stop motion		October 1, 1950
Johnny the Giant Killer; Jeannot l'intrépide	France	Jean Image		Traditional		December 13, 1950
Once Upon A Time; Érase una vez	Spain	Alexandre Cirici-Pellicer		Traditional		December 18, 1950
1951
Prince Bayaya; Bajaja	Czechoslovakia	Jiří Trnka		Stop motion		January 26, 1951
Alice in Wonderland	United States	Clyde Geronimi, Wilfred Jackson, Hamilton Luske	Walt Disney Productions	Traditional		July 26, 1951
The Night Before Christmas; Noch pered Rozhdestvom	Soviet Union	Valentina Brumberg, Zinaida Brumberg	Soyuzmultfilm	Traditional		December 31, 1951
1952
The Snow Maiden; Snyegurochka	Soviet Union	Ivan Ivanov-Vano, Aleksandra Snezhko-Blotskaya	Soyuzmultfilm	Traditional		February 2, 1952
The Scarlet Flower; Alenkiy tsvetochek	Soviet Union	Lev Atamanov	Soyuzmultfilm	Traditional		June 6, 1952
The Shepherdess and the Chimney Sweep; La Bergère et le Ramoneur	France	Paul Grimault		Traditional		September 1952
The Visions of Tay-Pi; Los Sueños de Tay-Pi	Spain	José María Blay, Franz Winterstein		Traditional		December 22, 1952
1953
Peter Pan	United States	Clyde Geronimi, Wilfred Jackson, Hamilton Luske	Walt Disney Productions	Traditional		February 5, 1953
Tobias Knopp – Adventure of a Bachelor	West Germany	Gerhard Fieber		Traditional		February 8, 1953
The Treasure of Bird Island; Poklad Ptacího ostrova	Czechoslovakia	Karel Zeman		Stop motion		March 27, 1953
Old Czech Legends; Staré pověsti české	Czechoslovakia	Jiří Trnka		Stop motion		April 8, 1953
Dangerous When Wet	United States	Charles Walters	M-G-M Cartoons	Traditional/Live Action		July 3, 1953
Bonjour Paris	France	Jean Image		Traditional		October 30, 1953
1954
Tsarevna the Frog; Tsarevna-Lyagushka	Soviet Union	Mikhail Tsekhanovsky	Soyuzmultfilm	Traditional		January 1, 1954
Amazon Symphony; Sinfonia Amazônica	Brazil	Anelio Latini		Traditional	First Brazilian animated feature.	January 13, 1954
The Good Soldier Schweik; Dobrý voják Švejk	Czechoslovakia	Jiří Trnka		Stop motion		August 19, 1954
Hansel and Gretel: An Opera Fantasy	United States	Michael Myerberg, John Paul	RKO Radio Pictures	Stop motion		October 10, 1954
Animal Farm	United Kingdom; United States	John Halas, Joy Batchelor	Halas and Batchelor	Traditional	First British animated feature	December 22, 1954
1955
Lady and the Tramp	United States	Clyde Geronimi, Wilfred Jackson, Hamilton Luske	Walt Disney Productions	Traditional	First animated feature to be presented in widescreen (CinemaScope)	June 22, 1955
The Enchanted Boy; Zakoldovanyy malchik	Soviet Union	Vladimir Polkovnikov, Aleksandra Snezhko-Blotskaya	Soyuzmultfilm	Traditional		September 16, 1955
The Enchanted Village	Canada	Marcel Racicot, Réal Racicot		Traditional	First Canadian animated feature	December 23, 1955
1956
The Devil and Kate; Čert a Káča	Czechoslovakia	Václav Bedřich	Bratři v triku	Traditional		April 20, 1956
Invitation to the Dance	United States	Gene Kelly	M-G-M Cartoons	Traditional/Live Action		May 22, 1956
The Heavenly Creation; Nebesnoe sozdanie	Soviet Union	Sergey Obraztsov, Georgiy Natanson, Grigoriy Lomidze	Soyuzmultfilm	Stop Motion	First Soviet full-length animated film made completely in stop-motion technology of animation	October 24, 1956
Our Mr. Sun	United States	Frank Capra (Live action), Williams Hurtz (animation)	UPA (animation)	Traditional/Live action	First animated feature made for TV	November 19, 1956
The Twelve Months; 12 mesyatsev	Soviet Union	Ivan Ivanov-Vano, Mikhail Botov	Soyuzmultfilm	Traditional		December 31, 1956
1957
The Big Fun Carnival	United States	Marc Daniels, Shamus Culhane, Hans Fischerkoesen, Dave Fleischer, John A. Haeseler, George Pal		Traditional/Stop Motion	A compilation film of old theatrical cartoons previously distributed by Paramount Pictures. Originally planned as the first of twelve such features, only this first one was released.	January 20, 1957
Hemo the Magnificent	United States	Frank Capra		Traditional/Live action		March 20, 1957
The Snow Queen; Snezhnaya koroleva	Soviet Union	Lev Atamanov, Nikolay Fyodorov	Soyuzmultfilm	Traditional		December 31, 1957
1958
Beloved Beauty; Krasa nyenaglyadnaya	Soviet Union	Vladimir Degtyaryov	Soyuzmultfilm	Stop motion		1958
The Fabulous World of Jules Verne; Vynález zkázy	Czechoslovakia	Karel Zeman		Stop motion/Live action		1958
The Picchiatelli	Italy	Antonio Attanasi			documentary about animation, show 2-d animation and stop-motion puppet	1958
The Creation of the World	France; Czechoslovakia	Eduard Hofman		Traditional		April 4, 1958
The White Snake Enchantress; Hakuja den	Japan	Taiji Yabushita, Kazuhiko Okabe	Toei Animation	Traditional	First anime feature to be in color and the first feature film produced by Toei Animation.	October 22, 1958
1959
Chuang Tapestry 一幅僮锦	China	Qian Jagun	Shanghai Animation Film Studio	Traditional	First Chinese animated feature to be produced as the People's Republic of China	1959
Sleeping Beauty	United States	Clyde Geronimi, Les Clark, Eric Larson, Wolfgang Reitherman	Walt Disney Productions	Traditional	First animated feature to be presented in Super Technirama 70 widescreen, Last Disney feature to use traditional inking.	January 29, 1959
Hyoutan suzume ひょうたんすずめ	Japan	Yokoyama Ryuichi		Traditional		February 10, 1959
I Was a Satellite of the Sun; Ya byl sputnikom Solntsa (Note: Я был спутником Солнца)	Soviet Union	Victor Morgenstern	Soyuzmultfilm, Mosnauchfilm	Traditional/Live action	First Soviet feature film combining the traditional animation and live-action	May 5, 1959
A Midsummer Night's Dream; Sen noci svatojánské	Czechoslovakia	Jiří Trnka		Stop motion		September 25, 1959
1001 Arabian Nights	United States	Jack Kinney	Columbia Pictures; UPA	Traditional		December 1, 1959
Magic Boy; Shōnen Sarutobi Sasuke	Japan	Akira Daikubara, Taiji Yabushita	Toei Animation	Traditional	First anime film released in widescreen.	December 25, 1959
The Adventures of Buratino; Priklyucheniya Buratino	Soviet Union	Ivan Ivanov-Vano, Dmitriy Babichenko, Mikhail Botov	Soyuzmultfilm	Traditional	Last drawn full-length animated film which entered the period of the Soviet social realism	December 31, 1959

== Highest-grossing animated films of the decade ==
Rank	Title	Studio	Release Year	Gross	Ref
1	Cinderella	Walt Disney Productions	1950	$182,000,000	
2	Lady and the Tramp	Walt Disney Productions	1955	$7,500,000	
3	Sleeping Beauty	Walt Disney Productions	1959	$5,300,000	
4	Dangerous When Wet	M-G-M Cartoons	1953	$2,500,000	
5	Alice in Wonderland	Walt Disney Productions	1951	$2,400,000	
6	Once Upon A Time		1950	$1,500,000	
6	Bonjour Paris		1953	$1,500,000	
6	The Enchanted Boy	Soyuzmultfilm	1955	$1,500,000	
6	The Devil and Kate	Bratři v triku	1956	$1,500,000	
6	Our Mr. Sun	UPA (animation)	1956	$1,500,000	
6	The Twelve Months	Soyuzmultfilm	1956	$1,500,000	
6	Beloved Beauty		1958	$1,500,000	
6	The Creation of the World		1958	$1,500,000	
7	Invitation to the Dance	M-G-M Cartoons	1956	$615,000	
