= Hello Moscow! =

1945 film

- Directed by: Sergei Yutkevich
- Written by: Nikolai Erdman; Mikhail Volpin
- Starring: Oleg Bobrov; Sergei Filippov; Pavel Kadochnikov; Nikolai Leonov
- Cinematography: Mark Magidson
- Release date: 1945
- Running time: 86 minutes
- Country: Soviet Union
- Language: Russian

Hello Moscow! (Russian: Zdravstvuy, Moskva!, Russian: Здравствуй, Москва!) is a 1945 Soviet historical musical film directed by Sergei Yutkevich. It was entered into the 1946 Cannes Film Festival.

== Plot ==
At a student talent showcase, a trade school apprentice performs a song about Moscow, accompanying himself on a bayan accordion. This instrument, once owned by a skilled worker who perished during the 1905 demonstrations, has passed through many hands before ending up with the students. The school's director narrates the bayan's journey, revealing its poignant and storied past.

== Cast ==
- Oleg Bobrov as Oleg
- Sergei Filippov as Brikin, the accordionist
- Pavel Kadochnikov
- Nikolai Leonov as Kolya
- Ivan Lyubeznov as School Director
- Lev Pirogov as Grandfather Nicanor
- Vasili Seleznyov as Fedya
- Andrei Shirshov as School Assistant Director
- Anya Stravinskaya as Tanya
- Boris Tenin as Playwright
