= Fyodor Khitruk =

Russian animator and film director (1917–2012)

- Фёдор Хитрук
- Born: 1 May 1917 [O.S. 18 April] Tver, Russian Provisional Government
- Died: 3 December 2012 (aged 95); Moscow, Russia
- Occupations: Animator; animation director; screenwriter; pedagogue
- Years active: 1937–1986
- Notable work: The Story of a Crime; Film, Film, Film; Winnie-the-Pooh trilogy

Fyodor Savelyevich Khitruk (Note: Russian: Фёдор Савельевич Хитрук, romanized: Fyodor Savelyevich Khitruk) (1 May 1917 [O.S. 18 April] – 3 December 2012) was a Soviet and Russian animator, animation director, screenwriter and pedagogue.

== Biography ==
Khitruk was born in Tver into a Jewish family. He came to Moscow to study graphic design at the OGIS College for Applied Arts. He graduated in 1936 and started to work with Soyuzmultfilm in 1938 as an animator. From 1962 onward, he worked as a director. His first film The Story of a Crime was an immense success. Today, this film is seen as the beginning of a renaissance of Soviet animation after a two-decade-long life in the shadows of socialist realism.

Diverging from the “naturalistic” Disney-like canons that were reigning in the 1950-60s in Soviet animated cartoons, he created his own style, which was laconic yet multi-level, non-trivial and vivid.

He is the director of outstanding animated short films including such classics as his social satire of bureaucrats, The Man in the Frame (1966), the philosophic parable, Island (1973) about the loneliness of a man in modern society, the biographical film The Young Friedrich Engels (1970), based on drawings and letters of young Engels, the parody Film, Film, Film (1968), and the anti-war film, The Lion and the Bull (1983).

In April 1993, Khitruk and three other leading animators (Yuri Norstein, Andrei Khrzhanovsky, and Eduard Nazarov) founded SHAR Studio, an animation school and studio in Russia. The Russian Cinema Committee is among the share-holders in the studio.

In 2008, he released a two-volume book titled The Profession of Animation (Russian: Профессия – аниматор). He is the grandfather of violin virtuoso Anastasia Khitruk.

Khitruk lived in Moscow, where he died in 2012, aged 95.

== Filmography ==
=== Animator ===
- The Night Before Christmas (Ночь перед Рождеством, 1951)
- The Scarlet Flower (Аленький цветочек, 1952)
- The Enchanted Boy (Заколдованный мальчик, 1955)
- Snowman Postman (Снеговик-почтовик, 1955)
- The Twelve Months (Двенадцать месяцев, 1956)
- The Snow Queen (Снежная королева, 1957)
- The Adventures of Buratino (Приключения Буратино, 1959)
- It Was I Who Drew the Little Man (Человечка нарисовал я, 1960)
- The Key (Ключ, 1961)

=== Director ===
- The Story of a Crime (История одного преступления, 1962)
- Stompy (Топтыжка, 1964) (also screenwriter)
- Boniface's Holiday (Каникулы Бонифация, 1965) (also screenwriter)
- The Man in the Frame (Человек в рамке, 1966) (also screenwriter)
- Othello 67 (Отелло-67, 1967) (also screenwriter)
- Film, Film, Film (Фильм, фильм, фильм, 1968) (also screenwriter, together with Vladimir Golovanov)
- Zigzag of Success (Зигзаг удачи, 1968) (animated sections)
- Winnie-the-Pooh (Винни-Пух, 1969) (also screenwriter, together with Boris Zakhoder)
- The Young Friedrich Engels (Юноша Фридрих Энгельс, 1970) (co-directed and co-written with Vadim Kurchevsky and Klaus and Katya Georgi)
- Winnie-the-Pooh Pays a Visit (Винни-Пух идёт в гости, 1971) (also screenwriter, together with Boris Zakhoder)
- Winnie-the-Pooh and a Busy Day (Винни-Пух и день забот, 1972) (co-directed with Gennady Sokolsky, co-written with Boris Zakhoder)
- Island (Остров, 1973) (also screenwriter)
- I Grant You a Star (Дарю тебе звезду, 1974) (also screenwriter)
- The Flight of Mr. McKinley (Бегство мистера Мак-Кинли, 1975) (animated sections)
- Icarus and the Wise Men (Икар и мудрецы, 1976)
- O Sport, You Are Peace! (О спорт, ты — мир!, 1981) (animated sections)
- Olympians (Олимпионики, 1982) (also screenwriter)
- The Lion and the Bull (Лев и бык, 1983) (also screenwriter)

== Honours and awards ==
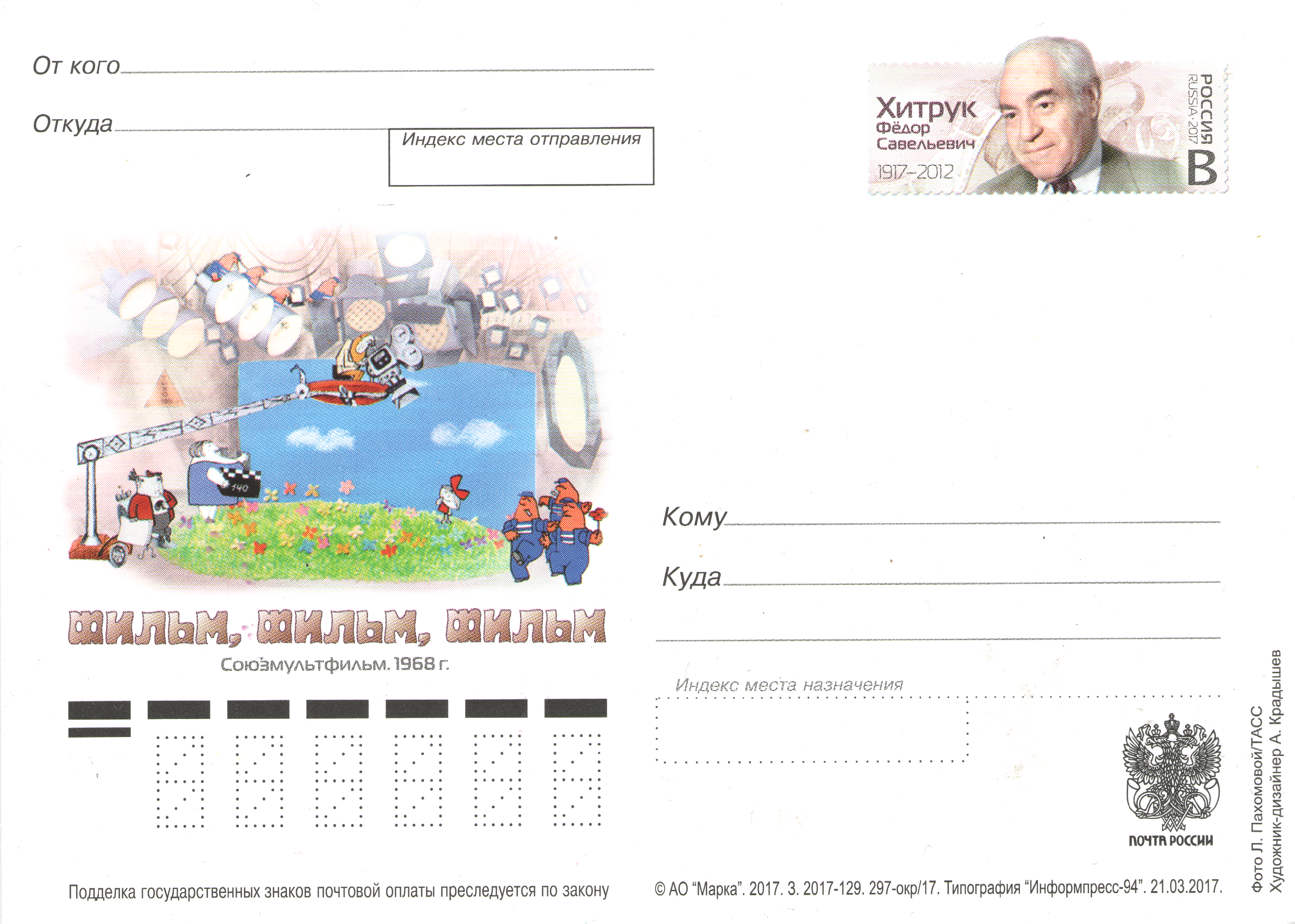
Russian postal card with Fyodor Khitruk stamp

- Order of the Red Banner of Labour (1971)
- People's Artist of the RSFSR (1977)
- Order of the Patriotic War, 2nd class (1985)
- People's Artist of the USSR (1987)
- Findling Award for his life's work (1987)
- Order "For Merit to the Fatherland", 3rd class (1998)

Awards

- San Francisco International Film Festival — "Golden Gate" Prize for the film "The Story of a Crime" (1962)
- International Short Film Festival Oberhausen — Honorary diploma film "The Story of a Crime" (1963)
- All-Union Film Festival
  - First Prize in the animated films section, for "The Story of a Crime" (1964)
  - First Prize in the animated films section, the film "Boniface's Holiday" (1966)
- Venice Film Festival — Prize "Bronze Lion of St. Mark", the film "Stompy" (1964)
- Cork International Film Festival — Honorary Diploma for the film "Boniface's Holiday" (1965)
- International Animation Film Festival in Mamaia — "Golden Pelican" Prize in the children's films category for "Boniface's Holiday" (1966)
- International Festival of Films for Children in Tehran — Encouraging diploma film "Boniface's Holiday" (1967)
- International Short Film Festival in Kraków — Honorary Diploma for "Film, Film, Film" (1969)
- International Short Film Festival in Tampere — prize, the movie "Film, Film, Film" (1970)
- International Leipzig Festival for Documentary and Animated Film — "Golden Dove" Prize for "The Young Friedrich Engels" (1970)
- International Short Film Festival Oberhausen - Award International Jury of Public Universities for "The Young Friedrich Engels" (1971)
- National Prize of the GDR — "The Young Friedrich Engels" (1971)
- International Animation Film Festival in New York — Silver Medal for the movie "Film, Film, Film" (1973)
- All-Union Film Festival — Second Prize in the section of animated films, the movie "Island" (1974)
- Cannes Film Festival — Golden Palm for short films, for "Island" (1974)
- International Short Film Festival in Kraków — Grand Prix "Golden Dragon of Wawel", Cash Prize, Diploma SIDALK for "Island" (1974)
- Cannes Film Festival — Special Jury Prize (the main competition of short films), the film "I Grant You a Star" (1975)
- USSR State Prize — the film "Winnie the Pooh", "Winnie-the-Pooh Goes on a Visit", "Winnie-the-Pooh and the Day of Concern", "I Grant You a Star", "Island", "Film, Film, Film" (1976)
- USSR State Prize — animation film "O Sport, You Are Peace!" (1982)
- International Film Festival "Cinanima" in Espinho — Honorary Diploma in the category of films from 3 to 12 minutes for the movie "The Lion and the Bull" (1983)
- International Short Film Festival in Tampere — "For the mastery of the classical style of animation" for the film "The Lion and the Bull" (1983)
- International Festival of Animation films in Toronto — audience prize for the film "The Lion and the Bull" (1984)
- Prize of the President of the Russian Federation in the field of literature and art (1998)
- Annecy International Animation Film Festival — Jury Award "for achievements in the profession" (2006)
- Nika Award — "Honour and Dignity" (the only cartoonist who has received a "Nika" in this category; 2006)
- Animafest Zagreb World Festival of Animated Film — Lifetime Achievement Award (2006)

== See also ==
- History of Russian animation
- Konstantin Bronzit
