= The Twelve Months (1956 film) =

- Original Russian poster
- Двенадцать месяцев
- Directed by: Ivan Ivanov-Vano; Mikhail Botov
- Written by: Samuil Marshak; Nikolay Erdman
- Based on: Samuil Marshak
- Produced by: Ivan Ivanov-Vano
- Music by: Moisey Vaynberg
- Production company: Soyuzmultfilm
- Release date: December 30, 1956 (USSR)
- Running time: 56 minutes
- Country: Soviet Union
- Language: Russian

The Twelve Months (Russian: Двенадцать месяцев; Dvenadtsat mesyatsev) is a 1956 Soviet traditionally animated feature film directed by the "patriarch of Russian animation", Ivan Ivanov-Vano. It was produced at the Soyuzmultfilm studio in Moscow and is based on the fairy-tale play of the same name by Samuil Marshak. The scene of action in the animated film isn't specified, but on a picture it is clear that action happens in the West (in the original of the story of Marshak — in Bohemia, then part of the Austrian empire) at the turn of the eighteenth to nineteenth centuries. The animated film plot quite precisely reflects story events, thus the particular emphasis is placed on ridiculing the shortcomings of an absolute monarchy.

The film's sound and image were restored in by Krupnyy Plan, who released it on video and DVD in Russia in 2005. An English-subtitled edition of the Russian-language version has not been released. However, Films by Jove released the film on DVD in 1999 as "volume 3" of its Stories from My Childhood series - this version features a choice of English, French or Spanish soundtracks.

== Plot ==
The capricious girl queen is semiliterate, bratty, and does not wish to be taught. When the lesson turns to botany, she wishes that April will arrive tomorrow, and bring with it the spring flowers, Snowdrops. The professor assures her that this is impossible, since it is the dead of winter, however the queen issues the decree: whoever brings a basket of these flowers to the palace, will receive the same basket of gold and a fur coat.

A poor country stepmother and her daughter dream of this reward and as soon as the stepdaughter they live with comes back home after gathering brushwood, they send her back to the wood — to carry out the royal will and gather the impossible Snowdrops.

The freezing stepdaughter comes to a glade in which a fire burns, and round it are the twelve brother Months. They listen carefully to the girl, and April asks his brothers to concede to him an hour or so to help her. She comes back home happy with snowdrops and a magic ring presented to her by April. If there is trouble, she can throw the ringlet and speak the magic words — and all twelve brother months will come to her rescue.

While the tired stepdaughter sleeps, her stepsister steals the magic ring. The stepmother and her daughter go to the royal palace with the basket of snowdrops, having left the stepdaughter at home. The pleased queen orders them to tell her where they found flowers in the winter. The two invent a tale about a wonderful place in which in the winter grow not only flowers, but even mushrooms and berries.

The queen herself decides to go to this wonderful place together with the court. The stepmother and her daughter admit that the stepdaughter was the one to gather the flowers. The queen takes them and the stepdaughter into the wood. The stepdaughter complains that the stepmother and daughter stole a ring from her, so the queen orders them to return it. After the stepdaughter receives the ring, the queen demands that the stepdaughter tell them where she found the snowdrops. After the stepdaughter refuses, the queen orders her guards to remove the stepdaughter's fur coat, threatens to execute her, and throws her magic ring into an ice-hole. The stepdaughter says the magic words April taught her and runs away.

At once there comes the Spring, and then — Summer. Around the queen it becomes dry and warm. Then there comes Autumn. The queen, having been drenched under the strongest autumn heavy rain, freezes suddenly as Winter arrives. The blizzard carries away all the fur coats which the court had taken off during the brief arrival of Summer. They begin to freeze and, abandoning the queen, the court flees back to the palace. With her remains only an old soldier and the professor. They cannot return home on the sledge as the horses had been taken by the court to return to the palace.

An old man in a white fur coat (brother month January) comes out of the wood and suggests that everyone think of one desire. The queen wishes to return home, the professor — that the seasons return to normal, the soldier — "just to get warm at a fire", and the stepmother and her daughter for fur coats made of dog fur. January begins with the last request and gives the two fur coats. They begin to squabble and are transformed into dogs. They are harnessed to the sledge, and the queen tries to use them to go back to the palace, but they don't get far.

The soldier comes to get warm at the brother months' fire. There he meets the stepdaughter, in all new furs and with a team of beautiful snow-white horses. The soldier suggests to the queen that they ask to borrow the horses so they may return home to the castle. The queen demands them, and offers the stepdaughter wealth and power in return, but the stepdaughter refuses. The soldier explains to the haughty queen that it is necessary to ask kindly. Once she does, the stepdaughter with pleasure lends them her horses and gives them warm fur coats. They all go home, having left the brother months at a New Year's fire.

== Creators ==
	English	Russian
Director-producer	Ivan Ivanov-Vano	Иван Иванов-Вано
Director	Mikhail Botov	Михаил Ботов
Scenario	Samuil Marshak; Nikolay Erdman	Самуил Маршак; Николай Эрдман
Art Directors	Anatoliy Kuritsyn; Konstantin Karpov; Aleksandr Belyakov	Анатолий Курицын; Константин Карпов; Александр Беляков
Artists	K. Malyshev; O. Gemmerling; Anatoliy Sazonov; Y. Tannenberg; V. Valerianova	К. Малышев; О. Геммерлинг; Анатолий Сазонов; Е. Танненберг; В. Валерианова
Animators	L. Popov; Yelena Hludova; Konstantin Chikin; Boris Butakov; Nikolay Fyodorov; Tatyana Fyodorova; Fyodor Khitruk; Boris Meyerovich; Faina Yepifanova; Vladimir Krumin; V. Ryabchikov; Vladimir Popov	Л. Попов; Елена Хлудова; Константин Чикин; Борис Бутаков; Николай Фёдоров; Татьяна Фёдорова; Фёдор Хитрук; Борис Меерович; Фаина Епифанова; Владимир Крумин; В. Рябчиков; Владимир Попов
Camera Operators	Nikolai Voinov; Yelena Petrova	Николай Воинов; Елена Петрова
Executive Producer	Natan Bitman	Натан Битман
Composer	Moisey Vaynberg	Моисей Вайнберг
Sound Operator	Nikolai Prilutskiy	Николай Прилуцкий

== Home video ==
The first home release of The Twelve Months in the 1980s, by the studio Videoprogrammoy Goskino USSR (Видеопрограммой Госкино СССР). In the early 1990s, the film was released again by the film association Krupny Plan. Later, it was included in the VHS collection “The Best Soviet Animated Films”, which contained several Ivanov-Vano films based on Pushkin fairy tales. Since 1994, the film has also been released on VHS by Soyuzmultfilm.

The Twelve Months was first released on DVD in 1999 by the company Films by Jove, with Spanish, French and English subtitles. In 2004, updated DVD versions of the film were released on wide sale.

== See also ==
- History of Russian animation
- List of animated feature-length films
