= Igor Podgorskiy =

Igor Podgorskiy Игорь Подгорский
- Born: Igor Vladimirovich Podgorskiy; September 4, 1922; Moscow, USSR
- Died: December 26, 1975 (aged 53); Moscow, USSR
- Occupations: animator, art director
- Years active: 1949—1974

Igor Vladimirovich Podgorskiy (Russian: Игорь Владимирович Подгорский (September 4, 1922 – December 26, 1975) was one of the greatest Soviet animators, who worked in the "Golden Era" of Soviet animation. He contributed to more than one hundred cartoons. Many of these cartoons have become The International and The National Classics.

== Filmography ==
- 1955—The Enchanted Boy(Заколдованный мальчик)
- 1956—The Ugly Duckling (Гадкий утёнок)
- 1957—The Snow Queen (Снежная королева)
- 1958—Gribok-teremok (Грибок-теремок)
- 1960—The Adventures of Buratino (Приключения Буратино)
- 1960—It Was I Who Drew the Little Man (Человечка нарисовал я)
- 1961—The Key (Ключ)
- 1970—Kanikuly Bonifatsiya (Каникулы Бонифация)
- 1970—Film, Film, Film (Фильм, Фильм, Фильм)
