= It Was I Who Drew the Little Man =

- Directed by: Brumberg sisters Valentin Lalayants
- Written by: Nikolai Erdman; Mikhail Volpin
- Starring: Valentina Sperantova; Mikhail Yanshin; Serafima Birman; Lev Sverdlin
- Music by: Nikita Bogoslovsky
- Production company: Soyuzmultfilm
- Release date: 1960
- Running time: 56 minutes
- Country: Soviet Union
- Language: Russian

It Was I Who Drew the Little Man (Russian: Челове́чка нарисова́л я; tr.: Chelovechka narisoval ya) is a 1960 Soviet traditionally-animated feature film directed by the "grandmothers of the Russian animation", Brumberg sisters, and Valentin Lalayants. It was produced at the Soyuzmultfilm studio in Moscow. The film is an expanded remake of a 1948 21-minute film by the same directors called Fedya Zaytsev.

In Russia, the film is available as part of the DVD collection called "Здравствуй, школа!" ("Hello, School!"). No English-subtitled version has been released.

== Plot ==
On the first of September, Fedya Zaytsev is the very first kid who comes to school. In his joy at realizing this, he draws a little man with an umbrella on the wall of his classroom with a piece of charcoal, realizing too late that this is against the rules. In class, the teacher notices the drawing and asks everyone to raise their hands. Fedya rubs out his hands so that they are clean, but his friend, with whom he had shaken hands earlier, has dirty hands and is blamed. Fedya goes home without saying anything, but the little man whom he drew follows him, and he teams up with all of Fedya's toys and the heroes of his favorite books to teach him a lesson. At the end of the film, Fedya admits his mistake.

== Creators ==
	English	Russian
Directors	Valentina and Zinaida Brumberg; Valentin Lalayants	Валентина и Зинаида Брумберг; Валентин Лалаянц
Scenario	Nikolai Erdman; Mikhail Volpin	Николай Эрдман; Михаил Вольпин
Art Directors	Lena Azarkh; Valentin Lalayants	Лана Азарх; Валентин Лалаянц
Artists	V. Valerianova; Geliy Arkadyev; Y. Tannenberg	В. Валерианова; Гелий Аркадьев; Е. Танненберг
Animators	Igor Podgorskiy; K. Malyshev; Vadim Dolgikh; Fyodor Khitruk; Vyacheslav Kotyonochkin; Mariya Motruk; Marina Voskanyants; Yelena Khludova; Boris Butakov; Faina Yepifanova	Игорь Подгорский; К. Малышев; Вадим Долгих; Фёдор Хитрук; Вячеслав Котёночкин; Мария Мотрук; Марина Восканьянц; Елена Хлудова; Борис Бутаков; Фаина Епифанова
Camera Operator	Yelena Petrova	Елена Петрова
Executive Producer	G. Kruglikov	Г. Кругликов
Composer	Nikita Bogoslovsky	Никита Богословский
Sound Operator	Nikolai Prilutskiy	Николай Прилуцкий
Script Editor	Z. Pavlova	З. Павлова
Voice Actors	Valentina Sperantova; Mikhail Yanshin; Serafima Birman; Lev Sverdlin; Serafim Anikeyev; Georgy Vitsin; Vladimir Gotovtsev; Vladimir Lepko; Sergey Martinson; Georgy Millyar; Galina Novozhilova; Andrei Tutyshkin; Sergei Tseits; Erast Garin; Lidiya Korolyova; Yuri Khrzhanovsky; Aleksandr Baranov	Валентина Сперантова; Михаил Яншин; Серафима Бирман; Лев Свердлин; Серафим Аникеев; Георгий Вицин; Владимир Готовцев; Владимир Лепко; Сергей Мартинсон; Георгий Милляр; Галина Новожилова; Андрей Тутышкин; Сергей Цейц; Эраст Гарин; Лидия Королёва; Юрий Хржановский; Александр Баранов

== Creation history ==
This full-length scenario corresponds to Mikhail Volpin and Nikolai Erdman's initial scenario offered for statement in 1947 and from the very beginning broken into two parts (perhaps, because of installation of the minister of cinematography I. G. Bolshakov on short animated films). The first part was quickly started in production, and the second is met by the negative review: "the scenario department doesn't satisfy not only for the formal reasons (it is continuation of already quite finished scenario "Fedya Zaytsev"), but also on the substance of the development of a plot". The plot under the name "In the Lie Kingdom" was sent to completion, thus "Fedya Zaytsev" had to terminate not in recognition of the hero, and the open final assuming possibility of future continuation. However and the modified (politized) scenario was rejected in this connection, also "Fedya Zaytsev's" final changed.

Authors didn't leave the idea of a series of movies about Fedya Zaytsev which is warmed up by great success of the picturized first part. Erdman and Volpin wrote the scenario "Fedya Zaytsev at Dacha" according to which in 1955 sisters Brumberg shot the animated film The Island of Mistakes (however to the hero as a result changed a name).

To the scenario "In the Lie Kingdom" authors returned only to a heat of "thaw", however last thirteen years since the screen version of the first movie prompted to remove not simply continuation, and a remake for new generation – "in its present, not crumpled look". According to M. V. Romashova, "existence of the original and a remake – the extraordinary case, which analysis will allow to reveal ways of representation of the school world during social transformations".

== Interesting fact ==
- The tie of the second part has something in common with the animated film of the same authors "The island of mistakes" (1955) which originally thought as direct continuation of "Fedya Zaytsev": the coming to life drawings (which contrast of convention with realistic drawing of the main animation looked innovative reception) anticipate hit of the hero to the fantastic country. A peculiar sending to "The island of mistakes" is also casually the mentioned task about two trains.

== Video ==
In the mid-nineties the animated film is released on videotapes in collections of the best Soviet animated films Studio PRO Video and a videostudio "Soyuz". In 2003 the animated film is released in the collection "Hi, school!" Soyuz studio on VHS and DVD.

== See also ==
- History of Russian animation
