= Artemi Ayvazyan =

Armenian musician (1902–1975)

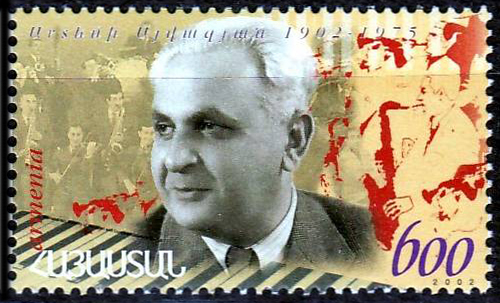
- Born: Artemi (Harutyun) Ayvazyan; June 26, 1902; Baku
- Died: November 14, 1975 (aged 73); Yerevan
- Occupations: composer, conductor
- Known for: Founder of the Armenian State Jazz Orchestra
- Awards: People's Artist of Armenia (1962)

Artemi (Harutyun) Ayvazyan (Armenian: Արտեմի Այվազյան, Russian: Артемий Айвазян; June 26, 1902 – November 14, 1975) was a Soviet Armenian composer, conductor, founder of the Armenian State Jazz Orchestra, and People's Artist of Armenia (1962).

== Biography ==
Ayvazyan was born in Baku to a musical family. Many famous musicians including Fyodor Shalyapin and Sergei Rachmaninoff visited the family apartment on Merkurievskaya Street.

Ayvazyan graduated from the Tbilisi State Conservatory in 1923 and studied at the studio of Alexander Spendiarian. He then attended the Moscow State Conservatory, completing his post-graduate research in 1935.

In 1933 Ayvazyan won the First Prize of All-Soviet musical competition.

In 1938 he founded the Armenian State Estrada (Jazz) Orchestra in Yerevan, one of the most popular in the USSR and the only one that survived during the stalinist repressions of the 1940s.

Among his well-known songs are "Jan Yerevan", "Karine", "Get Arax" and "Im Karavan", a melody which became the unofficial anthem of the Karabakh movement in Armenia in 1988. He is also the author of the Armenian operetta "The Eastern Dentist," (featuring the popular 'Taparnikos's Song') and soundtracks ("Inchu e aghmkum getn?", "Mor sirtn" Armenian films, "The Snow Queen" Soviet cartoon animation).

In 1939 Ayvazyan was awarded by the Renowned Master of Armenian SSR Arts title. He headed the Armenian State Estrada (Jazz) Orchestra until 1956. From 1943 to 1945, he was also the artistic head of Yerevan Musical Comedy Theater. Ayvazyan was the first professor of cello class at the Yerevan State Conservatory.

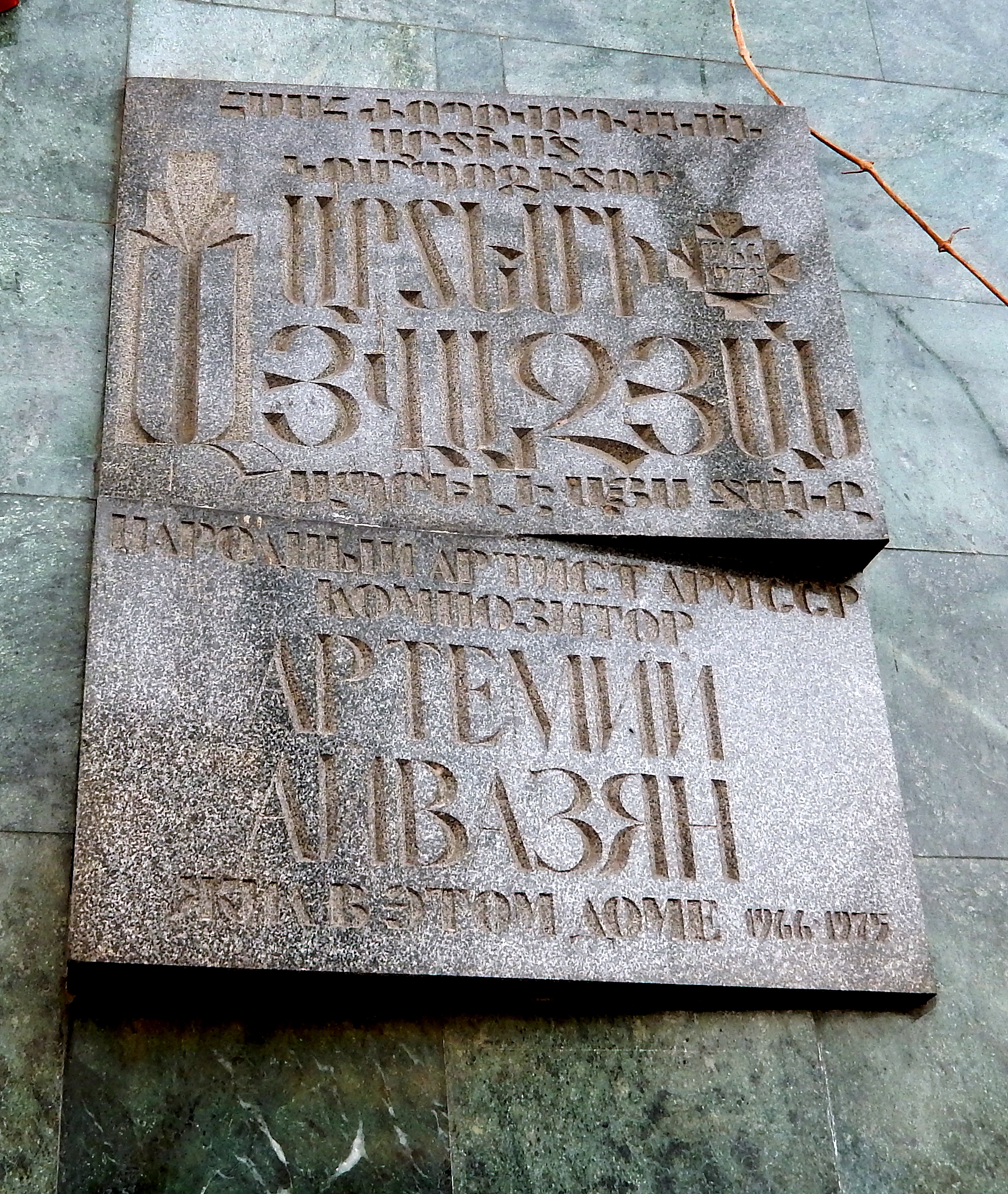

== Discography ==
- "Государственный эстрадный оркестр Армянской ССР" (1948)

== Filmography ==
- 1939 - The Priest and the Goat, animation
- 1957 - Mother's Heart
- 1957 - The Snow Queen
- 1958 - What's All the Noise of the River About?
- 1960 - A Poem about Armenia, doc.
- 1961 - Before the Dawn
- 1967 - Alexander Myasnikyan, doc.
- 1967 - Suren Spandaryan, doc.

== Sources ==
- Biography
- Ayvazyan's biography in Russian Jazz Encyclopedia
- Biography (in Russian)
- НЕЗАБЫВАЕМЫЕ МЕЛОДИИ АРТЕМИЯ АЙВАЗЯНА, ArmTown
