= The Snow Queen (1957 film) =

1957 Soviet animated musical fantasy film

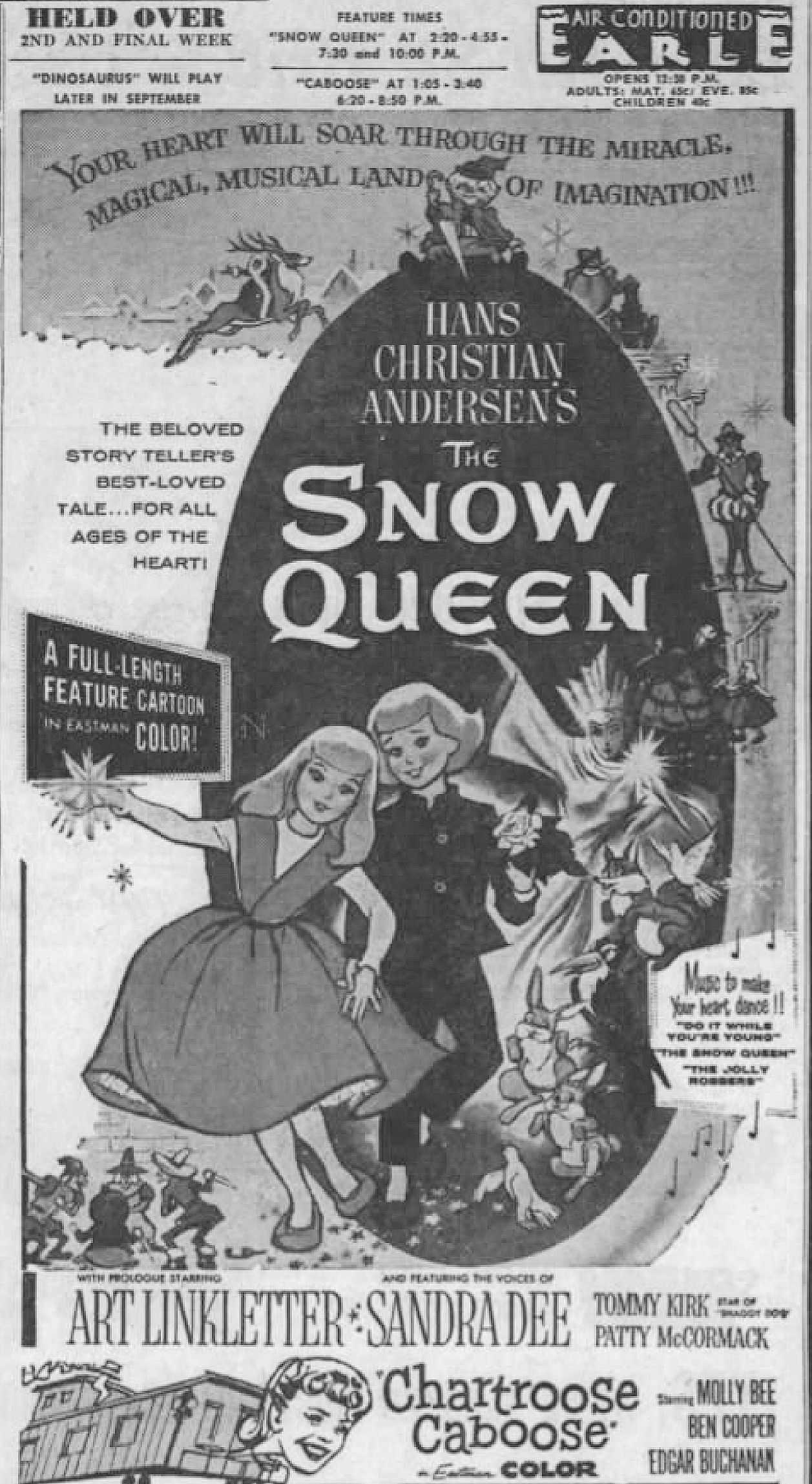
- American newspaper advertisement
- Directed by: Lev Atamanov
- Written by: Hans Christian Andersen (story); Nikolai Erdman; Lev Atamanov; Nikolay Zabolotsky (1957 lyrics); Georgy Grebner (ru)
- Based on: The Snow Queen by Hans Christian Andersen
- Produced by: Lev Atamanov
- Starring: See voices
- Edited by: Lidiya Kyaksht
- Music by: Artemi Ayvazyan
- Animation by: Alexander Vinokurov (ru); Leonid Shvartsman; Elizabeth Komova; Vladimir Krumin; Fyodor Khitruk; Renata Mirenkova (ru); Lydia A. Reztsova (ru); Igor Podgorsky (ru); Gennady Novozhilov (ru); Konstantin Chikin (ru)
- Production company: Soyuzmultfilm
- Distributed by: Universal-International (U.S.)
- Release date: 1 November 1957 (Soviet Union)
- Running time: 64 minutes
- Country: Soviet Union
- Language: Russian

The Snow Queen (Russian: Снежная королева, romanized: Snezhnaya Koroleva) is a 1957 Soviet animated musical fantasy film directed by Lev Atamanov. It is the ninth full-length animated production by Soyuzmultfilm and is based on the 1844 fable "The Snow Queen" by Hans Christian Andersen. The film is one of the earliest cinematic adaptations of the Scandinavian Danish fable since its publication in New Fairy Tales. First Volume. Second Collection.

The film was originally released in the Soviet Union on November 1, 1957. The film was re-released with an English soundtrack in 1959, 1993, and 1995. The film was translated into several major languages: English, German, French, Italian, Spanish, Finnish and Swedish. In 1959, at the height of the Cold War, Universal Pictures acquired the film for U.S. theatrical distribution (as the first animated film from Universal).

In foreign dubbings of The Snow Queen, popular actors were cast to play most characters. The Snow Queen was voiced by Russian actress Maria Babanova. Vladimir Gribkov (ru), Yanina Zhejmo, Sergey Martinson and Anna Komolova (ru) also were part of the voice cast.

The screenplay was written by Nikolai Erdman, Georgy Grebner (ru) and animation by Alexander Vinokurov (ru), Leonid Shvartsman, Elizabeth Komova, Vladimir Krumin and Fyodor Khitruk. After a 2007 Ghibli Museum Library release in Japan, an interview revealed that the dialogue, compositions, animation and themes of the film influenced Japanese animator Hayao Miyazaki. An HD film restoration re-release of The Snow Queen was published in Russia on 19 December 2020 by Soyuzmultfilm.

== Plot ==
Two young children, Kai and Gerda, listen to Gerda's grandmother as she tells them the legend of the Snow Queen. Kai jokes that if he met the Queen, he would put her on a hot stove, and melt her. The Snow Queen, who is watching the children in her magic mirror, becomes angry and smashes the mirror with her scepter. She enchants the ice splinters and sends a big snowstorm over the city. A rush of wind changes Kai's heart turning him cruel towards Gerda.

The next day, Kai ties his sled to the sleigh of the Snow Queen, who takes him into her arms as her willing captive. Gerda sets out for the Snow Queen's palace, determined not to give up until she has brought her friend back. Along the way, she meets a raven, "Mr. Corax" (Ancient Greek for "raven"). Gerda tells him that she is looking for a "good, kind, brave boy". Mr. Corax tells her that such a boy is now living at the palace of a princess. Mr. Corax takes Gerda to the palace to find his fiancée Henrietta, who knows the palace and can guide Gerda through it. The prince turns out not to be Kai, but he and the princess decide to help Gerda. They send Gerda on her way with a golden coach and attendants.

While the coach travels through a dark forest, a gang of robbers takes Gerda and strip the coach of its gold plate. The daughter of the robber chieftain shows Gerda her menagerie, which contains a reindeer from Lapland. The little robber, touched by Gerda's kindness, releases the girl along with the reindeer to search for Kai, and then frees all her captive animals.

Gerda and the reindeer arrive in Lapland, where a Lapp woman tells them that the Snow Queen had stopped there with Kai but went on farther north to Finland. She directs them to her cousin in Finland who can direct them further and writes a letter to her on a fish that she sends with Gerda and the reindeer.

The reindeer is unable to take Gerda up to the ice palace, so Gerda goes on alone. When Gerda finally gets to the palace through the blustery wind and snow, she encounters Kai. Kai rudely asks Gerda to leave, which brings her to tears. She hugs him, and her tears melt the shard of mirror in his heart. Kai cries, which causes a second shard to fall out of his eye, breaking the spell. When the Snow Queen returns to the palace, Gerda rebuffs her, and the Queen simply disappears, along with her Palace. The children return home happily, meeting all those who helped them reunite along the way.

== Release ==
=== Soviet theatrical release ===
Meeting of the Artistic Council on the film The Snow Queen with director Lev Atamanov presenting. Left column, second from right - Leonid Shvartsman, Alexander Vinokurov (ru)

The Snow Queen was released in the Soviet Union on 1 November 1957. The film is one of the first adaptations of the Danish fairy tale into cinematic media ever since the story was written by Andersen in New Fairy Tales. First Volume. Second Collection (1844). Previously playwright Evgeny Schwartz inspired by the Andersen's writing wrote an acclaimed children's play The Snow Queen that was staged in 1938. The film was released just a few days after the Soviet Union witnessed the world's first artificial satellite Sputnik 1 that launched in October 1957.

=== Cold War release ===
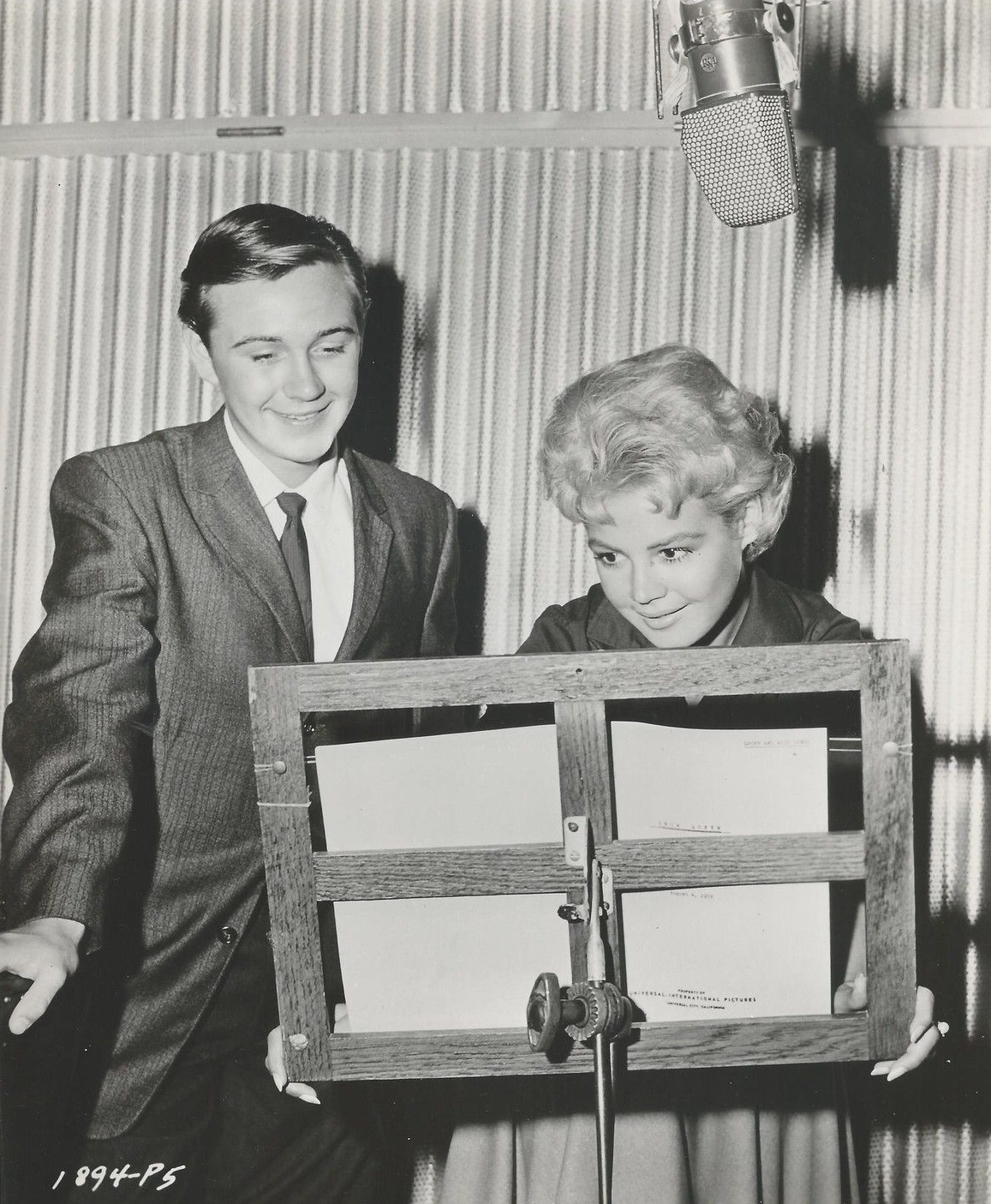
Tommy Kirk and Sandra Dee during recording for the English dub

In 1959, the film was dubbed into English and released by Universal Pictures with the voices of Sandra Dee and Tommy Kirk as Gerda and Kai. The film was introduced by a six-minute live-action Christmas prologue featuring TV personality Art Linkletter, as well as a two-minute montage. In the prologue, Linkletter recited the following rhyme just before the film began: "One snowflake two/three snowflakes four/And now you'll see 'The Snow Queen'/if you add a million more." The American version also contained an entirely rewritten musical score and had three new songs in English, two of which replaced the Russian songs (the other one was in the montage). Hollywood Russian composer Joseph Gershenson composed the score for the 1959 film.

A U.S. theatrical release of a film from the Soviet Union was a revolutionary moment in the history of the Cold War due to the geopolitical tension between the countries. At this time, the United States was committed to sustaining the Cold War. Under president Eisenhower, the New Look policy advised by Secretary of State John Foster Dulles called for resistance to cultural influences from the Soviet Union. The visit by Vice President Richard Nixon and Soviet leader Nikita Khrushchev to the American National Exhibition on 24 July 1959 was supposed to lower Cold War tensions by opening cultural exchanges across the two nations, though their discussion at the exhibition became known as the Kitchen Debate. During this cultural rapprochement, leaders were aware of secret U-2 incursions into USSR airspace. Despite the Domino Theory The Snow Queen raised the iron curtain, by becoming the first purchase of a Soviet film by any major American company. M.J.P. Enterprises sold the rights of the movie to Universal for a reported fee of $30,000. It became Universal Pictures' first theatrical animated feature film. Universal had been distributing the output of Walter Lantz since 1929, with Lantz having proposed a feature film based on the story of Aladdin which, should it have been finished, would’ve been Universal's first animated film. On 7 June 1959, The New York Times reported Universal's plan for a major release across Canada and the U.S. for an English dub of the film with an added prologue. In June 1959, The Hollywood Reporter noted that, in order to allow Universal to release the picture in America, Walt Disney and Samuel Goldwyn both waived the rights they held with the MPAA to the title "The Snow Queen." The film entered the Vancouver International Film Festival on 3 August 1959 and Universal ran the picture at the San Francisco International Film Festival in November 1959.

The film's general release was initially planned for the 1959 holidays. However, Columbia's animated feature 1001 Arabian Nights was scheduled for a December release. Therefore, its wide release started in the United States on 20 November 1959.

In Washington, D.C., in April 1960, Idaho Democratic Senator Frank Church hosted an invitational screening of the film at the Motion Picture Association headquarters in Washington D.C, attended by the Ambassador of Denmark. There the film was applauded for its literary appeal to the city's many Danish residents and because its animation techniques resembled those used by Disney. With many adaptations following the release, the 1959 version is the definitive version for the 1960s audience. Many boomers from America remember the festive TV season featuring The Snow Queen.

Variety estimated The Snow Queen and another Soviet import, The Sword and the Dragon earned an estimated $1.3 million in the US.

=== VHS Release ===
In 1985, Jim Terry produced an English dub that was released by Celebrity Home Entertainment in 1993. The theme song for the dub was provided by Bullets. The main characters Gerda and Kai's names were changed to Yvette and John.

In 1995, there was a second international release that was restored and re-voiced by the Films by Jove company which was run by Oleg Vidov. They restored the film and created a new English soundtrack for it, featuring the voices of Kathleen Turner, Mickey Rooney, Kirsten Dunst and Laura San Giacomo. It was shown on television as part of the "Mikhail Baryshnikov's Stories from My Childhood series, and was later released on video and DVD in 1999. French and Spanish soundtracks were added for the DVD version, with the French soundtrack featuring Catherine Deneuve and the Spanish track featuring Beatriz Aguirre. Following criticism of the non-inclusion of the Russian-language soundtrack on the DVD, Films by Jove also released a DVD of the film containing the original Russian-language soundtrack with English subtitles sometime in 2006.

== Home media release ==
The Snow Queen

- Wendros (Sweden) - VHS - Pal - Snödrottningen (with Swedish audio)
- Films by Jove, April 27, 1999 (R0, NTSC) – version restored by Films by Jove in the 1990s. Contains English, French and Spanish soundtracks (not Russian), no subtitles. Included films: The Snow Queen, The Wild Swans, Alice and the Mystery of the Third Planet
- Krupnyy Plan, September 13, 2004 (R5, PAL) – version restored by Krupnyy Plan ("full restoration of image and sound"). Contains original Russian soundtrack, no subtitles. Included films: The Snow Queen, New Years' Eve (1948). Other features: Before and after restoration, photo album, previews. Glitch: rewinding/fast-forwarding only by chapters
- Westlake Entertainment Group, October 1, 2004 (R1, NTSC). Contains complete 1959 version of the film, but unrestored.
- Films by Jove, 2006 (R0, NTSC) – version restored by Films by Jove in the 1990s. Contains original Russian soundtrack with English subtitles. Included films: The Snow Queen, The Golden Antelope, Bench, Cyclist, Fence
- Ghibli Museum Library - December 2007 Japan - (original Russian audio, Japanese subtitles)
- Soyuzmultfilm Golden Collection HD, 19 December 2020 (Russian)
- Deaf Crocodile Films, September 30, 2025 (Blu-ray). Also includes The Scarlet Flower and The Key.

== Creators ==
	English	Russian
Director	Lev Atamanov Nikolay Fyodorov (uncredited in 1959); Phil Patton (1959 only)	Лев Атаманов Николай Фёдоров
Story	Hans Christian Andersen	Ганс Христиан Андерсен
Scenario	Nikolai Erdman; Lev Atamanov; Georgy Grebner (uncredited in 1959)	Николай Эрдман; Лев Атаманов; Георгий Гребнер
Writers (1959 only)	Bob Fisher; Alan Lipscott	
Art Directors	Leonid Shvartsman; Alexander Vinokurov	Леонид Шварцман; Александр Винокуров
Artists	Dmitriy Anpilov; O. Gemmerling; Irina Svetlitsa; Pyotr Korobayev	Дмитрий Анпилов; О. Геммерлинг; Ирина Светлица; Пётр Коробаев
Animators	Lidiya Reztsova; Renata Mirenkova; Yelena Khludova; Gennadiy Novozhilov; Konstantin Chikin; Yelizaveta Komova; Vadim Dolgikh; Tatyana Fyodorova; Vladimir Krumin; Fyodor Khitruk; Viktor Lihachev; Igor Podgorskiy	Лидия Резцова; Рената Миренкова; Елена Хлудова; Геннадий Новожилов; Константин Чикин; Елизавета Комова; Вадим Долгих; Татьяна Фёдорова; Владимир Крумин; Фёдор Хитрук; Виктор Лихачев; Игорь Подгорский
Camera Operator	Mikhail Druyan	Михаил Друян
Executive Producer	Fyodor Ivanov	Фёдор Иванов
Composer	Artemi Ayvazyan (original version only); Joseph Gershenson (1959 only); Frank Skinner (1959 only)	Артемий Айвазян
Sound Operator	Nikolai Prilutskiy	Николай Прилуцкий
Editor	Lidiya Kyaksht (1957 only); Hugo Grimaldi (1959 only)	Лидия Кякшт
Lyrics	Nikolay Zabolotsky (1957 only); Mikhail Svetlov (1957 only)	Николай Заболоцкий; М. Светлов

=== Voices ===
Character	Original version (Russian)	1959 Universal version (English)	1985 Jim Terry version (English)	1995 Jove Films version (English)	German version	Swedish version
Ol Dreamy (Оле-Лукойе)	Vladimir Gribkov (Владимир Грибков)	Paul Frees	Jan Rabson	Mickey Rooney	Paul Lewitt	Hans Lindgren
A small wizard who helps you fall asleep.
Gerda (Ivett) (Герда)	Yanina Zhejmo (Янина Жеймо)	Sandra Dee	Barbara Goodson	Kirsten Dunst	Heidi Weigelt	Gunilla Larsen
A girl who thinks of Kai wholeheartedly. Goes on a journey in search of the kidnapped Kai.
Kai (John) (Кай)	Anna Komolova (Анна Комолова)	Tommy Kirk	Mona Marshall	David Morse	Hartmut Becker	Agneta Bolme-Börjefors
A childhood friend and sweetheart of Gerda. A piece of ice pierces his eyes and the heart, turning it into a cold heart.
The Snow Queen (Снежная королева)	Maria Babanova (Мария Бабанова)	Louise Arthur	Mona Marshall	Kathleen Turner	Maria Kühne	Marina Bennet
Queen and ruler of the Winter World. Lives in the ice palace of the Northern Country.
The Robber Girl (Shee) (Маленькая разбойница)	Galina Kozhakina (Галина Кожакина)	Patty McCormack	Mona Marshall	Laura San Giacomo	Erica Trumpf	Gunilla Larsen
The daughter of the bandits who attacked Gerda in the middle of the journey.
The Princess (Принцесса)	Tatiana Linnik (Татьяна Линник)	Joyce Terry	Mona Marshall	Lalainia Lindbjerg		Gunilla Larsen
Finnish Woman (Финка)	Maria Sinelnikova (Мария Синельникова)	June Foray	Mona Marshall	Shirley Millner		
The Raven (Ворон)	Sergey Martinson (Сергей Мартинсон)	Paul Frees	Jan Rabson	Donald Bishop	Hannes W. Braun	Sten Carlberg
Court Raven (female) (Ворона)	Yelena Ponsova (Елена Понсова)	June Foray	Mona Marshall	Kathleen Barr		Gunnel Odén
The Prince (Принц)	Vera Bendina (Вера Бендина)	Dick Beals	Jan Rabson	Jason Gray-Stanford		Gunnel Odén
Old Robber (female) (Старая разбойница)	Yudif Glizer (Юдифь Глизер)	June Foray	Mona Marshall	Don Brown		Maude Adelson
Laplander Woman (Лапландка)	Yudif Glizer (Юдифь Глизер)	June Foray	Mona Marshall	Kathleen Barr		
Granny (Бабушка)	Vera Popova (Вера Попова)	Lillian Buyeff	Mona Marshall	Maxine Miller	Bella Waldritter	Maude Adelson
Deer (Олень)	Aleksey Konsovsky (Алексей Консовский)	Paul Frees	Jan Rabson	Don Brown		Sten Carlberg
Old Fairy (Старая фея)	Irina Murzaeva (Ирина Мурзаева)	June Foray	Mona Marshall	Kathleen Barr		
Christmas prologue	n/a	Art Linkletter; Billy Booth; Rickey Busch; Jennie Lynn; Tammy Marihugh	n/a	n/a	n/a	n/a

== Animation ==
=== Development ===
Prominent Soviet artists took part in the creation of The Snow Queen film that used traditional hand-drawn animation. The makers of The Scarlet Flower, Golden Antelope (1954 Film) and Dog and Cat (1955 Film) joined to create the various settings such as the Northern German town, the Royal castle, the robber's cave and the snowy expanses of the Queen's domain into one united fairy tale film. Russian poet and children's writer Nikolay Zabolotsky wrote the poems for the soundtrack. Playwright Nikolai Erdman was one of the script writers. The fairy tale deviated slightly from Andersen's story by editing out the religious undertones as well as time-based events of the characters such as Raven's old age and the litter robber, Gerda and Kai turning into adults. However, the script is similar to Andersen's fairy tale in the utilization of the frame story. The character Ole Lukøje the dreamer narrates the story of Gerda in a Nordic town under a "slumberella." The script also narrates Gerda's quest to rescue Kai in a series of scenarios or chapters exactly as the format in the fairy tale.

Animators Alexander Vinokurov (ru) created the world of The Snow Queen, Leonid Shvartsman created the characters, while Fyodor Khitruk brought to life two characters – Ole Lukøje and the Snow Queen. The team was held in place by the direction of Lev Atamanov. Fyodor Khitruk later recalled bringing to life the character Ole Lukoye, as one of the most significant characters of the two hundred characters he animated over his many years of practice.

According to the memoirs of Leonid Shvartsman the animators found new hope for the animation industry after the Khruschev Thaw era began. Initially, they thought of drawing inspiration by going to Copenhagen in Denmark, the land where Andersen wrote New Fairy Tales. First Volume. Second Collection (1844). However the route to Western Europe and the Danish lands was closed in the mid-1950s due to the iron curtain. As an alternative, they went to Riga, Tallinn and Tartu along the Baltic states. A stay of two weeks drawing the streets and corners of the towns provided the groundwork for production of the film. The city square in the film is modeled after the city of Tallinn. From the fall of 1955 to the early summer of 1956 storyboards were prepared. It took a year and a half to complete the film. In 1956, before the release of The Snow Queen, the artists released a series of postcards of the drawings related to this event.

=== Character design ===
The animators took a new approach to drawing the Snow Queen. They emphasized the spectral presence of the Snow Queen by using the animation technique known as rotoscoping or "éclair" named after the table manufacturer company of the same name. Éclair used an epidiascope that would be fixed on one side of a furniture equipment provided by furniture company Éclair and the screen projector was fixed on the other side. As one of the acclaimed actress of Soviet Union, Maria Babanova and a few other cast members was cinematographically filmed as if the actors are in live performance with makeup and costume. Then the film footage is transferred to celluloid with some corrections. The role of the Snow Queen would resemble the mannerisms and unique qualities of the actress as the film footage is translated into frame-by-frame drawings. Yanina Zhejmo, acclaimed actress of the Russian musical Cinderella (1947) got the role to play Gerda.

According to Leonid Shvartsman work for The Snow Queen lasted two years. The animators researched at the Lenin Library. The studio would be filled with thousands of drawings every day that had to be checked and corrected. Shvartsman explains as one of the creators of the Snow Queen, she was supposed to represent cold beauty of the ice world - "In this case, there was no prototype. I imagined a majestic, cold beauty." The character was modeled as if sculpted by stone. Additionally, Maria Babanova's voice became a fitting addition to the character the Snow Queen. The character Ole Lukøje was first based on the seven dwarfs in the film Snow White. However, Shvartsman later drew the character as a caricature of director Lev Atamanov. According to the animator, the most exciting concept about character animation is how the pencil leads the hand to different rough drafts that eventually shape into a new character.

Akagi Kanzaki, children's literature critic of Japan, stated the "gradations of the various blues are exquisite and beautiful" featured in the episode at the snow palace. Also Kanzaki pointed out the "movements of the people are calculated very well, especially since it is coming from a country known for classical ballet!" The animators explained the finale, when the characters Gerda and Kai set off back to their homeland on a reindeer and greet all the people is a homage by the animators to the Russian people.

Takuya Mori for the Eiga Hyouron (Film Criticism) stated The Snow Queen is similar to the films of Disney. However, the animation rebounds to new levels compared to Disney's precedent Snow White and the Seven Dwarfs. Both films employed the use of painterly backgrounds and flat planes. One way Soyuzmultfilm's The Snow Queen differs from Disney productions is through their depiction of death or elements of suffering. The insertions give The Snow Queen juxtapositions of the grotesque and the charm of an original fairy tale story. The depictions aren't intended to be disturbing. In order to emphasize the innocent nature of the film, all the antagonists including the Snow Queen are depicted as people who never become malevolent.

=== The animation of Lev Atamanov ===
Lev Atamanov, the animation director for The Snow Queen created a new form of animation that emphasized the fairy tale qualities (Russian: сказочность, romanized: Skazochnost') and artistry of animation (Russian: условность, romanized: Uslovnost’). Rather than completely fill the frames with photo realistic representations of the world by using the rotoscoping technique known as éclair widely used by Disney, Atamanov and the Soviet animators presented the world through the lens of artistic creativity and the subtle qualities that differentiate the magical qualities of animation from the real world. The film used minimal rotoscoping only used for the Snow Queen and a few other characters. Instead the animation style emphasized creativity. Atamanov states for a fairy tale film like The Snow Queen, it is imperative to retain skazochnost': "Animation is characterized by wide generalization, careful selection and, most importantly, grotesque exaggeration. Therein lies its power, its genuine realism. By breaking the laws of art, we inevitably slip into tired verisimilitude, which we often attempt to pass off as realism, even though it has nothing to do with either the truth of art or the truth of life."

Atamanov also is keen to retain uslovnost’ or the artistry of animation of an animation frame by focusing on the aspects of the background or characters and exploring new traits within the frame that disassociates itself from its exact representation in the world. The animators elicits emotions into the frames such as removing shadows from the faces and bringing new dimensions to the characters such as the Snow Queen's henchmen drawn in toy-like fashion.

== Awards ==
The film has won many international awards including the Golden Lion at the Venice Film Festival and the animation award at the Cannes Film Festival.

- 1957—Venice Film Festival: Golden Lion in the animated film category
- First Prize at the International Film Festival for Children and Youth in Venice
- 1958—Cannes Film Festival: First prize in the animated film category
- 1958—Rome: First prize
- 1958—Moscow International Film Festival: Special prize
- 1959—London (Festival of festivals): Prize for best film of year
- 2003—International Laputa Animation Film Festival - Tokyo, Japan: 17th best Animated Film in History
- 2006—Komsomolskaya Pravda rating of the ten best cartoons in Russia

== Themes ==
The central theme of the film is how "even an icy heart can be melted." Only the main character Gerda is capable of wielding this power of reconciliation and repentance as she roams the icy lands of the Snow Queen to save her kidnapped friend. A metaphor that relates to the theme of reconciliation is when the character robber, a short-tempered animal hunter of deer, hares, foxes meets Gerda. The little robber, amazed by Gerda's kindness, releases the girl along with the reindeer, and then frees all her captive animals.

The film juxtaposes Gerda's purity with macabre elements in two episodes where Gerda meets the magician at the garden of eternal summer and Gerda's misadventure with Mr. Corax the raven. The film's central conflict revolves around the power of love and purity solving the problem of the detachment of the soul. The conflict is described at the meeting of the characters Gerda and Kai at the snow palace, where Kai remarks at the snow polygons and states, "beautiful, they are more beautiful than real flowers!" The film's array of miracles has a finale with the last one emphasizing the theme that the power of life overcomes death.

The film delve on the power of catharsis and emotions to dissipate the troubles and challenges facing society. The emotional effects of love and tears are used as the primary tools of defense by the protagonists as Kai's tears are able to dislodge the glass splinter and Gerda's love causes the Snow Queen to flee back to the snowy lands. Furthermore, a critique from Eiga Hyouron in Japan, stated what the film lacks in comedy is supplemented by a poetic exhibition of Russian animation. The reviewer finds the film is like Russia is trying to "yearn for Spring" through the powerful effects of "single-minded love" against the snow.

== Reception ==
Film critic L. Zakrzhevskaya argued that the cartoon The Snow Queen is certainly one of the best examples of world classic animation. Soviet animation director Ivan Ivanov-Vano wrote that "the film The Snow Queen is one of the masterpieces of our cartoon classics." The New York Times reviewer Bosley Crowther for the 1960 release of the film in United States was at first surprised that the film is from the Soviet Union and later is astounded by the similarity of Soyuzmultfilm's animation techniques with those of Disney studio. The review states, "To look at and listen to 'The Snow Queen,' which arrived in neighborhood theaters yesterday, you would never dream that this color cartoon feature was made in a Soviet Union studio." The reviewer reasoned that the "Russians love a hopeful fairy tale, tinged with white doves and bouncy bunny rabbits, as much as anyone at the Disney studio." The review stated the film had the same qualities as Snow White and the Seven Dwarfs.

German review at Die Nacht der lebenden Texte stated, "Fairy tale adaptation from the Soviet Union is a beautiful old-fashioned color on the children's film shelf." Review at Fantastic Movie Musings and Ramblings, state, "This Russian animated movie version of a Hans Christian Andersen tale does that very well, and though I’ve heard that it's better in its original language, the dubbed American version is very effective." Flickers in Time review state, "This is a beautifully animated retelling of the Hans Christian Andersen fairy tale." Sabrina Crivelli of Il Cineocchio reviews stated out of all The Snow Queen adaptations, Lev Atamanov's "Soviet one remained faithful to her in plot and spirit, and details are far from indifferent." The reviewer also applauded the film's juxtapositions of the different characters including Gerda take on a spectral tone: "On the other hand, it is precisely this that makes The Snow Queen so poetic, the ability to trace through the wonderful drawings by, among others, made by the great Fyodor Khitruk; the extreme beauty – and ugliness – of the creation, the continuous contradictions that characterize human existence."

Reviewers and critics from Japan had positive reviews for the film. Takuya Mori for the Eiga Hyouron (Film Criticism) emphasized the Japanese viewpoint of the film once it released in 1960. The critique of the film in ‘The Genealogy of Soviet Animated Films: Focus on the Masterpiece The Snow Queen’ stated Mori was moved by the animation despite seeing the film in a black and white television screen:

"The Snow Queen, I will daringly call it a gem – one that was first entrenched in Walt Disney, but then melted, and from which a new, single crystal was extracted. This is no longer something borrowed from America. It lacks comedic gags, and even a sense of rhythm, but this is no drawback, for gags and rhythm are not necessary to produce physiological pleasure . . . In the clear air of our neighbor to the North, the climate is harsh. But it is exactly the theme of this story that is able to melt snow with a single-minded love . . .and this because she [Russia] yearns for Spring."

Ghibli Museum Library states the movie is akin to a myth: "This work, which was produced under the auspices of the Soviet government at the time and in a system unrelated to commercialism, is a solid story structure that focuses only on Gerda, the main character, by removing useless episodes, and it is also likely that the interpretation unique to Russia is projected, such as the idea of animism and reverence for nature. Even though it is a work of the previous 50 years, it still does not lose its luster."

Akagi Kanzaki, children's literature critic of Japan stated the film adaptation is clear and coherent along many fronts in comparison to Andersen's story: "Therefore, the story is much more consistent and clearer than the Andersen version." The detour of Gerda's original sedate personality to a courageous determined one was a new innovation that the reviewer thought, "will be the starting point for Miyazaki anime." The reviewer found the episode where Gerda encounters the bandits was an episode that clearly delineated Andersen's thought process as he wrote the fairy tale. Singer songwriter Hiroko Taniyama says the film delves into philosophical narratives that is surprising for a fifty-year old Soviet film. Taniyama also stated based on animation the use of green and red colors were astounding and the animation was flowing "like waves."

== Influence ==
=== Critical response in Japan ===
“"Snedroningen is proof of how much love can be invested in the act of making drawings move, and how much the movement of drawings can be subliminated into the process of acting. It proves that when it comes to depicting simple yet strong, powerful, piercing emotions in an earnest and pure fashion, animation can fully hold its own with the best of what other media genres can offer, moving us powerfully."”

— Animator Hayao Miyazaki on the nuances of the animation of the film The Snow Queen

Shortly after the release of Snezhnaya Koroleva in Russia, the film received warm response from the Japanese audience. Released as Yuki no Joou in 1960, the film screened in Japan via film distributors tied with the Soviet Union and screened in television. An elite Japanese film journal Eiga Hyouron (Film Criticism) devoted a record fourteen pages for the film critique.

For many years the film aired on TV on New Year's holidays in Japan. Animator Hayao Miyazaki saw the film while he was at the union at Toei Animation. Hayao Miyazaki stated that this film is one of his inspirations. When he started his career, Miyazaki had a rough start and was thinking of leaving animation. When he saw The Snow Queen, it inspired him to continue working in animation.

The Soviet film is said to be Miyazaki's true inspiration for animation as Miyazaki himself claimed, "The Snow Queen is my destiny and my favorite film." According to Miyazaki, Japanese animation was starting to develop at that time period. Therefore, Miyazaki was moved by the animation techniques of The Snow Queen such as the snow swirling in the distance or waves crashing at the ice palace. Miyazaki's inspiration quotation states, "I started working as a new animator for Toei Animation in 1963, but I frankly didn't enjoy my job at all. I felt ill at ease every day – I couldn't understand the works we were producing, or even the proposals we were working on . . . Had I not one day seen Snedronningen (The Snow Queen) during a film screening hosted by the company labor union, I honestly doubt that I would have continued working as an animator."

One of the metaphors of the film is the interaction of nature and its hosts, depicted by Gerda sacrificing her shoes to the river

In September 2007, it was announced that Studio Ghibli will be distributing The Snow Queen through their Ghibli Museum Library label and it was released in December 2007 (in the original Russian audio with Japanese subtitles). The same time Ghibli released The Snow Queen, they also released the 1976 film The Steadfast Tin Soldier by Lev Milchin. Ghibli Museum stated, "It is not an exaggeration to say that the starting point of Hayao Miyazaki is here (The Snow Queen)."

In a 2007 interview, Miyazaki stated the film's animation, story, and language greatly influenced his training and work. The symbolism and metaphors of the film particularly stood out to the animator. Miyazaki noted that the scene when Gerda goes to the barren lands to help Kai while barefoot represents the purity of Gerda's soul. Miyazaki particularly liked how the creators mixed myths and fairy tales in the film. According to Miyazaki, the story of the barefoot heroine giving up her shoes to the river is the embodiment of an ideal hero or heroine who sacrifices for other's sake. Furthermore, the animator asserts animation is animism. As a testament to this theory, Miyazaki recounts the scene in the film when the boat magically unties and floats back when Gerda gave her shoes to the river. Miyazaki concluded the interview by stating, he is working on an animated film whose character Ponyo is similar to Gerda who will be featured in the film of the same name.

In a 2021 interview Hayao Miyazaki cited The Snow Queen as an influence.

==== Similarities with Princess Mononoke ====
===== Characters =====
The 1997 Japanese award-winning film Princess Mononoke stands out as Miyazaki's version of The Snow Queen. According to research in the anthology Introducing Studio Ghibli's Monster Princess: From Mononokehime to Princess Mononoke by film historian Julia Alekseyeva, many familiar patterns are apparent between the two films. Both films try to exhibit "emotional and affective realism." Affective realism was an innovative take on animation in the twentieth century that emphasize the exhibition of emotions. Many of the characters in Princess Mononoke have an uncanny and spectral uniformity to the characters in The Snow Queen. Princess Mononoke can be seen as a tribute by Miyazaki to the Soviet Union film.

Princess Mononoke, the Muromachi period epic film of young Emishi prince Ashitaka is similar to The Snow Queen by the depiction of its characters. Out of all the similarities, the eponymous character San, of Princess Mononoke stands out as the direct link to The Snow Queen. San who is depicted as a young woman who was raised by the wolves and is isolated from humans, but eventually comes to take care of the main character Ashitaka. San is a direct link to the robber girl in The Snow Queen, who is described as the warden of captured wild animals who takes care of Gerda. In terms of appearance the "short, dark hair in disarray, stern expressions, and dark eyes" of both characters as well as their mannerisms is similar to an inhabitant of the wilderness. Despite their background and unsympathetic, serious nature both characters are willing to help the protagonists.

Other similarities include the characteristics between Lady Eboshi and the Snow Queen. Both queens are drawn to be tall and their beauty is emphasized. The Snow Queen has heavily painted eyes and eyelashes and Lady Eboshi has her characteristic red lipstick. The Snow Queen's cast of female side characters such as the robber girl or the female raven represent strong-willed, steadfast, virtuous characteristics and is seen as a new aspect in twentieth century animation. Miyazaki would apply this viewpoint into his craft evidenced by the many films that feature heroines. In The Snow Queen, the arctic reindeer who carries Gerda in the Laplands is similar to Ashitaka's faithful steed, the red elk Yakul in Princess Mononoke.

===== Thematic comparisons =====
Thematically, both protagonists of the film, San and Gerda are characterized as stewards of nature while at the same time being human. The concept is explored in Princess Mononoke when San or Mononokehime in Japanese meaning ‘spirit princess’ can directly communicate with animals. Another similar characteristic is when Ashitaka the prince also has the ability to be in harmony with the nature's inhabitants. The concept is explored In The Snow Queen, when the film portrays Gerda as a traveler who couldn't have reached the snow palace if it weren't for her harmonious communication with all the animals of the forest such as swallows, goats, crows, doves and reindeer. The scene when she offers her shoes to the river and the river guides her to the correct path emphasizes the cognition of nature towards its hosts.

The antagonists of both films are never depicted as violent beings, but only as misguided characters. The concept is explored in The Snow Queen, when the queen keeps Kai safe in the palace. In Princess Mononoke, the concept is explored when Lady Eboshi gives care to the lepers whom she employs as gunsmiths. Both Hayao Miyazaki and Lev Atamanov shared the same vision of animation. They treated animation as a medium to move the audience based on the inherent artistry of an animation frame. They tried to unearth the skazochnost' of a frame such as a sequence in a ballet dance.

Both films depict the subtle difference between children and adults. Both directors of the films emphasize the extraordinary abilities that children have in comparison to the ordinary lifestyle of adults imposed by the rule of law and order. Gerda uses animism as a means to continue on the journey. The theme is a reference to another of Ghibli's productions, House Hunting. House Hunting the movie, follows the journeys of an ambitious preteen girl, Fuki who strolls in the Japanese wilderness. The story line of the film that describes how Fuki's childish rituals such as offerings of food and gifts to nature that converts the threatening places to friendly havens is similar to the scene in The Snow Queen where Gerda offers her shoes to the river. Both film depict nature has a tendency to connect and aid both the protagonists on their journey. Both stories highlight the sublime qualities of children behavior that otherwise would be considered unrealistic in a world of law. For a fairy tale report by Komsomolskaya Pravda, psychologist Oksana Tsevtkova states many children unlike adults perceive fairy tales such as The Snow Queen into the realm of fantasy without rationalizing the exact nature of the fairy tale into reality. Children often find the fairy tales as simply happy entertainment.

== Legacy ==
The Snow Queen became one of the pillars in the twentieth century animation industry. According to Kino-expert, it is the most popular Soviet animation that stands alongside other legends that include Nu, Pogodi! (Well, Just You Wait!). The film was not only well received by children and adults in Russia but has also been translated into English, French, German, Italian, Spanish etc. It is arguably the most famous Soviet cartoon outside the Soviet Union. One testament to its popularity is its influence in the United States in the 1950s and 1960s. The film would air in the Christmas and new year television prime time slots.

Ballet dancer Mikhail Baryshnikov included the cartoon in his list of favorite cartoon; published in the autobiography, Stories From My Childhood. Literary critic Stas Tyrkin compiled a list of the fifteen best full-length cartoons and The Snow Queen became part of the list. Komsomolskaya Pravda rating of the ten best cartoons in Russia compiled from a survey of cinematic media website stores nominated The Snow Queen as part of its rankings. Ministry of Culture listed the film as one of fifty recommended cartoons to watch for schoolchildren.

=== 21st century influence ===
The film's legacy is entrenched to the 21st century through its recognition at the 2003 International Laputo Animation Film Festival held in Tokyo, Japan. Over 140 animators and film critics compiled a list of the 150 best animated films of the world. The Snow Queen became the 17th best animated film with the best film being the Russian film Hedgehog in the Fog.

On 23 December 2011, the state gallery on Solyanka, Russia opened an exhibition, The Snow Queen 55-Cold and Beauty dedicated to the 55th anniversary of the release of the film and the 90th anniversary of one of its creators Alexander Vinokurov. On 6 October 2012, there was an original 35 mm film widescreen release in the cinema "Neva" in Russia. Director Lev Atamanov's daughter Anna Lvovna Atamanova attended the exhibition that included screenings of rare sketches for the cartoon. The event was organized by Big Cartoon Festival and the State Film Museum. In 2013, Big Cartoon Festival hosted sketches of the film as part of the 100th anniversary of Russian animation. The exhibition also toured Japanese cities.

In 2015, TV Magazine Russia listed the film as a classic of the USSR cinema industry. In 2020, they also compiled a list of the most famous Russian films of the twentieth century outside Russia, and The Snow Queen was on the list. In 2020, Maria Lemesheva, Editor-in-Chief and editorial director of Kinoreporter magazine compiled a list of five acclaimed cartoons for Children's Day and The Snow Queen was one of them.

High Definition film restoration re-release poster for The Snow Queen from the Golden Collection by Soyuzmultfilm, United Network "Cinema Park", "Formula Kino" and Kino Teatr

In 2018, Soyuzmultfilm restored the video quality of The Snow Queen as part of its grand project to restore films from its Golden Collection. Archivists restored the film manually: carefully digitized the original film negative, cleaned every frame that had dust, scratches, tears. They also used rotoscoping technology, in which characters are separated from the background for separate cleaning and restoration of all elements of the frame. Yandex partnered with Soyuzmutlfilm to apply a new Russian technology to the archive cinema reels. A neural network restoration technology was used to increase the sharpness and resolution of the frames. The film stock were renewed with all the film grain and extra flickering dots removed. The side by side comparison of a frame of The Snow Queen was shown. The restored Golden Collection films including The Snow Queen was released to the theaters on 5 December 2020. The HD revival screenings are distributed by United Network "Cinema Park."

Russia honored the People's Artist of Russia animator for the film, Leonid Shvartsman on 30 August 2020 on his 100th year birthday milestone. Interviews from TASS as well as Kino Teatr gave the readers insight into the history of the animator whose work not only spans The Snow Queen but also Cheburashka. Shvartsman explained that he is pleased by the popularity of The Snow Queen in audiences to this day. With the support of the Ministry of Culture an exhibition dedicated to the centennial of the animator, opened in Saint Petersburg at the Berthold Center on 28 November 2020.

== See also ==
- History of Russian animation
- List of animated feature films of the 1950s
- The Snow Queen (1967 film)
- Frozen (2013 film) Disney film inspired by The Snow Queen

== Bibliography ==
- Alekseyeva, Julia (2018). "Spirit Princess and Snow Queen: The Soviet Roots of Princess Mononoke". In Denison, Rayna (ed.). Princess Mononoke: Understanding Studio Ghibli's Monster Princess. Bloomsbury Academic. ISBN 978-1-5013-2976-0.
- Zakrzhevskaya, L (1972). Babichenko, D. N. (ed.). Мастера советской мультипликации. Сборник статей [Masters of Soviet Animation. Collection of Articles] (in Russian). Moscow: Iskusstvo. pp. 9–23.– 191.
- Ivanov-Vano, Ivan Petrovich (1980). Кадр за кадром [Frame by Frame] (in Russian). Moscow: Iskusstvo. pp. 224–240.
- Miyazaki, Hayao (2009) [1996]. Starting Point: 1979–1996. Viz Media. ISBN 978-1-4215-6104-2.
- Lerche, Anna; Mandal, Marcus (2003). A Royal Family – The Story of Christian IX and his European Descendants. Aschehoug. ISBN 87-15-10957-7.
- Pilipoveca, Tatjana (2017). "Interpreting "The Snow Queen": A comparison of two semantic universes". Σημειωτκή - Sign Systems Studies. 1–2. Estonia: University of Tartu: 181–193. doi:10.12697/SSS.2017.45.1-2.12.
