= Sokol (band) =

- Origin: Moscow, Soviet Union
- Genres: Blues rock, Rock and roll, Hard rock
- Years active: 1964–1969

Sokol (Falcon, Russian: Сокол) is the first Russian rock band, the “legend” of Russian rock.

== History ==
The band was formed at the end of 1964 in Moscow on the initiative of the guitarist Yuri Ermakov. The band also included Igor Goncharuk, Vyacheslav Chernysh, Sergey Timashev. The first administrator of the group was Yuri Aizenshpis. The name is associated with the Moscow region Sokol, where the band members lived.

Like all early Soviet bands, the Sokol's repertoire was based on the works of Western rock and pop stars: Elvis Presley, Bill Haley, the Beatles. However, Ermakov and Goncharuk became the authors of the first rock song written in Russian ("Где тот край", 1965). The first performance of the Sokol band took place on October 6, 1964 in Moscow in the Ekspromt cafe.

In 1968 Sokol recorded the song "Film, Film" for the animated film "Film, Film, Film", but the cartoon itself sounded the voices of singers from the Orpheus group. At the end of 1969, Sokol disbanded.

== Literature ==
- Alexander Alekseev. Who is Who in Russian Rock Music ISBN 978-5-17-048654-0
- Yevgeny Dodolev. Alexander Gradsky. The Voice ISBN 978-5-386-05582-0
