= Film, Film, Film =

1968 film

- Directed by: Fyodor Khitruk
- Written by: Vladimir Golovanov; Fyodor Khitruk
- Music by: Aleksandr Zatsepin; Yevgeny Krylatov
- Distributed by: Soyuzmultfilm
- Release date: January 1, 1968
- Running time: 20 minutes
- Country: USSR
- Language: Russian

Film, Film, Film (Russian: Фильм, фильм, фильм) is a 1968 Soviet satirical animated short film directed by Fyodor Khitruk.

Made as a parody of the Soviet movie industry, this nearly-silent pantomime tells a story of a film crew that faces various problems during the filmmaking process, from writing a screenplay, to pre-production (which includes dealing with bureaucratic officials), to the actual shooting of the movie.

== Plot ==
A screenwriter tries to write a script with a typewriter, but tears it up several times. In a fit of desperation, he prepares to commit suicide (implied by his cigarette smoke forming a noose), but a winged Muse descends to him. He frantically completes the script before passing out. His friend, a film director, walks in and, after reading the script, wakes him up, enthusiastically praises him and offers to pitch the script to multiple production companies.

The two pitch the script to the companies in a labyrinthine office building, where the script gets stamped with various criticisms. The two shorten the text, then add the text back, before the director finally manages to approve the script behind the door with the grandest design. The film director goes to the film studio and begins to gather the film crew: the art director, the cinematographer, the composer, the sound operator, the assistant director, the actors, workers, and others, while the screenwriter stays behind in the central city.

Filming begins on the film, a war epic. The director and crew encounter numerous difficulties: the necessary props are absent, the weather is bad, the child actor is uncooperative, and the production repeatedly runs over budget. To top it off, near the end of shooting, the authorities reject the end of the film, the protagonist's violent death, as too gloomy. The ending is urgently rewritten and reshot. At the premiere, after a tense wait where the director walks up the walls and screenwriter contemplates suicide again, the entire film crew, hearing applause from the audience, weeps with happiness.

The movie begins and ends with a song: "So many jobs that call, // but film is best of all. // Once you're involved with it // Happiness guaranteed".

== Creators ==
Role	Name
Director	Fyodor Khitruk
Screenwriters	Vladimir Golovanov, Fyodor Khitruk
Art Director	Vladimir Zuykov
Art Director's Assistant	Eduard Nazarov
Composers	Aleksandr Zatsepin, Yevgeny Krylatov
Cinematographer	Boris Kotov
Soundoperator	Georgy Martyniuk
Animators	Gennady Sokolsky, Violetta Kolesnikova, Igor Podgorskiy, Maria Motruk, Marina Voskanyants, Leonid Kayukov
Artists	V. Gilyarova, O. Vorobyova, Tatiana Kazantseva, Sophia Mitrofanova, Natalia Tanner, Alexei Solovyov, Tatiana Sokolskaya
Voice Actors	Aleksei Polevoy, Georgy Vitsin
Main music theme	Sokol (music); Vyacheslav Dobrynin, Valentin Vitebskiy and Leonid Berger (vocal)

== Awards ==
- 1969 — Honorary Diploma at the International Short Film Festival in Kraków
- 1970 — Prize at the International Short Film Festival in Tampere
- 1973 — Best Short Film prize at the International Film Festival of Colombo
- 1973 — Silver Medal at the International Animation Festival in New York City
- 1976 — Fyodor Khitruk received the USSR State Prize for Film, Film, Film, the Winnie-the-Pooh trilogy, Island and I Grant You A Star

== Other facts ==
- According to Khitruk, the cartoon character of the film director was inspired by Grigori Roshal and not by Sergei Eisenstein as most people think.
- The main theme was performed by Sokol, the first Soviet rock band, although they were listed as "VIA Sokol" in the credits. Vocals were provided by Vyacheslav Dobrynin, Valentin Vitebskiy and Leonid Berger of the VIA Orphey who were not mentioned in the credits at all.
