= The Story of a Crime =

- Film poster
- История одного преступления
- Directed by: Fyodor Khitruk
- Screenplay by: Michael Volpin
- Narrated by: Zinovy Gerdt
- Music by: Andrey Babaev
- Production company: Soyuzmultfilm
- Release date: 1962
- Running time: 19 min. 54 sec.
- Country: Soviet Union
- Language: Russian

The Story of a Crime (Russian: История одного преступления, translit. Istoriya odnogo prestupleniya) is a 1962 Soviet animated Short film directed by Fyodor Khitruk and based on a screenplay by Michael Volpin. It was produced by Soyuzmultfilm. The score is by Andrey Babaev, with sound editing by George Martynuk.

It was the first film by Khitruk, whose role in the history of Russian animation led him to be recognized as a People's Artist of the USSR and a Meritorious Artist, and to receive the Order of the Red Banner of Labour and the Order "For Merit to the Fatherland". The film is a hybrid of Traditional animation and Cutout animation

== Plot summary ==
Noises at night made by rude neighbors cause the very friendly and peaceful Vasily Mamin to commit a crime. The cartoon serves as an explanation as of why such a brutal crime is committed at the beginning. It is a flashback at how Mamin spent his last 24 hours before the crime. The character is having a drastic change in his life, but if we think about on our self, is it wrong?

== Voice cast ==
- Zinovy Gerdt as Narrator

== Awards ==
- 9th International Short Film Festival in Oberkhauzen (Federal Republic of Germany), 1963
- Diploma and The Golden Gates Prize of the 7th International Cinema Festival in San Francisco, 1962
