= Mikhail Volpin =

Russian satirist

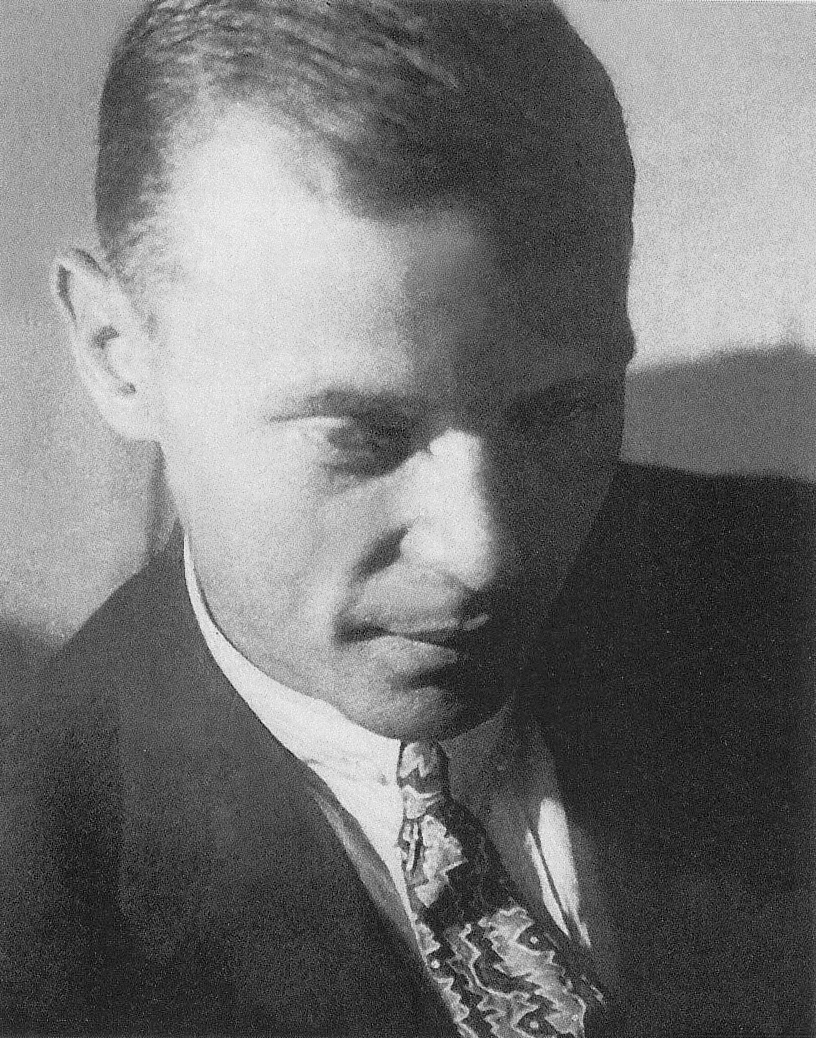
- Born: Mikhail Davydovich Volpin; 28 December 1902; Mogilev, Mogilev Governorate, Russian Empire
- Died: 21 July 1988 (aged 85); Moscow, Soviet Union
- Occupation: Screenwriter
- Years active: 1920–1986

Mikhail Davydovich Volpin (Russian: Михаи́л Давы́дович Во́льпин; 28 December 1902 – 21 July 1988) was a Soviet screenwriter. He is known for his professional partnership with Nikolai Erdman, with whom he was awarded the Stalin Prize in 1950.

== Early years ==
Volpin was born into an intellectual family: his father, David Samuilovich, was a lawyer; his mother, Anna Borisovna (née Zhislin) was a schoolteacher. He grew up in Moscow, where he was an artistic child. He took drawing lessons from Vasily Surikov. As a young man he was a supporter of the October Revolution and fought in the Russian Civil War for the Red Army.

From 1920 to 1921 he worked at the Russian Telegraph Agency as a writer and designer of satirical propaganda posters (so-called Rosta Windows), under the direction of Vladimir Mayakovsky.

From 1921 to 1927 he was a student at Vkhutemas, where he wrote satirical poems and comic plays, including collaborations with Viktor Ardov, Ilya Ilf, Yevgeny Petrov, Valentin Kataev, Vladimir Mass, and Nikolai Erdman.

In 1933, he was arrested by the OGPU, along with Erdman and Mass, and charged with writing "anti-Soviet fables". He spent the next four years in a prison camp in the arctic. After his release in 1937, he reunited with Erdman and they began a screenwriting partnership that would last until Erdman's death in 1970. Their professional collaboration was based on an enduring but asymmetrical friendship, in which Erdman always treated Volpin as an inferior. The two men shared an interest in horse racing and equestrianism, and several of their scripts involve horses and horsemanship as plot devices.

Before the war, Volpin married Irina Glebovna Barteneva (1918–2004), to whom he remained married until his death.

In 1941, at the outbreak of the Great Patriotic War, Volpin and Erdman were in Ryazan. Due to their history as political prisoners, they were unable to enlist in the ordinary way. Instead, they had to travel by foot to Tolyatti, a distance of over 600 kilometers, in order to enlist in a special unit for disenfranchised persons and former priests. During the trek, Volpin bartered for their food and lodgings by painting portraits of local peasants. Volpin and Erdman were only briefly exposed to the war. By January 1942, as a result of Erdman's connections to Lavrenty Beria, they obtained a transfer to Moscow, where they were assigned to write patriotic material for the Song and Dance Ensemble at the Central Club of the NKVD.

== Post-war career ==
From 1948 to 1971, Volpin produced scripts and lyrics to the animation studio Soyuzmultfilm, notably The Enchanted Boy, The Story of a Crime, It Was I Who Drew the Little Man, and The Key. The latter attracted the attention of Soviet censors, due to its negative portrayal of social conformity.

Volpin wrote eighteen feature-film screenplays, half of them in collaboration with Nikolai Erdman. In 1950, they were awarded the Stalin Prize for their work on Brave People, along with director Konstantin Yudin, cinematographer Igor Geleyn, and actors Sergei Gurzo and Aleksei Gribov. More familiar to contemporary audiences are Volpin's contributions to the fantasy genre: Jack Frost and Fire, Water, and Brass Pipes, both directed by Aleksandr Rou.

Volpin worked actively until shortly before his death in a traffic accident in 1988. He was buried in Vvedenskoye Cemetery in Moscow.

== Feature films (as screenwriter and lyricist) ==
- 1938 – Volga-Volga (Волга-Волга) – with Nikolai Erdman and Grigori Aleksandrov
- 1940 – Shining Path (Светлый путь) – lyricist, with Anatoly D'Aktil
- 1940 – The Old Horseman (Старый наездник)
- 1943 – The Actress (Актриса) – with Nikolai Erdman
- 1945 – Hello Moscow! (Здравствуй, Москва!) – with Nikolai Erdman
- 1949 – Cossacks of the Kuban (Кубанские казаки) – lyricist, with Mikhail Isakovsky
- 1950 – Brave People (Смелые люди) – with Nikolai Erdman (for which the duo won the Stalin Prize)
- 1951 – Lofty Hill (Высокая горка)
- 1951 – Sporting Honour (Спортивная честь) – with Nikolai Erdman
- 1953 – Mountain Outpost (Застава в горах) – with Nikolai Erdman
- 1956 – On the Stage (На подмостках сцены)
- 1957 – Gutta-percha Boy (Гуттаперчевый мальчик)
- 1957 – Tales of Lenin (Рассказы о Ленине) – with Nikolai Erdman and Yevgeny Gabrilovich
- 1964 – Jack Frost (Морозко) – with Nikolai Erdman
- 1967 – Fire, Water, and Brass Pipes (Огонь, вода и… медные трубы) – with Nikolai Erdman
- 1974 – Prince Prosha (Царевич Проша)
- 1976 – How Ivanushka the Fool Travelled in Search of Wonder (Как Иванушка-дурачок за чудом ходил)
- 1979 – Nightingale (Соловей) – adapted from the story by Hans Christian Andersen
- 1982 – Donkeyskin (Ослиная шкура) – adapted from the story by Charles Perrault
- 1986 – The Tale of the Painter's Lover (Сказка про влюблённого маляра) – with Valeri Frid
