= A Noisy Day =

- Russian: Шумный день
- Directed by: Anatoly Efros; Georgy Natanson
- Written by: Viktor Rozov
- Starring: Valentina Sperantova; Gennadi Pechnikov; Tatyana Nadezhdina; Vladimir Zemlyanikin; Oleg Tabakov
- Cinematography: Viktor Dombrovsky
- Music by: Antonio Spadavekkia
- Production company: Mosfilm
- Release date: 1960
- Running time: 95 min.
- Country: Soviet Union
- Language: Russian

A Noisy Day (Russian: Шумный день, romanized: Shumniy den) is a 1960 Soviet teen comedy film directed by Anatoly Efros and Georgy Natanson, based on Viktor Rozov's comedy "In Search of Joy".

The film tells about a close-knit Soviet family, in whose house everything is wonderful, until a conflict of two different worldviews occurs.

== Plot ==
The story follows a single day in the life of the Savin family, who live in a small Moscow apartment. The matriarch, Klavdiya Vasilyevna, resides with her four children: Fyodor, a chemist and newlywed; Tatyana, a 19-year-old university student; Nikolay, an 18-year-old repair worker; and Oleg, the youngest at 15. Fyodor’s wife, Lena, is preoccupied with furnishing the apartment, treating the new furniture with obsessive care and speaking only of money and possessions. The family’s routine is disrupted when their neighbors, Ivan Nikitich Lapshin and his son Gena, visit. Gena is shy and embarrassed by his father’s borrowing habits but harbors feelings for Tatyana. The tense family dynamics unravel further when Oleg accidentally spills ink on a new desk, leading to a dramatic confrontation. Lena’s obsession with the ruined furniture escalates into a fit of anger, during which she throws the family aquarium out of the window, pushing Oleg to the breaking point.

As the day progresses, tensions rise among the family members. Lena persuades Tatyana to consider marrying Fyodor’s colleague, Leonid, while Oleg finds solace in Gena’s support. However, Gena’s attempt to replace the broken aquarium is tainted when it is revealed he used stolen money to buy it. Meanwhile, Lena plans to move in with Leonid temporarily, causing further discord. The family’s conflict culminates in a heated dinner conversation, where Klavdiya accuses Lena of sacrificing human values for materialism. The day ends with a mix of resolutions and regrets: Gena reconciles with his father after publicly admitting his theft, and Oleg rejects the stolen aquarium, symbolizing his resistance to the surrounding materialism. As Fyodor departs with Lena and Leonid, he entrusts his unfinished manuscript to his mother, leaving behind a fractured but still enduring family.

== Cast ==
- Valentina Sperantova as Klavdiya Vasilevna Savina
- Gennadi Pechnikov as Fedor
- Tatyana Nadezhdina as Tatyana
- Vladimir Zemlyanikin as Nikolay
- Oleg Tabakov as Oleg
- Liliya Tolmacheva as Lenochka
- Yevgeny Perov as Lapshin
- Lev Kruglyy as Gennadi
- Viktoriya Dukhina as Marina
- Robert Chumak as Leonid Pavlovich
- Inna Gulaya as Fira
