= Valentina Sperantova =

Russian actress (1904–1978)

- Born: Valentina Aleksandrovna Sperantova; 24 February 1904; Zaraysk, Ryazan Governorate, Russian Empire
- Died: 7 January 1978 (aged 73); Moscow, Soviet Union
- Education: Russian Academy of Theatre Arts
- Occupations: Actress, voice actress
- Years active: 1925–1977

Valentina Aleksandrovna Sperantova (Russian: Валенти́на Алекса́ндровна Спера́нтова; 24 February 1904 — 7 January 1978) was a Soviet and Russian stage and film actress. She was awarded the title of People's Artist of the USSR in 1970.

== Biography ==
Sperantova was born in Zaraysk. She had a large family headed by her father Aleksandr Dmitriyevich Sperantov, secretary of the district congress. She first went on stage in her hometown of Zaraysk in an amateur theatre under the guidance of the famous sculptor Anna Golubkina.

She received her education in Vkhutemas, but did not study there for long. In 1925 she graduated from GITIS. Since 1925, she was the actress of the First State Pedagogical Theater (now Moscow Youth Theater).

She took part in the scoring of cartoons at the Soyuzmultfilm Studio. In the cinema, since 1953, she had played 25 roles.

== Filmography ==
=== Live action ===
- Alyosha Ptitsyn Grows Up (1953) – Grandma Sima, Olga Aleksandrovna's friend
- A Noisy Day (1960) – Klavdiya Vasilyevna Savina
- Two Tickets for a Daytime Picture Show (1966) – Yevdokiya Fyodorovna Lebedyanskaya, Lebedyansky's mother
- Funny Magic (1969) – Akulina Ivanovna / Baba Yaga
- Big School-Break (1972) – Auntie Glasha, janitor

=== Voice acting ===
- The Little Humpbacked Horse (1947) – Ivan
- The Golden Antelope (1954) – The Boy
- The Enchanted Boy (1955) – Nils Holgersson
- It Was I Who Drew the Little Man (1960) – Fedya Zaitsev
- Most, Most, Most, Most (1966) – Adolescent Lion

== Awards and honours ==
- Honored Artist of the RSFSR (1946)
- People's Artist of the RSFSR (1950)
- People's Artist of the USSR (20 October 1970)
- Medal "For Valiant Labour in the Great Patriotic War 1941–1945"
- Medal "In Commemoration of the 800th Anniversary of Moscow"
- Order of the Badge of Honour
- Order of the Red Banner of Labour
