= Nikolai Prilutskiy =

Soviet and Russian sound operator

Nikolai Prilutskiy Николай Прилуцкий
- Born: Nikolai Stepanovich Prilutskiy; January 26, 1909; Moscow, Russian Empire
- Died: July 25, 1990 (aged 81); Moscow, Soviet Union
- Occupation: Director of audiography
- Years active: 1934 - 1974

Nikolai Stepanovich Prilutskiy (Russian: Николай Степанович Прилуцкий (January 26, 1909, Moscow – July 25, 1990, Moscow) was a Soviet and Russian sound operator, one of the first operators who created the sound for Soviet cartoons at the beginning of the Soviet animation.

== Biography ==
Prilutskiy was one of the foremost Soviet directors of audiography and one of the founders of Soviet animation art. He was the director of audiography at the famous classics of Soviet animation, such as the prize-winning fairy tales The Snow Maiden, The Enchanted Boy, The Twelve Months and the full-length animation The Snow Queen (1957), and the modern satirical tale The Key (1961). Also Nikolai Prilutskiy made the sound for more than one hundred Russian cartoons.

== Selected filmography ==
- 1945 - The Lost Letter (Пропавшая грамота)
- 1952 - The Snow Maiden (Снегурочка)
- 1955 - The Enchanted Boy (Заколдованный мальчик)
- 1956 - The Twelve Months (Двенадцать месяцев)
- 1957 - The Snow Queen (Снежная королева)
- 1960 - It Was I Who Drew the Little Man (Человечка нарисовал я)
- 1961 - The Key (Ключ)
