= Snowman Postman =

1955 Soviet animated children's cartoon

- Снеговик-почтовик romanized: Snegovik-pochtovik
- Genre: Fairy tale
- Based on: Vladimir Suteev
- Directed by: Leonid Amalrik
- Voices of: Larisa Bukhartseva; Maria Vinogradova; Georgy Vitsin; Alexey Gribov; Rostislav Plyatt; Yuri Khrzhanovsky; Alexander Shchagin; Yulia Yulskaya
- Composer: Nikita Bogoslovsky
- Country of origin: Soviet Union
- Original language: Russian

Production
- Production location: Moscow
- Animator: Vladimir Arbekov
- Running time: 17 minutes 45 seconds
- Production company: Soyuzmultfilm

Original release
- Release: 1955

External videos
- The cartoon

Snowman-Postman (Russian: Снеговик-почтовик, romanized: Snegovik-pochtovik) is a 1955 Soviet animated children's Novy God cartoon, based on the fairy tale "Yolka" by Vladimir Suteev. The plot is about a snowman (Snegovik) who has to bring the children's wish lists to Ded Moroz, the Russian equivalent of Santa Claus.

== Plot ==
On New Year's Eve, several children write a letter to Ded Moroz, asking him to send them a New Year's tree (Ёлка, Yolka) for New Year's, and then proceed to build a snowman, dance around him and sing about how they want their wishes to be fulfilled. When midnight strikes, the snowman comes to life as the clock on Spasskaya Tower strikes and, together with a small puppy named Druzhok (Дружок), sets off to find Ded Moroz.

After entering the "magic forest", they get lost and ask an owl, who found them, how to get to Ded Moroz, but get any answer. Afterwards, a fox appears trying to steal the letter from Snegovik. After a long back and forth, they get into a fight, with the fox trying to steal the letter, but being stopped by a wolf, who later attacks it. Druzhok, taking advantage of the fight, grabs the letter and returns it to Snegovik, causing the villains to chase them. However, they retreat when waking up a bear at their spot of fighting.

The Bear, having listened to Snegovik and Druzhok, gets them to Ded Moroz, but Snegovik, having rolled down a mountain, crashes into a stump and falls apart. Somehow, Druzhok and the bear manage to restore him, but the fox uses the situations and again grabs the letter and runs away with the others.

The fox, wolf and owl manage to run to Ded Moroz's residence before the other three and begin to ask him for everything they want. But Ded Moroz reads out the letter and asks which of them is Snegovik. The villains are surprised, but soon Snegovik, Druzhok and the bear appear. They admit that the children gave the letter to Snegovik for it to reach Ded Moroz, but the villains stole the letter. Ded Moroz, realizing what happened, blows the three villains away with a blizzard and gives Snegovik a Yolka and a bag of treats, ordering him to take it all to the children and tell them: "Ded Moroz congratulates everyone on the New Year!" ("Поздравляет всех Дед Мороз с Новым годом!", "Pozdravlyayet vsyekh Ded Moroz s Novym godom!")

By dawn, Snegovik and Druzhok take the tree and bag of treats back to Moscow on a sled. When the kids go outside on the morning of New Year's Eve, they are met by a decorated New Year's tree and Snegovik next to it.

At the end, at night, children dance on skates around the tree and celebrate the New Year.

== Awards ==
- In 1956, at the 10th Edinburgh International Film Festival, the cartoon was awarded a diploma.

== Other facts ==
- Since then, Snegovik has become a companion of Ded Moroz, sometimes being depicted next to him and his granddaughter Snegurochka, the main two faces of New Year's in Russia
- Snegovik was again depicted in another Soviet animated children's Novy God cartoon, called Ded Moroz and the grey wolf (Russian: Дед Мороз и серый волк, romanized: Ded Moroz i seryy volk) from 1978, as a driver of Ded Moroz
