= The Snow Maiden (1952 film) =

1952 animated film directed by Ivan Ivanov-Vano

- Directed by: Ivan Ivanov-Vano; Aleksandra Snezhko-Blotskaya
- Written by: Oleg Leonidov; Aleksandra Snezhko-Blotskaya; Ivan Ivanov-Vano; Aleksandr Ostrovsky (play)
- Starring: V. Shvetsov; L. Ktitorov; V. Borisenko; Irina Maslennikova
- Edited by: Nina Mayorova
- Music by: Nikolai Rimsky-Korsakov
- Release date: February 2, 1952
- Running time: 70 minutes
- Country: Soviet Union
- Language: Russian

The Snow Maiden (Russian: Снегу́рочка; tr.:Snegurochka) is a 1952 Soviet/Russian traditionally animated feature film. It was produced at the Soyuzmultfilm studio in Moscow and is based on the 1873 Slavic-pagan play of the same name by Aleksandr Ostrovsky (itself largely based on traditional folk tales). Music from Nikolai Rimsky-Korsakov's 1882 opera The Snow Maiden is used, arranged for the film by L. Shvarts. The animated film was shown at movie theaters.

The film is listed as being in the public domain on the website of the Russian Federal Agency of Culture and Cinematography. The film also lapsed into the public domain in the United States when its US copyright expired, but the copyright was restored under the GATT treaty.

Snegurochka (the Snow Maiden), the daughter of Spring the Beauty (Весна-Красна) and Ded Moroz, yearns for the companionship of mortal humans. She grows to like the Slavic god-shepherd named Lel, but her heart is unable to know love. Her mother takes pity and gives her this ability, but as soon as she falls in love, her heart warms up and she melts.

== Plot ==
The winter is coming to an end, and the Leshy, a forest spirit, sees a flock of birds in the sky. He dives into a hollow to sleep for a while. Spring arrives, and the birds begin to dance. However, this moment is interrupted by Ded Moroz (Father Frost), who tells Spring that he must head north. But the question arises of what to do with his daughter, Snegurochka (the Snow Maiden). Her heart is made of ice and has never known the simple joys of life or love. Yet, one day, after hearing the songs of the shepherd Lel, she desires to stay in the kingdom of Berendei. Ded Moroz is displeased by this and orders the Leshy, who has just awoken briefly, to watch over Snegurochka. Soon after, the parents of Snegurochka disappear. Meanwhile, the people of Berendei celebrate the end of the Maslenitsa holiday, and the Ice Maiden meets a man named Bobyl and his wife, bidding farewell to the forest and its inhabitants.

Time passes, and Mizgir, the fiancé of Snegurochka's best friend Kupava, falls in love with the maiden, who is living with Bobyl at the time. Lel, initially entertaining Snegurochka with his songs and flute playing, eventually leaves for the other girls, which upsets Snegurochka, the daughter of Moroz and Spring. Heartbroken by Mizgir's love for Snegurochka, Kupava plans to drown herself in the river, but Lel stops her. In his palace, the old Tsar Berendey discusses with his boyar Berymya the troubled situation in his kingdom caused by the anger of the Sun god Yarilo. Kupava reveals her heartache to the Tsar. During a public court, the Tsar learns of Mizgir's love for Snegurochka and decides to banish him. Accompanied by her adoptive parents, Snegurochka visits the Tsar's palace and surprises him with her lack of knowledge about love. The Tsar then declares that whoever awakens love in Snegurochka will be the first guest at the upcoming forest celebration. The people celebrate, with Bobyl taking an active role, much to the dismay of the Leshy.

Lel must choose which of the girls he wants to marry, and it is then that he realizes he does not love Snegurochka, but has fallen for her friend Kupava. Kupava is happy about this, and the two share a kiss. Snegurochka, unable to bear seeing the shepherd kiss another girl, runs off into the forest. Mizgir chases after her but encounters the Leshy. In the forest, Snegurochka, while meeting Spring, receives the gift of love, which delights Mizgir. However, she soon melts under the warmth of the sun's rays. In despair, Mizgir throws himself off a cliff by the riverbank. The festival continues, and during the celebration, the Tsar announces that Yarilo, having seen the death of Snegurochka, has transformed his anger into mercy. Lel and Kupava are together forever, though they mourn Snegurochka's loss. They find comfort only in the fact that they are alive and love each other.

In the epilogue, the people sing a song of thanks to Yarilo for his mercy.

The Snow Maiden (1952)

== Creators ==
	Romanized	Russian
Director-producer	Ivan Ivanov-Vano	Иван Иванов-Вано
Director	Aleksandra Snezhko-Blotskaya	Александра Снежко-Блоцкая
Scenario	Oleg Leonidov; Aleksandra Snezhko-Blotskaya; Ivan Ivanov-Vano	Олег Леонидов; Александра Снежко-Блоцкая; Иван Иванов-Вано
Art Director	Nadezhda Stroganova	Надежда Строганова
Artists	Y. Tannenberg; Irina Svetlitsa; V. Valerianova; I. Troyanova; Viktor Nikitin; G. Nevzorova; N. Fyodorova; O. Gemmerling; Lev Milchin	Е. Танненберг; Ирина Светлица; В. Валерианова; И. Троянова; Виктор Никитин; Г. Невзорова; Н. Фёдорова; О. Геммерлинг; Лев Мильчин
Animators	Vladimir Danilevich; K. Malyshev; Grigoriy Kozlov; Faina Yepifanova; Nadezhda Privalova; Boris Butakov; B. Savkov; Roman Kachanov; Valentin Lalayants; Yelizaveta Komova; Roman Davydov; Tatyana Fyodorova; Konstantin Chikin; Mikhail Botov; Vadim Dolgikh; Vladimir Arbekov; Vyacheslav Kotyonochkin; Lidiya Reztsova; K. Nikiforov	Владимир Данилевич; К. Малышев; Григорий Козлов; Фаина Епифанова; Надежда Привалова; Борис Бутаков; Б. Савков; Роман Качанов; Валентин Лалаянц; Елизавета Комова; Роман Давыдов; Татьяна Фёдорова; Константин Чикин; Михаил Ботов; Вадим Долгих; Владимир Арбеков; Вячеслав Котёночкин; Лидия Резцова; К. Никифоров
Camera Operators	Nikolai Voinov; Yelena Petrova	Николай Воинов; Елена Петрова
Sound Operator	Nikolai Prilutskiy	Николай Прилуцкий
Editor	Nina Mayorova	Нина Майорова
Vocals	V. Shvetsov (as Bobyl Bakula); L. Ktitorov (as Grandfather Frost); V. Borisenko (as Lel); Irina Maslennikova (as Snow Maiden)	В. Шевцов; Л. Ктиторов; В. Борисенко; Ирина Масленникова

== Creation history ==
In the first half of the 1950s the Soyuzmultfilm studio releases known movies of the "classical" direction — mainly children's, often based on application of "eclair" (rotoscoping). During this period such well-known tapes as "The Tale of the Fisherman and a Small Fish" (1950), "Kashtanka" (1952) M. M. Tsekhanovsky, and "The Snow Maiden" (1952) I. P. Ivanov-Vano, etc. are removed. In the movie "Snow Maiden" the innovative artistic touch offered by V. A. Nikitin — use of luminescent paints was used.

== The edition on video ==
In the early 1980s the animated film started being issued by the Videoprogramma Goskino of the USSR video company initially on import, since 1984 on the Soviet cartridges "VK Electronics". Since 1990 the animated film is released by the film association "Krupnyy Plan" on videotapes. In the mid-nineties Studio PRO Video published the animated film on VHS in the collection of the best Soviet animated films Frost Ivanovich, Wonderful Hand Bell, Sister Alyonushka and Brother Ivanushka, Vasilisa Mikulishna, Lie's Swans and The Tale of the Fisherman and Small Fish. Since 1995, the Union of Video studio republished this animated film on VHS.

From the first half the 2000s, the animated film was restored and released on DVD by Soyuz Video studio.

== See also ==
- History of Russian animation
- List of animated feature films
