= Alexandra Snezhko-Blotskaya =

Soviet animated film director

Alexandra Gavrilovna Snezhko-Blotskaya (Russian: Александра Гавриловна Снежко-Блоцкая, 21 February 1909 – 29 December 1980) was a Soviet animated film director. She was a longtime collaborator with Ivan Ivanov-Vano.

== Biography ==
Snezhko-Blotskaya was born in Volchansk near Kharkov (modern Ukraine), before her family moved to Shatura, near Moscow. There she graduated from art studios of Ivan Rerberg and Ilya Mashkov.

Snezhko-Blotskaya started her film career as designer for Soyuzkinokhronika in 1932. Since 1936, she became a constant collaborator and aide to Ivan Ivanov-Vano, a patriarch of Russian animation. Snezhko-Blotskaya participated as a co-director in many of his films including famous The Humpbacked Horse and The Snow Maiden. Her first solo feature-length film was The Enchanted Boy (1955), based on The Wonderful Adventures of Nils by Selma Lagerlöf.

Most of Snezhko-Blotskaya's films were fantasy based on folk tales and books by authors like Alexander Pushkin and Rudyard Kipling. In the 1970s she directed a series of five animated shorts based on Greek mythology.

Snezhko-Blotskaya died in 1980 at the age of 71 at her home in Zheleznodorozhny, Moscow Oblast.

== Filmography ==
=== Second unit director for Ivanov-Vano ===
- 1949 — Geese-Swans (Гуси-лебеди) - based on Russian folklore.
- 1951 — The Tale of the Dead Tsarevna and Seven Bogatyrs (Сказка о мёртвой царевне и о семи богатырях) - based on a poem by Alexander Pushkin.
- 1952 — Snegurochka (Снегурочка) based on a play by Alexander Ostrovsky.

=== Solo director ===
- 1954 — Orange Throat (Оранжевое горлышко) - based on a story by Vitaly Bianki.
- 1955 — The Enchanted Boy (Заколдованный мальчик) - based on a novel by Selma Lagerlöf.
- 1957 — Verlioka (Верлиока) - based on east Slavic folklore.
- 1958 — The Tale of Malchish-Kibalchish (Сказка о Мальчише-Кибальчише) - based on a story by Arkady Gaidar.
- 1959 — The Amber Castle (Янтарный замок) - based on Lithuanian folklore.
- 1961 — The Dragon (Дракон) - based on Vietnamese folklore.
- 1962 — The Wonderful Garden (Чудесный сад) - based on Kazakh folklore.
- 1963 — Barankin, Be a Human! (Баранкин, будь человеком!) - based on a story by Valery Medvedev.
- 1963 — Sun's Daughter (Дочь солнца)
- 1965 — Rikki-Tikki-Tavi (Рикки-тикки-тави) - based on a story by Rudyard Kipling
- 1967 — The Tale of the Golden Cockerel (Сказка о золотом петушке) - based on a poem by Alexander Pushkin.
- 1968 — The Cat Who Walked By Himself (Кот, который гулял сам по себе) - based on a story by Rudyard Kipling
- Films based on Greek mythology:
  - 1969 — The Return from Olympus (Возвращение с Олимпа)
  - 1971 — The Labyrinth (Лабиринт)
  - 1971 — Argonauths (Аргонавты)
  - 1973 — Perseus (Персей)
  - 1974 — Prometheus (Прометей)

== See also ==
- Brumberg sisters
