= Nikolay Fyodorov (film director) =

Soviet-Russian animator

Nikolay Petrovich Fyodorov (Russian: Никола́й Петро́вич Фёдоров; 7 April 1914 – 11 May 1994) was a Soviet-Russian animator, director, writer and cartoonist working for Soyuzmultfilm from the 1930s to the 1980s and director of a number of films in the 1950s and 1960s. He was co-director of the famous 1957 animated feature The Snow Queen.

== See also ==
- History of Russian animation
