= The Enchanted Boy =

The Enchanted Boy Заколдованный мальчик
- Nils on Martin's back during their adventure across Lapland
- Directed by: Vladimir Polkovnikov; Alexandra Snezhko-Blotskaya
- Written by: Selma Lagerlöf (story); Mikhail Volpin
- Starring: Valentina Sperantova; Alexey Konsovskiy; Tatyana Strukova; Anatoly Kubatsky; Erast Garin; Georgy Vitsin; Georgiy Millyar
- Edited by: Nina Mayorova
- Music by: Vladimir Yurovskiy
- Production company: Soyuzmultfilm (Soviet Union)
- Release date: September 16, 1955 (Soviet Union)
- Running time: 46 minutes
- Country: Soviet Union
- Language: Russian

The Enchanted Boy (Russian: Заколдованный мальчик, Zakoldovanyy malchik) is a 1955 Soviet/Russia traditionally animated feature film directed by Vladimir Polkovnikov and Alexandra Snezhko-Blotskaya. The film is an adaptation of The Wonderful Adventures of Nils by Selma Lagerlöf and was produced at the Soyuzmultfilm studio in Moscow.

In 2007 the film's image and sound were restored by the Russian company Krupnyy Plan, who released it on video and DVD packaged together with Cipollino, a 1961, 40-minute feature film directed by Boris Dyozhkin. No English-subtitled version has been released.

== Plot ==
The naughty boy Nils, who delights in torturing animals, is bewitched by a tomte. Now shrunken to a small size and able to talk to animals, he flies across Lapland on the backs of wild geese. During these dangerous travels he does many noble deeds, and, at the same time, searches for the tomte who would take the spell away.

== Creators ==
	English	Russian
Director-producers	Vladimir Polkovnikov; Alexandra Snezhko-Blotskaya	Владимир Полковников; Александра Снежко-Блоцкая
Scenario	Mikhail Volpin	Михаил Вольпин
Art directors	Grazhina Brashishkitye; Lev Milchin; Roman Kachanov	Гражина Брашишките; Лев Мильчин; Роман Качанов
Artists	Irina Svetlitsa; I. Prokofyeva; Pyotr Korobayev	Ирина Светлица; И. Прокофьева; Пётр Коробаев
Animators	Konstantin Chikin; Tatyana Taranovich; Faina Yepifanova; L. Popov; Vadim Dolgikh; Boris Meyerovich; Lev Pozdneyev; Renata Mirenkova; Igor Podgorskiy; Fyodor Khitruk; Vladimir Krumin; Gennadiy Novozhilov; Boris Chani	Константин Чикин; Татьяна Таранович; Фаина Епифанова; Л. Попов; Вадим Долгих; Борис Меерович; Лев Позднеев; Рената Миренкова; Игорь Подгорский; Фёдор Хитрук; Владимир Крумин; Геннадий Новожилов; Борис Чани
Camera operator	Mikhail Druyan	Михаил Друян
Composer	Vladimir Yurovskiy	Владимир Юровский
Sound operator	Nikolai Prilutskiy	Николай Прилуцкий
Voice actors	Valentina Sperantova (Nils); Alexey Konsovskiy; Tatyana Strukova; Anatoly Kubatsky (Gnome); Erast Garin (Martin); Georgy Vitsin (Rozenbaum); Georgiy Millyar	Валентина Сперантова; Алексей Консовский; Татьяна Струкова; Анатолий Кубацкий; Эраст Гарин; Георгий Вицин; Георгий Милляр
Editor	Nina Mayorova	Нина Майорова

== Video ==
In the early nineties the animated film was released on videotapes by the film association Krupnyy Plan. In the middle of the 1990s, it was included in the collection "The Best Soviet Animated Films" by Studio PRO Video and in the collection of animated films of a film studio Soyuzmultfilm.

== See also ==
- History of Russian animation
- List of animated feature-length films
