= Nikolai Erdman =

Soviet dramatist and screenwriter (1900–1970)

- Николай Робертович Эрдман
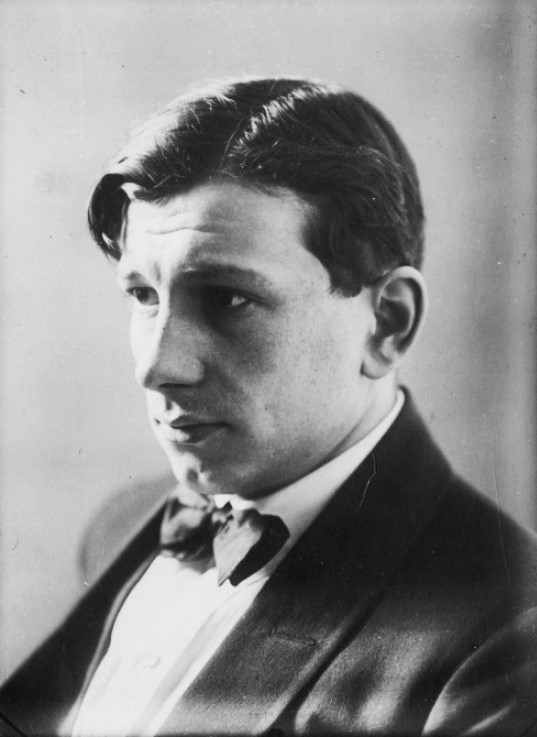
- Born: 16 November [O.S. 3 November] 1900; Moscow, Russian Empire
- Died: 10 August 1970; Moscow, RSFSR, Soviet Union
- Occupations: Playwright, screenwriter, poet
- Writing career
- Notable works: The Mandate; The Suicide
- Notable awards: Stalin Prize (1951)

Nikolai Robertovich Erdman (Russian: Николай Робертович Эрдман, IPA: [nʲɪkɐˈlaj ˈrobʲɪrtəvʲɪtɕ ˈɛrdmən]; 16 November [O.S. 3 November] 1900, Moscow – 10 August 1970) was a Soviet dramatist and screenwriter primarily remembered for his work with Vsevolod Meyerhold in the 1920s. His plays, notably The Suicide (1928), form a link in Russian literary history between the satirical drama of Nikolai Gogol and the post-World War II Theatre of the Absurd.

== Early life ==
Born to parents of Baltic German descent, Erdman was reared in Moscow. His brother Boris Erdman (1899–1960) was a stage designer who introduced him to the literary and theatrical milieu of Moscow. Young Erdman was particularly impressed by the grotesquely satirical poetry of Vladimir Mayakovsky, which seemed to defy all poetical conventions. At the outbreak of the Russian Civil War, he volunteered with the Red Army.

Erdman's first short poem was published in 1919. His longest and most original poetical work was Self-Portrait (1922). As a poet, Erdman aligned himself with the Imaginists, a bohemian movement led by Sergei Yesenin. In 1924, Erdman acted as a "witness for the defense" in the mock Imaginist Process. He also authored a number of witty parodies which were staged in the theatres of Moscow.

== Work with Meyerhold ==
In 1924, Erdman wrote his first major play, The Mandate (in English aka The Warrant), for Vsevolod Meyerhold. The young playwright cleverly exploited the subject of the subverted wedding to produce a work brimming with tragic absurdity. In his adaptation of the play, Meyerhold chose to emphasize the mannequin-like behavior of Erdman's characters by introducing the tragic finale which revealed "the total and disastrous loss of identity" on the part of his characters.

Meyerhold, Mayakovsky, and Erdman.

Erdman's next collaboration with Meyerhold was The Suicide (1928), "a spectacular mixture of the ridiculous and the sublime", universally recognized as one of the finest plays written during the Soviet period. The play draws on the theme of the faked suicide, which had been introduced into Russian literature by Alexander Sukhovo-Kobylin in The Death of Tarelkin (1869) and was explored by Leo Tolstoy in The Living Corpse (1900).

Erdman's masterpiece had a tortuous production history. Meyerhold's attempts to stage the play were thwarted by Soviet authorities. The Vakhtangov Theatre also failed to overcome censorship difficulties. At last Konstantin Stanislavsky sent a letter to Joseph Stalin, in which he compared Erdman to Gogol and cited Maxim Gorky's enthusiasm for the play. The permission to stage the play was granted, and the Moscow Art Theatre did rehearse it for several months, but they abandoned it in May 1932 at the very time when the Meyerhold Theatre decided to lean on the permission given to Stanislavsky to mount their own production. Meyerhold, too, however, suspended his rehearsals on August 15, 1932. A last-ditch effort to revive the production took place in mid-October when Lazar Kaganovich, at that time a 2nd Secretary of the Communist Party of the Soviet Union, was invited by Meyerhold's team to see a partial dress rehearsal. Kaganovich did not like what he saw and The Suicide was placed under a final ban that would last almost 60 years in Russia. Writes Erdman biographer John Freedman, "The black mark of Stalin's right-hand men on The Suicide carried with it a solemn finality. The Leader had given his sanction to one try, there would not be another."

== Years of Repression ==
His career in the theatre effectively stalled, Erdman turned his attention to the cinema. Even before the writing of The Suicide, he had created scripts for several silent films, the most famous being Boris Barnet's The House on Trubnaya. The legend of Erdman's arrest comfortably states that his fate was sealed when Stanislavsky's actor Vasily Kachalov thoughtlessly recited Erdman's satirical fables to Stalin during a night party in the Kremlin. In fact, as shown by Erdman's biographer John Freedman, it was surely a combination of many things - including the scandal around The Suicide, a bitterly satirical short play titled A Meeting About Laughter that was pulled from publication shortly before going to press, bitter public attacks on Erdman in the press by many, including the prominent regime-friendly playwright Vsevolod Vyshnevsky, and the extremely popular satirical fables co-authored by Erdman and his friend Vladimir Mass, which were recited orally all over Moscow. Erdman was arrested 10 October 1933, as was Mass. The arrest took place in front of the entire film crew on the set of the filming of the first Soviet attempt to create a musical, Jolly Fellows (director Grigory Aleksandrov). He was held for several days in the bowels of the KGB headquarters at Lubyanka, then was hurriedly deported to the town of Yeniseysk in Siberia. The following year he was permitted to move to Tomsk, where, thanks to the patronage of the prominent local actress Lina Samborskaya, he was able to secure a job as the literary director at the Tomsk Drama Theatre. His only major work there would appear to have been a dramatization of Maxim Gorky's novel Mother in 1935.

Although he was not allowed to appear in Moscow, Erdman would visit the city illegally in the 1930s. During one of such visits, he read to Mikhail Bulgakov the first act of his new play The Hypnotist (never completed). Bulgakov was so impressed by his talent that he petitioned Stalin to sanction Erdman's return to the capital. The petition was ignored, but Erdman was allowed to write the script for another Grigory Alexandrov comedy Volga-Volga (1938).

At the outbreak of World War II, Erdman was in Ryazan with his friend and collaborator Mikhail Volpin, whom he had known since his time with Mayakovsky. As both men had a history as political prisoners, they were unable to enlist in the army in the ordinary fashion. Instead, they had to travel by foot to Tolyatti, a distance of 600 kilometers, in order to enlist in a special unit open to disenfranchised persons and former priests. In 1942, through Lavrentiy Beria's patronage, Erdman obtained a transfer to Moscow for himself and Volpin, and they spent the remainder of the war writing material for the Song and Dance Ensemble at the Central Club of the NKVD.

== The Post-War and Thaw Eras ==
After the war Erdman remained shut out of theatrical circles, but continued to work actively in film and animation. He received the Stalin Prize (2nd degree) for his script to the film Courageous People (1951). Many of the animated films for which he created scripts, were - and remain today - extremely popular. They include Fedya Zaitsev (1948), The Lu Brothers (1953), Orange Throat (1954), The Island of Errors (1955), I Drew the Little Man (1960), The Traveling Frog (1965), The Cat that Walked by Itself (1968), and many more. His scripts to so-called children's fairy-tales such as Cain XVIII (1963) and City of Artisans (1966) were surprisingly barbed political satires.

Erdman's perfection of dialogues and compositions was crucial in adapting Hans Christian Andersen's fairy tale to the Soviet film screens. The film The Snow Queen was cowritten by director Lev Atamanov and Georgy Grebner(ru). Of all the people in the world influenced by the movie, it would be the Japanese people that would greatly adore the film. Akagi Kanzaki, children's literature critic of Japan stated the film adaptation is clear and coherent in context to Andersen's story: "Therefore, the story is much more consistent and clearer than the Andersen version." It would be the acclaimed director, animator Hayao Miyazaki himself who would undoubtedly be influenced by the film and to a general extent Erdman's script. Miyazaki especially was influenced by the episode when Gerda sacrifices her shoes to the river. The subtleties of the script and animation was crucial in keeping high the spirit of the animator needed for his productions in the late 1900s.

In 1964, Erdman's old friend Yuri Lyubimov from the NKVD Song and Dance Ensemble invited him to collaborate with the newly founded Taganka Theatre. Although Lyubimov and Erdman worked on several projects aspiring to revive Meyerhold's traditions, including an aborted attempt to stage The Suicide around 1968, it was not until 1990 that Lyubimov succeeded in producing his own stage version of the long-suffering play.

Erdman's principal work was banned in the Soviet Union until the Perestroika era. Even the comparatively orthodox Moscow Satire Theatre (inaugurated in 1924 with the production of Erdman's review Moscow from the Point of View...) failed to have their version of The Suicide approved by the Soviet censors.

== Works ==
- N. Erdman. Пьесы. Интермедии. Письма. Документы. Воспоминания современников. Moscow, 1990.
- N. Erdman / A. Stepanova, un amour en exil, correspondence 1933–35, adaptation de Lara Suyeux, traduction française Evy Vartazarmian. Triartis Editions, Paris, 2011.
