= Nikolai Gogol bibliography =

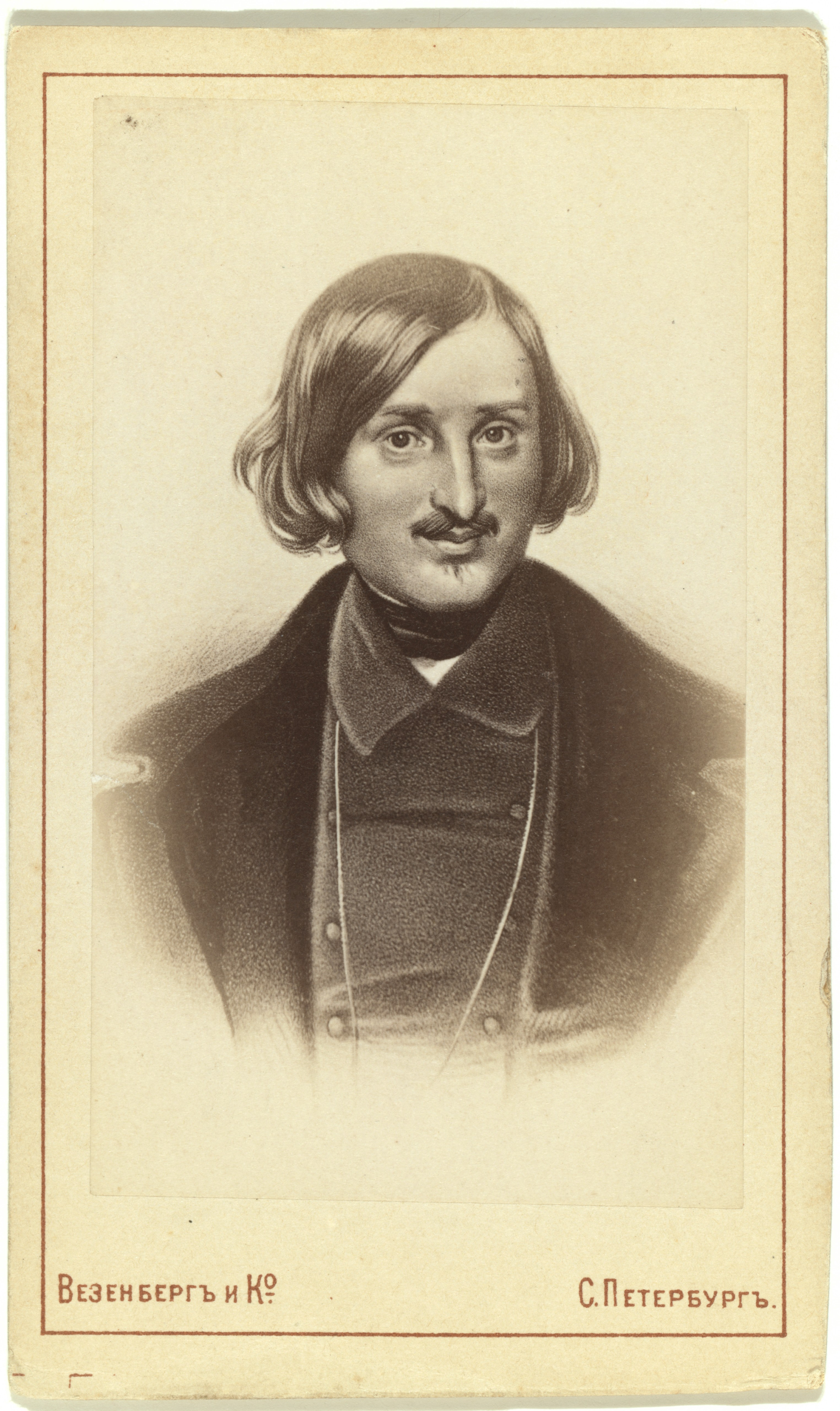
A lithograph portrait of Nikolai Gogol published by Vezenberg & Co., St. Petersburg, between 1880 and 1886.

This is a list of the works by Nikolai Gogol (1809–1852), followed by a list of adaptations of his works:

== Drama ==
- Decoration of Vladimir of the Third Class, unfinished comedy (1832).
- Marriage, comedy (1835, published and premiered 1842).
- The Gamblers, comedy (1836, published 1842, premiered 1843).
- The Government Inspector, also translated as The Inspector General (1836).
- Leaving the Theater, (After the Staging of a New Comedy) (1836)

== Essays ==
- Woman, essay (1830)
- Preface, to first volume of Evenings on a Farm (1831)
- Preface, to second volume of Evenings on a Farm (1832)
- Selected Passages from Correspondence with Friends, collection of letters and essays (1847).
- Meditations on the Divine Liturgy
  - English Translation: Meditations on the Divine Liturgy: of the Holy Eastern Orthodox Catholic and Apostolic Church. Gogol, N. Holy Trinity Publications, 2014. ISBN 9780884653431

== Fiction ==
- Evenings on a Farm Near Dikanka, volume I of short story collection (1831):
  - "The Fair at Sorochintsï"
  - "St John's Eve"
  - "May Night, or the Drowned Maiden"
  - "The Lost Letter: A Tale Told by the Sexton of the N...Church"
- Evenings on a Farm Near Dikanka, volume II of short story collection (1832):
  - "Christmas Eve"
  - "A Terrible Vengeance"
  - "Ivan Fyodorovich Shponka and His Aunt"
  - "A Bewitched Place"
- Mirgorod, short story collection in two volumes (1835):
  - "The Old World Landowners"
  - "Taras Bulba"
  - "Viy"
  - "The Tale of How Ivan Ivanovich Quarreled with Ivan Nikiforovich"
- Arabesques, short story collection (1835):
  - "The Portrait"
  - "A Chapter from an Historical Novel" (fragment)
  - "Nevsky Prospect"
  - "The Prisoner" (fragment)
  - "Diary of a Madman"
- "The Nose", short story (1835–1836)
- "The Carriage", short story (1836)
- "Rome", fragment (1842)
- Dead Souls, novel (1842), intended as the first part of a trilogy.
- "The Overcoat" (variant of translation: "The Overcoat of an official"), short story (1843)
- Petersburg Tales (1843)
  - "Nevsky Prospect"
  - "The Portrait"
  - "Diary of a Madman"
  - "The Nose"
  - "The Overcoat"

== Fictional periods ==
Gogol's short stories composed between 1830 and 1835 are set in Ukraine, and are sometimes referenced collectively as his Ukrainian tales.

His short stories composed between 1835 and 1842 are set in Petersburg, and are sometimes referenced collectively as his St Petersburg tales.

== Poetry ==
- Ode to Italy, poem (1829)
- Hanz Küchelgarten, narrative poem published under the pseudonym "V. Alov" (1829)

== Selected compilations in English translation ==
- St. John's Eve and Other Stories, trans. Isabel Florence Hapgood (Thomas Y. Crowell & Co, 1886)
- The Mantle and Other Stories, trans. Claud Field (T. Werner Laurie, 1915)
- Taras Bulba and Other Tales, trans. C. J. Hogarth (Dent, 1918)
- The Overcoat and Other Stories, trans. Constance Garnett (Chatto & Windus, 1923)
- Tales of Good and Evil, trans. David Magarshack (Lehmann, 1949). Later reprinted as The Overcoat and Other Tales of Good and Evil, with two stories added and "Taras Bulba" removed.
- The Diary of a Madman and Other Stories, trans. Andrew R. MacAndrew (New American Library, 1960)
- Collected Tales and Plays, ed. Leonard J. Kent (Pantheon, 1964). Revised editions of Garnett's translations.
- Diary of a Madman and Other Stories, trans. Ronald Wilks (Penguin, 1972)
- Plays and Petersburg Tales, trans. Christopher English (Oxford University Press, 1995)
- The Collected Tales of Nikolai Gogol, trans. Richard Pevear and Larissa Volokhonsky (Pantheon, 1998)
- And the Earth Will Sit on the Moon, trans. Oliver Ready (Pushkin Press, 2019)
- The Nose and Other Stories, trans. Susanne Fusso (Columbia University Press, 2020)

== Adaptations ==
=== Film ===
- 1913: The Night Before Christmas, a 41-minute film by Ladislas Starevich which contains some of the first combinations of stop motion animation with live action
- 1926: The Overcoat, a Soviet silent film directed by Grigori Kozintsev and Leonid Trauberg
- 1945: The Lost Letter, the Soviet Union's first feature-length traditionally animated film
- 1949: The Inspector General, a musical comedy and very loose adaptation directed by Henry Koster and starring Danny Kaye.
- 1951: The Night Before Christmas, an animated feature film directed by the Brumberg sisters
- 1952: Il Cappotto, an Italian film directed by Alberto Lattuada
- 1959: The Overcoat, a Soviet film directed by Aleksey Batalov
- 1960: Black Sunday, an Italian horror film directed by Mario Bava and based on the Nikolai Gogol story "Viy".
- 1962: Taras Bulba, a Yugoslavian/American film directed by J. Lee Thompson
- 1963: The Nose, a short film by Alexandre Alexeieff and Claire Parker using pinscreen animation
- 1967: Viy, a horror film made on Mosfilm and based on the Nikolai Gogol story of the same name.
- 1984: Dead Souls, directed by Mikhail Shveytser
- 1997: The Night Before Christmas, a 26-minute stop-motion-animated film
- 2014: Viy 3D, a fantasy film
- 20??: The Overcoat, an upcoming film by acclaimed animator Yuri Norstein, being worked on since 1981

=== Opera ===
- 1874: Vakula the Smith, an opera by Pyotr Tchaikovsky
- 1880: May Night, an opera by Nikolai Rimsky-Korsakov
- 1885: Cherevichki, Tchaikovsky's revision of Vakula the Smith
- 1906: Zhenitba, an unfinished opera begun in 1868 by Modest Mussorgsky
- 1917: The Fair at Sorochyntsi, an unfinished opera begun in 1874 by Modest Mussorgsky and first completed by César Cui – many different versions exist
- 1930: The Nose, a satirical opera by Dmitri Shostakovich
- 1976: Dead Souls, an opera by Rodion Shchedrin
- 2011: Gogol, an opera by Russian composer Lera Auerbach commissioned by Vienna's Theater an der Wien

=== Radio ===
- 2006: Dead Souls, a BBC radio adaptation

== Sources ==
- Golub, Spencer. 1998. "Gogol, Nikolai (Vasilievich)." In The Cambridge Guide to Theatre. Ed. Martin Banham. Cambridge: Cambridge UP. 431–432. ISBN 0-521-43437-8.
