= Shponka and His Aunt =

Shponka and His Aunt is an opera in one act by composer Anastasiya Bespalova. The opera uses a Russian libretto by Arkady Zastyrets which is based upon the story of the same name by Nikolai Gogol. The opera was commissioned by the Mariinsky Theatre along with two other new operas, Svetlana Nesterova's The Lawsuit and Vyacheslav Kruglik's The Carriage, all based on stories by Gogol. The three operas premiered together on 21 June 2009 during the Mariinsky Theatre's summer festival.

== Roles ==
Roles, voice types, premiere cast
Role	Voice type	Premiere cast, 21 June 2009 Conductor: Valery Gergiev
Ivan Fyodorovich Shponka	bass-baritone	Andrei Serov
Aunt Vasilisa Tsupchevska	mezzo-soprano	Elizaveta Zakharova
Grigory Grigorievich Storchenko	tenor	Andrei Popov
