= The Lawsuit (opera) =

The Lawsuit is a comic opera in one act by composer Svetlana Nesterova. The opera uses a Russian libretto by Vera Kupriyanova and the composer which is based upon Nikolai Gogol's fragmentary scene "The Lawsuit". The opera was commissioned by the Mariinsky Theatre along with two other new operas, Anastasia Bespalova's Shponka and His Aunt and Vyacheslav Kruglik's The Carriage, all based on stories by Gogol. The three operas premiered together on 21 June 2009 during the Mariinsky Theatre's summer festival.

== Roles ==
- Pavel Petrovich Burdyukov
- Khristophor Petrovich Burdyukov
- Alexander Ivanovich Proletov
