= The Lost Letter =

The Lost Letter or A Lost Letter may refer to:

- The Lost Letter: A Tale Told by the Sexton of the N...Church, a tale from the collection Evenings on a Farm Near Dikanka by Nikolai Gogol
- The Lost Letter (1945 film), a Soviet animated film
- The Lost Letter (1972 film), a Soviet musical-tragicomedy film
- A Lost Letter (1953 film), a Romanian historical comedy film
