= The Carriage (opera) =

Comic opera written by Vyacheslav Kruglik

The Carriage (Russian: Коляска, IPA: [Kolj'aska]) is a comic opera in one act written by Vyacheslav Kruglik. The opera uses a Russian libretto by Vera Kupriyanova and the composer which is based upon the story of the eponymous story by Nikolai Gogol.

The opera was commissioned by the Mariinsky Theatre based on a competition to create operas based on the stories of Gogol. Three operas won the competition, Svetlana Nesterova's The Lawsuit and Anastasia Bespalova's Shponka and His Aunt, and Kruglik's opera and were all overseen by directors from the workshop of Kama Ginkas. The three operas premiered together on 21 June 2009 during the Mariinsky Theatre's summer festival, and was conducted by Valery Gergiev. The choreography was created by Anna Belich.

== Roles ==
Role	Voice Type	Cast (Premiere)
General	Bass	
Chertokutsky, a landowner	Baritone	
Chertokutsky's young wife	Soprano	
First Chief Officer	Tenor	
Second Chief Officier	Tenor	
Third Chief Officer	Baritone	Andrei Bodarenko
Soldier	Tenor	
Footman	Tenor	
Groom	Tenor	
Chorus	Bass	

== Further links ==
- Aria of the Beauty (Lyudmila Shikhova. Ensemble of cellists of St. Petersburg)
