= May Night =

Opera by Nikolai Rimsky-Korsakov

- Opera by Nikolai Rimsky-Korsakov
- Leonid Sobinov as Levko, Bolshoi Theatre in 1909
- Native title: Russian: Майская ночь, romanized: Mayskaya noch
- Language: Russian
- Based on: "May Night, or the Drowned Maiden" by Nikolai Gogol
- Premiere: 1892; Mariinsky Theatre, St. Petersburg

May Night (Russian: Майская ночь, romanized: Mayskaya noch) is a comic opera in three acts, four scenes, by Nikolai Rimsky-Korsakov from a libretto by the composer which is based on Nikolai Gogol's story "May Night, or the Drowned Maiden", from his collection Evenings on a Farm Near Dikanka (1829-1832).

The work was composed between 1878 and 1879 and first performed in 1880 at the Mariinsky Theatre in Saint Petersburg in Russia.

May Night is not part of the standard operatic repertoire in the West.

== Performance history ==
The St. Petersburg premiere took place on 21 January (O.S. 9 January) 1880 at the Mariinsky Theatre. It was conducted by Eduard Nápravník.

Other notable performances followed. In 1892 in Moscow, the Russian Private Opera's performance at the Shelaputin's Theatre was conducted by Iosif Pribik. Another Russian Private Opera production in 1898 was conducted by Sergei Rachmaninoff, while the Bolshoi Theatre presented the opera in 1909 conducted by Vyacheslav Suk.

== Roles ==
Role	Voice type	Premiere cast 21 January (O.S. 9 January),1880 (Conductor: Eduard Nápravník)
Village-Head (Mayor)	bass	Fyodor Stravinsky
Levko, his son	tenor	Pyotr Lodiy
Mayor's sister-in-law	mezzo-soprano	Anna Bichurina
(Ganna) Hanna	mezzo-soprano	Mariya Slavina
Clerk	bass	Vladimir Sobolyov
Distiller	tenor	Nikolay Ende
Kalenik	bass	Ivan Melnikov
Pannochka, rusalka	soprano	Feodosiya Velinskaya
Brood-Hen, rusalka	mezzo-soprano	
Raven, rusalka	soprano	
Stepmother, rusalka	mezzo-soprano	
Chorus, silent roles" Lads, lasses, village police, rusalki (drowned maidens)

Note: The Village-Head (Голова, Golova) is usually translated "Mayor". "Pannochka" is a diminutive of "Panna", a title in Polish and Ukrainian for an unmarried lady.

== Synopsis ==
Time: Whitsuntide or "Rusalka week", beginning of the 19th century
Place: Near the village of Dikanka, Ukraine

=== Act 1 ===
Village street outside Hanna's hut; evening

The people sing a folksong-game. After they disperse, Levko plays the bandura and sings outside Hanna's window. When she steps outside, she's afraid that people will be watching them. After some endearing exchanges, she asks about the old house across the way, over the pond. He tells her that a widower used to live there; his daughter (Pannochka), lived with him, and he decided to marry again. The new stepmother turned out to be a witch, and caused the father to banish his daughter from the house. In sorrow she drowned herself in the pond and became leader of the other rusalki (drowned maidens). One night, while they were all dancing in the moonlight, they saw the witch walking by, grabbed her, and pulled her into the water. The story goes that, now, when someone comes by the pond, Pannochka asks the person to point out which of them is the stepmother.

The story over, Hanna goes inside, and some maidens come around singing a sad "rusalka" song. In stumbles the drunken Kalenik on his way home; he tries dance the hopak and to kiss the girls, but they send him away to the Mayor's house, tricking him into thinking that it's his own.

When all is clear, the Mayor sneaks in, calling for Hanna; from the side, Levko notices that someone is there, and watches. The Mayor, who has his eyes on marrying Hanna, tries to impress her with his oft-repeated story about being a guide for Catherine the Great, but Hanna rebuffs him, sends him off, and goes inside. Levko calls the village lads together and teaches them a song to mock the Mayor and use in playing a trick on him.

=== Act 2 ===
Scene 1: Interior of the Mayor's hut; late evening

The Mayor and his sister-in-law are entertaining the Distiller at dinner. The Distiller will soon be tearing down the old house by the pond to build a distillery. Kalenik mistakenly bursts in and causes a mild disturbance; then a rock breaks through a window, causing the Mayor to curse the unseen perpetrator outside. In superstitious alarm the Distiller warns the Mayor against such language, relating the story of his late mother-in-law and the ghost that haunted her because of her cursing at him in life. Suddenly, outside, the village lads start singing the taunting song that Levko taught them. The wind blows out the lights, and in the commotion the Mayor captures someone he thinks is the perpetrator, and locks "him" up in a side room. The Clerk enters to report that the lads are running about the village and that he has captured their leader. The Mayor, in disbelief, calls for a light, and they open the locked room. Out comes the Sister-in-Law, sobbing and not a little enraged. She goes outside. The Clerk, the Distiller, and the Mayor set off to find the scoundrel once and for all.

Scene 2: Village street outside the Clerk's hut; moonlit night

Outside the Clerk's hut, where the alleged true perpetrator is locked up, the three approach in trepidation. Crossing themselves against Satan, they open the door, and again out comes the Sister-in-Law, infinitely more angry than before. Then the village police arrive, holding Kalenik mistakenly as prisoner. With the police afraid to proceed, the Mayor threatens them with the wrath of the commissar, and they run off in obedience.

=== Act 3 ===
Shore of the lake near the old gentleman's house; luminous moonlit night

Beside the pond, Levko sings to his absent beloved, then asks the moon to shine its light on the path to her abode. A window opens in the old house, and Pannochka appears, begging Levko to sing further. He doesn't seem to notice her at first, but a strange feeling comes over him, and he sings again. Then the rusalki appear on the shore and dance. Overcoming his astonishment, Levko joins in singing their round-dance, while Pannochka begs Levko to find the stepmother-witch.

Then the rusalki begin to play the game called "Raven." The first raven-maiden finds that she cannot continue, and Levko realizes that she can't be the witch. But the second player of that role – the stepmother – exposes her true self; Levko points her out, and the other rusalki jump on her and drag her down to the depths of the pond. In gratitude, Pannochka gives Levko a letter to show to his father, and disappears as dawn breaks. Given that he cannot read, he does not know what the letter contains.

The Mayor and the policemen arrive and grab Levko. The Mayor is surprised to find that the disguised miscreant is his own son. Levko shows his father the letter, which is passed on to the Clerk to read out loud. The letter turns out to be from the commissar, and instructs the Mayor to allow his son to marry Hanna. As the villagers come on the scene to greet the new day, Levko invents the story that the commissar will be coming for dinner, and the Mayor, puffed up with his own importance, gives in to the marriage. Levko and Hanna say a prayer for Pannochka, Kalenik stumbles in again, and the Sister-in-Law gives the Mayor another verbal brow-beating, as the people celebrate.

== Principal arias and numbers ==
Overture

Act 1

Song: "The sun is down, evening is near" (Levko)
Duet: (Hanna, Levko)
Trio: "Love me, love me, beautiful maiden" (Hanna, Levko, Village-Head)
Song: "Song about the Mayor" (Levko, Lads)

Act 2

Scene: The Distiller's Narrative (Distiller)

Act 3

Song: "Sleep my beauty, sleep sweetly!" (Levko)
Duettino: (Pannochka, Levko)

== Structure ==
Overture

Act 1

No.1 — Khorovod "Proso" (Chorus)
No.2 — Song (Levko)
No.3 — Duet (Levko, Hanna)
No.4 — Tale (Levko)
No.5 — Recitative and Song (Levko, Hanna, Chorus)
No.6 — Hopak (Kalenik, Maidens)
No.7 — Trio and Chorus (Mayor, Levko, Hanna, Lads)
No.8 — Recitative and Chorus "Song about the Mayor" (Levko, Lads)

Act 2
Scene 1

No.9 — Trio (Mayor, Sister-in-Law, Distiller)
No.10 — Scene with Kalenik and the Distiller's Tale (Kalenik, Mayor, Sister-in-Law, Distiller)
No.11 — Scene and Trio "Song about the Mayor" (Mayor, Sister-in-Law, Distiller, Levko, Lads, Clerk, Police)

Scene 2

No.12 — Finale (Mayor, Clerk, Distiller)

Act 3

No.13 — Scene of the Rusalki (Levko, Pannochka, Rusalki)

a) Ukrainian Night and Levko's Song
b) Chorus of the Rusalki
c) Khorovod of the Rusalki
d) Dances and Games of the Rusalki
e) Duettino
f) Sunrise

No.14 — Scene and Song (Mayor, Levko, Clerk, Distiller, Chorus, Hanna)
No.15 — Finale (All)

== Related works ==
- Alexander Dargomyzhsky: Rusalka (1855)
- Mykola Lysenko: The Drowned Woman (1883)
- Antonín Dvořák: Rusalka (1900)

May Night features the folk character the rusalka, but the work should not be confused with either of the two operas named Rusalka, by Dargomyzhsky (based on Pushkin) and Dvořák (based on Erben and Němcová). Lysenko's opera, on the other hand, is also based on Gogol's story.

== Recordings ==
Audio Recordings (Mainly studio recordings)

- 1946, Nikolay Golovanov (conductor), Moscow Radio Choir and Orchestra, Moscow Radio Chorus, Sergey Krasovsky (Village-Head), Pyotr Malyutenko (Levko), Mariya Maksakova (Hanna), Georgiy Abramov (Village Clerk), Sergey Streltsov (Distiller), Yelizaveta Antonova (Sister-in-law), Yelizaveta Shumskaya (Pannochka)
- 1948, Vasiliy Nebolsin (conductor), Bolshoy Theater Orchestra and Chorus, Sergey Krasovsky (Village-Head), Sergey Lemeshev (Levko), Vera Borisenko (Hanna), Pavel Volovov (Kalenik), Vsevolod Tyutyunnik (Village Clerk), Venyamin Shevtsov (Distiller), Yevgeniya Verbitskaya (Sister-in-law), Irina Maslennikova (Pannochka)
- 1974, Vladimir Fedoseyev (conductor), Moscow Radio Symphony Orchestra, Moscow Radio Chorus, Aleksey Krivchenya (Village-Head), Konstantin Lisovsky (Levko), Lyudmila Sapegina (Hanna), Ivan Budrin (Kalenik), Gennadiy Troitsky (Clerk), Yuriy Yelnikov (Distiller), Anna Matyushina (Sister-in-law), Olga Pastusenko (Pannochka)
- 1994, Andrey Chistyakov (conductor), Bolshoy Theater Orchestra, Sveshnikov Academic Choir, Vyacheslav Pochapsky (Village-Head), Vitaly Taraschenko (Levko), Nataliya Erasova (Hanna), Pyotr Glubokiy (Clerk), Aleksandr Arkhipov (Distiller), Nikolay Reshetnyak (Kalenik), Yelena Okolycheva (Sister-in-law), Marina Lapina (Pannochka)
- 1994, Aleksandr Lazarev (conductor), Kölner Rundfunk Sinfonie-Orchester, Kölner Rundfunkchor, Vladimir Matorin (Village-Head), Vladimir Bogachov (Levko), Tatyana Erastova (Hanna), Maksim Mikhailov (Village Clerk), Vladimir Kudryashov (Distiller), Galina Borisova (Sister-in-law), Yelena Brilova (Pannochka), Mikhail Krutikov (Kalenik)

Source: www.operadis-opera-discography.org.uk

=== Video ===
- 2008 Live performance. Dmitry Ulyanov (Mayor), Oleg Polpudin (Levko), Natalia Vladimirskaya (Hanna), Irina Chistyakova (Mayor’s sister-in-Law), Roman Ulybin (clerk), Vyacheslav Voynarovsky (distiller), Anatoly Loshak (Kalenik), Valeria Zaytseva (Pannochka), Maria Lobanova, Maria Suvorova, Ella Feyginova (three mermaids). Orchestra, Chorus, Soloists, Dancers and Actors of the Stanislavsky and Nemirovich-Danchenko Moscow Academic Music Theatre, Felix Korobov (conductor). Stage Director, Alexander Titel.
