= The Portrait (opera) =

Opera by Mieczysław Weinberg

- Opera by Mieczysław Weinberg
- Native title: Russian: Портрет
- Librettist: Alexander Medvedev
- Based on: The Portrait by Nikolai Gogol
- Premiere: 20 May 1983; Janáček State Theatre, Brno

The Portrait (Russian: Портрет, Portret) is an opera in eight scenes composed by Mieczysław Weinberg to a libretto by Alexander Medvedev based on Nikolai Gogol's short story The Portrait.

A penniless artist, Chartkov, finds a magical painting that offers him a dilemma – to struggle to make his own way in the world on the basis of his own talents, or to accept the assistance of the magic painting to guaranteed riches and fame. He chooses to become rich and famous, but soon comes to realise that he has made the wrong choice in this satire on artistic integrity and the art market.

The opera was composed in 1980 and received its first performance on 20 May 1983 at the Janáček State Theatre in Brno. The first performance of the reduced version took place in 1992 in Moscow performed by the Moscow Chamber Opera. After years of obscurity, The Portrait saw a revival at the Bregenzer Festspiele in July 2010, in a production by John Fulljames that also appeared in Kaiserslautern in December of that year, with both runs sung in German. A second production, by David Pountney, was toured by Opera North in February 2011 in English (the British premiere) and in Nancy by the Opéra national de Lorraine in April 2011, sung in Russian.

== Roles ==
- Chartkov, a painter (tenor)
- Nikita, Chartkov's valet (baritone)
- Journalist (baritone)
- Lamplighter (tenor)
- Chartkov's painting teacher (baritone)
- Art store owner / Dignitary (bass)
- Landlord / Count (baritone)
- District chief / General (bass)
- Market woman / Lady-in-waiting (soprano)
- First merchant / First waiter / Turk (tenor)
- Second merchant / Second waiter /Cavalryman of the Guards (tenor)
- Third merchant (bass)
- Distinguished lady (mezzo-soprano)
- Lisa, her daughter (soprano)
- Nobleman (tenor)

Dancers and mute roles: girl from the painting of Psyche, old man from Petromikhali's portrait, people at the market, visitors at the vernissage

== Sources ==
- Bregenzer Festspiele, Symposium: In a Strange Land, 2010 (accessed 28 June 2010)
- Darlington and Stockton Times, "Wagner’s Ring cycle in view for Opera North audiences", 12 February 2010 (accessed 28 June 2010)
- Nikitina, Lyudmila Dmitriyevna (2001). "Weinberg [Vaynberg], Moisey [Mieczysław] Samuilovich". In Sadie, Stanley; Tyrrell, John (eds.). The New Grove Dictionary of Music and Musicians (2nd ed.). London: Macmillan Publishers. ISBN 978-1-56159-239-5.
- Sikorski Musikverlage, Mieczysław Weinberg, 2 June 2010 (accessed 28 June 2010)
