= The Carriage =

1836 short story by Nikolai Gogol

- Short story by Nikolai Gogol
- Original title: Коляска

Publication
- Publication date: 1836

"The Carriage" (or "The Coach" in some translations; Russian: Коляска) is an 1836 short story by Nikolai Gogol, one of his shortest works. The story centers on the life of a former cavalry officer and landowner near a small Russian town. After reading the story, Anton Chekhov wrote to Alexei Suvorin, "What an artist he is! His 'Carriage' alone is worth two hundred thousand rubles. Sheer delight, nothing less."

== Background ==
Nikolai Vasilyevich Gogol (1809–1852) was a well-known Russian novelist and short-story writer. He was born and raised in Ukraine and moved to St. Petersburg in 1828. His short story "The Carriage" was published in the first volume of Pushkin's literary journal The Contemporary in 1836. It is speculated that Gogol wrote the short story to echo Pushkin's Tales of Belkin, as he mimics Pushkin's use of anecdotes, irony, and structure in media res. It is classified as one of his Petersburg tales (along with "Nevsky Prospekt", "The Diary of a Madman", "The Nose", "The Overcoat", and "The Portrait"). The Petersburg Tales create a profile of St. Petersburg as the only modern city in imperial Russia. The stories focus on the great administrative city's indifference to the plight of individuals, describing the personal narratives of people rebelling against its climate.

== Characters ==
- Pyfagor Pifagorovich Chertokutsky—one of the chief aristocrats and landowners of the B. region. He formerly served in a cavalry regiment and was a notable officer but had to resign due to some scandal. He wears clothing after the style of cavalry uniforms to demonstrate his esteemed status, and attends many balls and gatherings in order to meet respected officers. He is considered a “good and proper” landowner.
- Brigadier general—an esteemed military commander in the Russian cavalry. He hosts a lavish dinner party that Chertokutsky attends. He is described as “stocky and corpulent” and has a deep, imposing voice.
- The colonel—a staff officer of the general's regiment. He attends the dinner parties hosted by the general and Chertokutsky.
- The fat major—another staff officer of the regiment who is present at both dinner parties.
- Chertokutsky's wife—the mistress of Chertokutsky's house. She is described as young, pretty, and lovely.

== Plot summary ==
The story opens in the town of B., where things are drab, depressing and boring until a cavalry regiment moves into the area. Once the regiment is stationed in the town, the area becomes lively, animated, and full of color, with neighboring landowners coming into town frequently to socialize with officers and attend various gatherings and parties. One of the landowners and a chief aristocrat, Pythagoras Chertokutsky, attends a party at the general's house. When the general shows off his beautiful mare to the party attendees, Chertokutsky mentions he has a splendid coach that he paid around four-thousand rubles for, hoping to impress the other guests (although in reality he owns nothing of the sort). The other men express interest in seeing the carriage, so he invites them to dinner on the following day. During the remainder of the general's party, he gets caught up in playing cards and forgets the time, getting home around four in the morning, drunk. Because of this, he forgets to tell his wife about the party and is roused from sleep when his wife sees some carriages approaching their house. He at once remembers the dinner party that he agreed to host, but has his servants tell everyone that he is gone for the day, going to hide in the coach. The general and his friends are upset by his absence, but wish to see his magnificent coach anyway and go to the carriage house to look at it. They are unimpressed by the ordinary coach that he actually owns and examine it thoroughly, wondering if maybe there is something special hidden inside. They open the apron inside the coach and find Chertokutsky hiding inside. The general simply exclaims "Ah, you are here," slams the door, and covers him up again with the apron.

== Themes ==
"The Carriage" is a prime example of efficient use of the short-story form, with small sentences conveying large amounts of detail about the story's characters and their general environment. A few specific details about the feast, such as the unbuttoned coats of the officers and the increasingly nonsensical questions of the officers, offer a concise and convincing synopsis of the drunken cavalry officers’ party. It is not hard for the reader to fill in the gaps between Gogol's descriptions, as the drunkenness leads to boasting on the part of all parties involved, including the now-retired officer Chertokutsky. The story itself ends in something of a fabular fashion, with the general simply closing the carriage and leaving the braggadocious Chertokutsky to himself.

The story is riddled with typical Gogolian archetypes – the narrator is unreliable and the world, while for the most part relatively normal-seeming, is riddled with random bits of illogicality, as well as dry irony that conveys the depressing nature of the milieu. For example, early in the story, the narrator notes “as for the gardens, they were cut down long ago on the mayor’s orders, to improve appearances”– in Gogol's illogical world, tearing down aesthetically pleasing edifices improves the overall appearances of the town, which is simply called B. The same mayor gives the name “Frenchmen” to the local animals, which apparently move into the streets at the slightest drop of rain, which turns the dust on the roads to mud. The town is made lively by the appearance of a cavalry regiment, of all things, which implicitly suggests the otherwise its horrifically bland, bleak existence – “a surface brilliance that emphasizes the essential hollowness [of the town].”

Perhaps the best indicator of the story's essential Gogolian character is its quintessential poshlost, the self-satisfied pettiness of the otherwise pitiable main characters. As Vladimir Nabokov described Akaki Akakievich (from another Gogol story, "The Overcoat"): “Something is very wrong and all men are mild lunatics engaged in pursuits that seem to them very important while an absurdly logical force keeps them at their futile jobs.” Chertokutsky, the main character, fits into this archetype well, as he obsesses over receiving some modicum of attention from the cavalry officers to the point of lying about his possession of an impressive carriage in order to lure them to his estate.

"The Carriage" marks one of Gogol’s final attempts to primarily foray into humor and illogicality without searching for deeper meaning. James Woodward’s The Symbolic Art of Gogol concludes that the story was written during the same time as the third chapter of his most famous novel, Dead Souls. As he increasingly relied on religious inspiration to write his epic novel, Gogol attempted to reconcile the themes of his earlier work with the more serious tome, which is distinct from his earlier tales in its attempt to depict the redemption of mankind. Ultimately, Gogol remarked that he had to move past the “carelessness and laziness” of his earlier work and “do something serious”, but he also burned the manuscript of the planned second volume of Dead Souls, in which Chichikov is redeemed, thus leaving the theme of redemption unexplored.

== Adaptations ==
- A one act opera based on the story and also entitled The Carriage was composed by Vyacheslav Kruglik and commissioned by the Mariinsky Theatre. Kruglik won the All-Russian Mariinsky Theatre Competition in 2005 for this composition.

== English translations ==
- Andrew R. MacAndrew: The Diary of a Madman and Other Stories. Signet Classics.
- Richard Pevear, Larissa Volokhonsky: The Collected Tales of Nikolai Gogol. Vintage Classics.
- Ronald Wilks: The Diary of a Madman, The Government Inspector and Selected Stories. Penguin Classics.
- Oliver Ready: And the Earth will Sit on the Moon. Pushkin Press.
