= The Portrait (short story) =

Short story by Nikolai Gogol

"The Portrait" (Russian: Портрет) is a short story by Russian author Nikolai Gogol, originally published in the short story collection Arabesques in 1835. It was significantly revised in 1842. The story shares themes with some of his earlier works such as "St. John's Eve" and "Viy".

== Plot summary ==
"The Portrait" is the story of a young and penniless artist, Chartkov, who stumbles upon a terrifyingly lifelike portrait in an art shop and is compelled to buy it. The painting is magical and offers him a dilemma — to struggle to make his own way in the world on the basis of his own talents or to accept the assistance of the magic painting to guaranteed riches and fame. He chooses to become rich and famous, but when he comes upon a portrait from another artist which is "pure, faultless, beautiful as a bride" he comes to realize that he has made the wrong choice. Eventually, he falls ill and dies from a fever.

=== Part I ===
The first part of the story takes place in nineteenth-century Saint Petersburg, Russia and follows a penniless yet talented young artist, Andrey Petrovich Chartkov. One day, Chartkov stumbles upon an old art shop, where he discovers a strikingly lifelike portrait of an old man whose eyes “stared even out of the portrait itself, as if destroying its harmony by their strange aliveness.” On an inexplicable impulse, Chartkov uses the last of his money to buy the portrait, which the art shop's dealer seems glad to be rid of. Chartkov returns to his shabby apartment and hangs up the painting, but is so haunted by the old man's stare he covers it with a bed sheet before going to bed.

That night, Chartkov dreams the old man in the portrait comes alive and steps out of his frame with a sack of money. Twice, Chartkov wakes up and realizes he is still dreaming, but on the third time he wakes for real and realizes he imagined both the portrait's movement and its money. However, “it seemed to him that amidst the dream there had been some terrible fragment of reality.” Shortly thereafter, Chartkov's landlord arrives with a police inspector, demanding the rent. Chartkov is at a loss for what to do until the clumsy inspector accidentally cracks open the portrait's frame, revealing a pouch filled with one thousand gold sovereigns. Dumbfounded, Chartkov pays what he owes and begins making grand plans for the projects he can complete with his newfound wealth, recalling the encouraging words of his old mentor to “ponder over every work” and nurse his talent, while ignoring the superficial, “fashionable” styles of the times.

However, Chartkov 's plans quickly go up in smoke, and instead he uses his riches on lavish items and an ad in the papers. He soon uses his new apartment on Nevsky Prospect to host the customers brought in by the ad. At first, Chartkov attempts to paint his subjects in his own style, as his mentor had advised, but he soon falls into more “fashionable” styles in order to keep his customers happy. Though his “doorbell was constantly ringing,” his art becomes choked, and he resorts to “the general color scheme that is given by rote.” His reputation spreads and he is showered with countless compliments and immense wealth, but as the narrator remarks: “fame cannot give pleasure to one who did not merit it but stole it.”

Many years pass, and Chartkov achieves such a high reputation he is asked by the Academy of Arts to examine the work of another prominent artist, one who devoted his life to studying art in Italy. When Chartkov arrives at the gallery, he is struck by the painting, which he describes as “pure, immaculate, beautiful as a bride.” In this artist's work Chartkov realizes what he missed out on and is so struck he bursts into tears and flees the gallery.

At home in his studio, Chartkov attempts to revive the old talent he once had but inevitably fails, and in a fit of anger rids himself of the portrait of the old man and begins buying up “all the best that art produced” and bringing it home to tear it to shreds. His madness eventually manifests itself into a physical illness, Chartkov and dies, haunted to the end by memories of the horrible portrait.

=== Part II ===
The second half of “The Portrait” opens several years after the events of Part I, at an art auction held at an old nobleman's house at which the sinister portrait is put up for sale. In the midst of the bids, a young man appears who claims he has “perhaps more right to this portrait than anyone else.” He promptly begins telling the audience his story.

His father was an artist who worked in Kolomna, a tired, “ashen” part of St. Petersburg, which was also the home of a strange moneylender. This moneylender was rumored to be capable of providing “any sum to anyone,” but bizarre and terrible events always seemed to happen to those who borrowed from him. Specifically, his borrowers developed qualities contrary to their previous personalities: a sober man became a drunkard; a fine young nobleman turns on his wife and beats her. Many of his customers even died unnaturally early deaths.

One day, the moneylender comes to the artist asking for his portrait to be painted, and the artist agrees, grateful for the chance to paint such a peculiar subject. However, as soon as he begins painting the moneylender's eyes, “there arose such a strange revulsion in his soul” he refused to paint any more. Despite the moneylender begging him to finish, the artist holds firm, and the moneylender dies shortly thereafter, leaving the portrait in the artist's possession.

Inexplicably bizarre events begin happening in the artist's life. He becomes jealous of one of his pupils (revealed to be the young Chartkov), attempts to sabotage him, flies into rages, chases away his children and comes close to beating his wife. To make amends, the artist attempts to burn the portrait, but a friend stops him, taking the painting for his own instead. After witnessing its evil nature, his friend eventually passes the portrait to his nephew, who sells it to an art collector, who hawks it to someone else, and eventually the portrait's trail is lost. The artist feels immense guilt over the evil piece of art and makes his son promise to track it down and destroy it.

This is the reason which brought the young man to the art auction. However, once he concludes his story and his audience turns to examine the portrait, they find it missing: someone must have taken it while they were listening to the young man's story. They wonder if they had seen it at all.

== Influences ==
It has been argued that Gogol's influences can be traced to Western sources. That the plot of the demonic Kunstlernovelle seems largely derivative of Western authors such as E. T. A. Hoffmann, Edgar Allan Poe, Charles Robert Maturin or Washington Irving. Author Eva Guðmundsdóttir compares Poe with Gogol and places them both in a category of the fantastic. Washington Irving, E. T. A. Hoffmann and Charles Robert Maturin are also credited with influencing Gogol. This places him in a wider literary tradition and connects him with the work being produced in the West.

== Themes ==
Simon Karlinsky labelled "The Portrait" as the ‘most conventional’ of Gogol's St Petersburg Tales and ‘the least satisfactory artistically.' This follows the general theme that is less humorous and more regarding artistic value. An explanation for this difference is offered in the hope of elevating the seriousness of the piece. That he forgoes the comic along with narrative polyphone in the interests of a high seriousness ‘which he would only later recognize might be available without such crippling sacrifice.' He is aware with the other Tales that the comic aspect is what makes them attainable and interesting to the reader and by losing this crucial part the story loses its relatability and consequently its interest. Moreover, Innokentii Annenski agrees with the assessment that this is the most conventional of Gogol’s tales. He claimed that in this tale ‘which he wrote twice, Gogol has put more of himself than in any of his other works.'

A key theme of the short story is to express the corrupting influence of money on art. This reflects a general concern among Russian writers in the 1830s about the degradation of culture under the condition of a nascent market economy that came to replace the previous aristocratic patronage system. Indeed, as Robert Maguire has remarked, Chartkov ‘turns himself completely into money, and in spending the money, he spends himself. When it is gone, so is he.’ This speaks to two main themes of the story: the corruption of money and the destruction of illusion on reality. Chartkov's paintings are an ‘illusion of an illusion… as life imitates art and in turn is imitated by art, he becomes merely another version of each of the poses he renders.'

== Relation to Petersburg Texts ==
In "The Portrait", Gogol deviates quite a bit from his conventional writing style; instead of adopting a humorous, even absurd style, he takes a fairly serious tone that is uncommon in his other works. Part of the reason for this change was the underlying purpose behind this piece; unlike his other stories, which had some serious elements but were generally defined by their amusing tone, "The Portrait" was written partly to serve a form of social commentary. The piece was published in a collection of stories called Arabesques; in addition to "The Portrait", Arabesques contained darker works including "Diary of a Madman". Loosely, scholars have grouped literary works that are focused on the failings of society (such as Arabesques) during the mid to late 1800s as Petersburg Texts. Dostoevsky is generally considered to be the most influential author of these texts, but many others contributed to them, including Gogol.

Part of the reason Gogol felt the need to write stories showcasing the true nature of Saint Petersburg and the toxic atmosphere the city (and indeed, the country) bred was that he himself had lived there; he worked briefly there as a government clerk and was struck by “the utter lack of social interaction” among his colleagues at the time. Gogol disapproved of the way in which workers focused solely on advancing in the civil servant system and conveyed this disapproval through his writing: He uses the character of Andrey as a vehicle to highlight the vices posed by greed and fortune that is achieved without actually working for it. Though Andrey is able to attain immediate wealth and fame because of the agreement he makes with the painting, he is eventually driven mad by the talent of other artists and pays the price for his ruthless pursuit of societal advancement. In terms of the city itself, Gogol noted that Saint Petersburg was remarkably bare of organic feeling, and as a result his depiction of it differed from those of authors such as Pushkin in that there was very little geometry depicted in the city. Famous landmarks such as the city's parks and trees were absent in his portrayal of Saint Petersburg in "The Portrait" as Gogol instead emphasized the grim, crowded appearance of its stores and buildings.

In terms of the structure of the piece, Gogol did adhere to a set of guidelines generally shared with other Petersburg texts. Most prominently, "The Portrait" was grounded in a theme that reflected an underlying social problem, in this case being greed and the desperate pursuit of advancement. In addition, by the end of the story we are able to at least partially sympathize with the main character. Andrey ultimately regretted his decision to make the deal with the portrait and expresses remorse over it. As he reaches the end of his life and his sanity gradually gives way, he begins to destroy artwork without discrimination, and our initial disgust for Andrey over his deal with the painting is at least partially replaced with pity. In this way, Gogol demonstrates that though individuals can be flawed, redemption is still possible, albeit in a manner that the reader may not have been expecting. Other Petersburg texts, such "Diary of a Madman" and Notes from Underground, followed similar patterns.

== Reception ==
The Academic American Encyclopedia cited the work as an example of the "conflict between Gogol's idealistic strivings and his sad, cynical view of human propensities". First published in Arabesques, the story was received unfavorably by critics, and Gogol returned to the story, reworking it for the 1842 publication. Simon Karlinsky believes that the second version of the story, with its differing epilogue, works better within the context of the story, but writes that the work, while "a serious treatment of an important social problem", is "too slender a theme" to support the central thrust of the work, an attempt to portray "the great mystical concept of the Antichrist".

== Legacy ==
Gogol's work has influenced the literature that followed. Adrian Wanner writes that Gary Shteyngart's work, ‘Shylock on the Neva’, is a modern-day writing of ‘The Portrait.' The main plot of ‘Shylock on the Neva’ is the same as that of ‘The Portrait’. There is a wealthy St Petersburg man who asks a painter to do his portrait in order to fulfill his desire to be immortalized in art. Some critics have argued that humor is lacking in ‘The Portrait’, Adrian Wanner argues that in rewriting the story, Shteyngart was attempting to ‘Gogolize’ his own tale.

== Adaptations ==
- A silent film from 1915 by Ladislas Starevich.
- The story was the basis of an opera by Mieczysław Weinberg, The Portrait, composed in 1980.
- The story was adapted for BBC Radio in 2002 as part of the BBC Radio 4 comedy series Three Ivans, Two Aunts and an Overcoat with the title "The Mysterious Portrait" and starred Stephen Moore. This adaptation concludes with Chartkov arrogantly defying the image in the painting and paying a terrible price.
- A French comic-book adaptation by François Ravard and Loïc Dauvillier was published as Le portrait in two albums in 2005 and 2007.
