= St. John's Eve (short story) =

1830 short story by Nikolai Gogol

- Short story by Nikolai Gogol
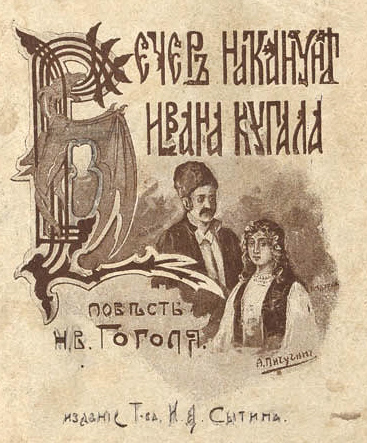
- Cover of illustrated publication of St. John's Eve (1909)
- Original title: Вечер накануне Ивана Купала
- Translator: Isabel Florence Hapgood
- Country: Russian Empire
- Language: Russian
- Genre: horror

Publication
- Published in: Otechestvennye Zapiski
- Publication type: literary magazine
- Media type: Print (periodical)
- Publication date: February–March 1830
- Published in English: 1886

Chronology
- Series: Evenings on a Farm Near Dikanka
The Fair at Sorochyntsi	May Night

"St. John's Eve" (Russian: Вечер накануне Ивана Купала, romanized: Vecher nakanune Ivana Kupala), also known as "The Eve of Ivan Kupala", is the second short story in the collection Evenings on a Farm Near Dikanka by Nikolai Gogol. It was first published in 1830 in the Russian literary periodical Otechestvennye Zapiski and in book form in 1831.

== Plot summary ==
This story is retold by Rudy Panko from Foma Grigorievich, the sexton of the Dikanka church. Rudy is in the middle of reading the story to the reader when Foma interrupts and demands to tell it his way. Foma's grandfather used to live in an old village not far from Dikanka that no longer exists. There lived a Cossack named Korzh, his daughter Pidorka, and his worker Petro. Petro and Pidorka fall in love. One day, Korzh catches Pidorka and Petro kissing and is about to whip Petro, but he stops when his son Ivas pleads for his father not to beat the worker. Korzh instead takes Petro outside and tells him to never come to their home again, and the lovers are distraught. Petro is willing to do anything to see Pidorka again, so he meets with Basavriuk, a stranger who frequents the village tavern and who is believed by the villagers to be the devil himself. Basavriuk tells Petro to meet him in Bear's Ravine in order to obtain the treasure that will allow him to reunite with Pidorka.

When Petro arrives at the location, he is instructed to find and pluck a fern that blooms on Kupala Night. When Petro picks the flower, a witch appears and hands him a spade. Petro digs up the treasure, but he cannot open it until blood has been shed. He is prepared to use his own blood but is presented with Ivas who has been captured. Petro is initially reluctant, but overcome by uncertainty, he decapitates the child and obtains the gold. He then immediately falls asleep for two days, and when he awakens, he sees the gold but cannot remember where it came from. Petro appeases Korzh with the gold, and he marries Pidorka. After they are married, Petro becomes increasingly distant and insane, constantly obsessing over what he has forgotten. As a last resort, Pidorka is convinced to visit the witch for help, and she brings her to their home. Upon seeing the witch, Petro regains his memory of the night and hurls an axe at the witch, who disappears. Ivas appears at the door covered in blood, and Petro is carried away by the devil. All that remains is a pile of ashes where he once stood, and the gold has turned into pieces of broken pottery.

After this, Basavriuk begins to appear in the village again and Pidorka goes on a pilgrimage. Foma's grandfather's aunt still had problems with the devil however; a party is ruined when a roast lamb comes alive, a chalice bows to his grandfather, and a bowl begins to dance. Even after sprinkling the entire area with holy water the tavern remains possessed, so the residents abandon the village.

== Background ==
The story takes place in a Ukrainian village; as such, Gogol uses gastronomy to portray Ukrainian customs, including during the wedding of Petro and Pidorka, the narrator's prayer for his grandfather, and the description of the witch's face ("like a baked apple"). St. John's Eve further reflects Ukrainian traditions in the complicated wedding rites described in the story. The temporal setting is the holiday season, which plays a role in the plot of the story.

The story is considered a Kunstmärchen, a fairy tale that is based in reality or folk tale told by a subjective narrator. Foma Grigorievich, the narrator, describes his grandfather's stories as themselves magically efficacious. In St. John's Eve, as in Gogol's other stories, the laws of nature are often broken; for instance, the devil's gifts float in water.

The genre of the story, much like the characterization of the devil character Basavriuk, is initially romantic comedy and ends as "romantic horror."

== Influences ==
St. John's Eve is considered to contain allusions to E.T.A. Hoffman's Der Sandmann and Ignaz Denner. It also has similarities to Liebeszauber by Ludwig Tieck. The all-powerful demon character has been compared to the occult elements in the works of Hieronymus Bosch.

Gogol used motifs and descriptions of folk customs found in the poetry of Nikolai Markevich, including the descriptions of witches who conceals the stars and of the fern that should be found on Kupala night.

== Significance ==
This short story was famously the main inspiration for the Russian composer Modest Mussorgsky's tone poem Night on Bald Mountain, made known to the wider international audience by its use in Disney's Fantasia. Mussorgsky had abandoned an earlier project, an opera based on the short story.

Nikolai Gogol's work has been compared to that of Oscar Wilde; the beheading of Ivas parallels the murder by Savile in Lord Arthur Savile's Crime. In both stories, the sacrifice of the blood of an innocent is a prerequisite for marriage.

== Adaptations ==
The story was adapted in an eponymous movie from the Ukrainian SSR directed by Yuri Ilyenko, featuring Larisa Kadochnikova and Boris Khmelnitsky in lead roles that was released in the Soviet Union in February 1969.
