= Ivan Fyodorovich Shponka and His Aunt =

1832 short story by Nikolai Gogol

"Ivan Fyodorovich Shponka and His Aunt" (Иван Фёдорович Шпонька и его тётушка, Ivan Fyodorovich Shponka i yevo tyotushka; 1832) is part of Nikolai Gogol's collection of short stories Evenings on a Farm Near Dikanka.

== Origin ==
This story is actually unfinished, and Gogol makes it seem as though Rudy Panko's friend wrote the story down and gave it to him, but his wife, who cannot read, accidentally used some of the book to bake a pie and only a fragment remains. His friend meant to get the story again when he went through Gadyach, where the man lives, but he forgot and only remembered six miles (10 km) past the village.

== Plot ==
In the story, Ivan Shponka is a young man who is not very bright but attends to his affairs better than anyone. He was made as the monitor in his class when young though there were some much better than he, and won the affection of one of the most feared teachers at school. He finally finishes the second class (sixth grade approximately) at fifteen, and goes on to the military after two more years of school, retiring as a lieutenant.

He gets a letter from his aunt that he needs to come home to become master of his farm and sets off for Gadyach. On the way, at an inn, he meets the fat landowner Grigory Grigoriviech, who says he lives near Ivan's farm and asks him to come visit when he gets there. The man is pushy and frequently orders around his Cossack servant boy. When Ivan arrives there he finds his aunt in incredible health, almost so man-like that she is hardly a woman. He begins to take over some of the duties of the farm.

Gogol's descriptions of the scenery here are very rich and beautiful and the mowing segment seems to have likely influenced Tolstoy while writing Anna Karenina (also including a mowing scene with Levin that is strikingly similar). Ivan learns from his aunt that 60 acres (240,000 m^{2}) nearby are rightfully his, being held by Grigory. He goes to visit him but the man denies the existence of a will written by his father detailing the matter, so they have dinner and Ivan meets his daughters. When he tells his aunt of the one daughter, she becomes obsessed about him marrying her and his chores begin to decline somewhat.

They visit there together but Ivan says little to her when alone other than mentioning the house flies during the time of year. When he goes home, that night, he has a terrible nightmare about marriage and Gogol gives the reader some truly modern scenes that display his ability to portray the grotesque. A shopkeeper, for example, is selling "wives" as fabric and cuts one off for Ivan to wear. The story ends here mentioning a "next chapter" that does not exist.

== Adaptations ==
In April 2002, the BBC Radio 4 comedy series Three Ivans, Two Aunts and an Overcoat broadcast an adaptation of the story starring Griff Rhys Jones as Ivan. This version ends with Ivan fleeing back to Siberia and trying to re-enlist, only to be turned down by his former commanding officer and having to face the horrible possibility of going back to his aunt and possible wife-to-be.

The Mariinsky Theatre commissioned Anastasiya Bespalova in 2009 to compose the opera Shponka and His Aunt.
