= Arabesques (short story collection) =

1835 book by Nikolai Gogol

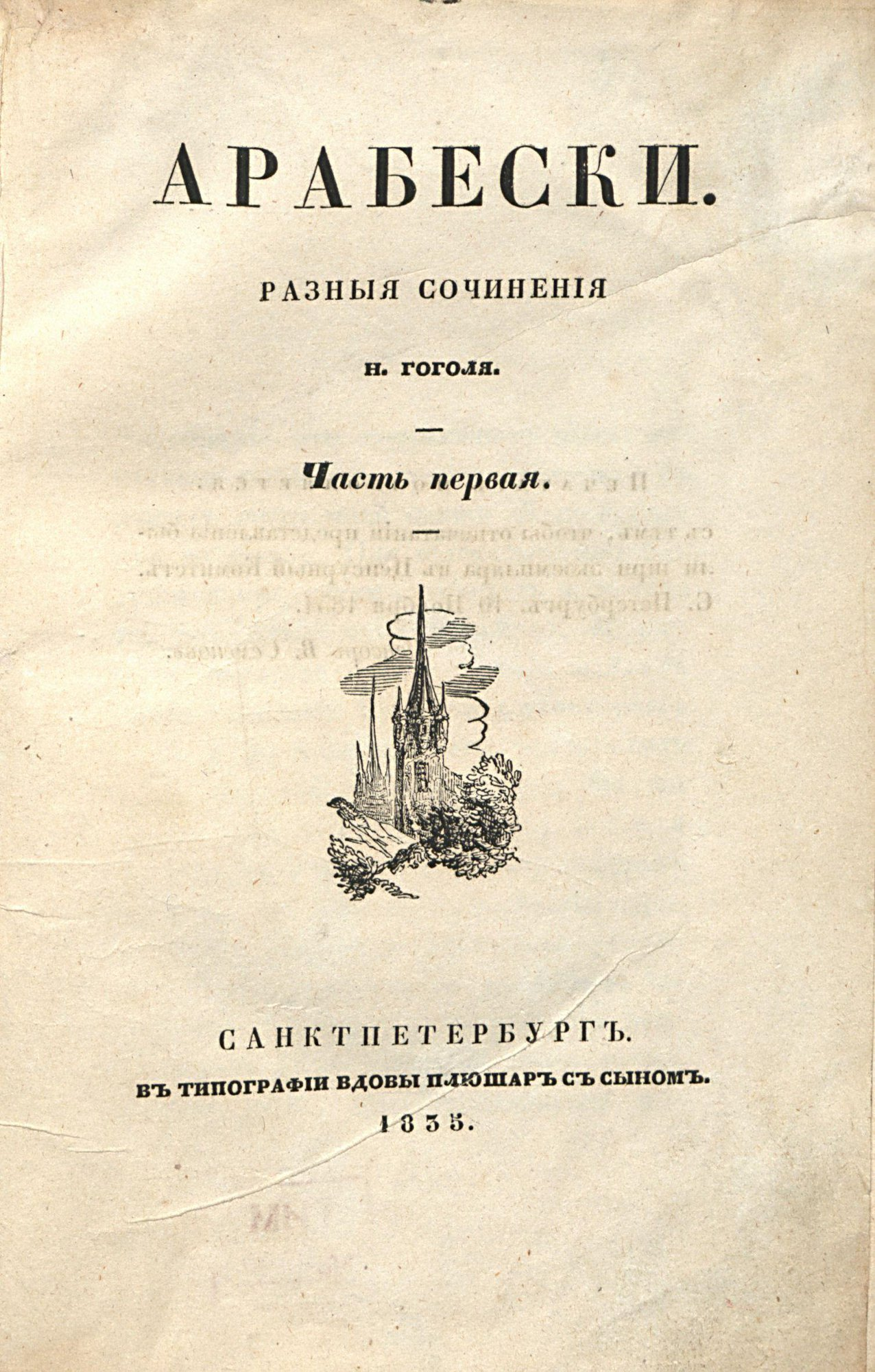
- Author: Nikolai Gogol
- Original title: Арабески
- Language: Russian
- Genre: articles and fiction
- Publication date: 1835

Arabesques (Russian: «Арабески») are collected works written and compiled by Nikolai Gogol, first published in January 1835. The collection consists of two parts, diverse in content, hence its name: ″arabesques,″ a special type of Arabic design where lines wind around each other. Articles on chronicles, geography, and art, as well as works of fiction such as "Nevsky Prospekt," "The Portrait," and "Diary of a Madman" merge the collection into one piece.

The articles represent Gogol's opinions and ideas about literature and art. In "A Few Words About Pushkin," for instance, he describes Pushkin as one of the greatest Russian poets and sets task for Russian literature to be fulfilled; in "On Little Russian Songs," Gogol gave his estimation of Ukrainian folk arts; and in an article about Karl Bryullov's painting The Last Day of Pompeii he assessed the phenomenon of Russian art.
