= The Lost Letter: A Tale Told by the Sexton of the N...Church =

Short story by Nikolai Gogol

"The Lost Letter" (1831) is a short story included in the Nikolai Gogol's 1832 collection Evenings on a Farm Near Dikanka.

The story is told by an exuberant narrator, the old sexton Foma, who will return with another story, "A Bewitched Place", in the next volume.

An animated film adaptation of the same name was released in 1945. A live film version, The Lost Letter by director Borys Ivchenko, was released in 1972.

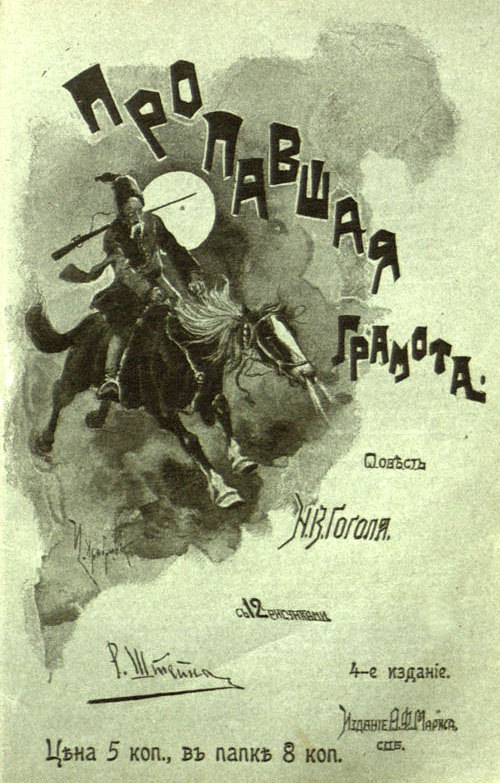
The lost letter

== Plot ==
The sexton humorously recounts the story about his grandfather's adventure in Hell. Once, when his grandfather was given the task of delivering a letter to the Czarina (apparently Empress Elizabeth), he came upon a fair in Konotop where he met a Zaporozhian Cossack. They quickly become friends and drink to each other's health. During their carousal, the Cossack reveals that he sold his soul to the devil and if he was any sort of true friend, he’d promise to stay up and watch over him during the current night in order for him to remain safe.

The grandfather and his friends agree, riding on to a tavern. When they sit down to rest, the other Cossacks fall asleep, leaving the grandfather to keep watch alone. He starts to see things moving under a cart, but ends up falling asleep anyway, awakening to the fact that the Cossack, and the hat he traded to him, are missing. He had sewn the letter to the Czarina in the hat and is anxious to get it back. In addition, his horse is missing as well, and he reasons that the devil, it being such a long walk back to hell, stole his horse to make it a quicker journey.

The grandfather asks everyone for help, and eventually the tavern keeper gives him instructions on how to find what he seeks by taking a strange trip through the forest off the road. He follows the tavern keeper’s instructions, going through brambles and thorns, and comes across a huge field with the stream he was supposed to find in the middle of it, seeing a light moving. He moves towards it, and finds a small group of "pig-faced men" (devils) sitting around it. They do not respond, instead they focus on throwing something into the fire. The grandfather decides to sit down since they don’t seem to respond to him, and asks them for a light for his pipe. One shoves a burning stick in his face, nearly poking his eye out, and he then tells them his story so they will help him. They don’t respond, and merely stick out their empty palms, so the grandfather throws the money he brought with him to the ground.

A huge turmoil ensues, and suddenly he finds himself amongst a large gathering of strange creatures with dog-faces, pig-faces and the like, including several witches, one of whom is the most beautiful and he reasons is the leader. She says he can have his hat back if he wins one of three games of "fool". As he plays, he finds the deck seems to be loaded, as every hand he pulls out, regardless of how good it is, becomes worthless when he throws it on the table. In a rage, and forgetting his fear, he slams his fist on the table, startling the group, and makes the sign of the cross under the cards so they can't see him, and they suddenly become playable again. The grandfather begins to throw out one trump card after the other, and the witches fly into a rage.

Suddenly, the hat flies into his face, but he demands his horse back as well. The group of witches complies and a pile of bones appears, but he still demands to be taken away from them, so they give him a demonic horse that takes him home jumping over huge ravines and areas he will never describe to anyone. He gets to give the letter to the Czarina and the only thing that remains following his ordeal is the fact that once a year, on the date he met the group of demons, his wife has an uncontrollable urge to dance and does, with no way of stopping her.

== See also ==
- Propala Hramota, Soviet-era Ukrainian film based on Gogol's story
