= Edyta Bojanowska =

American slavicist

- Awards: Guggenheim Fellowship (2020)

Academic background
- Education: Barnard College (BA); Harvard University (PhD)

Academic work
- Discipline: Russian literature
- Institutions: Rutgers University; Yale University

Edyta M. Bojanowska is an American literary scholar and slavicist. She is a professor of Slavic languages and literature at Yale University and is currently the chair of Yale's Department of Slavic Languages and Literatures.

== Biography ==
Bojanowska received a B.A. from Barnard College and a Ph.D. from Harvard University. She was a Junior Fellow at the Harvard Society of Fellows and spent a year at the Institute for Advanced Study on a Frederick Burkhardt Fellowship funded by the American Council of Learned Societies. She taught at Rutgers University before joining the Yale faculty.

Bojanowska's specialization is on empire and nationalism in nineteenth-century Russian literature and intellectual history. Her book, A World of Empires: The Russian Voyage of the Frigate Pallada (2018), which recounts the nineteenth-century voyage of a Russian frigate based on explorer Ivan Goncharov’s travelogue, received an honorable mention for the Heldt Prize from the Association of Women in Slavic Studies. She also deconstructed the russocentric myth of Nikolai Gogol, a Ukrainian-born Russophone writer in the book Nikolai Gogol: Between Ukrainian and Russian Nationalism (2007), which received the Scaglione Prize for the best Book in Slavic Studies from the Modern Language Association.

She received a Guggenheim Fellowship in 2020 to explore the imperial themes in the works of major nineteenth-century Russian writers.
