= A Terrible Vengeance =

- Short story by Nikolai Gogol
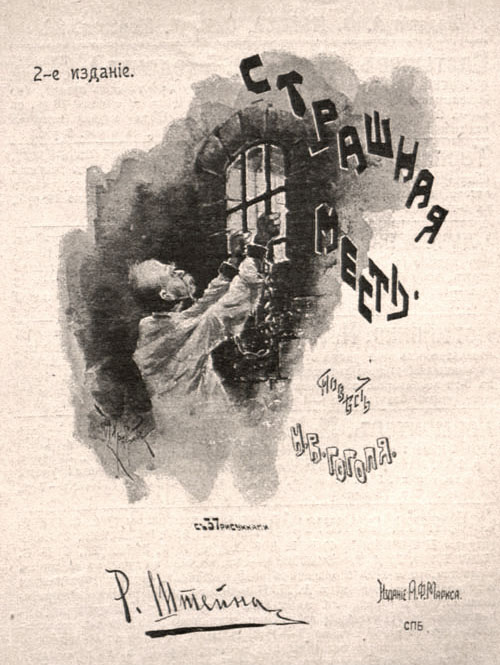
- 1901 book cover
- Original title: Страшная месть
- Translator: Richard Pevear
- Country: Russia
- Language: Russian
- Genre: Gothic fiction

Publication
- Published in: Evenings on a Farm Near Dikanka
- Publication type: Anthology
- Publication date: 1832
- Published in English: 1998

"A Terrible Vengeance" (Russian: Страшная месть, romanized: Strashnaya mest') is a short Gothic horror story written by Nikolai Gogol. It was published in the second volume of his first short story collection, Evenings on a Farm Near Dikanka, in 1832, and it was probably written in late summer 1831.

== Origin ==
The appearance of evil spirits, and specifically of an Antichrist figure, in "A Terrible Vengeance" was typical of Gogol's belief in the omnipresence of Evil in everyday life, an aspect of his religious philosophy that is uniquely direct in this story. The overall construction of the story is typical of what would come to be called skaz, wherein characters are identified to a large degree by linguistic specificities of their manner of speech. Another particularity of the piece is frequent narratorial intrusion, such as asides to the reader or other violations of the narratorial frame.

The basic plot of the story evokes folklore, but there is no comparable piece in Ukrainian or Russian traditions. A similar story of a sorcerer appeared in "Pietro Apone" by German romantic Johann Ludwig Tieck, published in Russian in 1828. Other potential subtexts are Tieck's Karl von Berneck (1797) and E. T. A. Hoffmann's novella Ignaz Denner (1816).

== Plot ==
Danilo and Katerina attend the wedding of the Cossack yesaul Gorobets's son in a neighborhood of Kiev. During the celebration, the yesaul brings out two holy icons, at the sight of which a stranger transforms into a sorcerer and disappears. As soon as Katerina's father arrives at her and Danilo's home the next morning, he demands that she explain her late return the previous night. In the ensuing fight, Katerina's father shoots Danilo in the arm before she intervenes and begs them to forgive one another.

Katerina tells Danilo she had a dream the previous night about a sorcerer who wants to marry her. Danilo discovers that the sorcerer is her own father and realizes he is the Antichrist. The Cossacks capture her father and chain him in the cellar of Danilo and Katerina's house, but he convinces Katerina to release him.

A group of Poles, organized by the sorcerer, come to take Danilo's land, but they are struck down one by one by him and his fellow Cossacks. At the end of the battle, the sorcerer shoots Danilo dead from behind a tree. Katerina has a dream about her son being killed, wakes up from the nightmare, and finds the baby dead in its cradle.

Katerina turns mad until a traveler stops at her house one day and appears to bring her back to sanity. But when he claims that Danilo once told him to marry her should Danilo die, Katerina recognizes him as the sorcerer and tries to stab him, but he gets hold of the knife, kills her and flees on horseback.

A miracle happens: both the Crimea and the Carpathians become visible from Kyiv. As clouds clear off towering Mount Kriváň, the sorcerer sees a hulking knight with a boy on a horse riding down its slopes. He pleads with a starets at the Kiev Monastery of the Caves to help him, but they will not, for the sorcerer is already damned, so the sorcerer kills the starets. The knight catches up with the sorcerer and casts him into an abyss where corpses of his ancestors await to eternally gnaw on his body.

In the epilogue, a blind kobzar sings of two knights in service of king Stephen Báthory, Ivan and Petro. Petro betrays his friend and throws him and his baby son off a cliff. Ivan asks God for a revenge: to make one of Petro's descendant such a villain that all his ancestors would suffer in Hell, and let Ivan's spirit to eventually throw him into abyss. God grants this "terrible vengeance", but for Ivan's vengefulness his spirit is doomed to forever haunt the mountains.

== Film ==
A 20-minute animated adaptation of the story was made at Kievnauchfilm studio in 1988 (with the same title). The film keeps the original dark tone, albeit breaks narrative even more in favor of surreal elements. It was directed by Mikhail Titov.

== See also ==
- Gogol. Terrible Revenge
