= Nevsky Prospekt (story) =

1835 short story by Nikolai Gogol

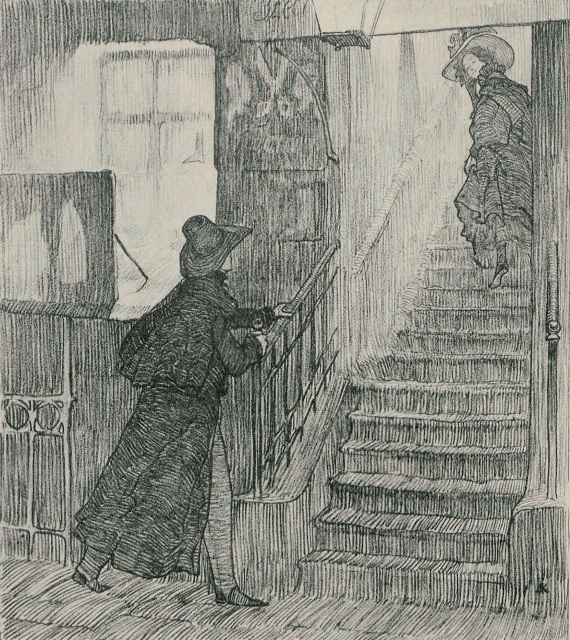
Dmitry Kardovsky's illustration for the 1904 edition.

"Nevsky Prospekt" (Russian: Невский Проспект) is a short story by Nikolai Gogol, written between 1831 and 1834 and published in the collection Arabesques in 1835.

== Summary ==
Influenced strongly by the sentimental movement, the protagonist of "Nevsky Prospekt" is a pathetic and insignificant romantic, the narrator is chatty and unreliable (along the lines of Tristram Shandy, the definitive sentimental novel), and realism dominates. The story is organized symmetrically; the narrator describes Nevsky Prospekt in great detail, then the plot splits to follow in turn two acquaintances, each of whom follows a beautiful woman whom he has seen on the street. The first story follows the romantic hero, the second follows his realistic foil. The story closes with the narrator once more speaking generally of Nevsky Prospekt.

The introduction describes Nevsky Prospekt, the central avenue of St. Petersburg, and its population at different times of the day. The narrator revels in the delights of the street, but he is filled with Poshlost, (defined by literary historian D. S. Mirsky as "'self-satisfied inferiority,' moral and spiritual.") This is exemplified in the repeated admiring descriptions of mustaches, "to which the better part of a life has been devoted." The description of the street ends abruptly, and the story shifts to the conversation of two acquaintances who have decided to split up to each pursue a different woman seen on the street.

The first story told is of a young, romantic painter, Piskarev, who follows a dark-haired woman (whom he likens to Perugino's Bianca (Note: Endnote 19 in Richard Peace: The Enigma of Gogol (Cambridge 2009) cites K. D. Muratova's identification of the painting as Adoration of the Magi (Perugino, Città della Pieve), as well as Mashkovtsev's opinion that some other painting must have been meant.)) to what turns out to be a brothel. However, his interest in the woman is completely innocent and chaste, so he is shocked by her true nature and flees. Back in his room, Piskarev dreams of her as a woman of wealth and virtue. Living only for his dreams, he develops insomnia and turns to opium to restore his ability to sleep and to dream. After dreaming of the woman as his wife, he decides to marry her, but when he returns to the brothel to propose the woman mocks him. Piskarev returns to his lodging and cuts his throat. His funeral is unattended.

The second story is of an officer, Lieutenant Pirogov. Crude and realistic, he is the romantic Piskarev's foil. Pirogov follows a blonde woman to her home, but she turns out to be the wife of a German tinsmith. Returning when the husband is out, Pirogov attempts to seduce the woman, but he is caught with the woman in his arms and is flogged. Pirogov is at first furious and determined to seek revenge, but he is mollified by eating puff pastries, reading a reactionary newspaper and spending an evening dancing.

The story concludes with the narrator's warning that "Nevsky Prospekt deceives at all hours of the day, but the worst time of all is at night... when the devil himself is abroad, kindling the street-lamps with one purpose only: to show everything in a false light."

The story forms an allegory that traces the interplay of form drive (Formtrieb), material drive (Stofftrieb) and beautiful appearance (schöner Schein) conceived by Friedrich Schiller back to the commodity form (Warenförmigkeit) which is problematized by Karl Marx and which Gogolʹs art makes comprehensible.

== In popular culture ==
- The fourth season of "Infinity Train" was inspired by Nevsky Prospekt. Particularly, the main characters, Ryan Akagi and Min-Gi Park, were based on romantic Piskarev and realist Pirogov. In the first episode of the season, the short story is even referenced when Min suggests "Nevsky and the Prospekts" as a band name for them.
