= Evenings on a Farm Near Dikanka =

1832 Russian-language short story collection by Nikolai Gogol

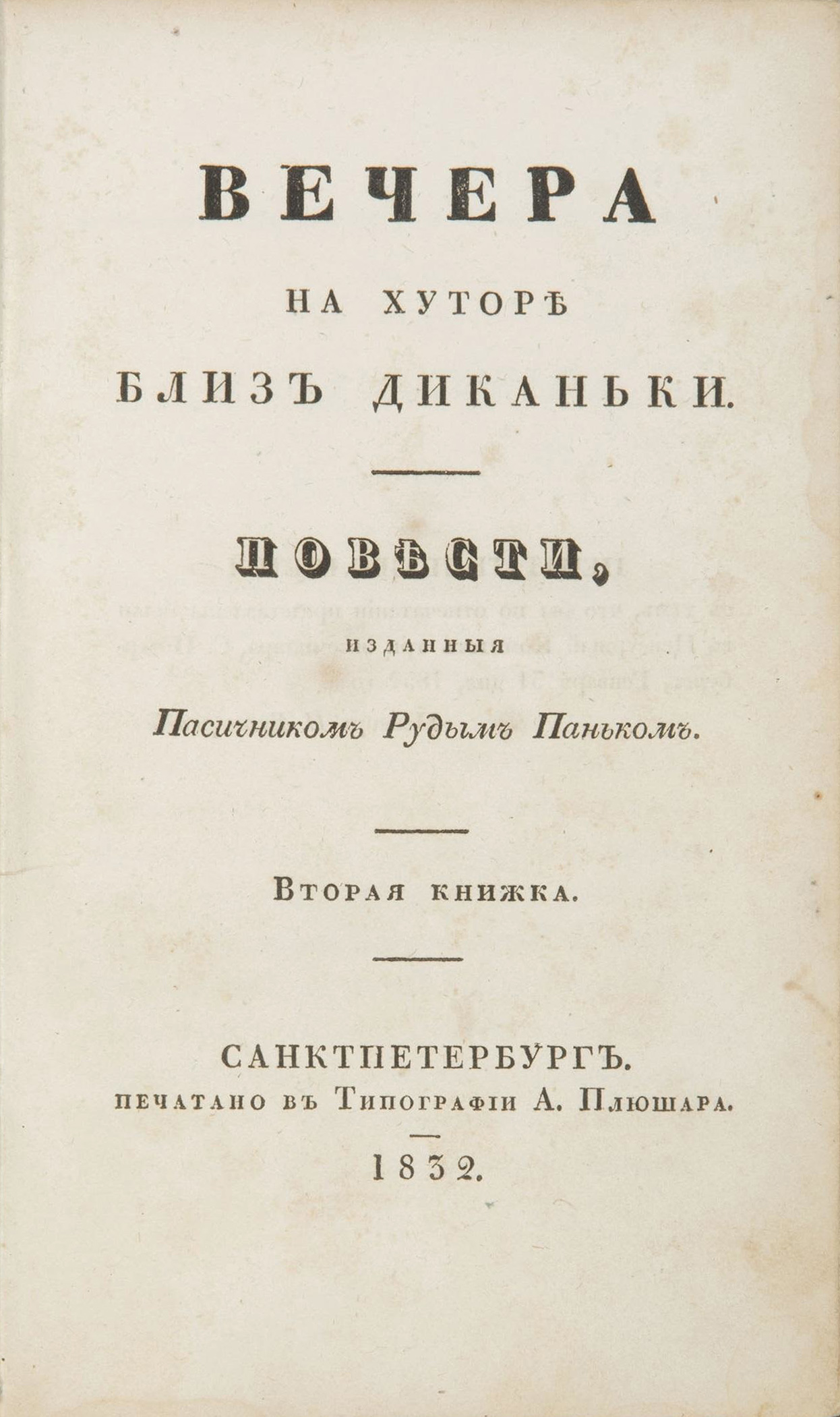
Evening on a farm near Dikanka- collections of short stories

Evenings on a Farm Near Dikanka (Russian: «Вечера на хуторе близ Диканьки») is a collection of short stories by Nikolai Gogol, written in 1829–1832. They appeared in various magazines and were published in book form when Gogol was twenty-two. The collection's frame story takes place in Dykanka, a settlement in central Ukraine.

The writer was born in the village of Velyki Sorochyntsi near Poltava, and spent his life in Ukraine up to the age of nineteen. He put his early impressions and memories of childhood into these pictures of peasant life. In a series of letters to his mother, he asked her to write down descriptions of village customs, dress, superstitions, and old stories. These were also used as primary sources.

== Stories ==
Evenings on a Farm Near Dikanka is separated into two volumes of four stories each:

Часть первая [Chast' pervaya], Part One

1. Сорочинская ярмарка [Sorochinskaya yarmarka], Sorochyntsi Fair
2. Вечер накануне Ивана Купала [Vecher nakanune Ivana Kupala], St. John's Eve
3. Майская ночь, или Утопленница [Mayskaya noch', ili Utoplenitsa], May Night, or The Drowned Maiden
4. Пропавшая грамота [Propavshaya gramota], The Lost Letter

Часть вторая [Chast' vtoraya], Part Two

1. Ночь перед Рождеством [Noch' pyered Rozhdestvom], Christmas Eve
2. Страшная месть [Strashnaya myest'], A Terrible Vengeance
3. Иван Фёдорович Шпонька и его тётушка [Ivan Fyodorovich Shpon'ka i yevo tyotushka], Ivan Fyodorovich Shponka and His Aunt
4. Заколдованное место [Zakoldovannoye myesto], A Bewitched Place

== Significance ==
This was Gogol's groundbreaking work, though not his first, and formed the core of his style, especially his sense of the macabre. It was this collection that proved he was a new power in Russian literature with unique innovation and a carefully arranged mingling of the horrifying and the humorous. Alexander Pushkin had a heavy influence on the writing of the collection, which features references to Ukraine, where Gogol spent the early years of his life. The stories are heavily laced with Ukrainian folklore and cultural references, offering a unique perspective into life in the country during Gogol's time. The structure found in this collection became characteristic of Gogol's writing later on, found in works such as Dead Souls. "Evenings" gained Gogol the fame that would lead him to a prominent placement in the Russian literary circle, as well as opening the doors for future works.

== Preface ==
The preface is the opening to the first volume of Evenings on a Farm Near Dikanka by Nikolai Gogol, written in 1831.

Each of the segments is based on Ukrainian folklore and features comedic elements and a binding narrator, beekeeper Pan'ko-the-Redhaired, who is dictating the stories to the reader. A few other characters are mentioned in terms of the stories they provide, but regardless these segments are still told through the beekeeper Rudy Panko.

This short section introduces the beekeeper Panko, who begins to introduce his task of informing the reader of a set of wondrous tales he has heard. He speaks very matter-of-factly and personally to the reader, as though they were sitting in front of him at his dinner table or outside in his village. He talks about the pleasant serenity of peasant life and mentions lavish parties. He continues about the storytelling at these nightly parties and then comments that no one can tell stories like Rudy Panko. His name means “red haired” both in Ukrainian, it is a nickname, again making it seem informal and personal since the narrator is using a personal name. He eventually gets caught up in talking about mundane events, and stops himself so he can get on with his storytelling. The main stories begin after this section.

== Adaptations ==
Evenings on a Farm Near Dikanka or any of its stories have been adapted into film several times. Among these are:

- The Night Before Christmas (1913) early Russian silent film, based on the eponymous story.
- The Lost Letter (1945) - Soviet animation film based on the eponymous story.
- The Night Before Christmas (1961), Russian Soviet film based on the eponymous story.
- The Lost Letter (1972), legendary Ukrainian Soviet film based on the eponymous story.
- Evenings on a Farm Near Dikanka (2001) - Russian-Ukrainian TV musical fantasy comedy. Based on the story The Night Before Christmas / Christmas Eve, and a remake of the 1913 Russian silent film of the same name.
- Gogol (film series) - series of Russian fantasy-horror films loosely based on some of the stories, namely:
  - Gogol. The Beginning (2017)
  - Gogol. A Terrible Revenge (2018)
