= May Night, or the Drowned Maiden =

"May Night, or the Drowned Maiden" (Russian: «Майская ночь, или Утопленница», romanized: Mayskaya noch', ili Utoplennitsa, 1831) is the third tale in the collection of short stories Evenings on a Farm Near Dikanka by Nikolai Gogol. It was made into the opera May Night by Nikolai Rimsky-Korsakov in 1878–79 and also a Ukrainian setting by Mykola Lysenko.

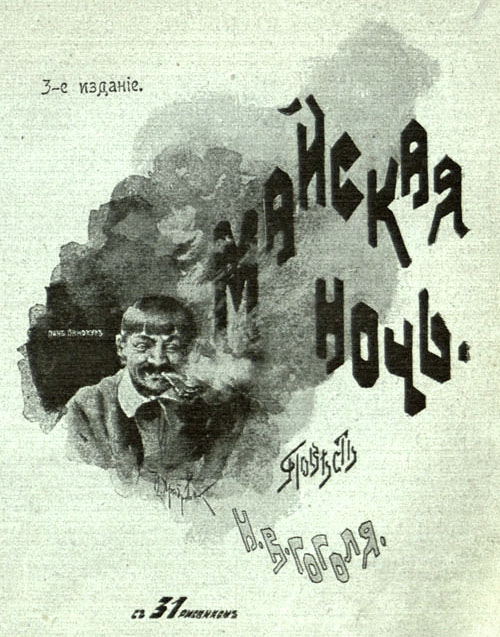
May Night, or the Drowned Maiden

== Synopsis ==
This story comes from the unnamed story-teller (who was previously responsible for "The Fair at Sorochyntsi").

In this tale, a young Cossack named Levko, the son of the mayor, is in love with Hanna. He comes to her house to talk about marriage and mentions that his father is not pleased with the idea, though he doesn't say anything directly and merely ignores him. As they are walking on the outskirts of the village, Hanna asks about an old hut with a moss-covered roof and overgrown apple trees surrounding it. He tells her the story of a beautiful young girl whose father took care of her after her mother died and loved her dearly. Eventually, he married another woman who she discovered was a witch when she cut the paw of a cat that tried to kill her and her stepmother appeared soon after with her hand bandaged. The witch had power over her father, however, and eventually she is thrown out of the house and throws herself into the nearby pond in despair. She reigns over a group of maidens who also drowned in the pond, but once, when she got a hold of the witch as she was near the pond, she turned into a maiden and the ghost of the young girl has been unable to pick her out of the group ever since, asking any young man she comes upon to guess for her.

As the story progresses Rudy mentions the mayor and a drunk walks into his house thinking it is his, tricked by local peasants. Then, his son, who is angry at his father for trying to steal Hanna away, and his friends decide to play tricks on the village and start to parade around causing havoc. They dress up the mayor's sister-in-law, who is assumed to be having an affair with him, as a demon with soot all over her face, tricking the mayor. He mistakenly throws her into the cellar and then finds out it's her, but she gets angry and goes outside, to be captured by the boys again and thrown into a hut. Meanwhile, the mayor and some of his closest friends decide to find the hooligans and instead find the sister-in-law again and almost burn her alive in the hut.

Levko goes on his own and falls asleep near the old house and the pond. He becomes enchanted by the calm night and silvery mist surrounding everything, and then notices in the pond's reflection that the hut appears to be occupied, and a young girl with beautiful skin pops her head out of the window. When he turns to look at the hut, it looks as empty as ever, but when he comes up to the window the maiden comes out and asks him to guess which maiden the witch is in the group. As he looks at them, he notices one at first that doesn't seem interested in playing games, but determines her to be normal. One, however, seems to revel in playing the part of a hawk in their game, and he sees blackness in her form, realising she is the witch. The maiden is grateful and gives him a note to help him with his father. He wakes up and is soon captured by his father and his minions, but still has the letter, which he gives to the mayor. The letter seems to be from the local commissar, who requests the mayor clean up his village (asking several things to be done) as well as allowing his son to marry Hanna. The mayor agrees and they will be married in the near future.
