= A Bewitched Place =

1832 short story by Nikolai Gogol

"A Bewitched Place" is the last story in the second volume of Nikolai Gogol's first collection of short stories, Evenings on a Farm Near Dikanka (1832).

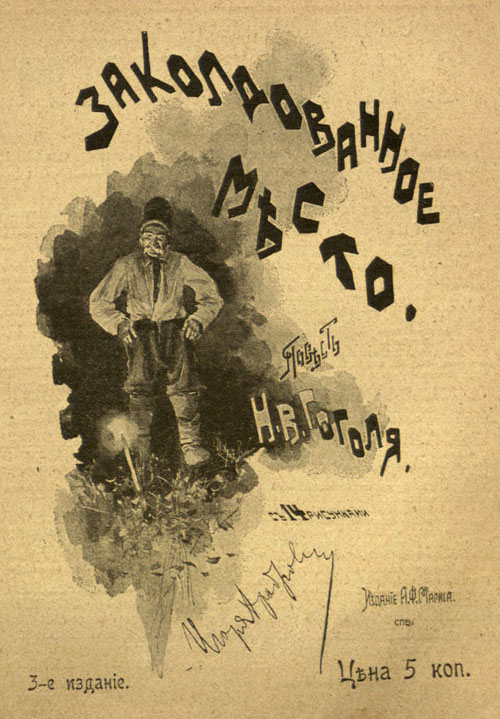
A Bewitched Place

Like the concluding tale of the first volume, "The Lost Letter: A Tale Told by the Sexton of the N...Church", it is told by an exuberant Cossack narrator, the old sexton Foma, who says that the tale is about his grandfather.

== Plot ==
Foma's grandfather takes care of melons and spends most of his time at a shanty nearby, taking pleasure in groups of wagons that come by with various items. One day, while discussing matters with some passing wagoneers, his grandfather decides to outdo Foma and his friend at dancing. He does quite well until he reaches a spot in the garden where he cannot seem to move and his legs stiffen up. He curses the devil, and tries his luck again.

Suddenly he is transported to a different area that seems to be the local priest's garden. He comes up to a gravestone that is shimmering, and marks it with a stick believing there to be treasure below somewhere. When he comes home he won't discuss what happened and ventures out the next day to find the spot. When he gets to the priest's garden, he cannot spot the gravestone above the buried treasure and he curses the devil again for tricking him.

The next day, Foma's grandfather explores the place where he could not dance the day before and finds that this spot is capable of magically transporting him to the cemetery where the grave is marked. He digs and finds a cauldron, while being mocked by a bird, a sheep and a bear, that, in a horrifying manner, repeat what he says. After he finds the treasure, the devil tries to terrify him again by making it appear as though he was below a precipice ready to come down on him with a monstrous head peeping from behind it. The grandfather throws down the cauldron, and everything becomes as before. Deciding that the devil is only trying to scare him, he grabs the cauldron and starts running back to his home.

His wife watches the approaching cauldron. Thinking the boys are behind it as it comes towards her, she throws dirty dishwater behind it, covering the grandfather with melon waste. He tells them what he found but when he opens the cauldron he finds filth and from that day forward never trusts the devil again and crosses himself whenever he comes to a spot said to have something wrong with it. He fences off the area where he couldn't dance and has everyone throw all the garbage and weeds they collect on the spot.
