= The Lost Letter (1945 film) =

1945 animated film

- Directed by: Lamis Bredis; Zinaida Brumberg; Valentina Brumberg
- Written by: Nikolai Gogol (story); Zinoviy Kalik
- Produced by: Soyuzmultfilm
- Starring: Mikhail Yanshin; Boris Livanov; Sergey Martinson; Leonid Pirogov
- Narrated by: Vasily Kachalov
- Music by: Serafim Vasilenko
- Release date: January 1, 1945
- Running time: 43 minutes
- Country: Soviet Union
- Language: Russian

The Lost Letter (Russian: Пропа́вшая гра́мота, Propavshaya gramota), or A Disappeared Diploma, is a 1945 Soviet animated film directed by the "grandmothers of the Russian animation", Brumberg sisters, and Lamis Bredis. It is the first Soviet traditionally-animated feature film. It was produced at the Soyuzmultfilm studio in Moscow and is based on the 1832 story with the same name by Nikolai Gogol. The creators of the film managed to convey national Ukrainian color and to recreate the magical, fantastic atmosphere peculiar to works of the writer. Also, for a more realistic style of dance in the Zaporozhets and the Cossack, Igor Moiseyev was involved.

== Plot ==
On a hot August day, a messenger sends the Cossack to the capital with the diploma, meant for the queen, tucked away under his hat. On the road he strikes up an acquaintanceship with a loose Zaporozhet. During a break in their journey, the new friend told the Cossack that he sold his soul to a devil and waits for payment. At night the Cossack didn't go to bed, deciding to take the role of lookout. As the night darkened, the place they rested grew progressively as the devil came, took away the cossack's horse, and the queen's diploma with her. It was necessary to look for to the devil in order to retrieve the Cossack's items, but the devil was lost in the wood, Furthermore, it became clear that these woods were overflowing with evil spirits. Soon the Cossack found himself in the presence of many minor devil spirits and the evil witch-like entity who was controlling them. He challenged her to a card game in order to get his horse and the queen's diploma back. Despite the queen's cheating, he caught her and beat her, winning in the end, being able to leave with all of his things. In the morning the Cossack said goodbye to the acquaintance and, without further stops, rushed off to St. Petersburg.

== Creators ==
	English	Russian
Directors	Lamis Bredis; Zinaida Brumberg; Valentina Brumberg	Ламис Бредис; Зинаида Брумберг; Валентина Брумберг
Directors' assistants	K. Apestina; Ye. Novosel'skaya; Ye. Golovanova; T. Fyodorova; I. Kul'neva; Ye. Shilova	К. Апестина; Вы. Новосельская; Вы. Голованова; Т. Федорова; И. Кульнева; Вы. Шилова
Scenario	Zinoviy Kalik; Zinaida Brumberg; Valentina Brumberg	Зиновий Калик; Зинаида Брумберг; Валентина Брумберг
Art Directors	Yevgeniy Migunov; Anatoliy Sazonov	Евгений Мигунов; Анатолий Сазонов
Decorative artists	B. Suteyeva; G. Nevzorova; V. Valeryanova; I. Troyanova; O. Gemmerling; V. Rodzhero	Б. Сутеева; Г. Невзорова; В. Валерйанова; И. Троянова; О. Геммерлинг; В. Роджеро
Animators	Pyotr Repkin; Y. Popov; Aleksandr Belyakov; Tatyana Fyodorova; Boris Dyozhkin; Nina Mindovskaya; Nadezhda Privalova; Tatyana Basmanova; Gennadiy Filippov; Lamis Bredis; N. Fyodorova; Roman Davydov; Faina Yepifanova	Пётр Репкин; Ю. Попов; Александр Беляков; Татьяна Фёдорова; Борис Дёжкин; Нина Миндовская; Надежда Привалова; Татьяна Басманова; Геннадий Филиппов; Ламис Бредис; Н. Фёдорова; Роман Давыдов; Фаина Епифанова
Camera Operators	Nikolai Voinov; Yelena Petrova	Николай Воинов; Елена Петрова
Composer	Serafim Vasilenko	Серафим Василенко
Sound Operator	Nikolay Prilutskiy	Николай Прилуцкий
Sound Engineer	Valeriy Popov	Валерий Попов
Artistic Administrator	Aleksandr Ptushko	Александр Птушко
Voice Actors	Mikhail Yanshin; Boris Livanov Sergey Martinson; Leonid Pirogov	Михаил Яншин; Борис Ливанов Сергей Мартинсон; Леонид Пирогов
Narrator	Vasiliy Kachalov	Василий Качалов

== Video ==
In the mid-nineties, Studio PRO Video (together with the best Soviet animated films) and the Soyuz studio let out videotapes with this animated film.

In the 2000s, the animated film is released on DVD by Soyuz studio.

== See also ==
- The Lost Letter (1972)
- The Lost Letter: A Tale Told by the Sexton of the N...Church
- History of Russian animation
- Lists of animated films
- The Humpbacked Horse (1947) – the second cel-animated Soviet feature film
