= Vyacheslav Kruglik =

Russian composer and conductor

Vyacheslav Kruglik (in Russian: Вячеслав Круглик) is a Russian composer and conductor. He is a member of the orchestral conducting faculty at the Saint Petersburg State University of Culture and Arts.

== Biography ==
Vyacheslav Kruglik was born in Saint Petersburg. He graduated from the St. Petersburg Rimsky-Korsakov Music College. In 1996-2004 he studied at the Saint Petersburg Conservatory.

Kruglik's one act opera The Carriage was one of three new operas selected by the Mariinsky Theatre for performance in the summer 2009 festival, receiving its premiere at the opera house on 21 June of that year.

== Works ==
- One-act opera "The Carriage" based on a plot by Gogol
- Ballet "The Magic Ring" (co-written with Svetlana Nesterova)
- Symphony for a Large Symphony Orchestra (2000)
- Suite for orchestra "A Time to Live and a Time to Die" (2010)
- Overture "Princess Olga" (2012)
- Opera "The Speculator" based on Zoshchenko's short story "No Need to speculate" (2013)

Compositions for wind instruments: two pieces for trombone and piano (1993), piece for flute and Piano (1993), Sonata for Trombone and Piano (1994), Piece for Flute, Trombone and Vibraphone (1994), "For Three Flutes" (1995), Trio for Trombones (1997), Fantasy for Clarinet and Chamber Orchestra (1998), Sonata for Flute and Piano (2002), Sonata for Clarinet and Piano (2011), Concerto for Trombone and Orchestra (2012).
