= Anastasiya Bespalova =

Russian composer

Anastasiya Bespalova (Russian: Анастаси́я Беспа́лова) is a Russian composer.

== Biography ==
Bespalova is a graduate of the Urals Mussorgsky State Conservatoire where she studied music composition under Vladimir Kobekin. In 2003 she won the First Opus young composers competition in Moscow. She later won the Mariinsky Theatre's young composers competition for an opera based on a subject by Nikolai Gogol with her one-act work Shponka and His Aunt. The opera premiered at the Mariinsky Theatre on 21 June 2009.

Bespalova's works have also been performed at several music festivals including the New Music Days Festival in Yekaterinburg. Several of her works have been performed in concert at the Youth Academies of Russia, including the symphonic work Secrets of a Wild Wood, the string quartet A Clockwork Orange, and her choral work with saxophone and piano, A Hymn to the Sun.
