= Svetlana Nesterova =

Russian composer

Svetlana Nesterova is a Russian composer and violinist. Since 2002 she has served on the musical instrument faculty at the Saint Petersburg Conservatory.

== Biography ==
Born in Yekaterinburg, Nesterova studied music composition at the Saint Petersburg Conservatory under Boris Tishchenko from 1995 to 2000. She continued on at the Conservatory to pursue further post-graduate studies which she completed in 2002. During this time she performed as part of a student delegation in concerts in Moscow and Boston, Massachusetts. She also served as the concertmaster at the Russian Academy of Theatre Arts.

In 1999 Nesterova was awarded the grant Muses of Petersburg in the music category. In 2005 she was a prize-winner of the Mariinsky Theatre's Russian opera composition competition with her one act opera The Lawsuit. The work was one of three new operas selected by the Mariinsky Theatre for performance in the summer 2009 festival, receiving its premiere at the opera house on 21 June of that year. She was awarded first prize at the All-Russian Andrei Petrov Competition for her violin fantasy In the World of High Technology in 2007. Her children's opera, Semyon. Version 1.0 (composed with Vyacheslav Kruglik), was a prize-winner at the 2008 composition competition at the Bolshoi Theatre.

Nesterova's compositions have also been performed at the Košice Music Spring Festival, the Sound Routes Festival, and the festival 'From the Avant-garde to the Present Day'. Her other works include an operetta, The Sinyushkin Shaft, the children's musical tale About How the Letters Sang and Children Learned to Read, several concerti for various instrumental ensembles, and a number of piano sonatas and vocal song cycles. As a violinist she has performed the premieres of several musical pieces by contemporary Russian composers in concerts in St Petersburg, Moscow, Yekaterinburg, Kaliningrad and Vitebsk.

== Sources ==
- Biography of Svetlana Nesterova at the Mariinsky Theatre
