= Noch' pered rozhdestvom =

Noch' pered rozhdestvom (Russian: Ночь пе́ред Рождество́м, literally "Night Before Christmas") can refer to:

- "Christmas Eve" (Gogol), short story by Nikolai Gogol
- Christmas Eve (opera) (1894-95) by Rimsky-Korsakov
- The Night Before Christmas (1913 film)
- The Night Before Christmas (1951 film)

== See also ==
- The Night Before Christmas (disambiguation)
