= The Night Before Christmas (disambiguation) =

The Night Before Christmas is an alternative title of the 1823 poem A Visit from St. Nicholas by Clement Clarke Moore.

The Night Before Christmas may also refer to:

== Literature ==
- "Christmas Eve" (Gogol), an 1832 short story by Nikolai Gogol, those original Russian title literally translates as The Night Before Christmas
- The Night Before Christmas, a 1941 Broadway play by Laura Perelman and S.J. Perelman; basis for the 1942 film Larceny, Inc.
- The Night Before Christmas, a 1995 play by Anthony Neilson
- The Night Before Christmas, a 1997 memoir by Alice Taylor
- The Nights Before Christmas, a 2001 novel by Vicki Lewis Thompson

== Film ==
=== Based on Moore's poem ===
- The Night Before Christmas (1905 film), an American silent short film directed by Edwin S. Porter
- The Night Before Christmas (1933 film), an American animated film in Walt Disney's Silly Symphonies series
- The Night Before Christmas (1941 film), an American Tom and Jerry cartoon directed by William Hanna and Joseph Barbera
- The Night Before Christmas, a 1968 American animated television special directed by Jim Pabian with music by Norman Luboff
- The Night Before Christmas, an animated feature film of 1994 based on the book by Mary Engelbreit.

=== Based on Gogol's story ===
- The Night Before Christmas (1913 film), a Russian silent film directed by Ladislas Starevich
- The Night Before Christmas (1951 film), a Russian animated film directed by the Brumberg sisters
- The Night Before Christmas (1961 film), a Russian film directed by Aleksandr Rou

== Music ==
- The Night Before Christmas (album), a 2004 album by David Hasselhoff
- The Night Before Christmas (Dai), a 2006 orchestral work based on Moore's poem, by Aaron Dai
- "Night Before Christmas" (song), a 2022 song by Sam Smith
- "The Night Before Christmas Song", a 1952 composition by Johnny Marks

== Other ==
- "The Night Before Christmas" (DDOS attack), the largest cyberattack recorded to date as of December 2025.

== See also ==
- A Night Before Christmas, a 2008 album by Spyro Gyra
- Christmas Eve (disambiguation)
- The Nightmare Before Christmas (disambiguation)
- Twas the Night Before Christmas (disambiguation)
