= Olga Khodataeva =

Soviet artist and animator

- Born: Olga Petrovna Khodataeva; February 26, 1894 stanitsa Konstantinovskaya, Don Host Oblast, Russian Empire
- Died: April 10, 1968 (aged 74); Moscow, USSR
- Occupation(s): Animation director, artist, animator, art director

Olga Petrovna Khodataeva (Russian: Ольга Петровна Ходатаева; 26 February [O.S. 14 February] 1894 — 10 April 1968) was a Soviet artist, animation director, animator and art director, one of the pioneers of the Soviet animation industry along with her brother Nikolai Khodataev. She is mostly remembered for her adaptations of traditional Slavic and Northern fairy tales.

== Biography ==
Olga Khodataeva was born in the Konstantinovskaya stanitsa (modern-day Konstantinovsk, Rostov Oblast of Russia), one of the three children of a tsarist official Peter Petrovich Khodataev. Her father was an illegitimate son of Agafia Kondratievna Khodataeva and a merchant from the Vladimir Governorate who seduced and left Agafia shortly after. Peter studied in the Rostov-on-Don realschule and married a local midwife Anna. He made a successful career and in 1898 moved his family to Moscow.

Both Olga and her elder brother Nikolai Khodataev became interested in painting early in their lives. They both entered the Moscow School of Painting, Sculpture and Architecture to study fine art and graduated in 1918. During the next six years Olga had worked as a graphic arts and a scenic designer.

In 1924 her brother along with the fellow artists Yuri Merkulov and Zenon Komissarenko organized an experimental workshop under the State School of Cinematography, the first Soviet animation studio where they produced a cutout short Interplanetary Revolution. Soon they were hired by the Soviet government to create an animated feature film China in Flames to support the Chinese national liberation movement. Because of the complexity of the work they invited a number of other young artists, including Olga. With 1000 meters of film and 14 frames per second the cartoon ran over 50 minutes at the time, which made it one of the world's first animated features.

For the next ten years she worked with her brother and the Brumberg sisters as a co-director, animator, art director and screenwriter. Their most famous works include One of Many (1927) that mixed live action and traditional animation in a story about the misadventures of a Komsomol girl in Hollywood; The Samoyed Boy (1928) stylized as traditional Nenets art and described by Khodataev as "the first steps in conquering the tradegy genre"; and The Little Organ (1933), an adaptation of The History of a Town that manifested "a plasticity of animation movement and the filmmaker's ability to nudge animation towards real art".

Both Khodataevs also created experimental animation for the Natalya Sats Musical Theater during the 1920s. Their ways parted in 1936 when Soyuzmultfilm was established in order to produce Disney-style shorts. Olga joined the collective, while Nikolai left the industry in disappointment, feeling that it wasn't up to bold experiments.

Kino-Circus (1942)

From then on Khodataeva directed and co-directed around 30 animated films mostly based on traditional Slavic fairy tales and folklore of the Indigenous small-numbered peoples of the North, Siberia and the Far East. With the start of the Great Patriotic War many animators left for the frontline or were evacuated from Moscow. Among those few left in the sieged city were Olga Khodataeva and Leonid Amalrik who produced several anti-Hitler sketches that were released under the Kino-Circus name in 1942 to a great acclaim.

Among her other successful works was Sarmiko (1952) about the adventures of a Chukchi boy which was named the Best Animated Film at the VII Karlovy Vary International Film Festival; Sister Alenushka and Brother Ivanushka (1953) adapted from one of the most popular Russian fairy tales; and The Flame of the Arctic (1956) which received the first prize at the VIII Kids and Teens International Film Festival in Venice and a golden medal at the 6th World Festival of Youth and Students in Moscow.

In 1960 Olga Khodataeva co-directed her last film Golden Feather with Leonid Aristov. She died eight years later in Moscow aged 74.

== See also ==
- History of Russian animation
