= Christmas Eve (disambiguation) =

Christmas Eve is the evening or day before Christmas Day.

Christmas Eve may also refer to:

== Film and theatre ==
- Christmas Eve (1947 film), an American comedy directed by Edwin L. Marin
- Christmas Eve, a 1986 American made-for-TV remake of the 1947 film, directed by Stuart Cooper
- Christmas Eve (2015 film), an American comedy directed by Mitch Davis
- Christmas Eve, a character in the Broadway musical Avenue Q
- "Christmas Eve", the fortieth episode of the NBC television series Superstore

== Literature ==
- "Christmas Eve" (Gogol), an 1832 short story by Nikolai Gogol
- "A Christmas Eve", a short story by Camillo Boito
- "Christmas-Eve and Easter-Day", a poem by Robert Browning

== Music ==
- Christmas Eve (opera), an 1895 opera by Nikolai Rimsky-Korsakov
- "Christmas Eve/Sarajevo 12/24", a 1995 medley performed by Savatage and the Trans-Siberian Orchestra
- Christmas Eve and Other Stories, a 1996 album by the Trans-Siberian Orchestra
- "Christmas Eve" (Gwen Stefani song), 2017
- "Christmas Eve" (Kelly Clarkson song), 2017
- "Christmas Eve", a song by Blackmore's Night from Winter Carols, 2006
- "Christmas Eve", a song by Celine Dion from These Are Special Times, 1998
- "Christmas Eve", a song by Justin Bieber from Under the Mistletoe, 2011
- "Christmas Eve", a song by Ringo Starr from I Wanna Be Santa Claus, 1999
- "Christmas Eve", a song by Tatsuro Yamashita from Melodies, 1983

== See also ==
- The Night Before Christmas (disambiguation)
- Twas the Night Before Christmas (disambiguation)
