= Nikolai Khodataev =

Russian artist

- Born: Nikolai Petrovich Khodataev; May 9, 1892 stanitsa Konstantinovskaya, Don Host Oblast, Russian Empire
- Died: December 27, 1979 (aged 87); Moscow, USSR
- Occupations: Artist, animator, sculptor

Nikolai Petrovich Khodataev (Russian: Николай Петрович Ходатаев; 9 May [O.S. 26 April] 1892 — 27 December 1979) was a Russian and Soviet artist, sculptor and animator, one of the founders of the Soviet animation industry.

== Early years ==
Nikolai Khodataev was born in the Konstantinovskaya stanitsa (modern-day Konstantinovsk, Rostov Oblast of Russia) where his father Peter Petrovich Khodataev served at the time. His paternal grandmother Agafia Kondratievna Khodataeva, a lonely Russian woman, was seduced by a merchant from the Vladimir Governorate and taken away from her native town. He left her as soon as she became pregnant, so that Peter Khodataev was born as an illegitimate son and raised under his mother's surname. The merchant didn't accept the child and later bought her off with a land and two houses. This allowed Agafia Khodataeva to give her son proper education at the Rostov-on-Don realschule. Peter soon married a local midwife Anna. By the time Nikolai was born, he had made a successful career as a tsarist official and could afford to pay for his son's art lessons.

In 1898 the family moved to Moscow. At the age of 20 Nikolai, who had already decided to study fine art at the Moscow School of Painting, Sculpture and Architecture, made a trip to the Caucasus in order to train in landscape painting. He was accepted as a student and finished the school in 1918 when it had already been reformed into Vkhutemas by the Soviet government. He continued studying at the architecture department and joined the State Committee for the Preservation of Ancient Monuments upon graduation.

== Career ==
Interplanetary Revolution (1924)

In 1924 Nikolai Khodataev along with the fellow artists Yuri Merkulov and Zenon Komissarenko were hired by Yakov Protazanov to make sketches for his upcoming science fiction movie Aelita. The three suggested to produce a segment that would have mixed live action with animation, but Protazanov rejected the idea. Khodataev then used his own money to set up an experimental workshop under the State School of Cinematography which became the first animation studio in the USSR. Their 20-minute film Interplanetary Revolution was one of the first Soviet animated films made as a parody of Aelita and the current political situation. The artists made excessive use of cutout animation (called flat marionettes at the time) along with the constructivism art style that was at its peak in Russia. These methods resulted in a distinguishable look and feel. The film was a great success.

In 1925 they were hired by the Soviet government to produce China in Flames, another cutout animation critical of European interference in Chinese economy, this time serious in tone and message. Vladimir Suteev along with the young Vkhutemas graduates Ivan Ivanov-Vano and the Brumberg sisters joined the team which led to a variety of art styles. With 1000 meters of film and 14 frames per second it ran over 50 minutes at the time, which made it the first Soviet animated feature film and one of the first in the world.

In 1926 Khodataev moved to Mezhrabpom-Rus where he directed a number of traditionally animated and live action films. Among his notable works were One of Many (1927) about the adventures of a Komsomol girl in Hollywood that featured both filming techniques and The Samoyed Boy (1928). The latter presented a story about a Nenets child that followed a dramatic narrative which Khodataev described as "the first steps in conquering the tragedy genre". It was stylized as traditional Nenets art and used an innovative technique of printing on thin celluloid. Same year he directed a live short Pushkin's Housewarming that was banned by censorship. His experiments started getting less and less support from government that wanted to see comic agitprop and advertisements instead which Khodataev despised.

The Samoyed Boy (1928)

Between 1928 and 1935 he worked at Sovkino. In 1933-1934 he directed his last two animated films: The Little Organ, an adaptation of The History of a Town by Mikhail Saltykov-Shchedrin, and Fialkin's Career about an ambitious fool. Both featured original graphical style inspired by the works of Vladimir Favorsky as well as smooth animation, "manifesting a plasticity of animation movement and the filmmaker's ability to nudge animation towards real art". Nevertheless, they went almost unnoticed, which made Khodataev question the purpose of his work. He left animation around the time Soyuzmultfilm was created, feeling that the industry wasn't up to bold experiments.

Nikolai Khodataev spent the rest of his days living in a shadow and dedicated his life to art and sculpture. According to his friends and relatives, he used every opportunity to paint everything that surrounded him. In contrast to animation, in art he preferred the Renaissance period, drew many portraits, mostly women. He also took part in art exhibitions. In addition, he wrote articles for the Soviet Screen and Iskusstvo Kino magazines and produced animation for theatrical plays staged at the Natalya Sats Musical Theater.

Nikolai Khodataev died in Moscow in 1979. He was survived by his daughter Nela and his son Konstantin, also an artist. His sister Olga Khodataeva (1894—1968) was also a prominent Soviet animator who worked with her brother on some of his major films before joining Soyuzmultfilm. Their brother Alexei Khodataev, a musician, left memoirs that give insight into the history of the Khodataev family.

== Films ==
- 1924 — Interplanetary Revolution
- 1924 — How Avdotya Learned to Read
- 1924 — 1905—1925
- 1925 — China in Flames
- 1925 — Start
- 1926 — How Murzilka Learned to Write Addresses Correctly
- 1927 — Let's Be Vigilant
- 1927 — Let's Make the LovKom Good!
- 1927 — One of Many
- 1928 — The Samoyed Boy
- 1928 — Terrible Vavila and Auntie Arina
- 1928 — Ten Rools of Cooperation
- 1928 — By Day With a Flame
- 1928 — Pushkin's Housewarming
- 1928 — Gather Yourself, LovKom Is Coming!
- 1928 — Defalcation
- 1930 — Spring Sowing
- 1930 — Eureka
- 1931 — The Car Lover
- 1932 — Disarmament
- 1932 — Fly Ahead, Locomotive!
- 1933 — The Little Organ (or The Music Box)
- 1934 — Fialkin's Career
- 1942 — Cinema Circus (as animator)

== See also ==
- History of Russian animation
