= 'Twas the Night Before Christmas (disambiguation) =

'Twas the Night Before Christmas is an alternative title of the 1823 poem A Visit from St. Nicholas by Clement Clarke Moore.

'Twas the Night Before Christmas may also refer to:

- 'Twas the Night Before Christmas (1974 TV special), a Rankin-Bass animated Christmas special
- 'Twas the Night Before Christmas (1977 TV special), a Christmas special starring Paul Lynde
- 'Twas the Night Before Christmas, a 2022 Hallmark Channel Original Movie
- Twas the Night Before Christmas (smoke-free version), a 2012 children's book adaptation of Moore's poem with references to smoking removed
- "'Twas the Night Before Christmas", an early-1940s song by Ken Darby and the King's Men

== See also ==
- "'Twas the Night Before Christmas...Again", an episode of the television series Tru Calling
- 'Twas the Night (film), a 2001 Disney Channel movie
- Christmas Eve (disambiguation)
- The Night Before Christmas (disambiguation)
- The Nightmare Before Christmas (disambiguation)
