= Takeshi Moriuchi =

Japanese conductor

- Born: Tokyo, Japan
- Education: Mozarteum
- Occupations: Conductor; Pianist
- Organizations: Oper Frankfurt

Takeshi Moriuchi (born 1975) is a Japanese conductor, based at the Oper Frankfurt in Germany.

== Career ==
Moriuchi was born in Tokyo; both parents had studied singing without making it their profession. He sang in choirs as a boy. He studied piano in Japan, but went to Europe for further studies in 2003. He studied at the Mozarteum in Salzburg and then worked at the Landestheater Linz, first as répétiteur, then as kapellmeister. He moved to the Oper Frankfurt with the 2018/19 season, where he has worked as Studienleiter (head of studies), which has included not only preparing singers for the performances, but also conducting performances, accompaniment of recitals and stepping in as a singer when needed. In his first year at the house, a conductor had health problems in a performance of Verdi's La forza del destino that Moriuchi attended, and he was asked if he was ready to conduct the rest of the performance. He said yes although he had never conducted the piece, aware that otherwise the audience had to be sent home.

In 2023 Moriuchi conducted Rimsky-Korsakov's Die Nacht vor Weihnachten, a rarely played work that had been selected as "Performance of the Year" by the critics of the Opernwelt trade magazine when it was revived in 2022, directed by Christof Loy. His conducting was credited with highlighting the composer's genius in instrumentation, especially of clarinets and bassoons in the strings context; he was praised for filling with life both mass and dance scenes and intimate monologues sounding like chamber music.

In 2024 Moriuchi conducted the opening performance of a new production of Henze's Der Prinz von Homburg, directed by Jens-Daniel Herzog, with Domen Križaj in the title role and Magdalena Hinterdobler as Natalie.
