= Cherevichki =

Opera by Pyotr Ilyich Tchaikovsky

- Revision of Vakula the Smith by Tchaikovsky
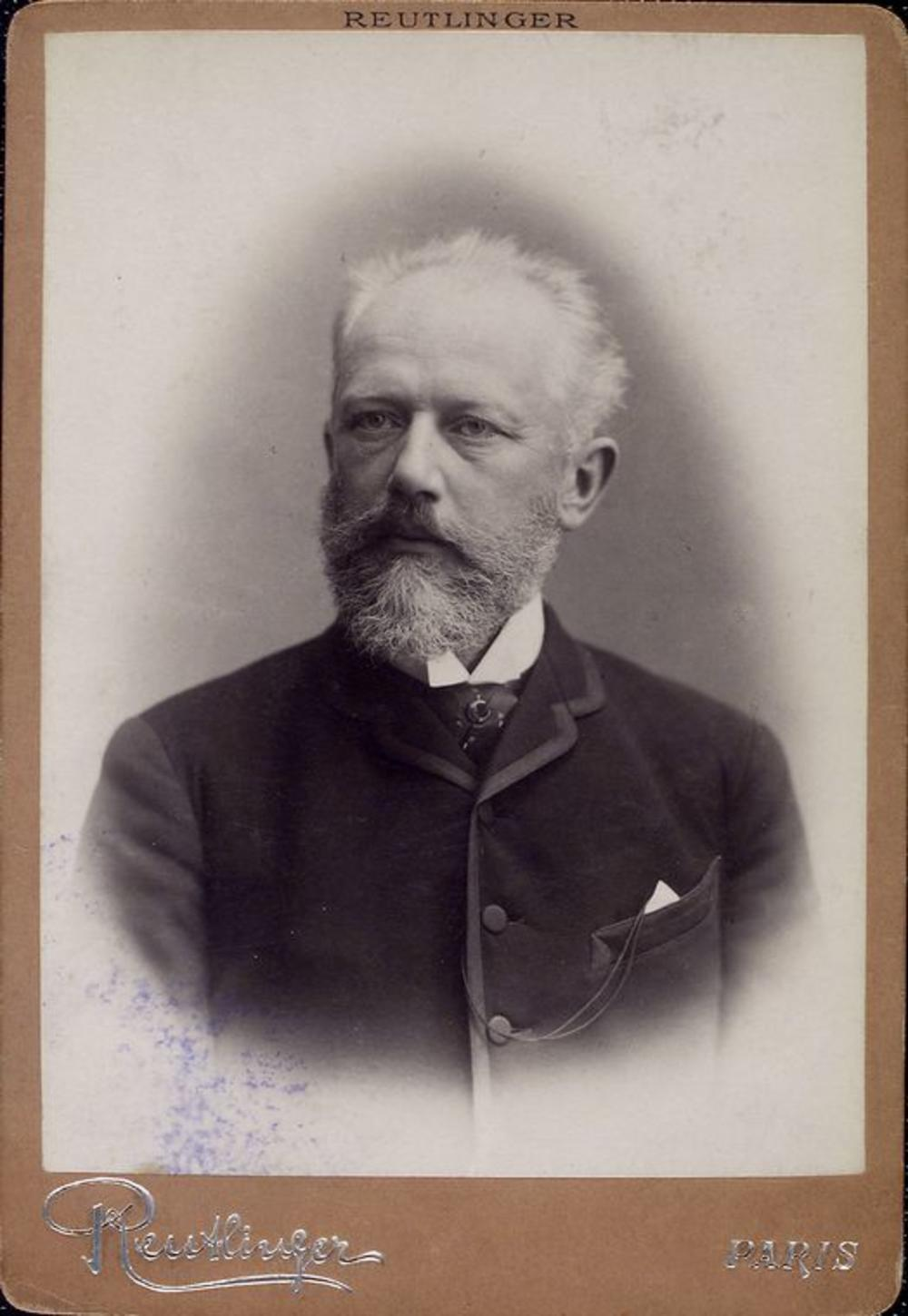
- Tchaikovsky in 1888
- Native title: Russian: Черевички
- Librettist: Yakov Polonsky
- Language: Russian
- Based on: "Christmas Eve" by Gogol
- Premiere: 31 January 1887; Bolshoi Theatre in Moscow

Cherevichki (Russian: Черевички, Ukrainian: Черевички), The Slippers is a comic-fantastic opera in 4 acts, 8 scenes, by Pyotr Ilyich Tchaikovsky. It was composed in 1885 in Maidanovo, near Klin, Russia. The libretto was written by Yakov Polonsky, and is based on the story "Christmas Eve", part of the 1832 collection Evenings on a Farm Near Dikanka, by Nikolai Gogol. The opera is a revision of Tchaikovsky's earlier opera Vakula the Smith. The work was first performed in 1887 in Moscow.

== Composition history ==
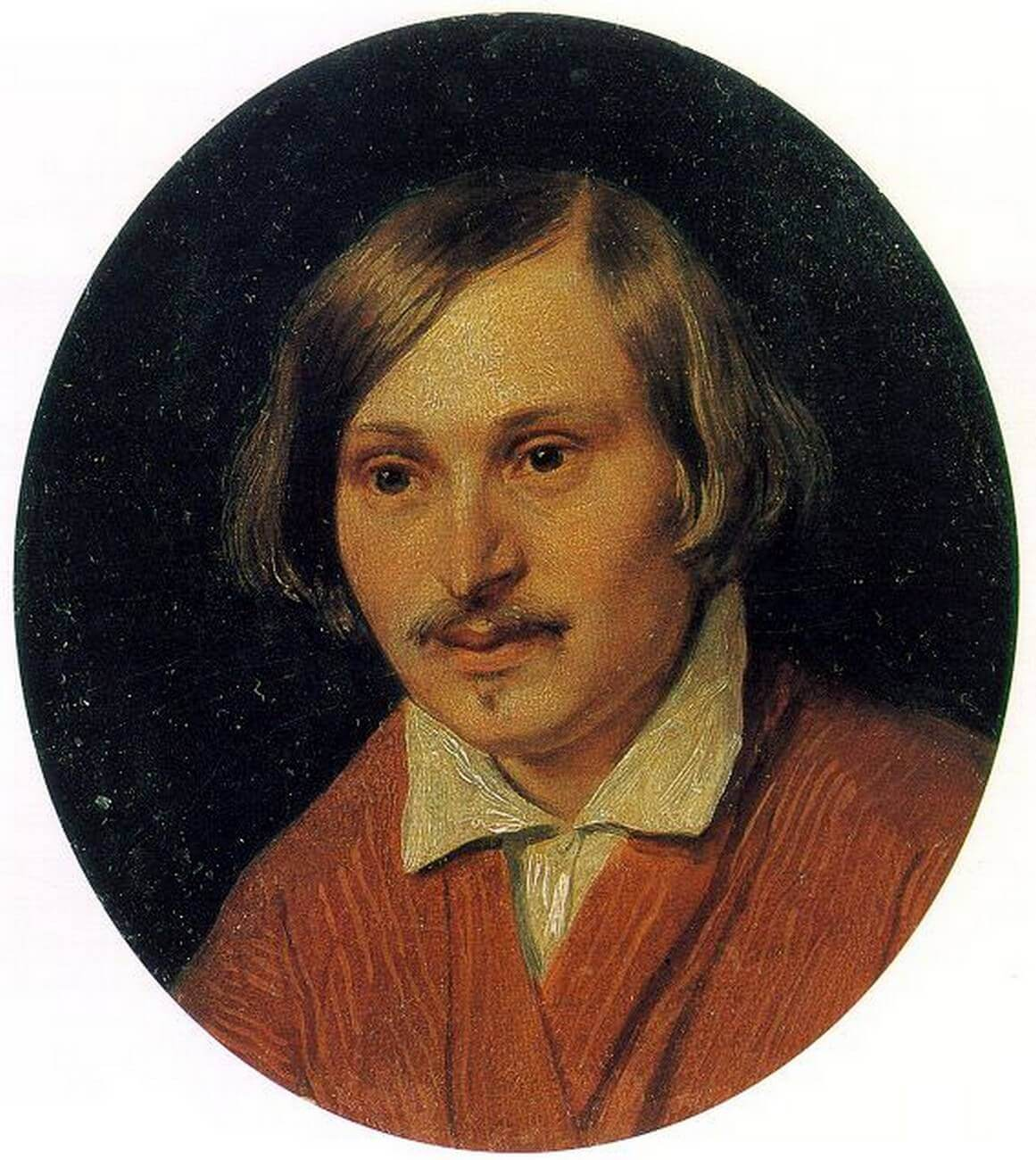
Nikolay Gogol (1809–1852)

The opera was composed between February and April 1885 at Maidanovo. Both Vakula the Smith and Cherevichki were set to Polonsky's libretto, which was originally intended for Alexander Serov, but had remained unused on account of his death. Additions and revisions for this second version were made by the composer and Nikolay Chayev.

The main thematic material of the second version of the opera is the same as in Vakula the Smith. The alterations were caused by a wish to help the opera "out of the river of oblivion" (letter by Tchaikovsky of 4 March 1885). The editing primarily simplified some elements of musical texture. The lyric sphere of the opera was deepened by the introduction of a new aria inserted for Vakula: Slyshit li devitsa serdtse tvoe... (Who knows, my girl, if your heart can feel my pain...). But the addition of the song of the School Teacher and the verses of His Highness enrich the genre part of the opera. Tchaikovsky also changed the cast of the chorus scenes, as in No. 13 (Kolyadka).

== Performance history ==
The premiere was given on 31 January 1887 [OS January 19] at the Bolshoi Theatre in Moscow conducted by Tchaikovsky (it was his debut as a conductor) with stage direction by A. I. Bartsal and scenic design by K. F. Valts. During the 20th century the opera was performed very rarely, revived almost exclusively within Russia and the USSR. It received its Polish premiere in the Baltic Opera House in Gdańsk on 28 June 1952. Wexford Festival Opera presented five performances of a new production in October 1993 condcuted by Alexander Anisimov and produced by Francesca Zambello. It was shown in the United Kingdom for the first time at Garsington Opera on 26 June 2004, and then at The Royal Opera House Covent Garden on 20 November 2009. One of the later performances was broadcast, recorded and released in DVD and blu-ray.

== Roles ==
English	Voice type	Premiere cast 31 January [OS January 19] 1887 (Conductor: Composer)
Vakula, a smith	tenor	Dmitri Usatov
Solokha, Vakula's mother, a witch	mezzo-soprano	A. V. Svyatlovskaya
Chub, an elderly Cossack	bass	Ivan Matchinsky
Oksana, Chub's daughter	soprano	Maria Klimentova-Muromtseva
A devil from Hell, a fantastic character	bass	Bogomir Korsov
Schoolmaster	tenor	Aleksandr Dodonov
Pan Golova, Chub's crony	bass	V. S. Streletsky
Panas, Chub's crony	tenor	P. N. Grigoryev
His Highness	bass	Pavel Khokhlov
Master of Ceremonies	bass	R. V. Vasilyevsky
Attendant	tenor	
Old Cossack	bass	
Wood Goblin	bass	
chorus, silent roles (Lads, lasses, elders, gusli-players, rusalki, wood-sprites, echo, spirits, court ladies and gentlemen, Zaporozhtsy)

== Instrumentation ==
Source: Tchaikovsky Research

- Strings: Violins I, Violins II, Violas, Cellos, Double Basses
- Woodwinds: Piccolo, 2 Flutes, 2 Oboes, 2 Clarinets (B-flat and A), 2 Bassoons
- Brass: 4 Horns (all F), 2 Trumpets (F and E), 3 Trombones, Tuba
- Percussion: Timpani, Triangle, Tambourine, Cymbals, Bass Drum,
- Other: Harp
- On/Offstage: Wind Band (off)

Some numbers were also arranged for voices with piano or for piano duet (4 hands) by Tchaikovsky in 1885.

== Synopsis ==
Time: The end of the 18th century

Place: In the village of Dikanka, Ukraine; St. Petersburg

=== Act 1 ===
The widow Solokha agrees to help the Devil steal the Moon. The Devil is annoyed with Solokha's son Vakula who painted an icon mocking him. The Devil decides to create a snowstorm to prevent Vakula from seeing his beloved Oxana. While the storm rages, Solokha rides up to the sky and steals the Moon, while Oxana's father Chub and the Deacon are unable to find their way. Oxana is alone and lonely at home. She passes through several moods and the music follows her with gradually accelerating tempos. At one point, Vakula enters and watches her admiring herself. She teases him, and he says he loves her. Chub comes back out of the storm, and Vakula, not recognizing him, chases him out by striking him. Seeing what he has done, Oxana sends Vakula away in a miserable state. Young people from the village come around singing Ukrainian Christmas carols. Oxana realizes she still loves Vakula.

=== Act 2 ===
In a peculiar and amusing first scene three men and the Devil wind up in three sacks at Solokha's hut after successively trying to seduce her, and Vakula winds up hauling the heavy sacks away. Outside three groups of carollers contend. Oxana shames Vakula into getting her the Tsaritsa's boots or else she won't marry him. He runs threatening suicide, leaving two bags which turn out to have the Deacon and Chub.

=== Act 3 ===
A forest sprite warns water nymphs that Vakula is coming and that he wants to commit suicide. The Devil jumps out of Vakula's sack and tries to get his soul in exchange for Oxana but Vakula instead climbs on the Devil's back. Vakula forces the Devil to take him to St. Petersburg. The Devil puts down Vakula in the tsaritsa's court and disappears into the fireplace. Vakula joins a group of cossacks who are going to see the tsaritsa. In the hall of columns, a chorus sings the tsaritsa's praises, a polonaise. Vakula requests the tsaritsa's boots in a minuet, and it is granted because it is an unusual and amusing thing to ask. The Devil takes Vakula away as Russian and Cossack dances commence.

=== Act 4 ===
The Act opens in the town square on a bright Christmas morning. Solokha and Oxana think Vakula has drowned himself, and mourn for him. Oxana runs off weeping when villagers invite her to the Christmas feast. Vakula returns with the boots, asks Chub to forgive him for the beating and asks for Oxana's hand in marriage. She enters, tells Vakula that she wants him, not the silly boots. Chub calls for the kobzari (the lutenists), and everyone celebrates.

== Structure ==
Overture

Act 1
Scene 1

No. 1 Scene and Duet (Solokha, Devil)
No. 2 Snowstorm

Scene 2

No. 3 Aria (Oksana)
No. 4 Scene and Arioso (Oksana, Vakula)
No. 5 Scene (Oksana, Chub, Vakula)
No. 6 Scene and Duet (Vakula, Oksana)
No. 7 Final Scene (Oksana, Vakula, Choir)

Act 2
Scene 1

Entr'acte
No. 8 Scene (Solokha, Devil)
No. 9 Scene (Pan Golova, Solokha)
No. 10 Scene (Deacon, Solokha)
No. 11 Scene and Quintet (Chub, Solokha, Vakula, Deacon, Devil)
No. 12 Arioso (Vakula)

Scene 2

No. 13 Choral Scene
No. 14 Scene and Cherevichki Song
No. 15 Finale (Oksana, Vakula, Chub, Choir)

Act 3
Scene 1

Ent'’acte
No. 16 Chorus of Rusalkas
No. 17 Scene and Vakula's Song (Vakula, Devil)

Scene 2

No. 18 Scene (Devil, Vakula, an Old Zaporozhian Cossack, Choir)

Scene 3

No. 19 Polonaise (Vakula, Master of Ceremonies, His Highness, Choir)
No. 20 Couplets (His Highness, Choir)
No. 21 Minuet and Scene (Vakula, Catherine II, His Highness, Choir)
No. 22 Russian dance and Cossack dance
No. 23 Scene (Master of Ceremonies, Devil, Vakula

Act 4

No. 24 Duet (Solokha, Oksana)
No. 25 Finale (Oksana, Chub, Pan Golova, Panas, Solokha, Vakula, Choir)

== Related works ==
- Lysenko: the opera Christmas Eve (1872)
- Tchaikovsky: The opera Vakula the Smith (1874, the earlier version of Cherevichki)
- Rimsky-Korsakov: The opera Christmas Eve (1895)

Lysenko's and Rimsky-Korsakov's Christmas Eve operas and Tchaikovsky's Vakula the Smith/Cherevichki are all based on the same story by Gogol.

== Recordings ==
1948 Bolshoy Theatre

2000 Cagliari Lyric Theatre
- 1948, Aleksandr Melik-Pashayev, Bolshoi Theatre Orchestra and Chorus, Georgii Nelepp (Vakula), Elisabeta Antonov (Solokha), Aleksey Petrovich Ivanov (Devil), Maxim Mikhailov (Chub), Yelena Dimitrievna Kruglikova (Oksana), Sergei Krasovsky (Village-head), Fedor Godovkin (Panas), Alexander Peregudov (Deacon), Andrey Alexeyevich (His Highness), O. Insarova (Yekaterina II), Ivan Ionov (Master of ceremonies), I. Sipaev (Zaporozhian Cossack), Mikhail Skazin (Forest Sprite)
- 1973, Fedoseyev, USSR Radio Large Chorus and Symphony Orchestra, Vladimir Fedoseyev – Череви; Nina Fomina, Ludmilla Simonova, Konstantin Lisovsky, Alexei Krivchenya, Oleg Klenov (Melodiya)
- 2000, Gennady Rozhdestvensky, Cagliari Lyric Theater Orchestra and Chorus, Fabio Bonavita, Pavel Cernoch, Ekaterina Morosova, Vladimir Ognovenko, Vladimir Okenko, Grigory Osipov, Valeri Popov, Valentin Prolat, Albert Schagidullin, Ludmila Semciuk, Barseg Tumanyan, Frantisek Zahradnicek
- 2004, Howarth/Duprels/McCafferty/Dwyer/Zimnenko/Earle (Garsington label)
- 2009, (released 2010) Blu-Ray and DVD by Opus Arte/Naxos: Vsevolod Grivnov (Vakula), Olga Guryakova (Oxana), Larissa Diadkova (Solokha), Maxim Mikhailov (The Devil), Vladimir Matorin (Chub), John Upperton (Panas), Alexander Vassiliev (Pan Golova), Viacheslav Voynarovskiy (The Schoolmaster), Olga Sabadoch (Odark), Changhan Lim (Wood Goblin), Andrew Macnair (Echo), Sergei Leiferkus (His Highness), Jeremy White (Master of Ceremonies) & Mara Galeazzi & Gary Avis (Principal Dancers), Dancers of The Royal Ballet & Orchestra of The Royal Opera House, Alexander Polianichko (conductor), Francesca Zambello (stage director)
- An orchestral suite entitled "Les Caprices d'Oxane" was arranged from the opera by Constantine Saradjeff (1877-1954) and recorded in 1953 by the Philharmonia Orchestra, conductor Anatole Fistoulari, for the Parlophone label. The title used on the LP was "The Slippers" but when reissued on the Guild CD label in 2014 it became "The Tsarina's Slippers."

== See also ==
- List of Christmas operas
