= Konstantinovsky District, Rostov Oblast =

Konstantinovsky District Константиновский район (Russian)
- District
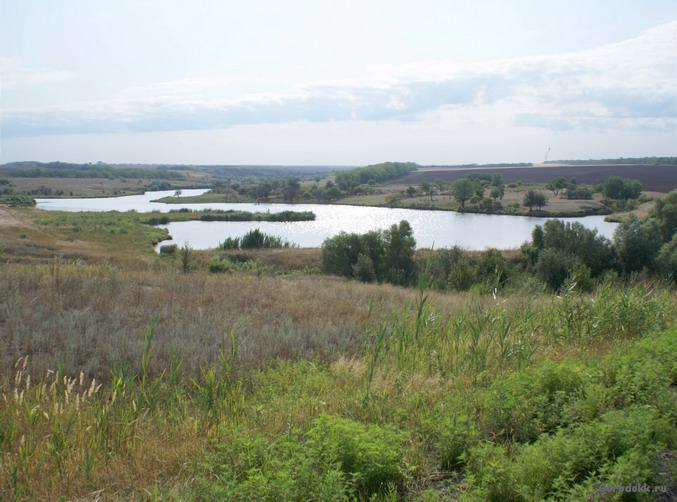
- Lower Zhuravka, Konstantinovsky District

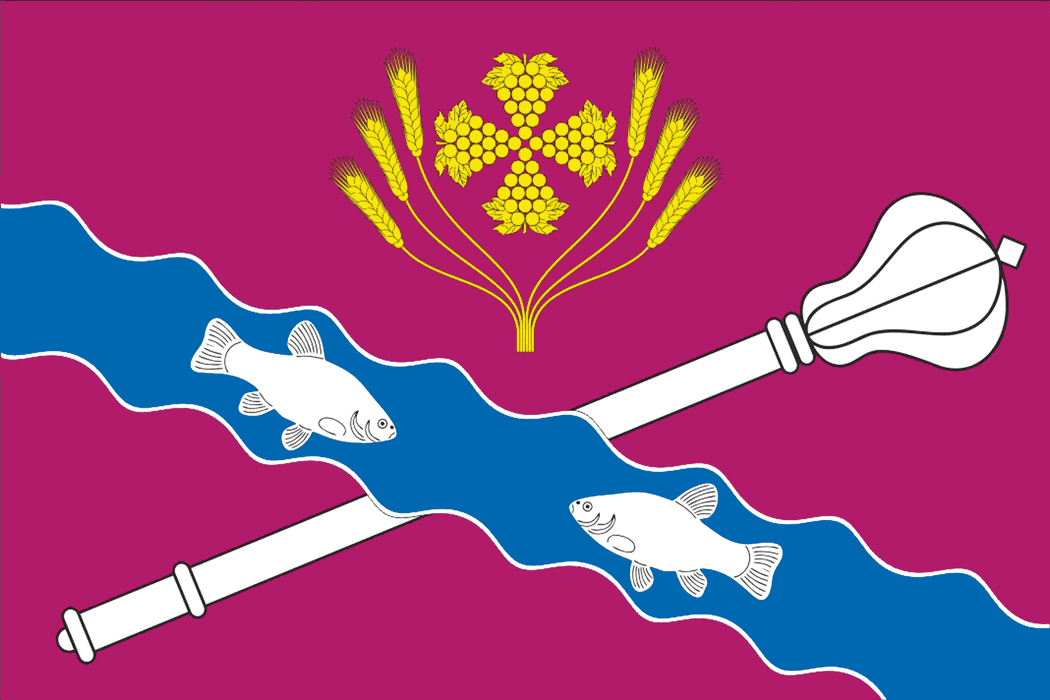
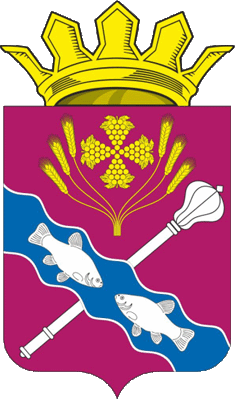
- Flag Coat of arms
- Location of Konstantinovsky District in Rostov Oblast
- Coordinates: 47°35′N 41°06′E
- Country: Russia
- Federal subject: Rostov Oblast
- Established: 1924
- Administrative center: Konstantinovsk

Area
  - Total: 2,200 km^{2} (850 sq mi)

Population (2010 Census)
  - Total: 33,159
  - Density: 15/km^{2} (39/sq mi)
  - Urban: 54.1%
  - Rural: 45.9%

Administrative structure
  - Administrative divisions: 1 Urban settlements, 6 Rural settlements
  - Inhabited localities: 1 cities/towns, 42 rural localities

Municipal structure
  - Municipally incorporated as: Konstantinovsky Municipal District
  - Municipal divisions: 1 urban settlements, 6 rural settlements
- Time zone: UTC+3 (MSK)
- OKTMO ID: 60625000
- Website: http://konstantin.donland.ru/

Konstantinovsky District (Russian: Константи́новский райо́н) is an administrative and municipal district (raion), one of the forty-three in Rostov Oblast, Russia. It is located in the center of the oblast. The area of the district is 2,200 square kilometers (850 sq mi). Its administrative center is the town of Konstantinovsk. Population: 33,159 (2010 Census); 36,595 (2002 census); 36,741 (1989 Soviet census). The population of Konstantinovsk accounts for 54.1% of the district's total population.

== Notable residents ==
- Sergei Trufanov (1880–1952), hieromonk, preacher, pan-slavist
