= Mikhail Yanshin =

Soviet actor (1902–1976)

- Михаил Яншин
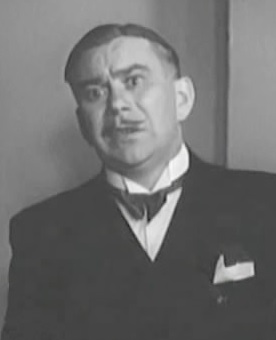
- Yanshin in The Acceptance of Catastrophes (1941)
- Born: Mikhail Mikhailovich Yanshin; 20 October 1902; Yukhnov, Smolensk Governorate, Russian Empire
- Died: 17 July 1976 (aged 73); Moscow, Russian SFSR, Soviet Union
- Occupation: Actor
- Years active: 1924–1976

Mikhail Mikhailovich Yanshin (Russian: Михаил Михайлович Яншин; 20 October 1902 – 17 July 1976) was a Soviet stage and film actor.

== Biography ==
Yanshin was born in the city of Yukhnov, located in the present-day Kaluga Oblast. As a young man he worked as a carpenter. In 1919 he volunteered for the Red Army. Following the Russian Civil War, he enrolled at the school of the Moscow Art Theatre, where his classmates included Mikhail Kedrov and Boris Livanov. He joined the theatre's company in 1924 and remained a member of the institution until his death.

Yanshin's first notable roles at the Art Theatre were as Dobchinsky in Gogol's The Government Inspector and as the footman Petrushka in Griboyedov's Woe from Wit. He came to greater attention in the role of Lariosik in Bulgakov's Days of the Turbins, and thereafter began to receive work in other theaters. From 1934 to 1939 he was artistic director of the Moscow Theatre of the Forest Industry; from 1937 to 1941 he directed the Romen Theatre; and from 1950 to 1963 he was chief director of the Stanislavski and Nemirovich-Danchenko Moscow Academic Music Theatre. In 1963 Yanshin was criticized by the Soviet ministry of culture, which disapproved of his staging contemporary, non-traditional plays; he resigned and returned to the Moscow Art Theatre, where he was instrumental in the hiring of the director Oleg Yefremov.

In addition to his theatrical work, Yanshin appeared in many films. He was a frequent voice actor for Soyuzmultfilm cartoons, and often collaborated with the animators Zinaida and Valentina Brumberg. In addition to working as a voice actor, he also wrote the script of the Brumbergs' 1951 film The Night Before Christmas.

Yanshin was married three times. His first wife was Veronika Polonskaya, a fellow artist at the Moscow Art Theatre, whom he married in 1926. She is notable for having pursued an extra-marital affair with the poet Vladimir Mayakovsky, and both she and Yanshin were present when Mayakovsky committed suicide in 1930. They divorced in 1934, and that same year Yanshin married Nadezhda Kiselyova (stage name Lyalya Chyornaya), a dancer at the Rumen Theatre. They divorced in 1942, and Kiselyova later married Yanshin's old classmate Nikolai Khmelyov. From 1955 until his death Yanshin was married to Nonna Meyer, a performer at the Stanislavski Theatre.

He died in 1976 in Moscow and was buried at Novodevichy Cemetery.

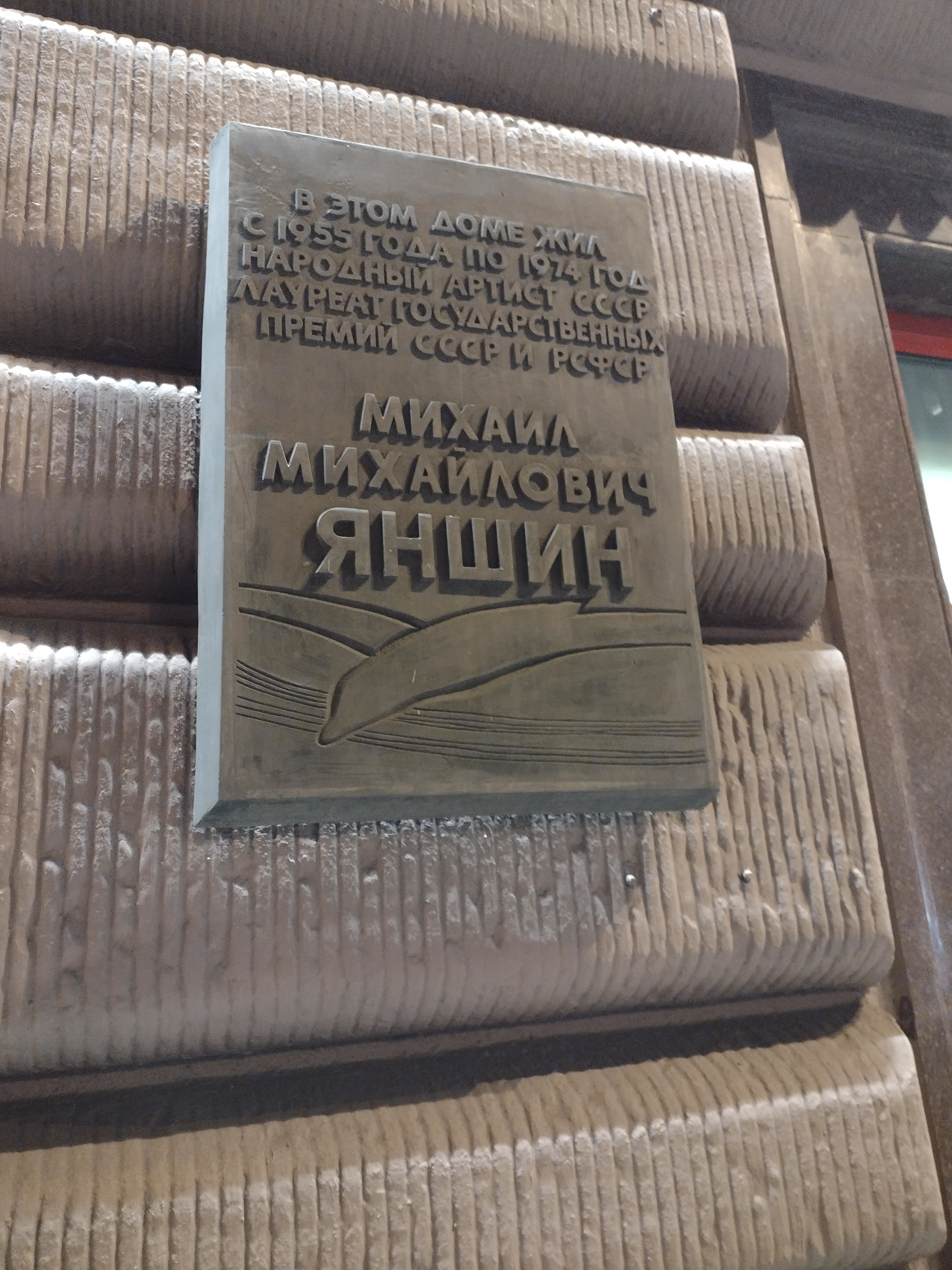
Historical plaque on his former home in Moscow

== Theatrical roles ==
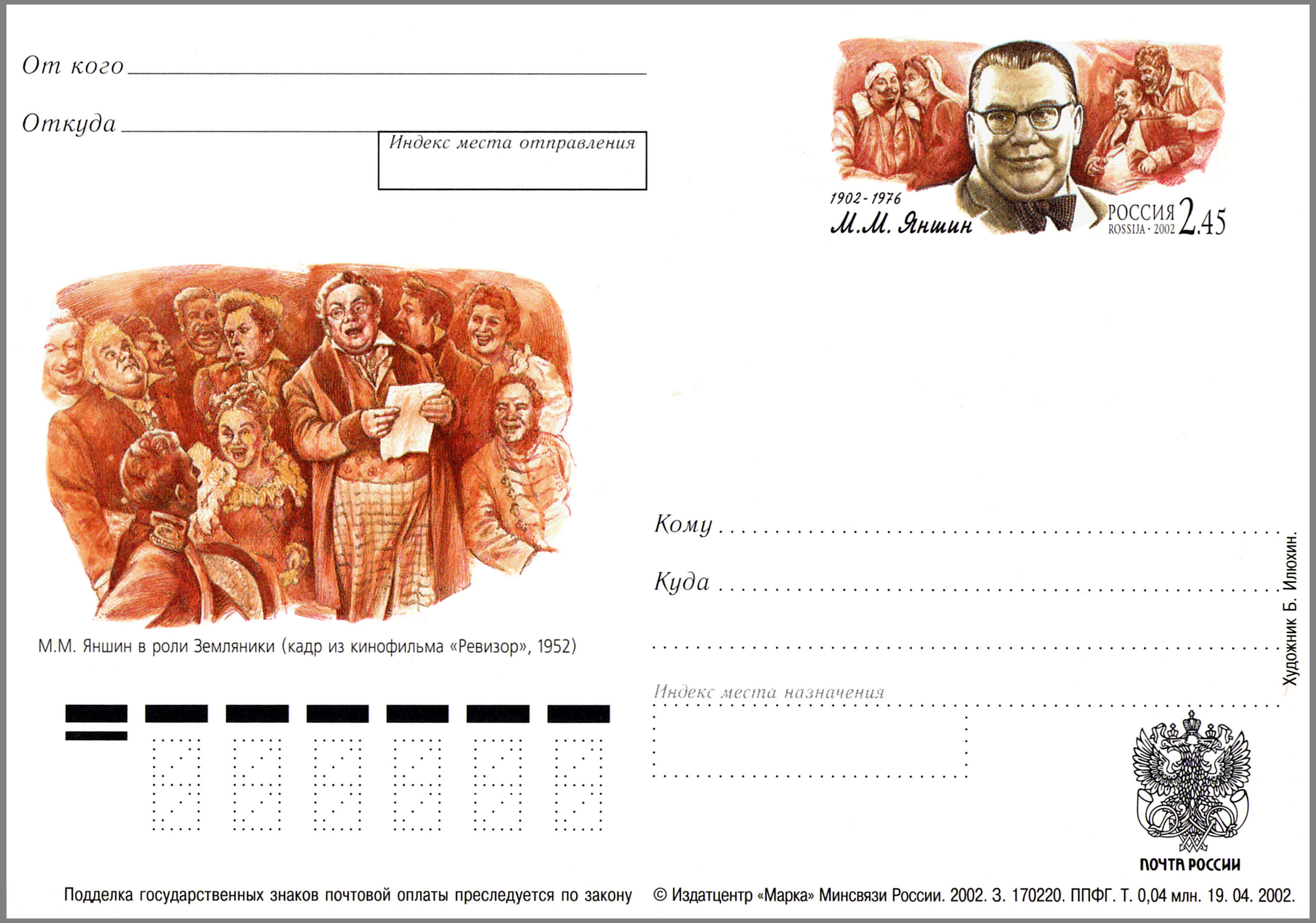
The 2002 postal card issued to commemorate the 100th birth anniversary of Yanshin.

- Three Sisters by Anton Chekhov – Ivan Chebutykin
- Uncle Vanya by Anton Chekhov – Ilya Ilyich Telegin
- The Seagull by Anton Chekhov – Pyotr Sorin
- The School for Scandal by Richard Brinsley Sheridan – Sir Peter
- Late Love by Alexander Ostrovsky – Margaritov
- Fortune's Fool by Ivan Turgenev – Vasily Kouzovkin
- Solo for Hours of Battle by Osvald Zahradník – Abel
- Even a Wise Man Stumbles by Alexander Ostrovsky – Nil Fedoseevich Mamaev
- Days of the Turbins by Mikhail Bulgakov – Lariosik

== Selected filmography ==
Year	Title	Role
1930	St. Jorgen's Day	Uncredited role
1933	Okraina	Soldier
1934	Lieutenant Kijé	Tsar Paul I
1945	The Lost Letter	Various
1946	The Great Glinka	Pyotr Vyazemsky
1946	The Stone Flower	Severyan
1951	The Night Before Christmas	Choub
1952	The Unforgettable Year 1919	Colonel Butkevich
1955	Twelfth Night	Sir Toby Belch
1960	It Was I Who Drew the Little Man	The Little Man
1960	Dead Souls	Ivan Andreevich, postmaster
1964	Jack Frost	Father Mushroom
1964	A Little Frog Is looking for His Father	Hippopotamus
1972	Big School-Break	Professor Volosyuk

== Awards and honors ==
- Meritorious Artist of the RFSFR (1933)
- Order of the Badge of Honour (1937)
- People's Artist of the RFSFR (1947)
- People's Artist of the USSR (1955)
- Order of Lenin (1948 and 1972)
- Order of the Red Banner of Labour (1971)
- USSR State Prize (1975)
- Stanislavsky State Prize of the RSFSR (1970)
