= Brumberg sisters =

Russian Soviet animators

Valentina Brumberg
- Born: Valentina Semyonovna Brumberg; August 2, 1899; Moscow, Russian Empire
- Died: November 28, 1975 (aged 76); Moscow, Soviet Union
- Occupation: Animation director
- Years active: 1924–1974

Zinaida Brumberg
- Born: Zinaida Semyonovna Brumberg; August 2, 1900; Moscow, Russian Empire
- Died: February 9, 1983 (aged 82); Moscow, Soviet Union
- Occupation: Animation director
- Years active: 1927–1974

Valentina Semyonovna Brumberg (Russian: Валентина Семёновна Брумберг; 2 August [O.S. 21 July] 1899 — 28 November 1975) and Zinaida Semyonovna Brumberg (Russian: Зинаида Семёновна Брумберг; 2 August [O.S. 20 July] 1900 — 9 February 1983), commonly known as the Brumberg sisters, were among the pioneers of the Soviet animation industry. In half a century they created around 50 films as animation directors, animators and screenwriters, always working together. They were named Honoured Workers of the Arts Industry of the RSFSR in 1968.

== Biography ==
Valentina and Zinaida Brumberg were born in Moscow into a Jewish family. Their father Semyon Brumberg was a doctor who later took part in World War I, while their mother Cecilia Brumberg was a music teacher. They were described by their friends as "two complete opposites": Valentina — as a short, active woman always obsessed with ideas and Zinaida — as a tall, slow woman who preferred to sit at home. In 1916 both sisters graduated from a Moscow gymnasium with Diplomas of Education. In 1918 they entered Vkhutemas, which they finished in 1925.

Same year they joined the Experimental Workshop led by Nikolai Khodataev, Yuri Merkulov and Zenon Komissarenko to work on the cutout feature film China in Flames made in support of the Chinese national liberation movement. With 1000 meters of film and 14 frames per second it ran over 50 minutes at the time, which made it one of the world's first animated features. It was also noted for a variety of art styles contributed by various young animators such as the Brumberg sisters, Ivan Ivanov-Vano and Vladimir Suteev.

In 1928 they co-directed their first hand-drawn animated short The Samoyed Boy together with Nikolai Khodataev and Olga Khodataeva, another brother-and-sister team. It was stylized as traditional Nenets art and followed a dramatic narrative which Khodataev described as "the first steps in conquering the tragedy genre". In 1934 they joined forces with Ivanov-Vano and co-directed Tsar Durandai (also known as The Tale of Tsar Durandai) based on the satirical Russian fairy tale and filled with impressive animation.

Tsar Durandai (1934), surviving part

In 1936 the Brumberg sisters along with many other Moscow-based animators moved to the newly founded Soyuzmultfilm where they focused on creating Disney-styled shorts based on the popular children's fairy tales such as Little Red Riding Hood and The Magic Swan Geese. Since 1937 they had been directing films on their own.

With the start of the Great Patriotic War in 1941 they were evacuated to Samarkand and then — to Almaty along with other key animators. They continued making films, including anti-fascist propaganda. During that time they directed The Tale of Tsar Saltan which was released in 1943 shortly after they returned to Moscow, and by 1945 they finished The Lost Letter which ran over 40 minutes, making it the earliest surviving traditionally animated Soviet feature film. They actively applied rotoscoping (known as Eclair in the Soviet Union after the Eclair video projector) and even invited Igor Moiseyev to stage the dances.

During the next 15 years they produced a number of other Eclair-based features and short films such as The Night Before Christmas (1951) and The Island of Mistakes (1955), often teaming with their close friend, a comedy actor Mikhail Yanshin who not only lent his appearance, movements and voice, but also worked as a screenwriter and consulting director, providing them with the talents of the Moscow Art Theatre.

At the same time, 1948 was marked by the release of Fedya Zaitsev about the adventures of a stickman in Moscow. Despite accusations of formalism and hidden subtexts, it was very popular among children, and the stickman turned into an emblem of Soyuzmultfilm for many years.

With It Was I Who Drew the Little Man (1960), a full-length remake of Fedya Zaitsev, the Brumberg sisters joined the new wave of animation brought by the Khrushchev thaw. They abandoned rotoscopy and moved away from realistic art style towards more experimental forms. Big Troubles (1961) was stylized as primitivistic child's drawings, while the characters in Three Fat Men (1963) based on the popular Soviet fairy tale of the same name consisted of simple geometric shapes. They directed a number of satirical shorts, as well as adaptations of the Brothers Grimm fairy tales and Oscar Wilde's The Canterville Ghost (1970).

The Brumberg sisters left the industry in 1974, and in just a year Valentina Brumberg died of illness. Zinaida Brumberg died six years later. They were buried in Moscow.

== Selected filmography ==
- 1925 — China in Flames — artists, animators
- 1928 — The Samoyed Boy — co-directors, artists, screenwriters (with Nikolai Khodataev and Olga Khodataeva)
- 1934 — Tsar Durandai — co-directors, screenwriters (with Ivan Ivanov-Vano)
- 1943 — The Tale of Tsar Saltan — directors, screenwriters
- 1945 — The Lost Letter — directors, screenwriters
- 1948 — Fedya Zaitsev — directors
- 1951 — The Night Before Christmas — directors, screenwriters
- 1955 — The Island of Mistakes — directors
- 1960 — It Was I Who Drew the Little Man — directors
- 1961 — Big Troubles — directors
- 1963 — Three Fat Men — directors
- 1968 — Puss in Boots — directors
- 1969 — The Capricious Princess — directors
- 1970 — The Canterville Ghost — directors

== See also ==
- History of Russian animation
- Alexandra Snezhko-Blotskaya
