= The Night Before Christmas (Dai) =

2006 orchestral work by Aaron Dai

The Night Before Christmas is an orchestral work written by the American composer Aaron Dai in 2006. The work is performed by a full orchestra and a narrator reading Clement Clarke Moore's 1823 poem 'Twas the Night Before Christmas.

== History ==
The Night Before Christmas premiered in New York City on December 2, 2006 with The Chelsea Symphony and actor Richard Kind. It has since been narrated by Ana Gasteyer (2007), David Hyde Pierce (2008), Charles Busch (2009), Andrea Martin (2010), Rachel Dratch (2011), Mo Rocca (2012), Victor Garber (2013), BD Wong (2014), Seth Rudetsky (2015), Caroline Rhea (2016), Judy Gold (2017), Annie Golden (2018), Mario Cantone (2019), John Lithgow (2020, virtual due to the COVID-19 pandemic), Christian Coulson (2021), Eve Plumb (2022), Bellamy Young (2023), Will Swenson (actor) (2024), and Lauren Ambrose (2025).

Moore's poem was selected partly due to the nominal connection between the author's home and the orchestra that would debut the musical work. 'Twas the Night Before Christmas was penned in 1822 on Moore's country estate—named "Chelsea"—which eventually became the Manhattan district Chelsea, which, in turn, provided the name for The Chelsea Symphony. Dai's The Night Before Christmas premiered less than two blocks from the site of the original poem's writing.

== Instrumentation ==
The Night Before Christmas is scored for a narrator and an orchestra, including:

- 2 flutes
- 2 oboes
- 2 clarinets in B♭
- 2 bassoons
- contrabassoon (optional)
- 4 horns
- 2 trumpets in B♭
- 2 trombones
- tuba
- timpani
- suspended cymbal
- triangle
- tambourine
- snare drum
- glockenspiel
- strings
