= Yevgeniya Mravina =

Russian opera singer (1864–1914)

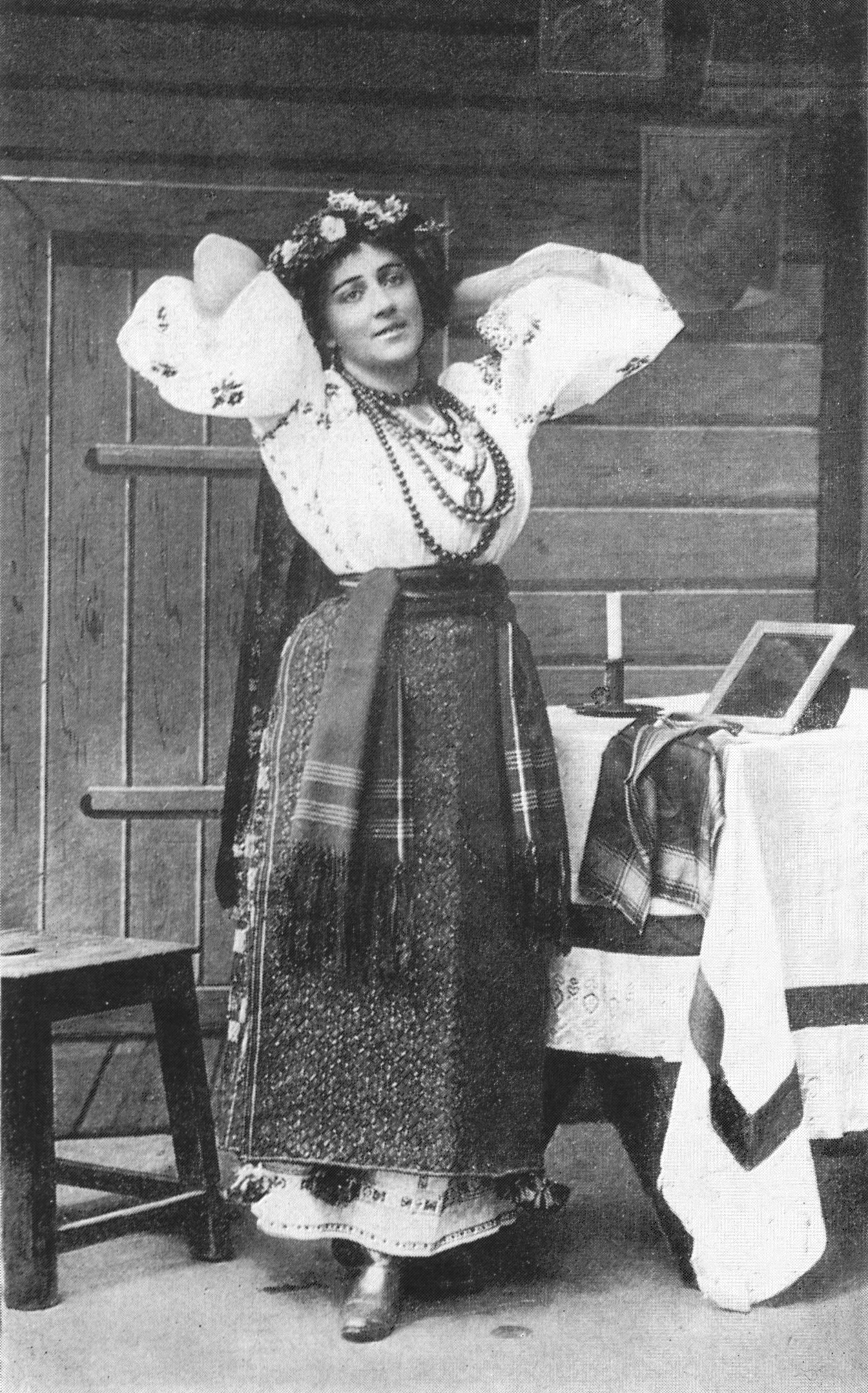
Mravina sang the role of Oksana in the premiere of Christmas Eve (Mariinsky Theatre, St. Petersburg, 1895).

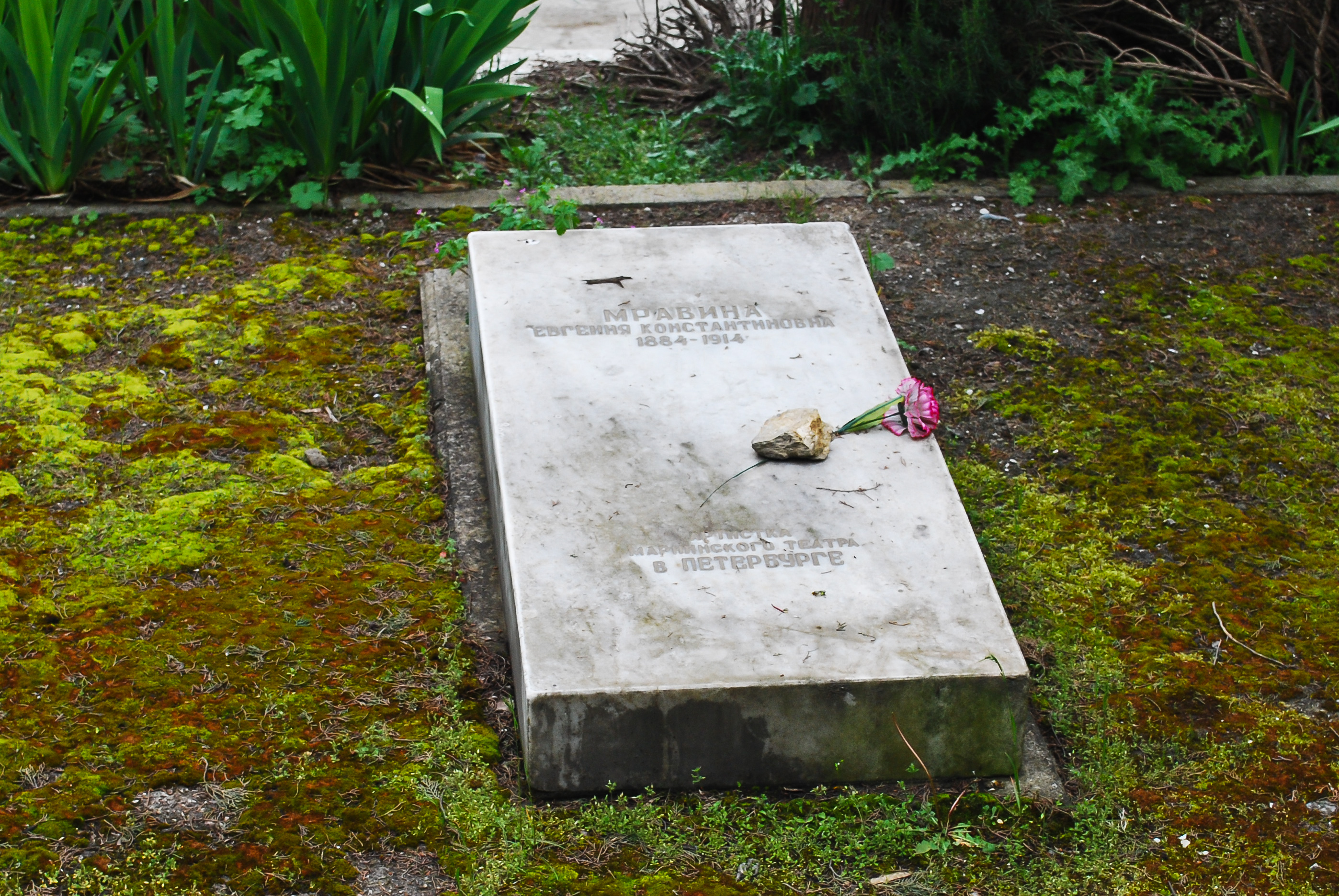
Mravina's grave in the Polikur memory cemetery in Yalta, Crimea

Yevgeniya Konstantinovna Mravinskaya (Russian: Евгения Константиновна Мравинская), better known by her stage name Yevgeniya or Evgenia Mravina (Russian: Евгения Мравина; 16 February [O.S. 4 February] 1864 – 24 October [O.S. 12 October] 1914) (Note: Russia was still using old style dates in the 19th century, and information sources used in the article sometimes report dates as old style rather than new style. Dates in the article are taken verbatim from the source and therefore are in the same style as the source from which they come.) was a Russian lyric soprano, a half sister of revolutionary Alexandra Kollontai and the aunt of conductor Yevgeny Mravinsky.

== Life ==
Born in Saint Petersburg, Mravina studied there with Ippolit Pryanishnikov, then in Berlin with Désirée Artôt and in Paris with Mathilde Marchesi. She made her debut in the role of Gilda in Giuseppe Verdi's opera Rigoletto at Vittorio Veneto in August 1885 and was principal soloist at the Mariinsky Theater between 1886 and 1897. Mravina quit the Saint Petersburg stage in 1900 over a conflict with the Direction of the Imperial Theaters; from 1900 to 1903 she toured extensively in Russia. She made three European tours—in 1891–1892, 1902–1903 and 1906—but by the last tour her voice and health were already deteriorating. She gave her final concert in Saint Petersburg in 1906, and died in Yalta in 1914.

== Roles ==
Mravina was noted particularly for roles which required virtuoso singing and conveyed a good deal of her characters' ardent natures. Concerned with the stage presence of her roles, she frequently consulted with N.F. Sazamov, the Alexandrinsky Theater's star actor, on issues of dramatic creativity, and took rhythm and dancing lessons from ballet dancer A.D. Chistayakov. Her best-known parts included Antonida in Mikhail Glinka's opera A Life for the Tsar, Lyudmila in Glinka's Ruslan and Lyudmila, Tatyana in Pyotr Ilyich Tchaikovsky's Eugene Onegin and Oxana in Nikolai Rimsky-Korsakov's Christmas Eve; the last named role was considered especially suited for Marvina's acting ability, tonal purity and musical intelligence. She also sang in operas by Charles Gounod, Giacomo Meyerbeer and Richard Wagner. Tchaikovsky envisioned Mravina in the role of Liza in The Queen of Spades but bowed to tenor Nikolay Figner's preference to cast his wife Medea in that role for the premiere. Later, when Medea Figner was to be replaced by Mariya Sionitskaya, Tchaikovsky regretted that Mravina could not sing the role.
