= Vakula the Smith =

1876 opera by Pyotr Ilyich Tchaikovsky

- Opera by Tchaikovsky
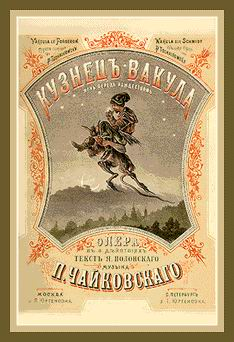
- Cover of a piano reduction
- Native title: Russian: Кузнец Вакула
- Librettist: Yakov Polonsky
- Language: Russian
- Based on: "Christmas Eve" by Gogol
- Premiere: 6 December 1876; Mariinsky Theatre, Saint Petersburg

Vakula the Smith (Russian: Кузнец Вакула, romanized: Kuznets Vakula, lit. 'Smith Vakula'), Op. 14, is a Ukrainian-themed opera in 3 acts, 8 scenes, by Pyotr Ilyich Tchaikovsky. The libretto was written by Yakov Polonsky and is based on Nikolai Gogol's 1832 story "Christmas Eve" (Russian: Ночь перед Рождеством, Noch péred Rozhdestvóm). It was written for composer Alexander Serov, who died in 1871 leaving only fragments of an opera on the subject.

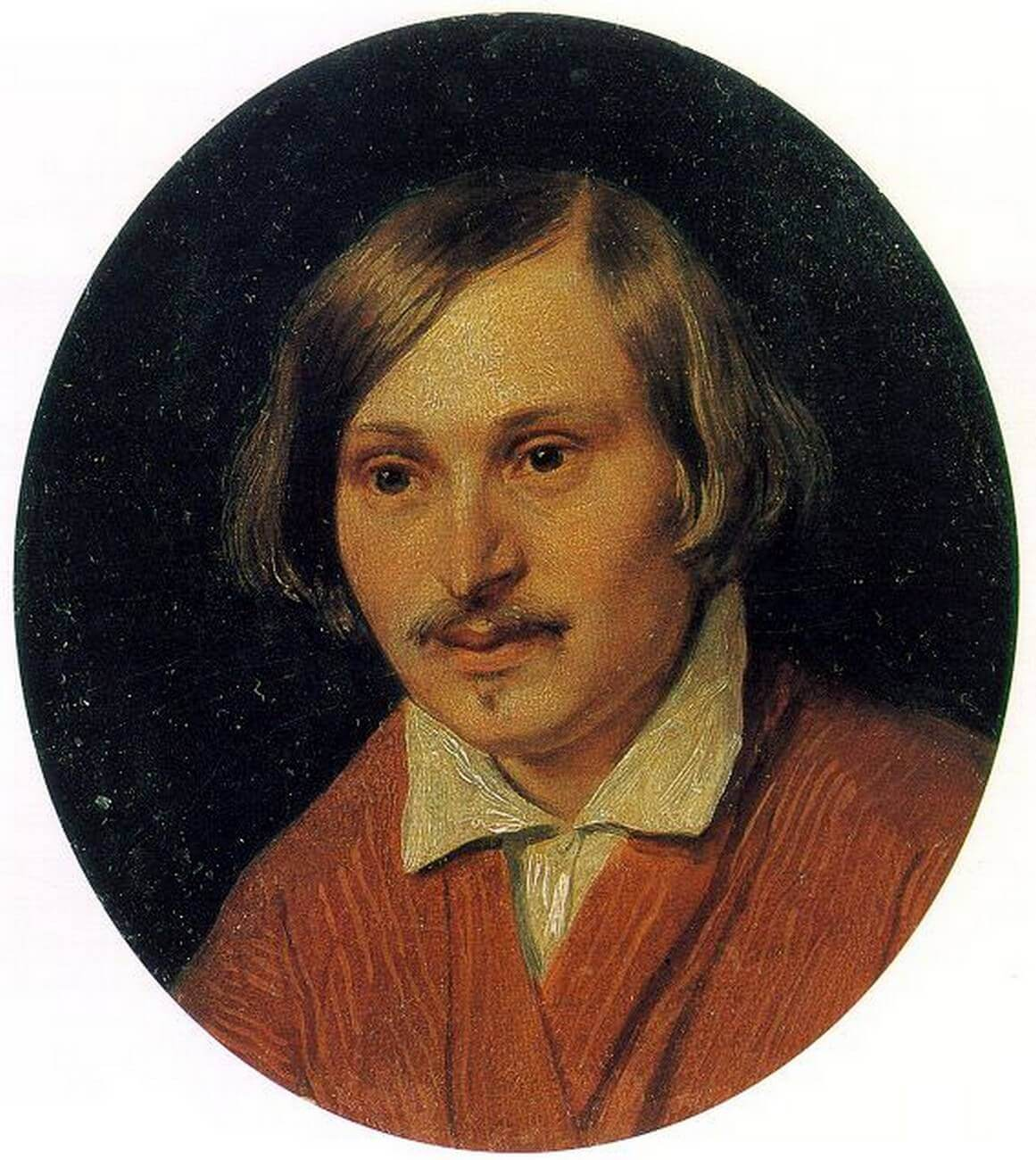
Nikolay Gogol (1809–1852)

== Composition history ==
The opera was composed between June and 21 August 1874; it was begun during a holiday in Nyzy (in Kharkov province) and finished in Usovo. The work was dedicated to the memory of the Grand Duchess Elena Pavlovna, who had died in 1873. When Tchaikovsky anonymously submitted the score for a competition under the motto "Ars longa vita brevis est" ("Art is eternal, life is short"), it won, and the composer received 1500 rubles. The opera was revised as Cherevichki (The Slippers) in 1885.

== Performance history ==
The premiere took place in Saint Petersburg on 6 December [o.s. November 24] 1876 at the Mariinsky Theatre, conducted by Eduard Nápravník with stage direction by Gennadiy Kondratyev and set design by Mikhail Bocharov and Matvey Shishkov.

== Roles ==
Role	Voice type	Premiere cast St. Petersburg 6 December 1876 (Conductor: Eduard Nápravník
Vakula, a smith	tenor	Fyodor Komissarzhevsky
Solokha, Vakula's mother, a witch	mezzo-soprano	Anna Bichurina
A devil from Hell, a fantastic character	bass	Ivan Melnikov
Chub, an elderly Cossack	bass	I. Matchinsky
Oksana, Chub's daughter	soprano	Wilhelmina Raab
Pan Golova	bass	Osip Petrov
Panas, Chub's crony	tenor	V. Vasiliev
Schoolmaster	tenor	N. von Derviz
His Highness	bass	Fyodor Stravinsky
Master of Ceremonies	bass	
Attendant	tenor	Pavel Dyuzhikov
Old Cossack	bass	
Wood Goblin	bass	
Chorus, silent roles: Lads, lasses, elders, gusli-players, rusalki, wood-sprites, echo, spirits, court ladies and gentlemen, Zaporozhtsï

The stage history of the opera was short. The opera was given 18 times over several seasons at the Mariinsky Theatre, but Tchaikovsky did not permit it to be performed at other theatres. Dissatisfied with the opera, Tchaikovsky revised it in 1885 as Cherevichki (The Slippers).

== Instrumentation ==
Source: www.tchaikovsky-research.net

- Strings: Violins I, Violins II, Violas, Cellos, Double Basses
- Woodwinds: Piccolo, 2 Flutes, 2 Oboes, 2 Clarinets (B-flat and A), 2 Bassoons
- Brass: 4 Horns (all F), 2 Trumpets (F and E), 3 Trombones, Tuba
- Percussion: Timpani, Triangle, Tambourine, Cymbals, Bass Drum,
- Other: Harp
- On/Offstage: Wind Band (off)

== Synopsis ==
Time: The end of the 18th century

Place: In the village of Dikanka, Ukraine; St. Petersburg

The widow Solokha agrees to help the Devil steal the moon. The Devil is annoyed with Solokha's son Vakula who painted an icon mocking him. The Devil decides to create a snowstorm to prevent Vakula from seeing his beloved Oxana. While the storm rages, Solokha rides up to the sky and steals the moon, while Oxana's father Chub and the Deacon are unable to find their way. Oxana is alone and lonely at home. She passes through several moods and the music follows her with gradually accelerating tempos. At one point, Vakula enters and watches her admiring herself. She teases him, and he says he loves her. Chub comes back out of the storm, and Vakula, not recognizing him, chases him out by striking him. Seeing what he has done, Oxana sends Vakula away in a miserable state. Young people from the village come around singing Ukrainian Christmas carols. Oxana realizes she still loves Vakula. Three men and the Devil wind up in three sacks at Solokha's hut after successively trying to seduce her, and Vakula winds up hauling the heavy sacks away. Outside three groups of carollers contend. Oxana shames Vakula into getting her the Tsaritsa's boots or else she won't marry him. He runs threatening suicide, leaving two bags which turn out to have the Deacon and Chub.

A forest sprite warns water nymphs that Vakula is coming and wants to commit suicide. The Devil jumps out of Vakula's sack and tries to get his soul in exchange for Oxana but Vakula instead climbs on the Devil's back. Vakula forces the Devil to take him to St. Petersburg. The Devil puts down Vakula in the tsaritsa's court and disappears into the fireplace. Vakula joins a group of cossacks who are going to see the tsaritsa. In the hall of columns, a chorus sings the tsaritsa's praises to a polonaise. Vakula requests the tsaritsa's boots to a minuet, and it is granted because it is an unusual and amusing thing to ask. The Devil takes Vakula away as Russian and Cossack dances commence. The next scene takes place at the town square on a bright Christmas morning. Solokha and Oxana think Vakula has drowned himself and mourn for him. Oxana runs off weeping when villagers invite her to the Christmas feast. Vakula returns with the boots, asks Chub to forgive him for the beating and asks for Oxana's hand in marriage. She enters, tells Vakula that she wants him, not the silly boots. Chub calls for the kobzari (the lutenists), and everyone celebrates.

== Tchaikovsky's thoughts on the opera ==
- "All my thoughts are now intent upon my beloved child, darling Vakula the Smith. You would not imagine how I love him! It seems to me that I will positively go mad if I don't succeed with him" (Pyotr Tchaikovsky, from the letter to Anatoly Tchaikovsky May 12, 1875)
- "[There are] two fundamental shortcomings: first, the style of Vakula is not operatic, but symphonic; and the second, there is no correspondence between the music and what is taking place on stage... but the music of Vakula is almost without exception noble and beautiful with respect to both theme and harmony." (César Cui, Sankt-Peterburgskie vedomosti, November 30, 1876)

== Related works ==
Some numbers were arranged for voices with piano or for piano duet (4 hands) by Tchaikovsky in 1874.

- Mykola Lysenko: The opera Christmas Night (1872; premiered 1874 in Kyiv)
- Tchaikovsky: The opera Cherevichki (1885), a revision of Vakula the Smith
- Nikolai Rimsky-Korsakov: The opera Christmas Eve (1895)

== See also ==
- List of Christmas operas
