= Aaron Dai =

American composer and pianist

- Born: 1967 (age 58–59); San Francisco, California, U.S.
- Education: University of Pennsylvania; University of Houston; Columbia University; Mannes College of Music
- Occupations: Composer; Pianist; Architect
- Years active: 1996–present

Chinese name
- Traditional Chinese: 戴海清
Transcriptions
Yue: Cantonese
- Jyutping: Daai^{3} Hoi^{2} Cing^{1}
- Website: aarondai.com

Aaron Dai (born August 3, 1967) is an American composer and pianist known for his orchestral and choral music. He is best known for his The Night Before Christmas for Narrator and Orchestra and his fifteen-minute miniature opera Hamlet. He is a founding member of and the resident composer for The Chelsea Symphony and has been the pianist for the New York City Gay Men's Chorus since October 2010.

Dai is considered a polymath. He graduated from the University of Pennsylvania with a degree in biology in 1989, after which he worked in neurotransmitter research in the field of molecular neuropharmacology. He graduated from the University of Houston in 1995 and the Graduate School of Architecture, Planning and Preservation at Columbia University in 1996 with graduate degrees in architecture and continues to work as an architect today. In 2005, he received a diploma in piano performance from the Mannes College of Music. Dai is a member of Mensa, a social organization whose members are in the top 2% of intelligence.
