= The Nightmare Before Christmas (disambiguation) =

The Nightmare Before Christmas is a 1993 film produced by Tim Burton.

The Nightmare Before Christmas may also refer to:

== Related to the film ==
- The Nightmare Before Christmas (soundtrack), a soundtrack album from the film
- The Nightmare Before Christmas Trading Card Game, a collectible card game
- The Nightmare Before Christmas: The Pumpkin King, a 2005 video game for the Game Boy Advance
- The Nightmare Before Christmas: Oogie's Revenge, a 2005 video game for the PlayStation 2 and Xbox
- The Nightmare Before Christmas (poem), a poem by Tim Burton, the inspiration for the 1993 animated film

== Music ==
- The Nightmare Before Christmas, a 2010 installment of the UK music festival All Tomorrow's Parties

== Television ==
- "The Nightmare Before Christmas", 7 Little Johnstons season 6, episode 2 (2019)
- "The Nightmare Before Christmas", Holby City series 19, episode 11 (2016)
- "The Nightmare Before Christmas", Kate & Allie season 5, episode 12 (1987)
- "The Nightmare Before Christmas", Queenie episode 4 (2024)
- "'Twas the Nightmare Before Christmas", The Golden Girls season 2, episode 11 (1986)

== See also ==
- The Night Before Christmas (disambiguation)
