= Yuri Merkulov =

Soviet actor (1901–1979)

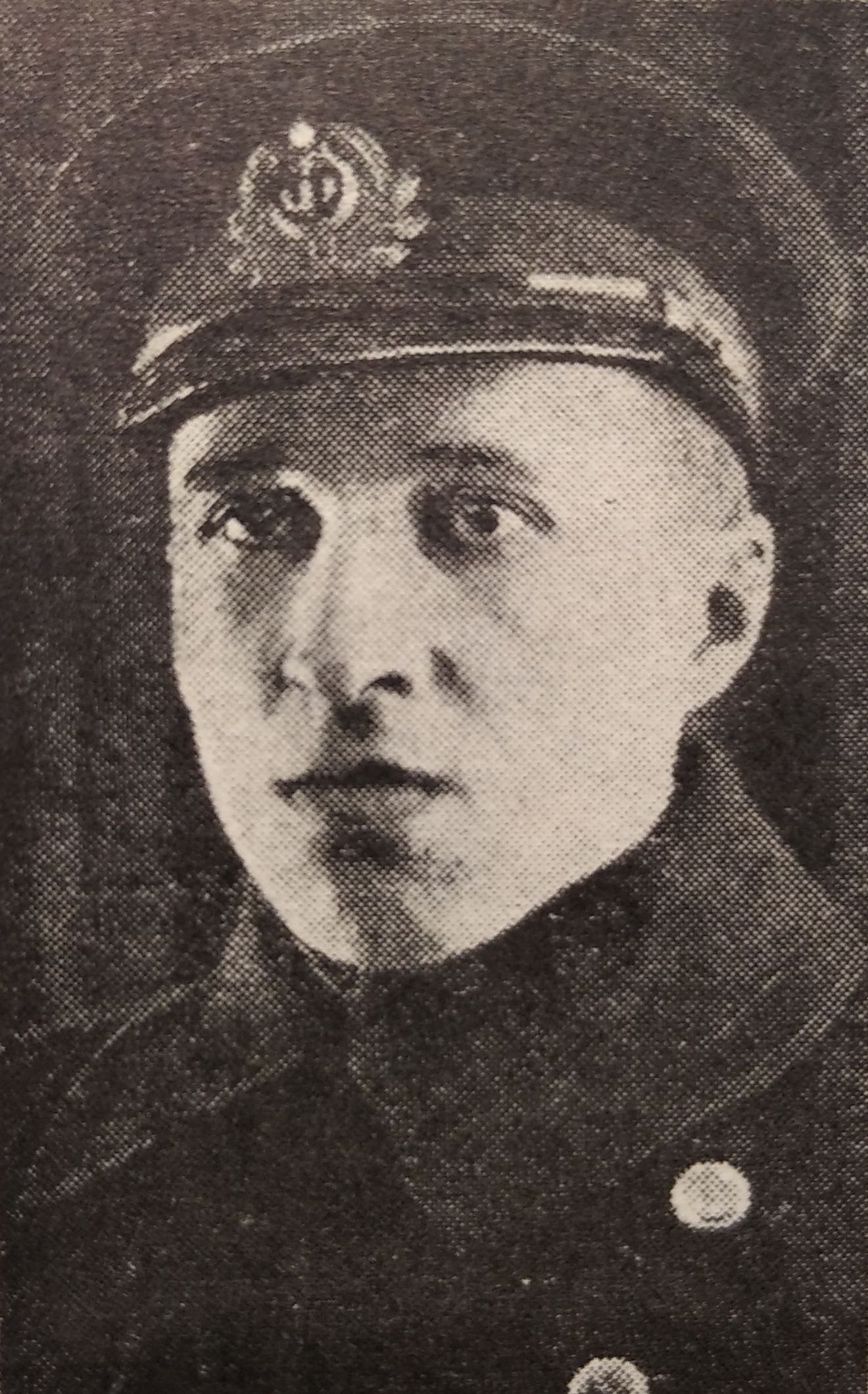
- Yuri Merkulov
- Born: Yuri Alexandrovich Merkulov; April 28, 1901; Rasskazovo village, Tambov Governorate, Russian Empire
- Died: February 13, 1979 (aged 77); Moscow, USSR
- Occupations: Artist, animator, film director

Yuri Alexandrovich Merkulov (Russian: Юрий Александрович Меркулов; 28 April [O.S. 15 April] 1901 – 13 February 1979) was a Soviet artist, animation and film director, conservator-restorer, inventor, film theorist and actor. He is known as one of the founders of the Soviet school of traditional and stop motion animation.

== Early years ==
Yuri Merkulov was born in the Rasskazovo village (modern-day town of Rasskazovo, Tambov Oblast of Russia) into a wealthy Russian family. He was one of the seven children of Alexander Nikolaevich Merkulov (1869–1924), a prominent surgeon and a member of the Russian Society of Doctors who inspected, organized and reorganized medical clinics all over the country. During World War I he headed one of the Moscow military hospitals, and after the October Revolution he founded the Moscow Institute of Traumatology, working closely with Nikolai Semashko. Yuri's mother Maria Karlovna Merkulova (1870–1944) was a professional piano player who dedicated herself to raising children.

Yuri became interested in art early in his life and entered Fyodor Rerberg's Moscow School of Painting. During the war he and his sisters worked at their father's hospital, mending wounded soldiers. He then served in the Soviet Navy and on his return joined Vkhutemas where he studied under Ilya Mashkov until 1923. He became closely associated with the Soviet Avant-Garde art movement, taking part in various progressive coalitions, including Vladimir Mayakovsky's collective of modern artists where he drew ROSTA posters and designed scenery for the Mystery-Bouffe play, among other things. Together with Daniil Cherkes he also decorated agit-trains; it was during that time they came up with the idea of "animated posters", the earliest kind of Soviet animation based on the art by Dmitry Moor, Viktor Deni and Mikhail Cheremnykh.

== Career ==
In 1923, Merkulov along with Nikolai Khodataev and Zenon Komissarenko produced sketches for the Aelita science fiction movie. As Yakov Protazanov rejected the idea of mixing live action with animation, the three founded their own experimental workshop under the State School of Cinematography, the first Soviet animation studio. By 1924 they finished Interplanetary Revolution — a cutout animation parody on Aelita and the current political situation that became very popular. In a year, they were hired by the Soviet government to produce China in Flames, another political satire critical of European interference in Chinese economy. Vladimir Suteev, Ivan Ivanov-Vano and the Brumberg sisters joined the team which led to a variety of styles. With 1000 meters of film and 14 frames per second, it ran over 50 minutes at the time, which made it the first Soviet animated feature film and one of the first in the world. After that Merkulov, Khodataev and Komissarenko went their own ways.

China in Flames (1925)

In 1926, Yuri joined Mezhrabpom-Rus and organized an animation department there. Together with Ivanov-Vano he drew animated sequences for Vsevolod Pudovkin's Mechanics of the Brain, the first Soviet popular science movie that received praise from both Ivan Pavlov and international medical specialists. His old friend Daniil Cherkes joined them in their next project — a live-action animated film Senka the African (1927) based on the comedy poem by Korney Chukovsky about a little boy who travelled to Africa on a balloon. It combined hand-drawn and cutout scenes with live action sequences, becoming one of the first Soviet films aimed at children along with The Skating Rink by Yuri Zhelyabuzhsky. Merkulov also directed animated sequences for A Kiss from Mary Pickford comedy movie.

In 1928, he launched the first Soviet animated series Bratishkin's Adventures at Mosfilm, this time combining live action with stop motion animation to tell short comedy stories that involved Bratishkin — a tiny sailor who travelled through Moscow taking part in all sort of real-life events. He was joined by the young Alexander Ptushko who helped him creating dolls and sets, and eventually took the director's chair.

By that time, Merkulov had already moved to Gosvoenkino (studio dedicated to military documentaries) where he, Leonid Amalrik and Lev Atamanov started an animation workshop. Their most famous project was The First Cavalry (1929) inspired by the 1st Cavalry Army that fought under Semyon Budyonny during the Russian Civil War. Merkulov became obsessed with it back in 1919 when he heard stories by one of the wounded soldiers. Once again the crew combined live action and animation using various techniques. Eduard Tisse conducted the complex cinematography. The film turned a huge success and supported Merkulov's family for several years.

He continued working on documentaries and animated agitprop, although by the mid-1930s he started switching to other projects. As an engineer he constructed amusement rides for the Central Park of Culture and Leisure, including a full-size interactive seaplane model equipped with a shooting range. In 1939, he was put in charge of the first exhibition dedicated to the Soviet Navy that took place in the Central Park. He also worked as a conservator-restorer on the Vorontsov Palace in Crimea and planned to create a Museum of Naval Glory there with a panoramic view, although this never happened. In addition he worked a lot as an artist and drew top-selling agitation posters.

== Late years ==
Merkulov took part in the Great Patriotic War and on his return continued the art career. Only during the 1950s, he turned back to cinema. Between 1955 and 1965, he created animated sequences for many live action movies, including the science fiction film I Was a Satellite of the Sun (1959) and Grigori Aleksandrov's Russian Souvenir (1960). He also directed several propaganda animated shorts similar to those he had been involved back in the 1920s, such as Prosecute Bread Thieves! (1965), although there was no demand for it anymore. In addition he played episodic roles of Russian noblemen and landlords in historical dramas: his aristocratic appearance attracted film directors.

Yuri Merkulov died in 1979 and was buried in the family tomb at the Novodevichy Cemetery. He was married to Antonina Vasilievna Merkulova whom he met in Crimea. They had a daughter Nina.

== Literature ==
- Cinema: Encyclopedic Dictionary // main editor Sergei Yutkevich (1987). — Moscow: Soviet Encyclopedia, p. 265
- Olga Nesterovich (1971). Life in Cinema. Veterans about Themselves and Their Friends. — Moscow: Iskusstvo, p. 124
- Yuri Merkulov (1928). Something about Bratishkin. — Soviet Screen № 49 ISSN 0132-0742
- Ivan Ivanov-Vano (1980). Frame After Frame. — Moscow: Iskusstvo, p. 17-23, 54-60

== See also ==
- History of Russian animation
