= Interplanetary Revolution =

1924 Soviet animated short film

Interplanetary Revolution

Interplanetary Revolution (Russian: Межпланетная революция) (Note: Subtitled "Сказ о том, как красный воин Коминтернов за буржуями летал и на Марсе на планете всех буржуев разогнал", "The skaz of how the red warrior Kominternov flew after the bourgeoisie and dispersed all the bourgeoisie on the planet Mars". The subtitle is written in the rhymed style of Russian folk narratives.) is one of the first Soviet animated films, shot in 1924. A production of the experimental animation workshop set up by the authors. (Note: Some sources claim the workshop was set up under the auspices of the State Technical College of Cinematography (now VGIK) and the film was a coproduction with the Mezhrabpom-Rus studio. while the film itself credits the production to "бюро гос.тех.кино" (GosTekhKino bureau) and the studio was claimed elsewhere to be under the auspices of Gostekhkino, housed at the premises of the former Moscow restaurant "Yar".)

The 8-minute black and white silent animated short was directed and written by Nikolai Khodataev, Zenon Komissarenko and Yuri Merkulov.

== Background ==
In 1924, Vasily Zhuravlev published the screenplay The Conquest of the Moon by Mr. Fox and Mr. Trott, which later formed the basis for Interplanetary Revolution by directors Nikolai Khodatayev, Zenon Komissarenko and Yuri Merkulov, also students of the State Television and Radio Broadcasting Company. The cartoon was created as animated inserts for the science fiction film Aelita by Yakov Protazanov. However, in the end it was not included in it and was released separately as a parody in the same year, but was not shown in theatres.

== Plot ==
Frightened by the advance of the proletariat across planet Earth, the bourgeoisie of all countries fly into space in a spaceship resembling a shoe in the hope of saving themselves and the plundered capital, but they are eventually swallowed by the sun. The "red warrior kommissar Kominternov" (красный воин комиссар Коминтернов) follows them, but he lands on a futuristic Mars, where he fosters a victorious proletarian revolution.

== Analysis ==
The animation is of primitive cutout style, with almost no intertitles. The film is made of cliches: it shows a bourgeois with buldog's heads with an axe wearing a top hat under which a swastika is hidden, vampires in tailcoats with swastikas on their foreheads who suck the blood of a worker. Their hair stands on end from the newspaper "Pravda", etc.

Polish historian Andrzej Zawistowski notices that one uniformed character with moustache closely resembles Polish marshal Pilsudski.

Not only the images of capitalists, but the communists as well were parodied. The propaganda in the film is described as extremely cliched and straightforward (but probably only from the modern point of view).

The filmmakers seem to poke some fun at Aelita: Kominternov sees a man and a woman on the Moon kissing.
