= The Chelsea Symphony =

Orchestra in New York City (founded 2005)

- Orchestra
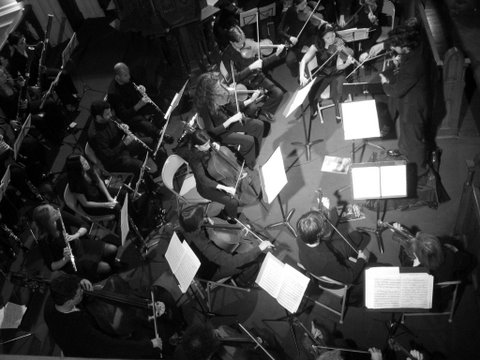
- The Chelsea Symphony in 2006
- Former name: The City Orchestra of New York
- Founded: 2005
- Location: Chelsea, Manhattan, New York City, U.S.
- Website: www.chelseasymphony.org

The Chelsea Symphony is an orchestra noted for its uniquely fluid hierarchy. Based in New York City, The Chelsea Symphony's members rotate as the ensemble's own conductors, composers, and soloists. Each season, every conductor conducts a complete symphonic program with the group, each composer has a new work performed by the full orchestra, and every soloist performs a featured piece with the entire ensemble. The Chelsea Symphony gives most of its concerts at the German Church of St. Paul's.

== Founding and First Concerts ==
Founded in November 2005 by Miguel Campos Neto and Yaniv Segal, the orchestra was originally called The City Orchestra of New York, but later changed its name to The Chelsea Symphony after establishing itself as the resident orchestra of Chelsea, Manhattan. The orchestra gave its first concert (as The City Orchestra of New York) on May 20, 2006, at the German Church of St. Paul's. The concert featured conductors Ankush Bahl, Miguel Campos Neto, Avlana Eisenberg, Geoffrey Robson, and Yaniv Segal; soloists Greg Giannascoli (marimba) and Michael Ludwig (violin); and composer Aaron Dai.

The orchestra gave its first concerts as The Chelsea Symphony on September 9 and 10, 2006, at St. Peter's Church, Chelsea, and the German Church of St. Paul's, respectively. The concert cycle featured conductors Geoffrey Robson and Ben Rous; soloists Adam Hollander (oboe) and Hugo Moreno (trumpet); and composer Ryan Chase.
