= Christmas Eve (opera) =

Opera by Nikolai Rimsky-Korsakov

- Opera by Nikolai Rimsky-Korsakov
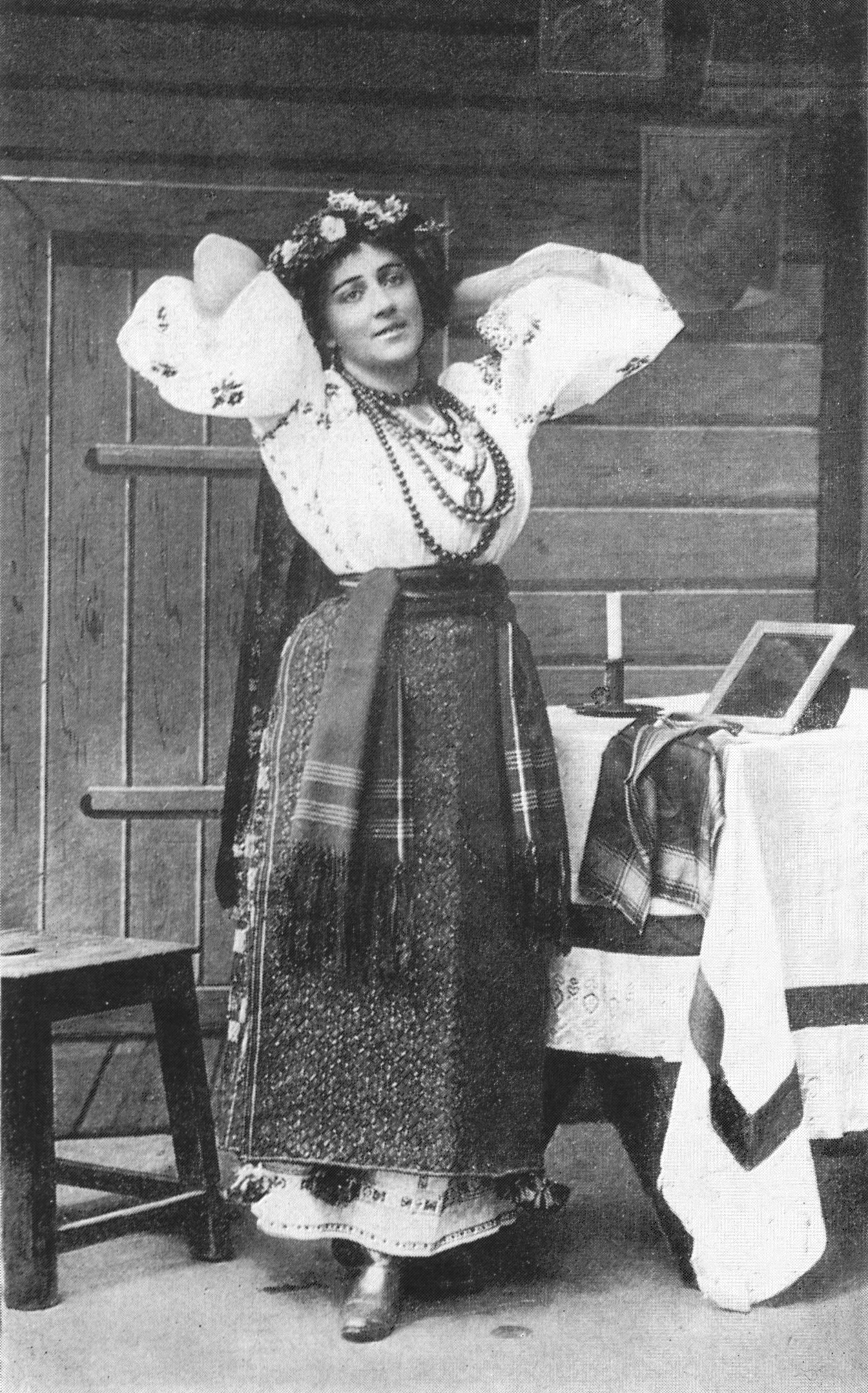
- Yevgeniya Mravina as Oksana in the premiere
- Native title: Russian: Ночь перед Рождеством
- Librettist: Rimsky-Korsakov
- Language: Russian
- Based on: "Christmas Eve" by Nikolai Gogol
- Premiere: 1895; Mariinsky Theatre, St. Petersburg

Christmas Eve or The Night Before Christmas (Russian: Ночь перед Рождеством, romanized: Nóch péred Rozhdestvóm) (Note: The BGN/PCGN system is used here. ISO 9: Noč péred Roždestvóm. pronounced [ˈnot͡ɕ ˈpʲerʲɪt rəʐdʲɪˈstvom]) is an opera in four acts with music and libretto by Nikolai Rimsky-Korsakov. Composed between 1894 and 1895, Rimsky-Korsakov based his opera on a short story, "Christmas Eve", from Nikolai Gogol's 1832 collection Evenings on a Farm Near Dikanka. The story had been used as the basis for an opera at least three times previously, including for Tchaikovsky's Vakula the Smith (1874). Oliver Knussen writes that "Rimsky is only interested in recreating the atmosphere of the folk-tale, fleshing it out for his stage pageant in a comparable way to Humperdinck in Hansel. Gerald Abraham, on the other hand, praises the vivid humanity and humour of Rimsky's setting, as well as its atmospheric strength.

== Performance history ==
The premiere took place on 10 December 1895 at the Mariinsky Theatre in St. Petersburg.

The British premiere was in 1988 in London, at the English National Opera; it was conducted by Albert Rosen.

It was revived at the Oper Frankfurt in 2022 in a production that was recorded, directed by Christof Loy and conducted by Sebastian Weigle. It was chosen performance of the year by the critics of Opernwelt and has remained the Christmas offer at the house, then conducted by Takeshi Moriuchi.

== Roles ==
Role	Voice type	Premiere cast Mariinsky Theatre, St. Petersburg 10 December 1895 (Conductor: Eduard Nápravník)
Tsaritsa	mezzo-soprano	Maria-Vilgelmina Piltz
Village-head	baritone	Vladimir Mayboroda
Chub, an elderly Cossack	bass	Mikhail Koryakin
Oksana, his daughter	soprano	Yevgeniya Mravina
Solokha, a widow, and by rumor, a witch	contralto	Mariya Kamenskaya
Vakula the smith, her son	tenor	Ivan Yershov
Panas, a crony of Chub	bass	Fyodor Stravinsky
Deacon Osip Nikiforovich	tenor	Grigoriy Ugrinovich
Patsyuk, an old Zaporozhets, a sorcerer	bass	Nikolay Klimov
Devil	tenor	Mitrofan Chuprīnnikov
Chorus, silent roles: Lasses, lads, Cossacks of Dikanka. Witches, wizards, evil and good spirits. The figures of Kolyada and Ovsen. The morning star (Venus) and other stars. Court gentlemen and ladies. Lackeys

== Synopsis ==
Time: 18th century
Place: The village of Dikanka, Ukraine; mid-air; a royal court

=== Act 1 ===
Tableau 1: Christmas Eve in the hamlet of Dikanka

The widow Solokha agrees to help the Devil steal the moon. The Devil is annoyed with Solokha's son Vakula, who painted an icon mocking him. The Devil decides to create a snowstorm to prevent Vakula from seeing his beloved Oksana. While the storm rages, Solokha rides up to the sky and steals the moon, while the Deacon and Oksana's father, Chub, are unable to find their way.

Tableau 2: Interior of Chub's house

Oksana is alone and lonely at home. She passes through several moods and the music follows her with gradually accelerating tempos. At one point, Vakula enters and watches her admiring herself. She teases him, and he says he loves her, but she replies that she will only marry him if he brings her a pair of the Empress's slippers. Chub comes back out of the storm, and Vakula, not recognizing him and taking him for a rival, chases him out by striking him. Seeing what he has done, Oksana sends Vakula away in a miserable state. Young people from the village come around singing Ukrainian Christmas carols. Oksana realizes she still loves Vakula.

=== Act 2 ===
Tableau 3: Solokha's house

The Devil is just getting cosy at Solokha's hut when in succession the mayor, the priest and Chub arrive to seduce her each hiding in a sack when the next arrives. Vakula hauls the four heavy sacks to his smithy.

Tableau 4: Vakula's smithy

Vakula puts down his sacks. Young men and women, including Oksana, gather singing Kolyadki and having fun. Vakula, however, is bored and dejected. Oksana taunts Vakula one last time about the Tsaritsa's slippers. Vakula gives his farewell to the lads and to Oksana, exclaiming that he will perhaps meet them in another world. He leaves the sacks - from which the four men emerge.

=== Act 3 ===
Tableau 5: Inside Patsyuk's house

Patsyuk makes magic vareniki jump into his mouth. Vakula has come to request assistance from him. Patsyuk advises him that in order to obtain the help of the devil, he must go to the devil. Vakula puts down his sack, and the devil jumps out and tries to get his soul in exchange for Oksana. Vakula, however, grabs him by his neck, and climbs on his back. He forces the devil to fly him to St. Petersburg.

Tableau 6: Space. Moon and stars

We witness the charming "Games and Dances of the Stars". This is followed by the "Diabolical Kolyadka" in which Patsyuk, riding a mortar, and Solokha, on her broom, attempt to stop Vakula. He succeeds, however, in getting through, and the lights of St. Petersburg become visible through the clouds.

Tableau 7: A palace. A sumptuous room, brightly lit

The Devil puts down Vakula in the tsaritsa's court and disappears into the fireplace. Vakula joins a group of Zaporozhian Cossacks who are petitioning the tsaritsa. A chorus sings the tsaritsa's praises in a magnificent polonaise. The tsaritsa addresses the Cossacks. Vakula requests the tsaritsa's boots to the music of a minuet, and his wish is granted because of its unusual and amusing nature. The Devil takes Vakula away as Russian and Cossack dances commence.

Tableau 8: Space. Night

Vakula returns home on the devil's back. We witness the procession of Kolyada (young girl in a carriage) and Ovsen (boy on a boar's back). On approaching Dikanka, we hear church bells and a choir.

=== Act 4 ===
Tableau 9: Christmas Day. Courtyard beside Chub's house

Oksana listens to some women exchanging gossip about Vakula, who is believed to have committed suicide. Alone, Oksana sings an aria expressing her regret that she had treated Vakula harshly, and wishing for his return. He appears with the boots, followed by Chub. Vakula asks Chub for Oksana's hand in marriage and Chub assents. Vakula and Oksana sing a duet. Other characters enter and ask Vakula about his disappearance.

Epilogue: In memory of Gogol

Vakula announces that he will relate his story to the beekeeper Panko the Gingerhead (i.e., Gogol), who will write a story of Christmas Eve. There is general rejoicing.

== Principal arias and numbers ==
Introduction

Act 1
Act 2
Act 3

Scene 2

Introduction
Games and dances of the stars
1. Mazurka
2. Procession of the Comet
3. Khorovod
4. Csárdás and shower of shooting stars
Diabolic Kolyadka

Scene 3

Polonaise with chorus

Act 4

== Related works ==
An orchestral suite from the opera of 1904 consists of the introduction to the opera ('Holy Night'), Flight of Vakula, moon and stars, Polonaise, and return flight of Vakula and Christmas morning bells.

- Lysenko: the opera Christmas Eve (1872)
- Tchaikovsky: the opera Vakula the Smith (1874)
- Tchaikovsky: the opera Cherevichki (The Slippers) (1885, a revision of Vakula the Smith)

Lysenko's and Rimsky-Korsakov's Christmas Eve operas and Tchaikovsky's Vakula the Smith/Cherevichki are all based on the same story by Gogol.

== Recordings ==
Audio Recordings (Mainly studio recordings) Source: www.operadis-opera-discography.org.uk

- 1948, Natalya Shpiller (Oksana), Lyudmila Ivanovna Legostayeva (Tsaritsa), Nina Kulagina (Solokha), Dmitriy Tarkhov (Vakula), Pavel Pontryagin (Devil), Sergey Migay (Village-Head), Sergey Krasovsky (Chub), Vsevolod Tyutyunnik (Panas), Aleksey Korolyov (Patsyuk), Sergey Streltsov (Sacristan). Moscow Radio Symphony Orchestra, Moscow Radio Chorus, Nikolai Golovanov.
- 1990, La Nuit de Noël Yekaterina Kudryavchenko (Oxana), Yelena Zaremba (Solokha), Vladimir Bogachov (Vakula), Stanislav Suleymanov (Chub), Maksim Mikhaylov (Panas), Vyacheslav Verestnikov (Village-Head), Vyacheslav Voynarovsky (Devil), Alexey Maslennikov (Sacristan), Boris Beyko (Patsyuk), Olga Tiruchnova (Tsaritsa) Moscow Forum Theatre, Yurlov Academic Choir, Michail Jurowski. Le Chant Du Monde Saison Russe LDC 288001/2 sung in Russian with English and French libretto.
- 2022, (Blu-Ray) Georgy Vasiliev, Julia Muzychenko, Enkelejda Shkoza, Aleksei Tikhomirov, Andrei Popov, Chor der Oper Frankfurt, Frankfurter Opern- und Museumsorchester, Sebastian Weigle (conductor), Christof Loy (stage director), Naxos Blu-Ray, released 11/2022

== See also ==
- List of Christmas operas
