= The Night Before Christmas (1913 film) =

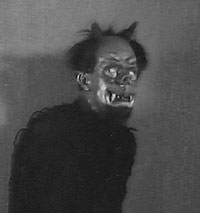
- Ivan Mozzhukhin as the demon
- Directed by: Ladislas Starevich
- Written by: Nikolai Gogol (story); Ladislas Starevich
- Starring: Ivan Mozzhukhin; Olga Obolenskaya; Lidiya Tridenskaya; P. Lopukhin
- Cinematography: Ladislas Starevich
- Release date: 26 December 1913 (Russian Empire)
- Running time: 41 minutes
- Country: Russian Empire
- Languages: Silent film Russian intertitles

The Night Before Christmas.

The Night Before Christmas (Russian: Ночь передъ Рождествомъ, Noch pered Rozhdestvom) is a 1913 silent film made in the Russian Empire by Ladislas Starevich, based on the 1832 tale of the same name by Nikolai Gogol. Unlike most of Starevich's films, it is mainly live-action.

== Plot ==
The plot is, on the whole, close to Gogol's classic tale.

The action is set in a Ukrainian village. On Christmas Eve, a minor demon arrives to a local witch called Solokha. They both ride on the witch's broom, after which the demon steals the Moon and hides in an old rag. In the ensuing darkness, some inebriated Cossacks can't find their way to a shinok (tavern) and decide to go home. One by one, they each come to visit Soloha, who hides each one (starting from the demon) in bags so that none of them see each other. At the same time, Solokha's son Vakula the Metalsmith (P. Lopukhin), tries to woo the beauty Oksana (Olga Obolenskaya), but she laughs at him and demands that he find her the shoes which the Tsarina wears. Vakula goes to Soloha in sadness, but upon coming there sees the bags and decides to take them to the forge. Getting tired along the way, he leaves the heaviest bags on the street, which are picked up by a caroling company. Vakula, who is left only with the bag containing the demon, goes to Patsyuk, a sorcerer, to ask him how to find a demon - only with the help of a demon can he hope to get Tsarina's shoes.

The Patsyuk answers that a person should not search for a demon if he has a demon behind his back. Vakula takes it as some kind of a murky wise say, but indeed eventually finds the demon in the bag and forces him to take him to St. Petersburg. There, Prince Potemkin takes him for an ambassador of the Zaporozhian Cossacks and gives him Tsarina's shoes. The demon takes Vakula home and Vakula lets him go. Oksana agrees to marry Vakula.

== Cast ==
- Ivan Mozzhukhin as Devil (as Ivan Mosjoukine)
- Olga Obolenskaya as Oksana
- Lidiya Tridenskaya as Solokha
- Petr Lopukhin as Vakula (as P. Laphukin)
- Aleksandr Kheruvimov as Golova
- Pavel Knorr as Chub
- S. Sorin

== Significance ==
- The first time that an adaptation of The Night Before Christmas was filmed which was true to the letter and spirit of the original.
- In this film Ladislas Starevich combined in one scene live action and stop motion animation. This occurs in the scene with the hopping galushkis at Patsyuk's place, and in the scene where the demon shrinks and hides in Vakula's pocket.

== Critical reaction ==
From the journal "Kino-theatre and life" («Кино-театр и жизнь», 1913, № 2):

"The Night Before Christmas" (after Gogol) is a very well written and acted cinema piece; however, not without some deficiencies in the scenes of crowds. Of all artists, who by-and-large performed well, it is impossible not to distinguish the makeup and acting of Mr. Mozzhukhin in the role of the demon. The fantastic sections of Soloha's flight on a broom and Vakula's on the demon are not carried off well, but the spectacular trick of the demon's shrinking was skillfully done. This picture will have success in Russia as a live illustration to the work of literature well- known to all the Russian public.

From the journal "Cinematography news" («Вестник кинематографии», 1913, № 24):

Some scenes - such as, e.g., the scene at Soloha's, meeting the Stanitsa Head fetched out of the bag by Chub (a Cossack), Patsyuk's dinner and many others - shine with distinctively Gogolian humour and play over the incessant laughter of the public... The film is made excellently, including the minute details which create the reality of the Ukrainian life.

== See also ==
- History of Russian animation
- List of stop-motion films
- The Night Before Christmas (1951 film)
