= Konstantinovsk =

Town in Rostov Oblast, Russia

Konstantinovsk Константиновск
- Town
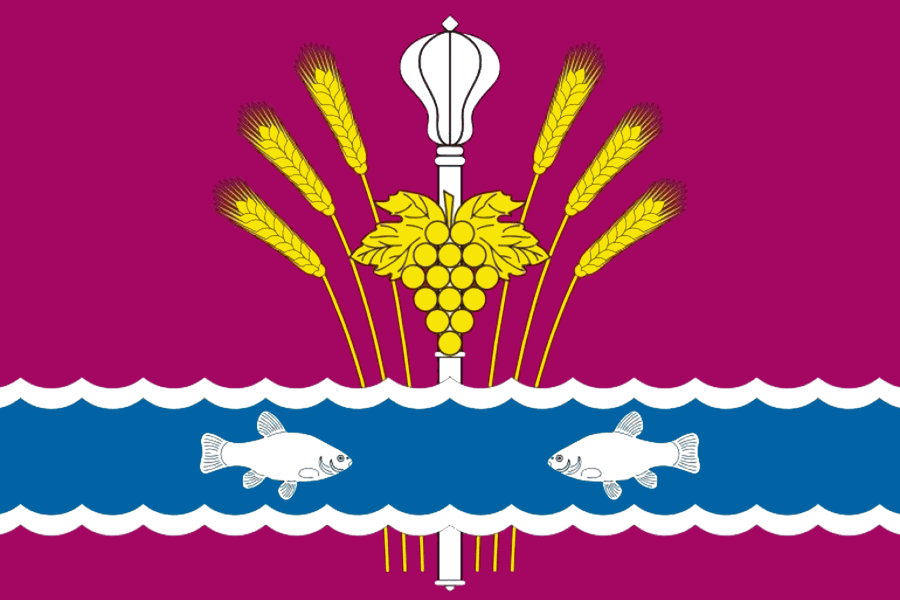
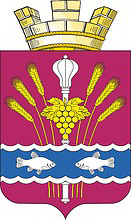
- Flag Coat of arms
- Interactive map of Konstantinovsk
- Location of Konstantinovsk Konstantinovsk (Rostov Oblast)
- Coordinates: 47°34′N 41°05′E
- Country: Russia
- Federal subject: Rostov Oblast
- Administrative district: Konstantinovsky District
- Urban settlementSelsoviet: Konstantinovskoye
- Founded: 1864
- Town status since: 1967
- Elevation: 40 m (130 ft)

Population (2010 Census)
  - Total: 17,926
  - Estimate (2021): 17,207 (−4%)

Administrative status
  - Capital of: Konstantinovsky District, Konstantinovskoye Urban Settlement

Municipal status
  - Municipal district: Konstantinovsky Municipal District
  - Urban settlement: Konstantinovskoye Urban Settlement
  - Capital of: Konstantinovsky Municipal District, Konstantinovskoye Urban Settlement
- Time zone: UTC+3 (MSK)
- Postal codes: 347250–347254, 347289
- Dialing code: +7 86393
- OKTMO ID: 60625101001
- Website: web.archive.org/web/20140725161044/http://www.stanica-konst.ru/

Konstantinovsk (Russian: Константи́новск) is a town and the administrative center of Konstantinovsky District in Rostov Oblast, Russia, located on the Don River near the Seversky Donets. Population: 17,926 (2010 census); 18,801 (2002 census); 18,392 (1989 Soviet census).

== History ==
Town status was granted to Konstantinovsk in 1967.

== Administrative and municipal status ==
Within the framework of administrative divisions, Konstantinovsk serves as the administrative center of Konstantinovsky District. As an administrative division, it is, together with five rural localities, incorporated within Konstantinovsky District as Konstantinovskoye Urban Settlement. As a municipal division, this administrative unit also has urban settlement status and is a part of Konstantinovsky Municipal District.
