= The Night Before Christmas (1951 film) =

- Directed by: Valentina Brumberg; Zinaida Brumberg
- Written by: Zinaida Brumberg; Mikhail Yanshin; Valentina Brumberg
- Starring: Mikhail Yanshin; Alexei Zhiltsov; Vladimir Gribkov; Vera Maretskaya; Liliya Gritsenko; Nikolai Gritsenko
- Edited by: Valentina Ivanova
- Music by: Nikolai Rimsky-Korsakov
- Release date: January 1, 1951
- Running time: 50 minutes
- Country: Soviet Union
- Language: Russian

The Night Before Christmas (Russian: Ночь пе́ред Рождество́м, Noch pered Rozhdestvom) is a 1951 Russian animated feature film directed by the "grandmothers of the Russian animation", Brumberg sisters, and produced by the Soyuzmultfilm studio in Moscow. The film is based on Nikolai Gogol's 1832 story "The Night Before Christmas".

The animation features heavy use of rotoscoping, known as "Éclair" in the Soviet Union, and is an example of the Socialist-Realist period in Russian animation. The film is in the public domain in Russia and is widely available on numerous Home video and DVD releases, mostly along with other films.

== Plot ==
Action of the animated film happens in Dykanka, in Ukraine. Noticed by nobody, in the sky two are turned: the witch on a sweeper which gathers stars in a sleeve, and the devil who hides moon in a pocket, thinking that the come darkness will keep houses of the rich Cossack the Chub invited to the clerk on kutia and hated to the devil the smith Vakula (who painted a picture of the Last Judgement and the devil on a church wall) won't dare to come to the Chub's daughter Oksana.

The forelock with the godfather isn't known whether to go in such darkness to the clerk, however decide and left. The beauty Oksana stays at home. Vakula comes, but Oksana urges on him. The gone astray Forelock, without godfather, decided to come back home because of the blizzard arranged with the devil knocks at the door. However, having heard the smith, the Forelock decides that got to other hut. The forelock goes to Vakula's mother, Solokha who and is that witch who stole stars from the sky.

To Oksana her girlfriends come. On one of them Oksana notices the cherevichks embroidered by gold (that is shoes) and is proud declares that will marry Vakula if that brings it cherevichks, "which the queen carries". In crowd going round carol-singing the smith again meets Oksana who repeats the promise apropos the cherevichks. From Vakul's grief it decides to be drowned, throws all bags, except the smallest, and runs away.

Having slightly calmed down, Vakula wants to try one more means: he comes to the Zaporozhets to Big-bellied Patsyuk who "is similar to the devil" a little, and receives a confused answer that the devil at it behind shoulders. Anticipating nice production, the devil jumps out from a bag and, having mounted upon the smith's neck, promises to it same night Oksana. The cunning smith, having grasped the devil by a tail and having crossed it, becomes a master of the situation and orders to carry to the devil itself to St. Petersburg, directly to the queen.

Having appeared in St. Petersburg, the smith comes to Zaporozhetses with which got acquainted in the fall when they passed through Dykanka. By means of the devil he achieves that it was taken on reception to the queen. Marveling luxury of the palace and strange painting, the smith appears before the queen and asks from it imperial shoes. Touched by such naiveté, Ekaterina pays attention of Denis Fonvizin standing at some distance to this passage, and Vakule gives shoes.

Having returned, the smith takes out a new cap and a belt from a chest and goes to the Forelock with a request to give for it Oksana. The forelock seduced with gifts and angry with perfidy of Solokha's agrees. It is echoed also by Oksana ready to marry the smith "and without chereviks".

== Creators ==
	English	Russian
Directors	Valentina Brumberg; Zinaida Brumberg	Валентина Брумберг; Зинаида Брумберг
Scenario	Zinaida Brumberg; Mikhail Yanshin; Valentina Brumberg	Зинаида Брумберг; Михаил Яншин; Валентина Брумберг
Art Directors	Nadezhda Stroganova; Pyotr Repkin; Aleksandr Belyakov	Надежда Строганова; Пётр Репкин; Александр Беляков
Composer	Nikolai Rimsky-Korsakov	Николай Римский-Корсаков
Artists	V. Rodzhero; I. Troyanova; O. Gemmerling; Nikolai Petritskiy; K. Malyshev; Y. Tannenberg; V. Valerianova	В. Роджеро; И. Троянова; О. Геммерлинг; Николай Петрицкий; К. Малышев; Е. Танненберг; В. Валерианова
Animators	Nikolay Fyodorov; Roman Kachanov; Boris Meyerovich; Roman Davydov; Y. Kazantseva; Faina Yepifanova; Yelizaveta Komova; I. Bashkova; Grigoriy Kozlov; K. Nikiforov; Tatyana Fyodorova; Valentin Lalayants; Tatyana Taranovich; L. Popov; Konstantin Chikin; Boris Dezhkin; Gennadiy Filippov; Boris Butakov; Fyodor Khitruk; Lidiya Reztsova	Николай Фёдоров; Роман Качанов; Борис Меерович; Роман Давыдов; Е. Казанцева; Фаина Епифанова; Елизавета Комова; И. Башкова; Григорий Козлов; К. Никифоров; Татьяна Фёдорова; Валентин Лалаянц; Татьяна Таранович; Л. Попов; Константин Чикин; Борис Дежкин; Геннадий Филиппов; Борис Бутаков; Фёдор Хитрук; Лидия Резцова
Camera Operators	Nikolai Voinov; Elena Petrova	Николай Воинов; Елена Петрова
Executive Producer	Y. Bliokh	Я. Блиох
Sound Operator	Nikolai Prilutskiy; V. Oranskiy	Николай Прилуцкий; В. Оранский
Voice Actors	Mikhail Yanshin (Chub, the cossack); Alexei Zhiltsov (village head); Vladimir Gribkov (devil); Vera Maretskaya (Solokha, the witch); Liliya Gritsenko (Oksana); Nikolai Gritsenko (Vakula, the smith)	Михаил Яншин (казак Чуб); Алексей Жильцов (голова); Владимир Грибков (чёрт); Вера Марецкая (ведьма Солоха); Лилия Гриценко (Оксана); Николай Гриценко (кузнец Вакула)
Narrator	Alexey Gribov	Алексей Грибов
Editor	Valentina Ivanova	Валентина Иванова

== Video ==
Since the beginning of the 1990s the animated film is released by the film association "Krupnyy Plan" on videotapes. In the mid-nineties the animated film is also released in the VHS collection "The Best Soviet Animated Films" of Studio PRO Video together with other animated films, reissued in 1995 by Soyuz studio on VHS separately.

From the first half of the 2000s the animated film was issued on the disks DVD Soyuz studio, and also entered in one their releases of the collection "Gold Collection of Favourite Animated Films", and in gift editions by New Year and orthodox Christmas.

== See also ==
- History of Russian animation
- List of animated feature films
- The Night Before Christmas (1913 film)
