= Christmas Eve (Gogol) =

Short story by Nikolai Gogol

"Christmas Eve" (Russian: Ночь пе́ред Рождество́м, Noch pered Rozhdestvom, Ukrainian: Ніч перед Різдвом, Nich pered Rizdvom, which literally translates as "The Night Before Christmas") is the first story in the second volume of the 1832 collection Evenings on a Farm Near Dikanka by Nikolai Gogol.

== Plot ==
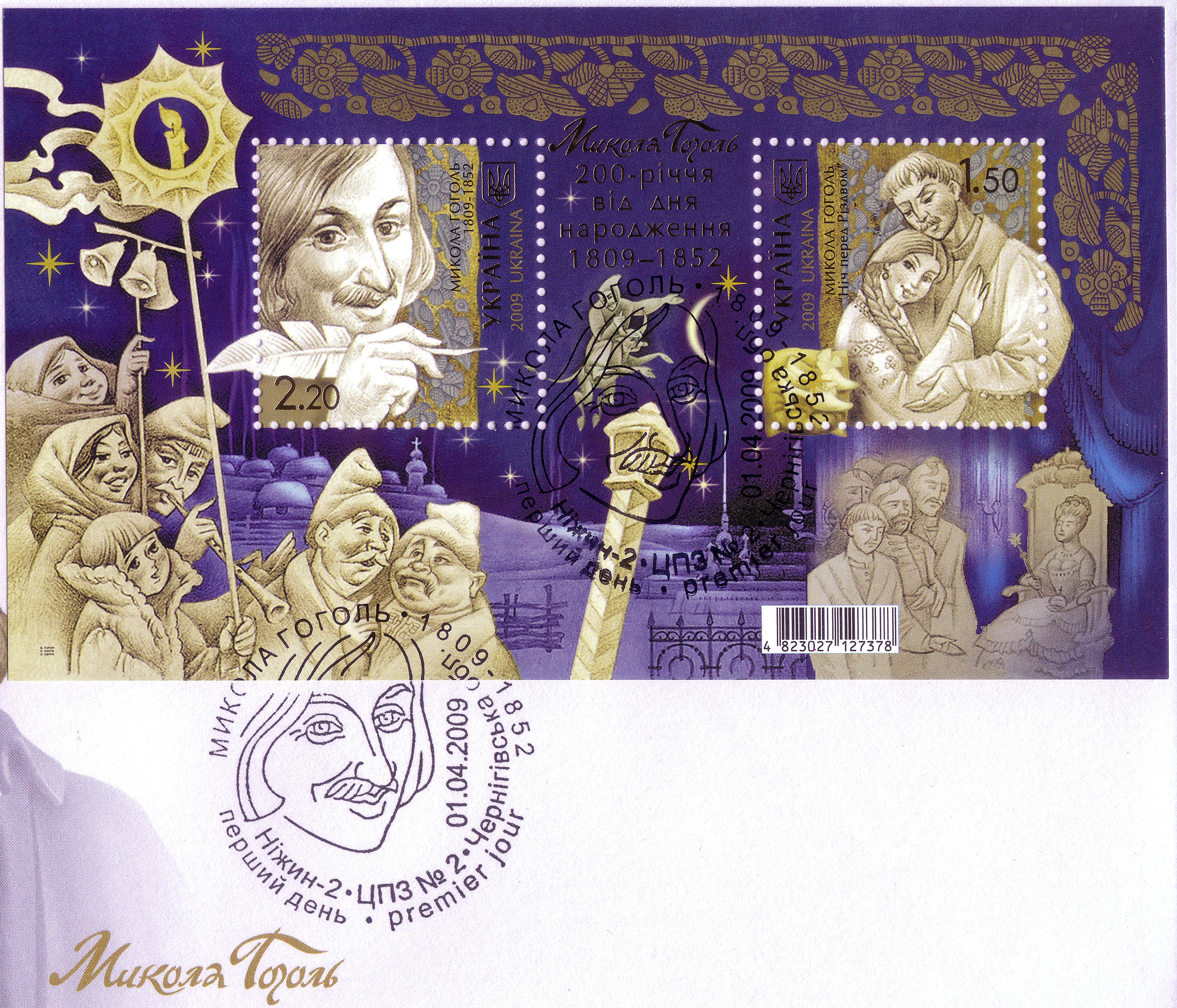
Ukraine (2009): Miniature sheet for the 200th anniversary of N. V. Gogol. Right stamp with the image — "Christmas Eve"

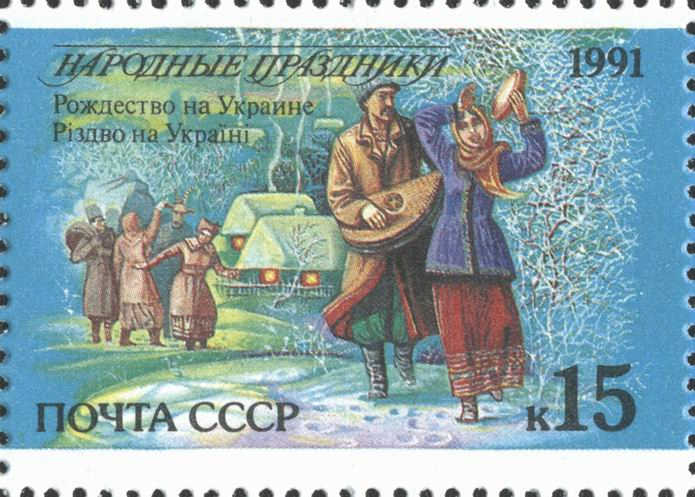
Christmas at Ukraine. Stamp of USSR 1991, series "Folk holiday".

The story opens with a description of the winter scenery of Dikanka, Ukraine, a witch flying across the night sky and the devil stealing the moon and hiding it in his pocket, first playing with it in the sky, which no one in the village notices. Since it is the night before Christmas, the devil is free to roam around and torment people as he pleases, so he decides to find a way to get back at the village blacksmith, Vakula, because he paints religious art in the church.

In the village lives a Cossack named Choub, whose daughter Oksana, an exceptionally beautiful village girl loved by all the young boys, is the object of the blacksmith Vakula’s affection. Choub goes out in the night with his cousin Panas to the sexton’s home gathering, suddenly noticing that the moon is not in the sky. Meanwhile, Vakula is trying to win over Oksana, who mentions that his mother, Solokha, is a witch. Choub and his cousin are suddenly engulfed in a snowstorm started by the devil and lose each other. While his cousin finds his way to the tavern, Choub comes upon his home, but the blacksmith, who is visiting Oksana, answers him. Choub cannot believe that the blacksmith would be in his own house, and concludes it is someone else's house. The blacksmith then sends him away.

When Vakula goes back to Oksana, she tells him she will not marry him unless he can get for her the slippers off the Tsaritsa’s feet. While their discussion is happening, Solokha is with the devil in her home, when someone knocks at the door. She hides the devil in a coal sack and admits her guest but more of her admirers continue to arrive, and when her son Vakula returns she has the Mayor, the sexton and Choub himself hidden in sacks; the latter two were accidentally placed in the same one but remained oblivious to one another. Vakula spots the sacks and carries them to his forge, taking them for coal; their excessive weight makes him think he must have lost his strength, and concludes it had to do with Oksana not loving him. He comes upon Oksana, who again belittles him, and runs off saying goodbye to her, threatening to kill himself.

He decides the only way to win her is to indeed capture the slippers, so he goes to Puzaty Patsyuk, a local Zaporozhian Cossack who is believed to be in league with the devil. Vakula asks him to tell him the way to find the devil while Patsyuk eats magical varenyky that fly down into a basin of cream and then into his mouth, Vakula brushes one aside as it rubs cream on his closed lips. After asking Patsyuk about the devil, he remarks that he cannot give directions to the blacksmith to what is already on his back. Vakula does not understand until he puts down the sacks and the devil hops onto his back. Vakula tricks the devil into thinking he will obey him, then grabs his tail and threatens to use the sign of the cross until he agrees to help.

Fearing the cross, the devil takes him into the sky en route to St. Petersburg, leaving the sacks behind. A group of locals begin to take the bags and discover the men inside, while Vakula goes to find the Tsaritsa. He is amazed by the sights of the city, and has the devil (who shrinks into his pocket) transport him into the palace, where he meets up with a few Zaporozhian Cossacks who are meeting her (i.e., Catherine the Great). When she comes to greet them, the blacksmith appeals to her and glorifies her slippers, which she finds amusing and agrees to give them to him.

In the meantime Oksana gets upset because the villagers have been passing around the rumor that Vakula has killed himself. She knows that Vakula, a good Christian, would not do this, and that night she falls deeply in love with him. She is delighted to see him return and agrees to marry him even before he shows her the slippers. They get married and the story ends with a bishop passing by their beautifully painted house. In the church the blacksmith has made another painting, showing the devil in hell, which villagers spit on and the women bring their frightened children up to say “Look what a kaka (poophead)” (transliterated as: Yaka kaka!)!

== Adaptations ==
- Vakula the Smith (1874 opera by Pyotr Ilyich Tchaikovsky)
- Christmas Eve (1872 opera by Mykola Lysenko, premiered in 1874 in Kyiv)
- Cherevichki (1887 opera by Pyotr Ilyich Tchaikovsky, a revised edition of his Vakula the Smith listed above)
- Christmas Eve (1895 opera by Nikolai Rimsky-Korsakov)
- The Night Before Christmas (1913 film)
- The Night Before Christmas (1951 film)
- The Night Before Christmas (1961 film)
- The Night Before Christmas (1997 film)
- The Little Slippers, a one-act ballet, choreographed by Roman Mykyta using music by Tchaikovsky, originally performed by the Ballet Theatre of Maryland in February, 2022 in Annapolis, MD.

== Literature ==
- Elena Dushechkina. "Christmas Eve" and the Tradition of the Russian Christmastide Story // Gogol's Legacy and Modernity. — 1988. — Part 1. — P. 21-22.
