= List of Christmas operas =

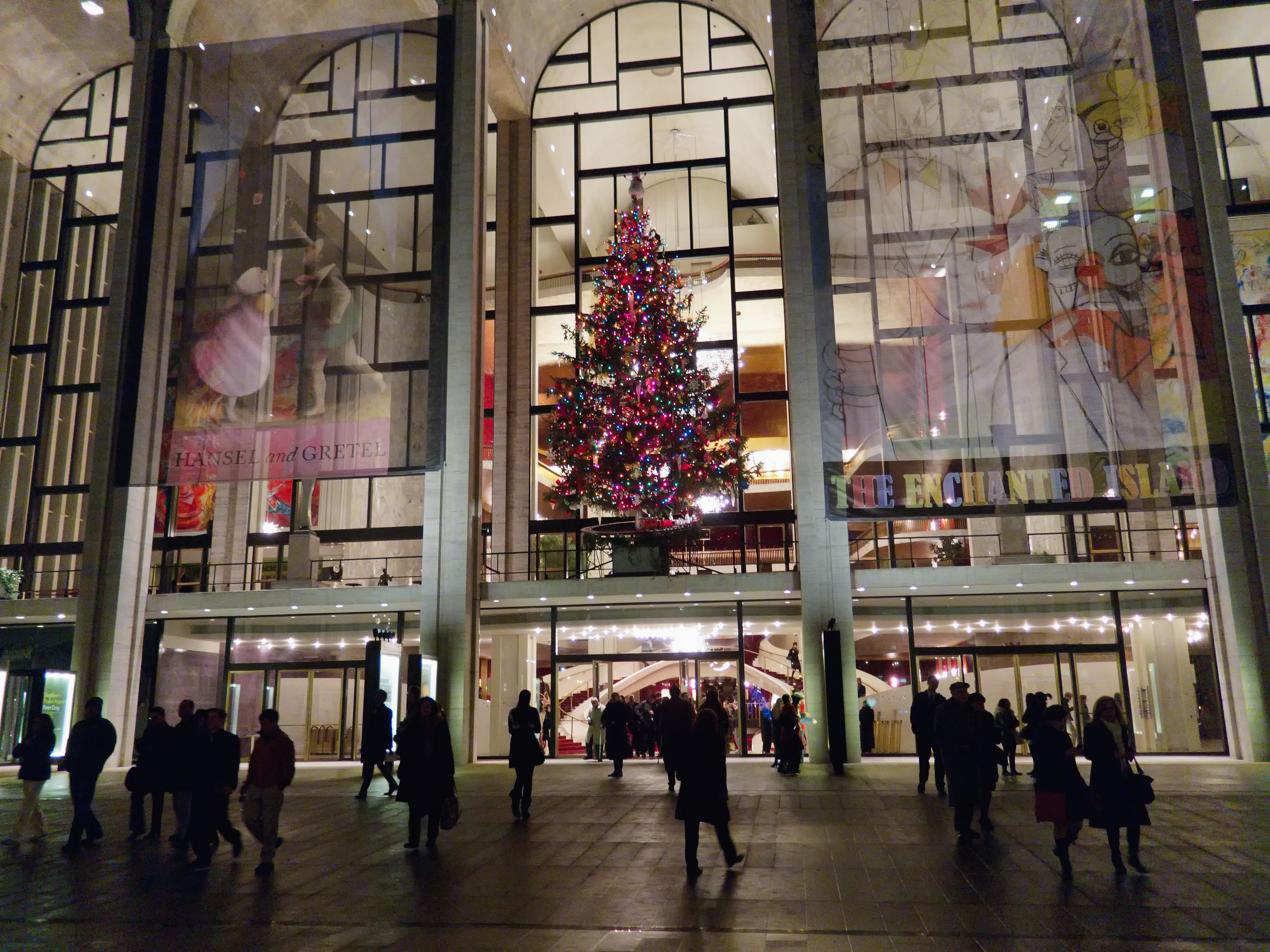
The Metropolitan Opera at Christmas time with a large poster for Humperdinck's opera Hansel and Gretel displayed in the window

Christmas operas are operas which are thematically based on either the Nativity of Jesus or secular Christmas stories. The earliest Christmas operas appeared in the early 17th century, not long after the creation of the art form. Because of the ban on secular theatrical works during the season of Advent, these early Christmas operas, while elaborately staged, were based on religious themes relating to the Nativity. By the mid 19th century the ban on secular operas during Advent had ceased, and operas based on a wider array of Christmas themes, such as Santa Claus and King Wenceslaus, emerged. Several operas have been inspired by Charles Dickens' 1843 novella A Christmas Carol, including works by composers Bernard Herrmann and Thea Musgrave. The story of the Magi has also been the basis of several operas, including Gian Carlo Menotti's 1951 opera Amahl and the Night Visitors. Initially written for television performance, Menotti's opera has become the only modern Christmas opera to earn an enduring place in the live opera performance repertoire. In the 21st century, composer Kevin Puts' Silent Night (2011) achieved critical success and won the Pulitzer Prize for music in 2012.

== History ==
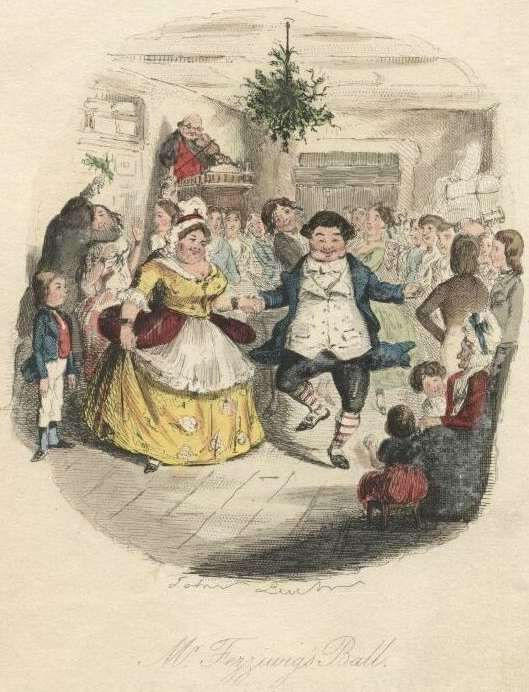
Mr. Fezziwig's Ball, from the first edition of Charles Dickens's 1843 novella A Christmas Carol, the inspiration for numerous Christmas operas

The first Christmas operas, dating from the early 17th century, had librettos based on the Nativity of Jesus and were privately performed. At various times well into the 19th century, public theatres in Italy and other Catholic countries were closed during the season of Advent, the four weeks up to and including Christmas Eve. The opera season customarily recommenced on Saint Stephen's Day, 26 December. Numerous world premieres have taken place in Italy on that day, although all were on secular subjects and unrelated to Christmas. (Note: Among the operas which have premiered in Italy on Saint Stephen's Day are Donizetti's Anna Bolena and Lucrezia Borgia, Bellini's Norma, and Rossini's Aureliano in Palmira.) The prohibition of secular theatrical performances during Advent was to some extent circumvented by the performance of azioni sacre, operas on religious themes, often with elaborate staging. One of the earliest Christmas operas of this type was Giovanni Battista da Gagliano and Jacopo Peri's Il gran natale di Christo salvator nostro (The Great Nativity of Christ, Our Saviour), first performed on Christmas Day 1622.

The second half of the 19th century, when the Advent restrictions were no longer in place, saw new operas on a variety of Christmas themes and usually premiering during the Christmas season, a practice which has continued into the 21st century. Some have been directly based on the Nativity itself or figures closely connected to it such as the Three Magi, while others have focused on Christmas celebrations or traditional figures such as Father Christmas, Knecht Ruprecht, or King Wenceslaus. Nikolai Gogol's short story Christmas Eve has been the inspiration of three Russian language operas: Tchaikovsky's Vakula the Smith (1876) and its revised version Cherevichki (1887), and Nikolai Rimsky-Korsakov's Christmas Eve (1895). At least nine Christmas operas have been based on Charles Dickens's novella, A Christmas Carol, including one in German and one in Italian.

On Christmas Eve 1950 Gian Carlo Menotti's Christmas opera Amahl and the Night Visitors was premiered by the NBC Opera Theater as the inaugural presentation made by the newly created Hallmark Hall of Fame. The first opera written specifically for television, it was immensely popular at its premiere and was dubbed by Life magazine as a Christmas Classic in 1952. Menotti never intended for the work to remain solely confined to the medium of television, and Amahl and the Night Visitors has since been the only Christmas themed opera to become an enduring part of the live opera performance repertory; particularly with smaller opera companies and at colleges and music conservatories. While predominately overlooked by larger opera houses, Amahl has been performed and recorded by The Royal Opera and the Chicago Symphony Orchestra. The success of Menotti's opera is also credited with inspiring the future investment in Christmas specials on American television which resulted in the creation of more than 50 Christmas operas and musicals for that medium.

Although Amahl and the Night Visitors has enjoyed a measure of success, no Christmas opera to date has been able to achieve the same wide popularity as Tchaikovsky's ballet The Nutcracker or Handel's Messiah. Several 21st century composers have attempted to create a popular Christmas work for the opera medium, including Mark Adamo whose Becoming Santa Claus was well received at the Dallas Opera in December 2015. Also successful is John Adams' Christmas opera-oratorio El Niño (2000) which has been semi-staged by several opera companies and orchestras internationally. Of further importance is Kevin Puts' Pulitzer Prize winning opera Silent Night (2011) which has been staged by several American opera companies and by the Wexford Festival Opera in 2014. The original 2011 production of that work by the Minnesota Opera was filmed for the PBS program Great Performances.

While not based on Christmas themes, some operas based on fairy tales or nursery rhymes such as Massenet's Cendrillon, (Note: Cendrillon is particularly popular in France for Christmas performances.) Humperdinck's Hansel and Gretel, and Victor Herbert's Babes in Toyland have been traditionally performed during the Christmas season. Hansel and Gretel, which premiered in Germany on 23 December 1893, has been a Christmas staple at the Metropolitan Opera since 1905. On Christmas Day 1931 it became the first opera to be transmitted live on the radio from the Met. Puccini's La bohème, whose first two acts take place on Christmas Eve, is also frequently presented at some point during the Christmas season, especially at the Metropolitan Opera, London's Royal Opera House, and Opera Australia.

== List of Christmas operas ==
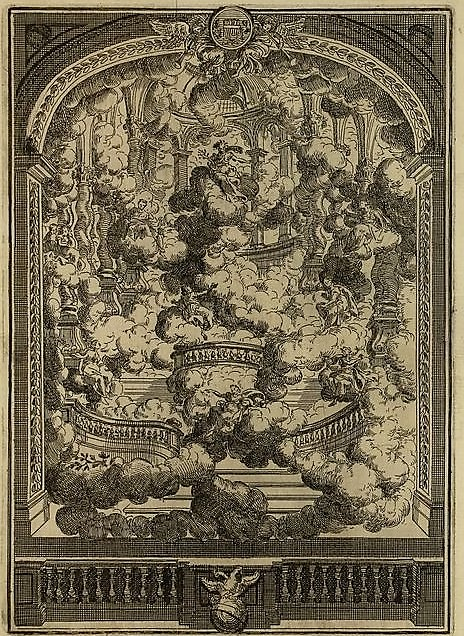
Stage setting for the Prologue of Per la festività del Santo Natale in its first performance (Rome, 1727)

The following is a chronological, but not exhaustive, list of operas with librettos explicitly based on Christmas themes.

=== 17th and 18th centuries ===
- Il gran natale di Christo salvator nostro (The Great Nativity of Christ, Our Saviour), composed by Giovanni Battista da Gagliano (Note: Giovanni Battista da Gagliano (1594–1651) was the younger brother of Marco da Gagliano.) and Jacopo Peri to a libretto by Jacopo Cicognini, (Note: Jacopo Cicognini (1577–1633) was the father of Giacinto Andrea Cicognini.) was first performed on 25 December 1622 in the oratory of the Compagnia dell' Arcangelo Raffaello, Florence. The story is set in the fields outside Bethlehem with a prologue sung by Lucifer. The remaining characters are the shepherd boys Carino and Rosildo; the older shepherd, Licida; the archangels Gabriel and Raphael; and the personifications of Human Nature, Death, Sin, Despair, and Hope. There are two choruses, one of angels and one of shepherds. The work was an expansion of Cigognini's earlier Christmas entertainment for the Compagnia dell' Arcangelo Raffaello, La rappresentazione di pastori (The Representation of the Shepherds) which had been performed on Christmas Day 1617 and again in 1619 and included choruses of angels, some of whom were sitting on clouds as they brought the Star of Bethlehem over a richly decorated nativity scene. Although the music is lost, a copy of the libretto published in 1625 and dedicated to Prince Ladislaus of Poland has survived.
- Per la notte del Santissimo Natale (For the Night of the Most Holy Nativity), composed by Carlo Francesco Cesarini to a libretto by Cambise Bonfranci, was first performed on Christmas 1696 at the Apostolic Palace in Rome. The work has four characters, Lucifer and three allegorical figures: Divine Love, Innocence, and Peace.
- Il genere umano consolato (Humanity Consoled), composed by Quirino Colombani to a libretto by Pompeo Figari, was first performed on Christmas 1704 at the Apostolic Palace in Rome. The work has five characters, all of them allegorical: Mankind, Prophecy, Hope, Time, and Piety.
- Per la festività del Santo Natale (For the Celebration of the Holy Nativity), composed by Giovanni Battista Costanzi to a libretto by Metastasio, was first performed on 2 January 1727 in the private theatre of Cardinal Ottoboni at the Palazzo della Cancelleria in Rome. It was performed for a gathering of the Accademia degli Arcadi and had elaborate sets which included a cloud machine. The work has four characters, a Celestial Spirit who sings the prologue, and three allegorical figures: Faith, Hope, and Divine Love. Metastasio's libretto was subsequently set by several other composers.
- The Christmas Tale, composed by Charles Dibdin to a libretto by David Garrick, premiered on 27 December 1773 at the Drury Lane Theatre in London.
- Die Weihnacht auf dem Lande (Christmas in the Country), a comic Singspiel in three acts composed by Johann Baptist Schenk to a libretto by Peter Wiest, premiered on 14 December 1786 at the Leopoldstädter Theater in Vienna.

=== 19th century ===
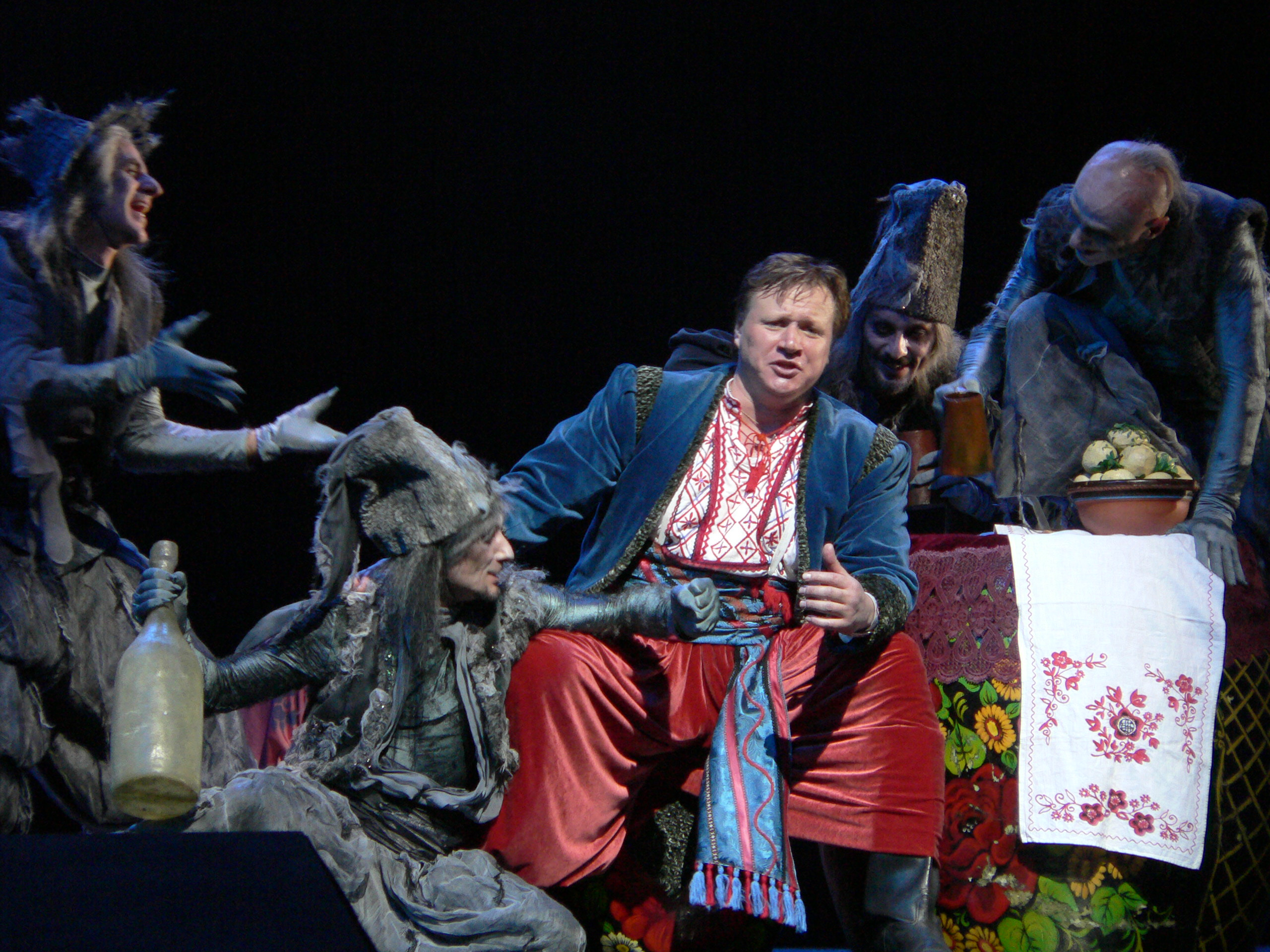
Oleg Videman as Vakula in a 2005 performance of Tchaikovsky's Cherevichki at La Scala, Milan

- El turrón de Nochebuena (The Turrón of Christmas Eve), a zarzuela in one act composed by Cristóbal Oudrid to a libretto by José María Gutiérrez de Alba premiered on 24 December 1847 at the Teatro Variedades in Madrid.
- La nuit de Noël, ou L'anniversaire (Christmas Night, or The Anniversary), a comic opera in three acts composed by Henri Reber to a libretto by Eugène Scribe, premiered on 9 February 1848 at the Théâtre Favart della Comédie-Italienne in Paris. The plot revolves around a gamekeeper and his young wife who constantly quarrel and the machinations of the local baron who seeks to take advantage of the situation. The uproar in the village is resolved by the Lutheran pastor who takes advantage of the local superstition that anyone encountering another on the chapel's steps on Christmas Eve will die in the coming year. He contrives to have the baron locked in the chapel and for the quarreling couple to meet outside. Their fear of impending death leads them to reconcile.
- El pavo de Navidad (The Christmas Turkey), a zarzuela in one act composed by Francisco Asenjo Barbieri to a libretto by Ricardo Puente y Brañas premiered on 24 December 1866 at the Teatro de Variedades in Madrid.
- Vakula the Smith, composed by Pyotr Ilyich Tchaikovsky to a libretto by Yakov Polonsky, premiered on 6 December 1876 at the Mariinsky Theatre. Its libretto is based on Gogol's short story "Christmas Eve".
- Cherevichki (also known as The Tsarina's Slippers) is Tchaikovsky's revised version of his earlier Vakula the Smith, using the libretto by Yakov Polonsky. It premiered on 9 January 1887 at the Bolshoi Theatre in Moscow.
- Noël ou Le mystère de la nativité (Christmas, or The Mystery of the Nativity) four tableaux with music by Paul Vidal and text in verse by Maurice Bouchor was first performed on 25 November 1890 at the Petit-Théâtre des Marionettes de la Galerie Vivienne in Paris/
- Christmas Eve, composed by Nikolai Rimsky-Korsakov who also wrote the libretto, premiered on 10 December 1895 at the Mariinsky Theatre, St. Petersburg. Like Vakula the Smith, its libretto is based on Gogol's short story "Christmas Eve".
- La cena de nochebuena o A caza del gordo (The Christmas Eve Dinner, or In Search of the Fat Man), a sainete in one act composed by Rafael Calleja Gómez to a libretto by Ángel Caamaño Izquierdo premiered on 24 December 1896 at the Teatro Martín in Madrid.

=== 20th century ===
- Ein Weihnachtsmärchenspiel (A Christmas Fairy Tale), composed by Sigwart zu Eulenburg to a libretto by his father Philipp zu Eulenburg writing under the pseudonym "Friedrich Häsens", premiered on 22 December 1900, at the Deutsches Nationaltheater in Hamburg.
- Die Weihnacht (Christmas Night), composed by Alberto Gentili to a libretto by Ferdinando Fontana, premiered on 25 December 1900 in German translation at the Königliches Hof- und Nationaltheater in Munich. Fontana's libretto was based on On di de Natal, an 1876 play in Milanese dialect by Carlo Righetti.
- Yolka (The Christmas Tree), a one-act children's opera composed by Vladimir Rebikov to a libretto by Sergey Plaksin based on Dostoevsky's story "A Christmas Tree and a Wedding", premiered in 1903 in Russia.
- In Knecht Ruprechts Werkstatt (In Knecht Ruprecht's Workshop), composed by Wilhelm Kienzl to a libretto Hildegard Voigt, premiered on 25 December 1907 at the Opernhaus Graz in Austria.
- Noël (Christmas), composed by Frédéric Alfred d'Erlanger to a libretto by Jeanne and Paul Ferrier, premiered on 28 December 1910 at the Opéra-Comique in Paris as a gala performance to benefit the Orphelinat des Arts. This was its only known performance.

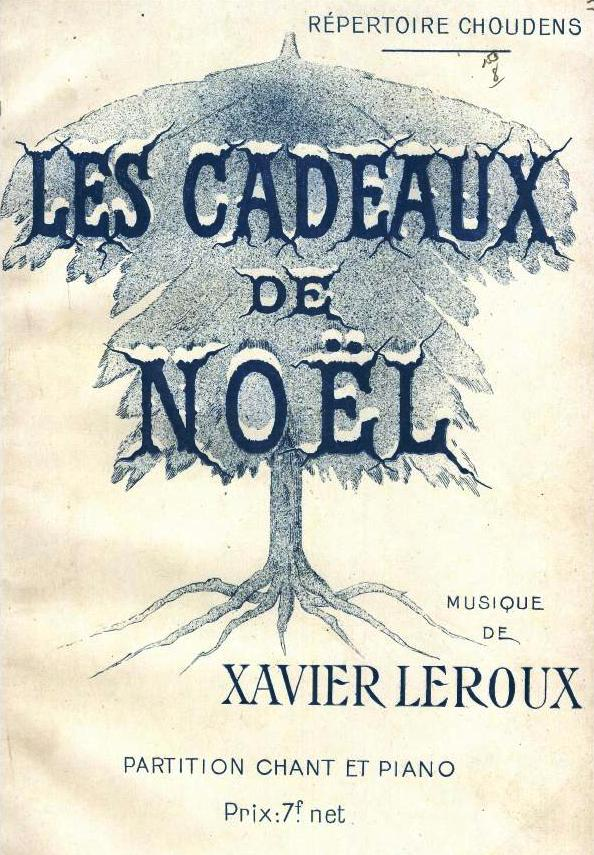
Vocal score for Leroux's opera Les cadeaux de Noël which premiered in Paris on Christmas Day 1915

- Les cadeaux de Noël (The Christmas Gifts), composed by Xavier Leroux to a libretto by Émile Fabre premiered on 25 December 1915 at the Opéra-Comique in Paris.
- Das Christ-Elflein (Christ's Little Elf), composed by Hans Pfitzner to a libretto by Pfitzner and Ilse von Stach, premiered on 11 December 1917 at the Königlich-Sächsisches Hoftheater in Dresden.
- A Christmas Tale, composed by Eleanor Everest Freer to a libretto by Barrett H. Clark premiered on 27 December 1927 in Houston, Texas. Clark's libretto was based on Maurice Bouchor's 1895 French play Conte de Noël.
- Weihnacht (Christmas), a radio opera (also known as Weihnacht 1929), composed by Werner Egk to a libretto by Robert Seitz was first broadcast in 1929 by Bayerischer Rundfunk.
- The Christmas Rose, composed by Frank Bridge to a libretto by Margaret Kemp-Welch and Constance Cotterell based on a children's play, was first performed on 8 December 1931 at the Royal College of Music's Parry Opera Theatre in London. The work was revived in December 1979 in a concert performance by the BBC Welsh Symphony Orchestra and was later recorded by the Chelsea Opera Group.
- Großstadt Weihnacht (Christmas in the Metropolis), a radio opera composed by Werner Egk to a libretto by Robert Seitz was first broadcast in 1931.
- Magyar karácsony (Hungarian Christmas), an opera in one act composed by Jenő Ádám to a libretto by Klára Tüdös, premiered on 22 December 1931 at the Hungarian State Opera House in Budapest.
- Il natale di Gesù (The Birth of Jesus), composed by Franco Vittadini to a libretto by Angiolo Silvio Novaro, premiered on 20 December 1933 at the Teatro Petruzzelli in Bari.
- ...Y mañana Navidad (...And Tomorrow Christmas), a children's zarzuela in one act composed by Manuel Villacañas Sastre to a libretto by Fernández Cuesta, premiered on 25 December 1940 at the Teatro Alcalá in Madrid. The title echoes a recurring phrase in traditional Spanish Christmas carols: "Esta noche es Nochebuena Y mañana Navidad" (Tonight is Christmas Eve and tomorrow Christmas).
- Ceské jeslicky (A Czech Nativity Scene), an opera in three acts with prologue and epilogue composed by Jaroslav Křička to a libretto by Jan Porta and Bohuš Stejskal premiered on 15 January 1949 at the Prague State Opera. The libretto is based on Czech folk plays and traditional Christmas carols. Ceské jeslicky has been revived several times in the Czech republic, including a 2009 performance in Opava.
- Amahl and the Night Visitors, composed by Gian Carlo Menotti who also wrote the libretto, premiered on 24 December 1951 as a live television broadcast for the NBC Opera Theatre. It was the first opera specifically composed for television in America.
- A Christmas Carol, composed by Bernard Herrmann to a libretto by Maxwell Anderson based on Charles Dickens's A Christmas Carol, premiered on 23 December 1954 as a television broadcast on CBS Chrysler Shower of Stars. The cast included the young Marilyn Horne dubbing Sally Fraser who played Belle and the Ghost of Christmas Past. Although billed as a "television opera", its style was closer to that of a musical.
- A Child is Born, composed by Bernard Herrmann to a libretto which he and Maxwell Anderson adapted from Stephen Vincent Benét's blank verse play A Child Is Born, premiered on 23 December 1955 as a broadcast on the CBS Network's General Electric Theater. Although lasting only 30 minutes, A Child is Born was more operatic in style than Herrmann's previous television opera, A Christmas Carol, and had a cast that included two stars of the Metropolitan Opera, Nadine Conner and Theodor Uppman, with the young Harve Presnell in the minor role of Dismas the Thief.
- A Christmas Miracle, a chamber opera composed by Mark Fax to a libretto by Owen Dodson, was first performed on 6 March 1959 at Howard University in Washington, D.C.
- The Nativity According to St. Luke, composed by Randall Thompson, was first performed in Cambridge, Massachusetts on 12 December 1961.
- Christmas Trilogy, three pageant operas composed by John La Montaine who also wrote the librettos based on medieval Christmas plays, the Bible, and the Latin liturgy. They were a commission by the Washington National Cathedral and were all premiered there between 1961 and 1969.
  - Novellis, Novellis premiered 24 December 1961
  - The Shephardes Playe premiered 1 December 1967
  - Erode the Greate premiered 31 December 1969

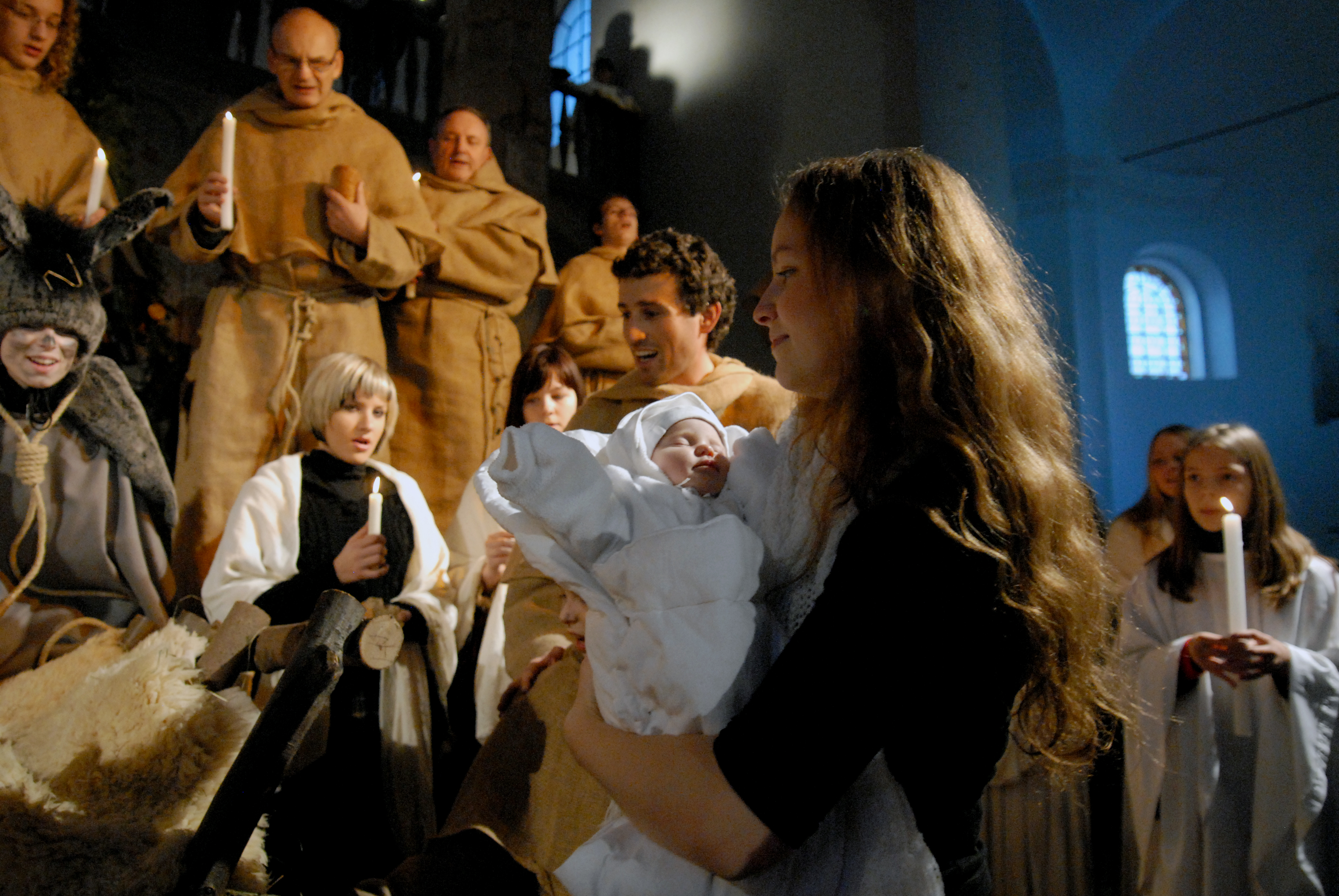
Final scene of Pavel Helebrand's 1996 opera Jesličky svatého Františka (The Nativity Scene of Saint Francis) in one of its many performances in Ostrava

- The Greenfield Christmas Tree, composed by Douglas Moore, premiered on 8 December 1962 in a performance by the Hartford Symphony Orchestra and conductor Fritz Mahler at The Bushnell Center for the Performing Arts.
- A Christmas Carol, composed by Edwin Coleman to a libretto by Margaret Burns Harris based on Charles Dickens's A Christmas Carol, premiered on 24 December 1962 as a broadcast on BBC Television which had commissioned the work. It was also broadcast in the United States in January 1963 on PBS Television. The critic from Variety described the score as "arid and spikey" and unlikely to appeal to general audiences.
- Das lange Weihnachtsmahl, composed by Paul Hindemith with a libretto based on Thornton Wilder's 1931 play The Long Christmas Dinner, premiered on 17 December 1962 in Mannheim, Germany. The English version titled The Long Christmas Dinner was first performed at the Juilliard School of Music in New York on 13 March 1963.
- Abend, Nacht und Morgen (Evening, Night and Morning), an opera in three acts composed by Ján Cikker to a libretto by Cikker, based on Charles Dickens's A Christmas Carol, premiered simultaneously on 5 October 1963 at the Neues Stadttheater am Friedrichsplatz in Kassel and the Slovak National Theatre in Bratislava. It is sometimes known by the alternative title Mr. Scrooge.
- Il canto di Natale (The Christmas Carol), composed by Lino Liviabella to a libretto by Enzo Lucio Murolo based on Dickens's A Christmas Carol, received its first fully staged performance on 14 January 1966 at the Teatro Comunale di Bologna in a double bill with Humperdinck's Hänsel und Gretel.
- The Magi, an opera in one act composed by John La Montaine who also wrote the libretto based on Biblical texts, premiered on 27 December 1967 at the Washington National Cathedral. On that occasion it was paired with La Montaine's The Shephardes Playe (Number 2 in his Christmas Trilogy) which had premiered there earlier that month.
- The First Christmas, an opera in one act by John Antill to a libretto by Pat Flowers, premiered in an ABC television broadcast from Sydney, Australia on 25 December 1969. A commission from the government of New South Wales, it was shown again in December 1970.
- The Business of Good Government, composed by Yale Marshall to a libretto adapted by Wesley Balk from John Arden and Margaretta D'Arcy's 1960 Christmas play of the same name, premiered on 12 December 1970 at the Hennepin Ave. Methodist Church in Minneapolis. While telling the traditional story of the birth of Jesus in Bethlehem, the play and the opera, focus on the problems in Herod's kingdom and his fear that the Three Magi are Persian spies preparing his overthrow. The premiere production was by Center Opera, the predecessor of Minnesota Opera, and combined the work with traditional medieval Christmas songs in a program entitled Christmas Mummeries and Good Government. The opera was performed again on its own the following season.
- A Christmas Carol, composed by Greg Sandow who also wrote the libretto based on Dickens's A Christmas Carol, premiered on 21 December 1977 at the Eastern Opera Theater in Stratford, Connecticut.
- A Christmas Carol, composed by Norman Kay to libretto by John Morgan based on Dickens's A Christmas Carol, premiered on 25 December 1978 as television broadcast by Harlech Television. The role of Ebenezer Scrooge was sung by Geraint Evans.
- A Christmas Carol, composed by Thea Musgrave to a libretto by Musgrave based on Dickens's A Christmas Carol, was premiered on 7 December 1979 by Virginia Opera in Norfolk, Virginia. Its first UK performance was on 14 December 1981 at the Royal Opera House with Frederick Burchinal as Ebenezer Scrooge and was later broadcast on Granada Television.

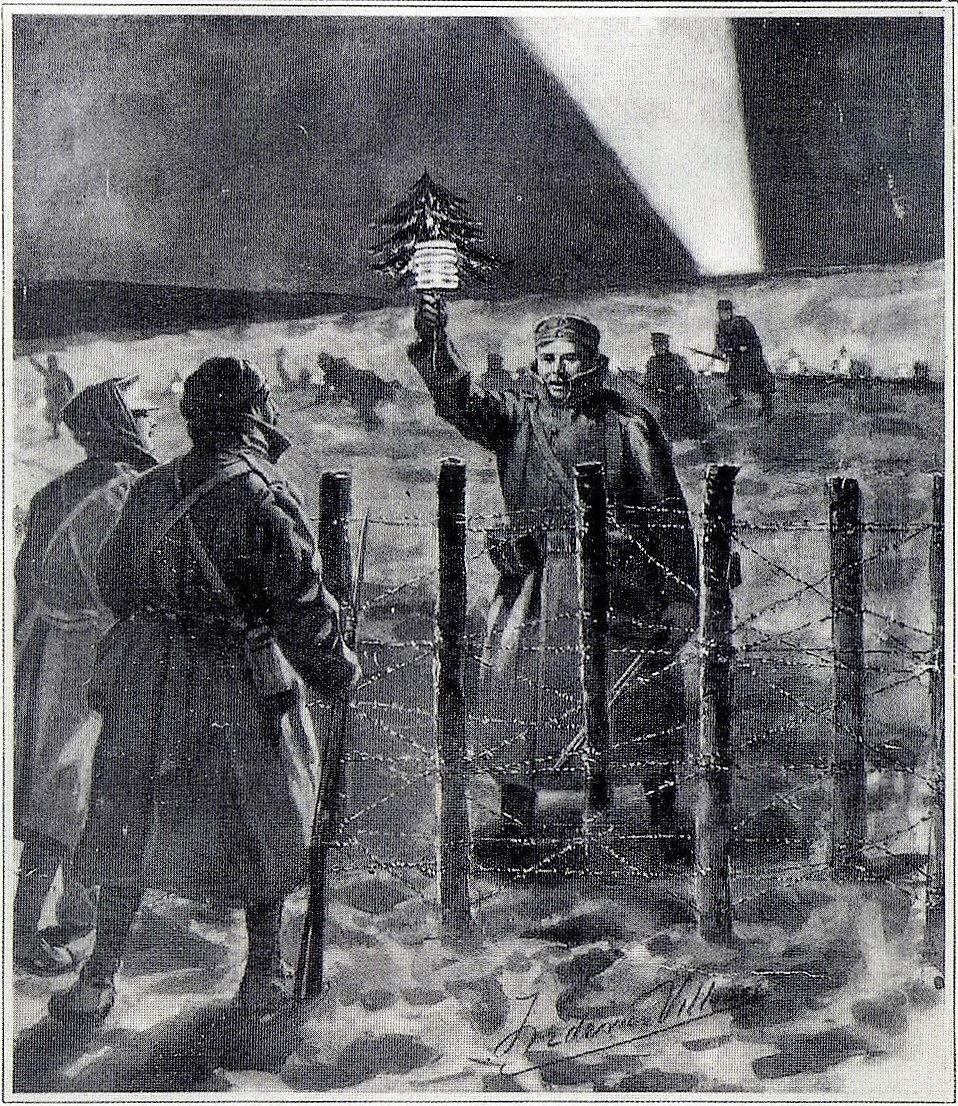
Frederic Villiers' depiction of the 1914 Christmas truce, the setting for Kevin Puts' 2011 opera Silent Night

- Jesličky svatého Františka (The Nativity Scene of Saint Francis), composed by Pavel Helebrand to a libretto by the composer based on the writings of Saint Francis and the poetry of traditional Czech folk theater, was first performed on 12 December 1996 at the Antonín Dvořák Theatre in Ostrava. Since that time, the work has been performed In Ostrava during the Christmas seasons of 2005, 2009, 2012, and 2015.
- Gift of the Magi, composed by David Conte to a libretto by Nicholas Giardini based on O. Henry's 1905 short story "The Gift of the Magi", premiered on 7 December 1997 at the San Francisco Conservatory of Music.

=== 21st century ===
- El Niño, composed by John Adams to a libretto compiled by Adams from biblical texts and poems by a variety of authors. The work premiered on 15 December 2000 at the Théâtre du Châtelet in Paris by the Deutsches Symphonie-Orchester Berlin, the London Voices, the vocal ensemble Theatre of Voices, and conductor Kent Nagano. The premiere production was a semi-staged performance directed by Peter Sellers.
- God Bless Us, Every One!, composed by Thomas Pasatieri to a libretto by Bill Van Horn and Michael Capasso premiered on 16 December 2010 at the Dicapo Opera Theatre in New York City. Its title comes from the final line of Dickens's A Christmas Carol. The libretto takes Dickens's story as its starting point, but sets the action 20 years after the ending of the original story. The opera opens in the offices of Scrooge, Cratchit & Marley on the morning after Scrooge's death. Tiny Tim, now a healthy young man, eventually sails for America to fight on the side of the Union in the American Civil War.
- Silent Night, composed by Kevin Puts to a libretto by Mark Campbell, premiered on 12 November 2011 by Minnesota Opera at the Ordway Theater. The libretto is an adaptation of the screenplay for the 2005 film Joyeux Noël. The opera won the 2012 Pulitzer Prize for Music.
- A Christmas Carol, composed by Iain Bell to a libretto by Simon Callow based on Dickens's A Christmas Carol, premiered on 5 December 2014 at Houston Grand Opera. The work is a 90-minute chamber opera for orchestra and one singer (tenor) in which he portrays multiple characters in the story. The heldentenor Jay Hunter Morris was the singer in the original production, while Mark Le Brocq performed the role in the December 2015 revival by Welsh National Opera.
- Becoming Santa Claus, composed by Mark Adamo who also wrote the libretto, premiered on 4 December 2015 performed by the Dallas Opera at the Winspear Opera House.
- It's a Wonderful Life, composed by Jake Heggie to a libretto by Gene Scheer, premiered on 2 December 2016 at the Houston Grand Opera. The libretto is based on the 1946 Christmas film It's a Wonderful Life.
- The House Without a Christmas Tree, composed by Ricky Ian Gordon to a libretto by Royce Vavrek, premiered on 30 November 2017 at the Houston Grand Opera. It is based on the television film and book The House Without a Christmas Tree by Gail Rock.

== See also ==
- Werther, Massenet's 1892 opera in which the protagonist commits suicide on Christmas Eve as children's voices are heard singing a Christmas carol.
- Gilbert and Sullivan's operas The Sorcerer and Thespis, which were originally staged as Christmas entertainments but whose plots have nothing to do with Christmas itself
- Berlioz's L'enfance du Christ (The Childhood of Christ) which premiered on 10 December 1854 and is often performed at Christmas time. Although composed as an oratorio and intended for concert performance, its libretto contains many of the dramatic elements of an opera as well as stage directions. It has occasionally been given a fully staged performance, most notably in 1911 at the Théâtre de la Monnaie in Brussels.
