= Martin Chodúr =

Czech musician (born 1989)

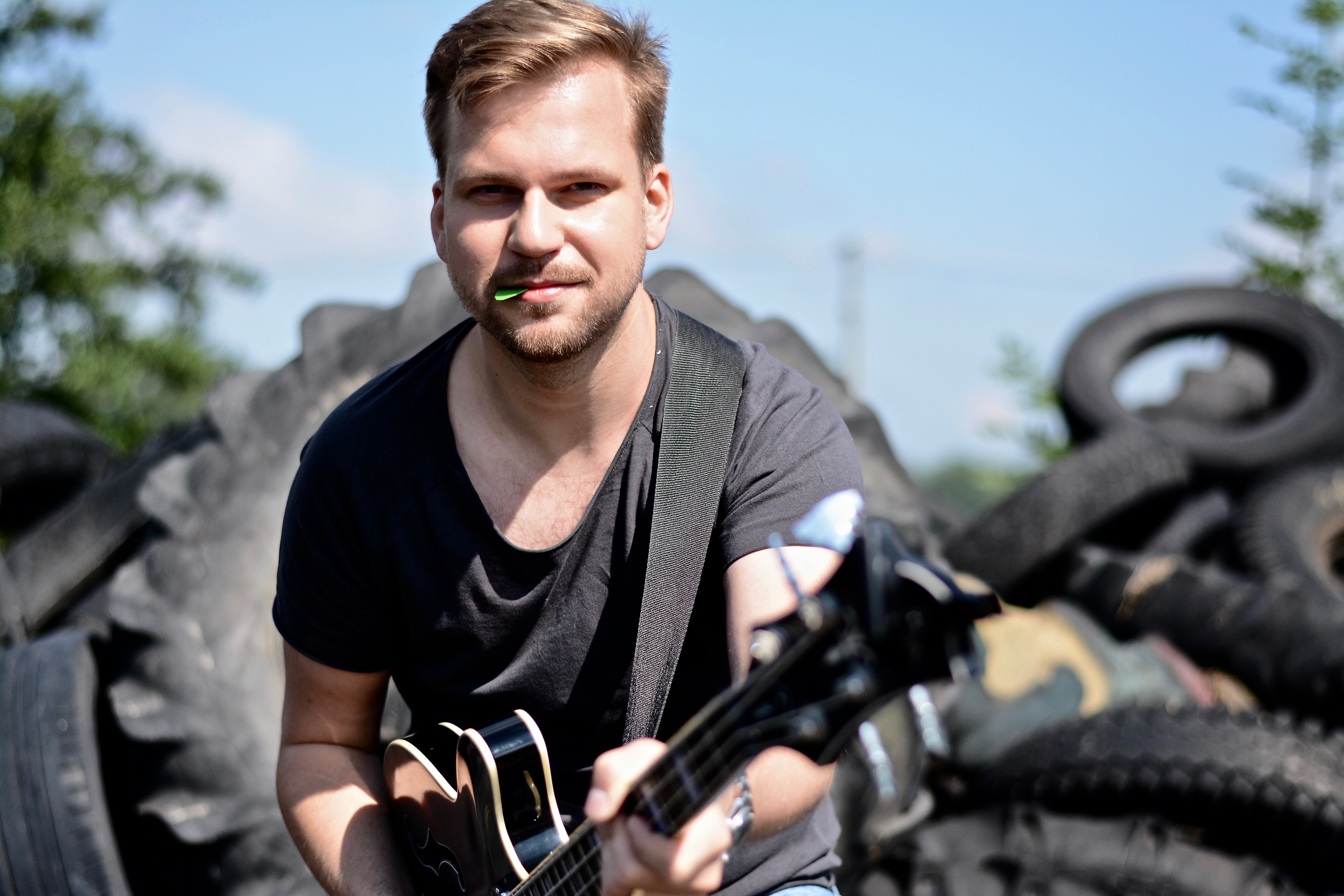
- Chodúr in 2020

Background information
- Born: 24 November 1989 (age 36); Ostrava, Czechoslovakia
- Genres: Pop; rock
- Occupations: Singer-songwriter; musician; composer
- Instruments: Guitar; bass; clarinet; piano; flute; saxophone
- Years active: 2005–present
- Labels: Sony Music; Supraphon
- Formerly of: Robson; Mystic Fable Band
- Website: martinchodur.cz

Martin Chodúr (born 24 November 1989) is a Czech singer, songwriter, and multi-instrumentalist. He won the first season of SuperStar in 2009. He has also won a Český slavík award, several Music Web poll awards, and a TýTý Award, among others.

He has released three studio albums: Let's Celebrate (2010), Manifest (2012), 3 (2015), and one Christmas album, Hallelujah (Vánoční písně a koledy) (2018). Chodúr has also written songs for other Czech musicians, including Karel Gott, Hana Zagorová, Monika Absolonová, Daniel Hůlka, and Štefan Margita.

== Life and career ==
=== 1989–2003: Early life ===
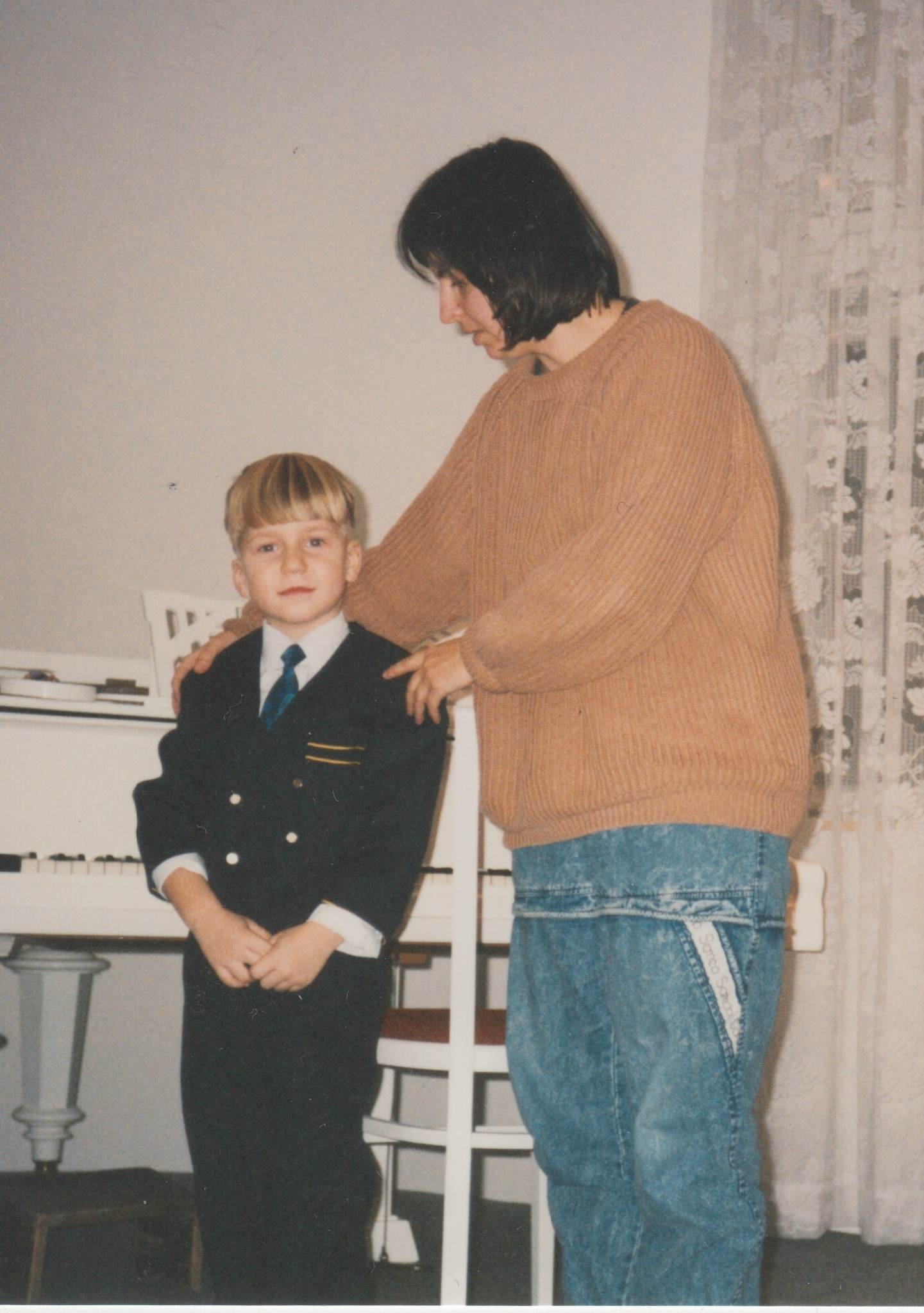
Chodúr and his teacher Eva Krňávková

Chodúr was born in Ostrava, Czechoslovakia. He inherited an appreciation of music from his parents. His grandmother, Božena Onderková-Poremská, had been a member of the opera choir of the provincial theatre in Moravian Ostrava (today's National Moravian-Silesian Theatre) since 1945, and he often sang with his mother, accompanied by guitar.

At the age of three, he began attending the People's Conservatory and the Music School in Ostrava-Mariánské Hory, where he studied singing and recorder. During his twelve years at the conservatory, Chodúr also learned to play the accordion, heligonka, and keyboards. At the same time, he began composing classical music and performed a clarinet concerto as part of his graduation concert.

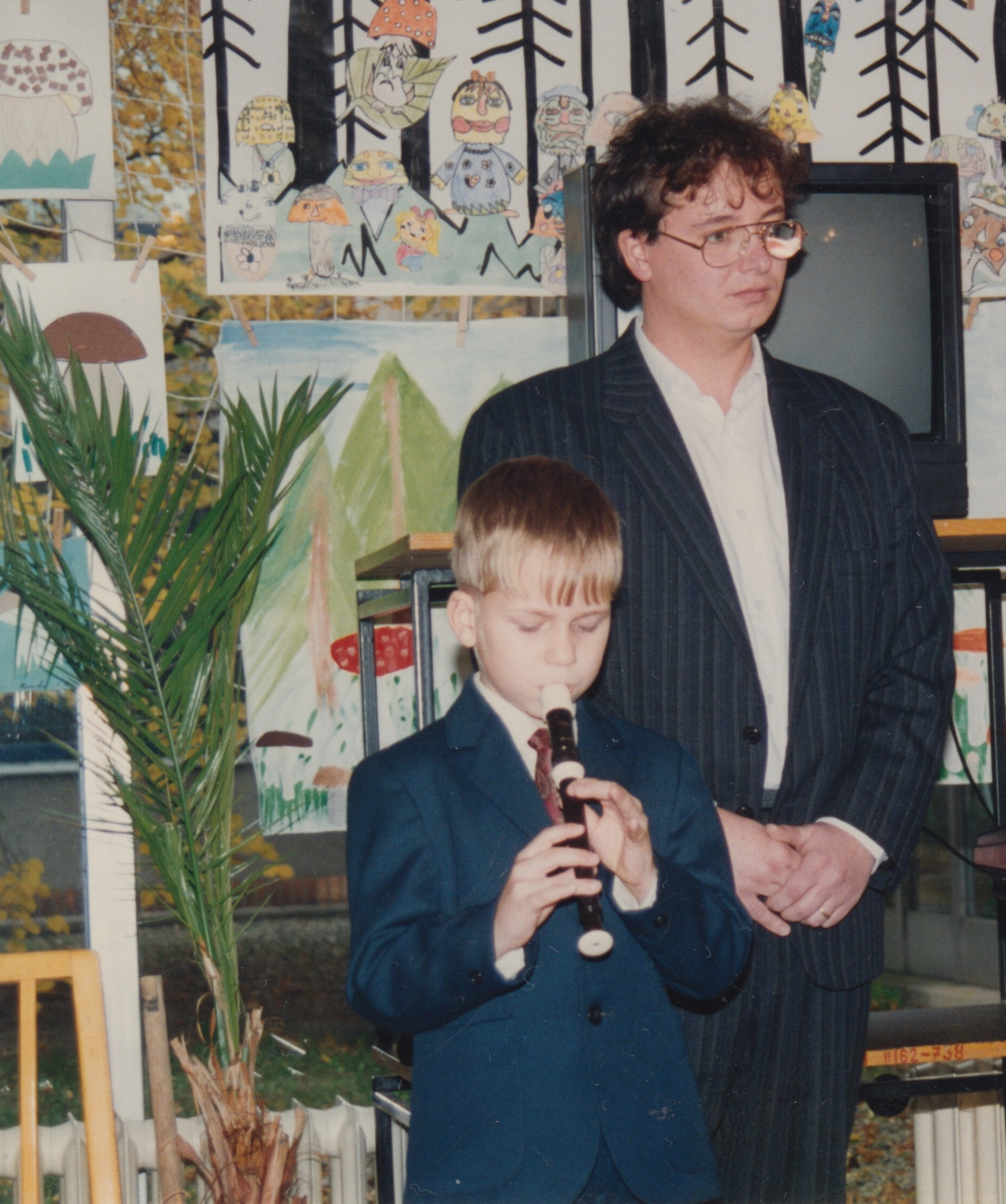
Chodúr and his teacher Mikuláš Ďurko

Chodúr also took private lessons in composition from Ostrava composer Pavel Helebrand. Since childhood, he has also been passionate about poetry, literature, and English. His first published work, a poem called "Joy", appeared in the 2003/2004 Almanac of Student Poetry.

Chodúr's real musical beginnings came when he was eleven years old. The recorder was replaced by a clarinet, which he had begun studying with bass clarinetist Jiří Masný at the Janáček Conservatory and Grammar School in Ostrava. Masný, as a member of the Janáček Philharmonic, collaborated on recording Chodúr's Christmas album Hallelujah (Vánoční písně a koledy). Chodúr had already begun to develop his piano playing in the first year at the Janáček Conservatory, and this became part of his creative process.

During his high school years, Chodúr devoted himself to guitar and singing. He started a group called Eruption of Emotions with drummer Tomáš Novák, who was a classmate of his older brother, Marek. At first, they played as a guitar/vocals and drums duo. Later, guitarist Adam Čermák joined. The group's membership changed frequently, and over the next five years, they changed their name to The Moods and added violin to their lineup. The group played club performances, participated in the music mini-festival Podchodem vstup in Ostrava, and performed at the multi-genre amateur band competition Boom Cup. In addition to participating in his own group, Chodúr also performed as an accompanying bass guitarist and guitar player in the group Mystic Fable, which made it to the Boom Cup 2003 semifinals.

=== 2003–2009: First musical projects ===
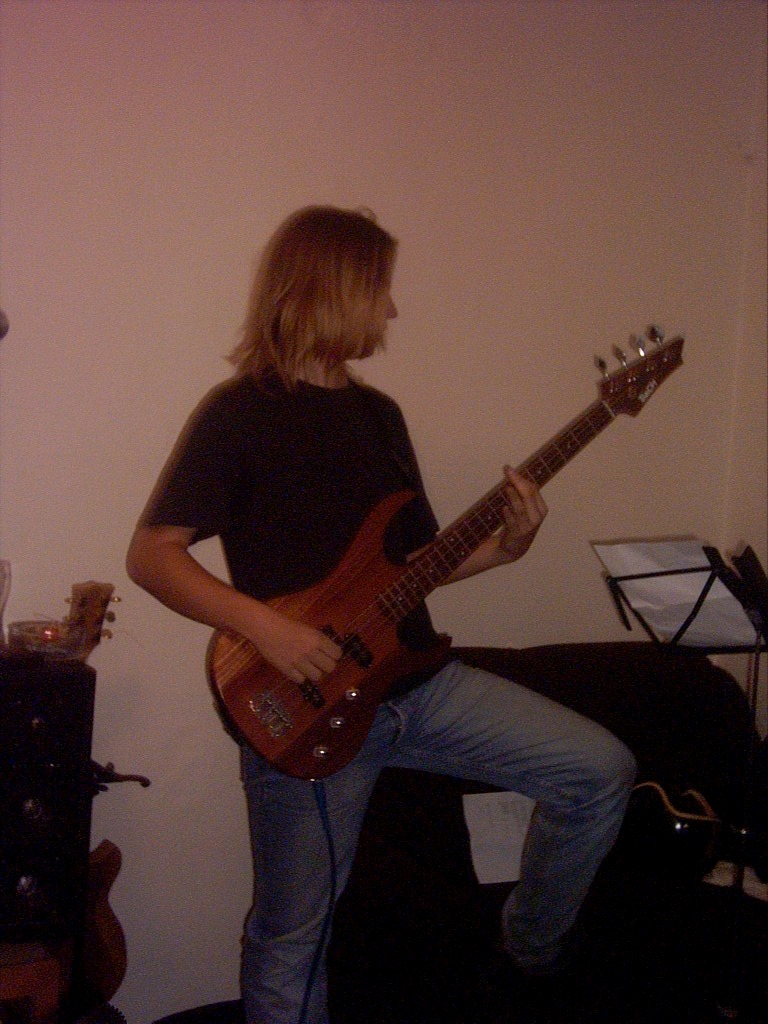
Chodúr as a member of Mystic Fable Band (2003)

In 2003, Chodúr became a member of the band Robson and remained there for five years.

In 2006, the group released an album named Who Is Martin?, which they performed on the Czech Television program Noc s Andělem in 2007. After winning SuperStar in 2009, Chodúr left the band.

=== 2009: SuperStar ===
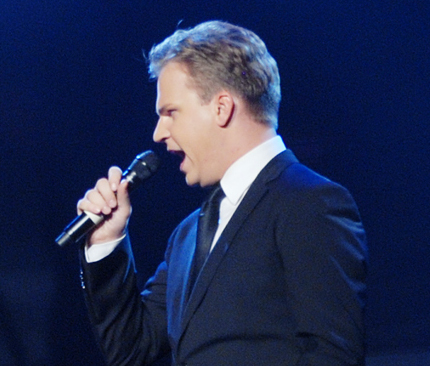
Chodúr in 2011

Upon graduating with a high school diploma from the Janáček Academy of Music and Performing Arts in Ostrava in 2009, Chodúr participated in SuperStar with support from his Robson bandmates. He stated that it challenged him to sing different genres of music, such as pop, rock, jazz, and others. Competing for the Česko Slovenská SuperStar title in Bratislava's Incheba Arena, Chodúr won over his opponent Miroslav Šmajda. The same year, he won the Český slavík award in the Discovery of the Year category.

Songs that Chodúr interpreted in the competition:

| semifinal | final | grand final |
|---|---|---|
| "Venus" (Shocking Blue); "Lady Carneval" (Karel Gott); "Hallelujah" (Leonard Cohen) | "A Little Less Conversation" / "Blue Suede Shoes" (Elvis Presley); "Feeling Good" (Michael Bublé); "Billie Jean" (Michael Jackson); "Crazy" (Aerosmith); "Oči má sněhem zaváté" (Karel Gott); "Are You Gonna Go My Way" (Lenny Kravitz); "Everybody Hurts" (R.E.M.); "Každý mi tě lásko závidí" (Michal David); "Maria" (West Side Story); "Rozeznávám" (Richard Müller); "Cigaretka na dva tahy" (Richard Müller); "Paparazzi" (Lady Gaga) | "I Heard It Through the Grapevine" (Marvin Gaye); "White Christmas" (Frank Sinatra); "Supreme" (Robbie Williams) |

=== 2010–2012: Let's Celebrate and Manifest ===
After winning Česko Slovenská SuperStar, Chodúr began working with producer Daniel Hádl on his debut album, Let's Celebrate. He brought ten new compositions to the record—nine with English lyrics and one in Czech, plus a cover of "Paparazzi" by Lady Gaga. The record became the bestselling album in the Czech Republic in 2010, and the third bestselling album in the Slovak Republic. It was released in 2010 by Sony Music. Chodúr recorded the album with an accompanying band that included Slovak musicians Oskar Rozsa and Martin Valihora.

After the release of Let's Celebrate, Chodúr began working on his next album, titled Manifest. The album, sung entirely in Czech, was supported by a big band, including strings and a choir.

=== 2013–2015: Martin Chodúr Sings ===
In May 2013, Chodúr introduced his new jazz project, Martin Chodúr Sings Jazz, accompanied by a band whose members were Vlastimil Šmída, Patrik Benek, Jan Kyjovský, Marián Friedl, and Marcela Božíková. The successful project continued in the spring of 2014 with Martin Chodúr Sings Chansons and in May 2015, Martin Chodúr Sings Film Melodies. The ensemble performed at numerous jazz festivals, including Vsetín Jazz Festival, St. Wenceslas Music Festival of the Moravian-Silesian Region, St. Nicholas Jazz Festival, Jarda Marčík Swing Festival, and Těšín Jazz Festival.

=== 2015: 3 ===
Chodúr's third studio album, named simply 3, was also entirely in Czech. It contains thirteen tracks plus a bonus song, "Lullaby". Ostrava musicians, including pianist Vlastimil Šmída, drummer Patrik Benek, saxophonist Marcela Božíková, and others contributed to the record.

=== 2015: Hallelujah (Vánoční písně a koledy) ===
Hallelujah (Vánoční písně a koledy) is Chodúr's fourth album. It was recorded with the sixty-member Janáček Philharmonic Orchestra, led by Marek Prášil. The majority of the tracks on the album are well-known Christmas songs. The title track is Leonard Cohen's famous "Hallelujah". Other popular covers include "The Power of Love" by Frankie Goes to Hollywood. The pieces are sung variously in Czech, English, and Latin.

== Collaboration with orchestras and big bands ==
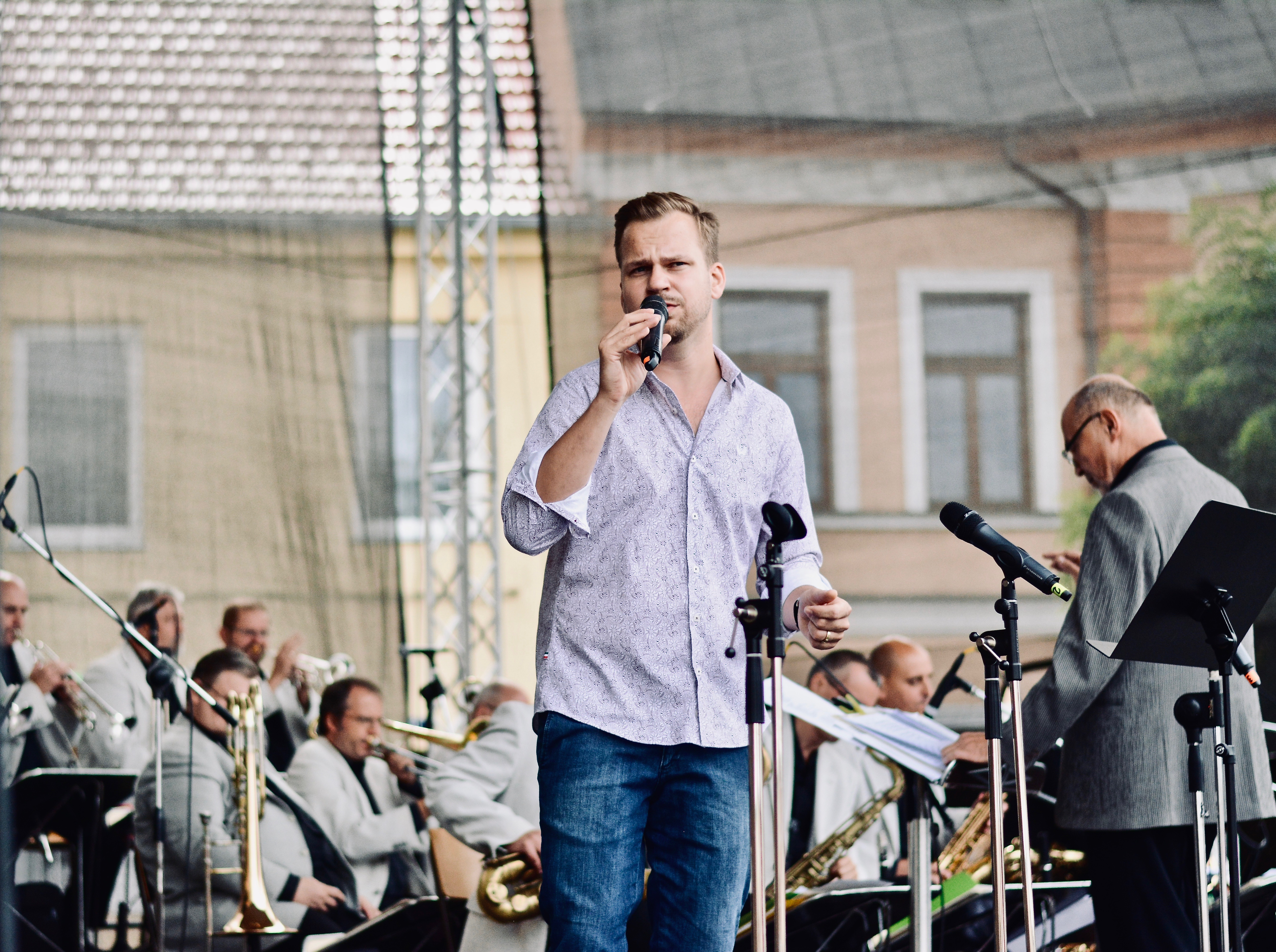
Martin Chodúr with Karel Vlach Orchestra (2020)

Throughout his career, Chodúr has often collaborated with orchestras and big bands. He has performed with some of the biggest names in Czechia and Slovakia, including Felix Slováček Big Band, Karel Vlach Orchestra, Pavol Zajačík Big Band, B-Side Band, Golden Big Band Prague, F Major Jazzband, Václav Hybš Big Band, Big Blast Band, Ondřej Havelka a jeho Melody Makers, and North Big Band Litvínov. In mid-2010, he started the Symphony Session project, where he presented his own and world compositions in an orchestral setting. A series of three concerts under the direction of Slovak conductor Oskar Rózsza took place in Ostrava, Zlín, and Bratislava. The guest vocalist at these concerts was the Slovak operatic soprano Patricia Janečková, who sang the central duet from the musical Phantom of the Opera with Chodúr.

In May 2012, Chodúr was a guest of the Russian Army Corps Alexandrov Ensemble during their tour of Czechia and Slovakia. They performed together in České Budějovice, Ostrava, Brno, and Bratislava.

At the 2017 Film Music Prague Festival, as part of the concert "A Story of Love", dedicated to the film music of Scottish composer and Grammy Award winner Craig Armstrong, Chodúr sang the song "Nature Boy", accompanied by the Praga Sinfonietta Orchestra, and the duet "Come What May" with British soprano Christina Johnston, both from the musical Moulin Rouge!

In October 2018, as part of the fourth concert series Pocta českým filmům a pohádkám at Prague's Rudolfinum, Chodúr performed as soloist with Hana Holišová, accompanied by the Prague Symphony Orchestra FOK, Kúhn's Mixed Choir, and Jizerka Children's Choir, conducted by Martin Kumžák.

== Discography ==
=== with Robson ===
- Who Is Martin? (2006)

=== Solo ===
- Let's Celebrate (2010)
- Manifest (2012)
- 3 (2015)
- Hallelujah (Vánoční písně a koledy) (2018)
