= La Stellidaura vendicante =

1674 opera by Francesco Provenzale

Difendere l'offensore overo La Stellidaura vendicante ("Vengeful Stellidaura"; Naples, 1674) is an opera by Francesco Provenzale. It is one of only two operas by Provenzale to survive.

The opera was a major success for Provenzale and continued in the repertoire.

== Recording ==
- La Stellidaura vendicante – Stellidaura (mezzo-soprano) Jennifer Rivera; Armillo (countertenor) Hagen Matzeit; Armidoro (tenor) Bogdan Mihai; Orismondo (tenor) Carlo Allemano; Giampetro (bass) Enzo Capuano. Academia Montis Regalis, Alessandro De Marchi (conductor); 2 CDs, Deutsche Harmonia Mundi, Festwochen der Alten Musik May 2013
