= The Long Christmas Dinner (opera) =

Opera by Paul Hindemith

- Opera by Paul Hindemith
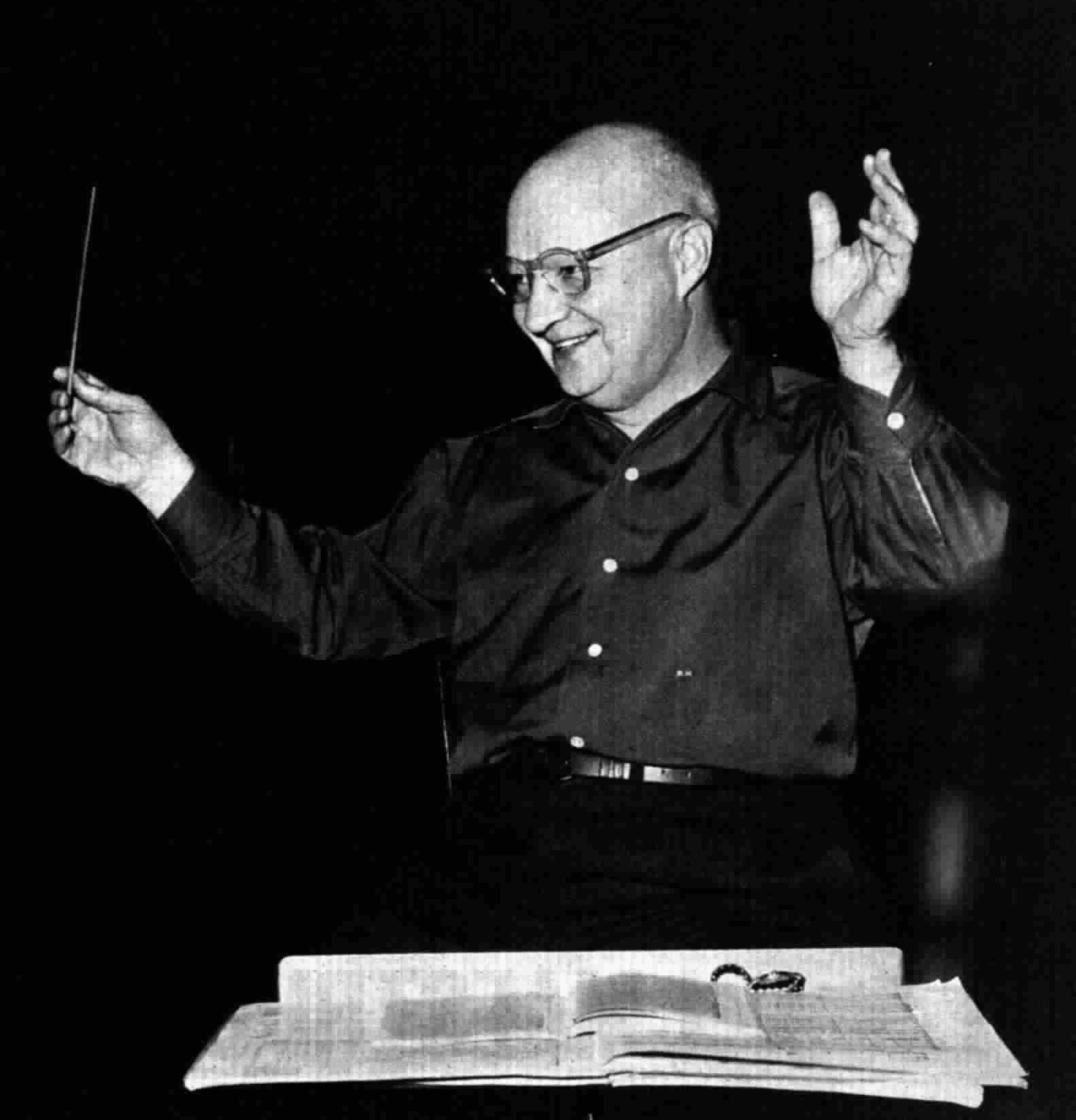
- The composer in 1958
- Librettist: Thornton Wilder
- Language: English
- Based on: The Long Christmas Dinner by Wilder
- Premiere: 17 December 1961; Nationaltheater Mannheim

The Long Christmas Dinner (German: Das lange Weihnachtsmahl) is an opera in one act by Paul Hindemith, with an English libretto by Thornton Wilder based on his 1931 play of the same name.

Wilder collaborated with the composer in order to make the text work effectively with the music. It is set for a chamber orchestra and a harpsichord.

== Performance history ==
The opera was first staged in Hindemith's own German translation and conducted by him at the Nationaltheater Mannheim on 17 December 1961. It was then performed in the original English on 13 March 1963 at the Juilliard School of Music, New York City, also conducted by the composer.

A digital recording of the work on the WERGO label was performed in Hindemith's German translation. A commercial recording of the original English version was released by Bridge Records in 2015.

== Roles ==
Roles, voice types, English-language premiere cast
Role	Voice type	English-language premiere cast, 13 March 1963 Conductor: Paul Hindemith
Lucia	soprano	Lorna Haywood
Lucia II	soprano	Lorraine Santore
Leonora	soprano	Frances Riley
Mother Bayard	contralto	Marilyn Zschau
Ermengarde	contralto	Janet Wagner
Geneviève	mezzo-soprano	Geraldine McIlroy
Charles	tenor	Robert White
Roderick	baritone	John Harris
Roderick II	tenor	Clifton Steere
Sam	baritone	Calvin Coots
Brandon	bass	Allan Evans
Nursemaid	mezzo-soprano	Veronica Tyler

== Synopsis ==
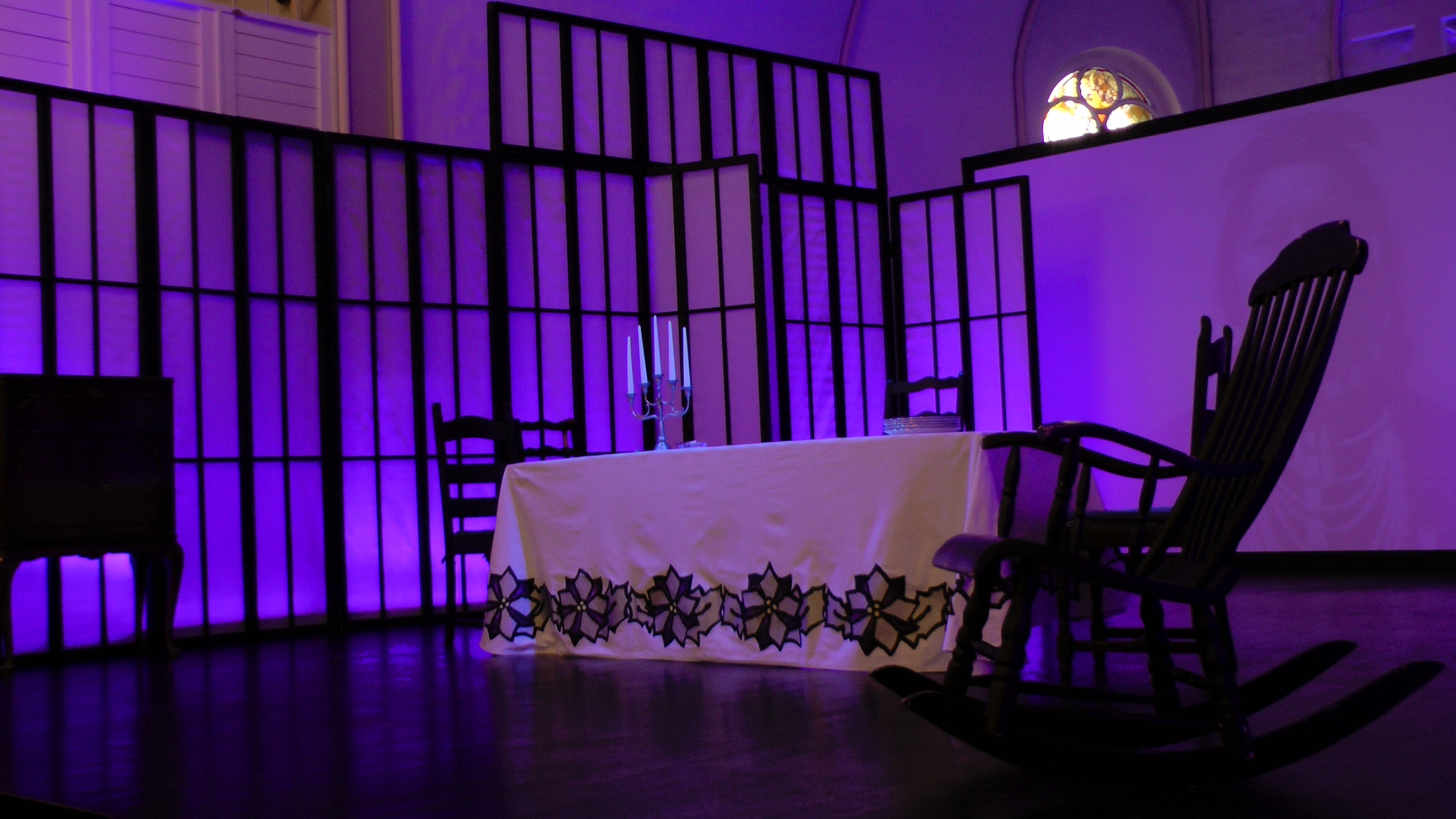
Stage set by the Estonian National Opera

The opera depicts 90 years in the history of the mid-western Bayard family.

The opera opens with Lucia, wife of Roderick Bayard, setting the table for Christmas dinner. Having finished, she calls down her husband and his mother, who is joining them in their first Christmas dinner in their new house. Over dinner, Roderick's mother, referred to as Mother Bayard, recalls a time in her childhood when Indians lived where the house now rests; at the time, there was no city, only a church and surrounding forestry. She goes on to discuss the importance of remembering the names of one's ancestors.

The opera moves forward to another Christmas dinner between Roderick, Lucia, and Mother Bayard, this time joined by Roderick's cousin Brandon, who is back from his time spent in Alaska. As they eat, Brandon asks Mother Bayard how the two are related. As the years go on, Mother Bayard dies, leaving Lucia, Roderick, and Brandon. All three wonder aloud how long they've resided in the Bayard house, remarking on how quickly the time flies. Soon after Mother Bayard dies, Lucia's and Roderick's son Charles is born. Not long after the birth of their son, another baby arrives: Genevieve, their daughter.

Again, the action moves forward in time to a later Christmas dinner where an ailing Roderick, Lucia, and Brandon, are now joined by a grown-up Charles and Genevieve. The men give a toast to the firm owned and run by the Bayard family, and the women join in on the merriment. Roderick dies shortly after this point in time, leaving behind a devastated Lucia. She, Brandon, Genevieve, and Charles reflect on past Christmas dinners. After a quick change in subject, Genevieve announces to her mother that Charles is engaged to be married, adding that she herself will never marry, so that she may always remain with her mother.

The scene shifts briefly to show the marriage of Charles and his wife, Leonora. The newlyweds join Lucia, Brandon, and Genevieve for Christmas dinner. Not long after Charles and Leonora marry, the couple birth a baby—however, the baby dies in infancy. Brandon dies, and is quickly followed by Lucia. The death of Lucia greatly devastates Genevieve, who is left wondering what to do with her life. On the tail end of Lucia's death is the birth of Leonora's fraternal twins: Sam and Lucia II Bayard. Not long afterward, Roderick Brandon Bayard II is also born.

Leonora and Charles write to the latter's cousin Ermengarde, asking her to stay with them. During dinner one Christmas, Ermengarde and Charles discuss their relations and reminisce about their ancestors. Sam, on holiday leave from the military, joins the family for Christmas dinner along with his twin sister, Lucia II. Sam tells his family to do what they normally do on Christmas Day, so that he may cherish the memory of his family's Christmas dinner. Soon after, he goes off to the Korean War and dies there.

Years later, Roderick II jovially joins the family, talking of his and Lucia II's fun time at the ball. Charles berates Roderick II for getting drunk and making a fool of himself, and reminds him that he will soon enter the family firm. Roderick II lashes out angrily, claiming that the town in which they live is so dull that drinking is the only way to endure it. He angrily storms out as he exclaims that he will move away to a “town where something happens,” despite his mother's pleading that he stay. Lucia leaves soon afterward to travel with her spouse, promising to bring children back with her.

Charles and Ermengarde both fall ill, and an atmosphere of sadness is draped over the household. Eventually, Genevieve snaps, fed up with her life of depression following her mother's death. She informs her family that she will go away to die alone, and leaves.

Charles writes his son a letter, forgiving him for tarnishing the family name and refusing to carry on with the firm. He promises to send him another message the following Christmas, but dies before he is able to do so.

Leonora's health declines as she is left with only a dying Ermengarde in the house. The two try to reflect on just how old the house has become: it is nearly ninety years old by this point. Leonora tells Ermengarde that she may have the house if she wants it, as there are no more children around to inherit it. Leonora leaves the room, and Ermengarde finds a letter sent to the house by Lucia II. Attached are pictures of her children—a boy named Roderick III and a girl named Lucia III—along with a letter, informing her that a new Bayard house has been built by Lucia II and Roderick II. Whilst reading the letter, Ermengarde dies.

== See also ==
- List of Christmas operas
