= Opera houses in the Czech Republic =

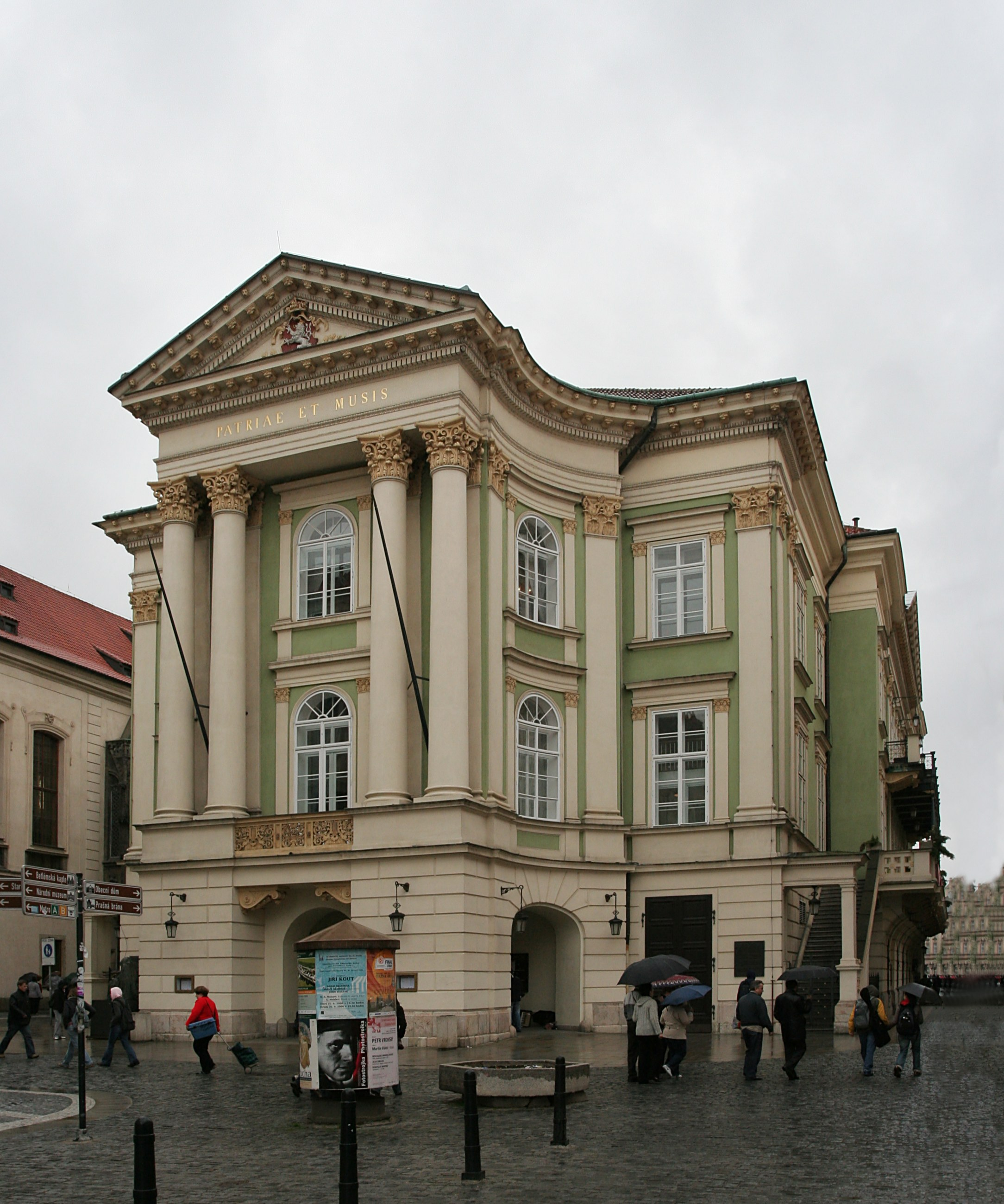
Estates Theatre in Prague

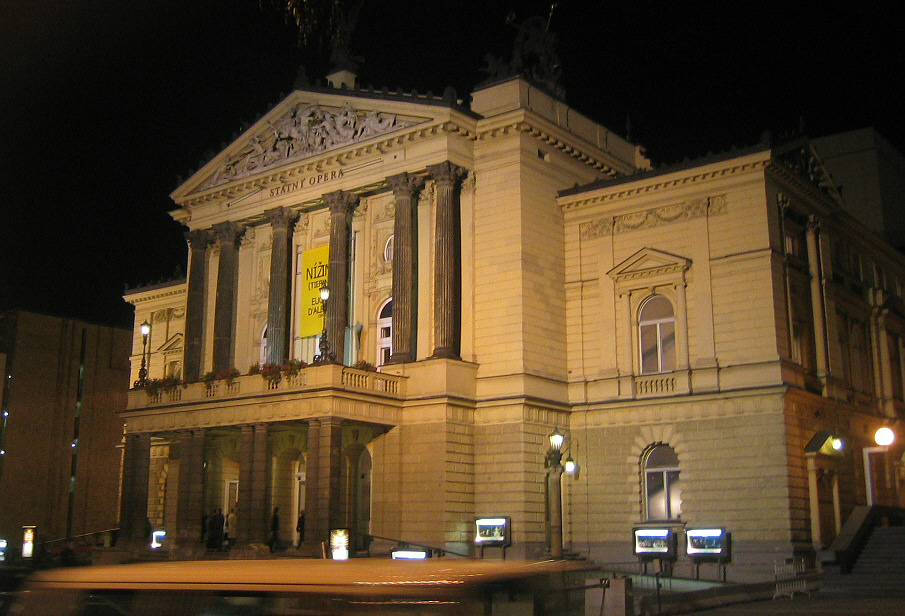
State Opera in Prague

There are ten opera houses in the Czech Republic. The most important are the two opera houses in Prague - National Theatre (Prague) and Prague State Opera.

There are four other opera houses in Bohemia - in Plzeň, České Budějovice, Liberec and Ústí nad Labem - and four other opera houses in Moravia - in Brno, Ostrava, Olomouc and Opava.

== List of the opera houses ==
- National Theatre (Národní divadlo) in Prague - Estates Theatre (Stavovské divadlo) stage
- State Opera (Státní opera Praha) in Prague
- National Theatre Brno (Národní divadlo Brno) – Janáček Theatre (Janáčkovo divadlo) stage
- South Bohemian Theatre (Jihočeské divadlo) in České Budějovice
- F. X. Šalda Theatre (Divadlo F. X. Šaldy Liberec)
- Moravian Theatre Olomouc (Moravské divadlo Olomouc)
- Opava Silesian Theatre (Slezské divadlo Opava)
- National Moravian-Silesian Theatre (Národní divadlo moravskoslezské)
- Josef Kajetán Tyl Theatre - (Divadlo Josefa Kajetána Tyla v Plzni) in Plzeň
- North Bohemian Theatre (Severočeské divadlo opery a baletu) in Ústí nad Labem
