= Becoming Santa Claus =

2015 opera by Mark Adamo

Becoming Santa Claus is an opera in one act by American composer Mark Adamo. Adamo also wrote the English-language libretto. Commissioned by the Dallas Opera, the work had its world premiere at the Winspear Opera House on December 4, 2015. The opera has an approximate running time of 100 minutes.

The Fort Worth Star-Telegram review criticized the opera for a lack of memorable music, although the reviewer described the music as tonal and pleasant if forgettable. The critic also felt the opera lacked a clear target audience in its design. The critic asserted that Santa Claus as a topic was better targeted towards children, but that the opera's serious elements were beyond what a children's audience could handle. The reviewer also felt that its running time without an intermission would not be viable for an audience of children.

== Roles ==
Roles, voice types, premiere cast
Role	Voice type	Premiere cast, 4 December 2015 Conductor: Emmanuel Villaume
Queen Sophine	mezzo-soprano	Jennifer Rivera
Prince Claus	tenor	Jonathan Blalock
Donkey/Messenger	bass	Matt Boehler
Yan, an elf	soprano	Hila Plitmann
Ib, an elf	mezzo-soprano	Lucy Schaufer
Yab, an elf	tenor	Keith Jameson
Ob, an elf	bass-baritone	Kevin Burdette

== See also ==
- List of Christmas operas
