= Jennifer Rivera =

American opera singer

Jennifer Rivera is an American mezzo-soprano who has had an active international performance career in operas and concerts since the early 2000s.

Rivera studied at the Juilliard School and appeared in several productions with the Juilliard Opera Center, including Gluck's Armide (1999) and the title role in Rossini's La Cenerentola (2000), a role that she repeated at Florida Grand Opera in 2009. Rivera performed extensively at New York City Opera early in her career, performing such roles as Hansel Hansel and Gretel (2002), Lazuli in Chabrier's L'étoile (2002), Meg in Mark Adamo's Little Women (2003), Cherubino in The Marriage of Figaro (2004), Rosina in The Barber of Seville (2005), Myrrhine in Adamo's Lysistrata (2006), and Nerone in Handel's Agrippina (2007).

In 2007, she was also a soloist with the Naumburg Orchestral Concerts, in the Naumburg Bandshell, Central Park, in the summer series.

The same year, 2007, Rivera created the role of Sharon Falconer in the world premiere of Robert Aldridge Elmer Gantry at the Nashville Opera, a role that she repeated at the Montclair State University in 2008. Also in 2008, Rivera performed the role of Sesto in Mozart's La clemenza di Tito under Roberto Abbado with the Teatro Regio di Torino. In 2009 she sang Varèse's Offrandes in concert with the American Symphony Orchestra, and in 2010 she performed the role of Nerone in Handel's Agrippina under René Jacobs at the Berlin Staatsoper and created the role of Veruca Salt in the world premiere of Peter Ash's The Golden Ticket with the Opera Theatre of Saint Louis. In 2011, Rivera performed the role of Ismene in Traetta's Antigona under René Jacobs at the Berlin Staatsoper, and in 2012, she performed title role in Francesco Provenzale's La Stellidaura vendicante at the Innsbruck Early Music Festival.

In 2013 Rivera performed Kurt Weill’s Mahagonny Songspiel and portrayed the Nanny in Ernst Toch’s Princess and the Pea at the Gotham Chamber Opera. In 2014 she performed the role of Sister Helen Prejean in Jake Heggie's Dead Man Walking at the Central City Opera, a role that she repeated the following year at Opera Parallèle in San Francisco and then again in 2016 with New Orleans Opera. She also appeared as Prince Orlofsky in Die Fledermaus at the Portland Opera and as Nerone to Peabody Southwell's Agrippina at Opera Omaha in 2014. In 2015 she portrayed Queen Sophine in the world premiere of Adamo's Becoming Santa Claus at the Dallas Opera.

In 2011 she performed the role of Nerone on a recording of Handel's Agrippina with the Akademie für Alte Musik Berlin under conductor René Jacobs for Harmonia Mundi. In 2013 she recorded the title role in Provenzale's La Stellidaura vendicante, also for Harmonia Mundi. In 2015, she received a Helpmann Award, Australia's award for distinguished artistic achievement, as Best Female Performer in an Opera for the role of Faramondo in the Brisbane Baroque production of Faramondo directed by Paul Curran. In 2015 she recorded the role of Penelope in Monteverdi's Il ritorno d'Ulisse in patria which has been nominated for the 2016 Grammy Award for Best Opera Recording Grammy Award for Best Engineered Album, Classical.

Rivera was a regular contributor to The Huffington Post Arts and Culture Section and, in 2015, was named the Center for Contemporary Opera's first Director for Artistic Development.

Rivera is an alumna of the Music Academy of the West where she attended the summer conservatory program in 1995 and 1996.

From 2018 to 2024, Rivera served as the Executive Director & CEO of Long Beach Opera. In 2019, she oversaw the world premiere of the Pulitzer Prize winning opera The Central Park Five by Anthony Davis. Under Rivera's tenure, Long Beach Opera was accused of "racial tokenism" and "a culture of misogyny" by former employees. An independent review commissioned by Long Beach Opera found no evidence of racism or sexism, but did find that some employees experienced a lack of respect from executive management, and Rivera took responsibility for employees "feeling unseen and unheard".
