= Antonín Dvořák Theatre =

Opera house in Ostrava, Czech Republic

- Divadlo Antonína Dvořáka
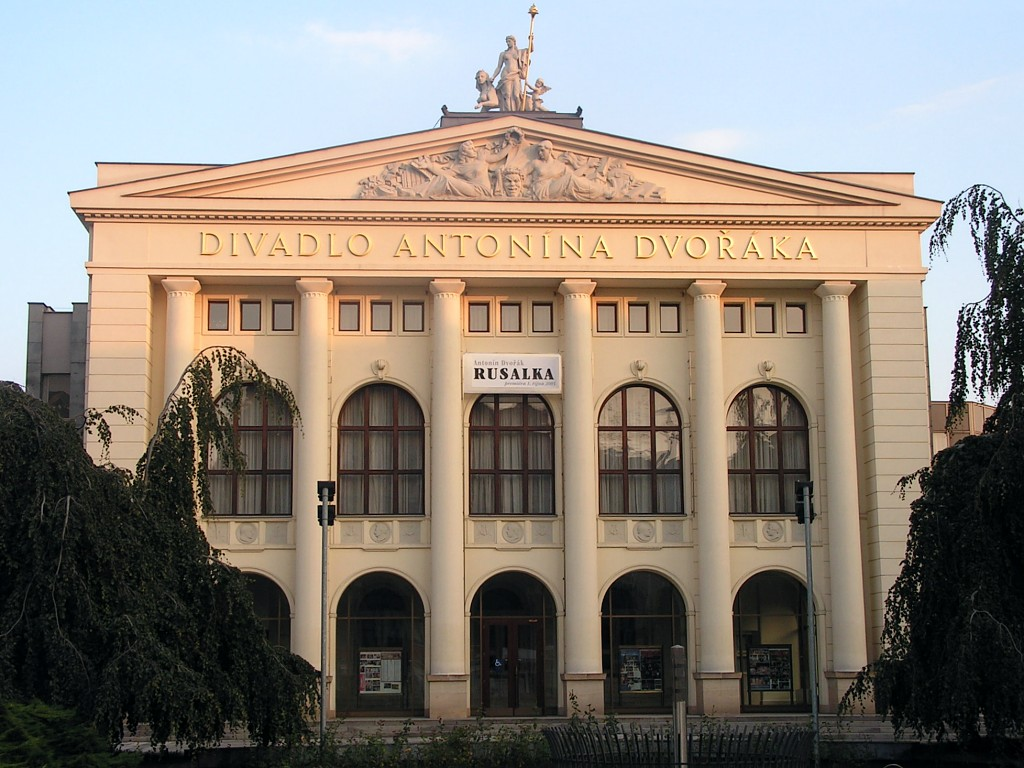
- Antonín Dvořák Theatre, Ostrava
- Interactive map of Antonín Dvořák Theatre
- Address: Smetanovo náměstí 3104; Ostrava; Czech Republic
- Coordinates: 49°49′57″N 18°17′28.32″E
- Owner: Czech Republic

Construction
- Opened: 1918
- Architect: Alexander Graf

Website
- Official website

The Antonín Dvořák Theatre (Czech: Divadlo Antonína Dvořáka) is an opera house in Ostrava, Czech Republic, which opened in 1907. Since 1919, it has been one of two permanent venues of the National Moravian Silesian Theatre.

== History ==
The Neo-baroque building of the theatre was designed by architect Alexander Graf. It was built by the Ostrava company Noe & Storch. The Antonín Dvořák Theatre was the first building in what is now the Czech Republic to use reinforced concrete beams.

The interior was designed by sculptors of the company Johann Bock & Son. The sculptures decorating the facade were made by Eduard Smetana and Leopold Kosiga. Drama and Music, two reliefs in the main foyer of the theatre, were donated by academic sculptor Helena Scholzová (Helen Zelezny-Scholz).

The Antonín Dvořák Theatre was opened on 28 September 1907, as a German theatre. Up to 1919, the performances were solely in German. Following the World War I, the theatre passed to the hands of Czechoslovak state and became a stage of the National Moravian Silesian Theatre. From 1949, the theatre was renamed as the Zdeněk Nejedlý Theatre and in 1990 as the Antonín Dvořák Theatre.
