= National Moravian-Silesian Theatre =

Theatre company in the Czech Republic

Coordinates: 49°50′11″N 18°17′18″E

- Národní divadlo moravskoslezské
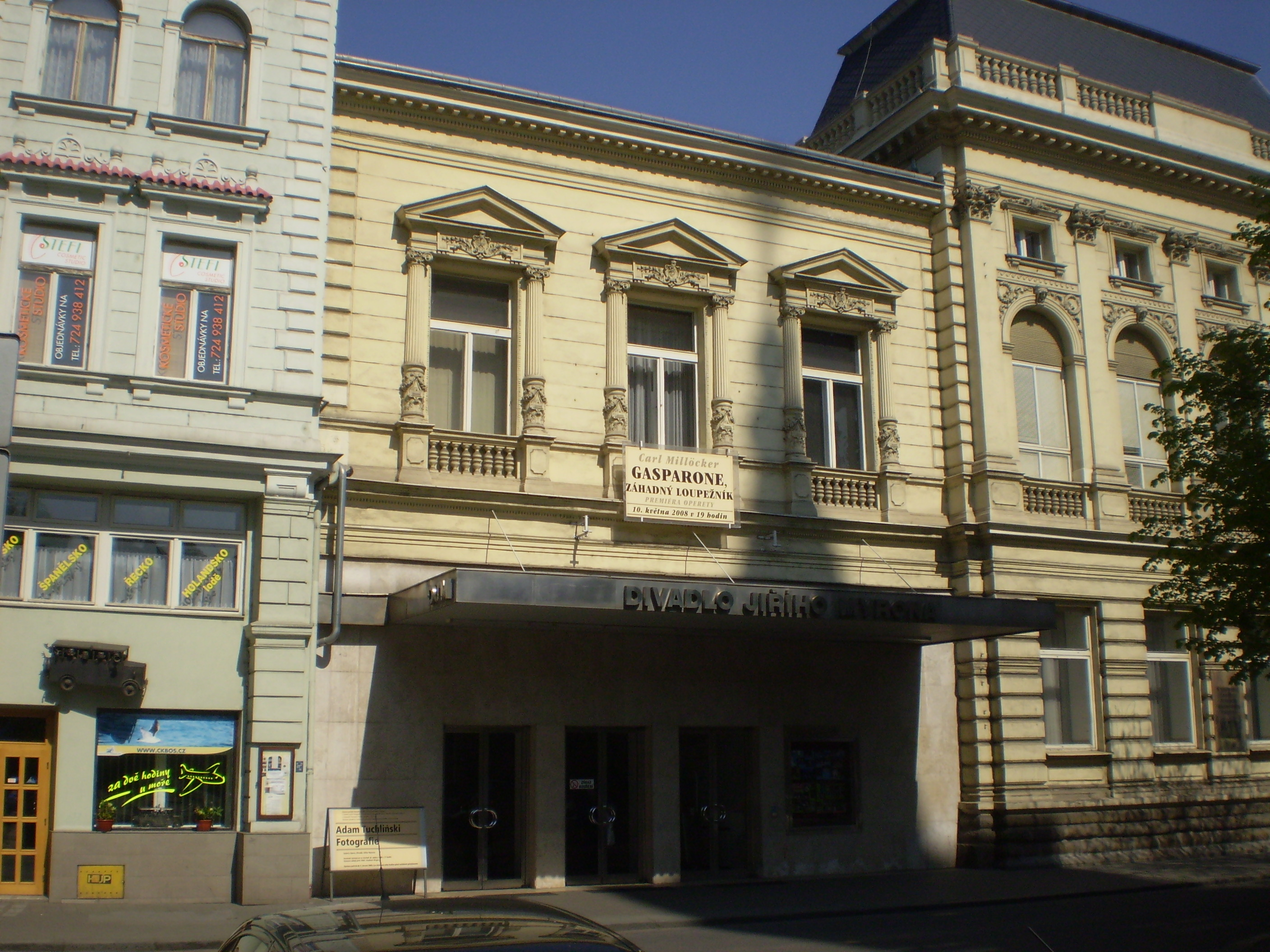
- Jiří Myron Theatre
- Address: Čs. legií 148/14; Ostrava; Czech Republic

Construction
- Opened: 1919

Website
- Official website

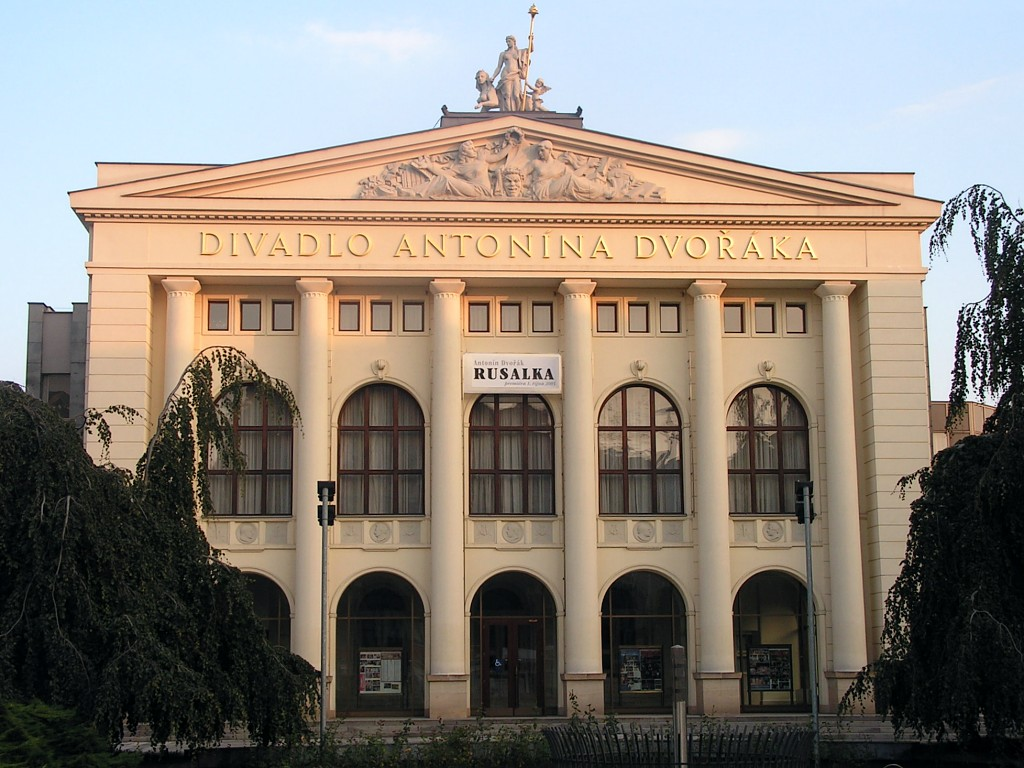
Antonín Dvořák Theatre

The National Moravian-Silesian Theatre (Czech: Národní divadlo moravskoslezské; NDM) is a professional theatre company based in Ostrava in the Czech Republic. It is one of ten opera houses in the country, and the largest theatre company in the Moravian-Silesian Region. The NDM has two permanent theatres, the Antonín Dvořák Theatre and the Jiří Myron Theatre. The company was registered in 1918, and the theatre was first opened to the public on 19 August 1919.

== Artistic output ==
The theatre consists of four artistic companies: drama, opera, operetta/musical, and ballet. Each year the theatre stages 16–19 premieres and just under 500 performances. The current director of the theatre is Jiří Nekvasil, and the artistic directors of the four companies are Jakub Klecker (opera), Vojtěch Štěpánek (drama), Lenka Dřímalová (ballet), and Gabriela Petráková (operetta/musical).

== Names ==
- 1919: National Moravian-Silesian Theatre (Czech: Národní divadlo moravsko-slezské; NDMS)
- 1941: Czech Moravian-Ostravian Theatre (Czech: České divadlo moravskoostravské; ČDMO)
- 1945: Moravian Ostrava Provincial Theatre (Czech: Zemské divadlo v Moravské Ostravě; ZDO)
- 1948: State Theatre in Ostrava (Czech: Státní divadlo v Ostravě; SDO)
- 1995: National Moravian-Silesian Theatre (Czech: Národní divadlo moravskoslezské; NDM)

== List of directors ==
- Václav Jiřikovský (1919–1923)
- František Uhlíř (1923–1926)
- Miloš Nový (1926–1930)
- Ladislav Knotek (1930–1939)
- Karel Jičínský (1939–1939)
- Jan Škoda (1940–1942)
- Jiří Myron (1942–1946)
- Stanislav Langer (1946–1948)
- Antonín Kurš (1948–1952)
- Drahoš Želenský (1952–1953)
- Miloslav Holub (1954–1956)
- Vladislav Hamšík (1956–1971)
- Zdeněk Starý (1971–1988)
- Dalibor Malina (1989–1991)
- Ilja Racek (1991–1998)
- Luděk Golat (1998–2009)
- Jiří Nekvasil (since 2010)
