= The Long Christmas Dinner =

One-act play written by Thornton Wilder

First edition (publ. Coward-McCann)

The Long Christmas Dinner is a play in one act written by American novelist and playwright Thornton Wilder in 1931. In its first published form, it was included in the volume The Long Christmas Dinner and Other Plays in One Act.

== Characters ==
The characters, as they are listed in the script:

- Lucia
- Mother Bayard
- Roderick
- Cousin Brandon
- Charles, son of Roderick and Lucia
- Genevieve, daughter of Roderick and Lucia
- The Nurse
- Leonora, wife of Charles
- Ermengarde
- Sam, son of Charles and Leonora
- Lucia II, daughter of Charles and Leonora
- Roderick II, son of Charles and Leonora

== Plot ==
Setting: 90 years in the dining room of the Bayard House.

Length: ~35 minutes

Summary: A one-act drama about several generations of one family:

A play whose action traverses ninety years and represents in accelerated motion ninety Christmas dinners in the Bayard home. The development of the countryside, the changes in customs and manners during this period of time as well as the growth of the Bayard family and their accumulation of property sums up vividly a wide aspect of American life. It is a serious play lightened with humor of character; it has a human, tender, moving quality both appealing and forceful.

== Performance history ==
It was first performed jointly by the Yale Dramatic Association and the Vassar Philaletheis Society.

Currently, Samuel French, Inc., owns the rights to The Long Christmas Dinner.

== Adaptation ==
In 1963, an operatic adaptation, with music by Paul Hindemith to text by Wilder, entitled The Long Christmas Dinner, was premiered at the Juilliard School of Music.

== Influence ==
The Long Christmas Dinner inspired a famous scene in Orson Welles's 1941 film Citizen Kane — the breakfast-table montage in which the nine-year deterioration of Kane's marriage is told through a conversation seen in five vignettes. Several breakfast scenes were to be filmed, but during shooting Welles had the idea of simply photographing it as a continuous scene without dissolves, with the camera whipping back and forth.

"[The idea] was stolen from The Long Christmas Dinner of Thornton Wilder!" Welles told filmmaker Peter Bogdanovich. "I did the breakfast scene thinking I'd invented it. It wasn't in the script originally. And when I was almost finished with it, I suddenly realized that I'd unconsciously stolen it from Thornton and I called him up and admitted to it." When Bogdanovich asked how Wilder reacted, Welles replied, "He was pleased." Welles and Wilder were good friends.
