= Pavel Helebrand =

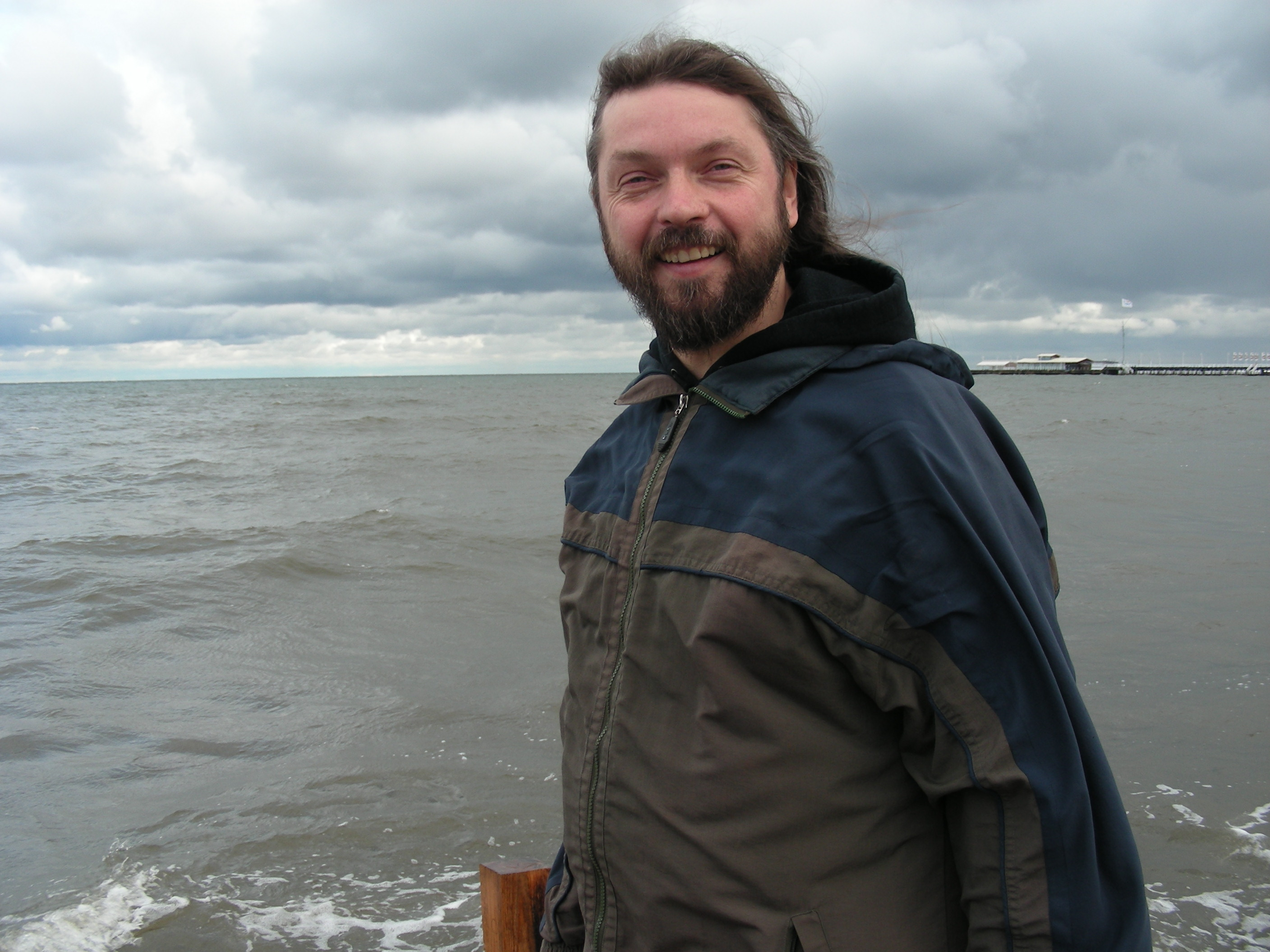
Pavel Helebrand (2009)

Pavel Helebrand (October 25, 1960, Opava) is a contemporary Czech composer known for his theatrical scores for productions including Romeo and Juliet, Pride and Prejudice and Cinderella.
