= Robert Belgrade =

American actor

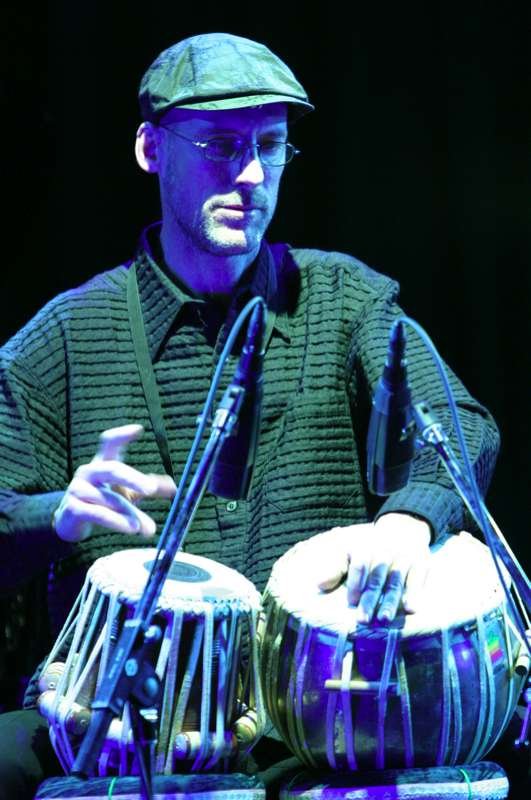
- Belgrade playing tabla on stage.
- Other name: Robbie Belgrade
- Occupations: Voice actor, musician
- Years active: 1991–2007, 2015–present
- Notable credit(s): Castlevania: Symphony of the Night as Alucard; Tekken 5 as Narrator
- Website: belgrademusic.com

Robert Belgrade is an American multi-instrumentalist, composer, music educator and narrator, best known as the original English dubbing voice acting for Alucard in Castlevania: Symphony of the Night and as the narrator in Tekken 5 and Tekken 5: Dark Resurrection.

== Education ==
Belgrade began his studies in Western classical music on the piano, trumpet and flute. After that he studied the saxophone and improvisation under John Handy. He also studied vocal music under Ali Akbar Khan and tabla under Alla Rakha, Zakir Hussain and Swapan Chaudhuri. He currently resides in Tokyo, Japan and performs in a wide range of musical genres, including R&B, jazz, Latin and Indian music.

== Voice acting ==
Belgrade worked regularly as a voice actor in video games from 1994 to 2007, with notable roles being Alucard in Castlevania: Symphony of the Night and the Narrator in Tekken 5.

After some time away to focus on his music career and family he returned to voice over work with the role of Orlok Dracule in Koji Igarashi's Bloodstained: Ritual of the Night.

== Filmography ==
=== Video games ===
Year	Title	Role	Notes	Source
1995	Hang-On GP	System Voice		
1995	Mach Breakers: Numan Athletics 2	Karl Weisemann		
1996	Star Ocean	Captain		
1997	Soul Blade	Nathaniel 'Rock' Adams, Hephaestus	English dub	
1997	Castlevania: Symphony of the Night	Alucard	English dub	
1998	Tenchu: Stealth Assassins	Narrator	English dub	
1999	Tekken Tag Tournament	Announcer	Uncredited	
2000	GunGriffon Blaze			
2000	Silpheed: The Lost Planet	Narrator		
2000	Dynasty Warriors 2	Cao Cao	English dub	
2000	Shenmue	Pedro	English dub	
2000	Sky Odyssey	Narrator		
2000	WinBack: Covert Operations	Mike Hawkins	English dub	
2002	Shenmue II	Cool Z	English dub	
2003	Mega Man X7	Signas	English dub	
2003	Transformers	Optimus Prime, Soundwave, Narrator		
2004	Way of the Samurai 2	Goshiro Muto	English dub	
2004	Silent Hill 4: The Room	Joseph Schreiber	Uncredited	
2004	Tekken 5	Narrator		
2005	Tekken 5: Dark Resurrection	Narrator		
2007	Lunar Knights	Stoker	English dub	
2019	Bloodstained: Ritual of the Night	Orlok Dracule	English dub	
2020	Wallachia: Reign of Dracula	Radu cel Frumos	English dub	
2023	Lunacid	Narrator, Crilall		
