= Mouthwash (disambiguation) =

Mouthwash is a liquid which is swilled around the mouth.

It may also refer to:

- "Mouthwash" (song), a Kate Nash song
- Mouthwashing (video game), a 2024 psychological horror game

== See also ==
- Mouthwashing (disambiguation)
