= Kora-1 =

Ballistic vest of Russian police

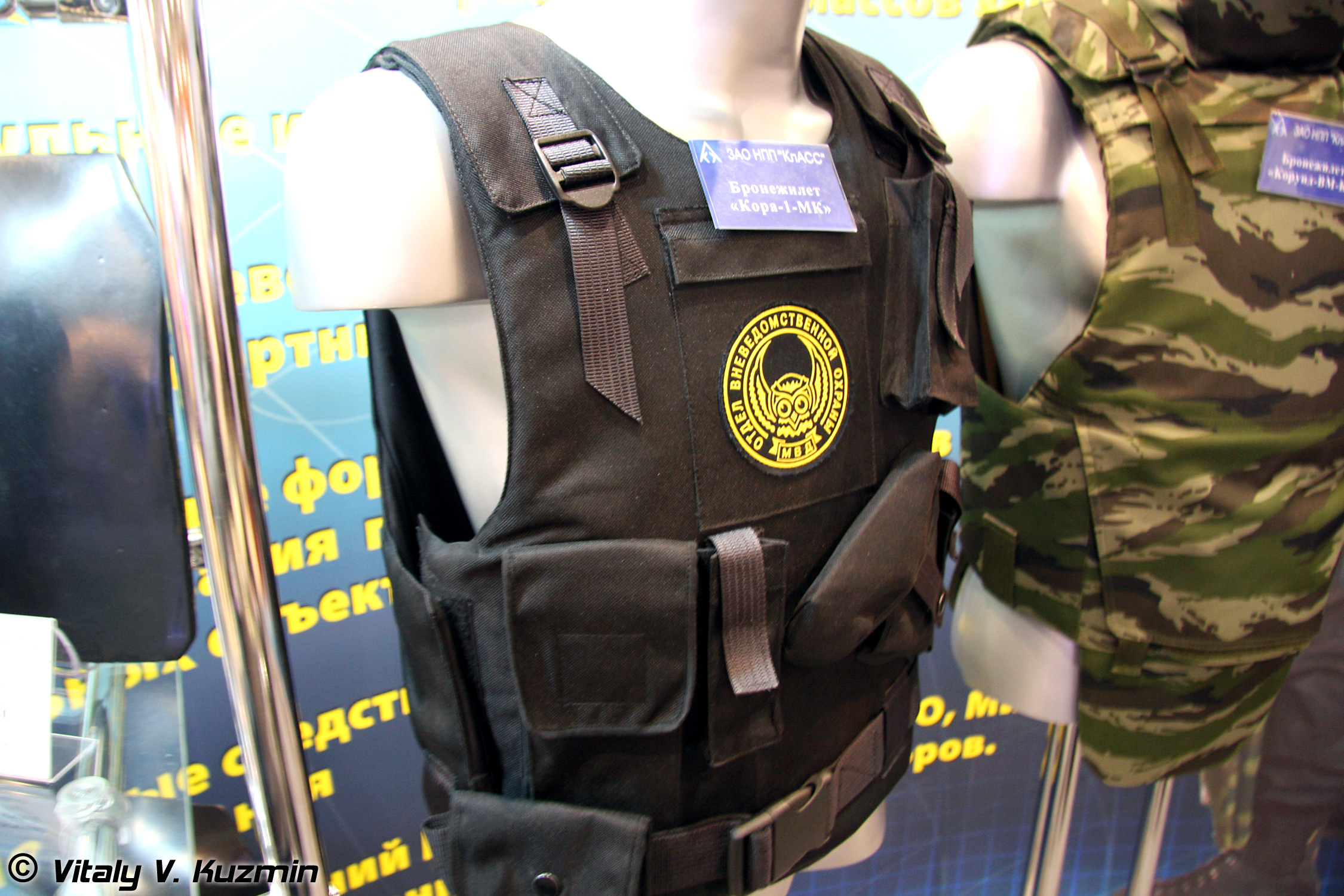
- Kora-1mk body armor
- Type: Ballistic vest
- Place of origin: Russian Federation

Service history
- In service: 1992-present
- Used by: MVD

Production history
- Designer: NPP KlASS
- Manufacturer: NPP KlASS

Specifications
- Weight: 2.8-4.2 kg

Kora-1 (Russian: Кора-1; ''bark'') is a Russian ballistic vest. Developed by NPP KIASS, it was adopted into service by MVD.

== History ==
The rise in crime and an increase in attacks on police officers in the early 1990s led to the development of specialized body armor that could be worn for long periods of time. In 1992, Kora-1M body armor began to be supplied to GAI units.

The vest continued to be improved and came in several different variants, with new versions adopted as late as 2007.

== Design ==
The design of the body armor allows it to be used as a concealed vest. The body armor consists of two modules (chest with groin protection and back) with protective elements (soft multi-layer screens made of ballistic fabric, sewn into waterproof covers). The modules are connected to each other via belts with a velcro fastener, which allows the body armor to be individually adjusted to fit a body shape.

The body armor can be used as a soft body armor of class 1 protection, but it is also possible to install additional armor elements to protect the chest and back area.

Newer models may be equipped with external pockets for storing equipment items, with configuration altered at the request of the buyer.

There are several variants of the Kora vest:

- Kora-1 - class 1 protection, developed in early 1990s.
- Kora-1M - class 1 protection, developed in 1992.
- Kora-1MK - produced as of 2024.
- Kora-1MK-SN - concealed vest variant, produced as of 2024.
- Kora-2
- Kora-3
