= Mouthwashing =

Mouthwashing may refer to:

- Rinsing the human mouth with mouthwash for purposes of oral hygiene
- Washing out the mouth with soap, a form of punishment
- Mouthwashing (video game), a 2024 psychological horror game

== See also ==
- Mouthwash (disambiguation)
