= Uncle Styopa =

Series of poems written by Sergey Mikhalkov

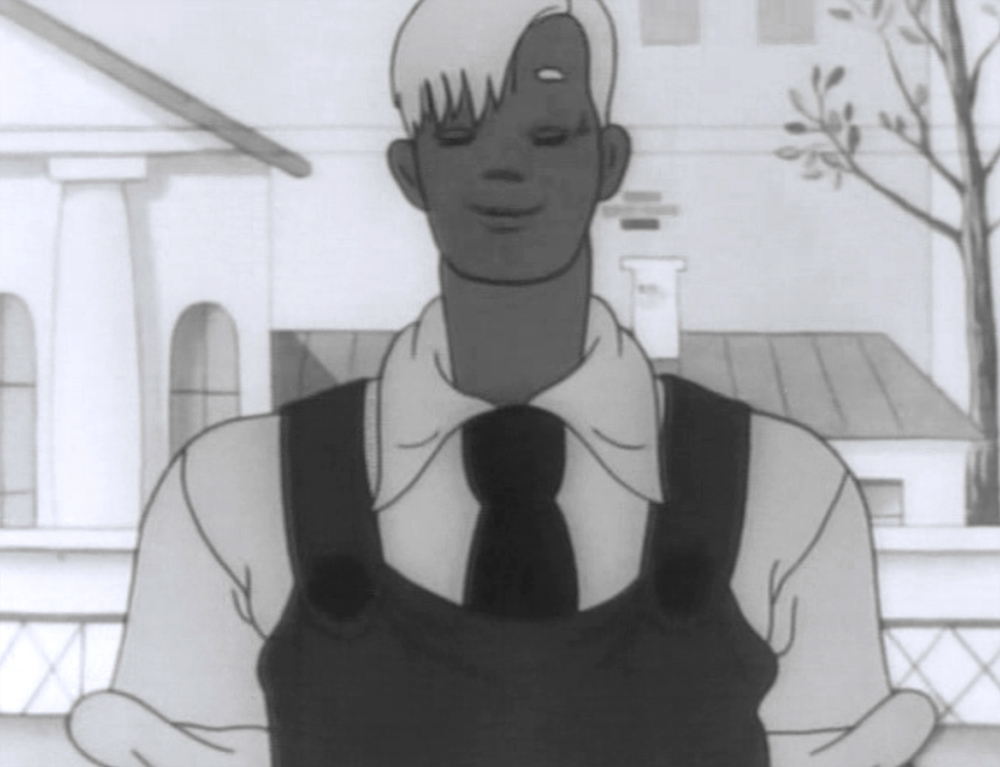
Uncle Styopa in the 1939 Soviet animated film directed by Vladimir Suteev

Uncle Styopa (Russian: Дядя Стёпа, IPA: [ˈdʲædʲə ˈstʲɵpɐ]), also known as Dyadya Stepa, Uncle Steeple and Tom the Tower, is a series of poems written by Russian children's poet Sergey Mikhalkov. They were written in trochaic tetrameter. The poems featured a brave and noble militsioner (a policeman) who was unusual due to his extreme height. The name of the protagonist of the series was Stepan Stepanov (Russian: Степан Степанов), or Styopa, which is a diminutive of the Russian given name Stepan. He performed various acts of good will, such as rescuing people, preventing train crashes, helping firefighters, stopping a school bully or working as a police officer for the Soviet Militsiya. Styopa is a wise, brave, generous, noble, fun-loving character. He fights against injustice and serves as an inspiration to the pioneers.

It was largely due to this set of poems, among others written during the 1930s in the Soviet Union, that Mikhalkov achieved fame and garnered admiration from the Soviet population. His popularity was phenomenal. Uncle Styopa's face was almost instantly associated with the face of the author. Sergey Mikhalkov himself looked like a tall athlete, and the first illustrators of the poem pictured Uncle Styopa with Mikhalkov's face. More than 250 million copies of the poems have been sold.

== Publication ==
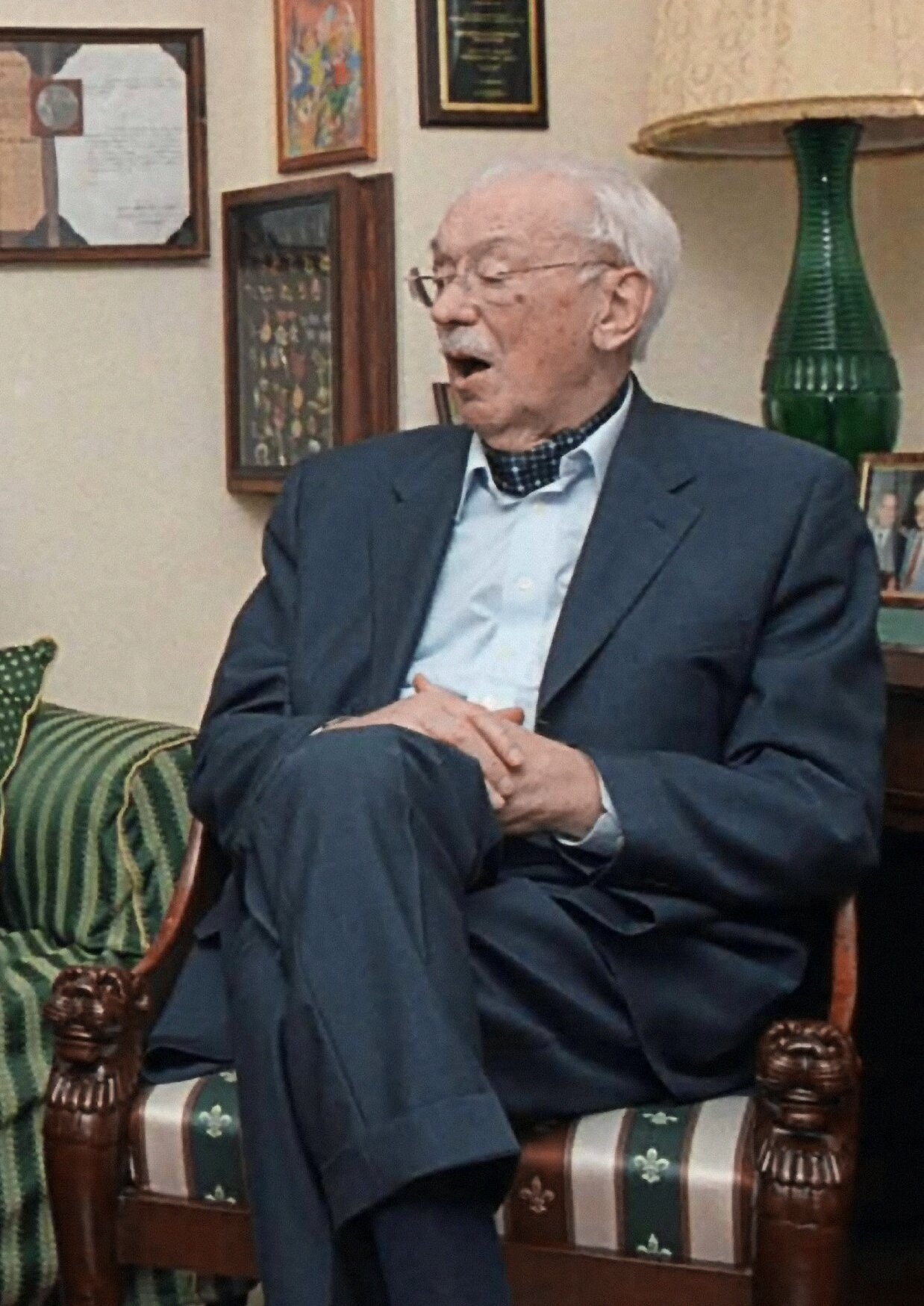
Sergey Mikhalkov, creator of Styopa

The first poem Uncle Styopa was published in the 7th issue of The Pioneer magazine in 1935. It introduced the character of Stepan Stepanov. In 1936 the poem was included in Sergey Mikhalkov's first collection of poems. The same year it was published as a single volume by Detizdat, with illustrations by A. Kanevsky. Boris Galanov wrote that Sergey Mikhalkov initially showed the poem to Samuil Marshak, who approved of it and inspired Mikhalkov to continue working on the series, and it was the only reason that Mikhalkov didn't think of Uncle Styopa a passing episode in his career.

The next poem Uncle Styopa The Militsioner (Russian: Дядя Стёпа — милиционер) was released in 1954. It was published in the 20th issue of The Pogranichnik, and in Pionerskaya Pravda (as of 10 December 1954), illustrated by E. Shcheglov. It was also published in the 12 December issues of the magazines Novy Mir and The Pioneer illustrated by V. Suteev. In 1955 it was released as a single volume by Detgiz with the illustrations of G. Mazurin. In the preface to The Pioneer's edition Mikhalkov revealed that he decided to come back to the character after 19 years because of an accidental meeting with some police officer in Moscow: "Fifteen years ago I got my driver's license and since then I've been a driver. Once, while driving on the street in Moscow, I committed a traffic offence. I stopped my car in the wrong place, at the footpath. I was approached by a police officer. Imagine my surprise when I saw my "uncle Styopa" in the uniform. The officer was very tall, the tallest of all the officers I have seen in my life! Very politely, in a civilized manner, Uncle Styopa asked me to show my driver's license and never to violate rules of the road again. I apologized and promised to be careful next time. We got into conversation. It turned out that Uncle Styopa served in the Navy before becoming a police officer. I was amazed at this! My Uncle Styopa, the character I wrote about nineteen years ago in a fun poem for the children, served in the Navy too! <…> And now I've decided to write a sequel to my fun little book."

The third poem Uncle Styopa and Yegor (Russian: Дядя Стёпа и Егор) was published in Pravda on 27 December 1968. It was released as a single volume by Detskaya Literatura in 1969, with illustrations by Yuvenaliy Korovin. It introduced Styopa's son named Yegor, "a new Heracles" whose birth weight was 8 kg. In the preface Mikhalkov explained that the idea came to him when he visited the kindergarten to speak in front of the children. He was asked to read Uncle Styopa. After that a boy came up to him and asked if Uncle Styopa had any children. Mikhalkov did not know how to reply, because it was "hard to say no", and he decided to write about Uncle Styopa's son.

The final poem Uncle Styopa The Veteran (Russian: Дядя Стёпа — ветеран) was published in Pravda on 1 June 1981, and in the 10th issue of Murzilka (1981). It was released as a single volume by Detskaya Literatura in 1985, with illustrations by Yuvenaliy Korovin.

Also, a poem was published in 1940, called "Uncle Styopa in the Red Army" (Дядя Стёпа в Красной Армии), telling of Styopa's participation in the Polish campaign. The poem was heavily laden with wartime propaganda, and had fallen into obscurity.

== Plot ==
1939 Uncle Styopa film

Uncle Styopa begins with the description of a "gigantic" man Stepan (Styopa), nicknamed "Fire Tower" due to his height. The first part of the poem focuses on Styopa's struggles with his height, e.g. he cannot enjoy shooting galleries in amusement parks because he can easily touch the targets with his hand. He wears 45th size boots and always buys the trousers "of previously unheard width". He orders double portions for lunch, does not fit into a bed, and has to sit on the floor at the cinema. However Styopa is a kind person and "all children's best friend". He rescues a drowning boy and saves pigeons from a burning house by reaching for the attic and opening the window. Styopa decides that he has always wanted to serve the country, and joins the Navy. Uncle Styopa ends with his return on shore leave. He tells stories "about the war, about the bombings, about the big battleship Marat" to the pioneers. Children change his nickname to "Lighthouse".

In Uncle Styopa The Militsioner Styopa, the former Starshina in the Navy, joins the Soviet militsiya, because he thinks that "it is important". He's respected by adults and children alike. He continues to help people: when a small boy loses his mother at the train station, Styopa lifts the child and he sees his mother in the crowd. When one of the traffic lights breaks down and this creates a traffic jam, the Road Traffic Control Department (ORUD) officer asks for Styopa's advice. Styopa reaches the light with his hand and fixes it. This earns him another nickname, "Traffic Light". He also earns the first prize in a speed skating competition, making the Militsiya proud.

In Uncle Styopa and Yegor Styopa's wife Manya gives birth to a son named Yegor. His birth weight is 8 kg. The poem follows his childhood as he makes first steps, goes to school. Yegor is not as tall as his father, but he is exceptionally strong. He is a model student who gets good marks at school, plays sports, "eats soft-boiled eggs for breakfast", and prevents arguments among classmates. As he gets older Yegor becomes famous due to his strength. At the age of 20 he wins the European Weightlifting competition and beats the European record by lifting 330 kg. He later wins the gold medal at the Olympic Games. His dream is, however, to "fly among the stars". In the end of the poem he goes through the cosmonaut training.

In Uncle Styopa The Veteran Styopa is a pensioner. He enjoys life, plays with children, and travels to France to see the Eiffel Tower. His granddaughter (Yegor's daughter) is born. Mikhalkov concludes the poem saying that logically Styopa "has to, unfortunately, pass away sooner or later", but "every reader knows" that the character will never get old and die.

== Adaptations ==
=== 1939 film ===
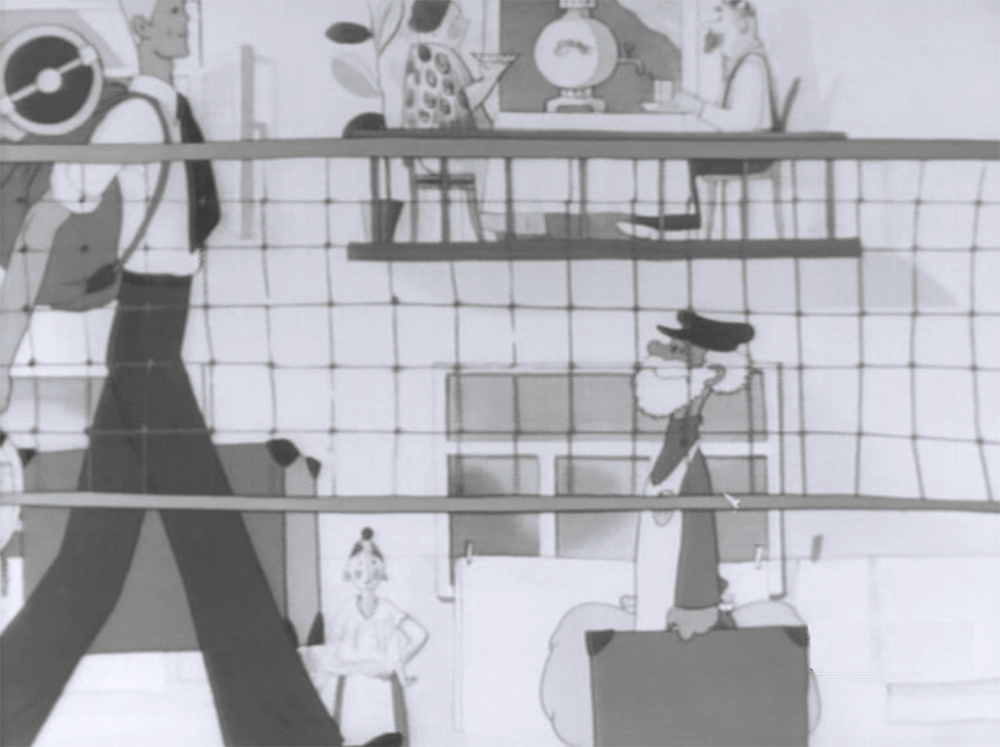
Uncle Styopa walking down the street in the 1939 Soviet animated film

A 1939 black-and-white animated film Uncle Styopa was directed by Vladimir Suteev and produced at the Soyuzmultfilm, with a script written by Nikolay Aduyev. The music was composed by Alexey Kamin. Among the animators were Boris Dyozhkin, Faina Yepifanova, Lidiya Reztsova, Fyodor Khitruk, and Anna Shchekalina. It was one of the earliest Soyuzmultfilm's animated films.

=== 1964 film ===
Uncle Styopa The Militsioner was adapted into the popular animated film with the same name in 1964, also known as Uncle Stiopa the Militiaman. It was directed by Ivan Aksenchuk and art director Leonid Shvartsman with the music composed by Aleksandr Lokshin. Among the animators were Anatoly Abarenov, Boris Butakov, Mikhail Botov, Yury Butyrin, Alexander Davydov, Sergey Dyozhkin Lidiya Reztsova, and Konstantin Chikin.

Voice cast:

- Valentina Sperantova as Narrator
- Vladimir Troshin as Uncle Styopa
- Sergey Tseits as the Road Traffic Control Department officer; the school bully; crowd
- Klara Rumyanova as children; shop assistant; the woman on the street
- Yulia Yulskaya as the old woman
- Margarita Korabelnikova as children

=== Other adaptations ===
Two filmstrips were released by the Diafilm (Диафильм) studio. The first, Uncle Styopa, was created by Yevgeniy Migunov in 1963. The second, Uncle Styopa The Militsioner, was created by Migunov and released in 1966.

There was a candy named "Uncle Styopa" in the USSR and Russia.

There are three sculptures of the character, in Moscow by Alexander Rozhnikov, in Prokopyevsk by Konstantin Zinich and in Samara by Zurab Tsereteli.

The video game Militsioner is loosely based on the Uncle Styopa story. It features a fictional dystopian Soviet town guarded by a gigantic policeman that the player character has to evade and escape from the town.
