= Arctic Eggs =

2024 video game

- Developer: The Water Museum
- Publisher: Critical Reflex
- Programmer: A. B. Marnie
- Artist: CDBunker2
- Composer: Cameron Ginex
- Engine: Godot
- Platforms: Windows; macOS; Linux; Nintendo Switch 2; PlayStation 5; Xbox Series X/S
- Release: Windows, macOS, Linux; May 16, 2024; Xbox Series X/S; October 20, 2026
- Genre: Cooking
- Mode: Single-player

Arctic Eggs is a 2024 single-player video game developed by The Water Museum and published by Critical Reflex. In it, the player assumes the role of a "Poultry Prepper" in late 21st century Antarctica. Having been caught trying to escape, the Poultry Prepper is sentenced to feed hungry people scattered around a fog-shrouded city. It was released on May 16, 2024 on Windows, macOS, and Linux, and was later ported to Xbox Series X/S on October 20, 2026. Nintendo Switch 2 and PlayStation 5 versions are also in the works.

Gameplay consists of control over a frying pan into which different items are dropped to be cooked. Different items have different cooking properties, and the player must cook the items they are presented with to clear different challenges.

Arctic Eggs has received positive reviews.

== Gameplay ==
In a standard PC setup, the player walks around with WASD, while the pan is controlled entirely with the mouse. With the exception of live ammunition that appears in some of the later challenges, everything dropped into the pan must remain there for the duration of the challenge. Different things have to be cooked in different ways — for example, eggs and bacon have to be cooked on both sides, while tins of fish must be heated until they pop open and the fish fall out to be cooked. Each challenge ends when everything is cooked.

Some challenges have unique elements, such as a request to cook a whole stingray, or a request to help an aspiring chef whose pan controls are inverted from the player's own. The game also has a sandbox mode, in which the player can build custom cooking challenges and attempt to complete them.

== Plot ==
The game begins with the player character being lectured by a guard for trying to escape. They are then made a Poultry Prepper and sent out into the unnamed city to cook things on request for its occupants. The people will also talk to the player, sharing surreal musings and occasional history details about the story's world.

The city is overseen by a mysterious entity known as the Saint of Six Stomachs, about whom the residents express a mixture of respect and fear. The Saint is responsible for a poultry ban, and armed guards stand around cages of chickens at various points around the city.

If the Poultry Prepper successfully cooks for enough people in the first level, additional areas open up, containing new people with more complex dish requests. One specific resident, the Poultry Peddler, appears in multiple locations, always asking if it's possible to fry eggs at the top of Mount Everest. She gets conflicting, sometimes nonsensical answers from the other residents.

Once 27 people have been fed — a number the player can check by smoking an in-game cigarette, which has the number appear on the filter — the final challenge level opens up, containing the Saint of Six Stomachs. The player must cook separate meals for successive stomachs. Once successful, they are brought to the Saint's head. There, he muses on the question of cooking eggs at the top of Mount Everest, and asks the Poultry Prepper to find out for him.

As the credits roll, a plane is shown flying over the city. There is then a cut to Mt. Everest, where the Poultry Prepper and the Poultry Peddler are standing by the wreckage of the crashed plane. The player can climb a short distance to the peak, where they find a single chicken, and can pet the chicken as the screen fades to black.

== Reception ==
Reviews have been positive, praising both the game's atmosphere and its mechanics. Zoey Handley of Destructoid wrote that "You might wonder how much gameplay you could really stretch out of a single Mario Party mini-game, but it turns out it's a lot." Writing for TheGamer, Ben Sledge described the play experience as "unsettling"; both he and Polygon's Cass Marshall wrote that the egg-flipping mechanic was unique among games they'd played.

Per TechRaptor, "Underneath all this humor and oddity is a shockingly well-made game, from Arctic Eggs' music, art design, and most importantly gameplay."

=== Awards ===
Year	Ceremony	Category	Result	Ref.
2024	Golden Joystick Awards	Best Indie Game - Self-Published	Nominated	
2025	Independent Games Festival	Nuovo Award	Honorable mention	
