= Tanuki: Pon's Summer =

- Developer: Denkiworks
- Publisher: Critical Reflex
- Platforms: Nintendo Switch; Nintendo Switch 2; PlayStation 4; PlayStation 5; Windows; Xbox One; Xbox Series X/S
- Release: November 10, 2026
- Mode: Single-player

Tanuki: Pon's Summer is a 2026 adventure and life simulation video game developed by Denkiworks and published by Critical Reflex.

== Gameplay ==
Tanuki: Pon's Summer is an open-world adventure life-sim game where the player experiences the day-to-day life of a BMX riding tanuki named Pon, who works part-time at a post office to restore his town's ruined shrine before the Great Tanuki Matsuri in one month.

Every day, excluding Wednesdays, Saturdays and Sundays, Pon must deliver packages on behalf of the Post Office. Occasionally, the recipients of said packages will ask for Pon's help with various activities such as serving drinks at the bar, chopping down and sanding wood, and fishing. To speed up the process, Pon rides his BMX bike whilst doing deliveries. The player can perform tricks (Wheelies, Barspins, Backflips, etc.) using Pon's bike for Points.

Challenges can be found throughout the island and are rated 1 though 5 stars depending on difficulty. Types of challenge include Location, Collect, Race and Points. In Location, Pon must get to the destination marked by a Torii Gate within the time limit. Collect sees Pon collecting the letters T,A,N,U,K and I, sometimes with a time limit. Race gives Pon several Torii Gates he must bike through within the time limit. In Points, the goal is to gain a certain amount of points, gained from doing tricks, within a time limit.

The player also has the option to catch fish and bugs, though the ability to do so is unlocked later on in the game. Species of fish and bugs are categorised as common, rare, epic or legendary and can be viewed via the 'Collections' page in the journal. There is a total of 32 fish, and 51 bugs to be caught.

== Development ==
Developer Denkiworks is based in Kyoto, Japan, and publisher Critical Reflex is based in Nicosia, Cyprus. The first official trailer announcing and revealing the game was released worldwide on February 2025. The second official trailer was released worldwide on June 2026. The official release date was revealed on October 2026, with console versions revealed alongside it.

== Reception ==
Reception

Aggregate scores
Aggregator	Score
Metacritic	(PC) 77/100 (NS2) 78/100
OpenCritic	85% recommend

The PC and Nintendo Switch 2 versions of Tanuki: Pon's Summer both received generally favorable reviews from critics, according to the review aggregation website Metacritic. Fellow review aggregator OpenCritic assessed that the game received strong approval, being recommended by 85% of critics.
