= Militsioner (video game) =

Upcoming video game

- Developer: TallBoys
- Publisher: Critical Reflex
- Engine: Unreal Engine 5
- Platforms: Microsoft Windows; Xbox One; Xbox Series X/S
- Release: 2027
- Genre: Immersive sim
- Mode: Single-player

Militsioner is an upcoming 2027 immersive sim video game for Microsoft Windows, Xbox One and Xbox Series X/S developed by Russian developer TallBoys and published by Critical Reflex.

== Gameplay ==
The player takes control of a character in a town in Russia who is watched by a giant policeman. The player's goal is to try to escape from the town and avoid being discovered by the giant policeman and being arrested. The player can use a microphone for talking in conversations.

== Development ==
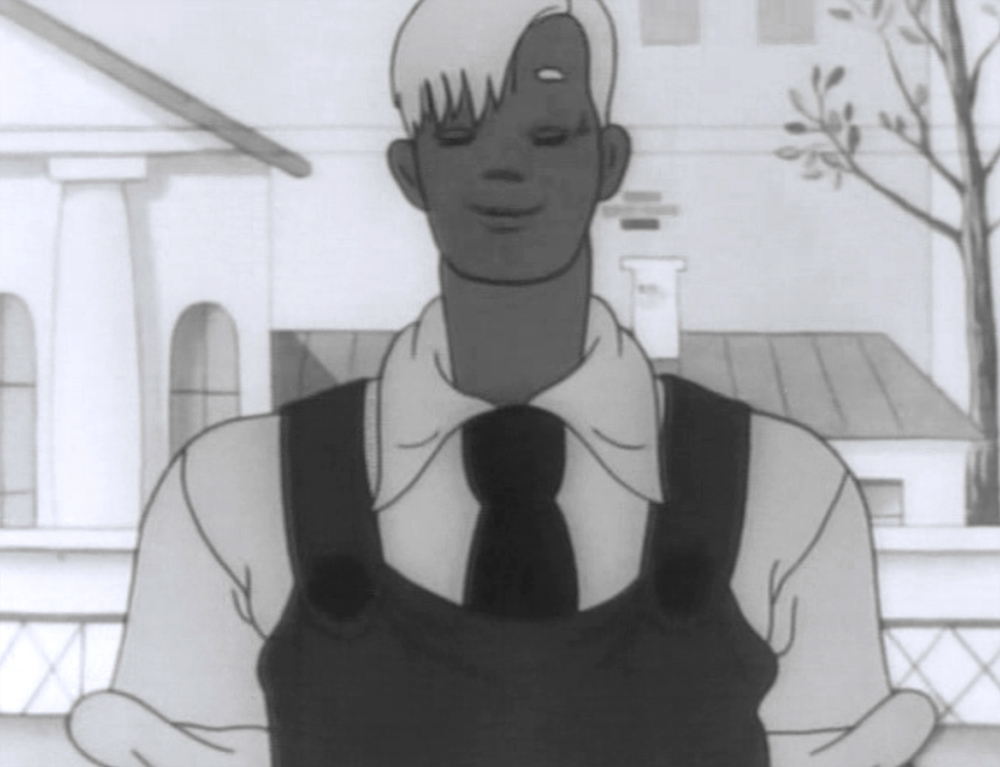
Uncle Styopa, who the giant policeman has been compared to

When a trailer was published in September 2020 on Twitter it went viral. In the Russian-speaking media, it was criticized for being Russophobic and the giant policeman was compared to Uncle Styopa. Game designer Vladimir Semenets said he does not want to create an evil image about police but wants to tell a story about life in Russia, he also mentioned issues about responsibility and power.

Inspirations for Militsioner comes from the books Crime and Punishment, The Trial and films directed by Andrei Tarkovsky and Nikita Mikhalkov.

A two-week open playtest of the game began on 20 August 2025, was extended 15 days and ended on 18 September 2025.
