= Critical Reflex =

Cypriot video game publisher

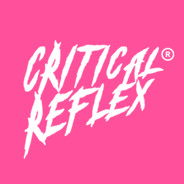
- Founded: 2020; 6 years ago
- Founders: Rita Lebedeva
- Headquarters: Limassol, Cyprus
- Website: criticalreflex.com

Critical Reflex is an independent video game publisher based in Nicosia, Cyprus. The studio published games such as Mouthwashing, No, I'm not a Human, Arctic Eggs and Buckshot Roulette. They are widely recognised for "creepy" and "surreal" aesthetic of their games.

== History ==
Critical Reflex was founded in 2020, as a video game publisher that focuses on "experimental, atmospheric, genre-bending titles". The CEO of the company describes it as a publisher that wants to promote a developer's vision long-term, that makes projects "from fans, for fans".

On 20 October 2023, Critical Reflex, a sub-label company CR Channel focused on working with horror games, now included games such as Drowned Lake, Teleforum, Buckshot Roulette and Flawless Abbey. CR Channel was described by company as "haunted television broadcast you tune into by accident at midnight".

On 5 April 2024, the company released a game called Buckshot Roulette on Steam, that originally started as an indie game on Itch.io by Estonian developer Mike Klubnika. The game quickly attracted mass attention, collecting more than 6,000 reviews in 4 days on Steam, with 96% of them being positive, and peaking over 75,000 viewers on Twitch upon its launch.

On 26 September 2024, the video game Mouthwashing developed by Wrong Organ was published on Steam. The game has collected about 1,500 positive reviews in 9 days, achieving a user score of 9.0 on Metacritic, being one of the highest-rated games of 2024. By 20 February 2024, the game has sold 500,000 copies on Steam, winning "Best Narrative" and "Players' Choice" categories in The Horror Game Awards 2024.

== List of published video games ==
Year	Title	Developers	Platform(s)
2021	Aeon Drive	2Awesome Studio	Windows, PlayStation 4, PlayStation 5, Xbox One, Xbox Series X/S, Nintendo Switch
2022	How Fish Is Made	Wrong Organ	Windows
2022	ORX	johnbell	Windows
2023	Teleforum	Monumental Collab	Windows, macOS
2023	Lunacid	KIRA LLC	Windows
2024	Outcast Tales: The First Journey	Hardlane Studio	Linux, Windows, macOS
2024	Buckshot Roulette	Mike Klubnika	Windows, Linux, Xbox One, Xbox Series X/S, Nintendo Switch, PlayStation 4, PlayStation 5
2024	Arctic Eggs	The Water Museum	Windows, macOS, Linux, Xbox Series X/S, Nintendo Switch, PlayStation 5
2024	Mouthwashing	Wrong Organ	Windows, Nintendo Switch, PlayStation 4, PlayStation 5, Xbox Series X/S
2024	Threshold	Julien Evieillé	Windows
2025	TROLEU	andrground	Windows
2025	No, I'm Not a Human	Trioskaz	Windows, macOS, Nintendo Switch, PlayStation 5, Xbox Series X/S
2025	Eclipsium	Housefire	Windows
2025	Carimara: Beneath the Forlorn Limbs	Bastinus Rex	Windows, macOS
2026	Burden Street Station	IODINE	Windows
2026	Deadlock Station	Lucorix Games	Windows
2026	Cucina Stellata	Filthy Eden	Windows
2026	Tanuki: Pon's Summer	Denkiworks	Windows, Nintendo Switch, Nintendo Switch 2, PlayStation 4, PlayStation 5, Xbox One, Xbox Series X/S
2027	Militsioner	TALLBOYS	Windows, Xbox One, Xbox Series X/S
2027	Being and Becoming	Ichthys	Windows, Nintendo Switch, PlayStation 5, Xbox Series X/S
2027	Inkblood	Hey Bird!	Windows, Nintendo Switch, PlayStation 5, Xbox Series X/S
TBA	SCP:Valravn	Subtle Bravado Studios	Windows
TBA	Drowned Lake	Monumental Collab	Windows, Xbox Series X/S
TBA	HEAVY AS STONE	jøy	Windows, Xbox Series X/S
TBA	Altered Alma	2Awesome Studio	Windows, Nintendo Switch, PlayStation 5, Xbox Series X/S
TBA	GIMMIKO	SorryPoniko!	Windows
TBA	IRONHIVE	Wondernaut Studio	Windows
TBA	Regular Home Renovation Simulator	Substandard Shrimp	Windows
TBA	IDET	Deblue	Windows
TBA	Freaked Fleapit	Finch Bird Studio	Windows
TBA	Flawless Abbey	Bed Head Games	Windows
TBA	Complex SKY	Momosundeass	Windows
TBA	GRINDSET T.V.	INFINITE ANIMAL	Windows
TBA	amFM	Calvin “Prox” Klein	Windows, Xbox Series X/S
TBA	Pipes.exe	Moving Pieces Interactive	Windows, Xbox Series X/S
TBA	Tiny Chills - Not From Ear	Ducktopus Games	Windows
TBA	Grobnopolis | Last Days	BananaDevJeff	Windows
TBA	KEYCRUNCHER	Sunscorched Studios	Windows, Xbox Series X/S
