= Sergey Mikhalkov =

Russian writer (1913–2009)

- Сергей Михалков
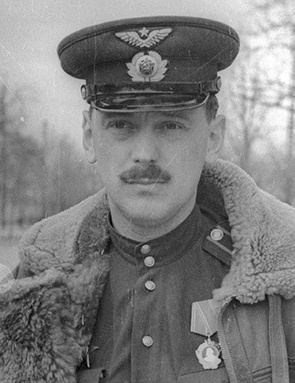
- Mikhalkov in 1944
- Born: 13 March 1913; Moscow, Russia
- Died: 27 August 2009 (aged 96); Moscow, Russia
- Resting place: Novodevichy Cemetery
- Occupations: Chairman of the Union of Writers of the RSFSR, writer and lyricist, playwright
- Known for: Writing the lyrics for the Soviet and Russian national anthems
- Spouses: Natalia Konchalovskaya (m. 1936; died 1988); Yulia Subbotina (m. 1997)
- Children: Nikita; Andrei
- Relatives: Mikhail Mikhalkov (brother)
- Awards: Hero of Socialist Labour, Order of St. Andrew

Sergey Vladimirovich Mikhalkov (Note: In this name that follows East Slavic naming customs, the patronymic is Vladimirovich and the family name is Mikhalkov.) (Russian: Сергей Владимирович Михалков; 13 March [O.S. 28 February] 1913 – 27 August 2009) was a Russian author of children's books and satirical fables. He wrote the lyrics for the Soviet and Russian national anthems.

== Life and career ==
Sergey was born in Moscow, into the noble Mikhalkov family, as the son of Vladimir Aleksandrovich Mikhalkov and Olga Mikhailovna (née Glebova). Since the 1930s, he has rivaled Korney Chukovsky, Samuil Marshak and Agniya Barto as the most popular poet writing for Russophone children. His poems about enormously tall "Uncle Styopa" ("Дядя Стёпа") enjoyed particular popularity. Uncle Styopa is a friendly policeman always ready to rescue cats stuck up trees, and to perform other helpful deeds. In English, his name translates as Uncle Steeple. As a 29-year-old in 1942, Mikhalkov's work drew the attention of the Soviet Union's leader Joseph Stalin, who commissioned him to write lyrics for a new national anthem. At the time, the country was deeply embroiled in World War II and Stalin wanted a more patriotic theme for the national anthem, to replace The Internationale.

Mikhalkov penned words with writer El-Registan (1899–1945) to accompany a musical score by the composer Alexander Alexandrov (1883–1946) that became known as State Anthem of the Soviet Union. The new anthem was presented to Stalin in the summer of 1943 and was introduced as the country's new anthem on 1 January 1944.

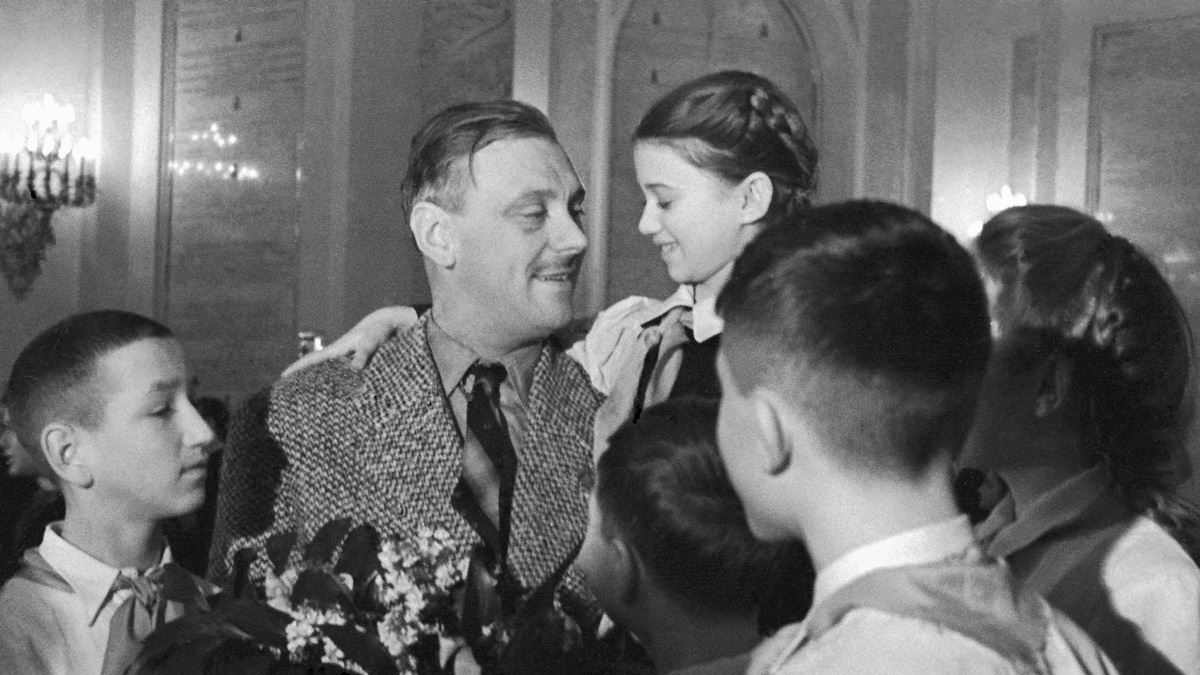
Mikhalkov in 1954

Upon the death of Stalin in 1953, the lyrics, which mentioned him by name, were discarded during the process of de-Stalinization and the anthem continued to be used without words. Mikhalkov wrote new lyrics in 1970, but they were not submitted to the Presidium of the Supreme Soviet until 27 May 1977. The new lyrics, which removed any reference to Stalin, were approved on 1 September and were made official with the printing of the new Soviet Constitution in October 1977.

During the Soviet era, Mikhalkov and his wife, Natalia Konchalovskaya, sometimes worked for the KGB, for example by presenting undercover KGB staff officers to foreign diplomats, as in the case of French ambassador Maurice Dejean, who was compromised by the KGB in the 1950s. His younger brother Mikhail Mikhalkov was also a notable writer as well as a KGB agent.

Use of the Soviet anthem, with Mikhalkov's lyrics, continued until 1991, when it was retired by President Boris Yeltsin after the USSR dissolved. However, when Vladimir Putin took over from Yeltsin in 2000, he began to clamor for a restoration of Alexandrov's music in place of Yeltsin's choice.

Mikhalkov was 87 years old by this time and long since retired; in fact, younger Russian generations likely knew him better as the father of popular filmmakers Nikita Mikhalkov and Andrei Konchalovsky, the latter of which had dropped part of his name "Mikhalkov-Konchalovsky" when he left Russia. But when Putin's push to restore the old anthem began to pick up momentum, Mikhalkov decided to write new lyrics to go with Alexandrov's score. The result was the National Anthem of Russia, which was officially adopted on 30 December 2000.

Apart from the national anthem, Mikhalkov produced a great number of satirical plays and provided scripts for several Soviet comedies. He also successfully revived a long derelict genre of satirical fable. He was awarded three Stalin Prizes (1941, 1942, 1950) and numerous other awards.

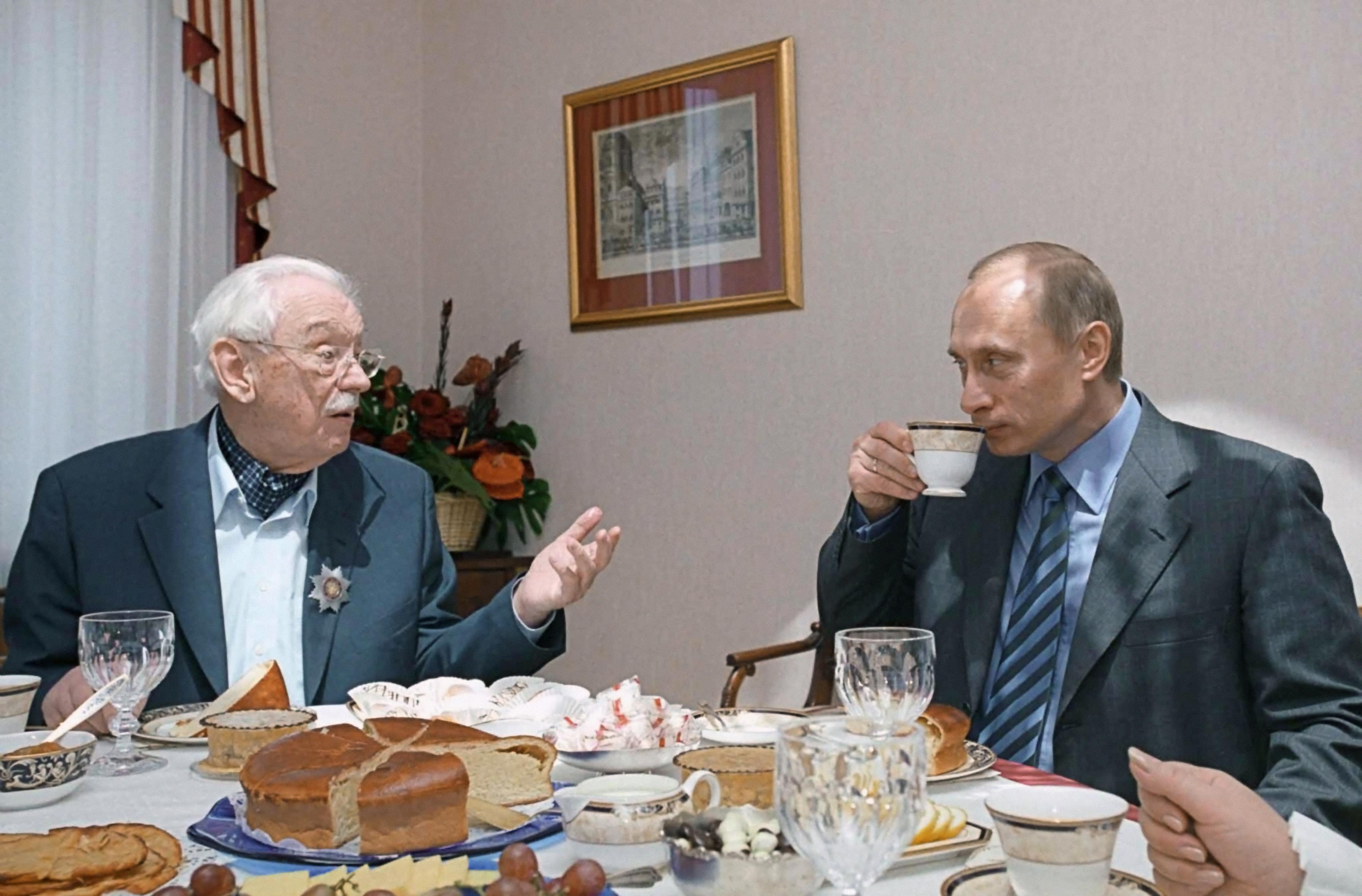
Mikhalkov with Vladimir Putin, March 2003

On Mikhalkov's 90th birthday in 2003, Putin personally visited him at his home in Moscow to present him with the Order "For Merit to the Fatherland", 2nd class, citing him for his contributions to the culture of Russia. Mikhalkov was also decorated with a Hero of Socialist Labour and the Order of Lenin, among others, for his work during the Soviet period.

Mikhalkov died in Moscow on 27 August 2009, at the age of 96. His funeral, held at the Cathedral of Christ the Saviour, was attended by family, friends, and government officials. He was buried at Novodevichy Cemetery in Moscow with full military honors.

== Personal life ==
In 1936, Mikhalkov married Natalia Petrovna Konchalovskaya (1903–1988), granddaughter of Vasily Surikov. They remained married for 53 years until her death. In 1997, Mikhalkov married physics professor Yulia Valeryevna Subbotina.

== Honours and awards ==
=== Russian Federation ===
- Order of St. Andrew (13 March 2008) – the highest Russian honour; for outstanding contributions to the development of national literature and for many years of creativity and social activities.
- Order "For Merit to the Fatherland", 2nd Class (13 March 2003) – for outstanding contributions to the development of national culture.
- Order of Honour (13 March 1998) – for great personal contributions to the development of domestic multi-national culture.
- Order of Friendship (20 February 1993) – for great personal contributions to the development of arts and literature, and the strengthening of inter-ethnic cultural relations and productive social activities.
- Medal of Zhukov
- Jubilee Medal "50 Years of Victory in the Great Patriotic War 1941–1945"
- Jubilee Medal "60 Years of Victory in the Great Patriotic War 1941–1945"
- Medal "In Commemoration of the 850th Anniversary of Moscow"

=== Soviet Union ===
==== Decorations ====
- Hero of Socialist Labour (1973)
- Order of Lenin (1939, 1963, 1973, 1983)
- Order of the October Revolution (1971)
- Order of the Red Banner (28 February 1945) – for exemplary performance in command assignments at the front in the struggle against the Nazi invaders, and for displaying courage and heroism.
- Order of the Patriotic War, 1st class (1985)
- Order of the Red Banner of Labour (1967, 1988)
- Order of the Red Star (7 March 1943) – for exemplary performance in command assignments at the front in the struggle against the Nazi invaders, and for displaying courage and heroism.
- Order of Friendship of Peoples
- Medal "For the Defence of Odessa"
- Medal "For the Defence of Sevastopol"
- Medal "For the Capture of Budapest"
- Medal "For the Capture of Vienna"
- Medal "For the Liberation of Prague"
- Medal "For the Victory over Germany in the Great Patriotic War 1941–1945"
- Medal "For Valiant Labour in the Great Patriotic War 1941–1945"
- Medal "Veteran of Labour"
- Jubilee Medal "Twenty Years of Victory in the Great Patriotic War 1941–1945"
- Jubilee Medal "Thirty Years of Victory in the Great Patriotic War 1941–1945"
- Jubilee Medal "Forty Years of Victory in the Great Patriotic War 1941–1945"
- Jubilee Medal "In Commemoration of the 100th Anniversary of the Birth of Vladimir Ilyich Lenin"
- Jubilee Medal "50 Years of the Armed Forces of the USSR"
- Jubilee Medal "60 Years of the Armed Forces of the USSR"
- Jubilee Medal "70 Years of the Armed Forces of the USSR"
- Medal "In Commemoration of the 800th Anniversary of Moscow"

==== Prizes and awards ====
- Lenin Prize (1970) – for poetry of recent years for primary-school children
- USSR State Prize (1978) – for the Russian satirical newsreel "Wick" (latest edition)
- Stalin Prize second degree (1941) – for poetry for schoolchildren
- Stalin Prize second degree (1942) – for the film script "Front-Girlfriend"
- Stalin Prize second degree (1950) – for the plays "Ilya Golovin" and "I want to go home"
- Stanislavsky State Prize of the RSFSR (1977) – for the satirical play "Foam", performed at the Moscow Theatre of Satire
- Medal of N. K. Krupskaya
- Medal of K. D. Ushinsky

=== Foreign awards ===
- Order of Saints Cyril and Methodius, 1st class (Bulgaria)
- Order of The People's Republic of Bulgaria, 1st class (Bulgaria)
- Order of Friendship (Czechoslovakia)
- Star of Peoples' Friendship, Gold star (East Germany, 1983)
- Medal "50 Years of the Mongolian People's Revolution" (Mongolia)
- Decoration of Honor Meritorious for Polish Culture (Poland)
- Order of the Smile (Poland)
- Order of Honor (Transnistria)

=== Religious awards ===
- Order of the Blessed Prince Dmitri of the Russian Orthodox Church "For mercy" (1998)
- Order of St. Sergius, 2nd Class (1993), Russian Orthodox Church (1993)

== See also ==
- Three Plus Two
