= Threshold (2024 video game) =

Psychological horror video game

- Developer: Julien Eveillé
- Publisher: Critical Reflex
- Platform: Windows
- Release: November 19, 2024
- Genre: Psychological horror
- Mode: Single-player

Threshold (stylized in all caps) is a 2024 psychological horror game developed by Julien Eveillé and published by Critical Reflex. The player controls a government employee who must regulate the speed of a train using a whistle on a tall mountain. The mountain is tall enough where oxygen is limited, so the player must refill their oxygen by breathing into limited canisters.

== Gameplay ==
Threshold is a low-poly single-player psychological horror game played in a first person perspective. The player, stationed on top of a high mountain, is a government employee tasked with regulating the speed of a train passing by. If the train falls below its expected pace, lights will flash and a siren blares; the player must blow a whistle to alert the train. Because the mountain is tall, most actions, such as running, jumping, and blowing the whistle, will consume the player's limited oxygen, leading to a progressively darker screen. Another employee provides instructions and a glass oxygen tank which the player must use; the player will splatter blood out of their mouth from swallowing shattered glass in the oxygen tank, but this does not affect gameplay. By succeeding with their shift, the player must collect tickets from a ticket machine, allowing them to purchase more oxygen tanks.

== Development ==
Threshold is developed independently by Julien Eveillé from France and published by Critical Reflex. Eveillé was inspired by the problem of pollution and the livestock industry in France. He intended to "visually represent something that looks a bit shocking, that you would remember" to contribute to this concept. Threshold was released on November 19, 2024 for Windows.

== Reception ==
The game received generally favorable reviews, according to review aggregator platform Metacritic. Fellow review aggregator OpenCritic assessed that the game received "mighty" approval, being recommended by 56% of critics.

Eurogamer found Threshold's pacing well-constructed, and enjoyed the game's mysterious worldbuilding and how it remains unexplained to the player. The gameplay loop of blowing the whistle to control the train's pace almost became a "meditative experience" to Polygon's reviewer; he described how he "fell in love" with Threshold's sound design, concluding that the game is worth replaying. Rock, Paper, Shotgun experienced significant glitches that forced them to restart five times, but found the game immersive with how they were "sucked into the rhythm" of the gameplay.

=== Awards ===
Year	Award	Category	Result	Ref.
2025	Pégases	Beyond Video Games	Nominated	
