= Driving licence in Russia =

Водительское удостоверение Driving licence
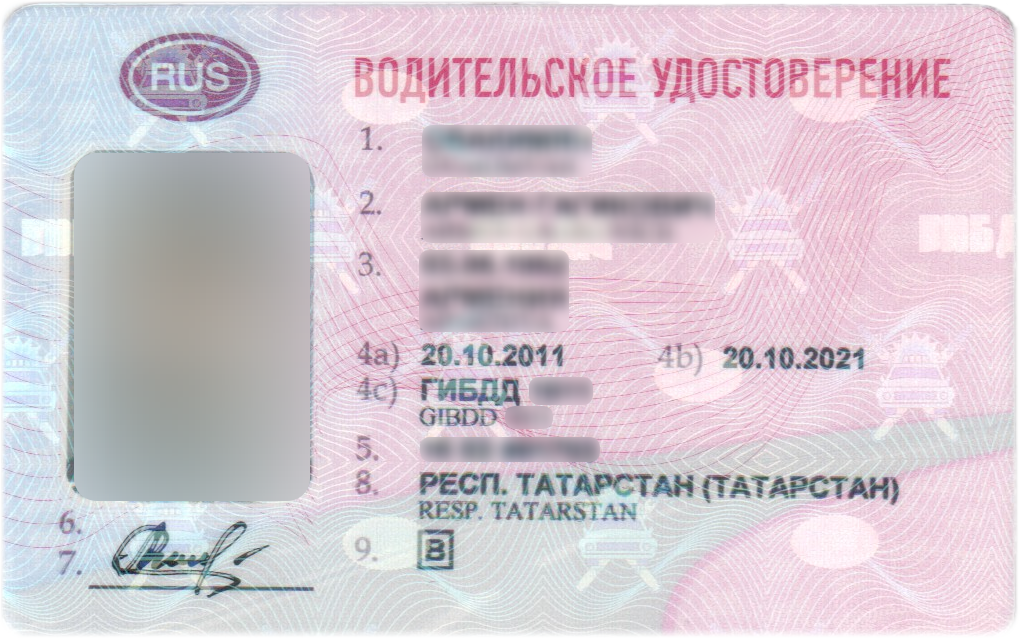
- Driving licence (front side), 2011

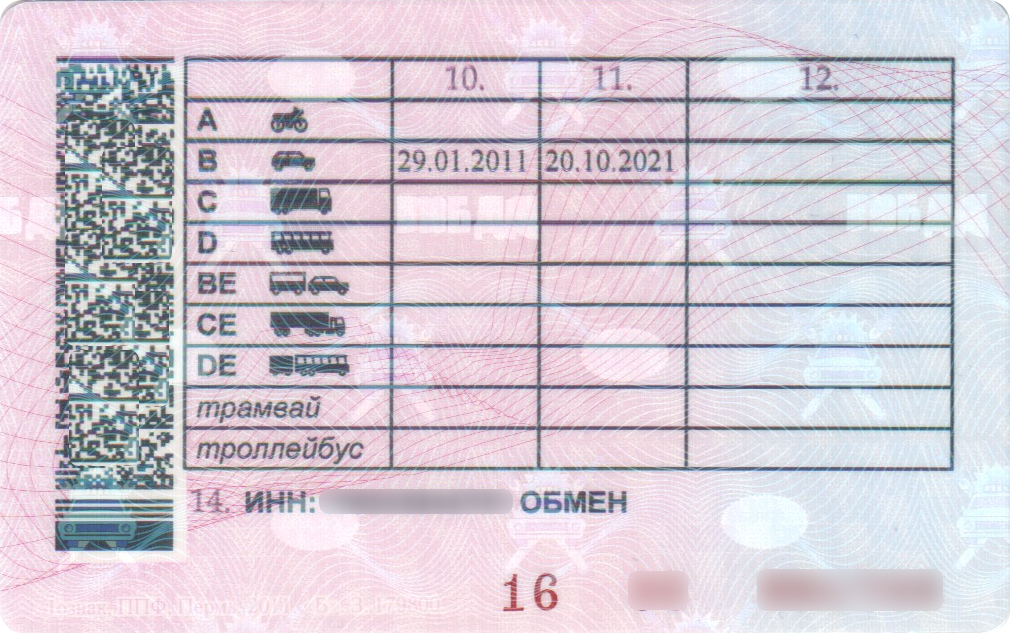
- Driving licence (reverse side), 2011
- Type: Driving licence
- Issued by: State Automobile Inspectorate
- First issued: 1900
- Valid in: Russian Federation
- Cost: ₽ 2000
- Website: госавтоинспекция.рф

Driving licence in Russia (Russian: Водительское удостоверение) are driving licences issued by the State Automobile Inspectorate which authorises its holder to operate motor vehicles on highways and other public roads across the Russian Federation. Driving licences in Russia issued since 2011, appear similar to European driving licences.

== History ==
The Russian Empire was one of the first countries to create a driving licence. Russia's first licences were issued in 1900 by Saint Petersburg authorities by the decree of the St. Petersburg mayor "On the regulation of passenger transportation by car", and Russia joined the 1909 Paris Convention. However, due to relatively small number of cars, the attempts to create a standardised Russian licence were rather sporadic and limited to major urban areas.

No comprehensive system of driver licensing was present until 1936, when the Soviet government organised and standardised traffic and driving regulations, with the state-wide system regulated by specialised traffic police authorities. In 1963, when the Soviet Union joined the Geneva Convention on Road Traffic, international driving permits were introduced in the country.

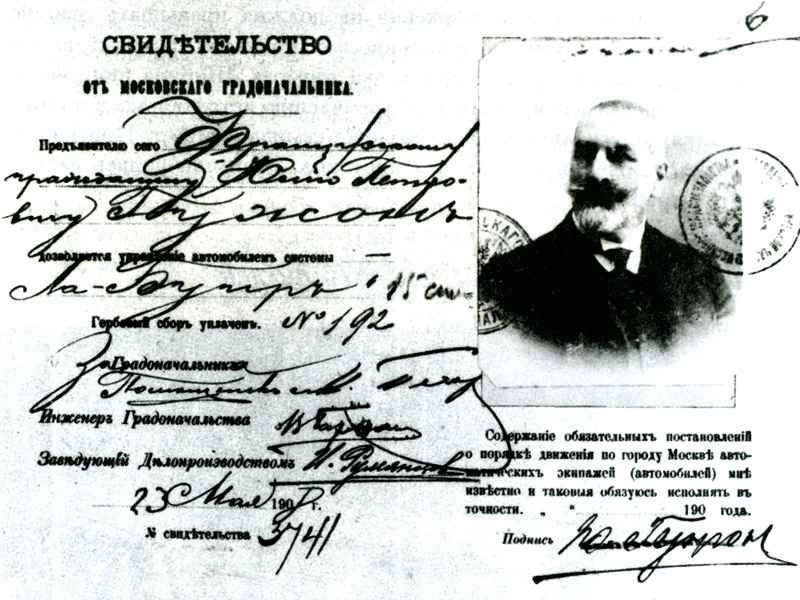
A driver's license issued in Moscow to the capitalist Yuli Gouzhon (1908). This license is tied to a La Buire automobile.

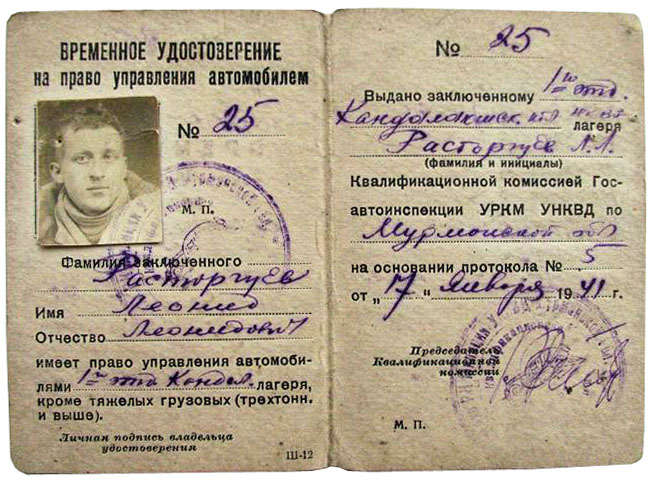
Driver's license issued to a Gulag prisoner, January 1941

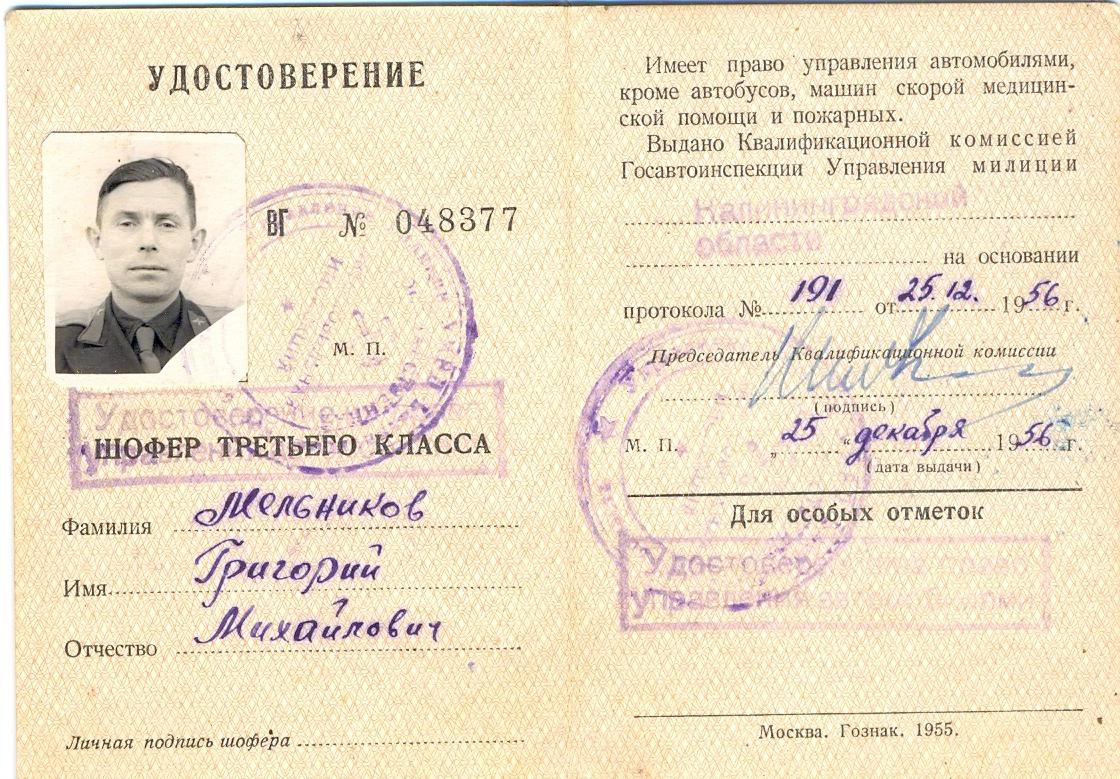
Soviet Driver's license, 1955

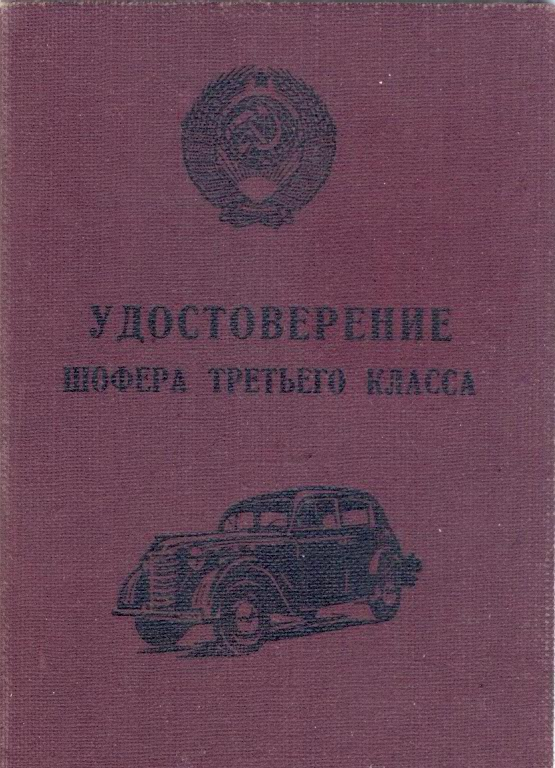
Soviet Driver's license cover, 1955

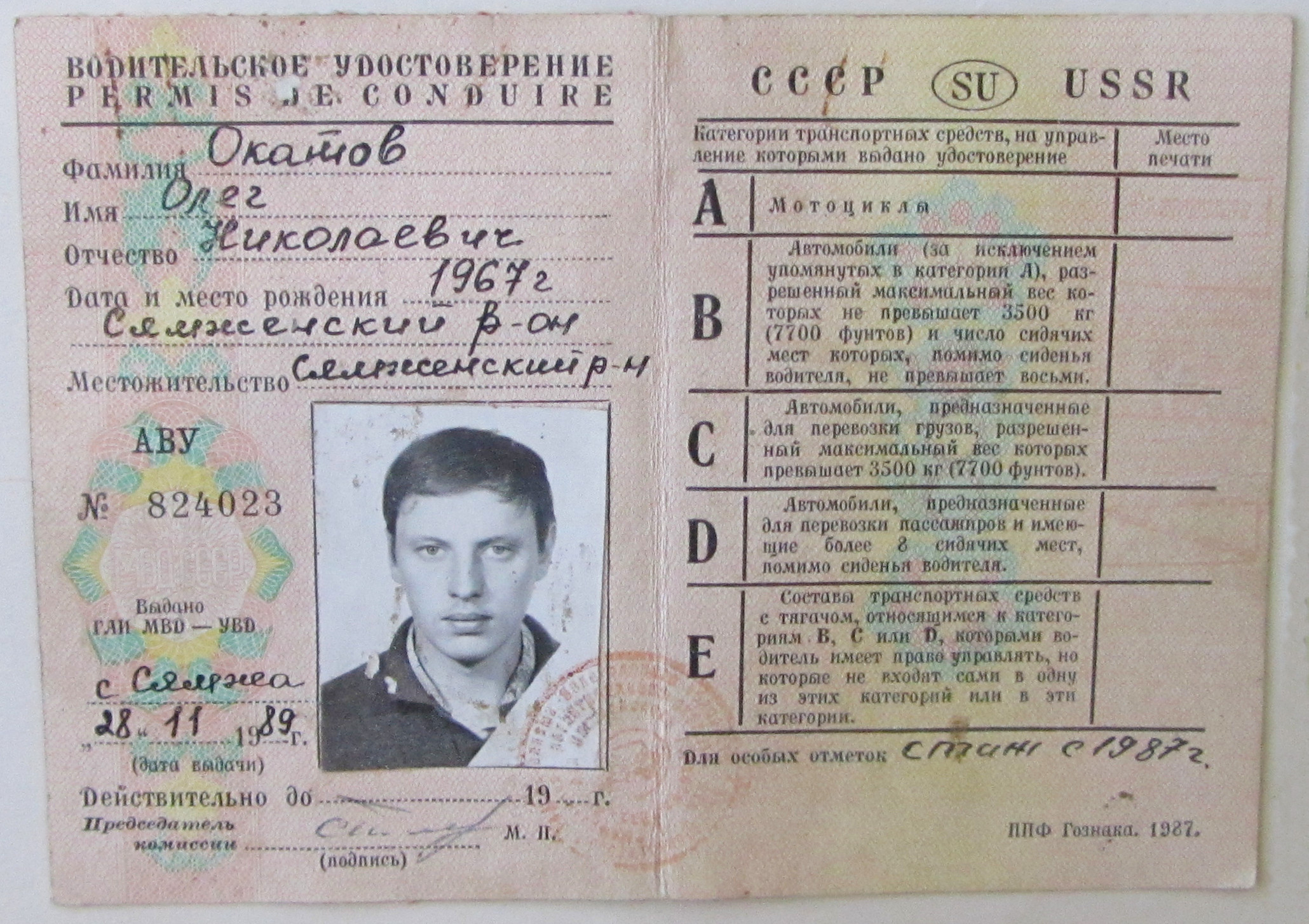
USSR driver's license, 1989

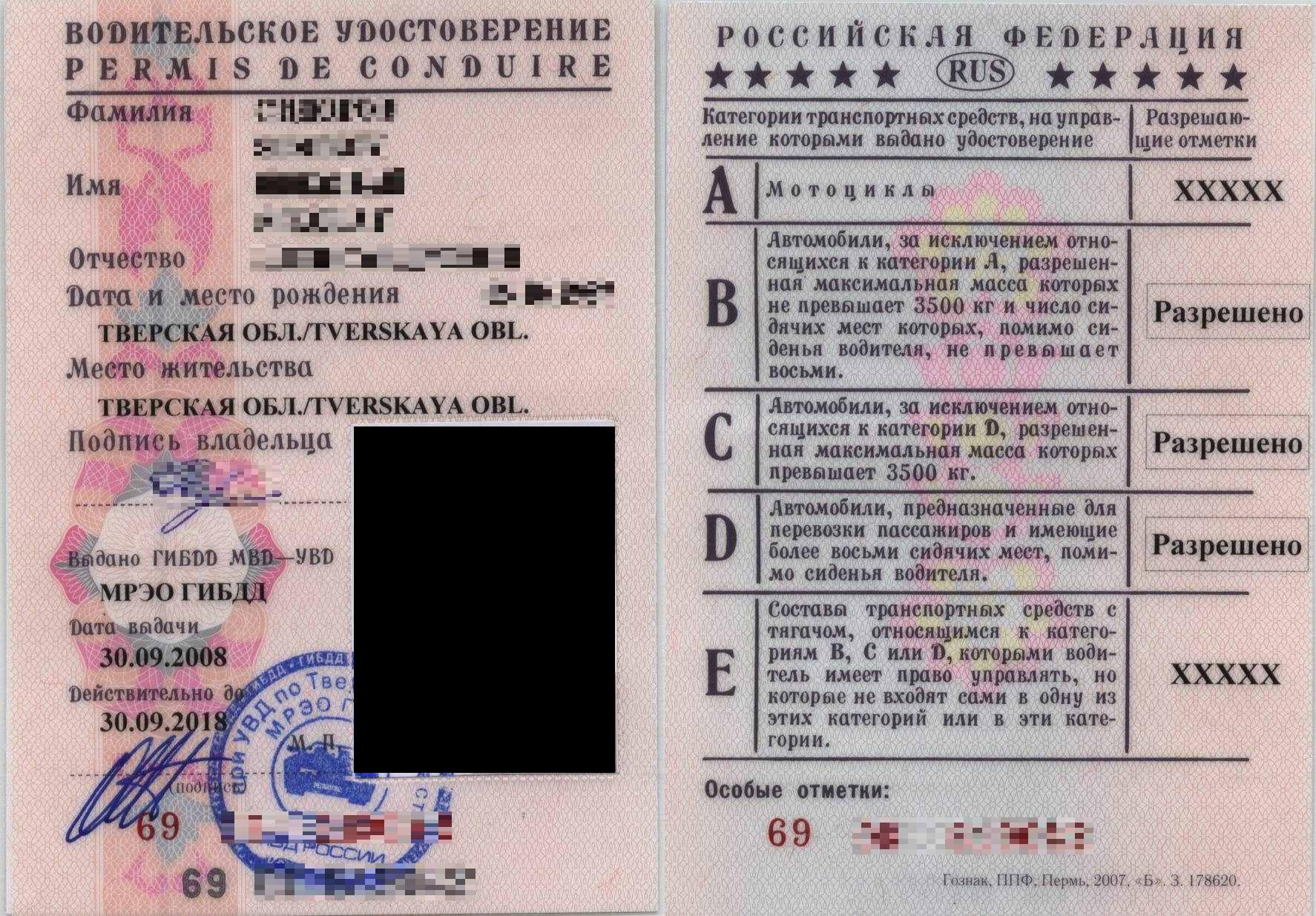
Russian driving licence (old), 2008

== Modern driving licences ==
=== Standard data field labelling since 2011 ===
Each of the data fields on the front of Russian licences since 2011 are labelled with a number, very similar to European driving licences.

1. surname in Cyrillic and Latin
2. first name and patronymic in Cyrillic and Latin
3. date of birth (dd.mm.yyy), place of birth in Cyrillic and Latin
4. a) date of issue, b) date of expiry, c) issuing authority in Cyrillic and Latin
5. licence number
6. photograph of holder
7. signature of holder
8. City of residence
9. licence categories

At the reverse of the card:
10. first issuing date of the category (in a table, listed per category)
11. expiry date of the category (in a table, listed per category)
12. restrictions (number coded, in a table, listed per category, and once for information applying to all categories)
14. space reserved for additional information

=== Driving on-road vehicles ===
Since March 2011 there are following categories that require a driving licence:

- A: any type of motorcycles
  - A1: motorcycles with engine capacity not more than 125 cc and engine power not more than 11 kW
- B: cars (automobiles) with permissible maximum weight not more than 3.5 tons and number of passenger seats not more than 8 (optionally with trailer with permissible maximum weight not more than 750 kg)
  - B1: tricycles and quadracycles
- C: trucks (automobiles) with permissible maximum weight over 3.5 tons (optionally with trailer with permissible maximum weight not more than 750 kg)
  - C1: trucks (automobiles) with permissible maximum weight over 3.5 tons but not more than 7.5 tons (optionally with trailer with permissible maximum weight not more than 750 kg)
- D: buses with number of passenger seats more than 8 (optionally with trailer with permissible maximum weight not more than 750 kg)
  - D1: buses with number of passenger seats more than 8 but not more than 16 (optionally with trailer with permissible maximum weight not more than 750 kg)
- BE: cars (automobiles) with permissible maximum weight not more than 3.5 tons and number of passenger seats not more than 8, coupled to trailer with permissible maximum weight over 750 kg but not exceed the unladen mass of the motor vehicle, where the combined permissible maximum weight of the vehicles so coupled does not exceed 3.5 tons
- CE: trucks (automobiles) with permissible maximum weight over 3.5 tons, coupled to trailer with permissible maximum weight over 750 kg
  - C1E: trucks (automobiles) with permissible maximum weight over 3.5 tons but not more than 7.5 tons, coupled to trailer with permissible maximum weight over 750 kg but not exceed the unladen mass of the motor vehicle, where the combined permissible maximum weight of the vehicles so coupled does not exceed 12 tons
- DE: buses with number of passenger seats more than 8, coupled to trailer with permissible maximum weight over 750 kg, and also all types of articulated buses
  - D1E: buses with number of passenger seats more than 8 but not more than 16, coupled to trailer with permissible maximum weight over 750 kg but not exceed the unladen mass of the motor vehicle, where the combined permissible maximum weight of the vehicles so coupled does not exceed 12 tons
- M: mopeds (small vehicle with engine capacity not more than 50 cc and with maximum design speed not exceeding 50 km per hour) and light quadracycles; this category is assigned automatically if person have any other category open
- Tm: trams
- Tb: trolleybuses

The current licence style, introduced in 2011, is a laminated plastic card similar to the European driving licence card in dimensions and outward appearance, with the bearer's photo and name (in Latin and Cyrillic scripts), place/date of issue, allowed categories, and signature. The reverse of the card features a detailed list of allowed categories. This new style is fully compliant with the Vienna Convention on Road Traffic, and therefore is acceptable in all its signatory states and countries. Older credit-card-style and booklet-style licences are also occasionally seen although they are no longer issued and are increasingly rare as a result. The Russian driving licence is also sometimes supplemented by a special card called "временное разрешение" (temporary permission), which serves for registering offense points and as a temporary licence if the primary licence has been seized by the authorities for serious traffic offences. This supplement has been abolished and reinstated a countless number of times as the views of the traffic police change.

The legal driving age within the Russian Federation is 18 years (16 for motorcycles and 20 for buses) and to obtain a licence one must be physically fit to drive (including certificates of mental fitness and no record of substance abuse). One must also pass a test administered at a local traffic police authority and pay a fee. Tests are divided into theory and practice. The theory test is usually a computerized multiple-choice test on various traffic rules. Twenty multiple-choice questions are asked, only one incorrect answer allowed in two different test topics (for a total of two incorrect answers) for a passing grade, after the main part of the test is finished, five additional questions are added for every incorrect answer, bringing a total maximum of questions to 30. Practice part of the test is divided into two parts: basic skills test conducted in an isolated area (steering, slope starting, backing-up, parallel parking and an obstacle course) and a road test conducted on public roads. Four minor errors are allowed for the road driving examination. The number of retries is virtually unlimited, but there is a mandatory grace period of one week for the first three tries and a month for any subsequent ones.

Driver's licences are issued by subdivisions of the General Administration for Traffic Safety of the Ministry of Internal Affairs and grant the right to drive on-road vehicles only.

=== Driving off-road vehicles ===
The right to drive off-road vehicles is granted by a tractorist-machinist's licence , which is issued by state inspections of the supervision of the technical condition of self-propelled machines and other machinery (these state inspections are parts of the regional governments of federal subjects of Russia and may have different names). The Ministry of Agriculture approves the form of the licence and the procedure for issuing it.

There are the following categories in tractorist-machinist's licence:

- AI: quad bikes, snowmobiles and other off-road vehicles with steering that is similar to motorcycle's steering
- AII: wheeled cross-country vehicles weighing less than 3.5 tons, including amphibious snow-and-swamp vehicles (TREKOL-39294, VIKING-29031, etc.),
- AIII: haul trucks
- AIV: off-road buses
- B: wheeled and caterpillar tractors with engine power less than 25,7 kW
- C: wheeled tractors with engine power from 25,7 kW to 110,3 kW
- D: wheeled tractors with engine power over 110,3 kW
- E: caterpillar tractors with engine power over 25,7 kW
- F: self-propelled agricultural machinery

To obtain the tractorist-machinist's licence with AII category applicant must have at least 1-year driving experience by category B of driver's licence, AIII category – category C of driver's licence, AIV category – category D of driver's licence.

For getting the tractorist-machinist's licence applicant has to pass theoretical and practice exam on the program approved by the Ministry of Agriculture. If applicant does not have the driver's licence he also has to pass theoretical exam on the program approved by the General Administration for Traffic Safety of the Ministry of Internal Affairs (knowledge of traffic rules).
