= How Fish Is Made =

2022 video game

- Developer: Wrong Organ
- Publishers: Wrong Organ; Critical Reflex
- Designers: Jeffrey Tomec; Johanna Kasurinen; Martin Halldin
- Programmer: Jeffrey Tomec
- Artist: Johanna Kasurinen
- Writer: Johanna Kasurinen
- Composer: Martin Halldin
- Engine: Unity
- Platform: Windows
- Release: 14 January 2022
- Genres: Narrative adventure; horror
- Mode: Single-player

How Fish Is Made is a 2022 narrative adventure horror game developed and published by Wrong Organ and published by Critical Reflex in which the player takes control of a sardine and explores the concept of choice through dialogue with other fish.

== Plot ==
How Fish Is Made begins with a sardine falling down a metal chute, landing in a cramped, industrial environment. The player takes control of the sardine and is given the option to engage in dialogue with a larger sardine, who asks if the player is going up or down. Other fish are encountered as the player flops through the cramped chutes and corridors, discussing the choice between up and down, providing reasoning for their own choice, or attempting to convince the player of the correct choice. The player is forced to crush a fellow sardine between the gears of a machine in order to proceed. After flopping through a dim, bloody tunnel, the player encounters a mute fish and its tongue-eating louse, who launches into a musical number over a montage of flesh and parasites. As the player moves on, the environment becomes increasingly biological, with piles of dead fish and lotus seed pods erupting from the walls. A fish tells the player how many fish have chosen to go up and how many have chosen to go down before the player is themselves presented with the choice.

== Gameplay ==
How Fish Is Made is a single-player narrative adventure game in which the player controls a low poly sardine, with gameplay limited to flopping around the environment and engaging in dialogue with other fish. The game's expansion, The Last One And Then Another, features gameplay inspired by Katamari Damacy.

== Development and release ==
How Fish Is Made was developed by art and narrative designer Johanna Kasurinen, designer and programmer Jeffrey Tomec, and audio designer Martin Halldin, all students at the Swedish game education institution Futuregames, and released on Steam and Itch.io for free on 14 January 2022. A free expansion titled The Last One And Then Another, a teaser for Wrong Organ's then-upcoming title Mouthwashing, was released in an update on 2 September 2023.

== Reception ==
How Fish Is Made attracted attention on YouTube upon release. Critics described the game as "surreal", "disgusting", and "unsettling", with critique of capitalism and the futility of choice identified as key themes. Ashley Bardhan, writing for Kotaku, said that the game was "short and crude", but that it "moved me in a way few games have this year." Joshua Wolens of PC Gamer praised the developers for their "smart, creative work", saying the game was "one of the best games I've played in months". The game's atmospheric sound design was praised for its effectiveness by Jordan Devore of Destructoid, who called the tongue-eating louse's musical number a "standout moment".
