= Mikhalkov =

Coat of arms of the Mikhalkov family

The Mikhalkov family (Russian: Михалков) is a Russian noble family, which is known from the end of the 15th century. The family can trace their aristocratic heritage roots to the Grand Duchy of Lithuania. Many members of the family worked in the Soviet Union and modern Russia.

== Notable Members ==
- Sergei Mikhalkov — the author of the National Anthem of the Soviet Union, current National Anthem of Russia, and also poetry for children;
- Mikhail Mikhalkov — the younger brother of Sergei, Soviet spy and a writer;
- Nikita Mikhalkov — an actor and a filmmaker, a son of Sergei;
- Andrei Mikhalkov-Konchalovsky — a filmmaker, a son of Sergei;
- Nadezhda Mikhalkova — an actress, a daughter of Nikita;
- Anna Mikhalkova — an actress, a daughter of Nikita.
