= No, I'm Not a Human =

2025 horror video game

- Developer: Trioskaz
- Publisher: Critical Reflex
- Director: Nikita Veter
- Designers: Nikita Veter; Roman Kozubchenko
- Programmer: Viktor Klimenkov
- Artist: Olga Shkirando
- Writers: Nikita Veter; Roman Kozubchenko; Mnim Amatarata
- Composer: Max Specter
- Platforms: Microsoft Windows; Nintendo Switch; PlayStation 5; Xbox Series X/S
- Release: Microsoft Windows; September 15, 2025; Switch, PS5, Xbox Series X/S; 2027
- Genres: Horror, visual novel
- Mode: Single-player

No, I'm Not a Human is a first-person horror video game developed by Russian studio Trioskaz and published by Critical Reflex. The demo version was published on June 9, 2025, on Steam. The full version was released on Steam on September 15, 2025, for Microsoft Windows only. The game is also set to release for Nintendo Switch, PlayStation 5 and Xbox Series X/S in 2027.

The gameplay revolves around the player in a diurnal lockdown during a solar catastrophe that has forced humanity to adopt a nocturnal lifestyle. Each night, the player must interview others who show up at their door seeking shelter. The player must determine if the interviewee is a human or a hostile "Visitor" during this interaction. If they are allowed inside the player's house, it is possible to further examine them. New ways to discern a Visitor from humans are told to the player daily. Depending on the player's actions during the game, such as killing other humans, different endings will be incurred.

The game has been applauded for its visuals and blend of gameplay reminiscent of other similarly successful games like This War of Mine and Papers, Please.

== Gameplay ==
Player talking to the guest that asks for shelter, and deciding to let them in or not

The game takes place in a world where solar activity is dramatically increasing, triggering catastrophic global warming. The player takes on the role of an unnamed male protagonist who lives in a house on the outskirts of a town. Every night, people knock on the door asking for shelter from the daytime heat, and the player must decide whether to allow them inside. The player must shelter at least one human guest to avoid being overwhelmed and killed by the predatory "Visitors", hostile beings who have begun appearing from underground and mimic humans.

The game has elements of both 2D and 3D graphics. During the day, the player can speak with house guests and examine them for signs that may indicate whether they are human or a Visitor. A new physical trait that can be used to identify Visitors is revealed each day through a television broadcast. These traits are usually circumstantial in nature and include but aren't limited to flawless white teeth, dirt under the fingernails, and bloodshot eyes. Visitors may not exhibit every trait, humans may exhibit some of the traits, and house guests do not always consent to being examined.

Each playthrough randomizes most characters between being identified as Visitors or humans, but there are a select few characters who are always human or always a Visitor. This is a deliberate design choice by the developers intended to invoke a sense of fear in the player. There are also other types of people who visit at night, such as the "Intruder" (depicted in the game's key art and based on Cormac McCarthy's Judge Holden) who will force his way into the house if the player is living alone. The player has a finite amount of "energy" each day, and in order to end the day phase, all energy points must be spent. This can be done by examining specific body parts of guests or themselves for Visitor traits, or by drinking beer to pass time. If the player needs more energy, they can order EnerJeka, a fictional energy drink, from a product delivery company called ForRest.

If there are many guests in the house, the player may not be able to examine them all each day. After each examination, the player is prompted to either kill the guest with a shotgun or listen to them explain why they shouldn't be killed. Sometimes there are direct consequences for killing humans by mistake, unlocking a possible ending. If two or more Visitors are in the house and are not killed, however, they will kill random human guests while the player sleeps.

== Plot ==
A sudden and rapid rise in solar activity has caused Earth to be severely affected by blinding light and inhospitable temperatures during the day. As temperatures are projected to continue rising and will soon reach lethal levels, the authorities (FEMA in the English translation, EMERCOM in the original Russian script) warn citizens to remain indoors during the day, causing them to adopt a nocturnal lifestyle. During the night, people begin encountering the mysterious and hostile "Visitors", who disguise themselves as humans and reportedly emerge from underground and use their appearances to gain the trust of victims and kill them. Visitors have certain physical differences that distinguish them from real humans, and the government tries to keep the population informed about these signs through news broadcasts.

The protagonist, a loner who has been avoiding the outdoors for years before the onset of the crisis, is visited by his neighbor and warned to start taking precautions, especially allowing people in need of shelter from the daytime heat to stay in his house, as Visitors seem to not attack groups of humans in a household. Over time, the solar catastrophe becomes worse and society breaks down. Massive wildfires ravage the countryside, Visitors slaughter police and military patrols, cities are quarantined, hospitals are shut down, martial law is implemented, and anti-government riots erupt. Eventually, the heat renders it too dangerous for humans to venture outdoors even at night. There are multiple endings based on the protagonist's choices and interactions up to that point. In one ending, the protagonist decides that it is too dangerous to stay on the surface, and together with people in his house goes underground, fully isolating from the outside world until summer ends, when global temperatures begin to return to normal.

== Development ==
A prototype build of No, I'm Not a Human debuted in Violent Horror Stories: Anthology, a collection of four short horror-themed games made by four different developers that released on Steam on August 6, 2024. Trioskaz, the developer of No, I'm Not a Human, subsequently announced on September 4 that they would create an "extended version" of the game with additional characters, events, and mechanics. A demo of the expanded game was released on June 9, 2025, on Steam.

== Reception ==
Reception

Aggregate scores
Aggregator	Score
Metacritic	76/100
OpenCritic	77% recommend

The game received generally favourable reviews from critics, according to the review aggregation website Metacritic. Fellow review aggregator OpenCritic assessed that the game received strong approval, being recommended by 77% of critics.

No, I'm Not a Human has been widely described as "full of feelings of fear and paranoia" with a "surreal, stylised aesthetic", causing concern about the immorality of one's own actions and offering a "deeply idiosyncratic slide into darkness". The game was also compared to Papers, Please, as "embracing and developing" the concept of a dark and tragic game with "fantastic and stylish" design. Despite featuring the themes of "squalid discomfort and smothering despair", reviewers noted that No, I'm Not a Human still encourages its players "to find connection and compassion when all hope seems lost".

By June 16, 2025, No, I'm Not a Human had been wishlisted by over 500,000 users on Steam. The full game was released on September 15, 2025. On September 19, the developer announced via a Steam News post that No, I'm Not a Human had sold more than 100,000 copies within its first week of release. On March 19, 2026, it was announced that the game has surpassed 1 million copies sold.

=== Awards ===
Year	Award	Category	Result	Ref.
2026	The Steam Awards 2025	Outstanding Story-Rich Game	Nominated	
