= Mikhail Mikhalkov =

Soviet intelligence officer and writer

Cover of the book Two brothers - two fates by Mikhail Mikhalkov shows Sergey Mikhalkov (on the left) and himself

Mikhail Vladimirovich Mikhalkov (Russian: Михаил Владимирович Михалков; 28 December 1922, Moscow – 5 September 2006, Moscow) was a writer and alleged Soviet intelligence officer working under the pen names M. Andronov (М. Андронов) and M. Lugovykh (М. Луговых). He was a younger brother of Soviet poet Sergey Mikhalkov.

== Self-presented military biography ==
Mikhail Mikhalkov was born into the noble Mikhalkov family, that was relatively wealthy even under Soviet rule. In his childhood the family kept a German governess so he had reasonable German-language skills.

His military biography is largely known from his own words and mostly lacks independent documentary corroboration, most notably his files related to his post-war arrest are not available for fact-checking.

Mikhalkov used to tell that in 1940, aged 18, he graduated from a School of NKVD Border Troops, at least in any case he was really conscripted to the border troops at the eve of the Operation Barbarossa. In September 1941 he ostensibly served in the NKVD Special Section (counterintelligence; which later became SMERSH) of the Southwestern Front under Mikhail Kirponos and was taken a POW after the collapse of Soviet defense of Kiev. Thrice he was put in German POW camps and thrice he managed to escape. Pretending to be an ethnic German from Ukraine, he managed to get a position as a kitchen hand in the 2nd SS Division Das Reich. He then escaped to Hungary, where he met a Swiss industrialist who offered him an employment. Mikhalkov worked in Switzerland, France, Belgium and Turkey but eventually managed to cross the front line in Latvia dressed in the uniform of a captain of 3rd SS Division Totenkopf he killed.

He was arrested by the Soviet military and because of the emotional stress could not speak Russian but only German, still talking through interpreters he provided important information on the position of German troops as well as to convey that he is in fact a Soviet NKVD officer, brother of the author of the National Anthem of the Soviet Union, Sergei Mikhalkov. After the confirmation of his identity Mikhail Mikhalkov was sent to Moscow where he worked as a secret NKVD agent in Lubyanka prison. He used to be sent to a prison cell, befriended the inmates, then shared the obtained information with NKVD investigators. Soon Mikhalkov himself was arrested and sentenced as a German spy.

Mikhalkov Jr. was sentenced to three years of Gulag camps and five years of exile. Afterwards he was forbidden to live in Moscow. In 1953 after Joseph Stalin's death KGB proposed Mikhalkov to write a book (named In labyrinths of deadly risk В лабиринтах смертельного риска) about his adventures during World War II. In 1956 he was rehabilitated, awarded an Order of Glory and allowed to live in Moscow. The book was translated into German and French and printed as a propaganda piece for foreign readers. The Russian original of the book was published only in 1991 with the onset of perestroika. An expanded version of the book was included into the Two brothers - two fates publication. His nephew Nikita Mikhalkov announced his intention to film a TV serial based on Mikhail's story.

After rehabilitation Mikhalkov worked in KGB offices, in the Political Department of Soviet Army and in the organization of World War II veterans.

== Criticism of wartime memoirs ==
Historian Igor Petrov has argued that Mikhalkov's wartime memoirs contain a mixture of verifiable facts, exaggerations and fabrications. According to Petrov, the most reliable sections concern the period between spring 1942 and January 1943, when Mikhalkov worked as a prisoner-of-war auxiliary in a German military hospital in Dneprodzerzhinsk. Individuals mentioned in these chapters, including former POW Dmitry Tsvintarny and members of the local underground, were real historical figures.

Petrov also considered it confirmed that in 1943–1944 Mikhalkov served as a Hiwi volunteer attached to the staff company of the Wehrmacht division Großdeutschland under Oberleutnant Otto Börsch, citing German military award documents mentioning this officer discovered during archival research.

At the same time, Petrov described many episodes from Mikhalkov's later memoirs as fictionalized or historically implausible, including claims that he operated as an independent Soviet intelligence agent under the codename Sych, met Otto Skorzeny and Walther Funk, travelled across wartime Europe on a private aircraft, formed a partisan detachment in Latvia, and wore the uniform of the SS division Totenkopf.

According to Petrov, Mikhalkov likely attempted, after the war and his subsequement imprisonment and rehabilitation, to reinterpret his experience as a German auxiliary and former prisoner of war into a narrative of clandestine anti-Nazi resistance and intelligence activity.

== Books ==
Mikhalkov began publishing poetry in the 1950s under the pseudonyms Mikhail Andronov and Mikhail Lugovykh.

By the mid-1970s, Mikhalkov had published several poetry collections and songbooks. Songs based on his lyrics were composed by Isaak Dunayevsky, Reinhold Glière, Vano Muradeli, Serafim Tulikov and other Soviet composers. According to the Russian cultural portal Kultura.RF, more than 400 songs were published using his texts.. A vinyl album of songs with Mikhalkov-Andronov's lyrics was released featuring the poet's portrait.

Much of Andronov's poetical work focused on military and patriotic themes. His best-known poem, Under Prokhorovka (Russian: «Под Прохоровкой»), became widely used in Soviet and Russian educational and commemorative materials about the Battle of Kursk. Petrov noted the irony that, according to available evidence, Mikhalkov himself participated in the battle while serving as a Hiwi attached to the staff company of the Wehrmacht division Großdeutschland.

In 1977, the magazine Moskva published the first chapters of his wartime memoirs, describing his work in a military hospital in Dneprodzerzhinsk and contacts with the local underground resistance. Additional chapters appeared in the Latvian newspaper Komunārs and in the almanac World of Adventures in 1983–1984. A complete edition of his memoirs, In the Labyrinths of Mortal Danger (Russian: «В лабиринтах смертельного риска»), was published in 1991, this time featuring his real name.

Below is a list of his verified publications, as well as unverified works that have appeared online but cannot be verified by reliable sources.

=== Verified Works ===
- Two lives (1989) (about World War II heroes P. Koshkarev and A. Romanov)
- In labyrinths of deadly risk (1991; extended edition 1996) - autobiography
- Two brothers - two fates (2005) (together with Sergei Mikhalkov) ISBN 5-9524-1884-8

=== Attributed or Unverified Works ===
- Articles of D. S. Mirsky
- F. Plevako
- Wolf Messing
- Loves and Myths of Family Happiness
- History of Brest Museum
- Front
