= Carimara: Beneath the Forlorn Limbs =

- Developer: Bastinus Rex
- Publisher: Critical Reflex
- Platforms: PC, Mac
- Release: October 6, 2025
- Genres: Point-and-click, horror
- Mode: Single-player

Carimara: Beneath the Forlorn Limbs is a 2025 point and click-horror game developed by Bastinus Rex and published by Critical Reflex. The player takes the role of a carimara, a small goblin creature who communicates through magical cards, to solve a short mystery in a dark fantasy setting. The game was well-received by critics, with reviewers praising its investigative gameplay, art and sound design, and compelling characters, although some reviewers were disappointed by its short length.

== Gameplay ==
The player plays as a carimara, a small goblin creature that cannot speak and must instead communicate using magical cards. The carimara has been enlisted by an old woman to get rid of a ghost in her basement. The player can explore the house and interact with characters and objects using the keyboard and mouse. When they interact with something, the player gains a card representing that object or character. These cards can then be used as topics of discussion with characters or to interact with the environment. The game is a short point and click mystery where the player must figure out who the ghost was and how they died. The whole game can be completed within 30 minutes to a few hours.

== Development and release ==
Carimara was developed by a solo game developer under the name Bastinus Rex. The setting was inspired by dark fantasy novels such as The Spook's Apprentice and Normandy folklore. The graphics were inspired by old PlayStation and Nintendo console games. The in-game textures incorporate photos of nature and the environmental sounds include recordings from the French countryside. Rex said the short length of the game allowed them to add more polish and hide secrets, and said they prefer creating games that are "small, inexpensive episodes". Rex announced the game in a tweet on March 21, 2025. It was published by Critical Reflex and was released on October 6, 2025.

== Reception ==
Reception

Aggregate scores
Aggregator	Score
Metacritic	77/100
OpenCritic	78% recommend

Review scores
Publication	Score
GamesRadar+	4/5
Adventure Game Hotspot	71%

Carimara received "generally favorable" reviews according to the review aggregator website Metacritic, receiving a weighted score of 77/100 based on six critic reviews. According to OpenCritic, the game was recommended by 78% of critics based on nine reviews.

The investigative gameplay was praised by reviewers. Will Aickman for Adventure Game Hotspot said the game was a "surprisingly elaborate mystery" that requires players to pay close attention and make their own connections. Robin Bea of Inverse found the gameplay "incredibly compelling" because it lacks a "smoking gun" and relies on subtle clues and gut feeling. Oscar Taylor-Kent for GamesRadar+ said the game had a dense mystery with "simple – but very satisfying" solutions. The card based dialogue was described as a unique game mechanic by reviewers.

The art style and sound design were also well-received. Reviewers described the low poly graphics and muted color palette as creating a gloomy and eerie atmosphere. Bea said Carimara's "sound and visual design are stunning, among the best I’ve encountered this year" and said they both create an atmosphere that is "unnerving but darkly beautiful". Em Stonham of The Escapist said the game had a "subtle, dread-inducing type of horror" that was "unsettling and eerie, but ... not overly scary", while Shaun Prescott for PC Gamer said it was a "subtle horror-inflected experience which leaves a lingering melancholy". Aickman praised the character designs as "exceptionally expressive" with "details [that add] depth to the setting", feeling that even friendly characters came across slightly unnerving.

A review for Famitsu said the main attraction of the game is its eccentric but compelling characters, with the reviewer stating that characters that initially seem threatening are shown to have a softer side as the story unfolds. Bea likewise felt the game subverted the horror and detective genres, with the initial tone and setup hinting towards a horrific crime, but "the final truth Carimara reveals is its surprisingly tender heart". Stonham described the story as "well-written" and "rich and rewarding". Aickman also felt the story was "complete, self-contained, and complex" but was disappointed by its short length, saying it "feels frustratingly truncated". Taylor-Kent likewise felt the game was limited in scope and said he would have enjoyed a longer game but called it "an excellent short story that's a joy to play through".

=== Year-end lists ===
Publication	Accolade	Rank	Ref.
Inverse	The 25 Best Games Of 2025, Ranked	14	

== Awards and nominations ==
Year	Ceremony	Category	Result	Ref.
2025	The Horror Game Awards	Best Art Direction	Nominated	
2025	The Indie Game Awards	Bite-Sized Game	Nominated	
2026	Pégases	Best Debut Video Game	Nominated	
