= State Automobile Inspectorate =

Russian traffic policing agency

State Automobile Inspectorate Государственная автомобильная инспекция
- Patch of the GAI

- Emblem of the GAI

- Badge of the GAI

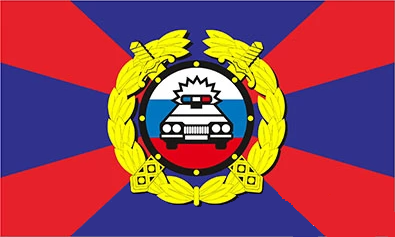
- Flag of the GAI
- Abbreviation: GAI
- Motto: Serve Russia, Serve the law

Agency overview
- Formed: 3 July 1936; 90 years ago
- Preceding agency: GIBDD

Jurisdictional structure
- National agency (Operations jurisdiction): RUS
- Federal agency (Operations jurisdiction): RUS
- Operations jurisdiction: RUS
- Area: 17,098,242 square kilometres (6,601,668 sq mi)
- Population: 143,975,923 (2015 est.)
- Legal jurisdiction: As per operations jurisdiction
- Governing body: Police of Russia
- General nature: Federal law enforcement; Civilian police
- Specialist jurisdiction: Highways, roads, traffic

Operational structure
- Headquarters: Moscow, Russia
- Agency executive: Mikhail Chernikov, Commander
- Parent agency: Ministry of Internal Affairs
- Child agencies: Road Patrol Service; • Technical Control Service; • Road Inspection and Traffic Management Service; • Traffic Safety Propaganda Service; • Auto Theft Investigation Units; • Registration and Examination Departments; Special Purpose Center for Road Safety; Federal State Institution Scientific Center for Road Safety; Directorate of the Road Safety Program

Notables
- Anniversary: 3 July

Website
- госавтоинспекция.рф

The State Automobile Inspectorate, (Note: Russian: Государственная автомобильная инспекция, ГАИ, romanized: Gosudarstvennaya avtomobil'naya inspektsiya, GAI) formerly known as Main Directorate for Traffic Safety of the Ministry of Internal Affairs, (Note: Russian: Главное управление по обеспечению безопасности дорожного движения МВД России, ГУ ОБДД, GUOBDD, or Государственная инспекция безопасности дорожного движения, ГИБДД, GIBDD) is a federal law enforcement agency of Russia specializing in traffic policing. They are responsible for the regulation of traffic, investigating traffic accidents, operating stop lights and issuing driving license in Russia.

The Administration is part of the Public Security Service of the MVD. The Administration has patrol jurisdiction over all Russian highways and roads.

== History ==
The GAI (Russian: ГАИ, IPA: [ɡɐˈi]), short for State Automobile Inspectorate (Государственная автомобильная инспекция, Gosudarstvennaya avtomobil'naya inspektsiya), was formed on July 3, 1936. The GAI was part of the NKVD. Its tasks included: preventing accidents, keeping records of them and analyzing their causes, cleaning accident scenes, arraigning individuals responsible for accidents, developing technical standards for the operation of vehicles, supervising the preparation and education of drivers, managing the issuance of license plates, filling data sheets, and searching cars.

In 1961 it was merged with the Road Traffic Control Department.

During the guerilla phase of the Second Chechen War, as well as during the Insurgency in the North Caucasus, traffic safety officers were regularly targeted by Pro-Ichkerian, and later Jihadist insurgents. They made up a large portion of the law enforcement and Russian government casualties, in addition to FSB, MVD, and GUOOOP members who were assassinated or otherwise killed in action.

After the dissolution of USSR, GAI was renamed GIBDD - General Administration for Traffic Safety. There were rumors from March 2017 that the GIBDD was about to be dissolved until December 2018, as part of Russian police reform and would be merged into the patrol service of the police. The Minister of Internal Affairs denied those rumors.

On May 28, 2024 GIBDD was renamed back to GAI.

== Structure and organisation ==
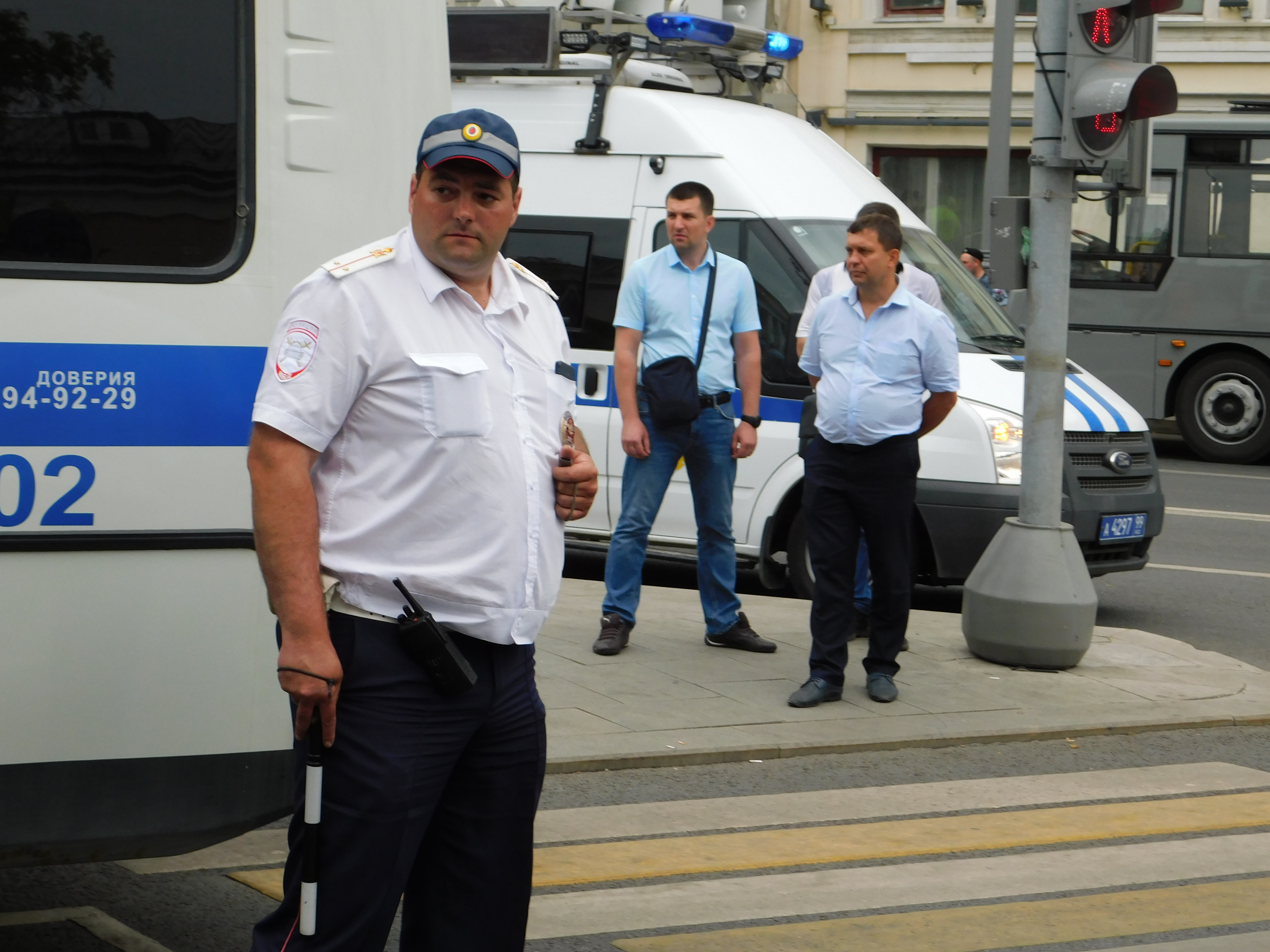
Traffic police officer in Russia

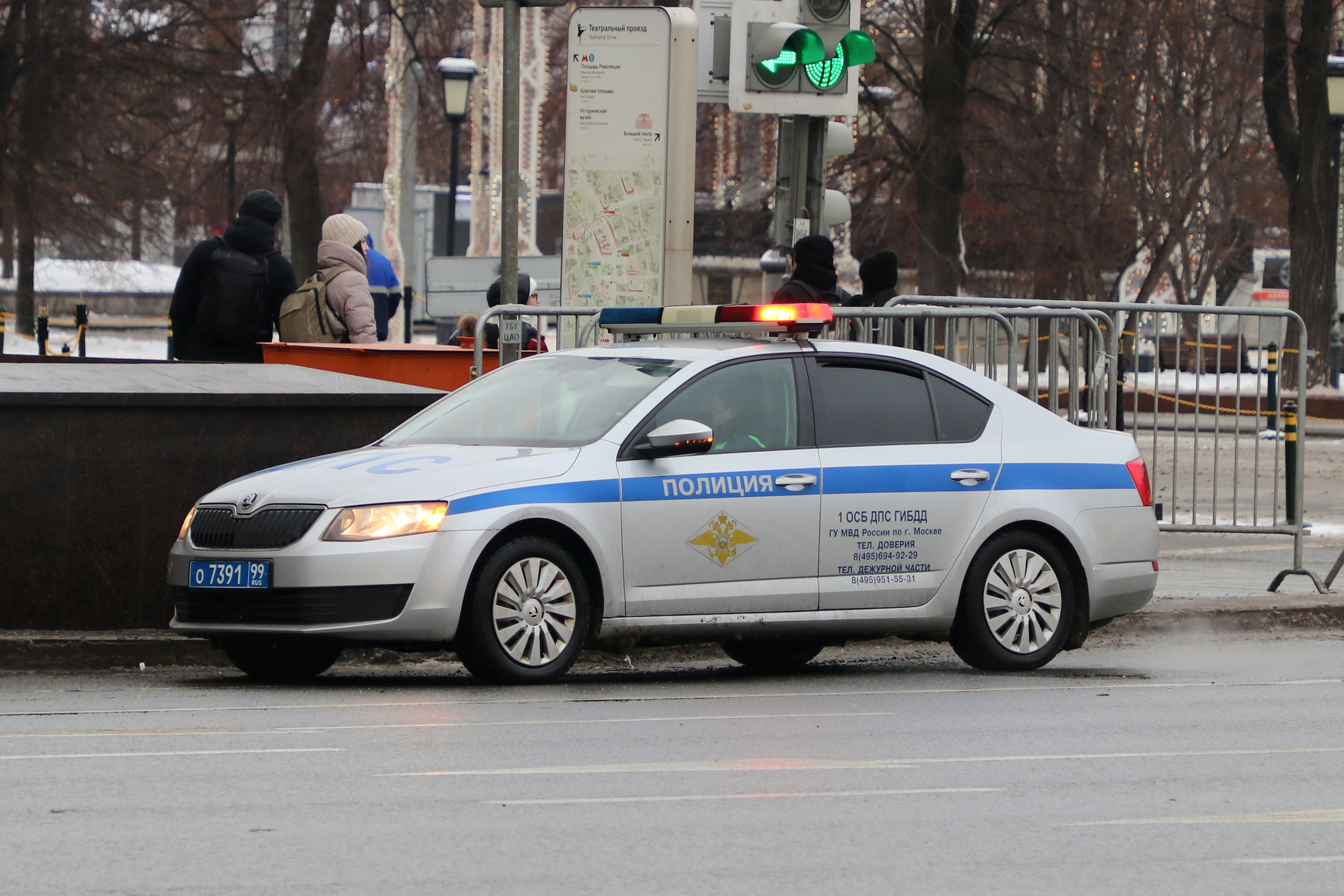
State Automobile Inspectorate patrol in Russia

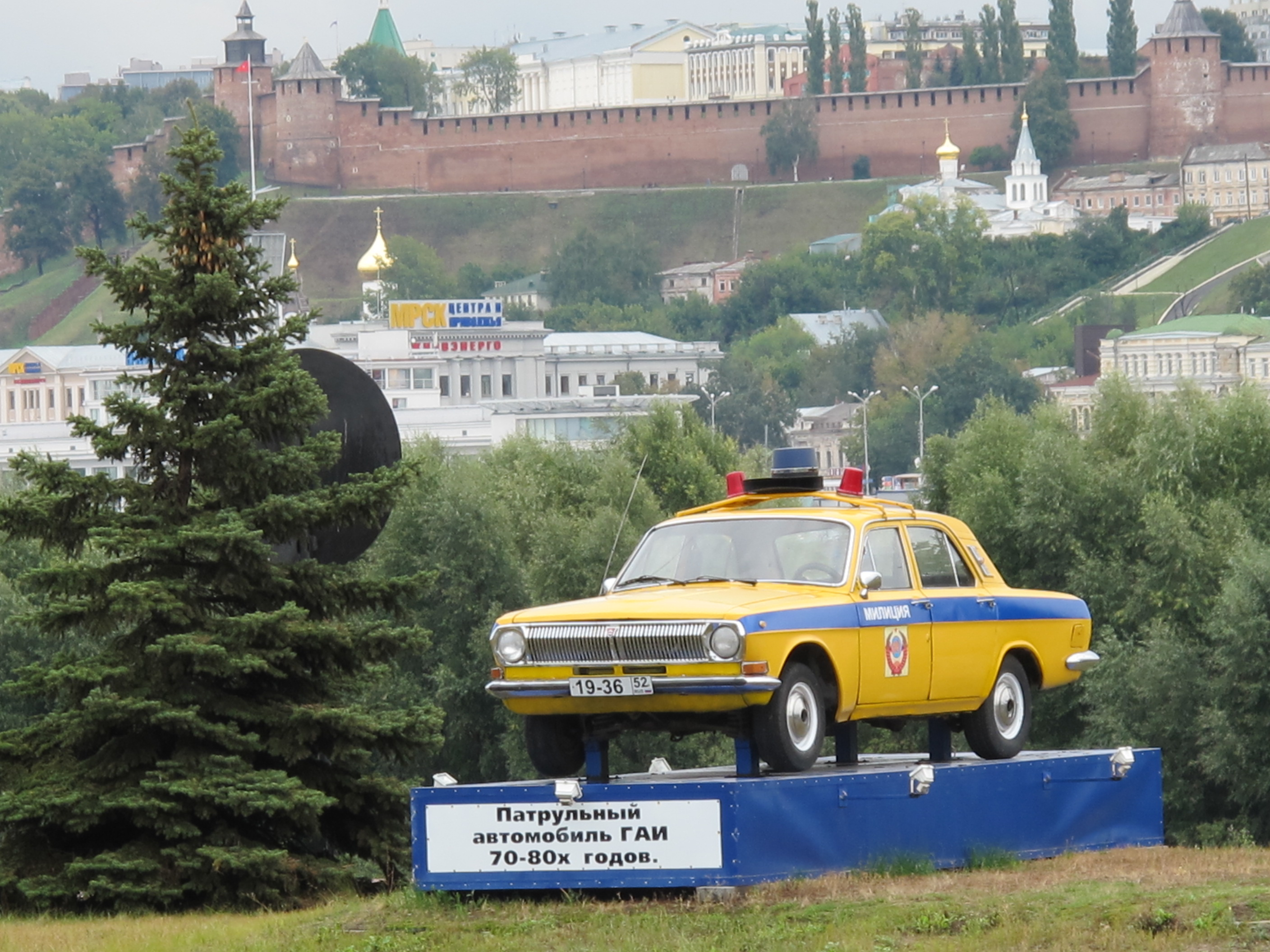
A 1970s/80s-vintage GAZ-24 Volga, in the period squad car livery, installed as a monument in front of the Nizhny Novgorod General Administration for Traffic Safety headquarters.

Roads Patrol Service (Дорожно-патрульная служба)

- Roads Inspection and Traffic organisation Service (Служба дорожной инспекции и организации движения)
- Inspection and registration (Служба технического осмотра и регистрации)
- Investigation Division vehicles (Подразделения розыска автотранспорта)

== Other names ==
- Department for Ensuring Road Traffic Safety of MVD of Russia (Russian: Департамент обеспечения безопасности дорожного движения МВД России, ДОБДД) abbreviated as DOBDD, since 1994
- State Inspectorate for Road Traffic Safety (Russian: Государственная Инспекция по безопасности дорожного движения, ГИбДД) abbreviated as GIBDD, since 2002
- GAI (Russian: ГАИ, IPA: [ɡɐˈi]), short for State Automobile Inspectorate (Russian: Государственная Автомобильная Инспекция, romanized: Gosudarstvennaya Avtomobilnaya Inspektsiya), until 2011
- DPS (Russian: ДПС), short for Road Patrol Service (Russian: Дорожно-патрульная служба, romanized: Dorozhno-patrulnaya sluzhba) - a part of the GAI/GIBDD directly responsible for patrolling the streets

== Heads of Administration ==
- Vladimir Feodorov (1992–2002)
- Viktor Kiryanov (2003–2011)
- Vladimir Shvetsov (2011)
- Viktor Nilov (2011–2017)
- Mikhail Chernikov (2017–)

== See also ==
- Police of Russia
- Militsiya
- MVD
- Highway Patrol
- Traffic Police
