= Road Traffic Control Department =

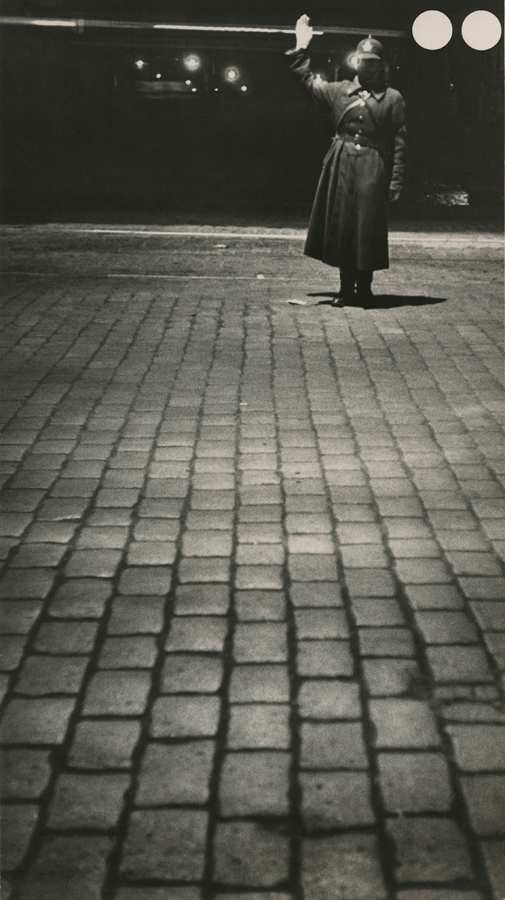
The ORUD traffic guard in Moscow, 1935.

The Road Traffic Control Department (Russian: Отдел по регулированию уличного движения, romanized: Otdel po regulirovaniju ulichnogo dvizhenija), abbreviated as ORUD (Russian: ОРУД), was the road traffic control, highway patrol and traffic law enforcement department of the Soviet Militsiya. It was in operation from 1931 to 1961, when it was merged with the State Automobile Inspectorate.

== History ==
The number of traffic accidents in the USSR greatly increased at the beginning of the 1920s. Moscow City Police recognized the need for general road traffic control, and in 1931 The Road Traffic Control Department (ORUD) was established. A special ORUD's department that handled the driver's licenses was opened as well. It also assigned license plates. A Member of Mossovet Boris Sokolov (Russian: Борис Михайлович Соколов) was appointed the head of the department. Vasily Chugunov (Russian: Василий Сергеевич Чугунов) became the Senior Inspector. There were only 145 employees at first.

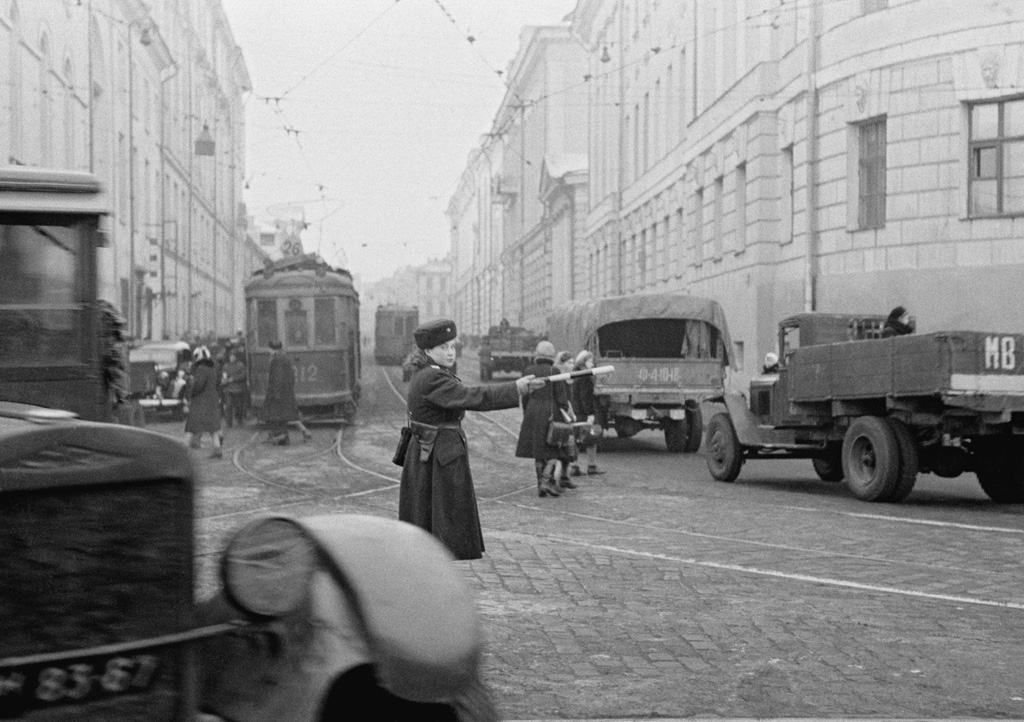
The ORUD traffic guard in Moscow, 3 November 1945.

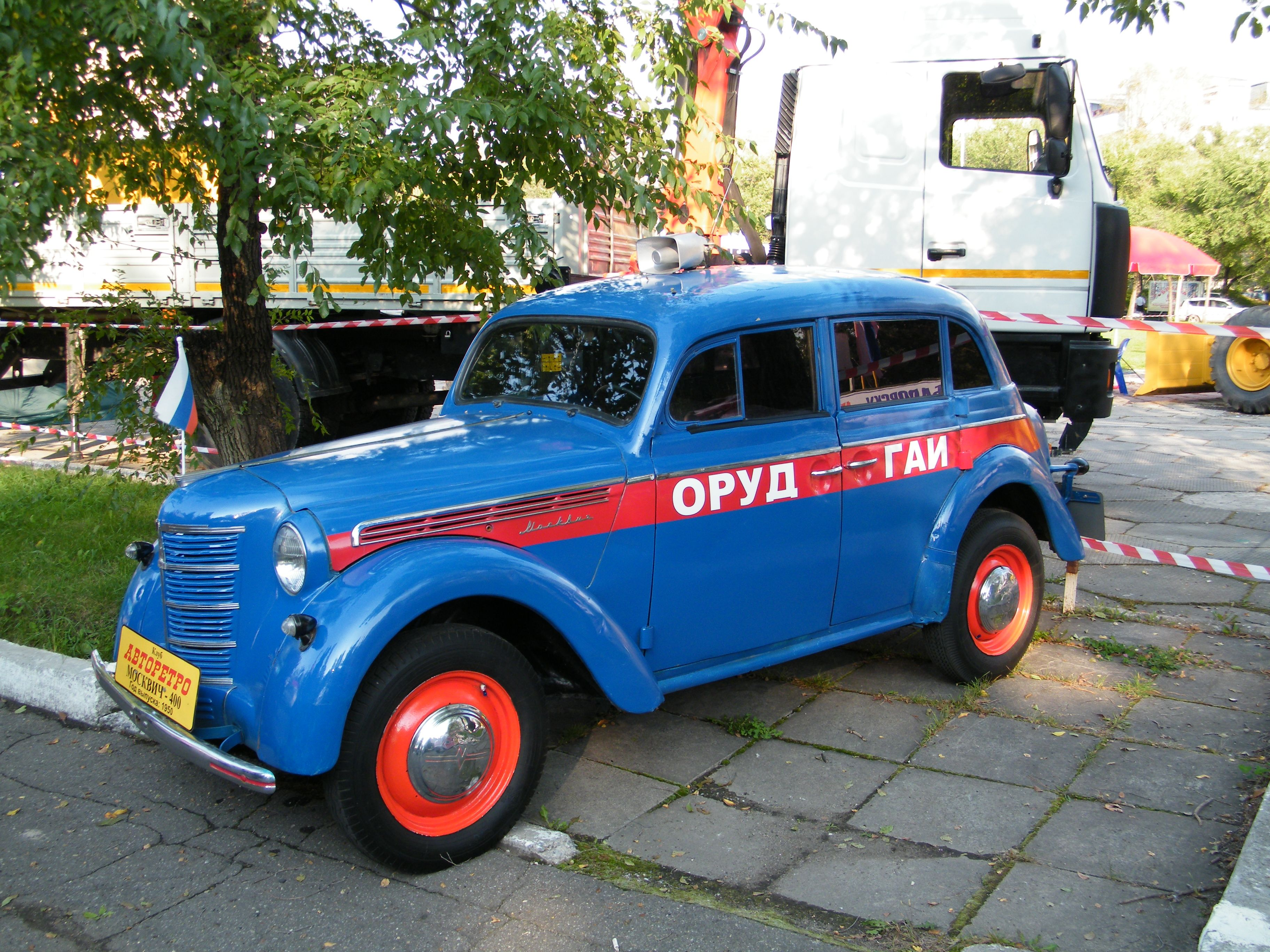
Moskvitch 400-420 painted in the ORUD colours.

By 1931 the number of ORUD employees increased to 500. On 20 March 1932 the Council of People's Commissars released a statement "About the Centralized Accounting of the Accident Rate and Local Transport Accidents". Since then, the road accident statistics was officially calculated. The same year the first traffic lights and a position of a traffic guard were introduced in Moscow. The first highway patrol was formed in March 1933 and it consisted of 50 people.

In 1936 the State Automobile Inspectorate, also known as GAI, was established. Among its responsibilities were the prevention of car theft, the recovery of stolen vehicles, calculation of transport properties, supervision over the drivers training, and calculating the overall numbers of motor vehicles. In 1961 ORUD was merged with GAI. The joint agency was called RUD-GAI (Russian: РУД–ГАИ, lit. '"Road Traffic Control–State Automobile Inspectorate"'), which was later changed to simple "GAI" and in 1998 became the Main Directorate for Road Traffic Safety of Russia.

== Uniforms ==
The Road Traffic Control Department officers on the streets, e.g. the traffic guards, had a capital "R" (Cyrillic Р) on the left sleeve. In the 1940s the colour of the uniforms was dark blue or white with dark blue trousers, depending on the officer's rank. Wearing high boots while using motorcycles was obligatory.

As of June 1957 the appearance of the badge was changed to a red-framed dark blue rhombus with a capital "R" in the centre.

== See also ==
- Department of Motor Vehicles
- Militsiya
