= Mouthwashing (video game) =

2024 video game

- Steam promotional artwork
- Developer: Wrong Organ
- Publisher: Critical Reflex
- Producer: Kai Moore
- Designers: Jeffrey Tomec; Johanna Kasurinen; Martin Halldin; Tanakorn Ratanala-orng; Dave Van Egdom
- Programmers: Jeffrey Tomec; Dave Van Egdom
- Artists: Johanna Kasurinen; Yasmine Lindberger; Martin Halldin
- Writer: Johanna Kasurinen
- Composer: Martin Halldin
- Engine: Unity
- Platforms: Microsoft Windows; Nintendo Switch; PlayStation 4; PlayStation 5; Xbox One; Xbox Series X/S
- Release: Microsoft Windows; 26 September 2024; Switch, PS4, PS5, XBO, XBX/S; 29 October 2026
- Genre: Adventure
- Mode: Single-player

Mouthwashing is a 2024 horror adventure game developed by Swedish company Wrong Organ and published by Critical Reflex. It follows the crew of the cargo spaceship Tulpar after a mysterious crash leaves them stranded in space, trapped within as supplies dwindle. The captain, alive but maimed and unable to speak or move, is blamed by the crew for deliberately crashing the ship. The game received acclaim for its narrative and visual style.

== Gameplay ==
Screenshot showing Jimmy conversing with Anya as Curly lays on the medical bed next to her; scenes set after the crash play out from Jimmy's point of view

Mouthwashing is played from a first-person perspective with little in the way of survival mechanics or combat. It can also be described as a walking simulator. Gameplay primarily involves exploring the Tulpar, engaging in dialogue with the crew, and solving puzzles using various items.

Presented as a nonlinear narrative, the game plays out across disjointed scenes taking place in the weeks and months before and after the crash. Jumps in the timeline are sometimes delineated by non-diegetic transitions that mimic glitches designed to briefly trick the player into believing their computer or console has crashed. Players experience Curly's perspective in the scenes before the crash, while scenes taking place after the crash are from the perspective of his co-pilot Jimmy, who takes on the role of captain in the aftermath of the disaster.

== Plot ==
During a routine shipment, the Pony Express freighter spaceship Tulpar crashes into an asteroid. The crew members (captain Curly, co-pilot Jimmy, medic Anya, mechanic Swansea, and intern Daisuke) survive, but most of the ship's resources are blocked off by airbag-like foam, damage to which could potentially breach the ship's hull and trigger lethal decompression. Curly, unable to speak or move after being severely mutilated by the crash, is kept sedated via a dwindling supply of painkillers. Declaring himself acting captain, Jimmy accuses Curly of going postal and causing the crash.

When food and medical supplies begin to run low after two months, the crew decide to open their confidential shipment; they discover, to their dismay and confusion, that it consists solely of mouthwash. A recovering alcoholic, Swansea impulsively breaks his sobriety and consumes the mouthwash for its 14% alcohol content, and his continual intoxication further increases tensions. Jimmy, who has been feeding Curly his pills as Anya cannot bring herself to do so, snaps under pressure and force-feeds Curly in a rage before hallucinating killing him with an axe.

Four months after the crash, Anya locks herself in the medical bay with Curly. After failing to convince a drunken Swansea to let them into the utility bay, Jimmy and Daisuke serve him a tainted mocktail using the ship's sole bottle of rubbing alcohol. With Swansea rendered unconscious, Jimmy and Daisuke discover that Swansea was guarding the ship's only working cryopod, which Jimmy believes he was saving for himself. Jimmy coerces Daisuke into crawling through a damaged vent into the medical bay. Daisuke makes it through, but is severely injured in the process. With the rubbing alcohol gone, Jimmy uses the mouthwash as an impromptu antiseptic, but it only worsens Daisuke's pain. Swansea, having grown fond of Daisuke, reluctantly performs a crude mercy killing on him with a fire axe. Jimmy goes into the medical bay and it is revealed Anya has committed suicide by overdosing on the remaining painkillers. Jimmy finds the ship's emergency revolver and hallucinates being attacked by a vengeful Swansea.

Flashbacks to the days leading up to the crash reveal that the Tulpar crew were due to be laid off following their delivery due to Pony Express going out of business. At his birthday party, Curly breaks the news prematurely and reveals that due to his service to the company, he has been recommended for a better job. Anya later tells Curly that she is pregnant, hinting that it is the result of Jimmy raping her. Curly attempts to ease tensions with Jimmy, only for Anya to reveal her pregnancy to him behind Curly's back. Curly confronts Jimmy and urges him to take responsibility for his actions. Jimmy warns him that if word gets out about what he did to Anya, Curly will be held accountable as well. This, along with his friendship with Jimmy, results in Curly letting Jimmy go. The stress of his impending layoff, his jealousy toward Curly, and the threat of being held accountable for Anya's pregnancy ultimately drive Jimmy to crash the Tulpar in a failed murder-suicide bid; it is revealed that Curly acquired his injuries while attempting to prevent the crash.

Jimmy begins to hallucinate that the ship is a maze, finding himself in a graveyard where Swansea hunts him down with a fire axe. He subdues Swansea, who confesses that the years he spent addicted to alcohol were the best of his life, and implies that the cryopod was actually intended for Daisuke. Swansea condemns Jimmy for his selfishness and cowardice, prompting Jimmy to kill him with the revolver. His sanity rapidly declining, Jimmy holds a mock birthday party with Curly and the corpses of the crew. He cuts off and eats part of Curly's leg, then force-feeds Curly his own flesh in a surreal hallucination. He hallucinates himself justifying his actions to his reanimated crew members and apologizing to Curly, who appears to be on fire.

After a series of visions in which he is chased by a deformed mass of horse statues, Jimmy finds himself confronted by the Pony Express mascot Polle, who mocks him for his inability to take accountability for his faults. After convincing himself that he can be redeemed if he ensures Curly's survival, Jimmy places Curly in the cryopod, apologizes to him for everything he has done, then kills himself with the revolver. Curly is placed into a 20-year cryosleep, his fate left uncertain.

== Development and release ==
The team behind Mouthwashing includes producer Kai Moore, audio designer Martin Halldin, art and narrative designer Johanna Kasurinen, designer and programmer Jeffrey Tomec, and technical designer Dave van Egdom. The developers took inspiration from films including Alien, Event Horizon, Sunshine, The Thing, The Shining, and Pandorum. The game utilises a low poly, retro visual style inspired by titles released for the original PlayStation. Art designer Johanna Kasurinen credits indie developer Puppet Combo for introducing her to the style, stating that "we don't need state-of-the-art graphics to make something impactful" in an interview with Rolling Stone. In an interview with The Washington Post, Kasurinen explained that the initial concept for the game was inspired by a previous project, stating "It was that state of a team of people trying to convince ourselves, 'We can still fix this if we just try harder,' when everything was already limping and on fire, that eventually planted the seed."

Mouthwashing was first announced as part of a free update (inspired by Katamari Damacy) to developer Wrong Organ's debut title, How Fish Is Made. A demo for the game released during Steam Next Fest in February 2024 to positive reception, with the full game releasing for Windows via Steam on 26 September 2024. Mouthwashing was well received by audiences on release, achieving an "Overwhelmingly Positive" rating on Steam within the first two weeks, the highest possible rating on the platform, and was nominated for Game of the Year at the 2024 Indie Game Awards.

On 19 February 2025, developer Wrong Organ and publisher Critical Reflex announced that they would be releasing Mouthwashing on Nintendo Switch, PlayStation 5 and Xbox Series X/S sometime in 2025. These ports, as well as ports for PlayStation 4 and Xbox One, released on 29 October 2026.

== Reception ==
Reception

Aggregate scores
Aggregator	Score
Metacritic	88/100
OpenCritic	92% recommend

Review scores
Publication	Score
Eurogamer	4/5
Game Informer	8.75/10
Hardcore Gamer	3/5
IGN	9/10
PC Gamer (US)	87/100
TechRadar	5/5
The Guardian	4/5
Bloody Disgusting	4/5
Paste	8.7/10
Siliconera	9/10

Mouthwashing received "generally favorable" reviews from critics, according to review aggregator platform Metacritic. Fellow review aggregator OpenCritic assessed that the game received "mighty" approval, being recommended by 92% of critics.

The game's narrative structure received praise from critics. The opening, which puts the player in control while the viewpoint character crashes the Tulpar, was praised by critics from Bloody Disgusting and Rock Paper Shotgun for creating an immediate sense of tension and prompting curiosity about what has just happened. Writing for Paste, Elijah Gonzalez felt that the game's nonlinear narrative enhanced the sense of intrigue by driving speculation on preceding events. Leon Hurley of GamesRadar+ felt that the use of a nonlinear narrative and unreliable narrator created an air of mystery and kept the player uncertain about the true nature of events. The nonlinear narrative was also praised for adding depth to the cast of characters by revealing different aspects of their personalities, and for immersing the player in the setting of the Tulpar. Lucy Buglass of TechRadar described the game as "constantly compelling", while Stephanie Liu of Siliconera called it "a master class in how you can push video game writing to its limits."

The graphics and visual style were also received well. Aaron Boehm of Bloody Disgusting labelled the low-poly graphics as "beautiful", and Elijah Gonzalez of Paste said they "invite us to imagine the finer details for ourselves". Leon Hurley of GamesRadar+ wrote that "[Mouthwashing's] low poly horror stylings hide a triple A art direction". Keith Stuart of The Guardian praised the game's visual style for its ability to generate unease in the player, comparing it to the work of the filmmakers David Lynch and Dario Argento. Writing for Hardcore Gamer, Kyle LeClair likened the graphics to fifth generation video game consoles, arguing that they complement the Tulpar's retro style. This comparison to fifth generation titles, particularly those of the original PlayStation, was echoed by Harold Goldberg of The New York Times, Ronny Barrier of IGN, Azario Lopez of Noisy Pixel, and Oisin Kuhnke of VG247. A number of outlets, including GamesRadar+, Rock Paper Shotgun, and Bloody Disgusting, called aspects of the game "cinematic", including its framing of shots and the glitchy transitions between scenes. However, Katy Hanson of Rely on Horror felt the transitions disrupted the flow of the game.

The setting was generally well received. Writing for Eurogamer, Katharine Castle praised the developers for making "wonderful use of its small and intimate setting". Ed Thorn of Rock Paper Shotgun called the Tulpar a "brilliantly realised space", citing the game's use of twisting, narrow corridors, but argued that certain scenes tended towards "surrealist tunnel meandering". In contrast, critics for Bloody Disgusting and Rely on Horror felt that the small, cramped setting at the beginning of the game set up the transition to hallucinatory shifting hallways well. Ted Litchfield of PC Gamer called the Tulpar a "fantastic setting" and noted the inclusion of "great character details" left throughout the ship such as notes, pamphlets, and half-finished board games. Not all critics agreed, however, with Kyle LeClair of Hardcore Gamer arguing that the limited number of locations made the game unpleasantly repetitive.

Critics enjoyed the cast of characters. Kyle LeClair of Hardcore Gamer felt the characters had "nice and colorful personalities", and Katy Hanson of Rely on Horror found them "charming and memorable". Writing for PC Gamer, Ted Litchfield considered the horror to be built upon human drama, featuring themes of "failed ambitions, resentments, and regrets of people forced to work a dead-end job". Critics for Paste and VG247 similarly identified satire and black comedy in the game's treatment of corporate greed, which enhanced the horror and gave depth to the characters' motivations, although Elijah Gonzalez of Paste felt that Anya was less well-developed as a character, which he thought "squares awkwardly with the fact she's constantly catching verbal abuse from her male co-workers".

Critics were more mixed on the game's puzzles and combat and stealth gameplay sections. Ed Thorn of Rock Paper Shotgun described the gameplay as "simple, but wonderfully tactile" and Ted Litchfield of PC Gamer felt that the tactile nature of the minigames and their juxtaposition of food and human flesh made for compelling body horror. However, Stephanie Liu of Siliconera called the combat and stealth sections "unnecessary and clunky". Similarly, Ronny Barrier of IGN found the survival horror and combat segments "frustrating", though brief enough so as not to hamper his enjoyment. Katy Hanson of Rely on Horror thought the puzzles were too simple, which made them "feel like busywork", and Kyle LeClair of Hardcore Gamer felt the "annoying chase bits" and "non-challenging puzzles" were not enough to justify Mouthwashing being a videogame rather than a visual novel. Aaron Boehm, writing for Bloody Disgusting, argued to the contrary, claiming that the gameplay "always complements the narrative and mood of the game in a way that justifies it being an interactive piece of media". Reviews in Bloody Disgusting and Rely on Horror praised the game's subversion of traditional video game mechanics, such as its use of onscreen objectives to build suspense, and Keith Stuart of The Guardian felt the game was "a study of what games are and what they want us to do".

=== Awards and accolades ===
Year	Ceremony	Category	Result	Ref.
2024	The Horror Game Awards	Best Narrative	Won	
2024	The Horror Game Awards	Players' Choice	Won	
2024	The Indie Game Awards	Game of the Year	Nominated	
2024	The Indie Game Awards	Narrative	Nominated	
2024	The Steam Awards	Outstanding Story-Rich Game	Nominated	
2025	New York Game Awards	Chumley's Speakeasy Award for Best Hidden Gem	Won	
2025	28th Annual D.I.C.E. Awards	Outstanding Achievement for an Independent Game	Nominated	
2025	25th Game Developers Choice Awards	Best Narrative	Nominated	
2025	Independent Games Festival	Seumas McNally Grand Prize	Honorable mention	
2025	Independent Games Festival	Excellence in Audio	Honorable mention	
2025	Independent Games Festival	Excellence in Narrative	Honorable mention	

== Film adaptation ==
In October 2026, it was announced that a feature film based on Mouthwashing is in development at Sony Pictures Releasing and Screen Gems. Karyn Kusama was later announced to be director, while Matt Manfredi and Phil Hay will write the film. Scott Derrickson and C. Robert Cargill are producing.
