= Yan Frenkel =

Soviet composer (1920–1989)

Yan Frenkel Ян Френкель

Background information
- Born: November 21, 1920; Kiev, Ukrainian SSR
- Died: August 25, 1989 (aged 68) Riga, Latvian SSR, Soviet Union
- Occupations: Composer; singer; violinist; pianist; actor
- Instruments: Violin, piano

Yan Abramovich Frenkel (Note: Russian: Ян Абрамович Френкель, romanized: Yan Abramovich Frenkel; Ukrainian: Ян Абрамович Френкель, romanized: Yan Abramovych Frenkel) (November 21, 1920 – August 25, 1989) was a Soviet composer and performer of Jewish descent. Frenkel was awarded the USSR State Prize in 1982 and received the title of People's Artist of the USSR in 1989.

== Biography ==
Yan Frenkel was a Soviet composer born in Kiev. He was originally taught violin by his father, Avraham Nathanovich Frenkel, and later studied classical violin at the Kiev Conservatory under Yakob Magaziner, and the piano. During the Second World War, he was evacuated to Chkalov (now Orenburg), where he entered at the Chkalov Anti-Aircraft School, and played the violin in the orchestra of the Avrora Cinema. In 1942, he served at the front lines and was wounded. After spending time in a hospital, he played in the military orchestra from 1943. After the war, he lived in Moscow from 1946, where he wrote orchestral arrangements and played the violin in small orchestras.

He began composing songs in the 1960s. His first was the song Gody ('The Years'), written to lyrics by Mark Lisianski. During his later career, he worked in collaboration with many prominent Soviet musicians, including Mikhail Tanich, Igor Shaferan, and the husband and wife team Konstantin Vanshenkin and Inna Goff. Thanks to Mark Bernes, his song Zhuravli ('The Cranes', lyrics by Rasul Gamzatov) became a major hit. Frenkel gave concerts in which he performed his own music. During these concerts the audience would generally join in. His songs were included in the repertoire of many Soviet performers. He also appeared in the movie The Elusive Avengers, for which he composed a score.

He performed his own songs in concerts, usually with the audience singing along with him. His works were in the repertoire of Anna German, Joseph Kobzon, Georg Ots, Mikhail Chuev, Nani Bregvadze, Mark Bernes, Emil Gorovets and Maya Kristalinskaya.

Yan Frenkel died on August 25, 1989, in Riga (as foreshadowed in his song Avgust ('August') to the lyrics of Inna Goff). He was buried at Novodevichy Cemetery. The composer played his last concert in the spring of the same year in Tomsk. His wife Natalia died in the mid-1990s, but his daughter Nina has lived in Italy since the 1980s. His grandson Ian Frenkel is a musician (pianist and arranger) in the United States Coast Guard Band.

== Trivia ==
As reported by composer's fan site, members of Soviet ruling bureaucracy orchestrated a campaign against 'The Cranes', citing the song's religious undertones. The case was elevated all the way to the Soviet leader Leonid Brezhnev, who decreed "acceptable to perform, but not too often".

Frenkel was the prototype for Gena the Crocodile, a fictional, friendly crocodile in the series of popular animation films Gena the Crocodile, Cheburashka and Shapoklyak.

== Selected filmography ==
- Adventures of the Yellow Suitcase (1970)
- The Crown of the Russian Empire, or Once Again the Elusive Avengers (1971)
- Incorrigible Liar (1973)

== Sources ==
- The original version of this page was translated from the corresponding page in the Russian language Wikipedia
- Yan Frenkel (fansite in Russian)
