= The Mystery of the Third Planet =

1981 sci-fi animated film

The Mystery of the Third Planet Тайна третьей планеты
- DVD cover (Krupnyy Plan)
- Directed by: Roman Kachanov
- Written by: Kir Bulychev (story & screenplay)
- Starring: Olga Gromova; Vsevolod Larionov; Yuri Volyntsev; Vasily Livanov; Grigory Shpigel; Vladimir Kenigson; Vladimir Druzhnikov
- Edited by: Nadezhda Treshcheva; Olga Vasilenko
- Music by: Aleksandr Zatsepin
- Distributed by: Soyuzmultfilm
- Release date: January 1, 1981 (USSR)
- Running time: 50 minutes (original version)
- Country: Soviet Union
- Language: Russian

The Mystery of the Third Planet (Russian: Тайна третьей планеты, Tayna tretyey planety, also translated as The Secret of the Third Planet) is a 1981 Soviet traditionally animated feature film directed by Roman Kachanov and produced by the Soyuzmultfilm studio in Moscow. It is based on a 1964 novella Alisa's Travel by Kir Bulychev, part of the Alisa Seleznyova children's science fiction book series.

The movie is considered a cult classic in Russia and was included in various lists of the best animated films and science fiction films. A shortened novelization of The Mystery of the Third Planet was written by Bulychev himself, with other adaptations including a diafilm and a number of video games. The 2009 feature film Alice's Birthday is considered a spiritual successor of the work.

== Plot ==
Captain Zelyony, Professor Seleznyov and his daughter Alisa Seleznyova set out from Earth aboard the Pegas (Pegasus) starship, seeking out new animal species for the Moscow Zoo. Visiting the Moon as a resting point, Seleznyov meets his friend, Gromozeka the alien archaeologist, who advises him to turn to the Planet of Two Captains, a huge museum dedicated to Captains Kim and Buran who went around the whole universe on their ship, the Blue Seagull, for useful information on where the rare animals live. Doctor Verkhovtsev, the director of the museum, is seen visiting the moon as well; however, he avoids Gromozeka.

On the Planet of two Captains, the heroes meet Verkhovtsev and ask him to show them the Captain's diaries for directions to find rare animals. But the doctor behaves suspiciously: he refuses to show them the diaries and starts spying on the expedition.

Visiting the planet Bluk, the heroes make some valuable purchases, and found out about Chatterbirds — a special kind of birds who could imitate human speech and fly in open space. The heroes found out that they went extinct, and the one responsible for their extinction was none other than Doctor Verkhovtsev. Later, Alisa and Seleznyov spot the Doctor himself on the planet, but an unknown fat alien encounters them and dismisses their claims. A secretive local person, having heard about the heroes' intentions to find a Chatterbird, tells them that he once saved an injured Chatterbird and refused to give it away to the man suspiciously similar to the Doctor. Since he's too afraid to keep the Chatterbird for now, he gives it to the heroes for free. On the way back to the ship, the heroes are ambushed, but manage to defeat their opponents. The fat alien, named Funnyguy Oo, appears as well; he gifts a diamond-shelled tortoise to the heroes and attempts to get the Chatterbird, but to no avail.

Soon the bird in question starts talking, and it is found out that it belongs to the captain Kim, who apparently went missing. Having listened to the speech of the Chatterbird, the Pegas crew heads for the Medusa system. On the road, the heroes get a SOS signal from the planet Shelezyaka, a planet that is populated only by robots, who recently started malfunctioning. It is then revealed that the robots once helped the Chatterbird as well, and also that the Doctor visited the planet as well and found out about this. All the malfunctioning happened shortly after the Doctor left off: as a revenge, he put diamond dust into the grease that the robots used.

Exploring the three-planet Medusa system, the heroes pass the inhospitable first planet and find mirage-projecting stones at the second planet, who depict the Blue Seagull — a spaceship of Captains Kim and Buran. On the third planet, however, the heroes experience some adventures with the local flora and fauna, and get some clues that the Blue Seagull can be somewhere there. Later, Alisa finds strange mirror-like flowers. After the heroes transport them to the Pegas, they found out that the flowers had been recording everything that was happening in front of them, and upon being picked up, they started deteriorating and depicting what they recorded in reverse. Watching the flowers, the heroes find out that both Verkhovtsev and Funnyguy Oo were on the planet, and they were cooperating as space pirates. Pretty soon, the tortoise destroys the flowers, and Zelyony finds out that the tortoise actually was a spying device that helped the pirates to track down the heroes. In attempt to fly in a safe place, Pegas falls in a trap. Seleznyov and Zelyony are captured by Verkhovtsev and Funnyguy Oo, while Alisa manages to escape. She then finds out that Captain Buran also landed on the planet — together with Doctor Verkhovtsev, but, apparently, not the same one who trapped her comrades.

The Blue Seagull appears to have been caught in the same trap that Pegas landed in. It is then revealed that Captain Kim was trapped in his spaceship by pirates, who wanted to get his formula of absolute fuel. However, after the pirates took heroes as hostages and threaten to murder them, Kim, not having the strength to hold in anymore, exits the ship, encounters and disarms the pirates on his own. Pretty soon, Buran and the other Doctor Verkhovtsev arrive and help him, and the pirates get clearly outmatched. With two Verkhovtsevs being at the same place now, one of them exposes the other one as Glot the space pirate (who immediately attempts suicide, but is exposed by Funnyguy Oo just to be feigning death), reveals that Glot posing as him was the one responsible for all the crimes, and confesses that Glot and Funnyguy Oo's previous interest in the Captains' diaries made him suspect the heroes back at the museum. Buran also points out that the Chatterbird's previous owner, knowing the bird's lines about the Medusa system, was the one who directed him and the real Verkhovtsev there.

After everything is settled down, the heroes make Funnyguy Oo open the trap and capture him and Glot. With the commotion around Gromozeka suddenly appearing late to the call to save the day, Funnyguy escapes, but is captured by a local bird of prey and carried away to the nest. In the end, the captains and the Doctor take away from the planet, and the main protagonists are returning to Earth with captured Glot and with the animals they collected.

== Cast ==
Character	Original	English
Alisa	Olga Gromova	Unknown
Professor Seleznyov	Vsevolod Larionov	Unknown
Chatterbird	Vsevolod Larionov	Unknown
Cpt. Zelyony	Yuri Volyntsev	Unknown
Gromozeka	Vasily Livanov	Unknown
Funnyguy Oo	Grigory Shpigel	Unknown
Old lady with a cake	Rina Zelyonaya	Unknown
Navigator Basov	Yuri Andreyev	Unknown
Prof. Verkhovtsev	Pyotr Vishnyakov	Unknown
Glot	Pyotr Vishnyakov	Unknown
Cpt. Kim	Vladimir Druzhnikov	Unknown
Cpt. Buran	Nikolai Grabbe	Unknown
Robot waiter	Vladimir Kenigson	Unknown
Robot from planet Shelezyaka	Vladimir Kenigson	Unknown
Shop keeper snail	Yelena Krasnobayeva	Unknown
Ushan on the street	Roman Kachanov Jr	Unknown

== Creators ==
	English
Director	Roman Kachanov
Writer	Kir Bulychev (story & screenplay)
Art Director	Natalya Orlova (Note: The actress Yekaterina Semyonova, daughter of Orlova, has said that the design of Alice was based on her and that her father served as the prototype of Captain Green.)
Artists	Alla Goreva; Dmitry Kulikov; Igor Oleynikov; I. Litovskaya; Irina Svetlitsa; Viktor Chuguyevsky; V. Maksimovich; Geliy Arkadyev; Gennady Morozov
Animators	Marina Voskanyants; Marina Rogova; Vladimir Arbekov; Vladimir Zarubin; Aleksandr Panov; Violetta Kolesnikova; Renata Mirenkova; Vladimir Shevchenko; Antonina Alyoshina; Olga Orlova; Iosif Kuroyan; Yuri Batanin
Camera	Svetlana Koshcheyeva; Teodor Bunimovich
Music	Aleksandr Zatsepin
Editors	Nadezhda Treshcheva; Olga Vasilenko
Sound	Boris Filchikov
Script Editor	Natalya Abramova
Executive Producer	Ninel Lipnitskaya

== International broadcast ==
Country	Company	Air Date in cinema	Title	Dubbing
Finland	YLE; Nelonen	6 November 1982	Kolmannen planeetan arvoitus	Finnish
United States	Touchstone Pictures	23 May 1987 (first version); 4 December 1998 (second version)	Alice and the mystery of the third planet (American version)	English The 2nd version was part of Mikhail Baryshnikov's "Tales from my Childhood" series. The voiceover actors includes James Belushi, Kirsten Dunst, and Harvey Fierstein.
Estonia	Tallinnfilm; Kanal 2	3 July 1987 (cinema); 5 March 2007 (Festival)	Kolmanda planeedi saladus	Estonian
Sweden	TV3		Mysteriet med två kaptener	Swedish
Spain	Canal Nou Telecinco; Clan TVE	31 July 1994 1998 (Films by Jove version); 2016 (dubbing version)	El misteri del tercer planeta El misterio del tercer planeta	Catalan (Valencian) Spanish
Lithuania	TV3 Lithuania		Trečiojo planetos paslaptis	Lithuanian (voice-over)
Italy; San Marino	Rai 3		Alice e il mistero del terzo pianeta	Italian
Latvia	TV3 Latvia		Alice: Sāciet piedzīvojumu	Latvian (voice-over)
Bulgaria			Мистерията на третата планета	Bulgarian (dubbing version with subtitles)
Poland	Polsat	4 July 2001	Tajemnica Trzeciej Planety	Polish
China	CCTV-6, CCTV-14		第三顆行星的奧秘	Chinese (Mandarin)
France	France 5, Canal J, WE Productions, M6 Vidéo	1982 (first version); 1995 (second version)	Le Mystère de la Troisième Planète	French
Czech Republic; Slovakia	Barrandov (dubbing production); Markíza	2016	Tajemství třetí planety Tajomstvo tretej planéty	Czech; Slovak
Australia	Nine Network	2016	The Mystery of The Third Planet	English
Netherlands	NCRV	17 November 2004	Mysterie van de Derde Planeet	Subtitled
Belgium	RTBF	2016	Le Mystère de la Troisième Planète	French
South Korea	KBS	1 August 2005	3 번째 행성의 신비	Korean
Hungary	RTL Klub, A+	31 October 2005	Misztériumát a harmadik bolygó	Hungarian
Romania	TVR2	1 January 2006	Misterul din a treia planetă	Romanian
Germany; Austria	DEFA, RTL II (Germany); ORF (Austria)		Das Geheimnis des Dritten Planeten	German
Ukraine	K1	2017	Таємниця третьої планети	Ukrainian (voice-over)
India	Kushi TV (Telugu); Disney Channel (Tamil, Hindi); Kochu TV (Malayalam); Chintu TV (Kannada); Sony Yay (English, Hindi); Star Jalsha (Bengali)		तीसरे ग्रह का रहस्य; The Mystery of the Third Planet	Hindi; Tamil; Telugu; English; Malayalam; Kannada; Bengali
Indonesia	Indosiar	1 January 2008	Gadis dari Bumi	Indonesian
Israel	Arutz HaYeladim	8 July 2008	המסתורין של כוכב לכת השלישי	Hebrew; Original (only Russian-speaking Jews in Israel)
North Macedonia; Croatia; Serbia; Slovenia	MKRTV; HRT; Happy TV; POP TV	25 May 2008	Тајната на Сончевиот систем Медуза; Misterija trećeg planeta Tajna treće planete Skrivnost tretjega Planeta	Macedonian; Croatian; Serbian; Slovenian
Turkey	Kanal D, Show TV		Üçüncü Gezegen Gizem	Turkish
Portugal	RTP	2016	Mistério do Terceiro Planeta	Portuguese
Japan	Nippon Animation (first version); Toei Animation (second version)	1985 (video premiere); 2016	第三惑星の秘密	Japanese
Middle East	MBC 3, Spacetoon	20 May 2010 (except Oman, Yemen, Saudi Arabia and Syria)	سر الكوكب الثالث	Arabic
Brazil	SBT		O Mistério do Planeta Terceiro	Portuguese (Brazilian)
Latin America	Televisa (MEX); Empresa Hispanoamericana de Video, Telefe (Argentina); Canal 13 (Chile); Caracol Television (Colombia); Frecuencia Latina (Peru); Venevisión (Venezuela); TV Total (Uruguay)	4 November 1997 (Argentina, Films by Jove); 2016 (Latin America)	El misterio del tercer planeta	Spanish

== Home video and English adaptations ==
The film was adapted twice for the American market. It was first brought over as a video release in 1987, with dubbed voices. The second time, it was released in the 1990s as part of Mikhail Baryshnikov's Stories from My Childhood series. This series consisted of films that were bought by California-based company Films by Jove from Soyuzmultfilm for the international market. Over $1.5 million was spent by this company restoring the prints, adding new music and redubbing the films with American actors. This version of the film was named Alice and the Mystery of the Third Planet and has been released on VHS as well as on a 1999 DVD collection with several other films . The film has been released on DVD several times (the latest release, which featured rather misleading cover art, was in October 2005 ). The original Russian version with English subtitles is here:

The Films by Jove version of the film has been criticized by some of those who saw the original for adding many extra dialogue lines, shortening the film, and replacing the unique synthesizer music by Aleksandr Zatsepin.

The original film has been released on several DVD editions in Russia, including a newly restored one by Krupnyy Plan.

Deaf Crocodile released the film on Blu-ray for the first time as part of Treasures of Soviet Animation Volume One, packaged with Vladimir Tarasov's The Return and The Pass.

== Awards ==
- 1982 — USSR State Prize

== Games ==
- In 2005 an arcade platform game was made by the company Akella based on the film, called "Alice's Space Adventure".
- An adventure game was released in the same year called "Alice's Journey", also produced by Akella (but developed by "Step Creative Group").

== Production ==
This was the fourth film using traditional drawn animation directed by Roman Kachanov, who served as the art director and/or animator on over 30 animated movies. Kachanov's best-known works, (The Mitten, Gena the Crocodile, Cheburashka, Shapoklyak and others) were shot in stop motion (volume) animation.

The characters were designed by Natalya Orlova. Her daughter, the actress Ekaterina Semyonova, said that Alice was based on her, and her father, (the director Tengiz Semyonov), was the prototype for Captain Zelyony.

Music for the movie was written by Aleksandr Zatsepin. According to Zatsepin, original records of music in his record library didn't remain, but in 2022, an official recreated version of soundtrack was released in various formats.

The production of the film took four years.

The animated film was twice released in the USA. The first dubbing, ("Mystery of the Third Planet"), came out on video in 1987. Alice's name was changed to Christine, and overall the translation had little in common with the original. Consequently, this legally-sourced version is often mistaken for a bootlegged edition.

The second version, ("Alice and the Mystery of the Third Planet"), was released in the 1990s by the Films by Jove company. In this version, the translation is much closer to the original, though a large amount of dialogue which was not in the original was also added. In this version, the soundtrack was replaced and about 6 minutes were cut out. Kirsten Dunst was the voice of Alice, and Jim Belushi — the Chatterer.

"Alice and the Mystery of the Third Planet" was released in English, Spanish, French, Finnish and other languages.

== Reception ==
Retrospective reviews are positive. Kevin Lyons called it "Gloriously strange, it’s a richly animated tale full of offbeat details with characters who all have their own distinctive little quirks and idiosyncrasies”. Kali Wallace described the backgrounds as "particularly wonderful and whimsical" describing the film as a cult classic. While Kim Tibbs review at Click Clack concluded "If you’re looking for an animated movie that is as vibrant and imaginative as it is obscure, you can’t go wrong with The Mystery of the Third Planet.

== See also ==
- Guest from the Future
- History of Russian animation
- List of animated feature films of 1981
- Alisa's Birthday, a 2009 spiritual successor animated film based on another one of the Alice stories
