= Sergey Paramonov (singer) =

Soviet vocalist (1961–1998)

- Сергей Парамонов
- Sergey Paramonov, 1972; A shot from the documentary "Seryozha Paramonov. The Soviet Robertino Loretti".
- Born: 25 June 1961; Moscow, USSR
- Died: 15 May 1998 (aged 36); Moscow, Russia
- Resting place: Krasnogorsk Cemetery
- Occupation: singer

Sergey Vladimirovich Paramonov (Russian: Сергей Владимирович Парамонов; 25 June 1961 – 15 May 1998) was a Soviet and Russian singer who gained fame as a child for his boy soprano voice. He particularly popularized songs by composer Vladimir Shainsky from the Cheburashka animated film series on television and records.

== Biography ==
Sergey Paramonov was born in Moscow and grew up as the only child of a metalworker and a university lecturer. He showed musical talent already in kindergarten, and in 1971 his grandmother enrolled him in the Big Children's Choir, where he was selected for solo performances a year later. He reached a peak in 1972 at the popular year-end concert Song of the Year (Pesnya 1972) in Moscow's Column Hall of the House of Unions, performing the song of Crocodile Gena from the animated film Cheburashka. Due to the audience's enthusiasm, the performance was spontaneously repeated.

Paramonov remained with the choir until May 1975, shortly before his voice broke at nearly 14 years old. He also sang in the soundtracks of several feature films and television movies.

Around 20 of his performances have been preserved. In the Soviet Union, he was compared to the Italian child singer Robertino Loreti. As an adult, he performed again as a singer with various musical groups. However, the exceptional brilliance of his voice was lost after the voice change, and he could not match his earlier successes.

He was married twice and had a son, Alexander (born 1996), from his second marriage. At the age of 32, he contracted tuberculosis and was declared disabled. In 1998, about a month before his 37th birthday, he died of heart failure and was found alone in his bathroom.
