= Cheburashka Goes to School =

Cheburashka Goes to School Чебурашка идёт в школу
- Directed by: Roman Kachanov
- Written by: Eduard Uspensky; Roman Kachanov
- Starring: See below
- Cinematography: Teodor Bunimovich; Vladimir Sidorov
- Edited by: Galina Filatova
- Music by: Vladimir Shainsky
- Release date: June 6, 1983
- Running time: 9 min 54 sec
- Country: Soviet Union
- Language: Russian

Cheburashka Goes to School (Russian: Чебурашка идёт в школу, Cheburashka Idyot v Shkolu) is a 1983 Soviet animated film directed by Roman Kachanov, the last one of the series about Cheburashka.

== Plot ==
On August 31, Gena the Crocodile returns home by plane, but to his surprise, Cheburashka does not meet him at the airport as expected. Gena makes his way home alone, where along the way, the mischievous Old Lady Shapoklyak plays a prank on him by putting an “Out of Order” sign on both the elevator and his apartment door. The misunderstanding unfolds as it turns out that Cheburashka received Gena's arrival telegram but couldn't read it since he never learned to read. Noticing the date on a wall calendar, Gena happily points out to Cheburashka that tomorrow is September 1st, the first day of school, which is traditionally celebrated as the Day of Knowledge in Russia. Seizing the opportunity, Gena suggests that Cheburashka should start school, and an excited Cheburashka eagerly agrees.

The friends then go shopping for school clothes, but they struggle to find any that fit Cheburashka's small size—or even Gena’s, for that matter. Meanwhile, Shapoklyak decides she too wants to start anew and, after intimidating the shop clerk with her pet rat, Lariska, she quickly buys her own school uniform. However, they find the school closed for repairs that seem never-ending. Shapoklyak steps in, offering her help, and sends Lariska to scare two workers who are lazily playing dominoes instead of fixing the school. After scolding them, she manages to get them back to work. Learning of a shortage of teachers, Gena volunteers to teach natural science, while Shapoklyak offers to become the shop class instructor.

== Creators ==
- Director: Roman Kachanov
- Screenwriters: Roman Kachanov, Eduard Uspensky
- Art directors: Leonid Shvartsman, Olga Bogolyubova
- Animators: Irina Sobinova-Kassil, Mikhail Pisman, Natalya Timofeeva, Natalia Dabizha
- Operator: Theodor Bunimovich, Vladimir Sidorov
- Director: Grigori Chmara
- Composer: Vladimir Shainsky
- Sound producer: Boris Filchikov
- Editor: Natalya Abramova
- Dolls and scenery: Pavel Gusev, Sergey Galkin, Natalia Barkovskaya, Marina Chesnokova, Alexander Belyaev, Semyon Etlis, Mikhail Koltunov, Valentin Ladygin, Vladimir Maslov, Oleg Masainov, Lyudmila Ruban, Natalia Greenberg, Svetlana Znamenskaya, Victor Grishin, Vladimir Abbakumov, Nina Moleva, Valery Petrov, Alexander Maximov
- Film editor: G. Filatova

== Cast ==
- Vasily Livanov as Gena the Crocodile
- Klara Rumyanova as Cheburashka
- Yuri Andreyev as Shapoklyak
- Georgi Burkov as Salesman

== Reception ==
"After the popular slapstick series Just You Wait!, the series became the most famous Soviet animated series despite the release of only four episodes over a span of fourteen years: Crocodile Gena (1969); Cheburashka (1971); Shapoklyak (1974); and Cheburashka Goes to School (1983)."

The film was noted for the concern with literacy expressed through the characters.
