= Monument to the sailors and fishermen perished in the sea =

Monument to the sailors and fishermen perished in the sea Piemineklis bojā gājušajiem jūrniekiem un zvejniekiem
- Liepaja Street Board; Liepājas Ceļu pārvalde
- For Sailors and fishermen perished in the sea
- Unveiled: 1977
- Location: 56.509265°N 20.991182°E in Liepāja, Latvia
- Designed by: Alberts Terpilovskis and Gunārs Asaris
- Dzied vējiņi, klusi, klusi, Nenes viļņus maliņā; Guļ jūriņas dzelmītē Mani mīļi bālēliņi РЫБАКАМ И МОРЯКАМ ΠΟГИБШИМ В МОРЕ Sing, sweet zephyr, gently, gently, Carry not the waves ashore; In the sea's tender depths slumber My dear, beloved, brothers TO THE FISHERMEN AND SAILORS LOST AT SEA

Monument to the sailors and fishermen lost at sea (Latvian: Piemineklis bojā gājušajiem jūrniekiem un zvejniekiem) is a notable modern monument and a sightseeing place in Liepāja, Latvia.

The monument was designed by architect Gunārs Asaris and sculptor Alberts Terpilovskis. It was built in 1977 with a funding from LBORF and the fishing kolhoz Boļševiks. The monument is located on the shore of the Baltic Sea in Liepāja seaside park, at the end of Kūrmājas Prospect. Here in the beginning of the 20th century was located Kurhaus. The monument consists of a bronze figure of a woman on 11 meter high V-shaped pedestal, covered by Saaremaa dolomite.

On 8 April 2000 a memorial plate dedicated to American pilots whose aircraft was brought down on 8 April 1950 by the USSR Air Forces near Liepāja was added to the pedestal of the monument.

== The Monument in pop culture ==
This monument in Liepāja often is called "Crocodile" (Latvian: Krokodils, Russian: Крокодил), because of a resemblance to Crocodile Gena from the Soviet cartoon. The inner part of the pedestal is a popular place for taking photographs.

== Gallery ==
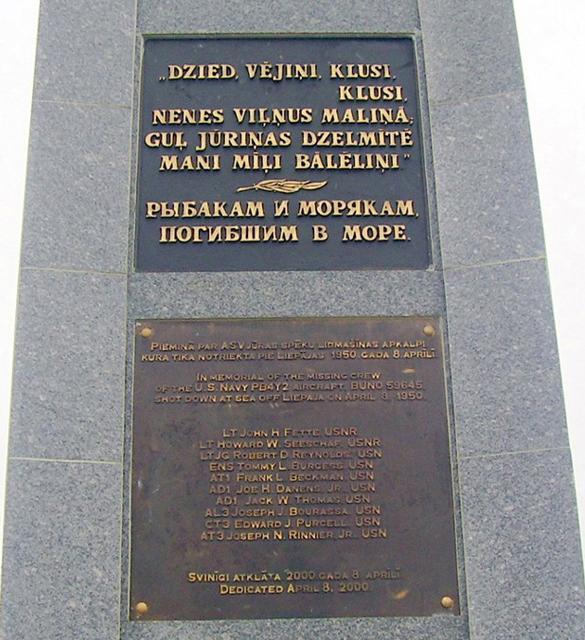
Memorial Plaque (2000)

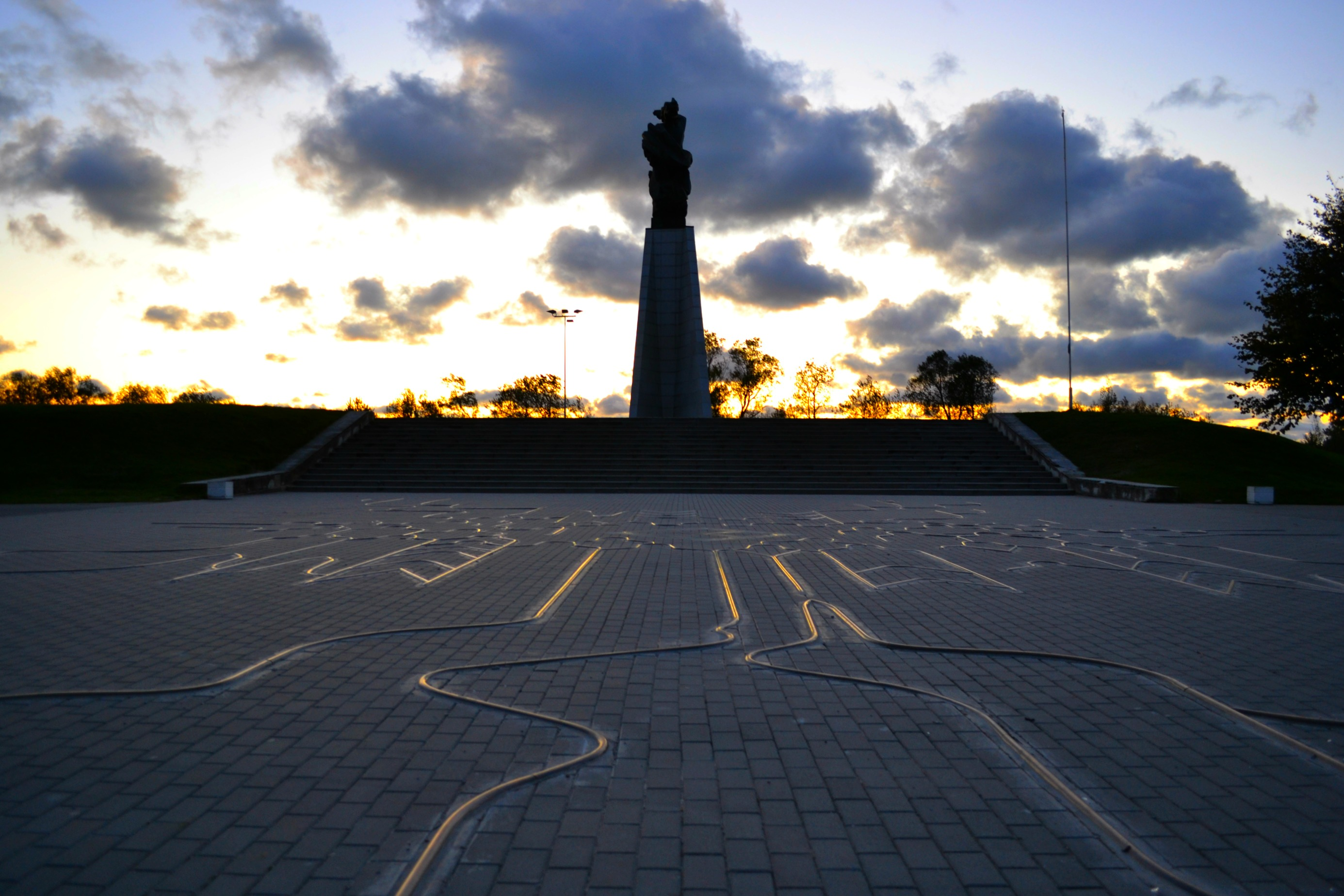
View from park looking towards the monument and sea
