= Cheburashka (disambiguation) =

Cheburashka is a fictional toy character created by Soviet writer Eduard Uspensky.

Cheburashka may also refer to:

- Cheburashka (1971 film)
- Cheburashka (2023 film)
- An-72/An-74, aircraft nicknamed after this character
