= Yuri Volyntsev =

- Born: Yuri Vitalyevich Volyntsev; 28 April 1932; Leningrad, RSFSR, USSR
- Died: 9 August 1999 (aged 67); Moscow, Russia
- Occupation: Actor
- Years active: 1962–1999
- Awards: People's Artist of the RSFSR; State Prize of the Russian Federation; Order of Honour

Yuri Vitalyevich Volyntsev (Russian: Юрий Витальевич Волынцев; 28 April 1932 – 9 August 1999) was a Soviet and Russian stage and film actor. People's Artist of the RSFSR (1984).

== Biography and career ==
Yuri Volyntsev was born on 28 April 1932 in Leningrad. He studied at the Boris Shchukin Theatre Institute (acting course of Joseph Rapoport), at the end of school in 1962, he was accepted into the troupe of the Vakhtangov-Theatre.

He voiced set of cartoon characters. To Soviet viewers he is best known for playing the role of the Pan Athlete in the humorous TV series Pub "13 Chairs".

Father of actress, radio and TV presenter Ksenia Strizh.

He died on 9 August 1999. He was buried at the Khovanskoye Cemetery.

== Filmography ==
- A Span of Earth (Пядь земли, 1964) as Cpt. Yatsenko
- Time, Forward! (Время, вперёд!, 1965) as Writer
- Anna Karenina (Анна Каренина, 1967) as Vronsky's brother-soldier
- Major Whirlwind (Майор Вихрь, 1967) as Shvalb
- The Secret Agent's Blunder (Ошибка резидента, 1968) as Sliva, taxi driver
- Belorussian Station (Белорусский вокзал, 1970) as police sergeant
- The Flight of Mr. McKinley (Бегство мистера Мак-Кинли, 1975) as McKinley's colleague
- Circus in the Circus (Соло для слона с оркестром, 1976) as Aleksandr Borisovich
- Funny People (Смешные люди!, 1977) as Aleksei Ivanovich Romansov
- Night Accident (Ночное происшествие, 1980) as Semyon Afanasyevich Astakhov, taxi driver
- Dead Souls (Мёртвые души, 1984) as Alexei Ivanovich, Chief of Police
- The Kreutzer Sonata (Крейцерова соната, 1987) as gentleman in public places
- Weather Is Good on Deribasovskaya, It Rains Again on Brighton Beach (На Дерибасовской хорошая погода, или На Брайтон-Бич опять идут дожди, 1992) as Styopa, KGB general
- Trifles of Life (Мелочи жизни, 1992–97) as Viktor Vasilyevich, special services worker

== Cartoons ==
- Dog in Boots (1981) as Fatty
- The Mystery of the Third Planet (1981) as Cpt. Zelyony
- Alice Through the Looking Glass (1982) as Humpty Dumpty
- Two Tickets to India (1985) as tamer
- Dereza (1985) as rabbit Trusha (uncredited)
- Welcome (1986) as Elk
- The Adventures of Lolo the Penguin (1987) as captain of the poachers' ship
- Laughter and Grief by the White Sea (1987) as Ivan / old listener
- DuckTales (1987–90) as Launchpad McQuack / Duckworth
- TaleSpin (1990–91) as Don Karnage
- Glasha and Kikimora (1992) as Leshy
- Darkwing Duck (1991–92) as Launchpad McQuack

== Awards ==
- Honored Artist of the RSFSR (1971)
- People's Artist of the RSFSR (1984)
- State Prize of the Russian Federation (1994)
- Order of Honour (1996)
