= Lilian Moore =

Author of children's books, teacher and poet

- Born: March 17, 1909; New York, New York
- Died: July 20, 2004 (aged 95); Seattle, Washington
- Other name: Sara Asheron
- Education: Bachelors of the Arts, Hunter College 1930
- Known for: Children's author, Poet, Children's literacy advocate, Accessibility of literature
- Notable work: Little Racoon series

Lilian Moore (pen name, Sara Asheron; March 17, 1909–July 20, 2004), was a writer of children's books, teacher and poet. She founded and edited for Scholastic's Arrow Book Club, a low-cost mail-order paperback service for children. She also helped found the Council on Interracial Books for Children.

== Early life ==
Lilian Levenson was born in The Bronx, New York City on 17 March 1909. She was educated at Hunter College where she graduated with a bachelor in Arts in 1930. She had majored in English and had planned to teach Elizabethan literature at the college level. She then continued with some graduate work at Columbia University. The Great Depression affected these goals, resulting in her finding work as a reading teacher.

== Career ==
While she had initially wanted to teach college-level literature, the Great Depression led to a lack of available jobs. Moore became an elementary school teacher in New York, NY from 1930 to 1937. There, she worked with illiterate children which may have encouraged her to work with the Bureau of Educational Research from 1937 to 1950. Sometime between 1930 and 1937, she also edited for the Unemployed Teacher publication, of the Unemployed Teachers Council. There she trained other teachers to deal with students' reading difficulties. During that time, Moore began working on children's readers. In 1946, she published her first book, A Child's First Picture Dictionary. She began work as a freelance editorial consultant for children's books in 1950. After publishing Old Rosie, the Horse Nobody Understood in 1952, her published books became more frequent. She also began work as a reading specialist in 1952. She went to work as an editor for Scholastic Corporation from 1957 until 1967. In 1957, she suggested that Scholastic make its books more accessible to children by offering low-cost mail-order paperbacks. This was a rather novel concept at the time. This led to her founding and becoming the first editor for Scholastic's Arrow Book Club in 1957. The Arrow Book Club targeted students in fourth through sixth grade. She served as an editor from 1957 until 1967. In 1960, she also became an editor for Grosset & Dunlap publishing in the How and Why Wonder Books division editing easy readers.

In 1963, she found massive success with her "Little Raccoon" series, which was first published by Whittlesey House. The series was translated into Russian and sold over 375,000 copies. A 1974 Soviet animated adaptation of the first book, Little Raccoon became a classic in 1965, where, instead of taking place in a forest, it was taking place in the jungle and the little raccoon in the film was voiced by a Russian actress Klara Rumyanova who is the voice actor of cheburashka. finding a dearth of print materials that Black youth could identify with, she sought to bring together editors, writers and librarians in what became the Council on Interracial Books for Children (or CIBC). Her first poetry book came out in 1967. Moore also wrote under the name "Sara Asheron". From 1968 to 1969 she edited history and biography series. She was also a series editor for Thomas Y. Crowell, New York, New York. She later became the director of Brooklyn Community Counseling Center.

Moore died in Seattle, Washington on July 20, 2004.

== Awards ==
In 1960, Moore won The New York Times Best Books of the Year selection. In 1985, she won the National Council of Teachers of English Award for excellence in poetry for children. Moore also was awarded the Child Study Association Children's Books of the Year five times.

Year	Award	Details
1960	New York Times Best Books of the Year	Old Rosie, the Horse Nobody Understood
1968	Child Study Association Children's Books of the Year	Just Right
1969	Child Study Association Children's Books of the Year	Junk Day on Juniper Street and Other Easy-to-Read Stories
1973	Child Study Association Children's Books of the Year	Sam's Place
1974	Child Study Association Children's Books of the Year	To See the World Afresh
1974	American Library Society Notable Book citations	To See the World Afresh
1975	Child Study Association Children's Books of the Year	See My Lovely Poison Ivy and Other Verses about Witches, Ghosts, and Things
1980	American Library Society Notable Children's Book	Think of Shadows
1982	American Library Society Notable Book citations	Something New Begins
1985	National Council of Teachers of English Award	For excellence in poetry for children

== Bibliography ==
=== General:* ===
Source: *"Little Racoon" Series listed separately

- A Child's First Picture Dictionary (1946)
- Old Rosie, the Horse Nobody Understood, illustrated by Leonard Shortall (1952)
- The Terrible Mr. Twitmeyer, illustrated by Leonard Shortall (1952)
- The Important Pockets of Paul, illustrated by William D. Haynes (1954)
- Daniel Boone, illustrated by William Moyers (1956)
- Wobbly Wheels, illustrated by B. Krush (1956)
- Bear Trouble, illustrated by Kurt Werth (1960)
- I Feel the Same Way, illustrated by Robert Quackenbush (1967) – Poetry
- Sam's Place: Poems from the Country, illustrated by Talivaldis Stubis (1973)
- Something New Begins, illustrated by Mary Jane Dunton (1982)
- I Never Did that Before (1995) – Poetry
- Mural on Second Avenue, and Other City Poems, illustrated by Roma Karas (2004)
- The Snake That Went to School, illustrated by Mary Stevens 1957)
- My Big Golden Counting Book (1957)
- Once upon a Holiday, illustrated by Wesley Dennis (1959)
- Tony the Pony, illustrated by Wesley Dennis (1959)
- Everything Happens to Stuey, illustrated by Mary Stevens (1960)
- Too Many Bozos, illustrated by Susan Perl (1960)
- A Pickle for a Nickel, illustrated by Susan Perl (1961)
- Once upon a Season, illustrated by Gloria Fiammenghi (1962)
- (With Leone Adelson) Mr. Twitmeyer and the Poodle, illustrated by Leonard Shortall (1963)
- Papa Albert, illustrated by Gloria Fiammenghi (1964)
- The Magic Spectacles, and Other Easy-to-Read Stories, illustrated by Arnold Lobel (1966)
- Just Right, illustrated by Aldern A. Watson (1968)
- I Thought I Heard the City (poems), illustrated by Mary Jane Dunton (1969)
- Junk Day on Juniper Street, and Other Easy-to-Read Stories, illustrated by Arnold Lobel (1969)
- The Riddle Walk, illustrated by John Pucci, Garrard (1971)
- (Retelling) Hans Christian Andersen, The Ugly Duckling, illustrated by Mona Barrett, 1972,
  - expanded as The Ugly Duckling and Two Other Stories, illustrated by Trina Schart Hyman, (1973)
- (Compilation, with Lawrence Webster) Catch Your Breath: A Book of Shivery Poems, illustrated by Gahan Wilson (1973)
- Spooky Rhymes and Riddles, illustrated by Ib Ohlsson (1973)
- (Compiler, with Judith Thurman) To See the World Afresh (poems) (1974)
- (With Remy Charlip) Hooray for Me!, illustrated by Vera B. Williams (1975)
- See My Lovely Poison Ivy, and Other Verses about Witches, Ghosts, and Things, illustrated by Diane Dawson (1975)
- (Compiler) Go with the Poem (1979)
- Think of Shadows (poems), illustrated by Deborah Robinson (1980)
- I'll Meet You at the Cucumbers (also see below), illustrated by Sharon Wooding (1988)
- Don't Be Afraid, Amanda (sequel to I'll Meet You at the Cucumbers), illustrated by Kathleen Garry McCord (1992)
- (Selector) Sunflakes: Poems for Children, illustrated by Jan Ormerod (1992)
- Adam Mouse's Book of Poems, illustrated by Kathleen Garry McCord (1992)
- My First Counting Book (1997)
- Poems Have Roots: New Poems, illustrated by Tad Hills (1997)
- I'm Small, and Other Verses, illustrated by Jill McElmurry (2001)
- While You Were Chasing a Hat, illustrated by Rosanne Litzinger (2001)

=== Little Racoon Series ===
- Little Raccoon and the Thing in the Pool, illustrated by Gloria Fiammenghi (1963)
- Little Raccoon and the Outside World, illustrated by Gloria Fiammenghi (1965)
- Little Raccoon and No Trouble at All, illustrated by Gloria Fiammenghi (1972)
- Little Raccoon and Poems from the Woods, illustrated by Gloria Fiammenghi (1975)
- Little Raccoon Takes Charge (adapted from Little Raccoon and No Trouble at All), illustrated by Deborah Borgo (1986)
- Little Raccoon's Nighttime Adventure, illustrated by Deborah Borgo (1986)
- Little Raccoon, illustrated by Doug Cushman (2001)

== Books adapted into short films ==
- Bear Trouble
- Too Many Bozos
- A Pickle for a Nickel
- Tony the Pony
- Крошка Енот. Soyuzmultfilm , SMF Animation Studio (1974)
