= Yuriy Meshcheryakov =

Soviet, Russian and Ukrainian animator

Yuriy Meshcheryakov Юрий Мещеряков
- Born: Yuriy Victorovich Meshcheryakov; 27 August 1946; Moscow, Soviet Union
- Died: 6 October 2001 (aged 55); Moscow, Russian Federation
- Occupations: animator, art director, artist
- Years active: 1973–2000

Yuriy Victorovich Meshcheryakov (Russian: Юрий Викторович Мещеряков; 27 August 1946 in Moscow – 6 October 2001 in Moscow) was a Soviet, Russian and Ukrainian animator, one of a number of outstanding Soviet animators, who worked at the end of the "golden era" of Soviet animation.

== Biography ==
Yuriy was born in Moscow on 27 August 1946.

In 1965 he graduated from the College of Architecture in Moscow.

He attended a course for animators at the studio "Soyuzmultfilm" in 1971 – 1972 year.

Yuriy Meshcheryakov was invited to work on The Films of The Great Soviet directors like Ivan Ivanov-Vano, Roman Kachanov, Fedor Khitruk and other masters.

He made a unique contribution to fifty cartoon films.

When the Soviet animation lost with the collapse of the USSR, Yuri grieved unemployment and economic crisis.

He died on 6 October 2001.

== Selected filmography ==
=== Art Director ===
- 1989 – The Lake on The Bottom of The Sea (Озеро на дне моря)

=== Animator ===
- 1975 – How the Cossacks Bought the Salt (Как казаки соль покупали)
- 1982 – About an Old Man, an Old Woman and Thiere Hen Ryaba (О деде, бабе и курочке Рябе)
- 1984 – The Tale of Tsar Saltan (Сказака о царе Салтане)
- 1984 – Lev i byk (Лев и бык)
- 1985– Dereza (Дереза)
- 1987 – The Porridge of Bogatyr (Богатызская каша)
- 1988 – The Incident with a Hippopotamus (Случай с бегемотом)
- 1992 – Glasha and Kikimora (Глаша и Кикимора)
- 1995 – People: A Musical Celebration

=== Artist ===
- 1991 – Submarine Berets
