= Big Children's Choir =

Children's choir in Moscow, Russia

The V. S. Popov Big Children's Choir of Russia Today Media (Russian: Большой Детский Хор имени В. С. Попова (БДХ), romanized: Bolshoi Detskiy Khor imeni V. S. Popova (BDKh)) is one of the most popular children's choirs from the former USSR and Russia. It is affiliated with the Rossiya Segodnya agency.

== History ==
The choir was founded in 1970 and is based in Moscow. Its founding chief conductor was professor Victor Popov (1934–2008), People's Artist of the USSR. The choir, originally known as Big Children's Choir of the USSR All-Union National Radio Service and USSR Central Television Networks (Russian: Большой детский хор Всесоюзного радио и Центрального телевидения) honoured its founder by assuming his name in 2008.

The choir has a very large repertoire made of thousands of different musical compositions, including short songs, cantatas, classical music, and Soviet and Russian patriotic songs and folk music. The choir had (and still has) the widest popularity in Soviet and post-Soviet society because of its repertoire for children including songs from children and teenage films, and even sang with well-known singers and starred in its own television programs and specials in the 1980s.

The choir's collection contains compositions written by composers such as Mikhail Glinka, Pyotr Tchaikovsky, Sergei Rachmaninoff, Sergei Prokofiev, Dmitri Shostakovich, Johann Sebastian Bach, Aleksandra Pakhmutova, Vladimir Shainsky, Yevgeny Krylatov, Jury Chichkov etc.

== Popular alumni of the BCC ==
- Alexey Proshkin
- Alexey Stopkin
- Dmitry Galikhin
- Dmitry Golo
- Dmitry Mashnin
- Konstantin Dyukin
- Konstantin Kirillov
- Lena Mogucheva
- Lolita Semenina
- Margarita Suhankina
- Oleg Kasyanov
- Olga Korolkova
- Sergey Kuzyurin
- Sergey Paramonov
- Svetlana Kuleshova
- Tatyana Melekhina
- Vitaliy Nikolaev
- Yuri Korobko
