= Shapoklyak =

Russian fictional character

Old Lady Shapoklyak Russian: Старуха Шапокляк
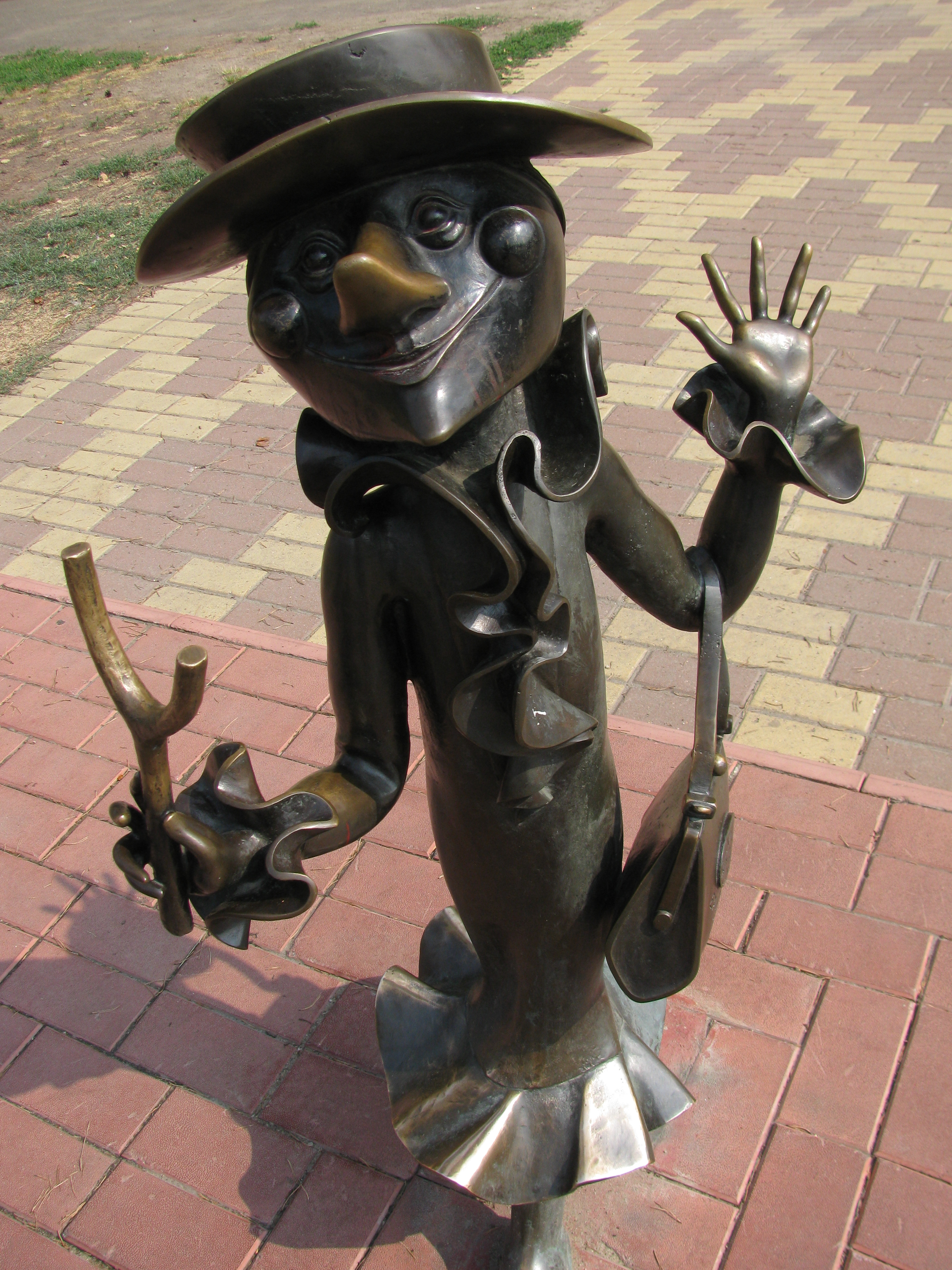
- Shapoklyak in Ramenskoye, Moscow Oblast.
- Created by: Eduard Uspensky

In-universe information
- Species: Human
- Gender: Female

Old Lady Shapoklyak (Russian: Старуха Шапокляк, romanized: Starukha Shapoklyak), often simply known as Shapoklyak, is a fictional character from the children's book Gena the Crocodile and His Friends and its sequels by Russian writer Eduard Uspensky. In the stories, she is notorious for her mischiefs and pranks on the city dwellers, exemplified by her motto "One won't ever get famous for good deeds" (Russian: Хорошими делами прославиться нельзя). However, she occasionally shows compassion helping the protagonists, only to return causing trouble afterwards. Her name is derived from the French term chapeau claque, referring to a collapsible top hat.

== Appearances ==
Bookcover of Eduard Uspensky's book Crocodile Gena and His Friends. Shapoklyak is the old lady with the telescope (bottom left).

- 1966: Uspensky, ''Gena the Crocodile and His Friends
- 1970: Uspensky, Kachanov, «Чебурашка и его друзья» (play)
- 1974: Uspensky, Kachanov, «Отпуск крокодила Гены» (play)
- 1974: Uspensky, «Крокодил Гена и грабители»
- 1992: Uspensky and Inna Agron (Инна Е. Агрон), Gena The Crocodile's Business
- 1998: Uspensky, «Крокодил Гена — лейтенант милиции»
- 1998: Uspensky, «Чебурашка уходит в люди»
- 2001: Uspensky, «Похищение Чебурашки»
- 2001: Uspensky, «Новый год с Чебурашкой»
- 2017: Uspensky, «Чебурашка едет в Сочи»

== Reception ==
Literary scholar Mark Lipovetsky has classified Shapoklyak among the trickster figures of Soviet popular culture, alongside characters such as Carlson and Sherlock Holmes as portrayed in Soviet adaptations.

== Animation ==
- Gena the Crocodile
- Shapoklyak
- Cheburashka Goes to School
- Cheburashka (2010 Japanese animation)
- Cheburashka (2023 Russian remake of the Japanese animation)
- Cheburashka (2023 film)
