= Little Raccoon =

1974 animated film

- Крошка Енот
- Directed by: Oleg Churkin
- Written by: Margarita Dolotseva
- Starring: Klara Rumyanova; Maria Vinogradova; Kapitolina Kuzmina
- Cinematography: Alexander Pekar
- Music by: Vladimir Shainsky
- Production company: Studio Ekran
- Release date: 1974
- Running time: 8 minutes, 51 seconds
- Country: Soviet Union
- Language: Russian

Little Raccoon (Russian: Крошка Енот, romanized: Kroshka Enot) is a Soviet animated film from 1974, adapted from the fairy tale by Lillian Moore titled "Little Raccoon and the Thing in the Pool". It marks the directorial debut of Oleg Churkin.

== Plot ==
Little Raccoon is celebrating his birthday. His mother gives him a task: "go alone, in the dark, to the pond and pick some sweet sedge for dinner." Little Raccoon eagerly sets off along the path his mother pointed out, but the farther he gets from home, the scarier it becomes for him. Finally, he literally runs into Monkey, who frightens him with a story about "the One Who Sits in the Pond," yet Little Raccoon confidently strides onward.

Reaching the pond, the frightened Raccoon tries to talk to "the One Who...," but receives no reply. Leaning over the water's surface, he sees "Him," strikes a menacing pose, and terrified by his own reflection, flees in panic back the way he came. Halfway there, he encounters Monkey again, and it turns out that Little Raccoon had seen a "naughty raccoon" in the pond, while Monkey had seen an "evil monkey." The friends conclude that "they" must be sitting in the pond together. Monkey advises Raccoon to take a stick to scare off "the One Who...". Naturally, Little Raccoon becomes even more frightened of unknown beasts and this time runs all the way home.

Sharing his fears and impressions with his mother, Little Raccoon receives her advice: to smile at "the One Who...". Overcoming his doubts, Raccoon does just that. His reflection smiles back at him. Now unafraid, he calmly picks the sedge and heads home. Along the way, he meets Monkey again and shares the secret of how to befriend "the One Who...," and Monkey immediately dashes off to the pond.

Night turns to day, and the new friends walk together, merrily singing a little song.

At the end of the film, Monkey congratulates Little Raccoon on his birthday and presents him with a pineapple as a gift.

== Cast ==
- Klara Rumyanova as Raccoon
- Maria Vinogradova as Monkey
- Kapitolina Kuzmina as Little Raccoon's mother (uncredited)

== Crew ==
- Screenwriter — Margarita Dolotseva
- Director — Oleg Churkin
- Production Designer — Vyacheslav Nazaruk
- Composer — Vladimir Shainsky
- Lyricist — Mikhail Plyatskovsky
- Cinematographer — Alexander Pekar
- Sound Engineer — Vitaly Azarovsky
- Film Editor — Marina Trusova
- Script Editor — Valeria Konovalova
- Animators: Faina Epifanova, Boris Chani, Elena Vershinina, Antonina Alyoshina, Galina Chernikova, Alexander Sichkar, Lera Rybchevskaya, Irina Belova, Mstislav Kuprach

== See also ==
- History of Russian animation
