= Violetta Kolesnikova =

Russian animator (1938–2022)

Violetta Pavlovna Kolesnikova (Russian: Виолетта Павловна Колесникова; 24 August 1938 – 26 March 2022) was a Russian animator and Honored Artist of the RSFSR (1989). She is known for her work on The Bremen Town Musicians, Winnie-the-Pooh, and The Mystery of the Third Planet.
