= A Little Frog is Looking for His Father =

- Лягушонок ищет папу
- Directed by: Roman Kachanov
- Written by: Gennady Tsyferov, Genrikh Sapgir
- Starring: Klara Rumyanova, Anatoly Papanov, Mikhail Yanshin, Rina Zelyonaya, Erast Garin, Vladimir Gertsik
- Cinematography: Joseph Golomb
- Music by: Michael Ziv
- Release date: February 8, 1964
- Running time: 10 min
- Country: USSR
- Language: Russian

A Little Frog is Looking for His Father (Russian: Лягушонок ищет папу) is a 1964 Soviet stop-motion animated film by Roman Kachanov, produced by the Soyuzmultfilm studio.

== Plot summary ==
The Little Frog is looking for, but can not find a dad, who can protect him and play with him. He runs into various animals and asks them to become his dad. All these animals are larger than The Little Frog, and those animals did not want to become the frog's dad. But suddenly, The Little Frog sees a little grasshopper crying, who also has no father. So, The Little Frog says to The Little Grasshopper, "Do not cry. I'll be Your Dad...".

== Creators ==
	English	Russian
Director	Roman Kachanov	Роман Качанов
Writers	Gennady Tsyferov, Genrikh Sapgir	Геннадий Цыферов, Генрих Сапгир
Art Director	Vladimir Sobolev	Владимир Соболев
Animators	Pavel Petrov, Kirill Malyantovich, Yury Kuziurin, Lev Popov	Павел Петров, Кирилл Малянтович, Юрий Кузюрин, Лев Попов
Puppets and decor	Svetlana Znamenskaya, F. Oleinikov, Pavel Gusev, Roman Gurov, V. Kalashnikova, Boris Karavaev, Vladimir Abbakumov, Oleg Massainov, Marina Chesnokova	Светлана Знаменская, Ф. Олейников, Павел Гусев, Роман Гуров, В. Калашникова, Борис Караваев, Владимир Аббакумов, Олег Масаинов, Марина Чеснокова
Camera	Joseph Golomb	Иосиф Голомб
Music	Michael Ziv	Михаил Зив
Sound	George Martynuk	Георгий Мартынюк
Artists	Alexander Maximov, Liliana Lutinskaya	Александр Максимов, Лилиана Лютницкая
Voice Actors	Klara Rumyanova, Anatoly Papanov, Mikhail Yanshin, Rina Zelyonaya, Erast Garin, Vladimir Gertsik	Клара Румянова, Анатолий Папанов, Михаил Яншин, Рина Зеленая, Эраст Гарин, Владимир Герцик
