= Gena the Crocodile (film) =

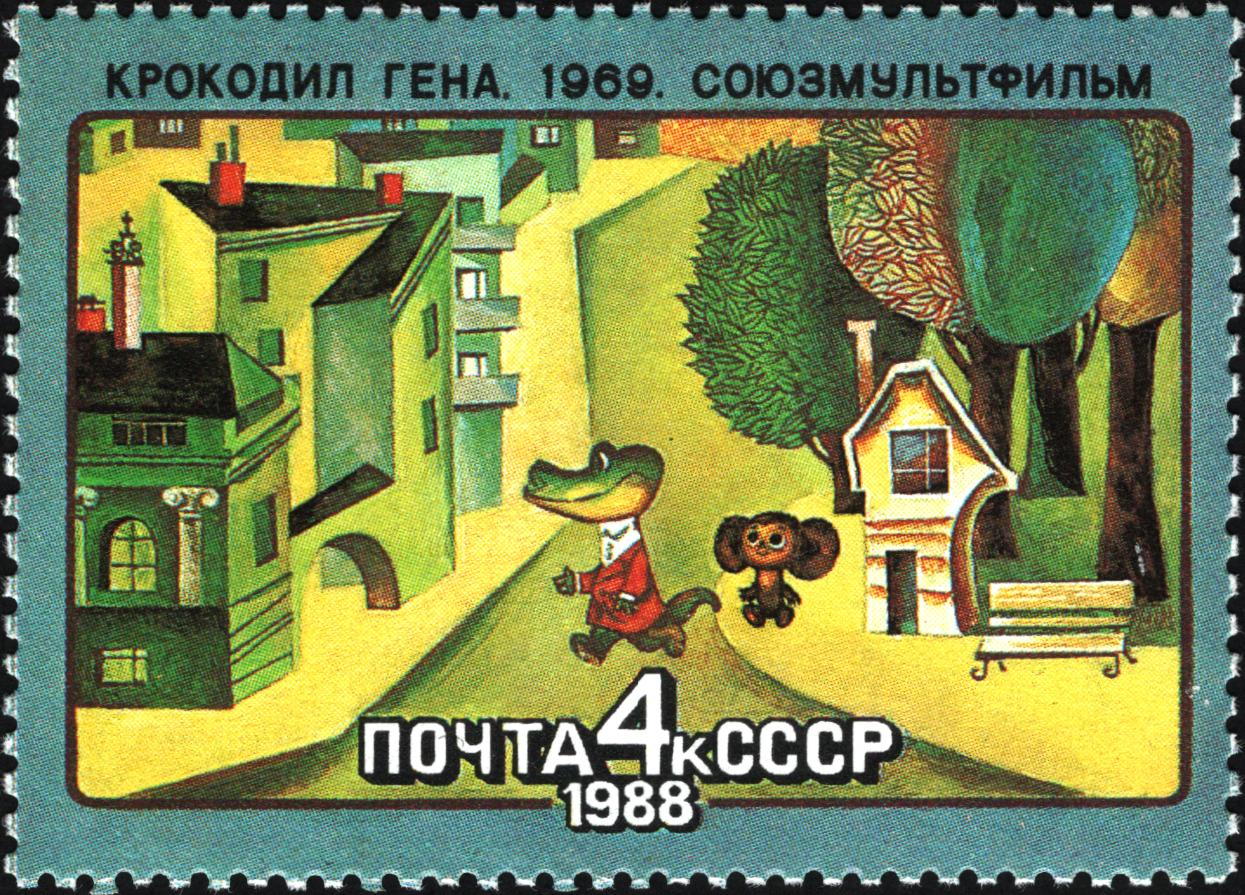
- USSR stamp depicting Gena and Cheburashka, 1988.
- Russian: Крокодил Гена
- Directed by: Roman Kachanov
- Written by: Eduard Uspensky; Roman Kachanov
- Cinematography: Iosif Golomb
- Edited by: Lidiya Kyaksht
- Music by: Mikhail Ziv
- Production company: Studio Ekran
- Release date: 31 December 1969
- Running time: 19 min 24 sec
- Country: Soviet Union
- Language: Russian

Gena the Crocodile (Russian: Крокодил Гена, romanized: Krokodil Gena) is a 1969 Soviet stop motion animated film directed by Roman Kachanov in Studio Ekran studio. This film introduces the characters Gena the Crocodile, Cheburashka, and the old lady Shapoklyak. The film was based on Eduard Uspensky's stories about the characters.

This film was popular in the Soviet Union and spawned three sequels: Cheburashka (1972), Shapoklyak (1974) and Cheburashka Goes to School (1983).

== Plot ==
Gena the Crocodile works as an attraction at an urban zoo, spending his days performing and returning each evening to his solitary apartment. Growing tired of playing chess by himself, Gena decides to find friends and posts advertisements around the city. His efforts are soon rewarded when various animals and people respond. First comes a girl named Galya with a homeless puppy named Tobik. They are soon joined by the mysterious and lovable creature Cheburashka, who is discovered inside a box of oranges. Later, a lion named Chandr arrives, confessing that he has no friends, to which Tobik happily offers his friendship.

Together, the group decides to build a "House of Friends," a space where all the lonely residents of the city can gather and connect. However, their plans face opposition from the mischievous old lady Shapoklyak, notorious for her pranks and troublemaking. Shapoklyak does her best to disrupt their work, but the friends remain determined and united.

As the construction of the "House of Friends" progresses, the group grows even closer, realizing the power of their newfound friendships. In the end, the completed house is donated to a children’s daycare, where Cheburashka finds a new purpose as a beloved toy. Even Shapoklyak undergoes a change of heart, handing Cheburashka a note that reads, "I won’t cause trouble anymore! — Shapoklyak."

== Creators ==
- Scriptwriters: Eduard Uspensky, Roman Kachanov
- Film director: Roman Kachanov
- Art director: Leonid Shvartsman
- Operator: Iosif Golomb
- Composer: Mikhail Ziv
- Sound technician: Georgy Martynyuk
- Dolls and scenery: Semyon Etlis, Marina Chesnokova, Pavel Lesin, Gennady Lyutinsky, Svetlana Znamenskaya, Oleg Masainov, Valentin Ladygin, Liliana Luetinskaja, V. Kalashnikova, E. Darikovich
- Installation: Lidiya Kyaksht

== Cast ==
- Vasily Livanov as Gena the Crocodile (voice)
- Klara Rumyanova as Cheburashka (voice)
- Vladimir Rautbart as Shapoklyak (voice)
- Vladimir Kenigson as Salesman (voice)
- Tamara Dmitrieva as Galya (voice)
