= Mountain of Dinosaurs =

1967 film directed by Rasa Strautmane

- Гора динозавров (1967) (baby dinosaurs just hatched by the sun)
- Directed by: Rasa Strautmane
- Written by: Arkadiy Snesarev
- Produced by: Soyuzmultfilm
- Starring: Klara Rumyanova; I. Smiov; Lev Lyubetskiy; Viktor Rozhdestvenskiy
- Cinematography: Y. Petrova
- Edited by: A. Timofeevski
- Music by: V. Dashkevich
- Release date: 1967
- Running time: 9 min 38 sec
- Country: USSR
- Language: Russian

Mountain of Dinosaurs or Dinosaurs Hill (Russian: Гора динозавров) is a 1967 Soviet animated film directed by Rasa Strautmane and produced by the Soyuzmultfilm studio in Moscow.

== Plot ==
The story follows the lives of dinosaurs as they fall in love and have children, their eggs hatched by the hot sun as their parents look on. As the weather begins to cool, the shells begin to thicken, refusing to let the dinosaur babies leave, eventually resulting in their extinction.

== Legacy ==
The film is generally interpreted as a subversive commentary on the dangers of the authoritarian state.

The film is one of the oldest among the forty-five (45) animated Soviet-era shorts in the four-DVD or digital video disc collection "Masters of Russian Animation" (1997), which Soyuzmultfilm released in conjunction with Films by Jove.

== See also ==
- History of Russian animation
