= Klara Rumyanova =

Soviet-Russian actress, voice actress, singer (1929–2004)

Klara Mikhailovna Rumyanova
- Клара Михайловна Румянова
- Born: Klara Mikhailovna Rumyanova; 8 December 1929; Leningrad, RSFSR, Soviet Union
- Died: 18 September 2004 (aged 74); Moscow, Russia
- Occupations: Actress; voice actress; singer
- Years active: 1951–1999
- Awards: Honored Artist of the RSFSR

Klara Mikhailovna Rumyanova (Note: Some English translations list her first/given name as "Clara".) (Russian: Кла́ра Миха́йловна Румя́нова; 8 December 1929 – 18 September 2004) was a Soviet and Russian actress, voice actress and singer. She was active from 1951 to 1999.

Her childlike and endearing voice was easily recognized by generations of Soviet people from their early childhood, because she voiced numerous Russian animated films and sang countless children's songs. After the dissolution of the Soviet Union her songs have been heard even more, because of numerous releases of compact discs and tapes of children's songs from cartoons of the Soyuzmultfilm studio. She played roles in several films.

== Biography ==
Klara Rumyanova was born on 8 December 1929 in Leningrad. In 1947, Klara moved to Moscow and on the first attempt she entered VGIK, where she studied at the course of Sergei Gerasimov and Tamara Makarova.

In childhood and adolescence, Klara had a completely different voice, a contralto. The ability to speak with her famous child-like voice she found only in her student years after a serious illness. Klara, like all the students of VGIK, toured with concerts on the Moscow Oblast and once she was very cold and almost died of croupous inflammation of the lungs. After lying in the hospital for more than a month, Klara lost her voice. The continued study at the VGIK was in jeopardy. Sergei Gerasimov showed her to a phoniatrician, but he explained that Klara has very rare vocal cords and he does not guarantee that she will be able to properly practice vocal after recovery. For half a year Gerasimov forbade Rumyanova to talk even in a whisper, and they communicated through writing. When her voice recovered, Rumyanova suddenly discovered that she could now speak in a very high voice, which came to be familiar to millions of moviegoers. In 1953, Klara graduated from VGIK and became an actress of the National Film Actors' Theatre.

As a student she started acting in film, her cinematic debut took place as an episodic role in the film The Village Doctor (1951), by the same Gerasimov. However, in the future Klara played only supporting or episodic roles, never playing the main ones. Her notable roles were in the films The Village Doctor (Lena), Resurrection (Bogodukhovskaya), Time, Forward! (Lushka) and The Twelve Chairs (Katerina Aleksandrovna). Gradually, she was less likely to be offered roles, and she practically stopped filming, which was allegedly caused by a conflict with Ivan Pyryev. For six years (from 1965 to 1970), Klara Rumyanova did not act in film at all, until the Minister of Culture Ekaterina Furtseva dismissed Pyryev from the post of the general director. A year before his death, Pyryev phoned Rumyanova and apologized to her for his behavior.

For the first time, Klara applied her "child" voice in her debut film The Rural Doctor, where she played a woman in childbirth. While the scene was being prepared, the baby, who was supposed to represent the newborn, fell asleep, and at first could not be awaken for a long time, and then it was found that it was impossible to make him cry. Then Klara volunteered herself on the set to voice the scene. After that, Rumyanova secretly became famous at the whole Mosfilm, as an actress, able to scream in any child's voice, so that, she combined acting in film and voicing, where her voice was often used for young children. Then she began to receive the first invitations from the film studio Soyuzmultfilm, but Klara rejected them, considering her acting potential as higher than merely voicing cartoons. However, she was rarely invited to act in feature films which eventually forced her to do voice work. Her debut in animation was the cartoon The Wonderful Garden (1962). Gradually during this period, Klara began to cooperate more actively with Soyuzmultfilm, and as a result, at a time when she was no longer shooting, she became very popular as a voice actress and began to record on the radio and perform on the stage with children's songs and romances.

She became the only actress of the USSR to be awarded Honored Artist of the RSFSR for her work in animation. Despite this, she was very worried because she could not play in live action films, because she always considered herself a dramatic actress.

After the dissolution of the Soviet Union and the subsequent economic crisis, Rumyanova, like many actors, gradually became unemployed (she was dismissed from the National Film Actors' Theatre) and only occasionally took part in the recording of audio and audio concerts and the production of radio plays. However, even during this period, she was very selective – the general director of the studio "VOX-Records" Viktor Trukhan recalled that Rumyanova basically refused to record for audio advertising. Without work, she wrote several plays, in 2000 she published the book "My Name is a Woman" – an author's collection of her plays about significant female characters of Russian history (Nadezhda Durova, Yekaterina Vorontsova-Dashkova, Evdokiya Rostopchina).

Klara negatively spoke about Gorbachev's perestroika, the dissolution of the Soviet Union and the policies of President Yeltsin; remained a convinced supporter of communism for the rest of her life.

During her last years, Rumyanova was living in a complete loneliness and depression. She stopped going outside, never watched TV and never talked to anyone. She was repeatedly talking to herself: "No mother, no country, no job... What's the meaning of life?" and had thoughts about committing suicide. In 1999, Rumyanova survived through the clinical death. The artist had absolutely no money to buy a medicine or hire a nurse. Her neighbour took care of her.

Rumyanova's health was getting worse each day. She started to lose consciousness more frequently. Four days before her death, she woke up at midnight, fell down unconscious and couldn't get back up, which caused pneumonia. She lay on the floor until morning when her neighbour came in.

She died at the age of 74 on 18 September 2004 in Moscow from breast cancer. She was buried at the Donskoye Cemetery right next to her mother.

== Personal life ==
- First husband (1947) — Leonid, a young pianist. The marriage with him lasted for three months and ended when Rumyanova was about to go to VGIK. Her husband gave her a choice: either him or studying at VGIK, and she chose the latter option. She also was two months pregnant, but due to prohibition of abortion in USSR, she had it in secret from her parents. As a result, Rumyanova could no longer have any children.
- Second husband (middle 1960s—1973) — Anatoly Chemodurov, a Soviet actor. After the marriage, Chemodurov's friend Sergei Bondarchuk offered Rumyanova a role in his movie "War and Peace". However, due to Rumyanova's aggressive behaviour during the repetitions, Bondarchuk replaced her with Antonina Shuranova. After Rumyanova started working with Soyuzmultfilm in 1960s, Chemodurov started drinking a lot, which resulted in a soon divorce.
- Third husband (1977–1982) — a long-distant sailor, who was very jealous. After a divorce with him, Rumyanova lived alone until her death.

== Filmography ==
=== Live action ===
- The Village Doctor (1951) as Lena Zuyeva (also provided crying noises of the newborn baby)
- A Groom from the Other World (1958) as Klava, nurse
- Resurrection (1960) as Vera Yefremovna Bogodukhovskaya
- Time, Forward! (1965) as Lushka
- They're Calling, Open the Door (1965) as Klara Mikhailovna, teacher (uncredited)
- Andrei Rublev (1966) as Grand Duke's children's voices
- Anna Karenina (1967) as Seryozha's voice
- Viy (1967) as Pannochka's voice (role played by Natalya Varley)
- The Twelve Chairs (1971) as Katerina Aleksandrovna
- It Can't Be! (1975) as wedding guest (uncredited)
- The Adventures of Buratino (1975) as Snail's voice
- How Czar Peter the Great Married Off His Moor (1976) as Gavrilo Rtishchev's wife
- Ma-ma (1976) as Mityai's voice
- Air Crew (1979) as passenger with son
- Per Aspera Ad Astra (1981) as robot Glasha's voice (2001 version)
- Dead Souls (1984) as Chichikov's mother

=== Voice acting in animation ===
- A Little Frog is Looking for His Father (1964) as Grasshopper
- Vovka in the Faraway Tsardom (1965) as Vasilisa the Wise / Goldfish
- Rikki-Tikki-Tavi (1965) as Rikki
- Most, Most, Most, Most (1966) as Little Crocodile / Ant
- Mountain of Dinosaurs (1967) as Baby Dinosaur
- The Little Steam Engine from Romashkov (1967) as The Little Steam Engine
- Junior and Karlson (1968) as Junior
- Adventures of Mowgli (1968–70) as Baby Elephant / Little Porcupine (Episode 2) and Wolf Cub (Episode 4)
- Ded Moroz and Summer (1969) as Hare / Girl
- Gena the Crocodile (1969) as Cheburashka
- Well, Just You Wait! (1969–93) as the Hare
- Umka (1969) as the Boy
- Karlson Returns (1970) as Junior
- Cheburashka (1971) as Cheburashka
- Shapoklyak (1974) as Cheburashka
- Little Raccoon (1974) as Little Raccoon
- Timka and Dimka (1975) as Timka
- Tyram! Hello! (1980) as The Hedgehog
- Maria, Mirabela (1981) as Omide (Soviet dub)
- Mom for a Mammoth Baby (1981) as Baby Mammoth
- Winter's Tale (1981) as The Hedgehog
- A Wonderful Barrel (1983) as The Hedgehog
- Cheburashka Goes to School (1983) as Cheburashka
- Welcome (1986) as Magpie / Lynx
- Laughter and Grief by the White Sea (1987) as Zhuzha the Dog
- Dunno on the Moon (1997) as Romashka / Minoga
