= Two Tickets to India =

Two tickets to India Два билета в Индию
- Directed by: Roman Kachanov
- Written by: Kir Bulychov
- Produced by: Soyuzmultfilm
- Starring: Vladimir Ferapontov, Youry Volyntsev, Olga Gromova, Youry Andreyev, Alexander Kaidanovsky
- Cinematography: Kabul Rasulov
- Edited by: Elena Beliavskaya
- Music by: Yury Saulsky
- Release date: June 4, 1985 (USSR)
- Running time: 20 minutes
- Country: Soviet Union
- Language: Russian

Two tickets to India (Russian: Два билета в Индию, Dva bileta v Indiu) is a 1985 Soviet/Russian traditionally animated short film directed Roman Kachanov. It was produced at the Soyuzmultfilm studio in Moscow and is based on the story of the same name by Kir Bulychov. Compared to the book the story was significantly shortened.

== Plot ==
The astronauts from the planet Geda fly to India on a symposium on animal protection of the Galaxy. As a result of a technical malfunction one of them finds himself in a Young Pioneer camp near Moscow. He looks exactly like a tiger, so he cannot travel by himself. With the help of the girl of Yulya and her grandmother, the astronaut manages to reach India.
