= Eduard Uspensky =

Russian writer (1937–2018)

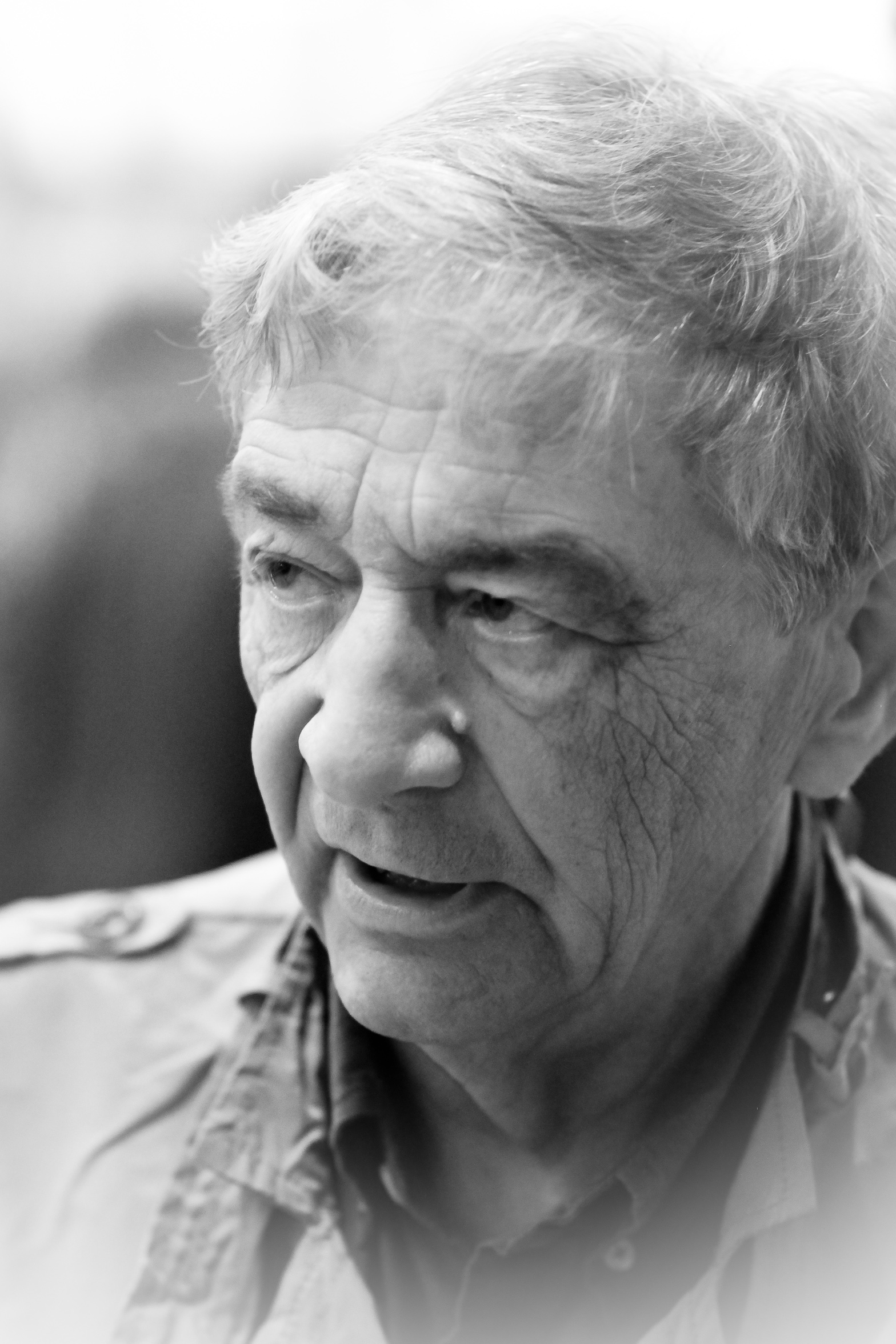
- Uspensky in 2011
- Born: Eduard Nikolayevich Uspensky; 22 December 1937; Yegoryevsk, Soviet Union
- Died: 14 August 2018 (aged 80); Moscow, Russia
- Education: Moscow Aviation Institute
- Occupations: Writer, screenwriter, poet, presenter
- Writing career
- Period: 1960–2018
- Genre: Children's literature

Eduard Nikolayevich Uspensky (Russian: Эдуард Николаевич Успенский; 22 December 1937 – 14 August 2018) was a Soviet and Russian children's writer and poet, author of over 70 books, as well as a playwright, screenwriter and TV presenter. His works have been translated into 25 languages and spawned around 60 cartoon adaptations. Among the characters he created are Cheburashka and Gena the Crocodile, Uncle Fyodor and Kolobki brothers. He was awarded Order "For Merit to the Fatherland", 4th class in 1997.

== Biography ==
Uspensky was born in Yegoryevsk, in Moscow Oblast into a Russian family. His father Nikolai Mikhailovich Uspensky came from the city of Yelets and was a distant relative of Tikhon Khrennikov. He served as a high-ranking official in the Central Committee of the Communist Party of the Soviet Union. Eduard's mother Natalia Alekseyevna Uspenskaya (nee Dzurova) was an engineering technologist from Vyshny Volochyok. She came from a merchantry social estate. Her paternal ancestors were Poles who were resettled in Russia after one of the Polish uprisings.

In 1941 with the start of the war the family was evacuated to Siberia where they spent two years. They returned to Moscow later on. After graduating as an engineer, Uspensky earned his living by writing and producing animations.

Besides writing and producing, Uspensky has enjoyed a professional role as a long-lasting figure in radio and television. He was among the founders of the Russian children's TV series Good Night, Little Ones! and ABVGDeyka, and the popular children's radio program Radio Nanny produced with the aim of featuring songs and humorous dialogue as integral elements of an educational radio program explaining concepts in grammar, mathematics, scientific subjects, and courteous behavior to children.

From 1991 to 2016 he hosted the musical TV and radio talk show Ships Used to Enter Our Harbour where he and his guests recollected the urban folklore songs, which included Russian chanson and blatnaya pesnya. The songs were performed by both professional and amateur singers, politicians, actors and people of various occupations.

In addition to children's books, Uspensky's creative output also includes plays and poems.

== Death ==
Uspensky was diagnosed with stomach cancer 10 years before his death, which later went into remission in 2011 after chemotherapy treatment. His cancer later re-emerged and he succumbed to it on 14 August 2018 in his country house (Puchkovo village, part of Moscow's Troitsky Administrative Okrug). He was buried at the Troyekurovskoye Cemetery.

== Political positions ==
In 2014, in an interview with the television channel Rain, he condemned Russian foreign policy towards Ukraine and anti-Ukrainian propaganda on the central television channels.

Television had been convincing Russians for more than a year that there were fascists operating in Ukraine, that Crimea had long been Russian, and therefore we were taking it back, while the Russian-speaking population in Donbas was being subjected to various kinds of repression, that the Russian language was being banned there, and so on. Television showed footage, and viewers were persuaded of this: if they could not convince the husband, they would convince the wife... And it is difficult for Russian people to be alone in a group where everyone thinks differently.

The country was divided into 10% smart people and 90% idiots. I consider myself to be among the 10% smart people, because this whole story with Crimea is outrageous.

== Uspensky's work in literature ==
Uspensky's first book about Uncle Fyodor, Uncle Fedya, His Dog, and His Cat, was first published in Russian in 1974. The main character is a six-year-old boy who is referred to as 'Uncle Fyodor' because he appears serious-minded, self-reliant and responsible. After his parents don't let him keep Matroskin, a talking cat, Uncle Fyodor leaves his home. With the dog Sharik, the three set up a home in the country, a village called Prostokvashino (Простоквашино, from the Russian for buttermilk, простоквашa). After finding a treasure, Uncle Fyodor can afford to buy a tractor that runs on soup and potatoes, and a portable sun to do the heating during the winter. The book was made into a successful animated film, Three from Prostokvashino (and its two sequels). Uspensky continued with Uncle Fyodor in other books, which have not, however, been as successful. Uspensky published other books with human-like animal characters.

== Selected books ==
- Crocodile Gene and His Friends (1966)
- Uncle Fedya, His Dog, and His Cat (1974) on archive.org
- The Little Warranty People (1975)

== Selected screenplays ==
- Gena the Crocodile (1969)
- Happy Merry-Go-Round No. 1 (1969), No. 3 (1971), No. 19 (1988)
- Cheburashka (1971)
- Bird Market (1974)
- Shapoklyak (1974)
- Little Octopuses (1976)
- Three from Prostokvashino (1978)
- Uncle AU (1979)
- Holidays in Prostokvashino (1980)
- Plasticine Crow (1981)
- Along Unknown Paths (1982)
- Cheburashka Goes to School (1983)
- Winter in Prostokvashino (1984)
- About Sidorov Vova (1985)
- About Vera and Anfisa (1986)
- Investigation Led by Kolobki (1986–1987)
- The Fixies (2010)
- Cheburashka (2013)
