= The Mitten (film) =

The Mitten Варежка
- Directed by: Roman Kachanov
- Written by: Zhanna Vitenzon
- Cinematography: Iosif Golomb
- Edited by: Nadezhda Treshchyova
- Music by: Vadim Gavmalija
- Release date: June 6, 1967
- Running time: 10 minutes
- Country: USSR
- Language: Russian

The Mitten (Russian: Варежка, Varezhka) is a 1967 Soviet animated film directed by Roman Kachanov. The film received international recognition.

The film tells the story of how a girl’s wish for a dog comes to life when her red mitten transforms into a magical knitted puppy, teaching her mother the power of understanding and compassion.

== Plot ==
A young girl dreams of having a dog, but her strict and busy mother refuses to allow it. Undeterred, the girl visits her neighbors, who own a black dog, and asks for a puppy. When the puppy has an accident in their apartment, however, her mother insists it be returned. Saddened, the girl spends time in the yard, watching other children playing with their dogs. Left with her vivid imagination, she begins pretending her red knitted mitten is her own puppy. Her longing becomes so strong that the mitten magically transforms into a living, breathing puppy, still retaining its knitted texture and a pattern of three black checkers on its back. The knitted puppy barks, plays in the snow, and lovingly licks her cheeks, bringing the girl immense joy.

Filled with excitement, the girl takes her magical puppy to a dog show, where pets compete in various events. The knitted puppy performs well, quickly retrieving a stick and heading toward the finish line. However, during the obstacle course, it catches a loop on a nail and loses the competition, reverting to its original form as a mitten. Heartbroken, the girl brings the mitten home and pours milk into a bowl, hoping it will transform back into a puppy. Her mother notices her sadness and, moved by her daughter’s longing, goes to the neighbors to ask for a puppy. When the mother holds the puppy and it licks her face, she smiles warmly and embraces it, finally understanding her daughter's desire.

== Creators ==
- Dolls and scenery made — Pavel Gusyov, Oleg Masainov, V. Petrov, M. Chesnokova, G. Gettinger, G. Lyutinsky, A. Maximov, V. Kalashnikova, V. Kuranov, S. Etlis, leadership the Roman Gurov
- Film editor — Vera Gokke
- Editor — Natalya Abramova
- Director — Nathan Bitman

== Awards ==
- MKF in Moscow — a silver medal in competition of children's movies, the movie "The Mitten" (1967)
- Annecy International Animation Film Festival — the first award, the movie "The Mitten" (1967)
- Gijón International Film Festival — a prize of the city of Gijón "For high art quality of animation", the movie "The Mitten" (1968)
- Gijón International Film Festival — the Grand Prix "A gold plate", the movie "The Mitten" (1968)
- All-Union Film Festival — the first award, the movie "The Mitten" (1968)

== Interesting facts ==
- There is no dialogue in the film.
- Leonid Shvartsman based the character of the mother on a very close acquaintance — Tamara Vladimirovna Poletika (the first wife of his friend and animator Lev Milchin).
- The bulldog in “The Mitten” is based on the director, Roman Kachanov.
