= Dereza (film) =

Dereza Дереза
- Directed by: Alexander Davydov
- Written by: Roman Kachanov
- Starring: Nina Zorskaya; Anatoly Barantsev; Irina Muravyova
- Cinematography: Alexander Chekhovsky
- Edited by: N. Bordzilovskaya
- Music by: Nina Savicheva
- Release date: January 1, 1985
- Running time: 10 minutes
- Country: USSR
- Language: Russian

Dereza (Russian: Дереза) is a 1985 Soviet animated short musical film by Alexander Davydov. This cartoon was created by Soyuzmultfilm studio. The film received national and international recognition.

Based on a Russian folk tale, the film follows Dereza, a talented but lazy goat who disrupts an old man's peaceful household by cunningly manipulating him against his family—until her true nature is revealed.

== Plot ==
Once upon a time, there was an old man who lived in a small cottage with his wife, a rabbit named Trusha, and a rooster named Kiryusha. They all lived happily together until the old man brought home a goat named Dereza, who he had taken in for free from a train station after she told him tales of her cruel former owner. The old man felt sorry for Dereza and took her home, but soon the goat started manipulating him, pretending to be pitiful and subtly turning him against the other housemates. When the old woman asked Dereza to fetch some water, the old man got angry, saying that Dereza should be spared any work and deserved rest instead.

One night, Dereza decided to chase Kiryusha the rooster out of the house, crowing loudly and creating chaos. Annoyed, the old man expelled the rooster. Later, while the old man and woman were outside working, Dereza spotted a cabbage head the old woman had saved to make pies, ate it all, and left only the stem for Trusha the rabbit. The old man, angry at Trusha, sent him away too, despite the old woman’s protests, while Dereza strolled off to graze.

Out in the meadow, Dereza sang a song to the other goats about how wonderful her life was in the cottage and hinted that once she drove out the old couple, she would invite them all to live with her there. Overhearing this, the old man rushed back and shared the news, prompting the old woman to expel Dereza, saying, "Go wherever you like!" But later, when the family decided to forgive her, Dereza returned, carrying a bucket of water, and declared to the old woman, "You told me to go where I like, so I just went to fetch some water!"

== Creators ==
	English	Russian
Director	Alexander Davydov	Александр Давыдов
Writer	Roman Kachanov	Роман Качанов
Art Director	Anatoly Savchenko	Анатолий Савченко
Animators	Yuriy Meshcheryakov, Vitaly Bobrov, Alexander Mazaev, Alexander Dorogov, Galina Zolotovskaya	Юрий Мещеряков, Виталий Бобров, Александр Мазаев, Александр Дорогов, Галина Золотовская
Artists	Irina Svetlitsa, E. Antusheva, V. Kharitonova, Alexander Markelov	Ирина Светлица, Э. Антушева, В. Харитонова, Александр Маркелов
Camera	Alexander Chekhovsky	Александр Чеховский
Music	Nina Savicheva	Нина Савичева
Sound	Vladimir Kutuzov	Владимир Кутузов
Executive Producer	V. Yegorshin	В. Егоршин
Voice Actors	Nina Zorskaya, Anatoly Barantsev, Irina Muravyova	Нина Зорская, Анатолий Баранцев, Ирина Муравьева
Editor	N. Bordzilovskaya	Н. Бордзиловская
Texts of Songs	Alexander Timofeyevsky	Александр Тимофеевский
Script Editor	Tatiana Paporova	Татьяна Папорова
