= Roman Kachanov (animator) =

Soviet animator

- Роман Качанов
- Born: Ruvim Abelevich Kachanov; 25 February 1921; Smolensk, Russian SFSR, Soviet Union
- Died: 4 July 1993 (aged 72); Moscow, Russia
- Other name: Roman Kachanov Sr.
- Occupations: Film director; Screenwriter; Art director; Animator
- Years active: 1946–1989
- Spouse: Gara Kachanova

Roman Abelevich Kachanov (Russian: Роман Абелевич Качанов; 25 February 1921 – 4 July 1993) was a Soviet animator who worked primarily in the stop-motion animation technique. He directed the popular series of films about Cheburashka: Gena the Crocodile, Cheburashka, Shapoklyak and Cheburashka Goes to School.

== Life ==
=== Early years ===
Kachanov was born in 1921 in Smolensk to a Jewish family. His mother was Haya Yakovlevna Kachanova; his father, Abel Mendelevich Kachanov, was a shoemaker. His mother died in 1932, when he was 11 years old. In spring 1939, Kachanov was called up for military service in the Red Army in the town of Chkalovsky, near Moscow. This deployment separated him permanently from his father and his only, older sister Maria (both were killed in Smolensk during the Holocaust).

After attending flying school in Krasnoyarsk, Kachanov flew fighter planes as a tail gunner. In 1940, the plane Kachanov was flying crashed. The pilot was killed; Kachanov was hospitalized with serious injuries. In spring 1941, Kachanov entered the Moscow State University of Railway Engineering. From 1941 to 1945, he served in the airborne forces as a parachute instructor and took part in special operations behind enemy lines. In 1945, due to Kachanov's war service he was promoted to sergeant. Even before demobilization in 1946, he decided to work in cinema and transferred to service at the Ministry of Defence studio in the Bolshevo.

=== Career ===
After demobilization, Kachanov went to Soyuzmultfilm and studied animation. From 1947 to 1957 he worked as animator, assistant director and production designer for film directors and animators of the older generation: Dmitry Babichenko, Valentina and Zinaida Brumberg, Lev Atamanov, Ivan Ivanov-Vano and Vladimir Polkovnikov (whom Kachanov regarded as his directing mentor).

In 1958, Kachanov and Anatoly Karanovich directed his first film, The Old Man and the Crane. In 1959 he directed Nazim Hikmet's screenplay in Love Cloud, which received awards at festivals in Annecy, Oberhausen and Bucharest. With assistant work in the past, directing these two films gave him the experience to later switch primarily to directing. Kachanov's films The Mitten, Crocodile Gena and The Mystery of the Third Planet have become Russian classics.

=== The Mitten ===
In 1967 Kachanov's animated film, The Mitten, received widespread international and domestic recognition. It became a 20th-century international animation classic.

=== Trilogy: Gena the Crocodile, Cheburashka and Shapoklyak ===
These three films (and a fourth, 1983's Cheburashka Goes to School) created the animated characters of Cheburashka, Crocodile Gena and old woman Shapoklyak, who entered Russian culture and are still referenced in audiovisual, pop-cultural and folkloric works.

=== The Mystery of the Third Planet ===
The animated cult SF film is based on a story by Kir Bulychov, "Alice's Journey".

== Selected filmography ==
- 1951 — The Night Before Christmas (animator)
- 1952 — The Snow Maiden (animator)
- 1952 — The Scarlet Flower (assistant director, animator)
- 1955 — The Enchanted Boy (art director)
- 1958 — An Old Man and The Crane (director, screenwriter)
- 1959 — The Cloud in Love (director)
- 1960 — Little Masha and The Bear (director)
- 1961 — Novice (director)
- 1962 — The Injury (director)
- 1963 — How The House was built to The Kitten (director)
- 1964 — Alesha's Tales (director)
- 1964 — A Little Frog Is looking for His Father (director)
- 1965 — The Portrait (director)
- 1966 — The Granddaughter was lost (director)
- 1967 — The Mitten (director)
- 1968 — Rivals (director)
- 1969 — Crocodile Gena (director, screenwriter)
- 1970 — The Letter (director)
- 1972 — Cheburashka (director, screenwriter)
- 1972 — Mama (director)
- 1973 — Aurore (director, screenwriter)
- 1974 — The Heron and the Crane (screenwriter)
- 1974 — Shapoklyak (director, screenwriter)
- 1975 — The Inheritance of The Magician Bakhram (director, screenwriter)
- 1977 — The Last Petal (director, screenwriter)
- 1978 — Metamorphosis (director, screenwriter)
- 1981 — The Mystery of the Third Planet (director)
- 1982 — The Magic Medicine (director)
- 1982 — About an Old Man, an Old Woman and Thiere Hen Ryaba (screenwriter)
- 1983 — Cheburashka Goes to School (director, screenwriter)
- 1985 — Two Tickets to India (director)
- 1985 — Dereza (screenwriter)
- 1986 — The Miracles of Technology (director)
- 1989 — The Newcomer in The Cabbage (screenwriter)

== See also ==
- Kachanov's son, Roman Romanovich Kachanov, is a film director, screenwriter and actor.
