= Gena the Crocodile =

Book and film character

Gena the Crocodile Russian: Крокодил Гена
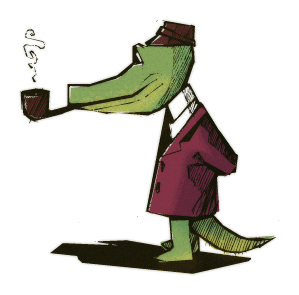
- Created by: Eduard Uspensky
- Designed by: Eduard Uspensky; Roman Kachanov & his companions Makoto Nakamura; Dmitry Dyachenko & his equipes
- Voiced by: Vasily Livanov
- Motion capture: Vasily Livanov (1969-1983); Ưng Hoàng Phúc (2003); Vladimir Ferapontov (2013); Garri Bardin (1990-2013); Diomid Vinogradov (2018); Leonid Yarmolnik (2020); Dima Bilan (2020); Sergey Garmash (2023); Artyom Bystrov (2023)

In-universe information
- Alias: Krakadil
- Nickname: African crocodile
- Gender: ♂
- Occupation: Himself; Model
- Family: Cheburashka (his comrade)
- Origin: Guinea
- Nationality: Soviet Union → Russia

Gena the Crocodile (Russian: Крокодил Гена, romanized: Krokodil Gena) is a fictional character found in Russian media, particularly animation.

== History ==
Gena is known as a friendly crocodile in the series of animation films Gena the Crocodile, Cheburashka and Shapoklyak by Roman Kachanov (Soyuzmultfilm studio). He debuted in the 1966 novel Gena the Crocodile and His Friends by Eduard Uspensky. Ben Hellman compares him to the anthropomorphic crocodile in a 1917 poem by Korney Chukovsky. The crocodile's name is a typical diminutive of the Russian male name Gennady. Gena and Cheburashka, also a title character in the series, are best friends.

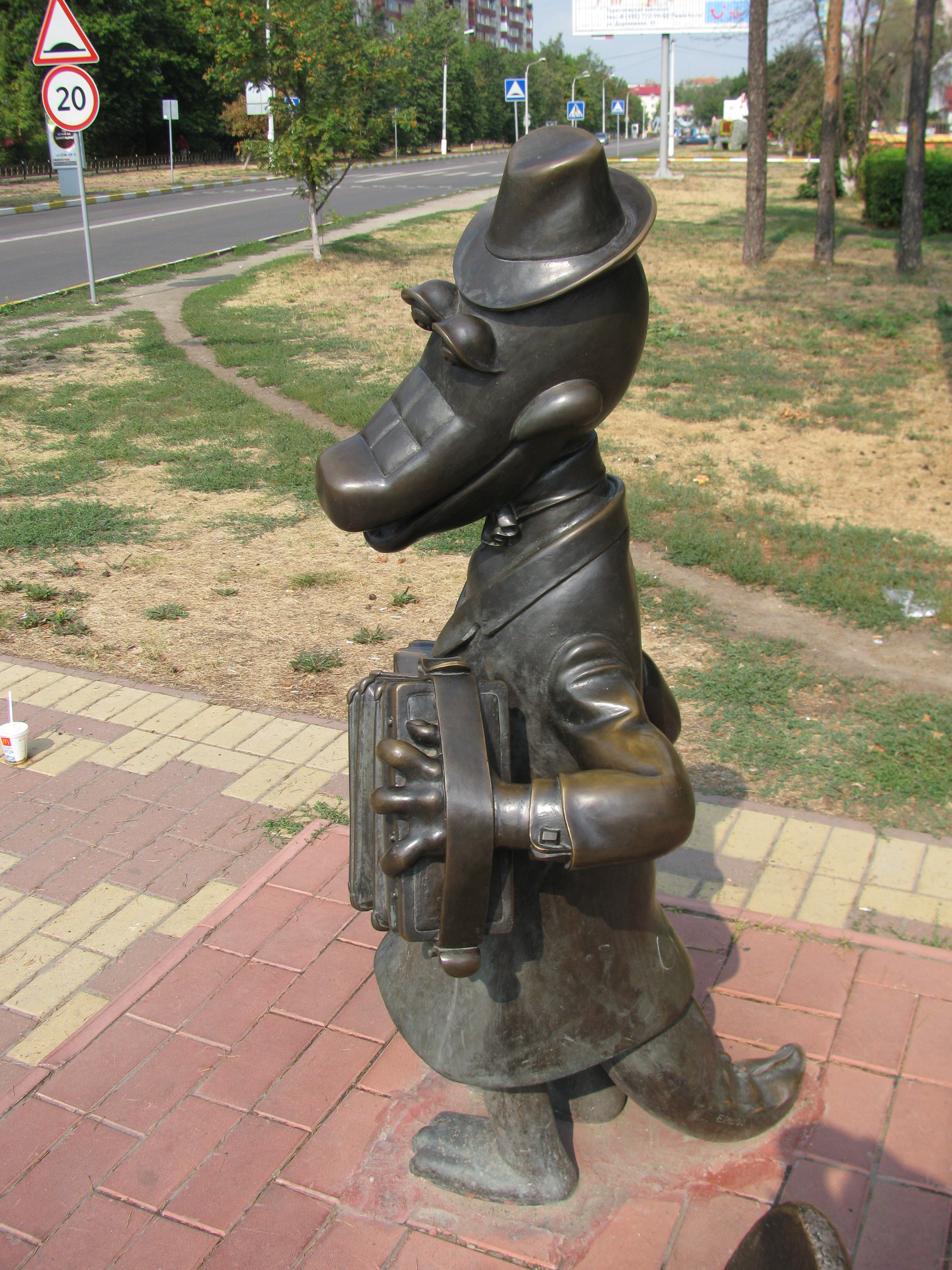
Monument to Gena the Crocodile and His Friends in Ramenskoye, Moscow Oblast.

The 50-year-old Gena works in a zoo as an attraction (or, as the original novel's author Uspensky had put it, "Gena the Crocodile worked in a zoo as a crocodile"). In his spare time, he plays the garmon and likes to sing. His two best-known songs are "Pust' begut neuklyuzhe..." and "Goluboy vagon" ("The Blue Train Car").

One rainy day, which happens to be his birthday, Gena sings the song: "Let the pedestrians run clumsily over puddles..." ("Пусть бегут неуклюже пешеходы по лужам..."), which contains the famous line: "Such a pity that one's birthday happens only once a year". This song, written by Vladimir Shainsky, has since become known as "Gena the Crocodile's Song". It continues to be extremely popular among Russophones of various ages and generations, and was also made popular in Finland by M. A. Numminen as "Minä soitan harmonikkaa" ("I Play the Accordion").

He is voiced by Vasily Livanov in the animated films.

The Mikoyan MiG-27 aircraft was given the nickname Крокодил Гена due to the distinctive shape of its nosecone.

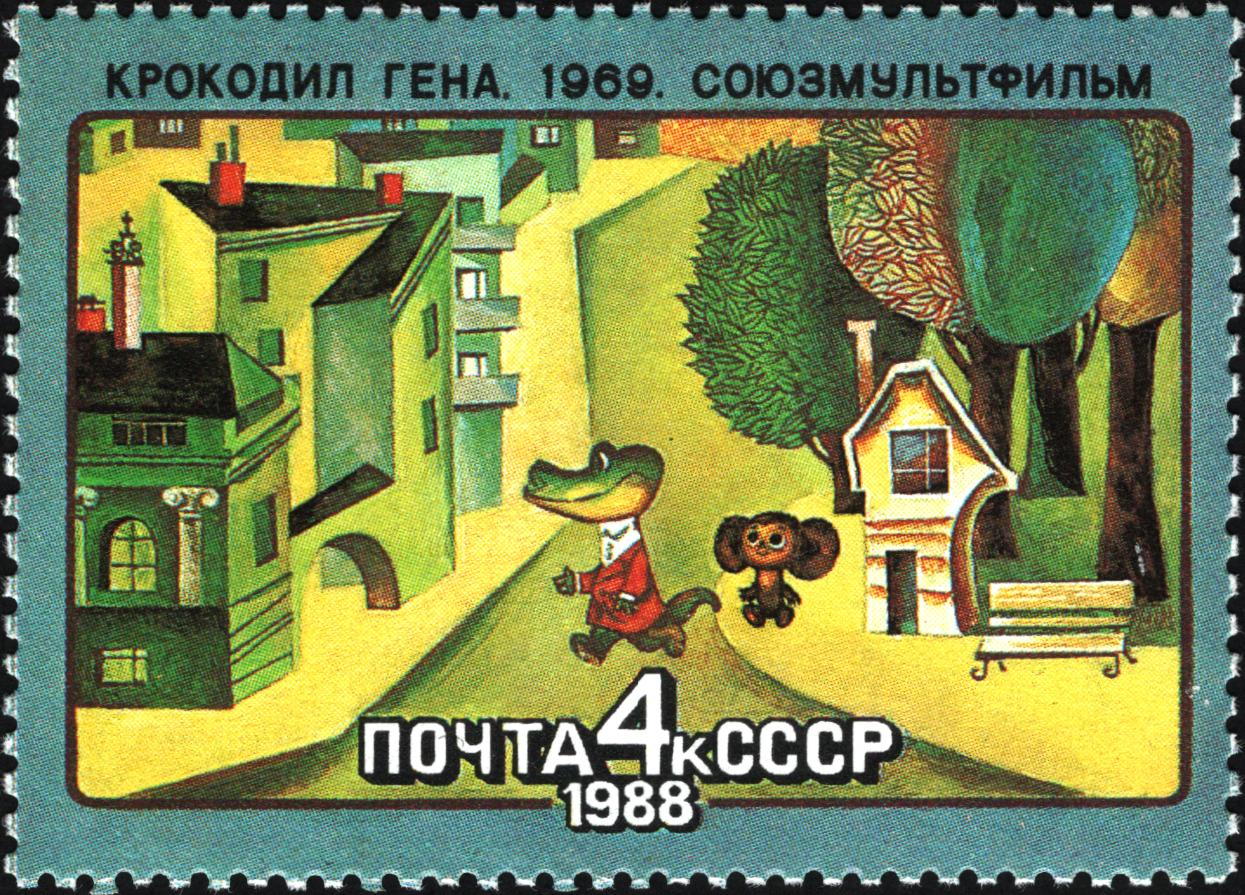
A Soviet postage stamp featuring the Gena the Crocodile animation.

== See also ==
- Cheburashka
- Shapoklyak
- Uncle Fyodor
