= Shapoklyak (film) =

- Russian: Шапокляк
- Directed by: Roman Kachanov
- Written by: Eduard Uspensky; Roman Kachanov
- Cinematography: Teodor Bunimovich; Aleksandr Zhukovskiy
- Edited by: Nadezhda Treshchyova
- Music by: Vladimir Shainsky
- Release date: 6 June 1974
- Running time: 19 min 48 sec
- Country: Soviet Union
- Language: Russian

Shapoklyak (Russian: Шапокляк, from French chapeau claque) is a 1974 Soviet Russian animated short film by Roman Kachanov.

== Synopsis ==
Gena the Crocodile and Cheburashka decide to go to the sea on vacation. Shapoklyak steals their train tickets, so they are kicked off the train. On their way home, the duo, with Shapoklyak's help, stops hikers from poaching and a factory from polluting a river.

Though the city Cheburashka and Gena live in is unnamed, it is implied to be Moscow. This is hinted when Cheburashka and Gena take the train from Moscow to Yalta and also when they have to walk home (they find a distance sign pointing to Moscow).

== Creators ==
- Scriptwriters: Eduard Uspensky, Roman Kachanov
- Director: Roman Kachanov
- Art director: Leonid Shvartsman
- Operators: Alexander Zhukovsky, Theodor Bunimovich
- Composer: Vladimir Shainsky
- Sound technician: Georgy Martynyuk
- Animators: Maya Buzinova, Natalya Dabizha, Yuri Norstein, Pavel Petrov, Boris Savin
- Editor: Natalya Abramova

== Cast ==
- Vasily Livanov as Gena the Crocodile
- Irina Mazing as Shapoklyak
- Klara Rumyanova as Cheburashka
- Vladimir Ferapontov as Gena (singing voice)

== Soundtrack ==
This film contains a famous Russian song called "Blue Train Car" (Голубой вагон) by the composer Vladimir Shainsky on Eduard Uspensky's verses. It is sung at the end of the film by Gena.
