= Cheburashka =

Russian character

Cheburashka Russian: Чебурашка
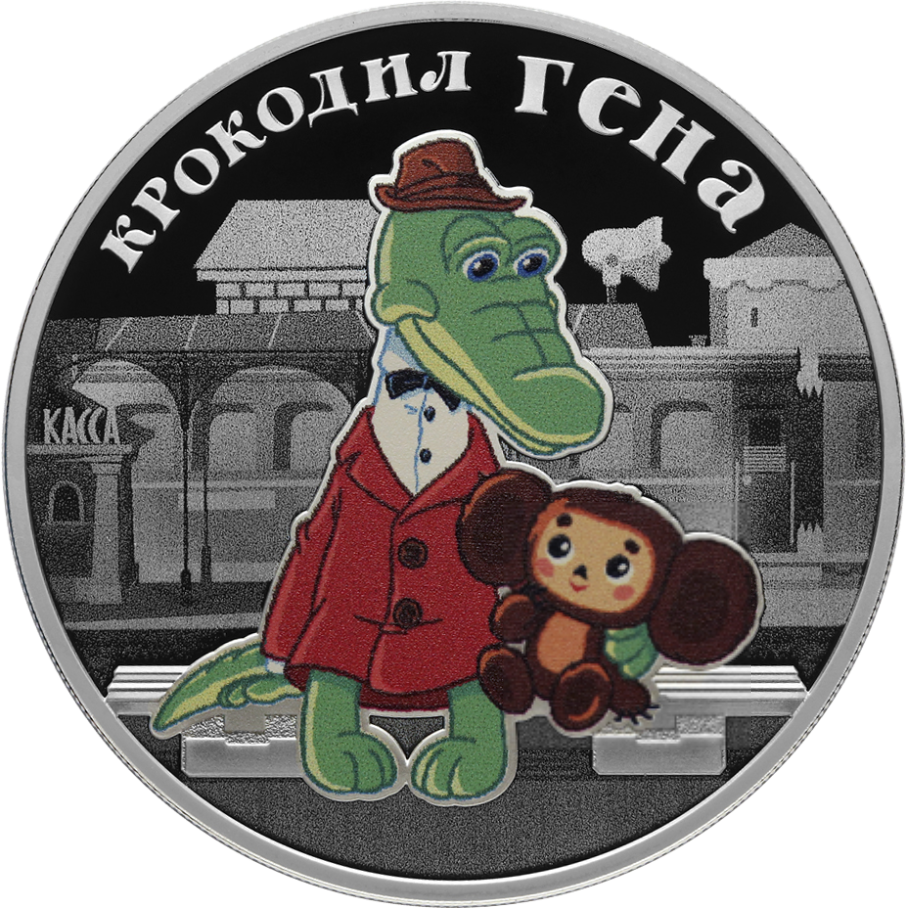
- A celebratory 3-ruble coin of Cheburashka and Gena the Crocodile, released in 2020.
- Created by: Eduard Uspensky
- Designed by: Eduard Uspensky; Roman Kachanov & his companions Makoto Nakamura; Dmitry Dyachenko & his equipes
- Voiced by: Klara Rumyanova (1969–1983); Nozomi Ohashi (2009–2010); Larisha Brokhman (2012–2018); Yelena Lomteva (2018–2019); Anzhelika Varum (2020); Olga Kuzmina (2023–present)

In-universe information
- Full name: Cheburashka
- Alias: Somikmovska
- Occupation: Himself; Pet; Pupil
- Family: Gena the Crocodile (his comrade)
- Nationality: Soviet Union → Russia

Cheburashka (Russian: Чебурашка, IPA: [t͡ɕɪbʊˈraʂkə]), also known as Topple in earlier English translations and Chebi in later English translations, is a fictional character created by Soviet writer Eduard Uspensky in his 1965 children's book Gena the Crocodile and His Friends. The character subsequently appeared as the protagonist in a series of stop-motion animated films directed by Roman Kachanov for Soyuzmultfilm, the first of which was made in 1969, with songs composed by Vladimir Shainsky.

Even today Cheburashka is still renowned in the former Soviet Union, and has been called the "Soviet Mickey Mouse" by external observers. Although only four short animated films have been produced featuring Cheburashka, he is still a national symbol in the former USSR and Russia, and is famous outside of it. One reason for his popularity is the message of his stories, which stress that one's origin is not as important as one's kindness.

A Russian live-action Cheburashka movie was released in 2023. A sequel, Cheburashka 2, came out in 2026.

== History ==
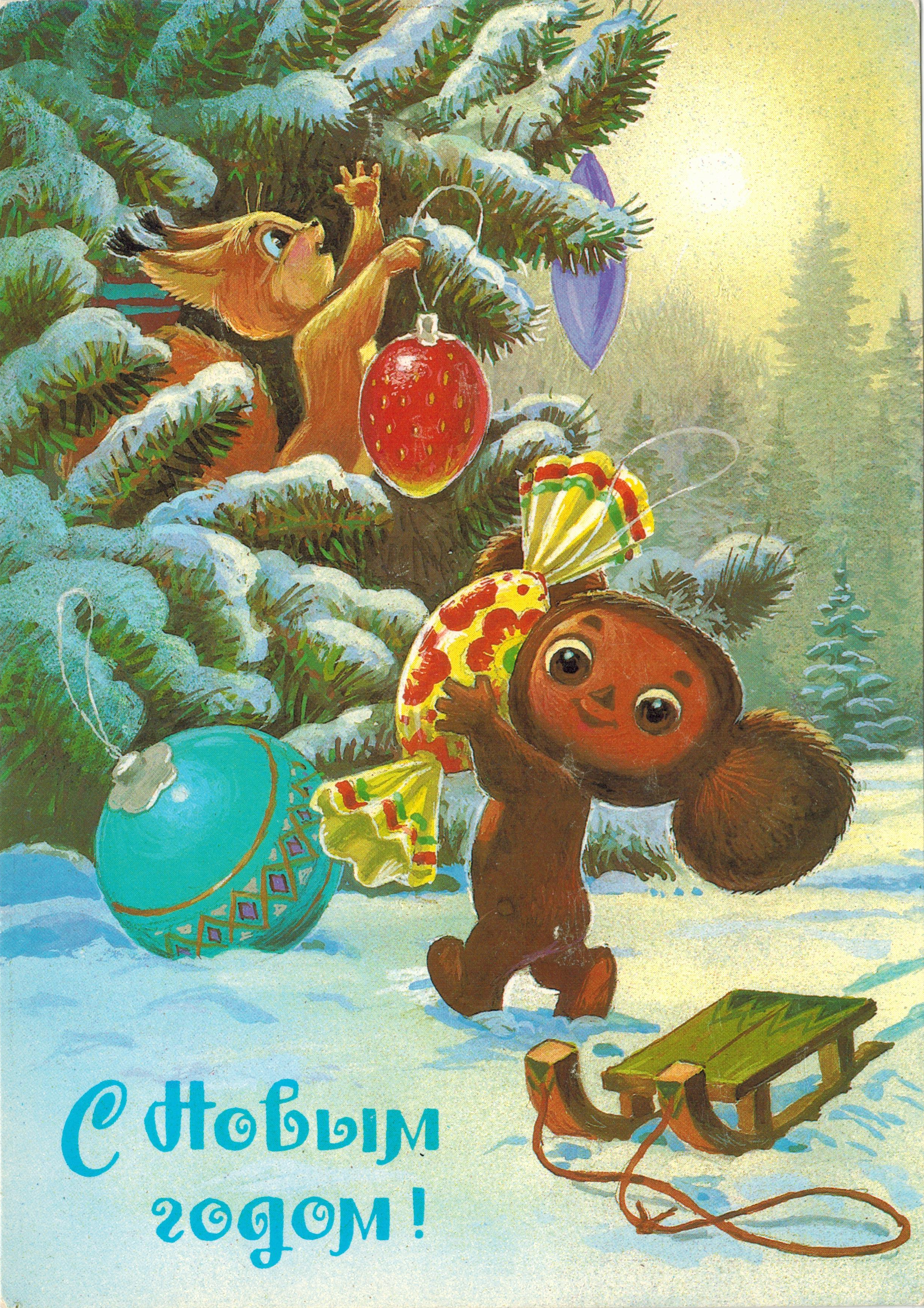
Soviet postcard "Happy New Year!" by artist Vladimir Zarubin, 1987.

Cheburashka is an iconic Russian cartoon-character who later became a popular figure in Russian jokes (along with his friend, Gena the Crocodile). According to the creator of the character, Eduard Uspensky, Cheburashka is an "animal unknown to science", with large monkey-like ears and a body resembling that of a cub, who lives in a tropical forest. He accidentally gets into a crate of oranges, eats his fill, and falls asleep. The crate is eventually delivered to a grocery store in an unnamed Russian city (hinted to be Moscow), where the rest of the main story unfolds.

The puzzled store manager finds the creature in the crate when he opens it; he takes him out and sits him on the table. The creature's paws are numb after staying in the crate for so long, and he tumbles down (чебурахнулся, cheburakhnulsya, a Russian colloquialism meaning "tumbled") from the table, onto the chair, and then onto the floor. This inspires the store manager to name him Cheburashka. Words with this root were archaic in Russian; Uspensky gave them a new lease on life. The Explanatory Dictionary of the Live Great Russian language (1882) of Vladimir Dahl gives the meaning of "cheburashka" as another name for the roly-poly toy.

Soviet censors tried to stifle the Cheburashka films, because they made fun of nitpicking bureaucrats, factory directors, and the Young Pioneers; Cheburashka and Gena could not join the Young Pioneers because they did not know how to start a Pioneers' bonfire and could not march. The phrase "only the best can be on the Pioneers" was added as a compromise.

In 2026, Cheburashka became a target of conservatives in Russia. Politician Andrey Makarov said that Cheburashka was "Jewish" in the months before the premiere of Cheburashka 2. Aleksandr Dugin called Cheburashka a "lunar demon" who had caused the downfall of the Soviet Union; Sergey Sosedov wrote in Pravda that the movie "teaches disrespect for elders". In hearings at the Duma, politicians called the film a "harmful cinema product that corrupts our children".

== Original series ==
1. Gena the Crocodile (1969)
2. Cheburashka (1971)
3. Shapoklyak (1974)
4. Cheburashka Goes to School (1983)

== Follow-ups ==
Cheburashka Arere? (チェブラーシカ あれれ?, "Cheburashka, huh?) was released by GoHands in Japan, 26 episodes, two-minute 2009–2010. Cheburashka was voiced by Nozomi Ōhashi, Gena by Hiroshi Tsuchida, Shapoklyak by Chō.

In 2007, the new animation, titled Cheburashka was announced by Ffango Entertoyment of South Korea and TV Tokyo Broadband and Frontier Works of Japan. Directed by Makoto Nakamura and written by Mikhail Aldashin and Michiru Shimada, the animation premiered on 8 December 2010 in Japan. It consisted of four shorts. One ("Hello Cheburashka") is a complete remake of the original Gena the Crocodile cartoon, while the three others ("Cheburashka and the Circus" and two episodes of "Shapoklyak's Consultation Center") have different stories.

The Russian-language compilation film of the Japanese remake shorts also titled Cheburashka premiered in Russia on 5 June 2014, but the distribution was temporarily revoked due to copyright dispute with Eduard Uspensky Later the distribution certificate was restored. The Russian titles of the episodes in it are «Чебурашка и цирк» (Cheburashka and the Circus), «Чебурашка идет в зоопарк» (Cheburashka Goes to the Zoo) и «Советы Шапокляк» (Advices of Shapoklyak).

A full-length film titled Cheburashka, directed by Dmitry Dyachenko, with Central Partnership and Yellow, Black and White producing, was released on 1 January 2023. Cheburashka is the highest-grossing film in the Russian box office history. Olga Kuzmina voiced Cheburashka, while Sergei Garmash portrayed Gena, a gardener (the film version of Crocodile Gena).

A full-length Russian comedy live-action animation Cheburashka 2 was released in 2026.

=== Drutten och Jena ===
Screenshot from "Drutten och Jena"

In the 1970s a number of children's television shows, radio shows, records and magazines were produced in Sweden with the characters Drutten and crocodile Jena (Gena). These two characters were based on a couple of Cheburashka and Gena dolls bought by Sten Carlberg on a trip to the Soviet Union, so they were visually identical to Cheburashka and Gena. "Drutten" means "one who has tumbled down", as one meaning of the Swedish colloquial verb "drutta" is "to fall or tumble down".

The animated series was broadcast by Sveriges Television, on the Sveriges magasin program. Sten Carlberg wrote completely new stories. In the TV series Drutten och Jena, also Drutten och Krokodilen, the two characters sang and told different stories from those in the USSR, lived on a bookshelf rather than in a city and are hand puppets operated in live action rather than stop motion. Only occasionally Swedish public service TV would broadcast a segment of the Russian original, dubbed in Swedish. While many Swedes may visually recognize Cheburashka, they will generally not associate these characters with the ones Russian children know. The first episode premiered in 1973. Around 600 to 700 episodes were shown in Sweden in total, in a series of many years. The last episode was screened as a special in 1988.

Drutten was voiced by Agneta Bolme Börjefors and Gena by Sten Carlberg. In Sweden, Drutten was perceived as a girl, while the original Cheburaska is a boy.

== Characters ==
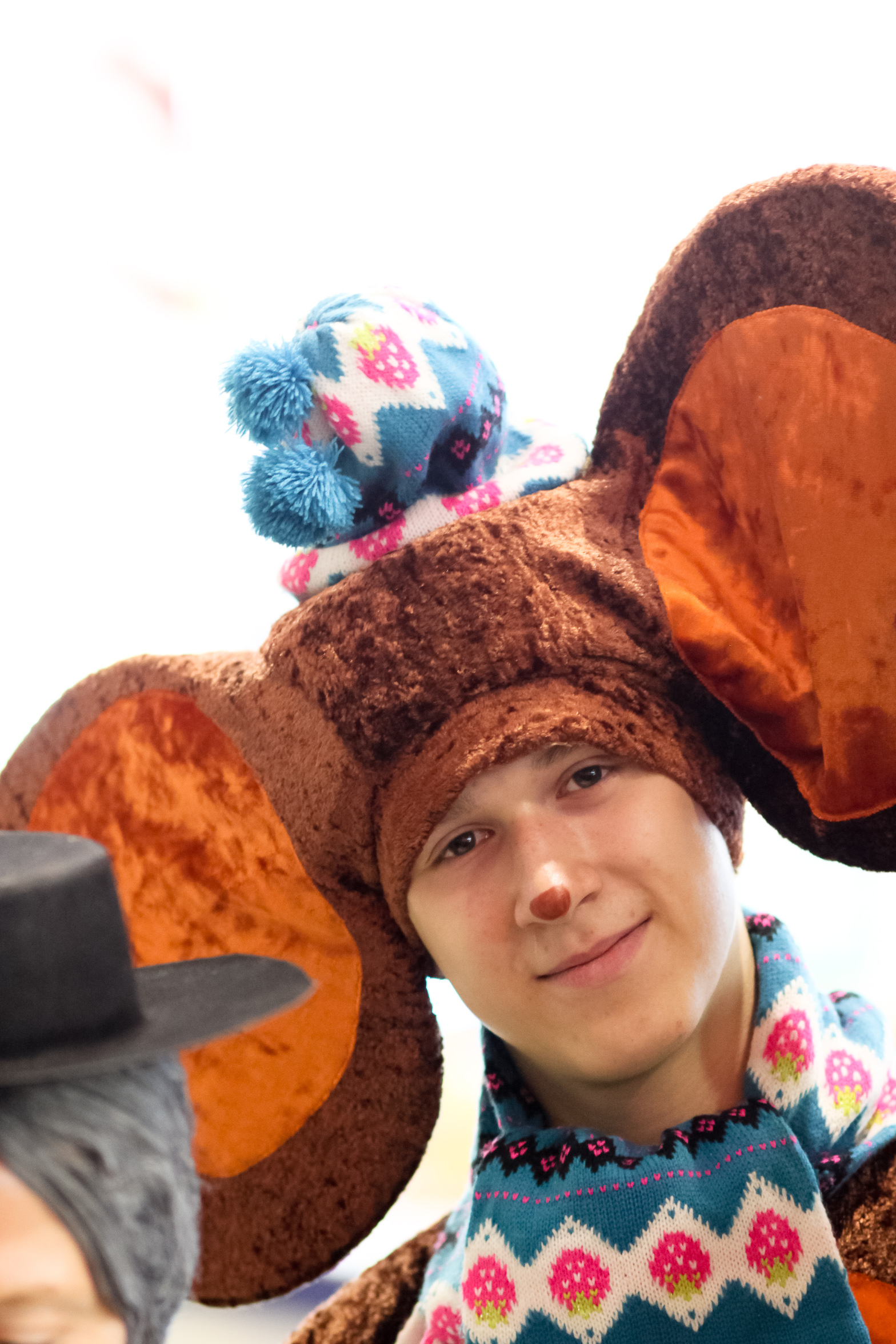
Cheburashka played by an actor

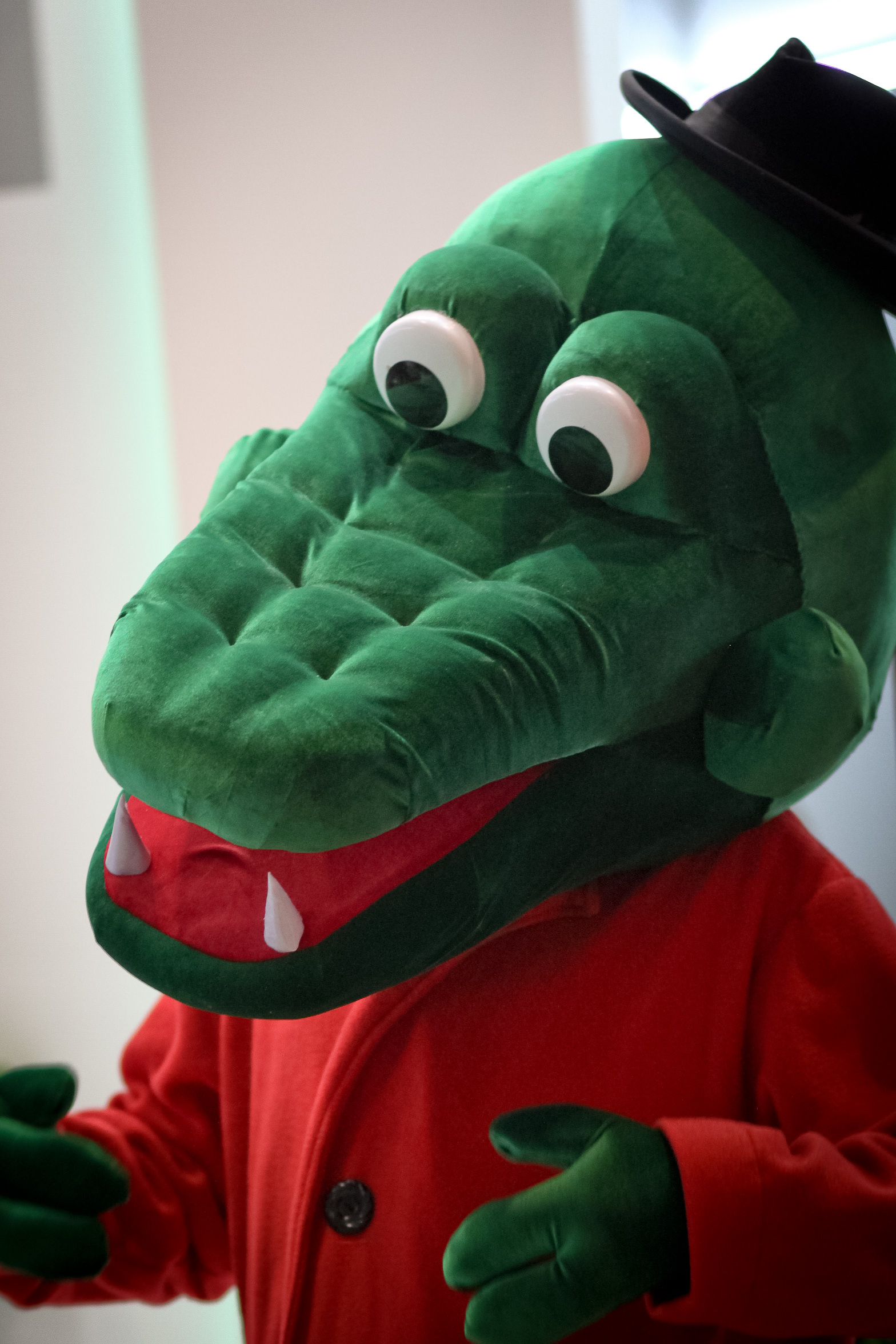
Gena the Crocodile played by an actor

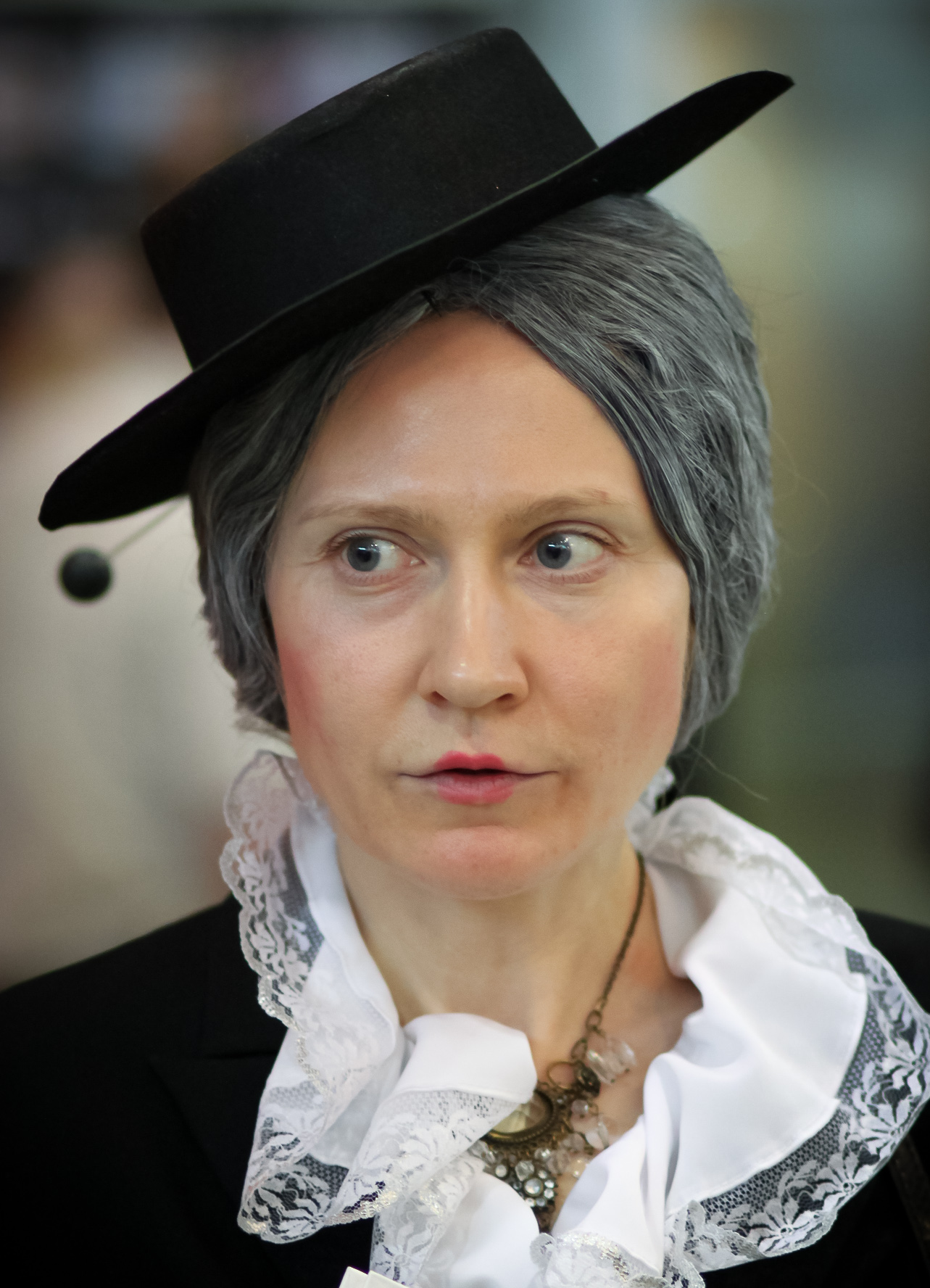
Old lady Shapoklyak played by an actress

=== Cheburashka and friends ===
Cheburashka is male, has a bear-like body, and is about the size of a 5-year-old child. He is a toddling creature with huge round ears on the side of his head that droop when he is discouraged. He has feet without legs, big black eyes, a snub nose. His voice is high-pitched and childlike. Cheburashka is an optimist as he only sees the best in people and is chirpy even in the gloomiest situation. Sergey Kapkov, animation historian and managing editor of Soyuzmultfilm, has said that Cheburashka "is absolutely useless and hopeless. He is like a stranger who doesn't understand a thing but just has one global idea, and that is to make friends and have others ... make friends with each other". For Leonid Katz, an art historian in Bar-Ilan University in Tel Aviv, Israel, Cheburashka represents the "ideal". As he notes: "In the film he is completely innocent. He represents all that was lost, all that was maybe impossible, all that was dreamed of".

After being turned down by the zoo as an "animal unknown to science", Cheburashka gets hired as a window display for a discount store selling factory seconds because he resembles one, residing in a phone booth. In the tale, he befriends an anthropomorphic crocodile named Gena, who wears a hat, a bow tie, and a coat, and plays the accordion. Gena works in a zoo as a zoo animal. Gena's favorite songs are "Such a Pity that One's Birthday Happens Only Once a Year(Пусть бегут неуклюже; Let them run awkwardly)" and "The Blue Train Car(Голубой вагон)", both of which are extremely popular with children.

=== Antagonist ===
Cheburashka and Gena have their adventures made more difficult by a character named "Старуха Шапокляк" ("Old Lady Shapoklyak"), a mischievous, yet charming, old lady. Shapoklyak is tall and thin, wears a chapeau claque hat and a dark-coloured dress, and carries around a pet rat, Lariska, in her purse to help her play pranks on people, though near the end of some stories she turns around and helps the protagonists. The refrain of her theme song contains her motto, "One won't ever get famous for good deeds" Russian: Хорошими делами прославиться нельзя.

== Copyright issues and status ==
Cheburashka in 1965, in the first edition of the book.

The rights to the Cheburashka character and image have been heavily debated in court. In 1994, Eduard Uspensky (the writer) copyrighted the character's name and image and proceeded to sell the rights to various countries. Leonid Shvartsman, the art director of the animated films, has tried to prove in court that he was the creator of Cheburashka's visual appearance and that this copyright should be separate from the rights for the literary character. On 13 March 2007, Shvartsman and his lawyer lost a 4.7 million ruble lawsuit against BRK Cosmetics and Eduard Uspensky. Shvartsman alleged that Uspensky illegally sold the rights to the Cheburashka image (which was allegedly not his to sell) to BRK Cosmetics, which used it on toothpaste packaging. The defence argued that the artist who drew the character for the toothpaste had never seen the animated films and had created the character himself after the impressions left from reading Uspensky's books. Shvartsman argued that the character on the packets was allegedly an exact copy of the one in the animated films.

Uspensky died in 2018, meaning that the copyright for the Cheburashka character will last until 31 December 2088 (see Copyright law of the Russian Federation).

== Cheburashka in culture ==
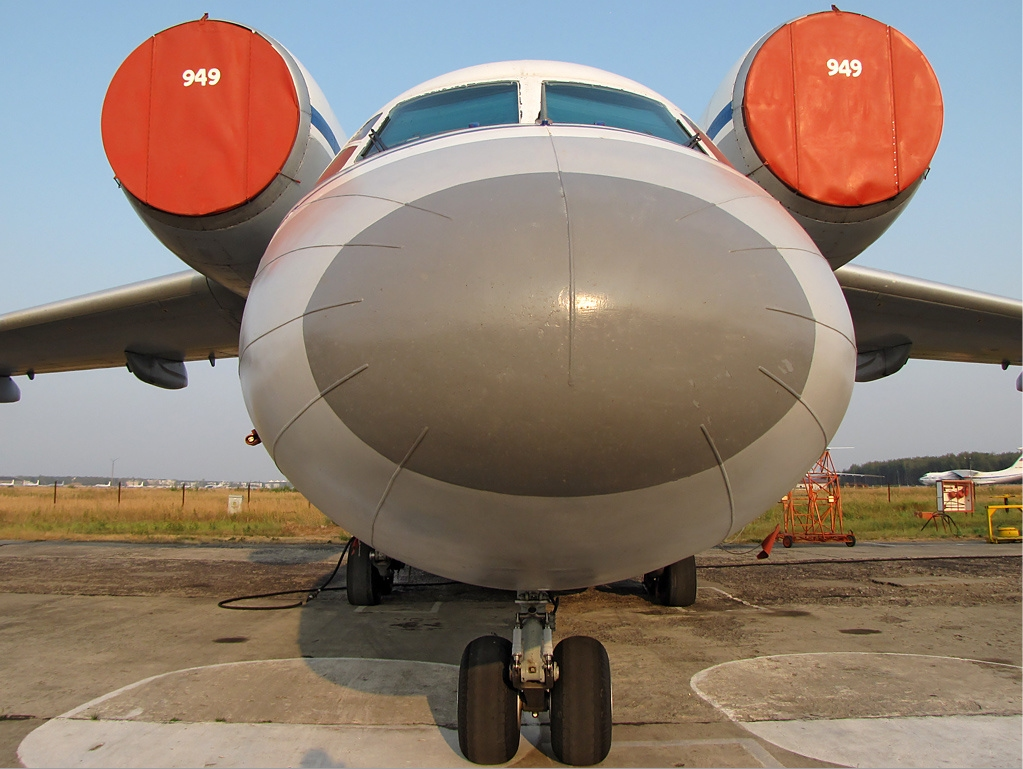
The Antonov An-72 is said to resemble Cheburashka when viewed from the front.

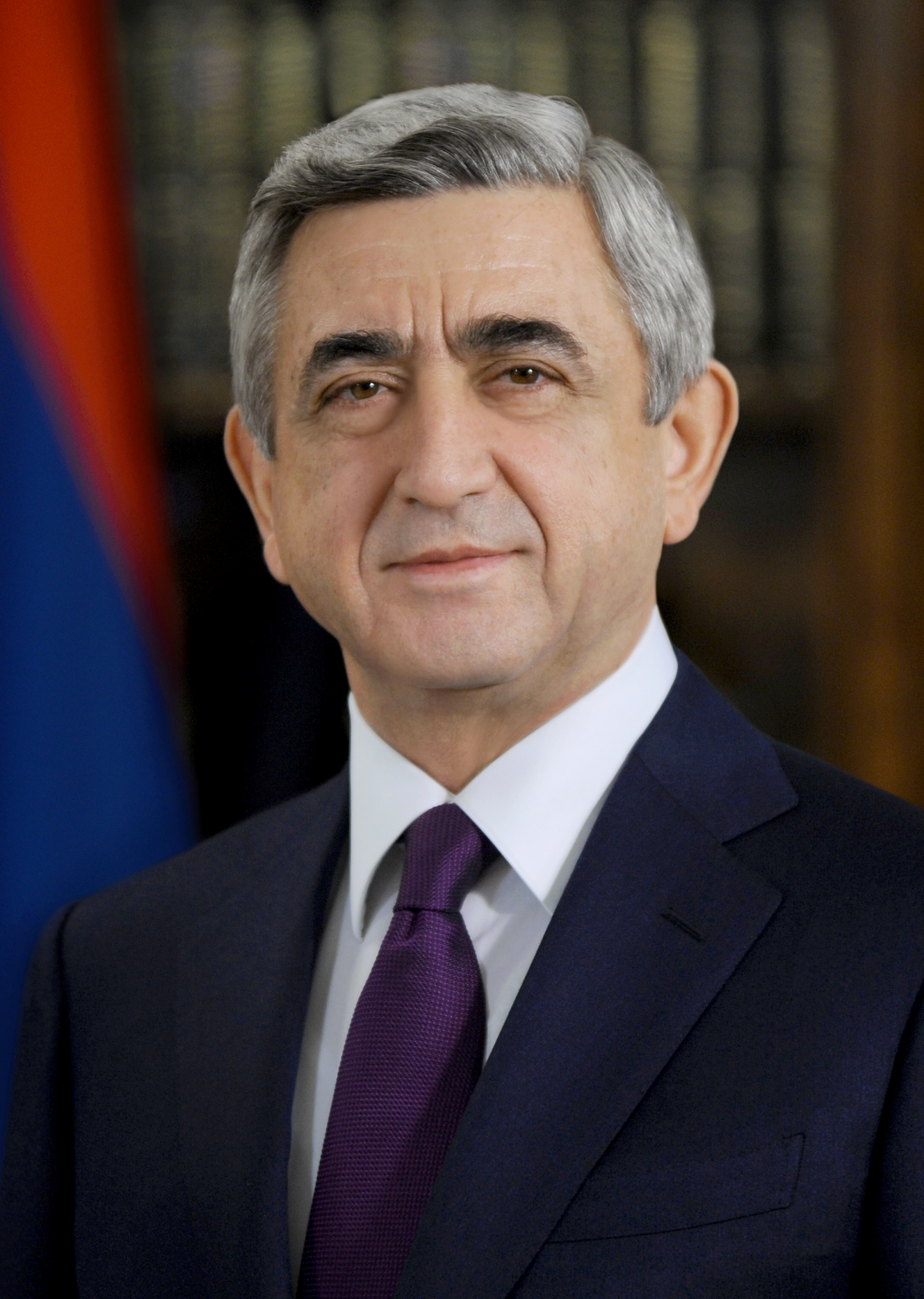
Serzh Sargsyan’s appearance has been satirically compared to Cheburashka

Cheburashka is now a staple of Russian cartoons, and there are several licensed products on the market, such as children's joke books and stuffed toys. He is also one of the few Russian animation characters to be the subject of numerous Russian jokes and riddles. The popularity of Cheburashka grew a lot after it became an animated film.

The word "Cheburashka" is also used in a figurative sense to name objects that somehow resemble the creature (such as an An-72 aircraft which, when seen from the front, resembles the character's head) or are just as pleasing as it is (e.g. a colloquial name for a small bottle of lemonade – from the brand name "Cheburashka"). There is also a rocket launcher called Cheburashka, used during the Russo-Ukrainian war.

In the 1990 satirical claymation film Grey Wolf and Little Red Riding Hood, produced by Garri Bardin, Grey Wolf eats Gena and Cheburashka, along with other fantasy characters.

Cheburashka was chosen as the official mascot with the main mascots for the Russian Olympic Team in the following games:

- 2004 Summer Olympics in Greece
- 2006 Winter Olympics in Turin, Italy (with white fur)
- 2008 Summer Olympics in Beijing, China (with red fur)
- 2010 Winter Olympics in Vancouver, Canada (with blue fur)

Cheburashka also became known in some countries outside the former Soviet Union (and of the Soviet Bloc). He became very popular in Japan after an animated film series about him was shown in 15 cinemas all over Japan and was watched by about 700,000 between summer 2001 and spring 2002. In 2008, the Cheburashka films (as part of the "Ghibli Museum Library") were made available to Japanese cinemas on the same date as Hayao Miyazaki's Ponyo on the Cliff by the Sea. An English-dubbed edition of the first 3 animated films was released in 1987, titled The Adventures of Charlie and Cubby.

During the 2018 Armenian protests Cheburashka was used by many protesters as a symbol to mock Serzh Sargsyan due to the similarity of their appearances. Among others, during a protest, a protester masqueraded as Cheburashka urged Sargsyan to resign, while another one lit his on fire.
