= Cheburashka (1971 film) =

1971 animated film directed by Roman Kachanov

- Russian: Чебурашка
- Directed by: Roman Kachanov
- Written by: Eduard Uspensky; Roman Kachanov
- Starring: Klara Rumyanova; Vasily Livanov
- Cinematography: Teodor Bunimovich
- Music by: Vladimir Shainsky
- Release date: June 6, 1971
- Running time: 20 min 6 sec
- Country: Soviet Union
- Language: Russian

Cheburashka (Russian: Чебурашка) is a 1971 Soviet animated film directed by Roman Kachanov.

== Plot ==
Cheburashka wishes Gena the Crocodile a happy birthday and gives him a toy helicopter as a gift. When they launch the helicopter, Cheburashka accidentally holds onto it and is carried a great distance. Later, they encounter a group of pioneers and express their desire to join the organization. Initially, the pioneers suggest that they stay in the pet corner, but Gena and Cheburashka insist on becoming full members.

After some discussion, it becomes apparent that neither Gena nor Cheburashka knows how to build birdhouses, start campfires, or march. The pioneers decide not to accept them right away and suggest they learn these skills first. Gena and Cheburashka try to build a birdhouse without success, but they manage to build a playground for local children and help the pioneers collect scrap metal. In gratitude, the pioneers finally accept Gena and Cheburashka into their group and teach them how to march.

== Creators ==
- Director: Roman Kachanov
- Scriptwriters: Eduard Uspensky, Roman Kachanov
- Artist: Leonid Shvartsman
- Operator: Theodor Bunimovich, Vladimir Sidorov
- Composer: Vladimir Shainsky
- Sound technician: Georgy Martynyuk
- Animators: Yuri Norstein, Maya Buzinova, Natalya Dabizha

== Cast ==
- Klara Rumyanova as Cheburashka
- Vasily Livanov as Gena the Crocodile
- Vladimir Ferapontov as Gena (singing voice)
- Tamara Dmitrieva as Pioneers

== Soundtrack ==
This film opens with a song called "Let Them Run Clumsily" (Пусть бегут неуклюже) of Vladimir Shainsky on Alexander Timofeevsky's words.
