= Vladimir Shainsky =

Russian composer (1925–2017)

- Владимир Шаинский
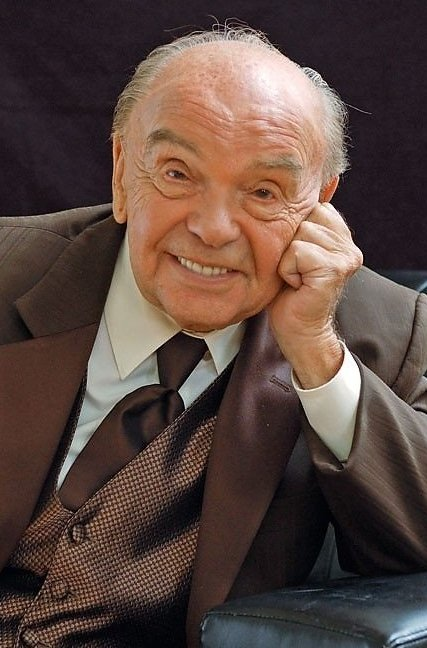
- Born: 12 December 1925; Kiev, Soviet Union
- Died: 25 December 2017 (aged 92); San Diego, California, U.S.
- Occupation: Composer
- Years active: 1949–2013
- Title: People's Artist of the RSFSR (1986)
- Awards: Order "For Merit to the Fatherland" (4th class, 2005); Order of Honour (2001); Order of Friendship (1995); USSR State Prize (1981)

Vladimir Yakovlevich Shainsky (Russian: Владимир Яковлевич Шаинский, [vlɐˈdʲimʲɪr ʂɐˈinskʲɪj]; 12 December 1925 – 25 December 2017) was a Soviet and Russian composer. He was a recipient of the People's Artist of the RSFSR (1986).

== Biography ==
Shainsky was born in Kiev to a Jewish family. He first studied violin at the music school in Kiev. His studies there were interrupted in 1941 by World War II, when his family was evacuated to Tashkent in the Uzbek SSR. He continued his musical education at the Tashkent Conservatory, until he was enlisted in the Red Army. After the war he entered Moscow Conservatory, where he graduated as a violinist. In the 1950s, Shainsky played in Leonid Utyosov's orchestra, taught students, and worked as a music manager at various dance orchestras. He later studied composition at the Baku Conservatory. His first compositional works were a string quartet, created in 1963 during his studies at the Baku Conservatory, and a symphony, written in 1965.

During his career as a composer, Shainsky wrote a large number of works for children. He created music and songs for cartoons such as Cheburashka, Katerok, Mamontenok and Kroshka Enot; also for films including Breakfast on the Grass, Aniskin and Fantomas, Aniskin Again, School Waltz, Finist, the Brave Falcon; and for musicals. He wrote many songs, such as A Soldier is Walking in the Town, Russia's Little Corner, White Birch, Smile, Clouds, A Dog is Lost, Crocodile Gena's Song, and True thrushes. Shainsky also authored numerous songs in the Yiddish language, which are still popular with klezmer orchestras. Shainsky received numerous awards, including the USSR State Prize (1981), People's Artist of the RSFSR (1986), and the Order of Friendship (1996). He was a multiple-time prizewinner of the Song of the Year festival (since 1971) multiple times, and was a member of the political party United Russia.

Shainskay was married three times—first to composer Asya Sultanova; second to Natalya Vasilievna Shainskaya, with whom he had a son; and third to Svetlana Vladimirovna Shainskaya, with whom he had a son and a daughter.

Shainsky was ill with stomach cancer and underwent several operations. He died on 25 December 2017 in San Diego, at the age of 92, after suffering a long illness.
