= Boris Dyozhkin =

Russian animator (1914–1992)

- Born: Boris Petrovich Dyozhkin; August 19, 1914; Kursk, Kursk Governorate, Russian Empire
- Died: March 13, 1992 (aged 77); Moscow, Russia
- Occupations: Animator, artist, educator
- Years active: 1934–1984
- Spouse(s): Faina Yepifanova; Olga Gaiduk-Dyozhkina
- Children: Sergei Dyozhkin

Boris Petrovich Dyozhkin (Russian: Борис Петрович Дёжкин; 19 August [O.S. 6 August] 1914 – 13 March 1992) was a Soviet animator, animation and art director, as well as a caricaturist, book illustrator and educator at Soyuzmultfilm. He was a member of ASIFA, and was named Honoured Worker of the Arts Industry of the RSFSR in 1969.

== Early years ==
Dyozhkin was born in Kursk into a Russian working-class family. His father was a railwayman who was later transferred to Moscow. Boris started his career as a locksmith at a Moscow factory. Simultaneously he learned to draw caricatures and finished training courses organized by the Krokodil magazine and led by Alexei Radakov.

In 1934 he also finished animation courses at the Moscow Printing House. Same year he joined the Experimental Animation Workshop under the Main Directorate of the Photo-Cinematographic Industry along with Alexei Radakov, Vladimir Suteev and Pyotr Nosov. Headed by Viktor Smirnov, a former official at the New York-based Amkino Corporation responsible for distribution of Soviet movies in North America, it focused on developing animation style inspired by both Disney and Fleischer Studios. While their cartoons were practically unknown in the Soviet Union, they were highly regarded by authorities, including Joseph Stalin.

== Soyuzmultfilm ==
We Are Also Here for the Olympics! (1940) dir. Vladimir Suteev, art director and assistant director Boris Dyozhkin

In 1936 the collective was merged with several other Moscow workshops into the Soyuzdetmultfilm Studio (renamed to Soyuzmultfilm in a year). Dyozhkin found himself working along with Ivan Ivanov-Vano, Aleksandr Ivanov, Leonid Amalrik, the Brumberg sisters and other prominent animators. All of them continued developing the so-called Disney style, which resulted in a line of traditionally animated shorts.

Dyozhkin quickly gained the reputation of one of the most skillful animators. Unlike some other colleagues who didn't want to copy the American way of filmmaking, he adored Walt Disney and redrew his films frame by frame in order to study all techniques. He learned to synchronize picture and sound, to follow the rhythm, which made him one of the most wanted animators at the studio. As a result, he himself managed to co-direct only one short Hail to the Heroes! (1937) before the Great Patriotic War.

With the start of war during the summer of 1941 Moscow survived heavy bombing by the Nazi aviation. One of the bombs hit the house of the fellow animator Roman Davydov where Dyozhkin and his wife Faina Yepifanova, also an animator, were staying at the time. Dyozhkin covered the wife with his body and was hit with a shell fragment. As a result, he lost his left eye to his great horror, since he had already experienced a vision loss by that time. He wore an eyepatch for the rest of his life.

== After the war ==
Nevertheless, Dyozhkin worked at Soyuzmultfilm for the next 40 years, often combining responsibilities of director, art director and animator, developing characters and pre-recorded soundtrack in order to synchronize it with movements. By 1955 he made himself a name with a popular line of short comedy films usually centered around two teams that competed in various sport disciplines such as football, hockey, skiing, boxing, etc. They contained few spoken lines and were based on fast-paced slapstick.

The only feature film he ever directed — Cipollino (1961), an adaptation of the Italian fairy tale of the same name, — was also made in the same distinctive manner. The score was written by the acclaimed Soviet composer Karen Khachaturian who later reused it for his Cipollino ballet performed in the Bolshoi Theatre up to this day.

After 1984 Dyozhkin stopped receiving offers from Soyuzmultfilm. He gained money by illustrating books and postal cards, although he continued writing screenplays and offering them to studio executives without much result. This undermined his health, and by the end of 1991 he became seriously ill.

Dyozhkin died in 1992 aged 77 and was buried at the Vagankovo Cemetery in Moscow. He was survived by the second wife Olga Gaiduk-Dyozhkina and his son from the first marriage Sergei Dyozhkin (27 December 1939 — 5 January 2000), also a prolific Russian animator.

== Selected filmography ==
- 1936 — Kolobok (animator)
- 1937 — Hail to the Heroes! (co-director, art director)
- 1938 — Why Is Rhino's Skin Wrinkly? (animator)
- 1939 — Uncle Styopa (animator)
- 1939 — Moydodyr (animator)
- 1939 — Limpopo (animator)
- 1940 — We Are Also Here for the Olympics! (art director, assistant director)
- 1943 — The Tale of Tsar Saltan (animator)
- 1944 — Blue Tit (art director)
- 1945 — The Lost Letter (animator)
- 1946 — Quite Glade (co-director, animator)
- 1947 — The Humpbacked Horse (animator)
- 1948 — The Elephant and the Ant (director, animator)
- 1948 — Fedya Zaitcev (animator)
- 1951 — The Night Before Christmas (animator)
- 1951 — The Brave Man's Heart (director)
- 1952 — The Scarlet Flower (animator)
- 1953 — Naughty Kitten (art director)
- 1955 — Incredible Match (co-director, animator)
- 1956 — Familiar Faces (co-director, screenwriter, art director, animator)
- 1957 — Hail to Friends! (co-director, screenwriter, art director, animator)
- 1957 — Miracle Maker (animator)
- 1958 — Petya and the Little Red Riding Hood (animator)
- 1961 — Cipollino (director, art director, animator)
- 1963 — Snowy Roads (director, screenwriter, art director, animator)
- 1964 — Puck! Puck! (director, screenwriter, art director, animator)
- 1966 — This is Not About Me (director, animator)
- 1968 — Return Match (director, screenwriter, animator)
- 1970 — Meteor at the Boxing Ring (director, screenwriter, art director, animator)
- 1974—1982 — Fitil (director, 6 episodes)
- 1974 — Football Stars (director, screenwriter, art director, animator)
- 1978 — Talent and Fans (director, art director, animator)
- 1981 — Come to the Skating Rink (director, screenwriter, art director)

== Awards ==
- 1949 — 10th Venice International Film Festival award for The Elephant and the Ant
- 1953 — 14th Venice International Film Festival diploma for The Brave Man's Heart
- 1955 — first prize at the VII Venice International Film Festival for Children and Youth for Incredible Match
- 1956 — silver medal at the I International Film Festival in Damascus for Incredible Match
- 1958 — second award at the I All-Union Film Festival in Moscow for Hail to Friends!
- 1966 — second award at the II All-Union Film Festival in Kiev for Puck! Puck!

== See also ==
- History of Russian animation
