= Losharik =

Soviet animated film

- Film poster
- Directed by: Ivan Ufimtsev
- Written by: Gennady Tsyferov; Genrikh Sapgir
- Starring: Rina Zelyonaya (voice)
- Music by: Viktor Kuprevich
- Animation by: Yuri Norstein
- Distributed by: Soyuzmultfilm
- Release date: 1971
- Running time: 10 minutes 18 seconds
- Country: Soviet Union
- Language: Russian

Losharik (Russian: Лошарик) is a 1971 Soviet animated film. It was directed by Ivan Ufimtsev, with the screenplay by Gennady Tsyferov and Genrikh Sapgir.

Losharik tells the story of a circus animal composed of brightly coloured juggling balls, created as a juggler wishes that he was a lion tamer. The name of the character, and thus the title of the film, is a portmanteau of the Russian words for horse, "loshad" and small ball, "sharik" . Though friendly, Losharik is dismissed by the other circus animals for not being real. Dejected, Losharik gives away the balls that make up his form to children. When the children attend the circus, they demand the return of Losharik, giving back the balls which reform Losharik. The film was a favourite of both adults and children, though Ufimtsev claimed to be disappointed that he could not "fully realize his plan". For the production, art director Tamara Poletika and animator Yuri Norstein visited circus rehearsals for inspiration. The finished film, released by Soyuzmultfilm in 1971, has since been analysed for its themes, particularly in the context of Soviet culture. Two children's books have appeared using the character of Losharik, and the name became a nickname for a submarine of the Russian Navy which, like the animated character, used connected spheres in its construction.

== Plot ==
A juggler in a circus dreams of one day becoming a lion tamer. As he juggles, the wooden juggling balls come together to form a live three-legged horse-like creature, which introduces itself as "Losharik", a portmanteau of the Russian words for horse, "loshad" (Russian: лошадь) and small ball, "sharik" (Russian: шарик). The good-natured animal plays with the juggler. Seeing this, the ringmaster offers the juggler a chance to appear as a lion tamer, with the circus's lion and tiger. When the lion and tiger see Losharik, they dismiss him as not being a real animal. The disheartened Losharik leaves the circus and disassembles itself, giving the balls that make up its form to children.

The juggler, now the circus's lion tamer, appears in the ring and performs the routine with the lion and tiger. The children in the audience start to call for Losharik. Confused, the circus staff point out that Losharik is not a real animal, but the children cry that Losharik is kind, and therefore the most real of all. The lion and tiger leave, and the children throw the balls they had received into the ring, reassembling Losharik. Losharik and the juggler reunite, to the delight of the audience.

== Production ==
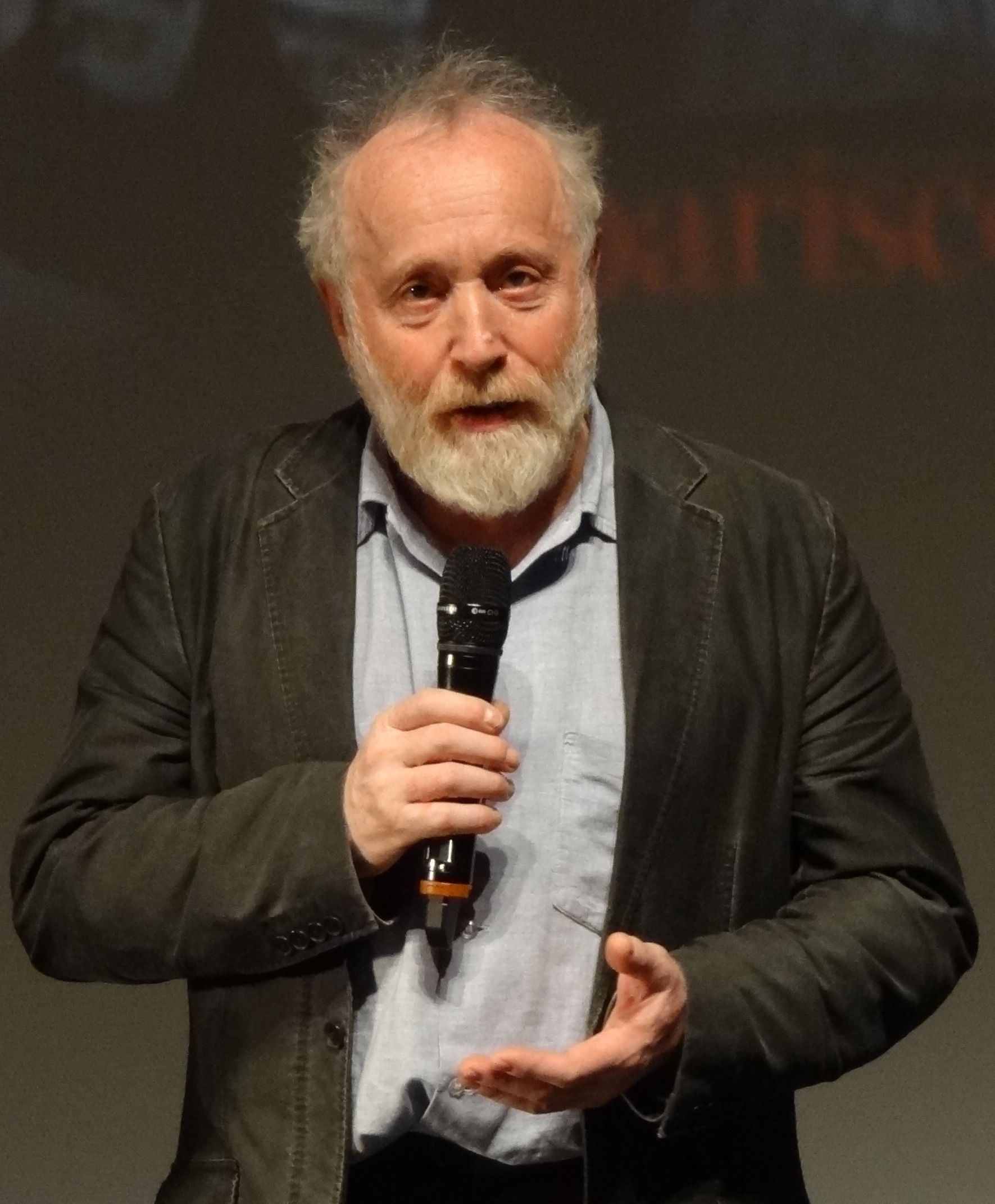
Yuri Norstein was the animator for the film

The film, with a run time of 10 minutes and 18 seconds, was made by Soyuzmultfilm and directed by Ivan Ufimtsev, an actor who had studied under Aleksey Dmitrievich Popov, and who had made his career in animation. Losharik was an early collaboration with illustrator Tamara Poletika, with whom he worked on a number of films between 1971 and 1976. The choice of subject involving toys and games was a common theme of Soviet children's animation, and its mainstay between the 1950s and 1980s. Earlier examples involving toys imbued with their own life included Mstislav Pashchenko's 1950 film When the Christmas Trees are Lit, and Leonid Amalrik and Vladimir Polkovnikov's 1953 film The Big Shop. The co-author of the screenplay, Genrikh Sapgir, had also translated the poems of Soviet Jewish poet Ovsei Driz, one of which was animated in 1968 as Ball of Wool by director Nikolay Serebryakov, depicting an elderly woman who finds a magic ball of wool in a snowstorm, and knits a world that takes on its own life.

The screenplay was by Gennady Tsyferov and Genrikh Sapgir, with Tamara Poletika as the art director, and Yuri Norstein as the animator. The score was composed by Viktor Kuprevich, while Rina Zelyonaya provided the voice of Losharik. For accuracy in the depiction of circus life, Poletika and Norstein visited a circus and observed its rehearsals. Poletika would later recall that she asked in the studio if anyone wanted to attend them with her, and only Norstein agreed to. Details such as the acrobat's routine, and the stage curtains in the circus, would be used in the animated film. According to Poletika, the suggestion for Losharik having three legs rather than four came from the prominent art director Lev Milchin, and that the Tretyakov Gallery in Moscow had asked for two of the film's preliminary sketches. Despite being popular with both children and adults, and described as "a poignant story about a dream, striving for perfection, and betrayal" Ufimtsev "claimed that he could not fully realize his plan, and the result upset him."

== Themes ==
Cultural historian David MacFadyen observes that the film addresses a number of themes prominent in Soviet society. The formation of Losharik from the individual wooden juggling balls represents the coming together of small parts into a 'social' whole. This harmonious creation is disrupted by the criticism of the lion and tiger in the film, resulting in Losharik's dissolution. The creature is restored when the children, acknowledging its kindness and sacrifice, express their demands for its return. Losharik is formed, disassembled, and reformed "by literal surrender to the world's social emotions." The film emphasises "affective variety and multiplicity", making use of crosscuts to "show fragmented events or a diversity of characters". The juggler's dreams of being a lion tamer are depicted with two dimensional cutouts, differentiating it from the 'real world', depicted with three dimensional puppets. Camera angles are used to demonstrate different points of view, such as a low angle as when the juggler is shown "finally understanding his animal's increasingly humble sense of reality." The lion and tiger in the film are expressions of a "dogmatic body moulding the world", contrasting with Losharik, an "ideologically open, shifting body".

== Legacy ==
Genrikh Sapgir, co-author of the screenplay, wrote a poem, also called "Losharik", published in 1974. It tells a similar story of a circus animal made up of coloured juggling balls. The character also appeared in Gennady Tsyferov's children's book Losharik and Other Fairy Tales (Russian: Лошарик и другие сказки), published in 2014. The creation of the name Losharik as a portmanteau appeared in a similar form with the 2003 animated series Smeshariki (Russian: Смешарики), released in English as Kikoriki. This combined the Russian word smeshnye, meaning "funny", with shariki, as with Losharik, meaning small balls. This referred to the design of the characters, which depicted animals as rounded balls. Losharik became the nickname of the Project 210 submarine built by Sevmash between 1988 and 2003, the name referring to the unique design of its pressure hull, consisting of seven interconnected spheres.
