= Soyuzmultfilm =

Russian animation studio

JSC Studio Soyuzmultfilm
- Logo used since 2023
- Native name: АО Киностудия Союзмультфильм
- Formerly: Studio Soyuzmultfilm (1936-2021)
- Type: Joint-stock company
- Industry: Animation
- Founded: 10 June 1936; 90 years ago
- Headquarters: 21, bld.1, Akademika Korolyova str., Moscow, Russia,127427
- Key people: Yuliana Slashcheva (Chairman); Boris Mashkovtsev (Director)
- Products: Animated films Television series
- Revenue: $2.76 million (2017)
- Operating income: −$8.58 million (2017)
- Net income: $12,906 (2017)
- Total assets: $15.4 million (2017)
- Total equity: $168,401 (2017)
- Owner: Federal Agency for State Property Management
- Number of employees: 125 (February 2020)
- Divisions: Christmas Films

External videos
- 【Creating ‘Mr. Theo, Cat & Dog’ and ‘Orange Moo-Cow’】 on YouTube Channel - English Subtittles
- Legendary Russian animation studio Soyuzmultfilm (@Мультики студии Союзмультфильм).Watch as the convertible creator laptop, ideal for demanding 2D and 3D work thanks to its Wacom® EMR pen and outstanding color accuracy, helps the studio to remain the innovative beacon of creativity known throughout the world. on YouTube

Soyuzmultfilm (Russian: Союзмультфи́льм, IPA: [sɐˌjusmʊlʲtˈfʲilʲm] , lit. 'Unioncartoon'), also known in English as SMF Animation Studio and formerly known as Soyuzmultdetfilm (Союзмультдетфи́льм, 'Unionchildcartoon'), is a Russian animation studio, production, and distribution company based in Moscow. Launched on June 10, 1936, as the animated film production unit of the U.S.S.R.'s motion picture monopoly, GUKF, Soyuzmultfilm has produced more than 1,500 cartoons. Soyuzmultfilm specializes in the creation of animated TV series, feature films and short films. The studio has made animated films in a wide variety of genres and art techniques, including stop motion, hand-drawn, 2D and 3D techniques. It is one of the oldest and largest animation studios in Russia.

The "Golden Collection" of Soyuzmultfilm, produced from the beginning of the 1950s and to the end of the 1980s, is considered to be the classics of the animation medium and the best works of world-renowned directors, production designers and animators. Among the studio's best-known films are Hedgehog in the Fog (1975), the Cheburashka series (1969–1983), the Well, Just You Wait! series (since 1969), Karlsson-on-the-Roof (1968) and others. Many of the films rank among the classics of world animation, garnered a multitude of international and Russian awards and prizes, and became an integral part of Russian and global culture.

In 2018, the studio released the feature film Hoffmaniada, considered a masterpiece of stop motion puppet animation, based on the tales of E.T.A. Hoffmann. The 3D full-length animated historical epic Suvorov is currently in production.

The studio has released 7 series projects since 2017. One of them is a sequel of the well-known Prostokvashino trilogy Mr. Theo, Cat and Dog based on the aesthetics of the original. Six other series, with new original scripts, are Orange Moo-cow, which is co-produced with Cyber Group Studios, Squared Zebra, Claymotions, The Adventures of Peter & Wolf, Captain Kraken and His Crew, Pirate School. The series Mr. Theo, Cat and Dog and Orange Moo-cow ranked in the top 5 among the cartoons shown on Russian television in 2019, according to Mediascope research company. Several other series are in production and expected to be released in the second half of 2020.

The shorts produced by the studio participate in prestigious festivals and receive international prizes. Among the recent award-winning shorts are: Vivat Musketeers! (2019), Good Heart (2018), Coco's Day (2017), The Sled (2016), Two Trams (2016), Moroshka (2015), Pik Pik Pik (2015) and others.

In addition to the production of animation, the studio launched many educational activities. Soyuzmultfilm conducts advanced training programmes for animators and script-writers. In 2018, it opened a development center for children Soyuzmultclub with animation workshops, interactive programs, regular animation courses for children, the museum. In 2020, the first indoor recreational multimedia park Soyuzmultfilm will be opened at the VDNKH exhibition center. A Technopark, which is to become the largest animation production centre in Russia, is being created on the basis of the studio.

== History ==
=== Early years ===
The film studio was founded on 10 June 1936, by order of the Chief Directorate of the Film and Photo Industry (GUKF) of the State Committee on the Arts under the Council of People's Commissars of the USSR. Two of the animated groups that existed in Moscow at that time were merged into a single film studio under the name Soyuzdetmultfilm, which was changed to Soyuzmultfilm in 1937. The studio was located at Novinsky Boulevard, 22.

The creative staff included already well-known masters of hand-drawn animation – Ivan Ivanov-Vano, Olga Khodataeva, Valentina and Zinaida Brumberg, Vladimir Suteev, Dmitry Babichenko, Alexander Ivanov and others.

Three-months retraining courses were organized by the studio for all creative artists. The masters taught young animators the basics of professional skills. The studio turned into the main production base of Soviet animation and became a creative centre for animation of the USSR. In the early years, Soyuzmultfilm embraced the cel technique – the so-called Disney's conveyor method, which was convenient for mass production of hand-drawn animation. Contour with a drawing pen and an exposure sheet borrowed from the Disney became essential elements of production. In the late 1930s, the studio began actively using the Eclair method (or rotoscoping), developed by the American animators Fleisher Brothers. The reason was the reorientation of the studio to current topics and the need to create not only grotesque, but also heroic characters. From the very beginning, the studio took as a basis for production the principle of division of work into separate specialties (in-betweeners, ink artists, paint artists), which accelerated the process of production and made it cheaper.

For several years Soyuzmultfilm focused mainly on the creation of entertaining shorts for children with animal characters depicted in a Disney manner. One of the first cartoons created at the studio was the black-and-white It's Hot in Africa (1936) by Dmitry Babichenko. That was the first experience of the famous children's poet Sergei Mikhalkov in animation as a screenwriter.

Despite the chosen direction, many animators developed their own styles – in particular, Vladimir Suteev (Noisy Swimming (1937) and Why does Rhinoceros' Skin have Folds (1938).

Since 1937, the studio started to produce color films. The first experience was Sweet Pie by Dmitry Babichenko. Many cartoons of 1938–1945 were made both in color and black-and-white.

If in 1936–1937 the animation was limited to the children's themes within the genres of fables and fairy tales, then in 1938 it was ordered to direct Soviet cinema to contemporary issues. The studio's repertoire policy was changed, it again began to produce political films in the genres of the Soviet "political fairy tale", political cartoons and agitprop posters. The possibility of portraying a person as a positive Soviet hero in animation was discussed. At that time, the films (Fedor the Hunter (1938) by Alexander Ivanov, War Chronicles (1939) by Dmitry Babichenko were produced.

In the late 1930s – early 1940s, was a shift in priorities from quantity to quality indicators. Animator courses were resumed. Films created between 1939 and 1941 were subsequently included in the "gold fund" of world cinema: Limpopo (1939) and Barmaley (1941) by Leonid Amalrik and Vladimir Polkovnikov, Moydodyr (1939) by Ivan Ivanov-Vano, Uncle Styopa (1939) and Fly-Tsokotuha (1941) by Vladimir Suteev. These cartoons defined the original "Soviet style" of animation.

=== War period ===
In the first months of the Great Patriotic War, all creative groups switched to producing anti-fascist propaganda posters. Many employees went to the front. In October, the part of the studio was evacuated to Samarkand, where the directors Mikhail Tsekhanovsky and Mstislav Pashchenko joined the team evacuated from the besieged Leningrad. They formed part of the Central United Film Studios team as a specialised division, independent from its leadership and keeping the brand. In Samarkand the studio worked in the strictest economy of materials and electricity. Scenarios were revised in order to simplify the production, which was extremely slow because of lack of materials and staff.

In 1943, Soyuzmultfilm returned to Moscow. In early 1944, the studio organized the first Arts Council. By the end of the 1940s, Korney Chukovsky, Samuil Marshak, Evgeny Schwartz, Sergey Bolotin, Oleg Erberg, Mikhail Volpin, Nikolai Erdman, Valentin Kataev, Yury Olesha, Boris Laskin, Lev Kassil, Vladimir Suteev, Georgy Grebner, Nikolai Klado, Georgy Berezko, Nikolai Abramov were invited to cooperate with the studio.

Under difficult working conditions, several outstanding films were created:

- The Fox, the Rabbit and the Rooster (1942) by Olga Khodataeva,
- Cinema-Circus (1942) by Leonid Amalrik and Olga Khodataeva,
- A New Year Tree (1942) by Mikhail Tsekhanovsky,
- The Telephone (1944) by Mikhail Tsekhanovsky,
- The Tale of Tsar Saltan (1942–1943)
- Sinbad the Sailor (1944) by the Brumberg sisters
- The Stolen Sun (1944) by Ivan Ivanov-Vano.

In 1945, the studio produced its first feature film A Disappeared Diploma by Valentina and Zinaida Brumberg, based on the story with the same name by Nikolai Gogol.

=== The golden age ===
Soon after the end of the war, in 1946, Soyuzmultfilm moved its offices to the building at Kalyaevskaya street (now Dolgorukovskaya Street), 23A (the former church of St. Nicholas the Wonderworker in New Sloboda, previously occupied by the Museum of the History of Religion and Atheism).

In the post-war years, the studio stopped the direct lifts of American animation techniques, and the original aesthetic "canon" of the children's Soviet cartoon was determined.

The best Soviet cartoons of the second half of the 1940s were distinguished by impressive plasticity and facial expressions, harmony of word and movement. A lot of new names appeared among the directors and artists of the studio: Lev Atamanov, Yevgeny Migunov, Leonid Shvartsman, Alexander Vinokurov and others. One of the main fundamental components of the Soviet cartoon school was continuity, when beginning animators gained professional experience from prominent artists and directors.

The most striking works of Soyuzmultfilm in the late 1940s were the animated films The Flower with Seven Colors (1948) by Mikhail Tsekhanovsky, Fedya Zaitsev (1948) by the Brumberg sisters, and Little Gray Neck (1948) by Leonid Amalrik and Vladimir Polkovnikov.

In 1947, Soyuzmultfilm received the first international award – The Song of Joy (1946) by Mstislav Pashchenko was awarded the bronze medal at the Venice Film Festival for the Best Animated Film.

In 1951, the film The Humpbacked Horse (1947) by Ivan Ivanov-Vano received the Special Jury Prize at the Cannes Film Festival.

In the first half of the 1950s, the studio released popular films, many of which were based on the use of the Eclair method:

- by Lev Atamanov
  - The Yellow Stork (1950)
  - The Scarlet Flower (1952)
  - The Golden Antelope (1954)
- by Mikhail Tsekhanovsky
  - When the Christmas Trees is Lit (1950)
  - Forest Adventurers (1951)
- The Naughty Kitten (1953) by Mstislav Pashchenko
- by Ivan Ivanov-Vano
  - Kashtanka (1952)
  - The Snow Maiden (1952)
- Magic Shop (1953) by Leonid Amalrik and Vladimir Polkovnikov.

In 1953, the studio began the production of puppet films. Two of the first stop motion animated films were At the Dacha (1954) by Grigory Lomidze and Two Greedy Bear Cubs (1954) by Vladimir Degtyarev. The first major success of the puppet production was the directorial debut of Yevgeny Migunov The Pencil and Blot –The Cheerful Hunters (1954), in which several technological innovations of making and shooting puppets were applied. Many employees of the State Central Puppet Theater under the direction of Sergey Obraztsov joined the staff of the studio's puppet association.

In 1956, having changed several addresses, the three-dimensional puppet film workshop received a permanent area in Spasopeskovsky Lane (the building of the Church of the Transfiguration of the Savior on the Sands).

In 1959, the well-known motion picture The Cloud in Love by Roman Kachanov and Anatoly Karanovich was released, combining stop motion, traditional and cutout animation, and won a number of prestigious awards at international festivals, including the prize of the International Film Press Federation (FIPRESCI).

In the middle 1950s, the studio began to abandon the naturalistic representation of hand-drawn films, prioritizing more conventional forms. The volume of filmmaking increased (at the peak of production by the beginning of the 1970s, the studio released more than 30 films a year), including annual production of feature films.

In 1957, Lev Atamanov put into practice the technique of assigning individual animators to specific characters (e.g. the role of Ole Lukøje was completely "played" by Fyodor Khitruk in the film The Snow Queen).

Among the most famous feature films of the studio of the second half of the 1950s:

- The Enchanted Boy (1955) by Alexandra Snezhko-Blotskaya and Vladimir Polkovnikov, which became the laureate of many prestigious film screenings,
- The Island of Mistakes (1955) by the Brumberg sisters,
- The Walnut Twig (1955) by Ivan Aksenchuk,
- The Fire Burns in the Yaranga (1956) by Olga Khodataeva,
- The Twelve Months (1956) by Ivan Ivanov-Vano,
- Once Upon a Time (1957 film) (1957) by Ivan Ivanov-Vano,
- The Brave Little Deer (1957) by Olga Khodataeva and Leonid Aristov,
- Little Ship (1956), by Leonid Amalrik
- The Cat’s House (1958) by Leonid Amalrik,
- The Adventures of Murzilka (1956) by Boris Stepantsev and Evgeny Raykovsky,
- Petya and Little Red Riding Hood (1958) by Boris Stepantsev and Evgeny Raykovsky,
- The Adventures of Buratino (1959) by Ivan Ivanov-Vano and Dmitry Babichenko

The studio also created cartoons for an adult audience:

- The Illegible Signature (1954) by Alexander Ivanov,
- The Villain's Sticker (1954) by Vsevolod Shcherbakov and Boris Stepantsev,
- Ballad of a Table (1955) by Mikhail Kalinin and Roman Davydov,
- The Wonder Girl (1957) by Alexander Ivanov,
- Familiar Pictures (1957) by Yevgeny Migunov

Familiar Pictures was shot entirely in an innovative for that time conventional manner.

=== Aesthetic switch ===
On the cusp of the 1960s, a crucial moment in the history of Russian animation occurred. The so-called "aesthetic switch" began with a whole galaxy of films:

- The Key (1961) by Lev Atamanov,
- The Little Goat (1961) by Roman Davydov,
- The Wild Swans (1962) by Mikhail and Vera Tsekhanovsky,
- The Bath House (1962) by Anatoly Karanovich and Sergey Yutkevich,
- The Flying Proletariat (1962) by Ivan Ivanov-Vano and Iosif Boyarsky
- The Story of a Crime, Fyodor Khitruk’s directorial debut (1962).

Since the 1960s, the range of stylistic, genre and technological searches and solutions had been continuously expanded and developed. The old production system prevented art from moving forward, and Fyodor Khitruk introduced a "team method" of working, in which animators were involved in film production from the very beginning.

In the 1960s, Soyuzmultfilm was also actively developing puppet animation. Colour, decoration, texture of the material were applied in a new way. Semi-dimensional, bas-relief, including paper dolls began to be used. A new breakthrough in children's puppet animation began with the famous films A Little Frog Is looking for His Father (1964) and The Mitten (1967) by Roman Kachanov, Who Said Meow? (1962) and The Little Goat Who Counted to Ten (1968) by Vladimir Degtyaryov.

During these years, many new animators joined the studio's puppet division: Mikhail Kamenetsky and Ivan Ufimtsev (Whose pine cones are in the forest? (1965)), Vadim Kurchevsky (My Green Crocodile (1966), The Legend of Grig (1967), Frantishek (1967)), Nikolay Serebryakov (I'm expecting a baby bird (1966), Happiness Is Not in the Hat (1968), Ball of Wool (1968)).

In the 1960s, the production of satirical cartoons increased. Animation began to raise acute social and philosophical topics. Especially famous were

- Big Troubles (1961) by the Brumberg sisters,
- The Man in the Frame (1966) by Fyodor Khitruk, Passion of Spies (1967) by Yefim Gamburg,
- There Lived Kozyavin (1966), and, banned by Soviet censorship,
- The Glass Harmonica (1968) by Andrei Khrzhanovsky.

The most famous works of the Soyuzmultfilm of the 1960s:

- Cipollino (1961) by Boris Dyozhkin,
- Shareholders (1963) by Roman Davydov,
- by Vladimir Polkovnikov
  - The Cockroach (1963),
  - The Fisherman Cat (1964),
- by Alexandra Snezhko-Blotskaya
  - Barankin, Be a Human! (1963),
  - The Daughter of the Sun (1963) and
  - Rikki-Tikki-Tavi (1965),
- Hail the Mail (1964) by Mikhail and Vera Tsekhanovsky,
- Lefty (1964) by Ivan Ivanov-Vano,
- Thumbelina (1964) by Leonid Amalrik
- About a Hippo Who Was Afraid of Vaccinations (1966) by Leonid Amalrik,
- Toptyzhka (1964),
- Boniface's Vacation (1965),
- Film, Film, Film (1968) by Fyodor Khitruk,
- by Boris Stepantsev
  - Vovka in the Faraway Kingdom (1965)
  - Window (1966),
- Mezha (1967) by Vyacheslav Kotyonochkin,
- The Train from Romashkovo (1967) by Vladimir Degtyarev,
- The Mouse's Song (1967) by Yuri Prytkov,
- by Lev Atamanov
  - The Bench (1967),
  - The Ballerina on the Ship (1969),
- An Alarm Clock (1967) by Lev Milchin
- Grandmother's Umbrella (1969) by Lev Milchin,
- Puss in Boots (1968) by the Brumberg sisters,
- The Little Mermaid (1968) by Ivan Aksenchuk,

and cartoons about sports Snowy Roads (1963), Puck! Puck! (1964), A Rematch (1968) and Meteor in the Ring (1970) by Boris Dyozhkin.

In 1968, Yuri Norstein and Arkady Tyurin made a directorial debut with an unscheduled film The 25th, the First Day.

In 1969, the animated anthology series Happy Merry-Go-Round was founded. The first release was produced under the direction of Roman Kachanov by the beginning directors Anatoly Petrov, Gennady Sokolsky, Leonid Nosyrev, Valery Ugarov and Galina Barinova, the world-recognised masters of animation today. The famous to this day Antoshka and the first artistic presentation of Well, Just You Wait!, which was soon turned into a popular series of its own, were released exactly in the first run of Happy Merry-Go-Round. Experimental technologies, audacious concepts and innovation solutions were often used in the production of the shorts.

The period from the beginning of the 1970s to the middle 1980s is called the halcyon days of Soyuzmultfilm. At that time, it became the largest animation studio in Europe, that employed more than 500 people and released more than 1000 films.

In the late 1960s and early 1970s, the most popular cartoons appeared:

- The Bremen Town Musicians (1969) by Inessa Kovalevskaya
- On the Trail of the Bremen Town Musicians (1973) by Vasily Livanov,
- Crocodile Gena and His Friends the series based on the fairy tale novel by Eduard Uspensky
  - Gena the Crocodile (1969),
  - Cheburashka (1971), Shapoklyak (1974), Cheburashka Goes to School (1983) by Roman Kachanov,
- the series Well, Just You Wait! by Vyacheslav Kotyonochkin (first released in 1969),
- a dilogy about Karlsson-on-the-Roof based on the famous book by the Swedish writer Astrid Lindgren
  - Junior and Karlson (1968) and
  - Karlson Returns (1970) by Boris Stepantsev,
- the series of films Umka (1969) and Umka is Looking for a Friend (1970) by Vladimir Pekar and Vladimir Popov,
- the films based on A. A. Milne's Winnie-the-Pooh stories in Boris Zakhoder’s retelling
  - Winnie-the-Pooh (1969),
  - Winnie-the-Pooh Pays a Visit (1971),
  - Winnie-the-Pooh and a Busy Day (1972) by Fyodor Khitruk (the last one produced together with Gennady Sokolsky),
- adaptation of The Jungle Book by Rudyard Kipling, Adventures of Mowgli (1967–1971) by Roman Davydov.

Recognized masters of hand-drawn animation continued to work at the studio: Boris Stepantsev (The Nutcracker (1973)), Ivan Ivanov-Vano (The Humpbacked Horse (1975)), Lev Atamanov (The Pony Runs Around (1974)), a series of cartoons The Kitten Named Woof (1976–1982)), Lev Milchin (The Steadfast Tin Soldier (1976)), Fyodor Khitruk (Icarus and the Wise Men (1976)), Andrei Khrzhanovsky (The House That Jack Built (1976), I Fly to You Like a Memory (1977), And I Am with You Again (1980), Autumn (1982)), Vladimir Popov (Bobik Visits Barbos (1977), the trilogy – Three from Prostokvashino (1978)), Holidays in Prostokvashino (1980), Winter in Prostokvashino (1984)), Yefim Gamburg (Robbery, ... Style (1978)).

At that period were released:

- musical films
  - How the Lion and the Turtle Sang a Song (1974) by Inessa Kovalevskaya
  - In the Port (1975) by Inessa Kovalevskaya,
  - Blue Puppy (1976) by Yefim Gamburg,
  - A Flying Ship (1979) by Garri Bardin,
  - Before We Were Birds (1982) by Garri Bardin,
- science-fiction films
  - Phaeton −The Son of the Sun (1972) by Vasily Livanov,
  - Mirror of Time (1976) by Vladimir Tarasov,
- fantasy adventure films
  - Contact (1978) by Vladimir Tarasov,
  - The Mystery of the Third Planet (1981) by Roman Kachanov,
- epic films
  - Ilya Muromets (1975) by Ivan Aksenchuk,
  - Vasilisa Mikulishna (1975) by Roman Davydov, films based on Greek mythology
- The Labyrinth (1971),
- Argonauts (1971),
- Perseus (1973),
- Prometheus (1974) by Alexandra Snezhko-Blotskaya.

The cartoons Island (1973) and I Grant You A Star (1974) by Fyodor Khitruk were awarded at the Cannes Film Festival short films competition.

The new generation of directors actively produced films, among them:

- Valentin Karavaev (Ded Moroz and Summer (1969),
- The Wise Gudgeon (1979)), Gennady Sokolsky (The Little Tari Bird (1976),
- The Castle of Liars (1983)),
- Valery Ugarov (The Secret Box (1976),
- mini-series
  - On the Back Desk (1978–1985),
  - Caliph Stork (1981)),
  - Galina Barinova (A Terrible Story (1979)).

Anatoly Petrov, using traditional animation materials, invented the technique of photographics and created films in hyperrealism aesthetics (And Mother Will Forgive Me (1975), Polygon (1977).

Over the years many talented Soviet composers performed in the animation: Isaak Dunayevsky, Nikita Bogoslovsky, Alexander Varlamov, Karen Khachaturyan, Alfred Schnittke, Gennady Gladkov, Alexander Zatsepin, Yevgeny Krylatov, Vladimir Shainsky, Alexey Rybnikov, Maksim Dunayevsky, Mikhail Meerovich, Sofia Gubaidulina and others.

Alongside famous composers, musicians and sound engineers, prominent theatre and cinema actors worked at the studio, voicing popular characters: Yevgeny Leonov (Winnie-the-Pooh), Anatoli Papanov (Wolf in the series Well, Just You Wait!), Vasily Livanov (Karlsson-on-the-Roof and Gena the Crocodile), Klara Rumyanova (Lillebror from Karlsson-on-the-Roof, Cheburashka, Hare from Well, Just You Wait!), Maria Vinogradova (Hedgehog from Hedgehog in the Fog, Uncle Fyodor from Three from Prostokvashino). The Bremen Town Musicians are singing with the voices of Oleg Anofriyev and Muslim Magomayev, Faina Ranevskaya even finished the dialogue of the housekeeper Fröken Bock.

Many series characters became cult figures for several generations of viewers (the main heroes from Winnie-the-Pooh, Cheburashka, Karlsson-on-the-Roof, Well, Just You Wait!, Three from Prostokvashino).

Masters of the puppet association created popular films:

- Vladimir Degtyaryov
  - How the Little Donkey Looked for the Happiness (1971), (which was seen in Mister Rogers' Neighborhood episode 1582)
  - The New Year Tale (1972),
- Ivan Ufimtsev
  - 10-episode cartoon 38 Parrots (first episode was released in 1976),
- Mikhail Kamenetsky
  - 4-episode cartoon The Little Dwarf (1977–1983)
  - 5-episode cartoon The Boatswain and the Parrot (1982–1986)
  - The Wolf and the Calf (1984).

During that period the films The Master of Clamecy (1972) and Sadko the Rich (1975) by Vadim Kurchevsky, Crane’s Feathers (1977) and Balagan (1981) by Ideya Garanina, The Guess (1977) and Black and White Cinema (1984) by Stanislav Sokolov, The Memories (1986) by Vladimir Arbekov were released.

Yuri Norstein continued directing – he developed a new technological direction ("multiplane cut-out animation") to give his animation a three-dimensional look and introduced a number of innovative techniques together with the cinematographer Aleksandr Zhukovskiy. His films The Fox and the Hare (1973), The Heron and the Crane (1974), Tale of Tales (1979) received worldwide recognition. The cartoon Hedgehog in the Fog (1975) won more than 35 international and All-Union awards, and in 2003, it was recognized as the best animated film of all time according to a survey of 140 film critics and animators from different countries. By the early 1980s, Soyuzmultfilm's works won a total of more than 150 prizes and diplomas at international and domestic festivals.

The studio significantly expanded its thematic boundaries. The repertoire "grew up", a number of large-scale projects were launched: The Overcoat (begun in 1981, but not completed) by Yuri Norstein, Heracles at Admetus (1986) by Anatoly Petrov and others.

Soyuzmultfilm released a series of sports themed cartoons dedicated to the Moscow 1980 Summer Olympics. The main character of most of the films was the mascot of the Olympics – the bear cub Misha:

- Who Will Get the Prize? (1979) by Vyacheslav Kotyonochkin,
- Where Is the Teddy Bear? (1979) Leonid Kayukov,
- Salute, the Olympics! (1979) Inessa Kovalevskaya,
- three films under the general title Baba Yaga is against! (1979–1980) by Vladimir Pekar,
- The First Autograph (1980) by Boris Dyozhkin.
- Monkeys (series) (1983–1997) by Leonid Shvartsman

By the beginning of the 1980s, viewers became aware of the new names of the directors – Eduard Nazarov (The Princess and the Ogre (1977), Once Upon a Dog (1982), Adventure of an Ant (1983)) and Garri Bardin, experimenting with unconventional textures and materials (Conflict (1983)). In 2012, the film Once Upon a Dog was recognized as the best Russian film in 100 years at the Open Russian Festival of Animated Film in Suzdal.

Leonid Nosyrev explored the Russian North folklore with a series of films based on the stories by Boris Shergin and Stepan Pisakhov: If you don't like it – don't listen (1977), The Magic Ring (1979), Arkhangelsk Novels (1986).

The domestic animation became a multigenre form of national cinema – the studio actively produced philosophical parables, extended social metaphors, tragicomedies, satirical short films, poetry films, romantic ballads.

=== Reformation period ===
Among the best films made at the studio in 1984–1990:

- The Tale of Tsar Saltan (1984) by Ivan Ivanov-Vano and Lev Milchin,
- About Sidorov Vova (1985) by Eduard Nazarov,
- Martynko (1987) by Eduard Nazarov,
- the animated series The Return of the Prodigal Parrot (1984–1988) by Valentin Karavaev and Alexandr Davydov,
- The School of Fine Arts. The Landscape with Juniper (1987) by Andrei Khrzhanovsky and Valery Ugarov,
- Kele (1988) by Mikhail Aldashin and Peep Pedmanson,
- Bear-Night-Mare (1988) by Alexey Turkus, Alexey Shelmanov, Vasily Kafanov,
- Girlfriend (1989) by Yelena Gavrilko,
- The Shoemaker and the Mermaid (1989) by Valery Ugarov,
- Break! (1985),
- Banquet (1986),
- Marriage (1987),
- Fioritures (1987),
- Grey Wolf and Little Red Riding Hood (1990) by Garri Bardin.

The short film Fioritures was awarded the Short Film Palme d'Or at the Cannes Film Festival in 1988.

In the late 1980s, gifted masters of stop motion animation appeared in the studio's team – Natalia Dabizha (Vanya and the Crocodile (1984), The Lonely Grand Piano (1986)), Maria Muat (The Crow of an Amorous Disposition (1988), Ancient Lyrics (1989)), Sergey Olifirenko (How Ninochka became a Princess (1990), Mashenka (1992)).

Throughout its history, Soyuzmultfilm collaborated on a number of various projects with film and animation studios of Europe and Asia. In 1981, the musical feature film Maria, Mirabela, in which Lev Milchin and Victor Dudkin appeared as production designers, was released together with the Romanian studio Casa de Filme 5 and Moldova-Film.

In 1987, the animated trilogy The Adventures of Lolo the Penguin, directed by Gennady Sokolsky and Kenji Yoshida, was released jointly with the Japan's Lifework Corporation.

Since 1989, in collaboration with S4C (UK) television channel the series of the anthology Shakespeare: The Animated Tales, based on the plays of William Shakespeare, began. The series was co-directed by several Russian animators – Stanislav Sokolov, Maria Muat, Nikolay Serebryakov, Yefim Gamburg and Natalia Orlova. The premiere took place in 1992 on BBC2. The show was highly praised by viewers and critics and won three Emmy Awards.

In the second half of the 1980s, the work of the studio was reorganized. In 1988, five creative associations were formed within Soyuzmultfilm: Search (art director Andrei Khrzhanovsky), Comics (art director Vladimir Tarasov), Tradition (art director Anatoly Petrov), Children's film (art director Vyacheslav Kotyonochkin), 3D stop motion (art director Vadim Kurchevsky), as well as the stand-alone workshop by Yuri Norstein. That lasted until 1990, when the studio's division into Creative Production Association for stop motion and hand-drawn films was returned.

=== Post-Soviet era ===
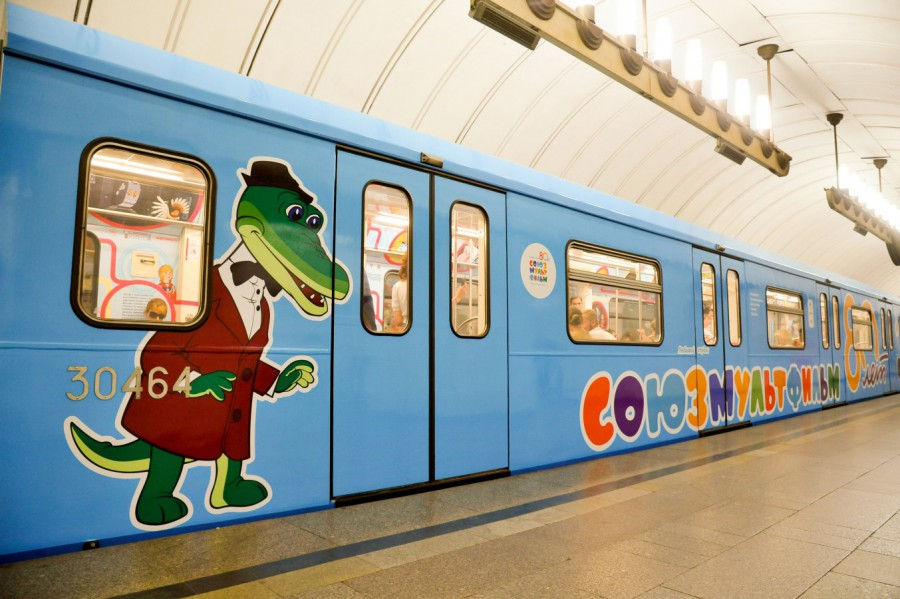
Moscow Metro train dedicated to the 80th anniversary of the Soyuzmultfilm studio

In the early 1990s, new economic realities made it impossible for the government to support the studio any longer, and cartoon production decreased dramatically. Soyuzmultfilm was experiencing several crises at once – production and creativity, a number of talented employees left the studio. The production mechanism became impaired, there was a shortage of animators and workshop personnel, and the creative atmosphere was drying up. The studio lost its leading position in the system of Soviet film studios producing animated films. Production volumes were falling gradually. The USSR State Committee for Cinematography began to reduce the amount of funding for the studio.

In 1989–1999, Soyuzmultfilm was made into a leased enterprise – the staff members leased their own studio from the state in order to continue producing films.

In 1993–1995, the studio lost its puppet division building, which was transferred to the Russian Orthodox Church.

In 1990s, Soyuzmultfilm became a production base for independent private studios as well (Christmas Films, Argus International, School-Studio SHAR, Renaissance, Studio 13, Chris, Polinkevich and others). Film production almost completely ceased.

In 1999, pursuant to the Decree of the President of the Russian Federation Boris Yeltsin, a new structure was established – the Federal State Unitary Enterprise (FSUE) "Soyuzmultfilm Film Studio", which was given the premises, production facilities and film rights.

In 2004, it was decided to establish the FSUE "Soyuzmultfilm Film Fund", which was supposed to manage the film rights and headed by Ernest Rakhimov, and the FSUE Creative Production Association "Soyuzmultfilm Film Studio", headed by Akop Kirakosyan, and which mission was to create new films.

In 2008–2009, the FSUE "Soyuzmultfilm Film Fund" was transformed into the "United State Film Collection".

Gradually there was a technical re-equipment of the studio. Directors Sergey Kositsyn, Natalya Dabizha, Aida Zyablikova, Galina Shakitskaya, Natalya Ryss, Elvira Avakyan and others collaborated with Soyuzmultfilm.

In 2005, Stanislav Sokolov began the production of the stop motion feature film Hoffmaniada. In 2008, the post of artistic director was introduced at the studio. It was occupied by Natalya Dabizha (until 2010) and Stanislav Sokolov (in 2011–2013).

== The studio today ==
In 2011, Vladimir Putin, at the meeting with animation directors, decided to abolish the "United State Film Collection" and transfer the films to the studio. He also promised to significantly increase funding for domestic animation and children's cinema.

From that moment, with the support of the state represented by the Ministry of Culture, the studio got out of crisis and the revival of Soyuzmultfilm began.

From 2013 to 2016, the artistic director of the studio was Mikhail Aldashin.

At the time, the production was activated, many new films were made, new directors were involved in the process.

In 2015, the Experimental Youth Association was established, under the special programme "Production and Training", which is designed for directors and animators who want to develop and improve their professional skills.

In 2016, the Soyuzmultfilm film studio celebrated its 80th anniversary.

As of today, Soyuzmultfilm received about 90% of the film rights to its collection.

In terms of the number of projects and the volume of created content, Soyuzmultfilm has reached the level of a major film studio and presents its projects again at international film and television markets.

In August 2021, Soyuzmultfilm was facelifted from Federal State Unitary Enterprise (FGUP) to joint stock company with 100% of shares held by Federal Agency for State Property Management (Rosimushchestvo) according to the plan of reorganization of FGUPs by the Government of Russia. In a future, 75% of share or even more will be offered for sale and the rest will be held by Rosimushchestvo on behalf of the Government of Russia.

=== New headquarters ===
In 2017, Soyuzmultfilm moved to a new building on Akademika Korolyova Street, with almost 6000 square meters of floor space. There are about 300 employees in the studio today, 250 of them are engaged in the projects production process. Up-and-coming talents work under the guidance of experienced masters of animation.

=== Top management ===
In 2017, by order of the Ministry of Culture a new collegial-advisory body – the board – was established at the studio. Since February, 2017, Yuliana Slashcheva has been managing the Soyuzmultfilm studio as the chairman of the board. Her past experience includes a position of chief executive officer of the leading Russian independent broadcasting holding CTC Media. Yuliana has several significant rewards in the Media Business category – in 2007, she was included in the ranking of the Most Influential Business Women in Russia, prepared by Career magazine, and became the winner of the annual national award Media Manager of Russia 2007 in the nomination "Public Relations", in 2015, Yuliana appeared on the list of The 20 Most Powerful Women in Global TV 2015, prepared by The Hollywood Reporter.

In July, 2017, Boris Mashkovtsev became the director of the Soyuzmultfilm film studio. Before that he was heading Airplane Studio LLC, bringing with him over a decade of experience in animation production. Boris is also a member of the management board of the Russian Animated Films Association. Boris is one of the key experts in the animation industry in Russia, he is a co-author and the chief scholarly editor of A Dictionary of Modern Animation Terminology and co-author of the textbook Producing Animated Films.

Since June, 2019, Julia Osetinskaya became the general producer of the studio. She was the executive producer in Riki Group and the head of Riki Development Fund, where she developed and produced several successful new animated brands and projects of the group.

=== Art techniques ===
The studio today is equipped with modern facilities and presents a wide variety of animation techniques: hand-drawn animation, 2D animation, stop motion animation and 3D animation, using CGI graphics. Despite the digitization, the studio tries to preserve the aesthetics as much as possible.

Recently, Soyuzmultfilm has developed and patented several technological solutions.

=== TV series ===
Today the studio is actively engaged in the development of series production with a focus on international markets. Soyuzmultfilm actively develops co-production and creates projects with other well-known studios.

Nowadays Soyuzmultfilm has seven released projects. Several other series are in production and expected to be released in the second half of 2020.

The main direction of the studio is the creation of completely new, original images and characters. Six projects have original scripts and heroes. The animated series are intent on not only at entertaining children, but also at education and personal development through visualization in a funny way without strict edification. Most of the series are created with the participation of professional media psychologists.

Together with Channel One Soyuzmultfilm is creating the educational mini-series aimed at the very youngest audience segment Claymotions (2+) (since 2018), made in authentic clay-motion technique and teaching kids through games. The musical comedy Orange Moo-cow (3+) (since 2019), co-produced with Cyber Group Studios, forms important value orientations among children. The adventure comedy for family viewing Squared Zebra (3+) (since 2020) approaches to the topic of tolerance. The adventure story Captain Kraken and His Crew (4+) (since 2017), co-produced with Rocket Fox Animation Studio, shows children how to act in various life situations. The adventure social comedy Pirate School (8+) (since 2018) was the only Russian series project that entered the competition program of the Annecy International Animated Film Festival, in 2018, and became a winner at the Open Russian Festival of Animated Film in Suzdal as Best Series, in 2020. The series for a teenage audience The Adventures of Peter & Wolf (12+) (since 2020), in which the real world and the magical world collide, is full of funny adventures and many unexpected events. The series develops ability to think out of the box and find a way out of any situation with the help of knowledge and ingenuity.

At the same time, Soyuzmultfilm preserves the continuity of the classic legacy and keeps the atmosphere of the original cartoons with a focus on modern audience. One of the most popular series – the adventure family sitcom Mr. Theo, Cat and Dog (6+) (since 2018) which is a sequel of the famous Russian trilogy Prostokvashino based on the book by Eduard Uspensky. It is produced in the traditional technique of complex hand-drawn animation, where each scene is sketched manually, but today it is made with a stylus on the touchpad so that it looks modern. The mission of Mr. Theo, Cat and Dog is to develop kids’ imagination and sense of humor, using exciting and entertaining stories with a strong comic element in them, and to encourage independence and nurture critical thinking of children. The premiere of the series became the record breaker for the number of views on the air of the Carousel Russian television channel and collected more than 1 million views in just 2,5 hours on social networks.

The series Orange Moo-cow and Mr. Theo, Cat and Dog took 2nd and 4th places, respectively, among the animated series shown on Russian TV in 2019, according to the 4-17-year-old audience rating of the most-watched television programme which lasts more than 5 minutes, Mediascope research company indicates.

The 2021 series Rockoons, about a group of seven differently colored performing raccoons, is one of a few Russian animated media that took part in the Key Buyers Event for a chance to gain worldwide exposure.

=== Feature films ===
One of the main directions that the studio is developing today is a production of feature films.

In 2018, the studio released the stop motion puppet animated fantasy Hoffmaniada directed by Stanislav Sokolov, which was being produced for 17 years. The film conceptualized the struggles of an animation studio and its revival through its historic production cycle.

The film is about the life and work of renowned German writer Ernst Theodor Amadeus Hoffmann. The screenplay incorporates storylines and characters from his tales The Golden Pot, The Sandman, and Klein Zaches genannt Zinnober.

Hoffmaniada premiered on June 11, 2018, at the Annecy International Animation Film Festival in official selection Out of Competition. The film released in Russia on 11 October 2018 and later in Japan in 2019. The feature received positive reviews from critics who remarked the film is at the same level as contemporary legends of stop motion films succeeding in reviving 19th century Romanticism literature in animation format. It won awards at the Golden Eagle Award as Best Animated Film, the Icarus, the Brazil Stop Motion International Film Festival award, and was nominated at the Asia-Pacific Screen Awards as Best Animated Film.

A new animated feature for family viewing Suvorov, co-produced by Gorky Film Studio, is currently in production. It is a historical fiction, which combines several genres: adventure, military historical and biographical. Suvorov is made in CGI graphics and 3D with motion capture technology. This entertaining and educational story promotes traditional values of loyalty, courage and self-realization, filled with the spirit of adventure, subtle humor and romance.

=== Animated shorts ===
This is the direction that Soyuzmultfilm has been engaged in for the past 20 years, preserving the traditional school of the studio – hand-drawn animation. "Original author animation is a mandatory area for development, it moves the industry forward from an artistic point of view, invents new techniques and stories", says Julia Osetinskaya. "This is our workshop of ideas. Our task now is to continue to develop and maintain this course of production, and to find the most talented directors, artists and animators", made it clear Yuliana Slashcheva. "This comes up with not only producing of high-quality short author films, but also with potential ideas for further use in series and feature films".

As of 2019, the studio produced more than 80 new short animated films, and keeps producing approximately 10–15 short films a year.

The shorts produced by the studio regularly participate in prestigious international festivals. Among the recent award-winning shorts are:

- Vivat Musketeers! (2019) by Anton Diakov,
- Good Heart (2018) by Evgenia Zhirkova,
- I Want to Live in the Zoo (2017) by Evgenia Golubeva, Coco's Day (2017) by Tatyana Moshkova,
- Trunky (2017) by Ekaterina Filippova,
- About Our Astronauts (2018) by Galina Golubeva,
- The Sled (2016) by Olesya Shchukina,
- Two Trams (2016) by Svetlana Andrianova,
- Moroshka (2015) by Polina Minchenok,
- Pik Pik Pik (2015) by Dmitry Visotsky,
- Mama Heron (2015) by Marina Karpova

and others.

Among the studio's production are new programmes of the legendary compilation of animated shorts for children Happy Merry-Go-Round, first released in 1969. The collection includes unique works in gouache and sand techniques. The production of animated shorts at the studio is supervised by the masters of animation – artistic directors and creative producers Mikhail Aldashin and Igor Kovalyov. Both of them, in 2019, became the members of the Oscars, selected nominees and chose winners at the ceremony. In 2017, Soyuzmultfilm released the new Bicycle almanac, which was created by students of animation colleges and up-and-coming directors.

=== New start of the Golden collection ===
Soyuzmultfilm is in the process of restoring classic tapes – the cartoons are digitized, color-corrected and given a modern surround sound. The first to be digitized and shown at cinemas are the most popular cartoons among viewers: The Twelve months (1956), The Snow Queen (1957), The Adventures of Buratino (1959), The Nutcracker (1973), The Mystery of the Third Planet (1981), The Tale of Tsar Saltan (1984).

According to surveys of kids, the heroes of the "Golden collection" are among the most popular and favorite children's characters. The studio decided to create a continuation of these cartoons. "We selected the ten most popular characters from the old collection and are ready to give a new lease of life to them. Our task is to pack the new product with respect to the continuity of the animation traditions, using a modern language and a visual range that is understandable to modern children", Yuliana Slashcheva says. In 2018, Soyuzmultfilm announced about a release of the continuation of the cult cartoons: Well, Just You Wait!, Adventures of Mowgli, Umka, The Bremen Town Musicians, Cheburashka and some others. In 2020, the second re-release of the Golden Collection commenced on 19 December 2020. The High Definition film restoration materials for the films were released. The film stock were renewed with all the film grain and extra flickering dots removed ensuring the stability of the films for the foreseeable future. Distributed by United Network "Cinema Park", the HD version of the classics are screened in many of the major cities in Russia.

== Awards ==
- 1951 — IV Cannes Film Festival: the Special Jury Prize – The Humpbacked Horse by Ivan Ivanov-Vano
- 1955 — VIII Cannes Film Festival: Short Film Special Distinction – The Golden Antelope by Lev Atamanov
- 1957 — Venice Film Festival: Golden Lion in the animated film category – The Snow Queen by Lev Atamanov
- 1967 — Annecy International Animated Film Festival: Children's film Award – The Mitten by Roman Kachanov
- 1974 — XXVII Cannes Film Festival: Grand Prize of the Festival – short films – Island by Fyodor Khitruk
- 1975 — XXVIII Cannes Film Festival: Short Film Special Jury Prize – I Grant You A Star by Fyodor Khitruk
- 1980 — Ottawa International Animation Festival: Category A, Films Longer Than 3 Minutes – 1st Prize – Tale of Tales by Yuri Norstein
- 1984 — Olympiad of Animation by ASIFA-Hollywood: The greatest animated film of all time – Tale of Tales by Yuri Norstein
- 1986 — International Leipzig Festival for Documentary and Animated Film: Golden Dove – Break! by Garri Bardin
- 1988 — XLI Cannes Film Festival: Short Film Palme d'Or – Fioritures by Garri Bardin
- 2003 — Laputa Animation Festival: 150 Best Animations of All Time – 1st place – Hedgehog in The Fog by Yuri Norstein
- 2003 — Laputa Animation Festival: 150 Best Animations of All Time – 2nd place – Tale of Tales by Yuri Norstein
- 2014 — Hiroshima International Animation Festival: Special Jury Prize – Pik Pik Pik by Dmitry Visotsky
- 2017 — Zlín Film Festival: Golden Slipper for the Best Animated Film – Two Trams by Svetlana Andrianova
- 2017 — Zlín Film Festival: The Hermína Týrlová Award for young artists under 35 – Moroshka by Polina Minchenok
- 2017 — KLIK Amsterdam Animation Festival: Young Audience Award Kids 3-5 – The Sled by Olesya Shchukina
- 2018 — Annecy International Animated Film Festival: Young Audience Award – Vivat Musketeers! by Anton Diakov
- 2018 — Stuttgart International Festival of Animated Film: Tricks For Kids Shorts – Coco's Day by Tatyana Moshkova
- 2019 — Golden Eagle Award: Best Animated Film – Hoffmaniada by Stanislav Sokolov

== Films by Jove controversy ==
In 1992, the studio signed a deal with the American company Films by Jove, owned by Russian immigrant actor Oleg Vidov and his American wife Joan Borsten. It was the first international offer that the studio had received. The deal stipulated that Films by Jove would be granted the rights to 547 of the most popular classic studio films for a period of 10 years in all territories except the CIS; as part of the return, Soyuzmultfilm would receive 37% of the net profits. Films by Jove restored many of the films and released many of them on television, video and DVD in the United States and Europe, albeit usually with dubbed voices (in the case of the series "Mikhail Baryshnakov's Stories from my Childhood" having celebrity actors dubbing some characters in the films featured in the series) and changed music.

According to current director Akop Kirakosyan, the original deal seemed promising at the time but turned out to be "deadly" for the studio. The expected payouts never materialized because Films by Jove never posted any net profits; all of the money officially went to things such as new soundtracks, lawsuits and copy protection measures.

Whether either deal was legal was debated in court, with the Soyuzmultfilm Film Fund (see section below) claiming that because the company's lease on its possessions would have expired in 1999 (at which time ownership would have automatically reverted to the government if no new lease were signed), Soyuzmultfilm had no authority to issue rights that lasted beyond that timeframe. Joan Borsten presented a different story. In the end, the Russian courts sided with Soyuzmultfilm and the American courts sided with Films by Jove.

U.S. Federal Court found that the Russian government has twice tried to invalidate Judge Trager's August 2001 summary judgment decision in favor of Films By Jove and transfer the copyrights to a library of 1,500 animated films, which Films by Jove licensed from Soyuzmultfilm Studios in 1992 to a new state-owned company. The judge found evidence of "continued actions being taken by the Russian government and judiciary to influence the outcome of this United States litigation with the purpose of depriving plaintiff Films by Jove of its right to distribute the animated films in the United States and elsewhere outside the former Soviet Union." The voluminous and very thorough decision further noted that, "In the case at bar, expropriation of the property of an American company by an act of a foreign sovereign is unquestionably against the public policy of the United States."

On 11 April 2007, Russian businessman Alisher Usmanov announced that he was in the final stages of negotiating a price with Films by Jove to buy back the collection. A source close to Usmanov said that Films by Jove's initial price was $10 million, while Usmanov is willing to pay "several times less", as he considers that the rights already belong to Soyuzmultfilm and that he himself is only buying the physical film prints. In September 2007, the deal was finalized, and Usmanov handed everything over to Russian state children's TV channel Bibigon.

== Notable artists ==
Animators and directors

- Leonid Amalrik
- Lev Atamanov
- Garri Bardin
- Brumberg sisters
- Roman Davydov
- Boris Dyozhkin
- Yefim Gamburg
- Ivan Ivanov-Vano
- Roman Kachanov
- Fyodor Khitruk
- Vyacheslav Kotyonochkin
- Eduard Nazarov
- Yuri Norstein
- Vladimir Popov
- Nikolay Serebryakov
- Leonid Shvartsman
- Stanislav Sokolov
- Boris Stepantsev
- Vladimir Tarasov
- Francheska Yarbusova

Actors

- Oleg Anofriyev
- Maria Babanova
- Lev Durov
- Lyudmila Gnilova
- Alexey Gribov
- Vsevolod Larionov
- Yevgeny Leonov
- Vasily Livanov
- Sergey Martinson
- Georgy Millyar
- Andrei Mironov
- Vyacheslav Nevinny
- Anatoli Papanov
- Klara Rumyanova
- Grigory Shpigel
- Oleg Tabakov
- Yevgeny Vesnik
- Maria Vinogradova
- Georgy Vitsin
- Rina Zelyonaya

== List of notable films ==
- 1945 The Lost Letter (Пропавшая грамота)
- 1947 To You, Moscow (Тебе, Москва!)
- 1947 The Humpbacked Horse (Конёк-Горбуно́к)
- 1951 The Tale of the Dead Tsarevna and the Seven Bogatyrs (Сказка о мёртвой царевне и о семи богатырях)
- 1951 The Night Before Christmas (Ночь перед Рождеством)
- 1952 The Scarlet Flower (А́ленький цвето́чек)
- 1952 The Snow Maiden (Снегу́рочка)
- 1952 Kashtanka (Каштанка)
- 1953 Flight to the Moon (ПОЛЕТ НА ЛУНУ)
- 1954 The Golden Antelope (Золотая антилопа)
- 1954 Tsarevna the Frog (Царевна лягушка)
- 1955 The Enchanted Boy (Заколдованный мальчик)
- 1956 The Twelve Months (Двенадцать месяцев)
- 1956 The Ugly Duckling (Гадкий утенок)
- 1956 The Tale of the Priest and of His Workman Balda (Сказка о попе и его работнике Балде)
- 1957 The Snow Queen (Сне́жная короле́ва)
- 1958 Beloved Beauty (Краса́ ненагля́дная)
- 1959 The Adventures of Buratino (Приключе́ния Бурати́но)
- 1961 Chipolino (Чиполлино)
- 1962 The Story of a Crime (Исто́рия одного́ преступле́ния)
- 1962 The Wild Swans (Ди́кие ле́беди)
- 1964 Lefty (Левша́)
- 1964 Thumbelina (Дюймовочка)
- 1965 Boniface's Holiday (Каникулы Бонифация)
- 1966 There Lived Kozyavin (Жил-был Козявин)
- 1967 Mowgli (Ма́угли)
- 1968 Little Boy and Karlsson (Малы́ш и Ка́рлсон)
- 1968 The Little Mermaid (Русалочка)
- 1969–2006 Well, Just You Wait! (Ну, погоди!)
- 1969 Crocodile Gena (Крокодил Гена)
- 1969, released 1986 The Glass Harmonica (Стеклянная гармоника)
- 1969 The Bremen Town Musicians (Бременские музыканты)
- 1969 Winnie-the-Pooh (Винни-Пух)
- 1969 Film, Film, Film (Фильм, фильм, фильм)
- 1969 Umka (Умка)
- 1970 Karlsson Returns (Ка́рлсон верну́лся)
- 1970 Umka is Looking for a Friend (Умка ищет друга)
- 1971 Cheburashka (Чебура́шка)
- 1971 Losharik (Лошарик)
- 1971 How the Little Donkey Looked for the Happiness (Как ослик счастье искал)
- 1971 Winnie-the-Pooh Goes on a Visit (Ви́нни-Пух идёт в го́сти)
- 1972 Winnie-the-Pooh and the Day of Concern (Ви́нни-Пу́х и день забо́т)
- 1972 In The 30th Century (в тридесятом веке)
- 1972 Phaeton: The Son of Sun (Фаэтон - Сын Солнца)
- 1973 Miracle (Чудо)
- 1973 On the Trail of Town Musicians of Bremen (По следа́м бре́менских музыка́нтов)
- 1973 The Heron and the Crane (Ца́пля и жура́вль)
- 1973 The Island (О́стров)
- 1973 The Nutcracker (Щелку́нчик)
- 1973 The Fox and the Hare (Лиса и заяц)
- 1974 Prometheus (ПРОМЕТЕЙ)
- 1974 Shapoklyak (Шапокля́к)
- 1975 Hedgehog in the Fog (Ёжик в тума́не)
- 1976–1991 38 Parrots (38 попуга́ев)
- 1977 Polygon (Полигон)
- 1978 Three from Prostokvashino (Тро́е из Простоква́шино)
- 1978 Contact (Конта́кт)
- 1979 Tale of Tales (Ска́зка ска́зок)
- 1981 The Mystery of the Third Planet (Та́йна тре́тьей плане́ты)
- 1981 Dog in Boots (Пёс в сапога́х)
- 1982 Once Upon a Dog (Жил-был пёс)
- 1983 Cheburashka Goes to School (Чебура́шка идёт в шко́лу)
- 1984 The Tale of Tsar Saltan (Ска́зка о царе́ Салта́не)
- 1985 Two Tickets to India (Два билета в Индию)
- 1987 Laughter and Grief by the White Sea (Смех и го́ре у Бе́ла мо́ря)
- 1988 Mountain Pass (Перева́л)
- 1990 Grey Wolf and Little Red Riding Hood

== See also ==
- History of Russian animation
- Mosfilm and Experimental creative association
- Gorky Film Studio
- Lenfilm
- South-Siberian Film Studio
- Sverdlovsk Film Studio
- Lendoc
- Central Studio for Documentary Film
- Soyuzsportfilm
- Lennauchfilm
- Toonbox, Pilot & Melnitsa Animation Studio
- Encyclopedia of Domestic Animation – covering all Soviet and Russian animation
