= The Golden Antelope =

- Russian: Золотая антилопа
- Directed by: Lev Atamanov
- Story by: Nikolai Abramov; Nikolai Erdman
- Based on: Indian folktale motifs
- Produced by: Aleksandr Vinokurov; Leonid Shvartsman
- Cinematography: Mikhail Druyan
- Edited by: Lidiya Kyaksht
- Music by: Vladimir Mikhailovich Yurovsky
- Production company: Soyuzmultfilm
- Release date: 1954
- Running time: 32 minutes
- Country: Soviet Union
- Language: Russian

The Golden Antelope (Золотая антилопа, Zolotaya antilopa) is a 1954 Soviet animated film directed by Lev Atamanov. Considered a classic of Soviet animation, it is based on Indian folk motifs.

== Plot ==
A raja and his servants hunt a magical antelope that can strike gold with its hooves. A poor orphan boy hides the antelope and misleads the raja's party. The grateful antelope tells the boy where to find her when he needs help. A servant who witnessed this demands the boy reveal the antelope's location, but when he refuses, monkeys pelt the servant with coconuts, driving him away. The servant reports to the raja, who orders the boy captured. After the boy saves the servant from a tiger, the ungrateful servant has him arrested anyway. The raja demands a fine of 10 gold coins or the boy's head by sunrise.

On his journey to find the antelope, the boy saves various animals — bird chicks from a cobra, tiger cubs from a pit, and removes a spear from an elephant's foot. The grateful animals help him reach the antelope quickly. She gives him the gold and a bamboo flute to summon her, then carries him back to meet the deadline.

The raja takes the flute and summons the antelope, demanding great wealth. Despite her warning that there might be too much gold, the greedy raja insists on more. The antelope warns that if he says "enough," all gold will turn to pottery shards. She then runs through the palace, striking gold sparks. Buried under falling coins, the desperate raja cries "enough!" - and all the gold becomes worthless shards. His servants abandon him, saying they'll find another raja. The boy and antelope depart together toward the mountains.

== Voice cast ==
- Valentina Sperantova as boy
- Nina Nikitina as the antelope
- Ruben Simonov as Raja
- Aleksandr Gruzinskiy as Raja's servant

== Production ==
The film "makes considerable use of traced live-action scenes" with the human figures were recorded with the rotoscope. Leonid Shvartsman drew all the characters except the antelope, which was drawn by Natalia Stroganova, a student of the wildlife artist Vasily Vatagin. Shvartsman spent hours in the Lenin Library going through albums about India and Sikhs to create the Raja, his assistant, guards, the tiger, and the boy.

The characters, who are realistically illustrated, wear traditional Indian dress. Ruben Simonov, who voiced the Raja, wore a turban and a khalat (robe) and walked hunched over with his hands behind his back, just like his character. Shvartsman noted that Simonov brought a lot to his role—"characteristic gait, gestures, intonations."

The composer was Vladimir Mikhailovich Yurovsky and the soundtrack was played by the USSR Ministry of Culture Orchestra under the direction of Grigori Gamburg.

== Reception ==
=== Critical response ===
The film was well received both domestically and internationally. A TASS transmission reported that the film was met "with great success in the cinemas of the country. Animator Yuri Norstein commended it as an exemplary Soviet animated film that demonstrates perfect color harmony and dramaturgy and as a great achievement of animation. Fyodor Khitruk called it a masterpiece. Film critic Larisa Malyukova described it as "a true animated masterpiece", praising its "sharp, laconic dialogues and expressive characters", especially the Raja and Ruben Simonov's voicing of the Raja. Sergey Asenin similarly commended Ruben Simonov's voicing of the Raja. In 1958, its script writer Nikolai Abramov listed it among Soviet films that "stand up to the best of animated films produced anywhere." Eleanor Cowen found it overally brilliant and lavish.

=== Accolades ===
- 1955 Cannes Film Festival Short Film Special Distinction
- 1955 International Film Festival at Durban Diploma
- 1955 International Festival of Short Films in Belgrade Diploma
- 1957 First British International Film Festival in London (Festival of Festivals)

=== Legacy ===
In Russian media, it is referred to as a masterpiece and a classic of Soviet animation.

Along with The Snow Queen (1957), The Golden Antelope is considered Atamanov's best work.

In 1978, the fairy tale "The Golden Antelope" was released as a children's phonograph record.

In 2021 Moscow Mayor Sergey Sobyanin opened the "Soyuzmultpark" multimedia center at the Exhibition of Achievements of National Economy (VDNKh), featuring four interactive zones based on several Soviet animated films including The Golden Antelope, where visitors can participate in animation workshops and create their own cartoons.
