= Left-Hander (1964 film) =

- Directed by: Ivan Ivanov-Vano; Vladimir Danilevich
- Written by: Ivan Ivanov-Vano
- Narrated by: Dmitriy Zhuravlyov
- Edited by: Nina Mayorova
- Music by: Aleksandr Aleksandrov
- Release date: July 22, 1964 (USSR)
- Running time: 42 min. 23 sec.
- Country: USSR
- Language: Russian

Left-Hander (Russian: Левша́, translit. Levsha) is a 1964 feature-length cutout-animated film from the Soviet Union. The film is based on the story of the same name by the 19th century Russian novelist Nikolai Leskov. It was directed by the "Patriarch of Soviet animation", Ivan Ivanov-Vano, at the Soyuzmultfilm studio.

The score was performed by the Government Symphony Orchestra, conducted by Grigori Gamburg.

== Plot ==
The screen version of the narration of Nikolay Leskov about the surprising master Lefty who grounded a "aglitskaya" (English) steel flea.

== Creators ==
	English	Russian
Director-producer	Ivan Ivanov-Vano	Иван Иванов-Вано
Second Director (First Assistant)	Vladimir Danilevich	Владимир Данилевич
Scenario	Ivan Ivanov-Vano	Иван Иванов-Вано
Art Directors	Arkadiy Tyurin; Anatoliy Kuritsyn; Marina Sokolova	Аркадий Тюрин; Анатолий Курицын; Марина Соколова
Artists	Vladimir Alisov; G. Zuykova; V. Rodzhero; Vladimir Sobolev; A. Volkov; G. Nevzorova; Aleksandr Gorbachyov	Владимир Алисов; Г. Зуйкова; В. Роджеро; Владимир Соболев; А. Волков; Г. Невзорова; Александр Горбачёв
Animators	Galina Zolotovskaya; Yuriy Norshteyn; Lev Zhdanov; Kirill Malyantovich; Mikhail Botov	Галина Золотовская; Юрий Норштейн; Лев Жданов; Кирилл Малянтович; Михаил Ботов
Camera Operator	Joseph Golomb	Иосиф Голомб
Executive Producer	Nathan Bitman	Натан Битман
Composer	Aleksandr Aleksandrov	Александр Александров
Sound Operator	Boris Filchikov	Борис Фильчиков
Script Editor	Natalya Abramova	Наталья Абрамова
Puppets and decorations	Vladimir Abbakumov; N. Budylova; Vera Cherkinskaya; Svetlana Znamenskaya; Liliana Lyutinskaya; Y. Benkevich; Oleg Masainov; M. Spasskaya	Владимир Аббакумов; Н. Будылова; Вера Черкинская; Светлана Знаменская; Лилиана Лютинская; Ю. Бенкевич; Олег Масаинов; М. Спасская
Narrator	Dmitriy Zhuravlyov	Дмитрий Журавлёв
Editor	Nina Mayorova	Нина Майорова

== Awards ==
- 1964 — the Honourable diploma at the VII International film festival short and documentaries in Leipzig.

== Video ==
In 2008 was issued together with animated films "The Humpbacked Horse" 1947 and 1975 on DVD the Krupnyy Plan company.

== Creation history ==
Ivanov-Vano bore an animated film plan about the gifted master in Leskov's story about 30 years. Over time he arrived at idea that the originality of the narration of Leskov can be transferred, having created a graphic row with a support on an art system of the Russian popular print with "its characteristic generality of forms, specific expressiveness". For animation the idea to show evolution of character of the main character was innovative. Art directors at creation of the movie were inspired by ancient engravings (action in the imperial palace), English engravings (the foreign line), and the Tula episodes were solved in the stylistics of a popular print which is organically uniting all three lines. According to the proposal of the animator of "Lefty" Yury Norstein, the movie became in equipment of a turn.

== See also ==
- History of Russian animation
- List of animated feature films
- List of stop-motion films
