= Black and White (1932 film) =

1932 film

- Directed by: Ivan Ivanov-Vano, Leonid Amalrik
- Written by: Vladimir Mayakovsky (based on his poem), Iosif Sklyut
- Music by: German Hamburg
- Animation by: A. Bergengrin, E. Felzer, K. Malyshev, Erich Wilhelm Steiger
- Production company: Mezhrabpomfilm
- Release date: 1932
- Running time: 7 minutes
- Country: Soviet Union

Black and White is a 1932 Soviet animated short film directed by Ivan Ivanov-Vano and Leonid Amalrik. Based on the poem of the same name written By Vladimir Maykovsky, the text is narrated by Konstantin Eggert.

== Plot ==
The cartoon deals with the racism prevalent in the sugar industry of the American South and the cruel treatment of Black workers. It shows people working in the fields, walking in chains, sitting behind bars, and being executed in the electric chair. In most scenes, a white man is whipping or guarding workers. The protagonist, Willie, a shoeshiner asks a wealthy white man:

Why must
sugar —
so white —
be made
by a black man?

and suggests that the man do it himself, for which he receives a blow to the face. The cartoon ends with a view of Lenin’s mausoleum and the call: “Workers of all countries and oppressed peoples of the world, unite!”

The soundtrack of the film is the traditional Black spiritual Sometimes I Feel like a Motherless Child sung by Paul Robeson.

== Aesthetic approach ==
Stylistically the animated short, like many other European animated films, places emphasis the communication of ideas and messages; a direct contrast to the style favored by Disney, which sought to "create relatable characters with expressive personalities and attitudes."

== See also ==
- Russian animation
- Soviet cinema
