= The Nutcracker (1973 film) =

- Directed by: Boris Stepantsev
- Written by: Boris Stepantsev; Boris Larin
- Based on: The Nutcracker by Pyotr Ilyich Tchaikovsky and The Nutcracker and the Mouse King by E. T. A. Hoffmann
- Produced by: Bernard Sofronski
- Music by: Pyotr Ilyich Tchaikovsky
- Release date: 1973
- Running time: 27 minutes
- Country: Soviet Union

The Nutcracker (Russian: Щелкунчик, transcribed as Shchelkunchik) is a 1973 Soviet/Russian animated film from the Soyuzmultfilm studio directed by Boris Stepantsev and based partly on Pyotr Tchaikovsky's 1892 ballet The Nutcracker, but more closely on E.T.A. Hoffmann's 1816 short story "The Nutcracker and the Mouse King" which inspired the ballet.

== Plot ==
During the opening credits, a mouse soldier is climbing around a Christmas tree with a light. When it spots a nutcracker hanging from one of the branches, it hastily retreats back into its mousehole.

The first scene is a Christmas party where numerous children are celebrating. The female protagonist, an unnamed girl who works as a maid at the household, watches the children frolicking around. A boy begins using a nutcracker to crack nuts, but he is quite brutal with it and eventually leaves the nutcracker with a nut stuck in its mouth. When the party is over late at night, the girl comes down to the hall for cleaning, but the night is full with magic, which manifests firstly in the maid's broom animating and dancing with her. She eventually finds the nutcracker on the floor. When she kisses him, he comes to life and is devastated when he sees what he has become. It is then and when the Nutcracker decides to tell the girl his story of how he came to be as he is:

A long time ago, there was a party at a royal castle to celebrate the prince's birthday, which was interrupted by the arrival of the three-headed Mouse Queen and her spoiled brat son, the Mouse Prince, who both behaved very rudely and refused to leave or improve their manners. The king attempted to get rid of them, first by sending his guards who the Mouse Queen freezes with her magic, and then with his sword which the Mouse Queen eats. In exasperation, the king entered a secret chamber to obtain a poison against the Mouse Queen, but was locked in by the Mouse Prince. The Mouse Prince then started harassing the human queen, to which the human prince retaliated by hitting him in the head with his sword, then his tail got stuck under the cradle and was hurt. In revenge for her son, the Mouse Queen attacked the human prince with her magic, but the king was able to arrive and vanquish the Mouse Queen, but her tail remained to curse the baby prince, turning him into a Nutcracker. The king and queen were devastated, and they along with the entire hall was petrified in ice while the Mouse Prince escaped, taking his mother's crown with him, and he declared revenge on the Nutcracker. Eventually, the Nutcracker came to be hanged as an ornament on the Christmas tree within this house.

Just after the Nutcracker has finished his story, mice soldiers begin to appear in the hall, followed by the Mouse Queen's son, now the Mouse King. The soldiers try to get the Nutcracker, but the girl stops them, leading the Mouse King to shrink and capture her. The Nutcracker brings the toys around the Christmas tree to life, and a war is fought between the toys and mice. The Nutcracker's army was successful in rescuing the girl, but the Mouse King used his magic to render them inanimate again. The Nutcracker is captured, bound and about to be whipped to pieces by the Mouse King when the girl throws her wooden clog at him, knocking off and smashing the iron crown, the source of the Mouse King's powers. The Mouse King's magic backfires, making him vanish in a puff of green smoke which also decimates his army the moment they inhale it and start sneezing.

The clog transforms into a glittering shoe. When the Nutcracker takes up the shoe, his shell falls away and he is restored to his human (and now young adult) self. He puts the shoe on the girl's foot, and her maid's uniform is transformed into a princess gown. The two dance to the royal castle to the music of the Dance of the Sugar Plum Fairy; the king and queen are brought back to life through the Waltz of the Flowers, and the girl and the prince pass into the realm. All that is left behind of them in the human world are the girl's wooden clogs and the crumbled remains of the Nutcracker's shell lying before the Christmas tree.

== Production notes ==
Ballet dancer Mikhail Baryshnikov, who himself starred in his own classic TV edition of The Nutcracker in 1977, included the 1973 animated film as part of his PBS series Stories from my Childhood, of which he was the executive producer.

There is no dialogue in the film, except for a few "chipmunk"-like squeals when the mice vanish and the squeals and laughter of the children in the party sequence. The music is taken from several of Tchaikovsky's compositions aside from The Nutcracker, including The Russian Dance, Swan Lake and The Sleeping Beauty. For the U.S. telecast, narration spoken first by Hans Conried and later by Shirley MacLaine (which was done for the Mikhail Baryshnikov Stories from my Childhood version) was added as well as a version without any narration.
