= Lev Atamanov =

Soviet animation director (1905–1981)

- Born: Levon Konstantinovich Atamanyan; 21 February [O.S. 8 February] 1905; Moscow, Russian Empire
- Died: 12 February 1981 (aged 75); Moscow, Soviet Union
- Occupation: Animation film director of Soyuzmultfilm

Lev Konstantinovich Atamanov (Russian: Лев Константи́нович Атама́нов), born Levon Konstantinovich Atamanyan (Russian: Лево́н Константи́нович Атаманя́н, Armenian: Լևոն Ատամանյան; 21 February [O.S. 8 February] 1905 – 12 February 1981), was a Soviet Armenian animation director.

Atamanov was one of the foremost Soviet animation film directors and one of the founders of Soviet animation art. He is the director of famous classics of Soviet animation, such as the prize-winning fairy tales Scarlet Flower (1952), The Golden Antelope (1954), the full-length animation The Snow Queen (1957), and the modern satirical tale The Key (1961). In his works Lev Atamanov subtly conveyed the national coloring of fairy tales and combined romantic elation in images of positive characters with warm and kind humor.

== Life and career ==
Levon Konstantinovich Atamanyan was born in Moscow into an Armenian family hailing from Nakhichevan-on-Don. Atamanov studied acting and directing with Lev Kuleshov at the Gerasimov Institute of Cinematography, graduating in 1926. Atamanov first worked as an assistant to the painter and animator Yuri Merkulov and later joined Mezhrabpomfilm Studio. Atamanov’s debut was the short public service announcement Across the Street (1931, with Vladimir Suteev), which explained traffic rules. He then made one of the first animated sound pictures, The Tale of the Little White Bull (1933), an allegorical anti-Western pamphlet directed against the League of Nations.

In 1936 Atamanov moved to Yerevan where at Armenfilm Studio he directed the first Armenian animated films, Dog and Cat (1938), from a fairy tale by Hovhannes Tumanyan, and The Priest and the Goat (1941). During the Great Patriotic War, Atamanov served in the Red Army. After his discharge, he completed one more animated film in Armenia, The Magic Carpet (1948). He then returned to Moscow and joined Soyuzmultfilm studio. Atamanov’s animated features; The Golden Antelope (1954) from Indian fairy tales and The Snow Queen (1957) from Hans Christian Andersen’s tale proved to be successful domestically and internationally. He later tried out a variety of styles and topics, among them political satire, for example, in That’s in Our Power (1970), from caricatures of Danish Communist cartoonist Herluf Bidstrup, who was popular in the Soviet Union. He also directed The Scarlet Flower as a plea against Soviet antisemitism.

He was buried at the Moscow Armenian Cemetery.

== Recognition and legacy ==
Atamanov was one of the most respected Soviet animators and is regarded as one of the greatest artists in the history of animation. He was named People’s Artist of the RSFSR in 1978.

Hayao Miyazaki has cited Atamanov's 1957 film The Snow Queen as a seminal influence on his work and his favorite film.

In 2023 a commemorative star dedicated to Atamanov was placed in the walk of fame alley located at Charles Aznavour Square in Yerevan, Armenia.

== Filmography ==
- The story about the white bull-calf (1933)
- The Blot in the Arctic (1934)
- Blot-barber (1935)
- The dog and the cat (1938)
- The priest and the goat (1941)
- The magic carpet (1948)
- The yellow stork (1950) - the first work at Soyuzmultfilm studio
- The Scarlet Flower (1952)
- The Golden Antelope (1954)
- The dog and the cat (1955) - a remake of the version of 1938
- The Snow Queen (1957)
- Roads of spring (1959)
- The thieves of paints (1959)
- The Key (1961)
- The fairy tales about another's paints (1962)
- Jokes (1963)
- The shepherdess and the chimney sweep (1965)
- The bouquet (1966)
- The bench (1967)
- The fence (1967) Kaleidoscope-68
- The cyclist (1968) Kaleidoscope-68
- The ballerina by the ship (1969)
- It in our forces (1970)
- Confusion (collection) (1971)
- Petrushka (1971)
- Above head! (1972)
- The short stories about the space (1973)
- The pony runs in round (1974)
- I remember … (1975)
- The kitten by the name of Bark (1976) (release 1)
- The kitten by the name of Bark (1977) (release 2)
- The kitten by the name of Bark (1979) (release 3)
- The kitten by the name of Bark (1980) (release 4)

== See also ==
- Aleksandr Ptushko
- Ivan Ivanov-Vano
- Alexander Rou
