= Ruben Simonov =

Soviet actor, theatre and film director

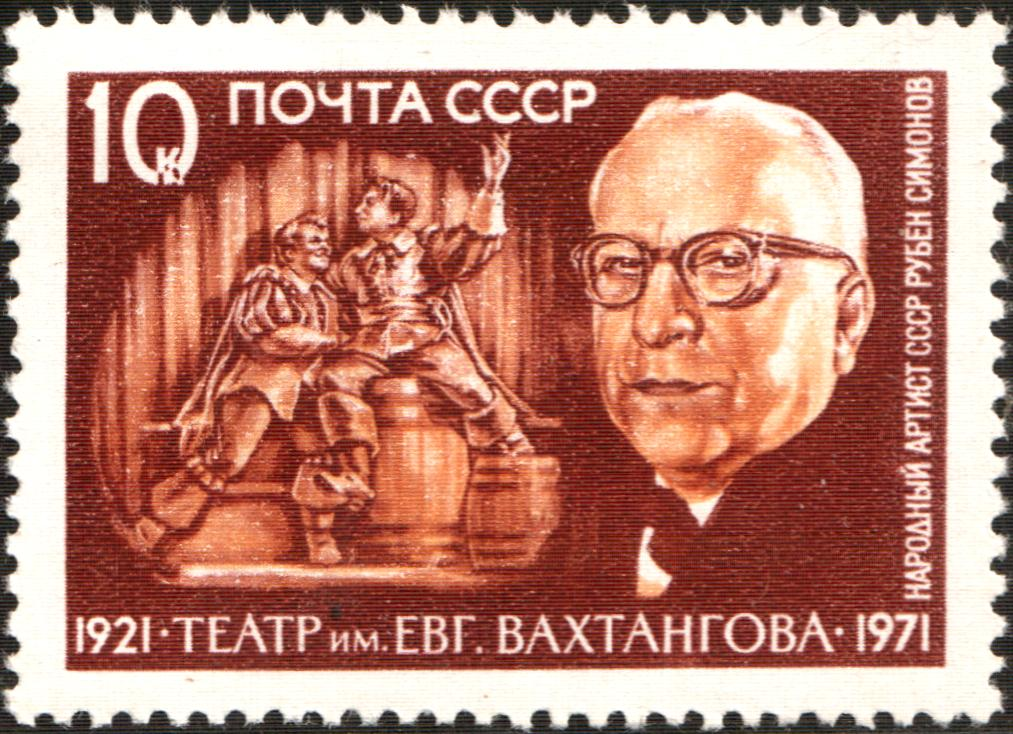
- Simonov on a 1971 Soviet stamp
- Born: Ruben Nikolayevich Simonyants; 2 April 1899; Moscow, Russian Empire
- Died: 5 December 1968 (aged 69); Moscow, Russian SFSR, Soviet Union
- Occupations: Actor; theater director; pedagogue
- Years active: 1919–1968

Ruben Nikolayevich Simonov (Russian: Рубен Николаевич Симонов, Armenian: Ռուբեն Նիկոլայի Սիմոնով; 2 April 1899 – 5 December 1968) was a Soviet actor, theater director, and pedagogue, People's Artist of the USSR (1946).

== Biography ==
Simonov was born in Moscow, to a family of Russian Armenians. Graduating from the Moscow State University, he then became an actor, starting his career at the Armenian drama studio in the Armenian House of Culture. In 1939, he became director of the Vakhtangov Theatre. He also led the Armenian and Uzbek theaters of Moscow.

== Selected filmography ==
- Admiral Nakhimov (1946) as Osman Pasha
- The Fall of Berlin (1950) as Anastas Mikoyan
- The Golden Antelope (1954) as Raja (voice)
- The Gadfly (1955) as Cardi

== Awards and honors ==
- Honored Artist of the RSFSR (1933)
- People's Artist of the RSFSR (1937)
- Three Orders of Lenin (1939, 1946, 1967)
- Two Stalin Prizes first degree (1943, 1947)
- Stalin Prizes second degree (1950)
- People's Artist of the USSR (1946)
- Two Orders of the Red Banner of Labour (1946, 1959)
- Lenin Prize (1967)
- Medal "For Valiant Labour in the Great Patriotic War 1941–1945"
- Medal "In Commemoration of the 800th Anniversary of Moscow"
