= Roman Davydov =

Russian animator (1913–1988)

- Born: Roman Vladimirovich Davydov; 9 April 1913; Moscow, Russian Empire
- Died: 17 September 1988 (aged 75); Moscow, Soviet Union
- Occupations: Animator, artist

Roman Vladimirovich Davydov (Russian: Роман Владимирович Давыдов; 9 April [O.S. 27 March] 1913 – 17 September 1988) was a Soviet and Russian animation director, animator, artist and educator. Honoured Worker of the Arts Industry of the RSFSR (1979).

== Biography ==
Roman Davydov was born in Moscow. As a kid he grew up in a house with stables; he watched horses for hours and drew them. His love for animal art and his knowledge of anatomy would later make him one of the most wanted animators every time someone directed movies involving animals, especially horses. According to Yevgeniy Migunov, only two other animators at Soyuzmultfilm could match him: Grigory Kozlov and Nikolay Fyodorov, both with their own approaches, and they always tried to best each other.

Davydov graduated from the Moscow Industrial Technikum and spent several years working as an engineer. In the free time he practiced the art of caricature. In 1932 the Telegraph Agency of the Soviet Union held out a competition for the best caricature where Davydov took the third place. This inspired him to go through professional training at the two-year courses organized by the Krokodil magazine, and in 1937 he joined animation courses at Soyuzmultfilm. His first movies date back to 1939.

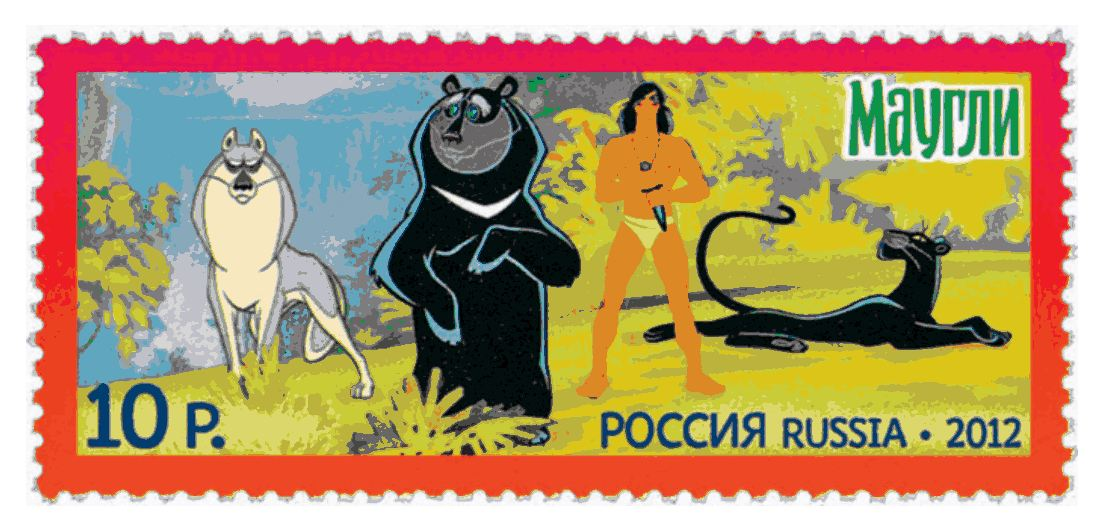
Adventures of Mowgli on a stamp

He worked in traditional animation up until 1955 when he joined the recently opened puppet division of Soyuzmultfilm and produced several stop motion films. He was the only director of that time who used an old-fashioned, time-consuming method of filming dolls with changeable parts last practiced by Aleksandr Ptushko. In 1961 Davydov produced A Goatling, one of the first traditionally animated experiments of the Khrushchev thaw that introduced a "formalistic", caricature art style in contrast with the realistic approach usual for that era. He continued developing it in his next projects, most notably the political satire Shareholders & Co (1963) and The Main Stellar (1966), a rare example of Soviet science fiction. Davydov experimented a lot with schematic, "angular", yet stylized characters, total animation, combinations of static composition and various details in motion, several panoramas moving at different speed in one shot and so on.

From 1967 to 1971 he directed his most famous work: the Adventures of Mowgli mini-series adapted from Rudyard Kipling's two Jungle Books. It consisted of five 20-minute episodes released yearly, and in 1973 they were combined into a feature film. The first episode was developed and released simultaneously with The Jungle Book by Disney and featured completely different style and mood. Made as a close adaptation of Kipling's writings, it allowed Davydov for a detailed study of the Indian wildlife and a mature storyline that featured a number of violent scenes, including the epic battle with red dogs from The Second Jungle Book (some critics linked it to the history of the Soviet Union).

Roman Davydov was also known for his Russian nationalism among colleagues. His film crews consisted almost exclusively of ethnic Russian animators and art directors (most commonly of Aleksandr Vinokurov, Pyotr Repkin and Viktor Nikitin), and after Mowgli he switched to adaptations of Russian historical events and folklore. Among them were Ratibor's Childhood (1973) based on the historical novel Primordial Rus' by Valentin Ivanov about the life of the East Slavs during the 6th century; Vasilisa Mikulishna (1975) that featured two bylina heroes: Stavr Godinovich and his wife Vasilisa Mikulishna, daughter of Mikula Selyaninovich; The Swans of Nepryadva (1980) dedicated to 600 years since the Battle of Kulikovo and A Tale of Evpaty Kolovrat (1985) about another medieval bogatyr, Evpaty Kolovrat. His last unfinished film was called A Letter from the XIII Century.

Apart from the work at Soyuzmultfilm Davydov also illustrated children's books based on his own films and led training courses for animators. He was also a member of ASIFA.

Roman Davydov died in 1988 after surviving a stroke and a heart attack. His son Aleksandr Davydov (25 January 1937 — 20 November 2012) was also a prominent Russian animator and animation director.

== Filmography ==
=== Director ===
- 1948 — A Hunting Gun (with Panteleymon Sazonov, also animator)
- 1955 — Ballad of a Table (with Mikhail Kalinin, also art director)
- 1956 — Kolobok (also art director)
- 1958 — Three Bears
- 1961 — A Goatling
- 1961 — Hail to You, Sky Brothers! (with Ivan Aksenchuk)
- 1962 — Living Numbers
- 1963 — Shareholders & Co
- 1964 — At the Edge of Mystery
- 1965 — Gunan-Bator
- 1966 — The Main Stellar
- 1967-1971 — Adventures of Mowgli (also animator)
- 1968 — Fitil № 69 (Proprietor episode)
- 1972 — Foka — Versatile Worker
- 1973 — Ratibor's Childhood
- 1973 — Who Pushed Me?
- 1975 — Vasilisa Mikulishna
- 1976 — Slashing Fellow
- 1977 — Tom Thumb (with Aleksandr Trusov)
- 1978 — The Last Bride of Zmey Gorynych
- 1980 — The Swans of Nepryadva
- 1982 — The Son of Stone
- 1983 — A Hunter and His Son
- 1983 — A Tablet
- 1985 — A Tale of Evpaty Kolovrat
- 1986 — The Son of Stone and a Giant

=== Animator ===
- 1939 — War Chronicles
- 1939 — Limpopo
- 1940 — And We Are Out to Olympics
- 1940 — Ivas'
- 1941 — Barmalei
- 1941 — Fly-Clatterfly
- 1942 — Fox, Hare and Rooster
- 1943 — Stolen Sun
- 1943 — The Tale of Tsar Saltan
- 1944 — Musical Joke
- 1944 — Telephone
- 1945 — Winter Tale
- 1945 — The Lost Letter
- 1945 — Teremok
- 1946 — The Song of Happiness
- 1947 — The Little Humpbacked Horse
- 1947 — Merry Garden
- 1947 — Quartet
- 1948 — Grey Neck
- 1949 — Miraculous Bell
- 1950 — The Tale of the Fisherman and the Fish
- 1950 — Magic Treasure
- 1950 — When New Year Trees Light Up
- 1950 — Deer and Wolf
- 1950 — Wonder Mill
- 1951 — The Night Before Christmas
- 1951 — Forest Adventurers
- 1951 — Brave Heart
- 1952 — The Scarlet Flower
- 1952 — Validub
- 1952 — Kashtanka
- 1952 — Sarmiko
- 1952 — The Snow Maiden
- 1953 — Magic Bird
- 1953 — Painted Fox
- 1953 — Flight to the Moon
- 1953 — Sister Alyonushka and Brother Ivanushka
- 1954 — The Golden Antelope
- 1954 — Dangerous Prank
- 1954 — Illegible Signature
- 1954 — Straw Bullock
- 1955 — Island of Mistakes
- 1955 — Dog and Cat
- 1955 — Golden Comb Rooster
- 1955 — Snowman-Postman
- 1955 — Brave Hare
- 1956 — Divinity
- 1957 — Familiar Pictures
- 1958 — Golden Wheats
- 1959 — It Will Rain Soon

== Awards and honours ==
- Honoured Worker of the Arts Industry of the RSFSR (1979)
- Order of the Red Banner of Labour (1986)

== See also ==
- History of Russian animation
