= Grigori Gamburg =

Russian conductor and composer (1900–1967)

Grigori (German) Semyonovich Gamburg (Russian: Григорий (Герман) Семёнович Гамбург; 22 October [O.S. 9 October] 1900, Warsaw – 28 October 1967, Moscow) was a Soviet and Russian conductor, composer, violist and violinist.

Gamburg graduated from the Tiflis Conservatory (now the Tbilisi State Conservatoire) in 1922 studying composition with Nikolai Tcherepnin and violin with V.R. Vilshau (В.Р. Вильшау), and graduated in 1927 from the Moscow Conservatory studying composition with Nikolai Myaskovsky, violin with Boris Sibor (Борис Осипович Сибор), and conducting with Nicolai Malko. Gamburg did postgraduate studies in chamber music, and taught chamber music classes at the Moscow Conservatory from 1928 to 1941, becoming Professor of Chamber Music in 1939. From 1924 to 1930 he was violist with the Stradivari Quartet (of Moscow).

From the early 1930s, Gamburg was conductor of the Radio Symphony Orchestra, and of the Orchestra of the Ministry of Cinematography of the USSR where he was musical director for many Russian-language films.

From 1945 to 1954 Gamburg was professor of conducting at the Institute of Military Conductors (Институт Военных Дирижеров), and professor of chamber music at the Gnesin Academy of Music from 1954.

Gamburg was awarded the honorary title of Honoured Worker of the Arts Industry of the RSFSR in 1965.

== Selected works ==
Orchestral

- Salavat Yulayev (Салават Юлаев), Overture-Fantasy on Bashkir Themes (1941); based on Salawat Yulayev
- Suite on Yakutian Themes (Сюита на якутские темы) (1945)
- Overture on Three Russian Songs (Увертюра на темы три русских песен) (1947)
- Lyrical Poem (Лирическая поэма) (1947)

Concertante

- Concerto No. 1 for violin and orchestra (1927)
- Concerto No. 1 for cello and orchestra (1939)
- Concerto for viola and orchestra (1943)
- Concerto No. 2 for cello and orchestra (1944)
- Concerto No. 2 for violin and orchestra (1953)

Chamber music

- 2 Tunes from the "Song of Songs" (2 Pieces; Два напева из «Песни Песней»; Zwei Fragmente "Aus dem Hohen Lied") for viola and piano, Op. 5 (1928)
- String Quartet No. 1, Op. 8 (1929)
- String Quartet No. 2, Op. 10 (1934)
- 2 Pieces (Две пьесы; Deux pièces) for violin and piano (1938)

1. Reminiscence (Воспоминание)
2. Scherzo (Скерцо)

- String Quartet No. 3
- String Quartet No. 4 "Quartet-Suite" (Квартет-сюита)
- String Quartet No. 5 for 4 cellos
- String Trio (1946)
- Theme and Variations (Тема с вариациями) for cello and piano (1948)

Film works as conductor

- The Little Humpbacked Horse (1947)
- They Have a Motherland (1949)
- The Great Warrior Skanderbeg (1953)
- Mysterious Discovery (1953)
- The Golden Antelope (1954)
- The Drummer's Fate (1955)
- Smoke in the Forest (1955)
- Othello (1955)
- For the Power of the Soviets (1956)
- It Happened in Penkovo (1957)
- The Height (1957)
- The House I Live In (1957)
- Over Tissa (1958)
- Volunteers (1958)
- Vasily Surikov (1959)
- The Unamenables (1959)
- Chronicle of Flaming Years (1960)
- Russian Souvenir (1960)
- When the Trees Were Tall (1961)
- Peace to Him Who Enters (1961)
- Shore Leave (1962; together with Emin Khachaturian)
- Introduction to Life (1963)
- Left-Hander (1964)
- Man without a Passport (1966)

== Discography ==
- Jewish Chamber Music – Tabea Zimmermann (viola); Jasha Nemtsov (piano); Hänssler Classic CD 93.008 (2000)

From the "Song of Songs", Op. 5

- Praise the Lord! (Игрой на струнах хвалите Господа!) – Svetlana Stepchenko (viola); Zoya Abolitz (piano); Art Classics (2003)

2 Tunes from the "Song of Songs" (Два напева из «Песни Песней»), Op. 5

== Sources ==
- Биография: Гамбург Григорий (Герман) Семенович (in Russian) Retrieved 11 October 2010.
- Academic Dictionaries and Encyclopedias (in Russian) Retrieved 12 October 2010.
