= Leonid Amalrik =

Soviet animator and animation director

- Born: Leonid Alekseyevich Amalrik; 8 July 1905; Moscow, Russian Empire
- Died: 22 October 1997 (aged 92); Moscow, Russia
- Occupations: Animation director, animator
- Years active: 1928–1971

Leonid Alekseyevich Amalrik (Russian: Леони́д Алексе́евич Ама́льрик; 8 July [O.S. 25 June] 1905 — 22 October 1997) was a Soviet animation director and animator. Honoured Worker of the Arts Industry of the RSFSR (1965).

== Biography ==
=== Early years ===
Leonid was born to Anna Mikhailovna and Aleksey Ivanovich Amalrik, an employee and later an inspector at the Russia insurance company, a distinguished citizen of Moscow. His paternal great-grandfather Jean Amalric emigrated to Russia from Avignon, France during the 19th century and founded a lace manufactory, but later burned it down during his alcoholic intoxication; both Amalric and his wife were killed in fire, only their 4-year-old son also named Jean survived. He was raised by the French colony in Moscow as Ivan Ivanovich Amalrik and later joined the Albert Hübner's Calico Manufactory. He was married to the daughter of the Moscow 1st class merchant Sergei Belkin from Old Believers. Among their children was Sergei Amalrik, grandfather of the Soviet writer and dissident Andrei Amalrik, and Aleksey Amalrik, father of Leonid.

Amalrik grew up in a wealthy family at the Arbat District in the center of Moscow. At the age of seven he had to spend several months in bed following the appendectomy. During that time he started drawing and became addicted to it. He would later direct a part-autobiographical film A Girl and an Elephant (1969) based on Aleksandr Kuprin's story as well as his childhood memories. In 1925 he entered the State College of Cinema to study for a set decorator. From 1926 to 1928 he worked at Mezhrabpom-Rus as a scene painter assistant under Abram Room, Sergei Eisenstein and Vsevolod Pudovkin.

=== Career ===
Black and White (1932)

In 1928 he graduated from college and joined the Gosvoenkino studio as animator along with Yuri Merkulov and Lev Atamanov. Their biggest project was The First Cavalry (1929), a live-action animated film dedicated to the 1st Cavalry Army where Amalrik animated a large military map and invented a number of original techniques in the process such as a combination of stop motion and cutout animation. The movie remained one of the Soviet box office leaders for several years. In 1930 he returned to Mezhrabpomfilm where he co-directed his first traditionally animated short Black and White (1932) with Ivan Ivanov-Vano. It was based on the satirical poem by Vladimir Mayakovsky and addresses issues of American racism in Cuba. After that he was visited by the secret police who questioned him and searched his flat. The director himself explained it as a result of his radical formalistic "anti-Disney" vision and some featured themes that seemed suspicious to them. In 1935 he moved to Mosfilm, and in a year the animation department was transformed into Soyuzmultfilm.

Limpopo (1939)

For the first few years Amalrik along with other animators focused on Disney-styled films, though he didn't tolerate them. Since 1938 he had been actively working in the genre of political satire that allowed for more artistic freedom. In 1939 he joined forces with Vladimir Polkovnikov, and together they directed a trilogy Limpopo (1939), Barmaley (1941) and Peacock's Tail (1946) based on the Doctor Aybolit fairy tales, all shot in full color using the three-color filming process by Pavel Mershin (the color copies of the first two shorts are considered to be lost). It was one of the first Soviet mini-series and among the first distinctive pictures of Soyuzmultfilm that defined the "Soviet style" of animation.

During their work on Barmaley Polkovnikov was enrolled to the army and Amalrik finished it on his own, yet after the war they continued working as a team until 1953. Their most famous work The Grey Neck (1948) based on the tale by Dmitry Mamin-Sibiryak received several awards at international film festivals, including the IV Film Festival in Mariánské Lázně.

Kino-Circus (1942)

With the start of the Great Patriotic War he stayed in Moscow. In July 1941 his house was destroyed by a bomb during the Nazi bombing of the city. His family survived by a chance, but remained homeless until Korney Chukovsky learned about it and helped them get a new flat. During the first month of war Amalrik gathered a group of those few animators left in the city, including Olga and Nikolai Khodataev, and they produced several anti-Hitler sketches that were released under the Kino-Circus name in 1942. Soon after he was sent to the frontline and ended up in a hospital. He also worked at the Voenttechfilm studio.

Since 1954 he had been directing films on his own. Many of them were adaptations of fairy tales written by his long-time friend Vladimir Suteev, as well as satirical tales by Sergey Mikhalkov aimed at children and adults. In 1958 he directed The Cat's House, "an animated opera parody" based on the fairy tale in verse by Samuil Marshak with the score written by Nikita Bogoslovsky. It was awarded the first prize at the X International Film Festival for Children and Youth in Venice. Among his most popular and quatable works was Thumbelina (1964), an adaptation of Hans Christian Andersen's fairy tale. His last film was Terem-Teremok (1971). After that he left the industry.

Leonid Amalrik died in Moscow on 22 October 1997. He was buried at the Pyatnitskoye Cemetery. His wife Nadezhda Mikhailovna Privalova, an artist, worked with him on many of his films.

== Films ==
- 1932 — Black and White (with Ivan Ivanov-Vano)
- 1936 — Kolobok (with Vladimir Suteev)
- 1938 — Politsatire Journal № 1 (one of the sketches, lost)
- 1939 — Limpopo (with Vladimir Polkovnikov)
- 1939 — Victorious Route (with Dmitry Babchenko and Vladimir Polkovnikov)
- 1941 — Barmaley (with Vladimir Polkovnikov)
- 1942 — Kino-Circus (with Olga Khodataeva)
- 1946 — Peacock's Tail (with Vladimir Polkovnikov)
- 1948 — Grey Neck (with Vladimir Polkovnikov)
- 1950 — Sturdy Fellow (with Vladimir Polkovnikov)
- 1951 — High Hill (with Vladimir Polkovnikov)
- 1953 — Magic Shop (with Vladimir Polkovnikov)
- 1954 — An Arrow Flies into a Fairy Tale
- 1955 — Postman Snowman
- 1956 — Little Ship
- 1958 — The Cat's House
- 1959 — Three Lumberjacks
- 1960 — Different Wheels
- 1960 — Non-Drinking Sparrow. A Tale for Adults
- 1961 — Family Chronicles
- 1962 — Two Fairy Tales
- 1963 — Grandmother's Goatling. A Tale for Adults
- 1964 — Thumbelina
- 1966 — About a Hippo Who Was Afraid of Vaccinations
- 1967 — Fairy Tales for Big and Small
- 1968 — I Want to Horn!
- 1969 — A Girl and an Elephant
- 1971 — Terem-Teremok

== See also ==
- History of Russian animation
