= Nikolay Serebryakov =

Nikolay Nikolayevich Serebryakov (Russian: Николай Николаевич Серебряков; 14 December 1928 in Leningrad – 9 August 2005 in Moscow) was a Soviet and Russian director of animated films and a People's Artist of Russia (1996). He was married twice; first, he married Nadia Speshnayova, but she died on April 19, 1984. He then married her sister Alina Speshnayova. He had one child with her.
