= Vladimir Suteev =

Russian painter

Vladimir Grigorevich Suteev
- Born: 5 July 1903; Moscow, Russian Empire
- Died: 10 March 1993 (aged 89); Moscow, Russia
- Writing career
- Language: Russian
- Genres: Children's literature, animation
- Subjects: illustrator, author, animator
- Notable works: Who said "Meow"?, Pif-puppy

Vladimir Grigorevich Suteev (Russian: Владимир Григорьевич Сутеев) (5 July 1903 – 10 March 1993) was a Russian author, artist and animator who primarily wrote stories for children. He was among the founders of the Soviet animation industry.

Suteev's books have been translated into 36 languages and published in countries such as Norway, France, Mexico, Yugoslavia, Czechoslovakia, India and Japan.

== Early years ==
Vladimir Suteev was born in Moscow into the family of Zinaida Vasilievna Suteeva and Grigory Osipovich Suteev (1879–1960), a prominent Russian physician, dermatologist, mycologist, one of the leading actinomycosis researches who served as the head of the venereology section at the Moscow Department of Healthcare during the Soviet days. A graduate of the Imperial Moscow University, Grigory Suteev was also practicing painting and music, performing with concerts at the Assembly of the Nobility.

All this influenced Vladimir, but it was Stepan Erzia, a close family friend who made the greatest impact on him. His mother posed for Erzia, and his father left many biographical notes about his friend that were published as a Sculpture Erza book after Suteev's death.

Even as a young man, Suteev's works were periodically published in the magazines Pioner, Murzilka, Druzhnye Rebyata, and Iskorka and in the newspaper Pionerskaya Pravda. He came to children's literature from cinema. In 1928 he graduated from the Faculty of Art of the Institute of Cinematography where he studied along with his brother Vyacheslav Suteev (1904–1993) and his cousin Dmitry Bogolepov (1903–1990), both of whom became prominent Soviet popular science directors.

== Career ==
While still a student, he made drawings for China in Flames (1925), one of the earliest Soviet cutout animated films made in support of the Chinese national liberation movement. Noted for a variety of styles contributed by various young animators, including Nikolai Khodataev, Yuri Merkulov, Ivan Ivanov-Vano and the Brumberg sisters, it also became one of the world's first animated feature films: with 1000 meters of film and 14 frames per second it ran over 50 minutes at the time.

Suteev made his director's debut with the first Soviet animated talkie Athwart Street (1931) and some other experimental works before joining the Soyuzmultfilm collective in 1936 where he took part in more than 30 films as a director, screenwriter and animator. Some of them (Petya and Little Red Riding Hood, The Magic Store, etc.) were rewarded with international prizes. In 1941, before leaving for the frontline, Suteev completed his work on the cartoon Clatterfly (Mukha-tsokotukha), based on Korney Chukovsky's fairy tale.

Suteev took part in the Great Patriotic War from the first days till the very end. He then returned to Soyuzmultfilm, but left it in just two years because of his unrequited love towards Tatiana Taranovich, also an animator who joined Soyuzmultfilm in 1946. Their sad story was well-known inside the animation community. She was 13 years younger than Suteev, happily married with a daughter. According to Tatiana's granddaughter, Suteev wrote "hundreds of letters" to her, but she answered only twice. Nevertheless, 37 years later they finally married. By that time they were both widowers; Suteev turned 80, while Taranovich was 67. They lived together for 10 more years and both died in 1993.

From 1947 he worked at the Detgiz Publishing House. In 1952 his first book was published by Detgiz, Two Tales about the Pencil and the Paints. The book was welcomed by Chukovsky in a review in Literaturnaya Gazeta. After that, Suteev published quite a number of books: What Kind of a Bird is This?, Under the Mushroom, The Bag of Apples, The Chicken and the Duckling, Who said "Meow"?, The Helpful Stick, and many others. A lot of them were adapted as animated films.

Vladimir Suteev had been illustrating the books of Russian literary classics: Korney Chukovsky's tales, Samuil Marshak's "Whiskers and stripes", "Uncle Stjopa" by Sergey Mikhalkov, "The merry summer" by Valentin Berestov. Illustrated with Suteev's drawings, the below-mentioned books were published in the Soviet Union for the first time: Gianni Rodari's "Cippolino's adventures" (Suteev's heroes of the fairy-tale have become specimens for toys), the Norwegian writer Alf Prøysen's "Happy New Year", the English writer Lilian Moore "Little raccoon and the Thing in the pool". Suteev's Pif-puppy has become a favorite of children throughout the world ("The Adventures of Pif", retold from French).

== See also ==
- History of Russian animation
