= Nikolay Vorontsov =

Russian artist and illustrator from St. Petersburg

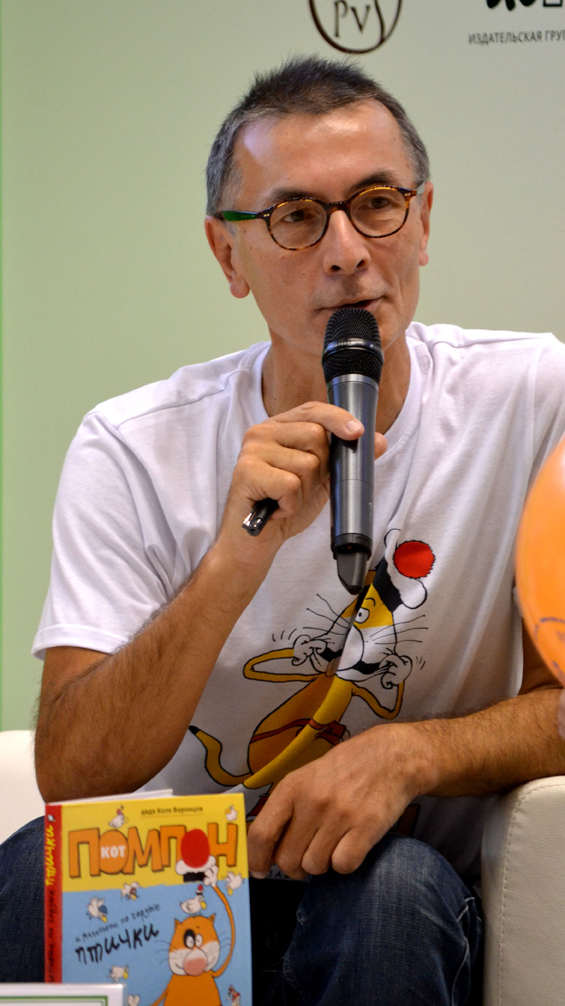
Nikolay Vorontsov presenting Cat Pompon books on Moscow Book Fair 2014

Nikolay Vorontsov (known as Uncle Kolya Vorontsov, Mikola) is a Russian artist and illustrator who lives and works in St. Petersburg.

== Biography ==
Vorontsov was born on July 1, 1959, in Petropavlovsk, Kazakhstan. From 1985 to 1991, he worked for the newspaper “Leningradskie Iskry" ("Five Corners"), during this period he also worked as a cartoonist for the newspaper “Chas Peek” (“Rush Hour”). In addition he contributed to magazines such as “Balamut,” “Bus” as well as many others.

Vorontsov is a member of the Union of Artists of Russia, and a participant and winner of numerous exhibitions of cartoons in the country and around the world – Turkey, Japan, Belgium, Bulgaria, Lithuania and Estonia.

== Works ==
Vorontsov's first book was a coloring book entitled "Tales of cat Vaska," released by Lenizdat. Other works include "Fairy Tale" by Daniil Kharms, "Who?" by Alexander Vvedensky (poet) and the collected fairy tales of Gianni Rodari. In 1996, the book "Entertaining Munchausen“ was awarded second place in the All-Russian contest "Book Art” held in Moscow. In 2009, The Surprising Adventures of Baron Munchausen by Rudolf Erich Raspe was again awarded in the "Art of the Book" contest. In 1997, the book "Small But Proud Birdies" was awarded in the same first degree. In 2003, Nikolay Vorontsov was awarded "Man of the book" for "Samson and Roberto" by Ingvar Ambjørnsen published by Azbooka Publishing House. In 2008, he published "Shkotlivaya encyclopaedia" where Vorontsov was credited as a writer. In 2011, his English-Russian Dictionary won "The image of the book" competition.

Vorontsov often uses collages, postmodernism and quotes from books and films in his feature illustrations in an effect to be acknowledged as a co-author of the written work in the tales.

== Bibliography ==
- Rudolf Erich Raspe, Surprising Adventures of Baron Munchausen (1995, second edition 2004, third edition 2009)
- Nikolay Vorontsov, «Small, but Proud Birdies» (1996)
- Sergey Sedov, Faritales about Zmey Gorinych (2000)
- Igor Alimov, Plastilinovaya Zhizn. Artorix. (2003)
- Igor Alimov, Plastilinovaya Zhizn. Clockard. (2003)
- Igor Alimov, Plastilinovaya Zhizn. Sartie. (2003)
- Nikolay Gol', Wolf Ooh. The Case about Aliens. (2005)
- Oleg Grigoriev, Bully poems (2005)
- Ingvar Ambjørnsen, Samson and Roberto. Unexpected Inheritance (2002)
- Ingvar Ambjørnsen, Самсон и Роберто. Cool fellas (2002)
- Ingvar Ambjørnsen, Самсон и Роберто. The secret of pater Pietro (2002)
- Luciano Malmusi, Neandertal Boy and Big Adventure (2005)
- Luciano Malmusi, Neandertal Boy and Kromanyons (2006)
- Luciano Malmusi, Neandertal Boy at school and on the free-time (2006)
- Ian Whybrow, Little Wolf's Book of Badness (2006)
- Ian Whybrow, Little Wolf's Haunted Hall for Small Horrors (2006)
- Ian Whybrow, Little Wolf: Forest Detective (2007)
- Ian Whybrow, Little Wolf, Pack Leader (2007)
- Ian Whybrow, Little Wolf, Terror of the Shivery Sea (2008)
- Funny Cat Encyclopaedia (2008)
- Grigoriy Oster, Naughty Advices (2008)
- Sergey Sedov, «Tales about Kings» (2008)
- English-Russian Picture Dictionary (2009)
- Grigoriy Oster, Fairytale With Details (2009)
- Oleg Grigoriev, Naughty Poems (2009)
- Oleg Grigoriev, Funny Poems (2011)
- Igor Shevchuck, Pedal of Cucumber (2011)
- Grigoriy Oster, Naughty Advices for Businessmen (2008)
- Grigoriy Oster, The Book About Healthy Food for Women (2009)
- Grigoriy Oster, Robinson and 13 greeds (2011)
- Grigoriy Oster, Kids and Those (in 3 parts) (2011–2012)
- Grigoriy Oster «Fairytale» (2011)
- Korney Chukovsky, King Paunchy (2010)
- Andrey Usachev, Thousand and one mice (2012)
- Andrey Usachev, Cat everyday! (2012)
- A-a-a-BC by Nikolay Vorontsov (2013)
- Anton Soya, Starlet. The Little Horse that Sings (2013)
- Nikolay Vorontsov, Diary of Cat Pompon (2014)
- Nikolay Vorontsov, The Book about Tasty and Fast Food by Cat Pompon (2014)
- Nikolay Vorontsov, Cat Pompon and Small But Proud Birdies (2014)
