= Charles Falzon =

Canadian entertainment executive

Charles John Falzon (born August 1957) is a Canadian entertainment executive, educator and university administrator. He is currently Professor of Media Production at Toronto Metropolitan University in Toronto, Ontario, Canada, having served as Dean of The Creative School at the university for ten years. Previously, he had a successful twenty-five year career as an executive producer and distributor in Canada, the UK, and the US. He has produced nearly 2,000 hours of television programming, feature films and documentaries, and has been recognized with several Gemini Awards and an international Emmy Award nomination.

Falzon is credited as a producer on thirty titles, including Thomas and the Magic Railroad (2000), Harry and His Bucket Full of Dinosaurs (2005), Ghost Trackers (2005-2006), Artzooka (2010), Extreme Babysitting (2013-2014), Foreign Affairs (1992) and The Naked Entrepreneur (2016). He has presided over or co-chaired several international entertainment companies.

== Biography ==
Falzon studied television in what was then known as the Radio and Television Arts program at Ryerson Polytechnical Institute (now known as the RTA School of Media). Following graduation, Falzon moved into the marketing department of CBC TV, which was "then a very small division in the corporation, selling about $500,000 a year of CBC programming." Falzon "travelled the world selling CBC programs to other broadcasters," and within five years annual sales topped $5 million.

After leaving the CBC, Falzon founded Producers Group International in 1987 with fellow Ryerson graduate Gary Howsam." PGI and Falzon's "salesmanship" were credited in a 1989 Toronto Star article for helping "many of Canada's film makers, from mega-buck productions at the CBC to small independents" get their "programs screened around the world" -- including a CTV drama series named Mount Royal and a "popular music program from CITY-TV" titled The New Music.

With Falzon at the helm, Catalyst Entertainment produced Foreign Affairs, Canada's "first daily, afternoon soap opera", which was set and shot in Argentina and was created, produced, written and performed "mainly by Canadians." The series was pre-sold to Germany, Spain, Italy, Britain, South America and the United States The commercial success of the show was premised on the idea that "an internationally based soap opera would bypass the usual handicaps of Canadian TV".

In 2000, Falzon teamed Catalyst Entertainment up with Britain's Britt Allcroft to make the first feature film involving Thomas the Tank Engine, titled Thomas and the Magic Railroad. Featuring Alec Baldwin, Peter Fonda and Mara Wilson, the film was animated and produced by Catalyst Entertainment, which at the time also produced Shining Time Station, "the half-hour program that introduced Thomas to U.S. audiences." The film, which cost US$20 million to produce, combined live action and animation. On the success of the Thomas brand, Falzon remarked that "the simplicity and the safeness of Thomas is what makes him so successful," adding that it's "not about being high-tech"; rather, it's "really still about storytelling and characters that [children] can trust and feel good with."

By 2001, Falzon was serving as President of Gullane Entertainment (formerly the Britt Alcroft Company), with operations in London, New York, Los Angeles, Toronto and Tokyo. That year, Falzon announced two significant acquisitions of entertainment properties by Gullane: Fireman Sam , and Guinness World Records for a reported $65 million.

Falzon became co-chairman of CCI Entertainment in 2002, which grew out of the merger in 2002 of Arnie Zipursky's Cambium Entertainment and Catalyst Entertainment, which was led by Falzon. A "Canadian cartoon producer", CCI was "best known for properties like Harry and His Bucket Full of Dinosaurs, Erky Perky, and Shining Time Station."

=== Academic life ===
In 2010, Falzon was appointed an associate professor and assumed the role of chair of the RTA School of Media.

As chair of the RTA School of Media, Falzon was "one of the architects" of a new BA in Sport Media, housed in the old Maple Leaf Gardens, known today as the Mattamy Athletic Centre. Focusing on sports entertainment, business, marketing and media, the program was noted as the first of its kind in Canada.

In 2015, Falzon was appointed Dean of the Faculty of Communication and Design at Ryerson University for a five-year term effective July 1. In the appointment notice, Falzon was credited with renewing the reputation of the RTA School of Media, refreshing the curriculum across its three undergraduate programs, establishing the Transmedia Zone and RTA Productions, launching a collaborative summer program called "RTA in LA", and teaching for more than 20 years.

Falzon holds a master's in theology from the University of Toronto and a master's in spirituality from Regis College. He teaches at the undergraduate and graduate level at Ryerson in the area of media ethics and business.
