= Harry and His Bucket Full of Dinosaurs =

Children's books and animated television series

- Animated adaptation series logo
- Based on: Harry and His Bucket Full of Dinosaurs by Ian Whybrow and Adrian Reynolds
- Developed by: Tony Collingwood
- Directed by: Graham Ralph
- Voices of: Andrew Chalmers; Susan Roman; Ellen-Ray Hennessy; Jamie Watson; Ron Rubin; Andrew Sabiston; Juan Chioran; Stacey DePass; Bryn McAuley; Amanda Soha; Jonathan Wilson
- Music by: Steve D'Angelo; Terry Tompkins
- Countries of origin: Canada; United Kingdom
- Original language: English
- No. of seasons: 2
- No. of episodes: 52 (104 segments)

Production
- Executive producers: Arnie Zipursky; Annette Frymer; Christopher O'Hare; David Snyder; William D. Gross; Injay W. Tai; Charles Falzon (season 2)
- Producers: Kristine Klohk; Helen Cohen; John Cary (season 2)
- Running time: 22 minutes (11 minutes per segment)
- Production companies: Collingwood O'Hare Entertainment Ltd. (Note: As Harry's Dinosaur Limited (season 1) and Harry's Dinosaur 2 Limited (season 2)); Silver Fox Films; Teletoon (season 1); Treehouse TV (season 2); CCI Entertainment (Note: Credited as CCI Releasing for some episodes. Produced as Harry's Bucket Inc. (season 1) and Harry's Bucket Series II Inc. (season 2))

Original release
- Network: Teletoon (Canada, season 1); Treehouse TV (Canada, season 2); Discovery Kids (Latin America); Cartoon Network (United States, season 1); Super RTL (Germany, season 1); Playhouse Disney (United Kingdom); Channel 5 (United Kingdom, season 2)
- Release: 28 March 2005 – 2008

Harry and His Bucket Full of Dinosaurs is a series of children's books written and illustrated by Ian Whybrow and Adrian Reynolds. The series is about a 5-year-old boy named Harry, who has a bucket full of six dinosaurs (seven in the books) named Taury, Trike, Patsy, Pterence, Sid, and Steggy. In the books, the dinosaurs talk to Harry but seem to be toys to the other characters. The other main characters are Mum, Nana, Harry's best friend Charlie, and Harry's sister Sam. A major difference is that the book series includes an Anchisaurus as one of Harry's dinosaurs, while the TV series, for unknown reasons, does not.

It was later adapted into a British-Canadian 104-episode animated television series of the same name, which premiered on Teletoon in Canada on 28 March 2005 and ended in 2008. It is a co-production between CCI Entertainment in Canada and Collingwood O'Hare Entertainment Ltd. in the United Kingdom, presented by CCI Releasing, in association with Discovery Kids Latin America, Teletoon (season 1), Treehouse TV (season 2), Cartoon Network (season 1), Super RTL (season 1), Channel 5 Broadcasting Limited (season 2), and Playhouse Disney UK. In the TV series, Harry plays with the dinosaurs by jumping into the bucket, which transports him to another world, called DinoWorld. Although the dinosaurs are toy-sized in the normal world, within DinoWorld they become dinosaur-sized, while Harry retains his actual size. The TV episodes are available on DVD in two volumes.

In 2011, it was announced that the show would have a series of apps for the iOS and Android platform and will include some interactive elements.

In the US, Cartoon Network aired the series as part of its short-lived Tickle-U block. Reruns of the series later aired on Qubo from 30 June 2012, to 25 December 2020.

== Book list ==
- Harry and the Dinosaurs Go On holiday
- Harry and the Bucket Full of Dinosaurs
- Harry and the Dinosaurs at the Museum
- Harry and the Dinosaurs Make a Splash
- Harry and the Dinosaurs Go Wild
- Harry and the Dinosaurs Say "Raahh"
- Harry and the Robots
- Romp in the Swamp
- Harry and the Dinosaurs Make a Christmas Wish
- Harry and the Dinosaurs Go to School
- Harry and the Dinosaurs Have a Very Busy Day
- Harry and the Dinosaurs Play Hide and Seek
- Harry and the Dinosaurs Tell the Time
- Harry and the Snow King
- Harry and the Dinosaurs and the Bucketful of Stories

A compilation of Harry and His Bucketful of Dinosaurs, Harry and the Dinosaurs say "Raahh", Harry and the Robots, Romp in the Swamp and Harry and the Snow King (Edition in UK with Audio CD read by Andrew Sachs)

== Voice cast ==
=== Original Canadian cast ===
- Andrew Chalmers as Harry
- Jamie Watson as Taury the Tyrannosaurus
- Ron Rubin as Trike the Triceratops
- Andrew Sabiston as Pterence the Pterodactylus
- Stacey DePass as Patsy the Apatosaurus
- Juan Chioran as Sid the Scelidosaurus
- Jonathan Wilson as Steggy the Stegosaurus
- Amanda Soha as Charley/Charlie
- Susan Roman as Harry's Mother
- Bryn McAuley as Sam, Harry's older sister
- Ellen-Ray Hennessy as Nana, Harry's maternal grandmother

=== British cast ===
- Emma Tate as Harry / Harry's Mother / Nana
- Jimmy Hibbert as Taury
- Tom Eastwood as Trike
- Ben Small as Pterence / Sid
- Lynn Cleckner as Patsy / Sam / Charlie
- David Holt as Steggy

== Development ==
The series was initially announced in March 2001, under the book's North American title Sammy and the Dinosaurs, as a co-production with Catalyst Entertainment and Gullane Entertainment, where the latter would have full distribution rights. The show continued production after Catalyst's merger with Cambrium Entertainment into CCI Entertainment, and in 2003, after CCI re-acquired its library and stake from HIT Entertainment (who purchased Gullane back in October 2002), the series then was renamed to its original name and was announced that CCI Entertainment would co-produce the series with Collingwood O'Hare Entertainment. By June 2003, production for the series was announced to start in the Autumn, and that CCI Releasing would hold worldwide distribution rights.

== Broadcast and home media ==
Initial broadcasters for the series were Teletoon (Canada), Playhouse Disney (British Pay TV), Discovery Kids (Latin America), and Super RTL (Germany), all of which co-commissioned the series.

The initial run of broadcasters who acquired the series were France 5 (France), Nickelodeon (Australia Pay TV), YLE (Finland), NRK (Norway), SVT (Sweden), and TV2 (Denmark). This was followed up in May 2005 with Channel 5's Milkshake! block acquiring British free TV rights, and showing it in tandem with Playhouse Disney from October. In November, this was followed up with ABC (Australia Free TV), RaiSat (Italy), Cartoon Network (India), RTP (Portugal), RTÉ (Ireland), RTV (Slovenia), and E-Junior (Middle East) acquiring broadcast rights in the respective regions. On the same day, it was also announced that 2 Entertain had acquired home media rights to the series in the United Kingdom.

== Episodes ==
Episode titles for season one are taken directly from the episodes. Episode titles for season two are taken from the official Harry and His Bucket Full of Dinosaurs website. There are a number of differences between the actual titles and the titles as listed on the website. In all episodes, the first words spoken by the dinosaurs or Harry are the title of the episode.

All episodes were directed by Graham Ralph.

=== Season 1 (2005–06) ===
No.	Title	Written by	Storyboard by
1	"Aaagh!"	Louise Moon	Dimitrije Kostic
Harry has a nightmare in which he is chased by a monster, so he goes to Dino-World in an attempt to hide from it. But because the monster is created by Harry's imagination it materializes in Dino-World and terrorizes Harry and the dinos until Harry imagines the monster as harmless and friendly.
2	"Overdue!"	Patrick Granleese	Rui Albino
Harry is upset to learn that he must return his library book so decides to hide the book in Dino-World, but it comes to life. Although Harry and the dinos try to entertain the book, it is unhappy in Dino-World and tries to escape. Eventually the book persuades Harry to return it to the library where there are lots more books waiting to be read.
3	"But I Like Mud!"	Michael Maurer	Todd Sullivan
Harry is reluctant to have a bath so he goes to Dino-World where he endeavours to become as dirty and stinky as he possibly can. He becomes so repulsively filthy that even the dinosaurs don't want to play with him and he is even crowned King of the Swamp. However, when faced with losing his hair as a result of his uncleanness, Harry decides a bath would actually be quite nice after all.
4	"It's a Kitty!"	Richard Clark	Todd Sullivan
Harry's friend Charley brings her new kitten (Buster) to visit Harry. Buster follows the terrified dinosaurs into Dino-World where there ensues a safari-style mission to catch Buster and bring him safely back home.
5	"Can I Join?"	Karen Moonah	John Lei
Harry is disappointed to find that he is not able to join in with any of the activities his family are taking part in at home, so he decides to go to Dino-World to invent his own clubs, which only himself and the dinosaurs can join - e.g. bungee jumping, messy cooking...
6	"What Mess?"	Cathy Moss	Troy Sullivan
When Harry is told to tidy his room, he simply transfers all the mess into Dino-world, where he is told there is a 'no tidying up rule'. This results in chaos in Dino-World and Pterence ends up getting lost in all the junk, prompting Harry to tidy Dino-World - and his bedroom.
7	"Uh-Oh!"	Victor Nicolle	Dimitrije Kostic
Harry accidentally smashes his mom's favourite china teacup. Harry, Charley, and the Dinos are unable to fix it themselves so they take it to Dino-World to try to repair it. Unable to do so, Harry is forced to admit to his mom that he has broken it. As a thoughtful gesture, Harry replaces the cup with a homemade cup.
8	"Nobody's Listening to Me!"	Bruce Robb	Todd Sullivan
Harry needs help making up a story to go with his new drawing but gets the impression that everybody at home is ignoring him so he heads into Dino-World in a bad mood. The Dinos follow him, now committed to helping him, but they all lose their voices whilst arguing over what the story should be about. There follows a struggled attempt to get their voices back, which inadvertently provides the story that Harry was looking for all along.
9	"I Wish!"	Dennise Fordham	Dermot Walshe
When Harry is disappointed that none of his wishes come true in the normal world, the dinosaurs take him to visit the wishing well in Dino-World where wishes are readily granted. The story ends with Harry wishing he hadn't wished for anything in the first place.
10	"Yo Ho Ho!"	Louise Moon	Todd Sullivan
Harry, Charley, and the dinosaurs are playing at being pirates. Harry is the captain of the pirate ship but becomes so unbearably bossy that the dinos decide to strike and partake in a mutiny - banishing Harry to a desert island alone. Upon reflection, Harry realises how badly he has behaved, and after apologising, he promises never to be bossy again.
11	"Harry, Ace Reporter!"	Tony Collingwood	Rui Albino
Harry decides to imitate his Mom by becoming a newspaper reporter for the day. Harry can find nothing news-worthy at home so goes to Dino-World to report on the world's first ever dinosaur race.
12	"What's for Breakfast?"	Karen Moonah	Troy Sullivan
When Harry is disappointed that he can't have what he wants for breakfast he goes to Dino-world where he has created a diner and appointed himself as head chef. Harry starts to feel the pressure of running a diner when the dinosaurs start complaining about the quality of the food. In an attempt to please everybody, Harry bakes a special dino-cake, but this turns out to be very unpopular. The episode ends with Harry returning home for some of Nana's cooking which he thoroughly enjoys.
13	"I Wish It Would Stop Raining!"	Bruce Robb	Dimitrije Kostic
Harry fails to see any benefit in rain when a visit to the beach is rained off. He decides to go to Dino World where it is extremely sunny and hot, and more importantly, he can wear his new sunglasses. However, the discovery of a beached dolphin and subsequent rescue operation soon makes Harry realise just how important rain is.
14	"Goal!"	Patrick Granleese	Todd Sullivan
Harry and Charley have their football confiscated because they are unable to play football together without arguing. They go to Dino-World to find a replacement football and have another match. Charley is not very good at football so Harry becomes vociferously frustrated with her and then sulks off on his own. While Harry is alone reflecting on his behaviour, the dinos help Charley to improve her football skills. He ends up apologising for being so mean to Charley and the story ends with the pair reconciled and enjoying a friendly game of football in Harry's garden.
15	"Achoo"	Richard Clark	Jeff Bittle
Harry has a cold but gets bored of staying in bed so decides to go and play in Dino world where he manages to make all of the other dinosaurs sick, except Steggy who gets paranoid that he will also get sick. Patsy and Harry set up a hospital to take care of the sick dinos, but when Patsy also falls ill and Taury's cure recipe fails, Harry takes all the dinos back to his room for some of Mom's chicken soup.
16	"Super Harry!"	Mark Holloway	Todd Sullivan
At home, Harry is pretending to be a superhero, but his efforts to help his family only cause more problems, so he goes to Dino-World where he can be a real superhero thanks to the super-hero qualities displayed by each of his dinosaurs. When he finds his Mom's missing car keys Harry becomes a true superhero in her eyes.
17	"Today's the Day!"	Lawrence S. Mirkin	Rui Albino
Harry is finding it difficult to learn to play the violin and is fearful about performing in his school concert so he goes to Dino-World to practice. As he is playing, musical notes come to life around him. When Harry finds he is making many mistakes he decides to quit, at which point the musical notes run away to the jumpin' joint on Piano Hill. Harry and the dinos follow the notes and learn that making music, even when making mistakes, is great fun.
18	"You're Too Little!"	Alexandra Zarowny	Dermot Walshe
When Harry discovers that he is too small to pick apples he goes to the Dino-World Mooseum to find some growth enhancing milk from a mechanical cow. To Harry's surprise and concern the milk first makes him far too big then far too small. With the help of an ant army, Harry and the dinos manage to find the cow again and return Harry to his normal size.
19	"Can You Hear a Drip?"	Alan Gilbey	Troy Sullivan
When Sam uses Harry's bucket to collect drips from a leak in the house Harry rushes to Dino-World to save the dinos from drowning. Dino World has flooded and is inhabited by Harry's bathtub toys which lead him to discover that the source of the leak is the running bath faucet. Harry rushes home to stop the leak.
20	"Who Says My Dinosaurs Aren't Cool?"	Michael Maurer	Dimitrije Kostic
At his school's 'Show and Tell', Harry's dinosaurs are branded as old-fashioned in comparison to one of the other kid's hi-tech Dino-Robot. Harry decides to build a Raging-Rex robot, but upon completion the creature quickly becomes out of control. Harry and the dinos rush to rescue Dino-World. Harry is so impressed by the dinos' bravery and the power attributed to them by his imagination that he proudly informs his peers at the next 'Show and Tell' just how amazing his dinos really are.
21	"I Can't Find My Favorite Sock!"	Bruce Robb	Dimitrije Kostic
Harry can't find one of his red cowboy socks - the ones with a white fringe. Unable to find it at home, he goes to Dino-World in an attempt to track it down. Upon arrival, Harry and the dinos find that Dino World is overrun by a herd of lost socks, amongst which is the one he's looking for. Now all he needs to do is coax it back to reality.
22	"I Promise!"	Dennise Fordham	Jeff Bittle
When Charley lends Harry her Sergeant Shout toy for the weekend, Harry promises not to let it leave in his bedroom. But because the bucket is also in Harry's bedroom, he thinks it would technically be OK for him to take Sergeant Shout into Dino World. Sgt. Shout loves dino world and through intense boot camp style training, he tries to teach Harry and the dinos how to be soldiers. Harry finds that promises can be hard to keep when Sgt. Shout is reluctant to return to the real world.
23	"Abracadabra!"	Richard Clark	Dermot Walshe
Harry receives a box of magic tricks for Christmas but is unable to create any magic. Disgruntled, he visits Dino-World where to his delight he comes across a book of magic tricks who tries to teach him how to do tricks properly. When all of the tricks go ridiculously wrong the owner of the book - a rabbit named Mr. Wiggle-Noso teaches Harry that to believe in and create magic he must first believe in himself.
24	"I Am Not Going"	Victor Nicolle	Christopher Richard
Harry is scared of going to the dentist, but when Trike complains that his horn is sore Harry insists that Trike goes to the Horntist in Dino World. Harry is allowed to be the Horntist's Assistant for the visit and quickly becomes fascinated by the world of dinodentistry. Upon returning home Harry can't wait for the dinos to accompany him to see his dentist.
25	"Me First"	Karen Moonah	Troy Sullivan
Whilst playing in the yard with Charley, Harry insists on being first on the swing, and then manages to destroy her sandcastle by being boisterous in the sandbox. Charley goes home annoyed, so Nana gives Harry a book on King Arthur and his Knights so that he can learn about good manners. But after reading the book, Harry is more interested in knightly activities like jousting and battling with dragons, than chivalry and kindness, so he goes to Dino World to play at being a knight. When Harry is imprisoned by a selfish dragon, he learns that good manners are very important.
26	"Oops!"	Sheila Dinsmore	Jeff Bittle
Harry is playing his favourite computer game when he accidentally loses Mom's latest report for her newspaper. With the help of a computer mouse in Dino-World he embarks on a journey to the computers recycle bin in an attempt to retrieve it before it is lost forever.
27	"Who to Choose?"	Patrick Granleese	Shane Doyle
Charley is having a sleepover and has invited Harry, however, Charley's Mom says he is only allowed to bring one of the dinos with him. Harry finds is very difficult to choose so as a final solution, Harry invites Charley to a sleepover at his house instead.
28	"Origami!"	Karen Moonah	Dimitrije Kostic
Harry goes to Dino-World to learn how to make origami animals. In Dino-World he meets Tatsu the dragon who accidentally burns all of his origami creations every time he breathes. Harry makes a giant origami fan from some blueprint designs created by Tatsu, the fan blows out Tatsu's fire thus enabling him to continue making origami animals.
29	"I Win!"	Richard Clark	Ed Lee
Harry is frustrated at losing games to Sam, Mom, and Nana, so he visits Dino-World where he makes up many games and wins every time. To find out who is the ultimate winner, the dinos invent a new complicated game, but after the game has taken them on a fun journey all over Dino-World they realise that winning isn't important as long as they are having fun.
30	"I Want to Do Them All!"	Dennise Fordham	Christopher Richard
Harry wants to do many things at once so instead of choosing one activity he goes to Dino-World to replicate himself so that he can do them all. The play-doh clones of himself that Harry creates aren't much fun for the dinos to play with. The story ends with Harry learning the value of pacing himself and taking part in one activity at a time.
31	"I Keep Going Over the Edges!"	Bruce Robb	Charles E. Bastien
Harry has difficulty colouring in - he keeps going over the edges. Frustrated, he goes to Dino-World where he can make as much mess as he wants as there are no edges and no rules. Whilst there, Harry meets a sad zebra who lives in a part of Dino-World that is black and white. Harry and the dinos colour in this bleak part of dino-world by painting all the flowers, traffic lights, trees etc. In doing so, Harry discovers that he does have the ability to stay within the edges but that sometimes it is fun to make a mess too.
32	"Cookies!"	Alexandra Zarowny	Raymond Jafelice
When Harry thinks his delicious cookie has been stolen he goes to Dino-World where he plays at being a detective searching for the thief. After much searching, and a court trial, Harry realises that, much to his embarrassment, he had actually eaten the cookie himself.
33	"Can I Keep It?"	Sheila Dinsmore	Dimitrije Kostic
When Harry finds a nest with an egg in it he wants to keep it, but Nana explains that it wouldn't be fair. In Dino-World Harry finds, and takes care of, an egg far larger than the egg at home. Eventually, a baby chick is born and thinks that Sid is its mother, now Sid and the chick are inseparable, but they all learn that caring for a baby is hard work. So Harry and the dinos endeavour to reunite the chick with its real mother, and are relieved to watch them fly south together.
34	"I Don't Want to Go to Bed"	Michael Maurer	Julian Harris
Harry wants to stay up all night so he goes to Dino-World where he can play for as long as he wants. But Harry and the Dinos discover that their energy has a limit when they all become thoroughly exhausted from trying to avoid Harry's angry alarm clock, which has chased them around Dino-World all night.
35	"Look What I Found!"	Karen Moonah	Blair Kitchen
Harry finds a skipping rope outside his house and decides that 'Finders should be Keepers', so he goes to Dino World to play with it. Whilst there, Sid loses his glasses, and finds that they have been claimed by a troll who also believes in the 'Finders Keepers' rule. Harry and the dinos have trouble getting the glasses back, and learn that it is not fair to keep things that belong to someone else.
36	"I Still Can't Hear You"	Patrick Granleese	Jeff Bittle
Harry is nervous about giving a speech about dinosaurs to his classmates, so he goes to Dino-World to practice, in the hope of gaining confidence. Whilst there, he finds that the annual dinosaur convention is taking place, and Steggy, who is suffering from severe stage fright, is expected to deliver the key-note speech. Steggy and Harry help each other overcome their fears and both deliver triumphant speeches.
37	"To Outer Space!"	Sheila Dinsmore	Ed Lee
Harry takes his blue and red robots into Dino World so that he can continue the battle they were having at home, but without Nana's scorn. When he arrives he finds a spaceship waiting for him which takes him to meet two rangers who are trying to build a space station, but their creation is hindered by their constant quarrelling. By trying to reconcile the rangers, Harry learns that it is far better to be friendly and work as a team than to argue and fight.
38	"Hail the Queen!"	Victor Nicolle	Todd Sullivan
After watching a movie about the life of a Cleopatra, the gang go to Dino World to make Patsy Queen. The other dinos grow a little restless, and want to play a game that is a little more interesting and includes treating everyone as equals. Patsy then decides to have a chariot race, and learns that playing with the other dinos is much more fun than being waited on hand and foot.
39	"Steggy's Not Here!"	Karen Moonah	Dimitrije Kostic
Harry returns from a day out at an amusement park called Magic Land, and finds out that Steggy disappeared. After searching the house, everyone wonder where else they could look for Steggy. After much searching, Harry remembers that they had been playing hide and seek before visiting the theme park - it turns out that Steggy was at home looking for them all along.
40	"Get Growing!"	Ian Whybrow	Christopher Richard
Harry wants to grow some roses for Mother's day but he needs them to grow in just one day so he goes to Dino-World where flowers grow quickly. When Harry covers his seeds in too much dino-fertilizer, they take over the garden, he then has to shrink the plants back to normal size in order to get out of the garden and go home. Harry learns that growing flowers takes time so he thoughtfully gives his Mom a flowerpot containing rose seeds so that she will have roses on every Mother's day.
41	"Let's Rock!"	Sheila Dinsmore	Jeff Bittle
Harry isn't allowed to join Sam's band because he's not very good at playing the drums. He goes to Dino-World where he and the dinos gather together to play various percussion instruments. Pterence leaves the group because he can't keep time so he goes off to a cave by himself. He learns to play some great rhythms based on the sounds of nature around him. Harry and the dinos miss Pterence and go to find him, they are very impressed by what he has learned.
42	"I Wish I Was a Builder!"	Richard Clark	Troy Sullivan
Harry wants to build a dream house and realises he must go to Dino-World in order to find the space and materials to build. Once there, the dinos each offer Harry different ideas and advice on how and what to build, so Harry decides that everyone should build their own individual dream homes. Although Steggy finds it difficult to build, he turns out to be great at demolition and when Dino world becomes too crowded, he helps the dinos turn Rocklake Valley back to its original state by knocking down all the buildings.
43	"What Happens Next?"	Karen Moonah	Charles E. Bastien
Nana is reading Harry a bedtime fairy story, but decides it is time for Harry to go to sleep before the story is finished. Although Nana promises to finish the story by tomorrow, Harry and the Dinos go to Dino World to invent the ending themselves.
44	"Circus!"	Patrick Granleese	Julian Harris
Charley wants to go to the circus but her Mom is unable to take her. As a solution, Harry and the dinos create a make-believe circus in Harry's garden for Charley. Trouble is, next-door's cat isn't a very realistic lion, so the gang head to Dino World to join a real circus.
45	"When I Grow Up!"	Dennise Fordham	Dimitrije Kostic
Harry decides he wants to be a zookeeper when he grows up, but he can't wait until then so he opens his very own zoo in Dino-World. Harry befriends a young elephant, and with the help of his friends, endeavours to teach it how to trumpet.
46	"The Postman's Here!"	Nicole Demerse	Todd Sullivan
When a letter addressed to a 'Mr. Snow' is delivered to Harry's house, Harry concludes that Mr. Snow must live in Dino-World so he sets off with the dinos to hand-deliver the letter to him. After a series of adventures, Harry finds Mr. Snow but learns that the letter is not for him, it is for Mr. Snow's twin who lives on Harry's street.
47	"I Can Play Music!"	Alexandra Zarowny	Blair Kitchen
Harry wants to surprise Mom when she returns home from shopping - so he decides he will play her some music. However, he doesn't want to play his violin so he goes to Dino World in search of a new instrument to play.
48	"Help!"	Patrick Granleese	Shane Doyle
Harry is impressed when he learns that firemen don't just put out fires, they also rescue people. In fact, he's so impressed that he decides to become a fireman himself - in Dino World. Whilst in training, Harry and the dinos learn all about the importance of good communication and teamwork.
49	"It's In Nana's Room"	Sheila Dinsmore	Ed Lee
Harry and the dinos discover that there's a new dinosaur in the house, and it belongs to Nana. Aptly named the 'Nanosaurus', it turns out that this little dinosaur is renowned for its clumsiness. When Harry and the dinos chase the Nanosaurus into Dino World, they only have to follow the trail of wreckage left in its wake in order to find it.
50	"Can I Sleep In My Tent?"	Richard Clark; Based on a story by Dennise Fordham	Raymond Jafelice
Harry wants to sleep out in his new tent in the garden so that he can practice his scout skills. He looks out of the window and it is pouring with rain, but there's no room to put up his tent in his bedroom. If Harry can't camp in the garden for real, there's only one other place he can practice his scout skills.
51	"I Spy!"	Alexandra Zarowny	Charles E. Bastien
Harry and the dinos are playing a game of "I Spy", Harry decides to 'spy' his dinos, but he can't remember their proper dinosaur names. Nana once invented a song to help her remember the names when she was Harry's age, but she's forgotten the words. Surely the words will be found in Dino-World, especially with the help of Harry's friend Old Saxon the saxophone.
52	"It's Made of Cheese!"	Nicole Demerse	Dimitrije Kostic
Harry and Charley are arguing over what the moon is made of. In order to settle their dispute, they take a rocket journey to the moon via Dino World. Once they arrive, they discover that the moon is in fact made of chocolate chip cookies, they also discover why it is covered in huge craters - the moon is inhabited by a hungry monster.

=== Season 2 (2007–08) ===
No.	Title	Written by	Storyboard by
53	"What's Thunder?"	Patrick Granleese	Ray Jafelice
Stuck indoors watching a lightning storm from his bedroom window, Harry wonders what exactly causes thunder and lightning to happen, and decides to visit Dino World to find out. Harry and the dinos encounter some mischievous characters, Mr Thunder and Mrs Lightning, who despite Harry's desperate attempts to calm them down, just seem to enjoy making noise too much. The gang decide that since they can't beat them, then they may as well join them. Harry and the dinos win the battle of the noise and return triumphantly home to eat Nana's cookies.
54	"Once Upon a Time"	Nicole Demerse	Jeff Bittle
Harry needs a green crayon to illustrate his story about a naughty troll, but he finds Sam unwilling to share her art supplies with him. He goes to Dino World to see if he can track down the materials there, but instead stumbles across the same naughty Troll from his story. The Troll will not let him cross the stream without a magic password, just like in his project. After many unsuccessful guesses Harry realises that a simple "please" goes a long way.
55	"Superheroes Don't Dance!"	Sheila Dinsmore	Rick Morrison
Harry and his friend Charley play a game of superheroes together. Afterwards when Charley invites Harry to a dance party, he declines, saying, "Superheroes are way too busy fighting crime, and saving the planet to dance". The dinos lead Harry on an adventure in Dino World that will prove to him that superheroes and dancing can be great fun.
56	"I Love Strawberries!"	Cathy Moss	Daniel Payette
Harry really wants to eat the strawberries growing in the garden but Mom warns him that they will not be ripe for another week. Imagining that someone may beat him to eating them, Harry dreams up a character called the 'Great Strawberry Nibbler'. When Harry and his dino gang go to taste the strawberries in Dino World, they find that a greedy creature has been eating all the strawberries. It is the work of the 'Great Strawberry Nibbler'. After many failed efforts, they finally manage to trap the culprit and banish him from Dino World. Harry then has a change of heart, and decides to bring back the Nibbler to share the last strawberry with him, realizing that sharing is much more fun than greed.
57	"I Wish I Could Fly!"	Cathy Moss	Daniel Payette
When Harry loses his helium balloon he wishes that he had the ability to fly. Curious that this may actually be a possibility in Dino World, Harry and dinos go off to find out. However, flying doesn't turn out to be so simple in Dino World as everyone learns the hard way. Mad cap balloon adventures get a little tricky, as poor Steggy nearly disappears off into the sky. Harry and Pterence heroically rescue their unfortunate friend, and Harry gets to experience what it is like to fly in the process.
58	"What a Cold Nose!"	Patrick Granleese	Todd Sullivan
Whilst Nana and Harry are dog sitting for an afternoon, Harry decides to take the puppy for a walk in Dino World. However, in Dino World the puppy is dino sized and Harry and the gang have a challenge trying to discipline and train their fury friend in some tug of war styled capers. They attempt to teach the puppy tricks, and even give him a bath. They all have fun, but realise what a responsibility a puppy can be.
59	"I Want to Help"	Richard Clark	Troy Sullivan
Harry wishes he could help out more with the decorating and so goes to Dino World to see if he can practice his skills there. Whilst in Dino World the gang bump into their dino friend, Nancy the Nanosaurus whom somehow seems to attract more than her fair share of calamity. However, as they all work together as a team, with a little trial and error and a flood of soda, Harry and his friends manage to successfully transform Dino World.
60	"Harry, Bug Hunter!"	Alexandra Zarowny	Kevin Currie
Harry sets out amongst the vegetable garden in search of bugs, as if he were exploring the jungle. Nana warns him to keep and eye out for caterpillars that may be "crunching her cabbages". When a caterpillar accidentally falls into Harry's magical bucket, Harry wastes no time in getting to Dino World to catch up with her. At their arrival they realise that something huge has been devouring Dino World. When they find that the caterpillar is the culprit, they decide to take action, and find other food for her to graze on. Afterwards they make a cosy bed for their new friend. When they wake, they are amazed to see she has morphed into a glorious techni-coloured butterfly.
61	"Zoom!"	Bernice Vanderlaan	Rick Morrison
Planning the best vacation ever is a little tricky when there are so many tastes to please, so Harry goes to Dino World to see if he can find inspiration there. With Nancy as their tour guide, Harry and his Dinosaurs manage to bathe on the beach, climb mountains and walk in the woods. The best time of all however, is had when the gang stumble across a Happy House of fun. Realising that seeing everyone happy makes for the perfect vacation Harry rushes home to Tell Mom, Nana and Sam.
62	"I'm King Harry!"	Sheila Dinsmore	Rick Morrison
Harry jumps in his bucket to Dino World to embark on a noble quest to find Nana's missing glasses. When Harry's heroic intentions are challenged by the cunning Scorch, Harry proves to be the most true and noble knight of all.
63	"Mirror Mirror!"	Patrick Granleese	Jeff Bittle
While looking in the mirror one day, Harry and his dino friends try to imagine what it would be like to step through it. They go to Dino World to see if they can settle their curiosity and get to explore the mysterious place on the other side of the looking glass. At first glance they are surprised that everything looks the same, when it suddenly dawns on them that everything is in the wrong place. Dino-mirror world is a back to front world. Harry and the dinosaurs have fun speaking backwards and meeting many amusingly odd characters along their back to front travels.
64	"Splish Splash!"	Bridget Newson	Ray Jafelice
When Harry's bath toy Ducky falls into his magical bucket, Harry and his dino friends waste no time before, jumping in to find her. Spying Ducky floating in the distant horizon, they immediately board the Dino-mobile which magically transforms into a Super Dino Rescue Boat. They speed off on an action packed sea bound adventure to rescue there drifting friend.
65	"I Want to Go Faster!"	Bruce Robb	Todd Sullivan
Driving along in the car with his family. Harry wishes they could go faster. Mom explains that their car is for getting places safely rather than racing. So Harry decides to go off into Dino World to see if his racing dreams can be realised there. They each have great fun building their own hotrod race cars, and then put them to the test. Even though Dino World is a world of possibility they learn that not every-where is ideal for driving really fast, but before the race is out they come across some excellent, high speed racing ground. The heat is really on as Steggy suddenly gains some extra power and comes up from the back to steal the victory.
66	"Two Plus Two!"	Bernice Vanderlaan	Jeff Bittle
Harry sets off to Dino world in search of the right answer to a tricky math question. Whilst on his quest, Harry runs into some mathematical friends whom all seem to have their own puzzles to solve. Harry helps his new friends through numerous puzzles and finds that his logic for math isn't as absent as he'd first thought. Harry figures out the answer to Nana's sum and proudly dashes home to let her know.
67	"My Tooth Came Out!"	Nancy Trites Botkin	Shane Doyle
When Harry's first tooth comes out, Harry places it under his pillow and waits for a visit from the legendary Tooth Fairy. But Harry is so eager to meet her that he finds it hard to fall asleep, and so decides to go to Dino World to see if he can save her the trip. Instead of the regular Tooth Fairy the gang manage to discover a Dinotoothfairysaurus, a tooth fairy especially for dinosaurs.
68	"Costume Party!"	Patrick Granleese	Daniel Payette
Harry and his friend Charley are invited to a costume party, and there's a prize for the best costume. Harry and team decide that "there's only one place to go to find a really great dress up costume – Dino World!" In Dino World, they all quickly realize that there is something quite special about these particular garments. As when they put them on they become magically transported into another reality. After a space ride, an armor clad adventure with a fire breathing dragon, and a rock concert, they all agree on a truly prize winning costume and go back home to make it for themselves.
69	"Harry the Explorer!"	Bruce Robb	Troy Sullivan
Keen to discover the undiscovered, 'Harry The Explorer' and his dinosaurs go to Dino World to see what new territory they can conquer. Their adventure begins to challenge their creativity as they arrive at the edge of Dino World and discover a completely white space where they can create a new world.
70	"I Wish It Were Yesterday!"	Cathy Moss	Jeff Bittle
Harry really enjoyed yesterday's fun-packed day out and wishes it were yesterday again. When Sid suggests that time travel can be possible in Dino World, the gang waste no time before jumping into the bucket to find out. When they try to turn the clock back to enjoy yesterday again, they soon discover they are getting younger and younger. Can they ever return to Harry's bedroom?
71	"I See a Seashell!"	Richard Clark	Ray Jafelice
While Harry plays on the beach, making sandcastles with his new bucket, he comes across a shell that would make the perfect castle decoration. Harry and the dinosaurs are startled when the shell scuttles off towards a tide pool. As the gang investigate the tide pool, Harry decides that he would love to explore this magnificent world some more, and so he goes into his regular bucket to Dino World to do just that. A fun adventure is had by all and they even come across a familiar creature, in need of a new home, before returning to Nana to explain why the new bucket is missing.
72	"Jump!"	Shawn Kalb	Kevin Currie
Shooting hoops in his driveway with pal Charley, Harry gets a taste of the high life and when the rain puts a stop to his game, he hops into the bucket to Dino World to seek a place where he can jump around all day long. Although when he arrives in Dino World he decides that he would like to be able to jump higher, so Harry and the dinosaurs board the rocket ship to jet them to the planet Boing. On their visit, the gang enjoy some high times indeed, as they become friends with a native Boingian and learn that bouncing is pretty much the local pastime.
73	"Yeehaw!"	Sheila Dinsmore	Shane Doyle
Harry and the Dinos are playing cowboys in the sandbox when Nana calls Harry in for his bath. When Harry discovers that his rubber ducky is missing, there's nothing for it but to go to Dino World and see if he can find it there. In true Western style, Sheriff Harry and his Deputy Dinos are on a mission to rescue his toy and all other missing duckies from the clutches of the elusive Ducky Rustler – AKA 'The Tickler Kid'. After Harry and the Dinos finally locate and set their kidnapped friends free, all they need to do is confront The Tickler Kid and reveal his true identity before it is time to head home for that bath.
74	"Somebody's Moving"	Cathy Moss	Ray Jafelice
It is snowing and some of Harry's neighbours are moving house. Harry and Charley love the idea of being removals' men and, along with the Dinos, decide to go to Dino World to see if anyone needs the assistance of Harry's Moving Crew. They arrive just in time to help Mr Snow who is moving down the hill to a brand new igloo. Mr Snow's mischievous penguin friends also lend a hand to ensure the move goes as smoothly as possible...
75	"Is That Really a Lamp?"	Bernice Vanderlaan	Troy Sullivan
Harry and the Dinos venture into Dino World in search of a Magic Lamp, hoping they'll find a genie who can make their wishes come true. Luckily, Taury stumbles over a lamp as soon as they arrive, but it seems that the genie inside has no intention of granting any wishes because he's going on holiday. Bob the genie announces that Harry will be his replacement while he's away and fun and frolics ensue as Harry gets to grips with his new genie powers.
76	"Aaargh Treasure!"	Richard Clark	Ray Jafelice
Captain Harry and his Dino pirate crew set sail for Treasure Island in search of buried treasure. There are swashbuckling adventures a-plenty aboard their pirate galleon as they navigate their way through the high seas. When the 'Yo Ho Ho!' finally reaches its destination, Harry and the Dinos face a race against time to find the treasure before the mysterious Purple Pirate gets to it first...
77	"Hurray for Pizza!"	Bridget Newson	Daniel Payette
Why don't they make peanut butter and banana pizzas? It is a question Harry has been pondering and the Dinos think they know somewhere you can have any pizza topping you like – Dino World. They arrive at Harry's Pizza Parlour and start making tailor-made pizzas for the inhabitants of Dino World topped with everything from pink icing and cherries, to swamp mud and flies. With Harry at the helm, Trike taking orders and all the Dinos helping to make perfect pizzas, things start going wrong.
78	"Harry the Inventor"	Bruce Robb	Rick Morrison
Harry decides he wants to be an inventor and takes a trip to Dinoworld in search of inspiration. Making sure they're kitted out with lab coats and have all the tools of the trade, Harry and the Dinos set about working on their new inventions. The inventors toil away on their projects, but their inventions don't always turn out as they planned... Remembering Mom's advice that the best inventions always help in some way, Harry learns that sometimes less is more.
79	"Join the Parade"	Bridget Newson	Jeff Bittle
Harry and the Dinos form a marching band and take a trip to Dino World to perform in the National Dino Day parade. Outfitted with musical instruments and uniforms, they set about getting ready for the parade. The only problem is that they seem to be having some trouble playing their instruments. And marching in time. And their music is a little, well, loud. Just as Harry and the Dinos are wondering how you have a parade without making any noise, a big dino-shaped balloon comes to their rescue...
80	"Choo Choo!"	Sheila Dinsmore	Shane Doyle
Harry and the Dinos have an adventure on the Dino World Express – the finest locomotive in all of Dino World. Harry takes the driver's seat and they set off for the trip of a lifetime. At Pepper Rock Station, they encounter a lone sheep and promise to return her to her flock. But with Pillow Mountain to cross, snails on the line and a shortage of track, will they be able to fulfil their promise?
81	"Cool Shadow!"	Patrick Granleese	Ray Jafelice
Harry and the Dinos are having a great time making shadow puppets in Harry's bedroom – until their shadows disappear into Dino World... Fortunately, shadows love to play hide and seek almost as much as dinosaurs, and so follows the greatest game of hide and seek that Dino World has ever seen! But with their ability to hide almost anywhere, the shadows aren't going to make it easy for their more solid counterparts to find them.
82	"Do You Like My Tent?"	Sheila Dinsmore	Jeff Bittle
Harry and the Dinos have set up camp in the living room and it reminds Mom of the time when she went camping with the Nature Guides. She shows them her collection of Guide badges and it inspires Harry and the Dinos to go on a real camping trip and earn their own badges. The intrepid explorers head to Dino World where they embark on an adventure to find The Lost Falls and get some badges along the way. But with pesky bugs and scary monsters to contend with, Harry and the Dinos learn that it is not always as easy as it might seem to earn a badge.
83	"Home"	Patrick Granleese	Troy Sullivan
Harry and the Dinos are having a whale of a time on the Dino World roller coaster – but it is time to go home. Just time for one last ride...The only problem is that Patsy gets the hiccups resulting in a slight 'hiccup' as she travels through the bucket and she arrives back in Harry's bedroom full size. Harry and the other Dinos struggle to hide Patsy from Sam while they try to figure out how to return her to her usual size. Luckily, with a little help from the garden shed and some words of wisdom from Nana, Patsy makes it back to Dino World unscathed.
84	"It's an Alien!"	Bernice Vanderlaan	Rick Morrison
When Harry and the Dinos go to Dino World in search of extraterrestrial life, they're excited (if a little scared) when a bonafide alien arrives in a huge flying saucer. Zazzabop has flown in from outer space in the hope of conquering a new planet and he sets about trying to lay claim to all the major landmarks in Dino World. But as the Dinos point out, they were there first and have already discovered everything and given it a name. Fortunately, Zazzabop finally manages to find something new that he can call his own and he even has time to give Harry a quick ride in his spaceship before heading home.
85	"I Want to Make a Movie"	Bruce Robb	Kevin Currie
Harry wants to make a movie like you see in theatres – a movie with a great story. But Sam needs the video camera for a school project, so Harry will have to wait... Luckily, Nana comes up with a solution as she knows somewhere full of stories that is just the place for making movies, namely Dino World. Harry and the Dinos embark on an adventure to invent the perfect story for their movie and the resulting tale involves pirates, cowboys and even a wacky gorilla. There are a few hiccups along the way, but with Sid as director extraordinaire, Steggy on makeup and Superdino Pterence to the rescue, a masterpiece is created.
86	"Jungle Harry"	Alexandra Zarowny	Ray Jafelice
Harry is 'Jungle Harry', King of the Jungle and friend to all the jungle animals (otherwise known as the Dinos). The only problem is that they're not really in the jungle – they're in the hallway and disturbing Sam, who is trying to finish her homework. So they head to Dino World where they meet some real jungle animals who invite them to their Great Big Jungle Bash. The party preparations are going well until Leslie the LOUD lion arrives and scares away all the other animals. Luckily for Leslie, Harry and the Dinos stick around and try to find a way for all the animals to enjoy the Jungle Bash together.
87	"Emergency"	Bob Ardiel	Rick Morrison
Trike has a bad case of tinselitis after using glitter paint to decorate Harry's toy castle and needs to have a check-up with Dino Doctor Harry in Dino World. By the time they get to the doctor's office, Trike has miraculously recovered and Dr Harry's services appear a little redundant as all the other dinos have a full bill of health too. But a doctor's office is never quiet for long, and sure enough Dr Harry is soon called to treat an emergency case. Scorch, the fire-breathing dragon has lost the ability to breathe fire, so it is Dr Harry to the rescue as he creates an ultra-spicy concoction that will give Scorch his inner fire back.
88	"Dino Snap"	Shawn Kalb	Jeff Bittle
Harry is playing Dino Snap with Nana and realises that one of the Megalosaurus cards has gone missing. He thinks that he probably lost it in his bucket and so Harry and the dinos into Dino World in pursuit of the missing Megaloaurus. What awaits them is a spectacular board-game adventure with giant, dino-sized games to play. All they've got to do is catch the Megalosaurus and reunite him with his matching card before he gets to the top of the lizards and ladders board and it is too late.
89	"I've Got Giggles"	Bernice Vanderlaan	Ray Jafelice
Harry's got the giggles and they're contagious. Before long, all the Dinos are in stitches too and are surprised when they hear a voice telling them to stop laughing. They soon discover that the voice belongs to the Fairy Princess in Dino World and they jump into the bucket to investigate further. When they arrive, a court jester informs them that the Princess has lost her smile and so has banned all things funny. As a result, Harry and the Dinos launch a campaign where they try every funny trick in the book to try to make the Princess laugh again. Alas, it is all to no avail as the Princess remains stony-faced and convinced that the Royal Smile is never to return...Will they ever manage to find her smile again?
90	"I'm Really Hot"	Cathy Moss	Ray Jafelice
It is a sweltering day and Harry and the Dinos are suffering in the heat. A trip to Dino World is called for – a place where you can choose the weather. When they arrive, everything is refreshingly cold and they all marvel at the lovely winter weather. Before long, they meet the mischievous Jack Frostasaurus who is only too happy to sprinkle a little extra frost or create a snowstorm for Harry and the gang. However, things start to go awry when Jack gets a bit carried away and plucks the sun from the sky in an attempt to make things even colder... By the time Harry gets home, he has decided that being too hot is not so bad after all.
91	"The Silly Pencil"	Alexandra Zarowny	Troy Sullivan
Harry is trying to draw a castle, but is having trouble getting his pencil to draw a straight line. In the hope that Dino World may be able to offer a solution, Harry and the Dinos disappear through the bucket and discover a set of ready-drawn straight lines and the perfect blank space to draw a castle. They all work together to build a spectacular castle, but when they step inside, they discover somebody else has already done the decorating. They soon realise that the mysterious interior designer is called Silly Pencil and he can draw anything in a flash, granting wishes and wreaking havoc at the same time.
92	"Now You See Me..."	Patrick Granleese	Kevin Currie
Harry isn't having much luck trying to hide from the Dinos when they play hide and seek, as they always manage to find him. When Taury inadvertently suggests that becoming invisible would be a good way to hide, Harry decides that Dino World could be a good place to try to disappear. With the help of Albert (Steggy's invisible dinosaur friend) and a special invisibility hat, Harry becomes invisible and hide and seek suddenly seems a lot more fun. He also uses his new-found disguise to have fun in many other ways, but the novelty soon wears off and Harry decides that he doesn't want to be invisible forever. There is just the small matter of reversing the effects of the invisibility hat before he is stuck that way for good.
93	"It's An Elephant-Ostrich"	Sheila Dinsmore	Kevin Currie
What do you get when you cross a zebra and a rhinoceros? A zebraceros of course. Harry is having great fun mixing up his toy safari animals and inventing new creatures when Mom asks him to tidy up in time for lunch. However, Harry trips on his way to the toy box and the animals land in the Dinos' bucket. Harry and the Dinos follow them into Dino World and discover that the toy animals have now become full-size animals and they are still mixed up. After some consideration, the hybrid animals decide they quite like their new identities and when Harry wants to head home for lunch, he has some trouble persuading the animals to come with him and return to their regular safari-selves.
94	"My Hair Is Short"	Steve Westren	Jean Marc Paradis
Harry has a new hair cut, but he thinks that Mom has cut it a little too short. Harry and the Dinos go to Dino World in search of something that might make it grow back quickly... Luckily, help is at hand in the form of Gaston, a French poodle and hairdresser to the stars. He applies a tiny drop of his super-duper hair-growing potion to Harry's hair and everyone watches in amazement as Harry suddenly develops long flowing locks. Harry quickly discovers some novel ways to enjoy his new hair style and the Dinos soon want to join in the fun too. It is all going well until Steggy spills the bottle of hair tonic and Dino World suddenly becomes a very hairy scary place. There's nothing for it but to make all the hair disappear again with Gaston's special antidote potion and Harry is reminded that the best thing about hair is that it will always grow back again.
95	"School's Out"	Patrick Granleese	Jeff Bittle
When Harry comes home with exciting tales from his day at school, the Dinos wish that they could go to school too. Harry thinks that Dino World may be the place to look for a Dino school - and when they arrive they find a school ready-and-waiting for them. With Harry as their teacher, the Dinos have a great time learning how to be at school: Trike is appointed board monitor; Patsy demonstrates playing the ukulele for 'Show and Tell' and they all discover that recess is the best part of the day. For their last lesson, Harry decides to teach the Dinos how volcanoes work, but he gets a little over-generous with the baking soda as part of his demonstration ensuring that Dino school ends with a bang.
96	"Where Did the Wind Go?"	Bruce Robb	Ray Jafelice
Harry and the Dinos want to fly their kite, but with no sign of a breeze they are struggling to get it off the ground. Pasty suggests that Dino World may provide the answer, so Harry and the gang jump through the bucket and head off in search of the wind. The only trouble is, there's not a gust of wind to be found in Dino World either, and 'The Wind Finders' still can't fly their kite. When they meet Nancy the Nanosaurus, they discover that the wind isn't the only thing missing and before long, 'The Wind Finders' have become 'The Bird Finders' who in turn, become 'The Seed Finders' and 'The Rain Cloud Finders'. Harry quickly learns through this chain of events that everything in nature depends on everything else and he might just have to wait his turn before he gets to fly his kite.
97	"There's Got to Be Something!"	Bernice Vanderlaan	Daniel Payette
The Dinos are helping Harry look through his old toys for something he can give to Charley's new baby cousin. They finally settle on some building blocks as the perfect present, but discover that most of the set are missing. Determined to locate the rest, Harry and his Dino pals head off to Dino World and embark on a daring block-finding adventure. On their arrival, they encounter Digger Stan, the build-it man, who is busy with his latest road construction project, and Harry and the Dinos offer to lend a hand in return for Stan's help with their mission. En route, Harry re-discovers some of the toys he used to play with and finding the missing blocks for the new baby also proves to be a bit of a trip down memory lane.
98	"That's Strong"	Patrick Granleese	Troy Sullivan
Nana is having a clear-out and Sam is helping her carry some heavy boxes to the car to take to the school jumble sale. Harry tries to lend a hand, but to his dismay, discovers that he isn't strong enough. A trip to Dino World is called for to find the solution to Harry's predicament, and he's motivated even further when he realises that he needs to be stronger to help Nancy Nanosaurus lift Clown Mountain to retrieve something that has rolled underneath. It is not long before the Dinos are putting Harry through his paces in the Dino World gym and he is ready to try his luck on the Dino-Meter Strength Tester. With their new-found strength, Harry and the gang manage to shift Clown Mountain for Nancy before heading home to help Nana with those boxes.
99	"What's a Quest?"	Bruce Robb	Jean Marc Paradis
Harry is curious to know what a 'quest' is after he sees Sam reading a book about Jason and the Quest for the Golden Fleece. While Mom is explaining, Nana mentions that Mom's birthday is coming up and Harry and the Dinos decide to go to Dino World to embark on a quest of their own to find the perfect birthday gift. After jumping through the bucket, Harry and the gang discover an Ancient Greek rowing ship with Medea as the figurehead. By a stroke of luck, she has a whole chest full of quests for them to choose from, including one to find 'the most amazing necklace ever' - what could be better for Mom's birthday? Medea invites them all aboard and they set off on a treasure hunt to follow the clues that will lead them to their precious necklace. But with rivers and lakes to cross and a dancing giant cat to help en route, it isn't going to be easy.
100	"What Does This Key Open?"	Bruce Robb	Jeremy O'Neill
After giving Mom a necklace with a key-shaped pendant on it, Harry and his Dino pals are dying to know what the key opens and they head to Dino World on their new quest to find the matching lock. Princess Pamela's castle seems to be the perfect place to start, but the royal pets Max and Muffin have other ideas and decide to take the opportunity to make a getaway – taking the key with them. Princess Pam's naughty pets lead Harry and the gang on a wild goose chase around Dino World. But as luck would have it, Max and Muffin aren't so bad after all as they lead Harry and the Dinos to the ideal spot to try out their key: a valley full of doors. It is just a case of finding the right one and seeing where it leads...
101	"Blast Off"	Patrick Granleese	Jeff Bittle
When Harry and the Dinos learn that groups of stars make pictures called constellations, they decide to investigate further. Space Captain Harry and his Dino crew boldly go where no dino has gone before: Dino World. The intrepid adventurers set off in their spaceship and encounter a whole host of crazy cosmic characters. They soon learn that a Space Pirate has taken all the stars and it is left to Harry to persuade the pirate to let them make their own dino constellation.
102	"Space Captain Harry"	Patrick Granleese	Tom Nesbitt
Having successfully located the dino constellations, Harry and the gang have returned home safely from their space adventure only to find that they have accidentally brought a star with them... A return trip is called for, and this time they are joined by Space Cadet Charley to help escort the lost star back to the Dino-Galaxy. After some teething trouble at take-off, a few gravitational glitches, and several attempts to catch a shooting star, the space explorers finally succeed in their mission. Before they head home, they even spot Charley's very own constellation and set their sights on a brand new space adventure.
103	"Let's Go to Africa"	Bernice Vanderlaan	Karen Lloyd
Charley is taking her African drum to Show and Tell and Harry wants to take something really exciting to present as well. It is decided: Harry and the Dinos will take a balloon ride through Dino world and see what interesting specimens they can find. They embark upon the adventure of a lifetime and collect many weird and wonderful things along the way: from a didgeridoo to a statue of Ellie Phanta – the greatest dancer in the world. By the time they get home, they have a treasure trove full of souvenirs and Harry is spoilt for choice.
104	"Where's My Penguin?"	Bernice Vanderlaan	Kevin Currie
Harry has something very special to take to Show and Tell: the paper penguin that Nana made for him. But when Trike accidentally drops him into Harry's bucket, Harry and the gang embark on an epic hot-air balloon tour of Dino World in search of the missing paper penguin. Along the way, they meet Tatsu the dragon who points them in the direction of the Penguin Pole. But the paper penguin proves to be more elusive than his feathered friends and he flies out of sight just as Harry arrives...When his penguin finally turns up in a piñata at a cactus fiesta, Harry realises he's going to have the best Show and Tell story in class.

== Reception ==
Harry and His Bucket Full of Dinosaurs received positive reviews from book critics and audiences. However, the animated adaptation got mixed reception from television critics and audiences.

In the animated adaptation, KJ Dell'Antonia of Common Sense Media give a rate three stars out of five, describing "Sweet, if vapid, animated preschool fare."
