= 38 Parrots =

Film series (1976–1991)

- Written by: Grigoriy Oster
- Directed by: Ivan Ufimtsev
- Starring: Nadezhda Rumyantseva; Mikhail Kozakov; Vasily Livanov; Vsevolod Larionov
- Music by: Vladimir Shainsky; Gennady Gladkov; Aleksei Shelygin
- Country of origin: Soviet Union
- Original language: Russian

Production
- Producer: Soyuzmultfilm
- Running time: 9 min

Original release
- Release: 1976 – 1991

38 Parrots (Russian: 38 попугаев, translit. Tridtsat vosem popugaev) is a series of ten children's animated films produced in the Soviet Union between 1976 and 1991 by Soyuzmultfilm. The series portrays the amusing adventures of four friends: the talkative chimpanzee Martyshka, the shy elephant Slonyonok, the eccentric parrot Popugai, and the thoughtful boa Udav.

The title of the series comes from the very first episode, where Udav has his length measured in parrots. In most episodes the heroes solve paradoxes related to language and meaning. In one, for example, they discuss the number of nuts it takes to make a whole pile. In another, they tackle the problem of how to convey a greeting without it disappearing in transit.

The series was created by Ivan Ufimtsev and Leonid Shvartsman, and scripted by children's author Grigoriy Oster. The characters were voiced by popular actors Nadezhda Rumyantseva (Martyshka), Raisa Muhametshyna (Martyshka in "The Great Closure"), Mikhail Kozakov (Slonyonok), Vasily Livanov (Udav) and Vsevolod Larionov (Popugai). The series' music is written by Vladimir Shainsky, Gennady Gladkov and Aleksei Shelygin.

== List of episodes ==
- "38 Parrots" / 38 попугаев (12 July 1976)
- "Udav's Grandmother" / Бабушка удава (19 April 1977)
- "How to Cure Udav" / Как лечить удава (7 September 1977)
- "Where is Slonyonok Going" / Куда идёт слонёнок (18 December 1977)
- "Hello to Martyshka" / Привет мартышке (13 February 1978)
- "And What if It Works!" / А вдруг получится! (12 April 1978)
- "Gymnastics for the Tail" / Зарядка для хвоста (29 March 1979)
- "Tomorrow Will be Tomorrow" / Завтра будет завтра (5 August 1979)
- "The Great Closure" / Великое закрытие (14 January 1985)
- "Unobvious Textbook" / Ненаглядное пособие (15 July 1991)

== See also ==
- History of Russian animation
- List of stop-motion films
