= Grigoriy Oster =

Russian author and screenwriter (born 1947)

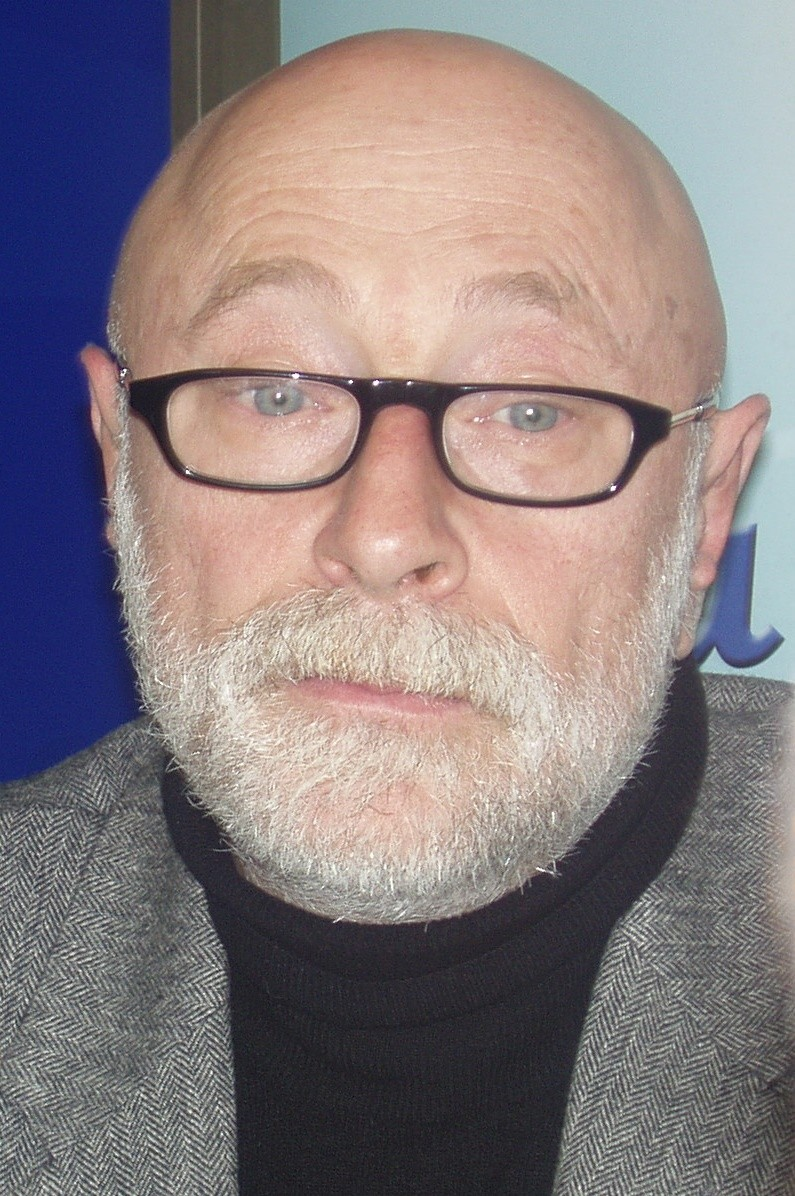
- Born: Grigoriy Bentsionovich Oster; November 27, 1947 (age 78); Odesa, Ukrainian SSR, USSR
- Writing career
- Notable works: 38 Parrots, Harmful Advice, Unconventional Mathematical Exercises, A Story with Details, An Introduction to Physics
- Grigoriy Oster's voice From the Echo of Moscow program, 21 December 2006

Grigoriy Bentsionovich Oster (born 1947) is a Russian author and screenwriter. He has written scripts for over 70 animated films, and "is considered one of the most important living Russian authors of children’s books."

== Biography ==
Oster was born in Odesa and spent his childhood in Yalta. After three years in the Soviet North Sea Navy, he studied in Moscow at the Maxim Gorky Literature Institute.

He is the author of many works for children, such as “A Tale with Details”, “Papamamalogy”, “Parenting Adults”, “Grandma Boa”, “Bad Advice”, “Fortunetelling on Hands, Legs, Ears, Back and Neck”. He wrote the scripts for the animated films “38 Parrots”, “Got That Biting!”, “A Kitten By the Name of Woof”, “Young Monkeys”, etc., of the feature film “Before the First Blood”. Four stories were featured in the Yeralash newsreel.

In the late 1990s, Mikhail Epstein and Alexander Genis included Grigory Oster in the list of “Who is who in Russian postmodernism”. In this list of 170 names, Oster is the only children's writer who “made a contribution to the development of post-totalitarian Russian literature.” At the same time, the writer never belonged to either the socialist realist, the dissident, or the avant-garde literary camp. According to the observations of critics, his aesthetics are distinguished by "stylistic eclecticism, subtext, citation, play of signs, irony, parody and stylization."

In 2004, at the suggestion of the Presidential Administration of Russia, he was one of the creators of the site “The President of Russia for Schoolchildren”.

From September 7, 2008 to July 18, 2009, along with the singer Glukoza, he conducted the program “Children's Pranks” on STS.
