= Ian Whybrow =

British author

Ian Whybrow (born 24 February 1942) is a British writer of children's books, first published in 1989. He has written over 100 books for children, has been translated into 27 languages and is published in 28 countries. His books are humorous and range from picture books to novels, short stories and poetry.

== Early life ==
Whybrow was born on 24 February 1942 in Gillingham, Kent, and grew up in Margate and Hong Kong.

== Career ==
=== Teacher ===
Whybrow began his professional career as a teacher, becoming head of English and head of sixth form at The John Lyon School in Harrow on the Hill in north-west London. Whybrow subsequently was able to give up teaching to write full-time.

=== Author ===
Whybrow's first book was The Sniff Stories in 1989, which was followed by other books about the character. He is best known for his series of books about Harry and His Bucket Full of Dinosaurs, illustrated by Adrian Reynolds. Other characters that have featured in series of books include Little Wolf, Miss Wire and Sissy Buttons, but it is Harry who has spawned the most books by far.

Harry and the Bucketful of Dinosaurs series has been adapted into a 104 episode animated television series with a slightly different name, Harry and His Bucket Full of Dinosaurs, which premiered on Cartoon Network's Tickle-U block in the United States on 22 August 2005.

Little Wolf's book of Badness has been made into an award-winning film for television in 2003, directed by Karsten Kiilerich. Most recently, it was made into a play, which ran at the Hampstead Theatre, London from December 2007 to January 2008, adapted by the director, Anthony Clark, with Llan Goodman as Little Wolf.

== Personal life ==
Whybrow and his wife Ann have two daughters. He lives in Cambridge, England.

== Awards ==
- Quacky Quack-quack! was nominated for the Smarties Prize.
- A Baby For Grace was nominated for the Carnegie Medal.
- Little Wolf's Book of Badness won the TSB Birmingham Book Award, a UKRA Award for making a substantial contribution to literacy, the Talkie Award for the Best Children's Book and Tape, a nomination for the best TV movie (for a 2003 Christmas special on Channel 4), and was a finalist for the Best Children's Programme in the Broadcast Awards and the Best TV Special in the British Animation Awards. The book has also won awards in Italy and the USA.
- Harry and His Bucket Full of Dinosaurs was shortlisted for the Children's Book Award and won both the Sheffield Children's Book Award and the Norfolk Libraries Children's Book Award.
- Whiff was nominated for the Blue Peter Award for the Best Picture Book to Read Aloud.
- Where's Tim's Ted has won prizes in France and Italy.

== Books ==
- The Sniff Stories (with Toni Goffe) (1989)
- Sniff Bounces Back (illustrated by Toni Goffe) (1990)
- Quacky Quack-quack! (illustrated by Russell Ayto) (1991)
- Sniff and the Secret of Spalderton Hall (with Toni Goffe) (1991)
- Holly and the Skyboard (with Mike Gordon) (1993)
- Nice One Sniff (illustrated by Tony Ross) (1994)
- The Time Sailors (with Anthony Lewis) (1994)
- Fix It With Bubblegum (with Tim Archbold) (1995)
- Red's Big Wish Day (with Tim Archbold) (1995)
- Can I Stand on Your Head? (with Tim Archbold) (1995)
- Little Wolf's Book of Badness (illustrated by Tony Ross) (1995)
- Miss Wire and the Three Kind Mice (with EC Clark) (1996)
- Little Wolf's Diary of Daring Deeds (illustrated by Tony Ross) (1996)
- Sing Boogie Boogie (with Tim Archbold) (1996)
- Parcel For Stanley (with Sally Hobson) (1997)
- The Bedtime Bear (with Axel Scheffler) (1997)
- Harry and the Snow King (illustrated by Adrian Reynolds) (1997)
- Little Wolf's Haunted Hall for Small Horrors (illustrated by Tony Ross) (1998)
- Goo Goo Gorilla (with Tony Blundell) (1998)
- A Baby For Grace (with Christian Birmingham) (1998)
- The Christmas Bear (illustrated by Axel Scheffler) (1998)
- Sniff the Wonderdog (illustrated by Tony Ross) (1999)
- Little Wonder (with Emily Bolam) (1999)
- Harry and the Bucketful of Dinosaurs (illustrated by Adrian Reynolds) (1999)
- Jump In (with David Melling) (1999)
- Where's Tim's Ted? (with Russell Ayto) (1999)
- Whiff (illustrated by Russell Ayto) (1999)
- Little Wolf's Postbag (illustrated by Tony Ross) (2000)
- A Footballer Called Flip (illustrated by Tony Ross) (2000)
- The Magic Sneeze (illustrated by Tony Ross) (2000)
- Young Robin's Hood (illustrated by Tony Ross) (2000)
- Little Wolf: Forest Detective (illustrated by Tony Ross) (2000)
- The Tickle Book (with Axel Scheffler) (2000)
- Boy Racer (illustrated by Tony Ross) (2000)
- Aliens Stole My Dog (illustrated by Tony Ross) (2000)
- Whizz the Fleabag (illustrated by Tony Ross) (2000)
- Harry and the Robots (illustrated by Adrian Reynolds) (2000)
- Where’s Bitesize? (with Penny Dann) (2001)
- The Houseminders (with Julie Monks) (2001)
- All Change! (with David Melling) (2001)
- Harry and the Dinosaurs Say Rahh! (illustrated by Adrian Reynolds) (2001)
- Little Farmer Joe (with Christian Birmingham) (2001)
- The Snow Friends (with Tiphanie Beeke) (2001)
- Wish, Change, Friend (with Tiphanie Beeke) (2002)
- Harry and the Dinosaurs Have a Very Busy Day (illustrated by Adrian Reynolds) (2002)
- Harry and the Dinosaurs Play Hide and Seek (illustrated by Adrian Reynolds) (2002)
- Good Night, Monster (with Ken Wilson-Max) (2002)
- Dear Little Wolf (illustrated by Tony Ross) (2002)
- Little Wolf’s Handy Book of Poems (illustrated by Tony Ross) (2002)
- Go To Bed, Doodlehead (with Jude Wisdom) (2002)
- Sissy Buttons Takes Charge (with Olivia Villet) (2002)
- Three Little Rascals (with Michael Terry) (2002)
- Harry and the Dinosaurs Romp in the Swamp (illustrated by Adrian Reynolds (2002)
- How Sissy Buttons Saved the Day (with Olivia Villet) (2002)
- Little Wolf, Pack Leader (illustrated by Tony Ross) (2002)
- Little Wolf’s Big Book of Spooks and Clues (illustrated by Tony Ross) (2002)
- I’d Rather Go To Grandad’s (with Sarah Massini) (2003)
- Wobble Bear (with Caroline Jayne Church) (2003)
- The Unvisibles (with Glen McReady) (2003)
- The Noisy Way To Bed (with Tiphanie Beeke) (2003)
- Harry and the Dinosaurs Make a Christmas Wish (illustrated by Adrian Reynolds) (2003)
- Wobble Bear Says Yellow (with Caroline Jayne Church) (2003)
- Gently Bentley (with David Melling) (2004)
- Hey, I Love You (with Rosie Reeve) (2004)
- Harry and the Dinosaurs Tell the Time (illustrated by Adrian Reynolds) (2004)
- Little Wolf, Terror of the Shivery Sea (illustrated by Tony Ross) (2004)
- Badness For Beginners (Little Wolf and Smellybreff) (illustrated by Adrian Reynolds) (2004)
- Harry and the Dinosaurs at the Museum (illustrated by Adrian Reynolds) (2004)
- Again! (with Sebastian Braun) (2004)
- Good Fun Farm (with Jonathan Allen) (2005)
- Faraway Farm (with Alex Aycliffe) (2005)
- Muckabout School (2005)
- Harry and the Dinosaurs and the Bucketful of Stories (illustrated by Adrian Reynolds) (2005)
- Babies Can (with Lara Jones) (2005)
- Harry and the Dinosaurs Go Wild (illustrated by Adrian Reynolds) (2005)
- Who's a Cheeky Baby? (with Kate Pankhurst) (2006)
- Here Comes Harry With His Buckeful of Dinosaurs (illustrated by Adrian Reynolds) (2006)
- Tim, Ted and the Pirates (illustrated by Russell Ayto) (2006)
- Robin Hood's Best Shot (illustrated by Tony Ross) (2006)
- Through the Catflap (illustrated by Tony Ross) (2006)
- Alex the Walking Accident (illustrated by Tony Ross) (2006)
- There's a Spell Up My Nose (illustrated by Tony Ross) (2006)
- Scary Hair (with Cliff Moon) (2006)
- What's the Time, Little Wolf? (illustrated by Tony Ross) (2006)
- Star Baby (with Jason Cockroft) (2006)
- The Boy Who Had (Nearly) Everything (illustrated by Tony Ross) (2006)
- The Secret Superhero (illustrated by Tony Ross) (2006)
- The Knights of the Brown Table (illustrated by Adrian Reynolds) (2006)
- Say Hello To the Animals (with Tim Warnes) (2006)
- Harry and the Dinosaurs Go to School (illustrated by Adrian Reynolds) (2006)
- Good Fun Farm (with Jonathan Allen) (2007)
- Say Hello to the Baby Animals (with Edward Eaves) (2007)
- Hello? Is That Grandma? (with Deborah Allwright) (2007)
- Welcome to Dino World (Harry and the Dinosaurs) (illustrated by Adrian Reynolds) (2007)
- Jump into Dino World (Harry and the Dinosaurs) (illustrated by Adrian Reynolds) (2007)
- Harry and the Dinosaurs Make a Splash (illustrated by Adrian Reynolds) (2007)
- Ella the Superstar (with Cliff Moon and Sam McCullen) (2007)
- Animal Soup (with Teresa Murfin) (2007)
- The Magic Shoebox Farm (with Paul Howard) (2007)
- I'm Not Scared of Monsters (Harry and the Dinosaurs) (illustrated by Adrian Reynolds) (2007)
- Harry's Dino World (2007)
- Meet My Dinosaurs (Harry and the Dinosaurs) (illustrated by Adrian Reynolds) (2007)
- Say Hello to the Snowy Animals (with Edward Eaves) (2007)
- Miss Wire's Christmas Surprise (with Emma Chichester) (2007)
- Bella Gets Her Skates On (with Rosie Reeve) (2007)
- Fun on the Farm (with Alex Aycliffe) (2008)
- Along Came a Bedtime (with Guy Parker-Rees) (2008)
- More Adventures With Harry and the Dinosaurs) (illustrated by Adrian Reynolds) (2008)
- Meerkat Madness (2011)
- More Meerkat Madness (2011)
- Even More Meerkat Madness : Flying High (2012)
