= Oleg Grigoriev =

- Oleg Grigoriev
- Born: December 6, 1943; Vologda Oblast, USSR
- Died: April 30, 1992 (aged 48); Saint-Petersburg, Russia
- Occupations: poet, artist

Oleg Yevgenievich Grigoriev (Russian: Оле́г Евге́ньевич Григо́рьев, IPA: [ɐˈlʲek jɪvˈɡʲenʲjɪvʲɪdʑ ɡrʲɪˈɡorʲjɪf]; 6 December 1943 – 30 April 1992) was a Russian poet and artist. He is regarded as a successor of the Oberiu tradition. Many of his short poems became modern folklore.

== Biography ==
Oleg Grigoriev was born during the evacuation of the Vologda region in World War II. After the war, Grigoriev's father became an alcoholic after returning from the war, with Grigoriev and his mother moving to Leningrad. At an early age, he started to paint and write poetry (he wrote one of his most famous poems, "I have asked electrician Petrov...," at the age of 16). After finishing secondary school, Grigoriev enrolled in art school, but was soon expelled for painting "in an inappropriate way". Afterwards, Grigoriev worked as a guard, a stoker, a postman, a seasonal worker, and a yard-keeper.

In 1970 he published his first book, "Oddballs" («Чудаки»), a collection of children's poetry. Soon after, he was charged with parasitism and sentenced to public works building an industrial plant.

In 1975 he took part in art exhibition in DK Nevsky.

In 1981, his second collection of children's poetry, "Growth Vitamin" («Витамин роста»), was published. Poems from the book were widely popular, but attracted criticism from the Soviet literary apparatchiks and parts of the literary establishment, including Sergey Mikhalkov. Reportedly, the main reason for the Mikhalkov's outrage was a verse where a bird says that a branch is similar to a cage, but the rods on the branch are not as close to each other, which Mikhalkov interpreted as a subliminal anti-Soviet statement. As a result, two editors of the book were fired and Grigoriev was denied membership in the USSR Union of Writers, which would have made it possible for him to write full-time. His drinking problem developed in the labor camp deepened.

Grigoriev's next children's book, "Talking Raven" («Говорящий ворон»), was published in 1987.

In 1989, he received a suspended sentence for a drunk fight with a policeman. The sentence could have been harsher, but several Russian writers, including Andrey Bitov and Bella Akhmadulina, asked court to pardon the poet. In 1991, Grigoriev was finally granted membership into the Union of Writers.

Oleg Grigoriev died on April 30, 1992, from a perforated ulcer. He was buried in Volkovo Cemetery in Saint-Petersburg.

His first book of adults' poetry was published after his death in 1993. Since then his poems, both for kids and adults, are republished several times every year and some his works have been translated into German and French.

== Bibliography ==
- Grigoriev, Oleg. Et alors? 12 petits contes sélectionnés et illustrés par Vitali Konstantinov et traduits par Marion Graf. — Genève: Editions La Joie de lire, 2010. — 32 c. — ISBN 978-2-88908-044-1
- Григорьев О. Шли вперед — пришли назад. — М.: Азбука-классика, 2010. — 224 с. — ISBN 978-5-9985-0571-3.
- Григорьев О. Птица в клетке. Стихи и проза. — СПб.: изд. Ивана Лимбаха, 2007. — 270 с. — ISBN 978-5-89059-116-6.
- Григорьев О. Чудаки и другие. Стихи. — СПб.: ДЕТГИЗ, 2006. — 127 с.
- Григорьев О. Хулиганские стихи. — СПб.: Амфора, 2005. — 96 с. — ISBN 5-94278-855-3.
- Григорьев О. Стихи для детей. — М.: Самокат, 2005. — 80 с. — ISBN 978-5-902326-38-0.
- Gigorjew, Оleg. Ich hatte viele Bonbons mit ... — Düsseldorf: Grupello Verlag, 1997. — 52 с. — ISBN 3-928234-60-9.
- Григорьев О. Птица в клетке. Стихи и проза. — СПб.: изд. Ивана Лимбаха, 1997. — 270 с. — ISBN 5-89059-009-X
- Григорьев О. Чудаки. — СПб.: Mitkilibris, 1994. Авторское повторение первой книги Олега Григорьева 1971 г. с послесловием В. Гусева и Е. Гусевой.
- Григорьев О. Вся жизнь: Стихи. СПб.: Искусство-СПб, 1994.
- Григорьев О. Стихи. Рисунки. — СПб.: Нотабене, 1993. — 239 с.
- Григорьев О. Двустишия, четверостишия и многостишия. — СПб: Камера хранения, 1993. — 124 с.
- Митьки и стихи Олега Григорьева: Альбом. — М.: ИМА-пресс, 1991.
- Григорьев О. Стихи. Буклет. — М.: Прометей, 1990.
- Григорьев О. Говорящий ворон. Стихи. — Л.: Детская литература, 1989. — 64 с.
- Григорьев О. Витамин роста. — М.: Детская литература, 1981. — 64 с.
- Григорьев О. Чудаки. — Л.: Детская литература, 1971. — 60 с.
